= In Praise of Shadows =

1933 essay by Jun'ichirō Tanizaki

- English language cover
- Author: Jun'ichirō Tanizaki
- Original title: 陰翳礼讃 (In'ei Raisan)
- Translator: Thomas Harper and Edward Seidensticker (1977); Gregory Starr (2017); Michael Cronin (2026)
- Language: Japanese
- Genre: Philosophy, aesthetics
- Publisher: Various
- Publication date: 1933; 1954 (English adaptation); 1977 (first English translation)
- Publication place: Japan
- English publication date: 1977 (Leete's Island Books); 2017 (Sopra Books); 2026 (Tuttle Publishing); (N.b. Random House has also released paperback editions of the 1977 translation under various imprints.)
- Pages: 59 (original essay)

In Praise of Shadows (陰翳礼讃, In'ei Raisan) is an essay by Jun'ichirō Tanizaki about Japanese aesthetics. Tanizaki's observations include cultural notes on customs and traditions, people, historical places and buildings, discussion of various materials and craft techniques, as well as food and even unusual recipes as seen through the author's metaphorical lens of light and shadow. The original essay was published in Japan in 1933.

The 1977 English translation includes a foreword by the architect Charles Moore, who writes that the book "helps us to look deep into ourselves to our own inhabitation of our world, as it describes with spine-tingling insights the traditional Japanese inhabitation of theirs. It could change our lives."

== Overview ==
=== Themes ===
The essay consists of 16 sections that discuss traditional Japanese aesthetics in contrast with change. Comparisons of light with darkness are used to contrast Western and Asian cultures. The West, in its striving for progress, is presented as continuously searching for light and clarity, while the subtle and subdued forms of East Asian art and literature are seen by Tanizaki to represent an appreciation of shadow and subtlety, closely relating to the traditional Japanese concept of sabi. In addition to contrasting light and dark, Tanizaki further considers the layered tones of various kinds of shadows and their power to reflect low sheen materials like gold embroidery, patina and cloudy crystals. In addition, he distinguishes between the values of gleam and shine.

The text presents personal reflections on topics as diverse as architecture and its fittings, traditional crafts, finishes, jade, food, cosmetics and mono no aware (the art of impermanence). Tanizaki explores in close description the use of space in buildings, lacquerware by candlelight, monastery toilets and women in the dark of a brothel. The essay acts as "a classic description of the collision between the shadows of traditional Japanese interiors and the dazzling light of the modern age".

The 16 section themes are translated in the 2017 English version as follows:

- On construction
- The toilet aesthetic
- A different course
- A novelist's daydreams
- On paper, tin and dirt
- Candlelight and lacquerware
- Bowls of broth
- The enigma of shadows
- An uncanny silence
- Reflections in darkness
- Shadows on the stage
- The woman of old
- Beauty in the dark
- A world of shadows
- A cool breeze in total darkness
- Final grumblings

=== Cultural notes ===
Tanizaki's observations include cultural notes on topics such as arts and crafts, paper making, lacquerware design and the Japanese room. He gives a recipe for the unusual dish of Persimmon leaf Sushi on pages 60 to 62. He also refers to many historic places and temples, as well as celebrated eateries of the day, along with customs like "moon-viewing" (tsukimi).

=== Featured individuals ===
Among the historic and contemporary individuals mentioned in the essay are:

- Natsume Sōseki, novelist, on the experience of textures and landscape via the traditional Japanese toilet, p. 9; Sōseki's Pillow of Grass, p. 26
- Saitō Ryokuu, poet quoted as saying "elegance is frigid", p. 10
- Buddha and Confucius, p. 16
- Kongō Iwao, Nō actor, p. 39.
- Baikō, aging Kabuki actor, p. 43
- Takebaya Sanehiko, president of Kaizō Publishing House (which had published Tanizaki's earlier novel Quicksand), p. 54
- Albert Einstein, p. 54

== Publication history ==
Tanizaki's aesthetic credo was already sketched out in a series of comments that appear in his 1929 novel Some Prefer Nettles, as well as in other published essays, and subsequently developed in the more polished form of In'ei Raisan in 1933. Much shorter than the author's novels, this book is a small meditative work of 73 pages, of which 59 are the essay itself.

=== English translations ===
The Atlantic published a short essay by Edward Seidensticker in its January 1955 issue (which itself was published in Japan quarterly; Vol. 1, no. 1, the previous October). Titled In Praise of Shadows: A Prose Elegy and subtitled An English Adaptation, it contains long passages of Tanizaki's original work translated with critical commentary by Seidensticker.

The first full English translation was published in 1977 by Leete's Island Books. This edition contains a foreword by the architect Charles Moore, and an afterword by Thomas J. Harper, one of the translators. Harper was Senior Lecturer in Japanese Literature at the Australian National University in Canberra, while Seidensticker, the other translator, was by then a Professor of Japanese Literature at Columbia University. Seidensticker's students also assisted with the translation. Penguin Random House has released various paperback reprints and ebook formats of this version (Jonathan Cape, Vintage Classics, Vintage, etc.).

Forty years after the publication of the initial translation, a new illustrated version was published by Sopra Books in 2017. This 102-page edition was translated by Gregory Starr and includes a foreword written by the architect Kengo Kuma, photographs by Andrew Pothecary, with an afterword by Japanese literature Professor Eve Zimmerman of Wellesley College.

A new English translation by Michael P. Cronin, an associate professor of Japanese Studies at the College of William & Mary, was published in May 2026. It is a hardbound 192-page edition by Tuttle Publishing. This volume also includes translations of three additional Tanizaki essays (Hanshin Observations, 1925; At Okamoto, 1929; and Osaka and Osakans as I See Them, 1932—which, according to Cronin, read together "form a prequel to the retranslated edition"). The book also includes photographs by John Einarsen, the editor of Kyoto Journal.

=== Other languages ===
An Italian version, Libro d'ombra ('Shadow Book'), was published by Bompiani in 1988. Éloge de l'ombre ('Eulogy to Shadows'), a French translation by René Sieffert was published by Éditions Verdier in 2011. Translations have also been published in German, Spanish, Chinese, Korean, and many other languages.

== Reception and influence ==
In addition to Moore and Kuma, many other prominent architects, designers, and artists have spoken of the book's influence on their work, including people such as Rebecca Salter, Tadao Ando, Kenya Hara, Naoto Fukasawa, Hiroshi Sugimoto, and Isamu Noguchi, as well as the British architect David Adjaye, who described it as "essential reading".

Tanizaki's influence, and especially that of In Praise of Shadows has also been widely acknowledged by writers such as Edogawa Ranpo. The work has been praised for its insight and relevance into issues of modernity and culture, and Tanizaki has been called an "ecological prophet". A. C. Grayling has described Tanizaki's essay on Japanese taste as a "hymn to nuance" and an exercise in mindfulness.

Junichiro Tanizaki selects for praise all things delicate and nuanced, everything softened by shadows and the patina of age, anything understated and natural—as for example the patterns of grain in old wood, the sound of rain dripping from eaves and leaves, or washing over the footing of a stone lantern in a garden, and refreshing the moss that grows about it – and by doing so he suggests an attitude of appreciation and mindfulness, especially mindfulness of beauty, as central to life lived well.

In the spirit of Tanizaki juxtaposing the cultures of East and West, Grayling notes a link to a similar approach and emphasis in the British writer Walter Pater whose final essay about the Renaissance he quotes, "The service of speculative culture towards the human spirit is to rouse, to startle it to a life of constant and eager observation". Grayling concludes that the difference between the two essayists lies in the "tranquility" of Tanizaki and the "intensity" of Pater.

Regarding the 2017 translation, David Mitchell, author of Cloud Atlas, wrote, "A rhapsodic meditation on a vanishing world, its aesthetics and its values. Gregory Starr's new translation is pitch perfect and transparent." Stephen Mansfield, in the Japan Times wrote, "Tanizaki, in Gregory Starr’s new and highly accomplished translation, samples a number of instances where the use and perception of light differs from the West, noting that, where Western paper reflects light, traditional Japanese paper absorbs it."

Michael Cronin's 2026 translation aims to hew more closely to the source and "capture Tanizaki’s original rhythm." It preserves Tanizaki's longer, unbroken sentence structure, including "a colossal, unbroken four-page paragraph, a torrent that sweeps the reader along irresistibly in its slipstream."

== In popular culture ==
The book also served as the primary inspiration for an album of the same name by musician Puma Blue, and an album by the jazz musicians Chicago Underground Duo.

Experimental electronic musicians Lasse Marhaug and Yuen Chee Wai released a collaborative piece titled for Tanizaki's essay in 2018. The two had recorded their respective elements of the piece independently and jointly in 2006 and 2016.
