= Arrowroot (disambiguation) =

Arrowroot is to an edible starch obtained from several tropical plants.

Arrowroot may also refer to:

== Plants ==
- Maranta arundinacea, called arrowroot, the traditional source of the starch
  - Queensland arrowroot, a cultivar of M. arundinacea belonging to the Canna Agriculture Group
- Cassava (Manihot esculenta), produces tapioca, also called Brazilian arrowroot
- Florida arrowroot, a commercial starch derived from Zamia pumila, harvested from the wild in Florida
- Achillea millefolium, commonly known as yarrow
- Colocasia esculenta, sometimes called arrowroot in East Africa
- Curcuma angustifolia, a plant with a starchy root cultivated in India
- Kudzu (Pueraria lobata), Japanese arrowroot
- Thalia geniculata, a plant species widespread across tropical Africa and much of the Americas
- Tacca leontopetaloides, known among other names as the Polynesian arrowroot

== Other uses ==
- Arrowroot (novel) (Yoshino kuzu), a 1931 novel by Jun'ichirō Tanizaki
- Arrowroot, son of Arrowshirt, a fictional character in a 1969 parody novel Bored of the Rings

== See also ==
- Arrowhead, Sagittaria species that can be used as a root vegetable
- Arrowweed, Pluchea sericea, which has edible roots
