= René Sieffert =

French japanologist and academic (1923–2004)

- Born: 4 August 1923; Achen, Moselle
- Died: 13 February 2004 (aged 80); Aurillac
- Occupation: Japanologist
- Spouse: Simone Mavielle

René Sieffert (4 August 1923 – 13 February 2004) was a French japanologist and professor at the Institut national des langues et civilisations orientales (INALCO).

René Sieffert translated many works and helped bring Japanese literature to French-speaking readers. Also, in 1971, when he was president of INALCO, he created with his wife Simone, the university press Publications orientalistes de France (POF).

== Bibliography ==
=== Works ===
Main publications:

- La Littérature japonaise
- Les Religions du Japon, ISBN 2716903220
- Treize siècles de lettres japonaises (2 vol.), ISBN 2716903255
- Le Japon et la France : images d'une découverte, ISBN 2716900116
- Théâtre classique, ISBN 2716901856

=== Translations ===
Some major translations:

- Le Dit de Hôgen (Hōgen Monogatari, Le Dit de Heiji (Heiji Monogatari), (Publications orientalistes de France, series "Le Cycle Épique des Taïra et des Minamoto".
- 1997: Le Dit des Heike (平家物語, Heike monogatari), Publications orientalistes de France, series "Le Cycle Épique des Taïra et des Minamoto" - ISBN 978-2716903080
- 1988: Le Dit du Genji (源氏物語, Genji monogatari) de dame Murasaki Shikibu - ISBN 978-2-7169-0261-8
- Les Belles Endormies (The House of the Sleeping Beauties) by Yasunari Kawabata
- 1977: Éloge de l'ombre (In Praise of Shadows) by Tanizaki Jun'ichirô, Publications orientalistes de France
- 1986: Contes d'Uji, Publications orientalistes de France, series "Les œuvres capitales de la littérature japonaise"
- 1979: Contes de Yamato (大和物語, Yamato Monogatari), followed by Dit de Heichū (Heichū Monogatari) (平中物語), Publications orientalistes de France
- 1993: De cent poètes un poème (百人一首, Hyakunin isshu), Publications orientalistes de France, series "Tama"
- 1997: Le Journal de Tosa (土佐日記, Tosa nikki), Publications orientalistes de France, series "Tama"
- 1960: La tradition secrète du nô, followed by Une journée de nô, éd. Gallimard-Unesco, series "Connaissance de l'Orient"
- 1997: Contes de pluie et de lune (Ugetsu Monogatari) by Ueda Akinari, Gallimard-Unesco, series "Connaissance de l'Orient".
