= Light Snow =

Light Snow may refer to:

- The Makioka Sisters, a 1943 novel by Jun'ichirō Tanizaki
- Xiaoxue, the 20th solar term
