= On Watanabe =

Japanese author (1902 –1930)

- 渡辺 温
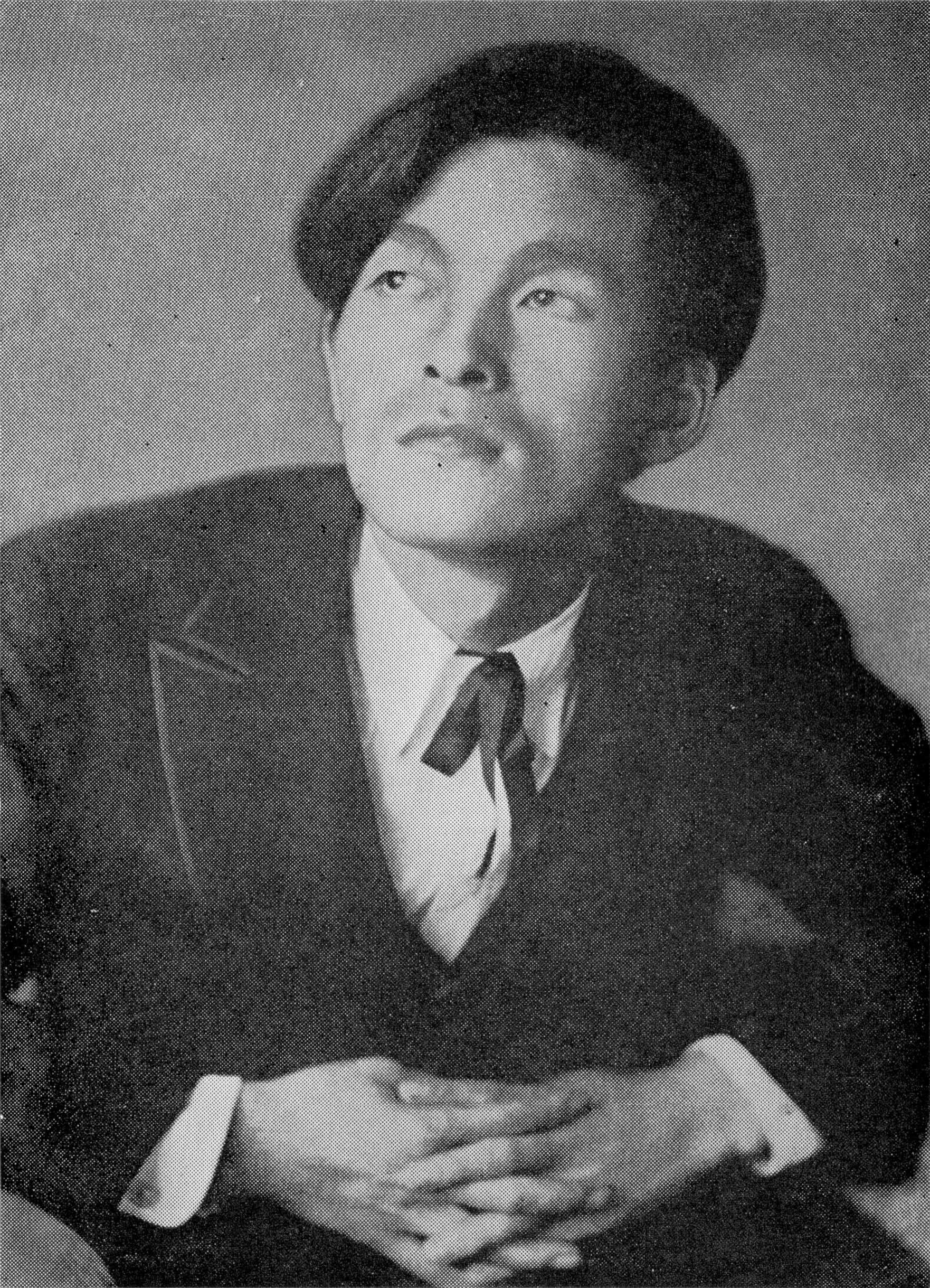
- Photo of unknown date
- Born: Yutaka Watanabe; 26 August 1902; Yakomura, Kamiiso District, Hokkaido
- Died: 10 February 1930 (aged 27); Shukugawa, Nishinomiya City
- Occupation: Writer
- Writing career
- Genre: Fiction

On Watanabe (渡辺 温, Watanabe On; 26 August 1902 – 10 February 1930) was a Japanese mystery writer and fantasy novelist. Despite his early death aged 27, he was an inspiration for later Japanese authors.

== Biography ==
Watanabe was born in Yakomura, Kamiiso District, Hokkaido (now Hokuto City). His real name was Yutaka Watanabe. He was the third son of Itaro Watanabe and Tsune Watanabe, and the younger brother of detective writer Keisuke Watanabe. In February 1905, the family moved to Fukagawa, Tokyo, and he spent his childhood in company housing in a slum area. In August 1912, he moved to Takasuzu Village, Taga District in Ibaraki Prefecture (now Hitachi City). In 1920, he graduated from Mito Junior High School and entered Keio University's Literature Preparatory Course, but dropped out in April 1921. In April 1922, he entered Keio High School. Around this time, he started living with his brother Keisuke and the writer Kōtarō Fukuda.

In 1924, he submitted "Shadows" to a competition for film drafts held by the Plato Publishing magazines Josei and Kuraku and won the first prize. The judges on this occasion were Jun'ichirō Tanizaki and Kaoru Osanai. (Note: According to Tanizaki, Osanai was reluctant to vote for Watanabe because it would be difficult to adapt Shadows to a film due to its content, but Tanizaki, who highly praised Shadows as a work, pushed strongly and it was selected for the first prize.) Around this time, he became acquainted with Michiko Oikawa, an actress at the Tsukiji Shōgekijō (Tsukiji Little Theatre), and started a romantic relationship, but because Oikawa was sickly the people around him opposed marriage and he gave up on it.

In March 1926, he graduated from Keio University. In January 1927 he was recruited by Masashi Yokomizo, who had been appointed as the second editor-in-chief of Shin Seinen (“New Youth”) magazine, and joined publisher Hakubunkan as an editorial assistant. He is said to have worn morning dress and a top hat when going to Hakubunkan’s offices, at that time a clear exhibition of his commitment to modernism.

In July 1928, he left Hakubunkan to concentrate on his own creative activities. In April 1929, together with Keisuke, he translated work by Edogawa Ranpo for the publication of The Poe, Hoffmann Collection (part of The Kozeisha Complete Works of World Popular Literature, Volume 30; both of them were in charge of Edgar Allan Poe). In addition, he recommended that Keisuke write a detective novel as potential material for the silent film star Tokihiko Okada, and this resulted in Keisuke's maiden work, Madonna with False Eyes (Shin Seinen, June issue). In November, he returned to work at the Shin Seinen editorial department.

On 9 February 1930, with translator Shigeji Narahara (Shūji Hasegawa), he visited Jun'ichirō Tanizaki, who was living in Okamoto near Kobe (now Higashinada Ward, Kobe City), to persuade him to write an essay for Shin Seinen. (Note: According to Tanizaki, he was unable to write the essay requested by Watanabe for Shin Seinen and on 7 February he sent a telegram saying ”hard to write”. Watanabe still asked for the manuscript, and he visited the Tanizaki residence in person on the afternoon of the 9th with Narahara, who was lodging in Shukugawa, Nishinomiya City. Tanizaki promised to write and deliver the manuscript by the evening of the 10th, the next day, so Watanabe decided to stay at Narahara's boarding house and left.) That night (around 1:50 a.m. on the following day, the 10th), a freight train collided with his taxi at a railroad crossing in Shukugawa. He was taken to Nishinomiya Regeneration Hospital, but died of cerebral contusion. Narahara, who was in the taxi with him, was also injured but survived.

Tanizaki published his eulogy for Watanabe entitled Shunkan in the April 1930 issue of Shin Seinen. The incident was the motivation for Tanizaki to write The Secret History of the Lord of Musashi, and it was serialized in the same magazine from 1931 onwards.

== Major works ==
- 影 (Shadows), published simultaneously in the January 1925 issues of both Kuraku and Josei magazines. First published under the name "Yu Watanabe". Debut publication.
- 少女 (Girl), "Mita Bungeijin" July 1925 issue. First published under the name " Yutaka Watanabe". Reprinted in Shin Seinen March 1929 issue
- 象牙の牌 (Ivory Tiles), May 1926.
- 兵隊の死 (Death of a Soldier), reprinted in January 1927 issue of Detective Hobby, and April 1930 issue of Shin Seinen (Note: Because it was published in the On Watanabe eulogy feature in Shin Seinen, Death of a Soldier is sometimes regarded mistakenly as a posthumous work, whereas it is actually an early work.)
- 嘘 (Lie), Shin Seinen March 1927 issue
- 氷れる花嫁 (The Ice Bride), Shin Seinen April 1927 issue
- 父を失ふ話 (The Story of Losing My Father), Detective Hobby July 1927 issue
- 可哀相な姉 (The Poor Sister), Shin Seinen October 1927 issue
- シルクハット (Silk Hat), Detective Hobby April 1928 issue
- ああ華族様だよと私は嘘を吐（つ） (I Lied That I Was a Nobleman), Kodan Zasshi April 1929 issue
- アンドロギュノスの裔 (Descendants of Androgynous), Shin Seinen August 1929 issue

For more, see Descendants of Androgynous: The Complete Works of On Watanabe.

Watanabe’s works await translation into English.

== Bibliography ==
- Watanabe, On (1970). アンドロギュノスの裔 (Descendants of Androgynous) (in Japanese). Rosicrucian.
- Hamada, Yūsuke; Taniguchi, Motoi; Watanabe, Atsushi (1992). 渡辺温 嘘吐きの彗星 (On Watanabe - Liar Comet). Shin Seinen series (in Japanese). Hakubunkan Shinsha. ISBN 978-4-89177-941-2.
- Watanabe, On (August 2011). アンドロギュノスの裔 渡辺温全集 (Descendants of Androgynous: The Complete Works of On Watanabe). Sogen Reasoning Library (in Japanese). Tokyo Sogensha. ISBN 978-4-488-40711-7.
- Tanizaki, Jun’ichirō (10 February 2016), 谷崎潤一郎全集 (Tanizaki Jun'ichirō zenshū (The Complete Works of Jun’ichirō Tanizaki)) (in Japanese), vol. 15, Chuokoron Shinsha, ISBN 978-4-12-403575-9
- Poe, Edgar Allan (September 2019). ポー傑作集 (The Edgar Allan Poe Masterpiece Collection) (in Japanese). Translated by Watanabe, On; Watanabe, Keisuke. Chuokoron-Shinsha. ISBN 978-4-12-206784-4. (Note: The Edgar Allan Poe Masterpiece Collection is a paperback collection of parts related to Poe extracted from The Kozeisha Complete Works of World Popular Literature, Volume 30, including an excerpt from Edogawa Ranpo's Thirty Years of the Detective Story, Jun’ichirō Tanizaki's Shunkan, Watanabe Higashi's newly written On to Keisuke and Karasu, and a commentary by Yusuke Hamada. According to Hamada's commentary, The Poe, Hoffmann Collection was published as a translation of Edogawa Ranpo, but the actual translation of the Poe part was co-translated by the Watanabe brothers. Also, according to the same commentary, On Watanabe was responsible for The Gold-Bug, The Murders in the Rue Morgue, The Mystery of Marie Rogêt, MS. Found in a Bottle, The Oblong Box, The Masque of the Red Death, The Tell-Tale Heart, William Wilson, and Keisuke for the remaining seven (The Purloined Letter, A Descent into the Maelström, The Premature Burial, The Pit and the Pendulum, The Black Cat, Hop-Frog). Keisuke recorded that he was also responsible for The Fall of the House of Usher. Although The Poe, Hoffmann Collection became a bestseller, it was later deleted from Watanabe’s complete works.)

== See also ==
- Japanese literature
- List of Japanese writers
