= Diary of a Mad Old Man (1987 film) =

1987 film

- Directed by: Lili Rademakers
- Written by: Claudine Bouvier, Hugo Claus
- Produced by: Fons Rademakers, Henry Lange, Pierre Drouot
- Cinematography: Paul Van Den Bos
- Edited by: Toon De Graaff
- Music by: Egisto Macchi
- Distributed by: Cannon Tuschinski Film Distribution (Netherlands, 1988)
- Release date: 1987
- Running time: 90 minutes
- Country: Netherlands
- Language: Dutch

Diary of a Mad Old Man (Dutch: Dagboek van een Oude Dwaas) is a 1987 Dutch film directed by Lili Rademakers. It is based on the 1961 Japanese novel Diary of a Mad Old Man by Jun'ichirō Tanizaki.

The film was selected for the Semaine de la Critique from the Cannes film festival in 1987.

== Plot ==
Hamelinck, an already old man, has a severe muscle disease and must stop working. It bothers him not long, because he gets under the spell of his daughter-in-law Simone. He admired her for years already, but now overwhelms her with gifts and treats her like a queen. He acts also submissive and is delighted as he can touch her leg. Just before he dies, Hamelinck makes the wish to get Simone's footprints on his memorial stone.

== Cast ==
- Ralph Michael ... Marcel Hamelinck
- Beatie Edney ... Simone
- Suzanne Flon ... Denise Hamelinck
- Derek de Lint ... Philippe
- Dora van der Groen ... Zuster Alma
- Ina van der Molen ... Karin
- Stef Baeyens
- Camilia Blereau
- Sjarel Branckaerts
- Carry Goossens
- Daan Hugaert
