= Manji (film) =

1964 Japanese film

- Japanese DVD cover of 1964 release
- Japanese: 卍
- Directed by: Yasuzo Masumura
- Written by: Kaneto Shindō
- Based on: Quicksand by Jun'ichirō Tanizaki
- Produced by: Saito Yonejiro
- Starring: Ayako Wakao; Kyōko Kishida; Eiji Funakoshi; Yūsuke Kawazu
- Cinematography: Kobayashi Setuo
- Edited by: Tatsuji Nakasizu (中静達治)
- Music by: Tadashi Yamauchi
- Production company: Daiei Film
- Release date: 25 July 1964
- Running time: 91 minutes
- Country: Japan
- Language: Japanese

Manji (Japanese: 卍, Manji), titled Swastika in English, is a 1964 Japanese drama film directed by Yasuzo Masumura, starring Ayako Wakao and Kyōko Kishida. The screenplay written by Kaneto Shindō is based on the 1928 novel Quicksand by Jun'ichirō Tanizaki. The theme of sexual excess includes homosexuality between women.

The 1964 release of Manji is the first film adaptation of the novel. It was followed by four additional film versions, in 1983, 1998, 2006, and 2023.

== Synopsis ==
Sonoko, a bored married woman, falls for a fellow art student, the young and beautiful Mitsuko. The relationship develops and starts to affect and involve their partners.

== Cast ==
- Ayako Wakao as Mitsuko Tokumitsu
- Kyōko Kishida as Sonoko Kakiuchi
- Eiji Funakoshi as Kotaro Kakiuchi
- Yūsuke Kawazu as Eijirō Watanuki

== See also ==
- Historical use of manji (卍) in Japan
- The Berlin Affair – 1985 film based on Quicksand by Jun'ichirō Tanizaki
- List of feature films with lesbian characters
