= Mr. Bluemound =

1926 short story by Jun'ichirō Tanizaki

"Mr. Bluemound" (Aozuka-shi no Hanashi) is a short story by the Japanese author Jun'ichirō Tanizaki, first published in 1926. The English translation appears in the volume The Gourmet Club: A Sextet (2001), translated by Paul McCarthy and Anthony Chambers, which brings together six of Tanizaki's shorter works originally published between 1911 and 1955. The story concerns an encounter between the husband of a filmstar and an obsessive fan of that star, who has a collection of disturbingly intimate replica dolls of the star.

== Plot ==
Yurako is an actress whose husband, Nakada, now dead, was a film director. After Nakada's death, she finds in his will a description of the events that Nakada believed to be the direct cause of his eventual death.

Long ago, Nakada was dining at a restaurant when he met a middle-aged man who had seen all the films that Yurako had been in. The man boasted that he had a thorough knowledge of Yurako's body and claimed that Yurako belonged not only to Nakada, but also to him. The man even claimed that he had his own "Yurako" in his house and invited Nakada over to see her. Although disturbed by the story, Nakada gave in to his curiosity and accepted the invitation. At the man's house, Nakada saw a large number of dolls, all copies of Yurako. The fan had purchased pieces of her films in order to reproduce her body parts to create these dolls.
