= The Makioka Sisters (film) =

1983 Japanese family drama film by Kon Ichikawa

- Theatrical poster
- Directed by: Kon Ichikawa
- Written by: Shinya Hidaka; Kon Ichikawa; Junichiro Tanizaki
- Based on: The Makioka Sisters by Jun'ichirō Tanizaki
- Produced by: Kon Ichikawa
- Starring: Yoshiko Sakuma; Sayuri Yoshinaga; Yuko Kotegawa; Juzo Itami; Takenori Emoto; Toshiyuki Hosokawa; Koji Ishizaka; Keiko Kishi
- Cinematography: Kiyoshi Hasegawa
- Edited by: Chizuko Osada
- Music by: Shinnosuke Okawa; Toshiyuki Watanabe
- Production company: Toho
- Distributed by: Toho
- Release dates: 1983 (Japan); February 15, 1985 (New York City)
- Running time: 140 minutes
- Country: Japan
- Language: Japanese

The Makioka Sisters (Japanese: 細雪, Hepburn: Sasame-yuki; lit. Light Snowfall) is a 1983 Japanese drama film directed by Kon Ichikawa, based on the 1957 serial novel of the same name by Jun'ichirō Tanizaki. It depicts the pre-war life of the wealthy Makioka family from Osaka with parallels to the seasons in Japan.

== Plot ==
The story takes place in Japan primarily during the late 1930s (Shōwa period). The sisters live in the Kansai area (Kobe/Osaka) and travel to Tokyo and other prefectures throughout the novel.

In the spring of 1938, the four sisters, along with Teinosuke, Sachiko's husband, came to Kyoto to admire the cherry blossoms. Sachiko is unhappy that the elder sister Tsuruko, who is the heiress of the Makioka clan and therefore represents the main house of the clan, upset the matter with Yukiko's marriage for the reason that a fatal flaw was discovered in the groom's clan.

Five years ago, Taeko, the youngest of the Makioka sisters ran away from home with Keizaburo Okuhata, the third son of the owner of the Okuhata jewelry store located in Semba, Osaka's mall. One newspaper found out about this, but it mistakenly wrote the name of Yukiko instead of Taeko. Tatsuo, Tsuruko's husband, who together with her represents the main house of the Makioka clan, demanded a retraction, but the newspaper only corrected its mistake, instead of Yukiko's name, writing the name Taeko, which only aggravated the seriousness of the situation. Dissatisfied with Tatsuo's handling of affairs, Yukiko and Taeko refuse to live in the main house and move to the Sachiko house, which is a lateral branch of the Makioka clan.

Taeko starts making dolls. Her interest in Okuhata gradually fades and she grows closer to Itakura, who was previously an apprentice at Okuhata's jewelry store, but now became a photographer. At this time, Yukiko's bridegrooms are arranged with a bank broker, an employee of the prefectural council and the vice president of a pharmaceutical company, but they do not end in marriage, since Yukiko does not like the suitors. Itakura contracts an ear infection that leads to his sudden demise. And then Tatsuo comes home with the news that he is being transferred to Tokyo for work. Tsuruko is lost.

Yukiko is again offered a husband. This time the groom is a representative of the former aristocracy, the grandson of Viscount Higashidani. After Itakura's death, Taeko began going to bars, trying to drown her grief. In one bar, she meets the bartender Miyoshi, leaves the house and moves in with him. Miyoshi turns out to be an honest and serious young man, and Taeko starts a new life with him, which reassures the sisters worried about her fate. Tsuruko, after much hesitation, finally decides to leave for Tokyo with her husband. Yukiko is also doing well with Mr. Higashidani, they decide to get married.

On a winter's day at Osaka Station, Yukiko, Teinosuke and the others say goodbye to Tsuruko and her family who are leaving for Tokyo. Sachiko, however, decides not to see her off, thinking the pair would cry and embarrass themselves. Instead, she visits Taeko at her new home, and the two share tea and watch the falling snow.

== Cast ==
- Keiko Kishi (Special appearance) - Tsuruko Makioka: The eldest Makioka sister is described as being phlegmatic, and most of her voice throughout the novel is heard through letters she sends to her sisters. Tsuruko lives in the "main" Makioka house in Osaka, and is not only removed physically from her sisters, who live in a branch house in Ashiya, but also seems to be removed emotionally.
- Yoshiko Sakuma - Sachiko Makioka: The second eldest Makioka sister who is the mistress of the branch house in Ashiya. Sachiko is good-tempered and indulgent of her younger sisters, who live with her instead of, as tradition would have it, with Tsuruko.
- Sayuri Yoshinaga - Yukiko Makioka: Melancholy Yukiko is still unmarried at 30, because, when the Makioka family was in its heyday, all of her marriage proposals were turned down as not being good enough. Now, with the family in decline, marriage opportunities are much more scarce, and Yukiko's stoicity and shyness do nothing to incite her suitors' attentions. So shy that she cannot even speak on the telephone, Yukiko is sometimes frustrating, but ultimately loved by her sisters.
- Yuko Kotegawa - Taeko Makioka: The youngest Makioka sister embraces both Western clothing style and Western attitudes toward the world more than any of her sisters. Taeko smokes, has affairs and willfully defies the orders of the main Osaka house. This is mostly because she is impatient waiting for Yukiko to marry, which she must do before Taeko is allowed. Taeko is called "Koi san" endearingly, by her two older sisters in Ashiya. Calling the youngest sister "Koi san" is something commonly practiced in Osaka.
- Juzo Itami - Tatsuo Makioka: Tsuruko's husband, who took the Makioka name when he married her, and is now the master of the Makiokas. The three Ashiya sisters find Tatsuo abrasive, and somewhat dull. Tatsuo is employed at a bank.
- Koji Ishizaka - Teinosuke Makioka: Sachiko's husband who also took on the Makioka name. Teinosuke is kind, respectful of the sisters and brilliantly smart, especially when it comes to literary arts, such as poetry and letter-writing. Teinosuke is an accountant.
- Kobeicho Katsura - Okubata: Also called "Kei-boy" by the Ashiya sisters, is one of Taeko's suitors with whom she tried, and failed, to elope ten years before the story's beginning.
- Itokku Kishibe - Itakura: A photographer friend of Taeko's, a stranger to the Makioka family, to whom Taeko is attracted.
- Mika Wakabayashi - Etsuko: Sachiko's school-aged daughter, who is especially fond of Yukiko.
- Yukari Uehara - Oharu: A maid at the Ashiya house. Sachiko took Oharu under her wing and tries to teach the gossipy maid manners and decorum.
- Michiyo Yokoyama - Mrs. Itani: The owner of a beauty salon that the three younger sisters frequent. Mrs. Itani's gossip and love of matchmaking often help the sisters find prospects for a husband for Yukiko.

== Release ==
=== Home media ===
The film was released on DVD and Blu-ray by the Criterion Collection on June 14, 2011 for the first time in the United States. The disc only contains a theatrical trailer as a special feature, along with the standard Criterion booklet.

== Reception ==
In February 1985, Vincent Canby called it a "a lovely though not always easy to follow adaptation" of the novel and said "I can't be sure that the English subtitles catch what I assume to be the satiric edge to the dialogue in what is a rather sad comedy of manners. What is clear, though, is Mr. Ichikawa's cinematic equivalent of a literary style, in which characters are sometimes isolated in extended close-ups that have the effect—if not the substance—of internal monologues or of author's comments. The Makioka Sisters, though always beautiful to look at, is more stately than emotionally or intellectually involving."

For The New Yorker, Pauline Kael wrote: "A friend of mine says that when you go to a Kon Ichikawa film "'you laugh at things, and you know that Ichikawa is sophisticated enough to make you laugh, but you don't know why you're laughing'— I agree." She goes on to say Ichikawa is "making a movie that we understand musically, and he's doing it without turning the actors into zombies, and without losing his sense of how corruption and beauty and humor are all rolled up together."

The film has received overwhelmingly positive reviews, in so far as it has been reviewed at all, earning a rare 100% percent on Rotten Tomatoes, from a pool of reviews with but three "top" reviewers.
