= The Moon in the Water =

1979 non-fiction book by Gwen Boardman Petersen

The Moon in the Water: Understanding Tanizaki, Kawabata, and Mishima
- Author: Gwenn Boardman Petersen
- Language: English
- Genre: Non-fiction
- Publisher: University of Hawaii Press
- Publication date: 1979
- Publication place: United States

The Moon in the Water: Understanding Tanizaki, Kawabata, and Mishima is a 1979 non-fiction book by Gwenn Boardman Petersen, published by University of Hawaii Press. It discusses translated works by Junichiro Tanizaki, Yasunari Kawabata, and Yukio Mishima. (Note: The work itself refers to the writers' names in Japanese order, as Tanizaki Jun'ichirō, Kawabata Yasunari, and Mishima Yukio.)

The work was intended for readers in Western countries who had not studied Japan academically to the degree they were in Japanese studies. It was not to discuss any critical theories.

Thomas Cogan of Honolulu, Hawaii referred to the work as "a perceptive and critical guide to" these translations.

== Contents ==
The initial chapter, which discusses Japanese literature in general, is called "contexts". Each subsequent chapter is about each of the three writers, so there are four chapters in total.

The author compares and contrasts Japanese works to Western ones. The chapters discuss imagery and symbolism.

Kinya Tsuruta of the University of British Columbia wrote that Peterson wishes to highlight intricacies in Japanese and "fiercely attacks translators' transgressions—real or imagined." According to Tsuruta, Petersen "goes out of her way to hunt for 'hidden Japanese clues' and, of course, finds them."

== Reception ==
Cogan "highly recommended" the book, and argued that the book was "well researched and crisply written" as well as "useful and stimulating", with special praise for the portion about Suigetsu, a work by Kawabata.

Chieko Irie Mulhern of the University of Illinois stated that the book may be useful for the general public while it may cause controversies among people specializing in Japan.

Robert Rolf of the Fukuoka University of Education praised the "stimulating" reasoning in the book, and stated they would be the case even for people who disagree with Peterson's reasoning.

Tsuruta criticized the author for having a "less than ideal" understanding of the culture of Japan and the Japanese language.
