= Diary of a Mad Old Man =

Novel by Jun'ichirō Tanizaki

- First English version, 1965
- Author: Jun'ichirō Tanizaki
- Original title: Fūten rōjin nikki (瘋癲老人日記)
- Translator: Howard Hibbett
- Publisher: Chūōkōron-sha
- Publication date: 1961
- English publication date: 1965

Diary of a Mad Old Man (Japanese: 瘋癲老人日記, Hepburn: Fūten rōjin nikki) is a 1961 novel by Japanese author Jun'ichirō Tanizaki (1886–1965). Written and published shortly before the author’s death in 1965, it is recognized as an important late work.

== Plot ==
Utsugi Tokosuke is a 77-year-old invalid, recovering from a stroke that has paralyzed his hand. He lives in Tokyo with his wife (unnamed), son Jokichi and daughter-in-law Satsuko, in a large house in surroundings of wealth and comfort. His married daughters Kugako and Itsuko, and their young children, visit him occasionally, though he is cold toward them. As the book progresses, it becomes clear that Tokosuke is erotically obsessed with his daughter-in-law Satsuko, although he is impotent. In return for various expensive gifts, Satsuko permits him to kiss parts of her body, particularly her lower legs. The book culminates as Tokosuke plans to have Satsuko’s footprints carved in stone upon his tomb when he dies. The book contains numerous descriptions of medical procedures and treatments, and ends in a series of short accounts given by his private nurse, doctor and daughter Itsuko. Tokosuke is still alive at the end of the book, and it is unclear whether his funerary plans have been carried out.

== Themes ==
=== Foot fetishism ===
An interest in depicting foot fetishism emerged early in Tanizaki’s work, for example in the short story ‘Fumiko’s Feet’ (1919), which, like Diary of a Mad Old Man, features an aging (60-year-old) man in thrall to the lower extremities of a 16-year-old girl. Tokosuke in Diary of a Mad Old Man, in describing his ideal of feminine beauty, says: ‘Above all, it’s essential for her to have white, slender legs and delicate feet.’ The treatment in Diary of a Mad Old Man shades strongly into sado-masochism, as in this passage toward the end of the book: ‘At the very thought of those Buddha’s footprints modelled after her own feet she would hear my bones wailing under the stone. Between sobs I would scream: "It hurts! It hurts!...Even though it hurts, I'm happy – I've never been more happy, I'm much, much happier than when I was alive!...Trample harder! Harder!”’

=== Modernization of Japanese women ===
In the period after the First World War a new type of modern young woman, the modan garu or mogaru, became widespread in urban Japan. The mogaru was Westernized and independent, perhaps with a job outside the family home, much in contrast to the traditionally compliant and home-bound Japanese woman. Satsuko in Diary of a Mad Old Man, who has worked as a dancing girl, is a late representative of this type, and presented much in contrast with her more traditional sisters-in-law Kugako and Itsuko. Tanizaki had doubts about the encroachment of Western culture and commercialization, and expressed it particularly in his contrast in the book between the capital Tokyo (which he describes as ‘an overturned rubbish heap’) and the more placid and traditional Kyoto, where he wishes to be buried. In fact, Tanizaki was buried in the Hōnen-in temple in Kyoto which is finally picked out by the book’s diarist, Tokosuke.

=== Vicarious sexuality ===
Tokosuke, due to his impotence, derives sexual pleasure from the idea of Satsuko having an affair with Haruhisa, Tokosuke’s nephew. It is implied that Satsuko is allowed this sexual freedom by her husband Jokichi, who may be pursuing affairs himself. This strikes a marked autobiographical note: Tanizaki allowed his wife Chiyo to carry on at least one affair, with the writer Haruo Satō. This situation appears in more than one other work by Tanizaki, for example the novels Kami to hito no aida (Between Men and the Gods, 1924) and Kagi (The Key, 1956), in which an old professor is complicit in his wife’s adultery as a stimulant to his own sexual desire.

== Publication ==
1961 original Japanese publication.

1965, tr. Howard Hibbet, Alfred Knopf, New York.

1966, tr. Howard Hibbet, Secker and Warburg, London.

== Film adaptations ==
- 1962: Diary of a Mad Old Man, directed by Keigo Kimura
- 1987: Diary of a Mad Old Man, directed by Lili Rademakers
- 2026: Diary of a Mad Old Man, directed by Wayne Wang
