= With Beauty and Sorrow =

- Original Japanese poster

Japanese name
- Kanji: 美しさと哀しみと
Transcriptions
- Revised Hepburn: Utsukushisa to kanashimi to
- Directed by: Masahiro Shinoda
- Written by: Nobuo Yamada (screenplay); Yasunari Kawabata (novel)
- Produced by: Takeshi Sasaki
- Starring: Kaoru Yachigusa; Mariko Kaga; Sō Yamamura
- Cinematography: Masao Kosugi
- Edited by: Yoshi Sugihara
- Music by: Tōru Takemitsu
- Production company: Shochiku
- Distributed by: Shochiku
- Release date: 28 February 1965 (Japan)
- Running time: 103 minutes
- Country: Japan
- Language: Japanese

With Beauty and Sorrow (Japanese: 美しさと哀しみと, Hepburn: Utsukushisa to kanashimi to; lit. Beauty and Sorrow) is a 1965 Japanese drama film directed by Masahiro Shinoda. It is based on the novel Beauty and Sadness (1961–63) by Nobel Prize winning writer Yasunari Kawabata.

== Plot ==
Ageing writer Ōki travels to Kyoto to meet with former lover Otoko. Fifteen years ago, the married Ōki and the then still teenage Otoko had had an affair. Otoko became pregnant by him, attempted suicide after a miscarriage, and spent several months in a mental institution, while her mother tried to persuade Ōki to marry Otoko, but to no avail. Ōki later used the affair in a novel, typed up by his grieving wife Fumiko, who had learned of his infidelity by Otoko's mother. The novel, called "The Bitter Seventeen", turned out to be a bestseller.

Otoko, now a painter and art teacher, lives with a young woman, Keiko, who is both her pupil and life partner. Keiko, jealous that Otoko has never completely stopped loving Ōki, and obsessed with the idea to avenge her lover's suffering, spends the night with Ōki and later makes an appointment with his son Taichiro, intent on destroying the writer's family. While Otoko scolds Keiko for what she sees as mere egoism, Fumiko tells her husband that she suspects that the young woman is up to something.

After Taichiro and Keiko have spent the afternoon in a hotel, they go on a boating trip together. Later, Otoko is called up to come to the hotel, as Keiko has barely survived a boating accident, while Taichiro is still missing. Otoko, Ōki and his wife meet at the unconscious Keiko's bed, where Fumiko blames Otoko that she used Keiko to kill their son. After Ōki has taken the desperate Fumiko out of the room, Keiko opens her eyes, tears running down her cheeks.

== Cast ==
- Kaoru Yachigusa as Otoko Ueno
- Mariko Kaga as Keiko Sakami
- Sō Yamamura as Toshio Ōki
- Haruko Sugimura as Otoko's mother
- Kei Yamamoto as Taichiro Ōki
- Misako Watanabe as Fumiko Ōki

== Awards ==
- 1965: Asia-Pacific Film Festival Awards – Best Supporting Actress Kaoru Yachigusa
