= Arrowroot (novel) =

1931 novella by Jun'ichirō Tanizaki

- Author: Jun'ichirō Tanizaki
- Illustrator: Lithographic illustrations by Kentaro Senoo; Original drawings by Tomomaro Higuchi
- Language: Japanese
- Genre: Novella
- Publisher: Serialized in magazine Chūō Kōron January–February 1931. Included in a volume with "A Blind Man’s Tale" and two folk tales, Chuokoronsha, February 1932. Book published by Sogensha, December 1937.
- Publication place: Japan
- English publication date: 1983, Alfred A. Knopf

Arrowroot (吉野葛, Yoshino Kuzu; "Yoshino Arrowroot") is a novella written by Jun'ichirō Tanizaki. It consists of six chapters: The Heavenly King; Iimoseyama; The Drum Hatsune; The Cry of the Fox; Kuzu; Shionoha. The narrator, who had been planning a to write a historical novel about the Nanboku-chō (Northern and Southern Courts) period, is drawn instead to the personal story of a mother's love which is revealed by his friend Tsumura who guides him in Yoshino in autumn.

In 1931, it was serialized in the January and February issues of the magazine Chūō Kōron. The first publication in book form was in the collection A Blind Man’s Tale published by Chuokoronsha in February 1932. It was published as a book in December 1937 by Sogensha as one volume of the six-part collection Jun'ichirō Rokubushu.

== Background ==
Arrowroot was one of several of Tanizaki’s works in “essay-fiction” between 1930 and 1950, combining experimentation and tradition, including Mōmoku Monogatari (A Blind Man's Tale, 1931), Bushukō hiwa (The Secret History of the Lord of Musashi, 1932), Ashikari (The Reed Cutter, 1932), Shunkinsho (A Portrait of Shunkin, 1933), and Shōshō Shigemoto no haha (Captain Shigemoto's Mother, 1949–1950).

The narrative technique of Arrowroot may have been inspired by Stendhal’s The Abbess of Castro, which Tanizaki translated into Japanese in 1928. In both works, the narrator of the story travels to a remote part of the country to investigate the truth of a story which has been concealed by historians. The narrator of Arrowroot is not Tanizaki himself.

In 1948 Tanizaki wrote that Arrowroot was one of his favorite works.

At the time of writing, Tanizaki was living in Kobe, Keihanshin and was studying the Kuzunoha sekkyō-bushi Buddhist "sermon ballad" poems and visited Yoshino frequently, writing a work Kuzunoha set in Yoshino. He conceived Arrowroot around the character Tsumura, who is modeled after Kentaro Senoo, who loves his mother. Tanizaki stayed at the ryokan Sakura Kadan on Mount Yoshino, travelled to Okuyoshino by car, conducted research, and wrote Arrowroot.

The fictional work is written in the style of an essay and, modeled on the novelist Kyokutei Bakin's Kaimaki Kyoukikyakuden, he had wanted to write the story of the historical Southern Court. His writing progressed haphazardly and when first published it was a failure, or it was regarded as just an essay, although the novelist and literary critic Takitarō Minakami gave it a high evaluation.

After World War II it came to be regarded as one of Tanizaki's masterpieces, and as a metafictional work depicting the circumstances of “I tried to write a historical novel but failed.” Since the 1980s authors Kenji Nakagami, Naomi Watabe, Joji Hirayama, literary criticYōichi Komori and others have regarded it highly. In the 1970s, the author Akio Goto wrote Yoshino-dayu (吉野大夫, The Courtesan Yoshino) as a homage to Arrowroot, for which he won the 1981 Tanizaki Prize.

== Related items ==
- Ashiya Doman
- Orikuchiism
- Yoshino
