= Diary of a Mad Old Man (2026 film) =

2026 drama film by Wayne Wang

- International promotional poster
- Directed by: Wayne Wang
- Screenplay by: Kelvin Wyles
- Based on: Diary of a Mad Old Man by Jun'ichirō Tanizaki
- Produced by: Shozo Ichiyama; Francey Grace; Andrei Epifanov; Eleonora Granata-Jenkinson
- Starring: Lily Franky; Fan Bingbing; Youki Kudoh
- Cinematography: Koichi Furuya
- Edited by: Ashley Pagàn; Masahide Koura
- Music by: Arthur Sharpe
- Production companies: Fourier Films Inc.; Cinetrain; Melograno Films
- Release date: September 18, 2026 (TIFF)
- Running time: 119 minutes
- Countries: Japan; United States
- Languages: Japanese; Mandarin

Diary of a Mad Old Man (Japanese: 瘋癲老人日記, Hepburn: Fūten rōjin nikki) is a 2026 drama film directed by Wayne Wang. Written by Kelvin Wyles, it is based on the 1961 book of the same name by the Japanese writer Jun'ichirō Tanizaki. Starring Lily Franky, and Fan Bingbing, it follows an aging widower having an intimate relationship with his caregiver daughter-in-law.

The film had its world premiere in Gala Presentations at the 2026 Toronto International Film Festival on September 18, 2026.

== Synopsis ==
On the eve of his 69th birthday, Utsugi suffers a stroke that leaves the left side of his body paralyzed. He is cared for by his sister-in-law Hana and his daughter-in-law Susu. When the family plans a summer vacation, Utsugi decides to remain at home, with Susu staying behind to care for him. As they spend time together, Utsugi begins to interpret Susu's behavior as an indication of romantic interest. Their relationship changes as they discuss their personal concerns and gradually become intimate.

== Cast ==
- Lily Franky as Utsugi
- Fan Bingbing as Satsuko
- Youki Kudoh as Hana
- Takumi Saitoh as Jokichi
- Asana Mamoru as Fumiko

== Production ==
In February 2025, the film was in pre-production state and was launched at the European Film Market. Set in Tokyo, it was expected shoot in the summer of 2025.

In October 2025, it was revealed that Fan Bingbing would work with Wayne Wang in his film Diary of a Mad Old Man. Lily Franky and Gabriel Byrne would join her in the film based on the 1961 novel of the same name by Japanese author Jun'ichirō Tanizaki.

== Release ==
Diary of a Mad Old Man had its world premiere in Gala Presentations at the 2026 Toronto International Film Festival on September 18, 2026.

It was screened in 'A Window on Asian Cinema' section of the 31st Busan International Film Festival on October 7, 2026. It will also be screened in the Gala section of 39th Tokyo International Film Festival on November 3, 2026.

London-based Bankside Films acquired the International sales rights to the film in February 2025.
