= Childhood Years: A Memoir =

Book by Junichiro Tanizaki

- Author: Jun'ichirō Tanizaki
- Translator: Paul McCarthy
- Subject: Asian Studies, Japan, Literary Studies, Asian Literature
- Genre: Memoir
- Publisher: University of Michigan Press
- ISBN: 9780472053674

Childhood Years: A Memoir (幼少時代, Yōshō Jidai) is a book written by the Japanese author Junichiro Tanizaki. It uses an informal essay style to look back on his early life in Tokyo. It was originally published in serial form in the literary magazine Bungeishunjū between April 1955 and March 1956. The book was translated into English by Paul McCarthy.
