= Miss Oyu =

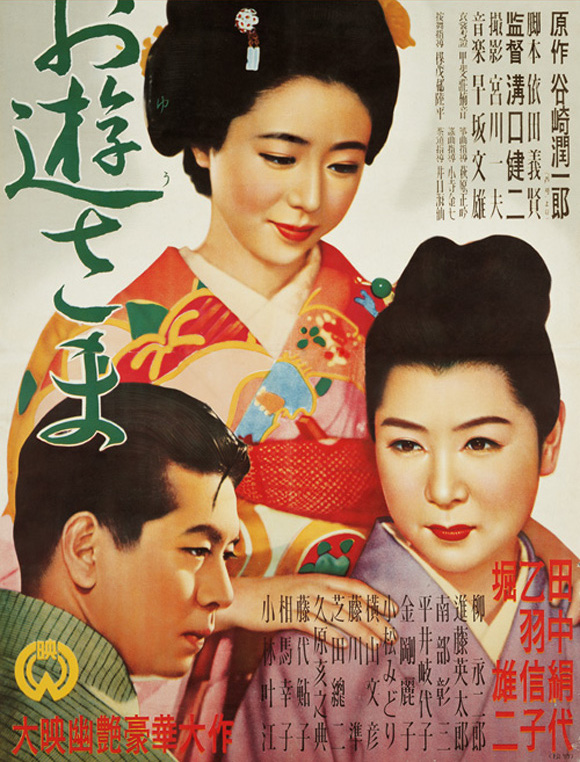
- Japanese movie poster
- Directed by: Kenji Mizoguchi
- Screenplay by: Yoshikata Yoda
- Based on: The Reed Cutter by Jun'ichirō Tanizaki
- Produced by: Masaichi Nagata
- Starring: Kinuyo Tanaka; Nobuko Otowa; Yūji Hori
- Cinematography: Kazuo Miyagawa
- Edited by: Mizuzo Miyada
- Music by: Fumio Hayasaka
- Production company: Daiei
- Distributed by: Daiei
- Release date: 22 June 1951 (Japan)
- Running time: 95 minutes
- Country: Japan
- Language: Japanese

Miss Oyu (お遊さま, Oyū-sama) is a 1951 black-and-white Japanese drama film directed by Kenji Mizoguchi. It is based on the 1932 novella The Reed Cutter (Ashikari) by Jun'ichirō Tanizaki.

== Plot ==
In 19th-century Japan, Shinnosuke is visited by Shizu and her sister Oyū to see if Shizu is a suitable marriage prospect for him. Yet, Shinnosuke is more fascinated by the older Oyū. Tradition forbids the widowed Oyū from remarrying as she has to raise her son and future heir of her deceased husband's family. So, Shinnosuke and Shizu marry as a means for him and Oyū to be as close as possible. When Oyū learns that Shizu declined to consummate the marriage as a sign of respect for her older sister and the affection between her and Shinnosuke, Oyū scolds her. Also, rumours about the true nature of their relationship start to spread, prompting Oyū to create distance between them. Later, Oyū's son dies, and she has to leave her husband's family, while Shizu dies shortly after giving birth to her and Shinnosuke's child. Shinnosuke, whose family has lost its fortune, leaves his child with the remarried Oyū and asks her in a letter to raise the child as her own.

== Cast ==
- Kinuyo Tanaka as Oyū Kayukawa
- Nobuko Otowa as Shizu
- Yūji Hori as Shinnosuke Seribashi
- Kiyoko Hirai as Osumi
- Reiko Kongo as Otsugi Kayukawa
- Eijirō Yanagi as Eitaro
- Eitarō Shindō as Kusaemon
- Kanae Kobayashi as nanny
- Fumihiko Yokoyama as book-keeper 1
- Jun Fujikawa as book-keeper 2
- Soji Shibata as book-keeper 3
- Inosuke Kuhara as boy
- Ayuko Fujishiro as waitress
- Shozo Nanbu as doctor
- Midori Komatsu as hostess
- Sachiko Aima as a flower decoration teacher
- Sumao Ishihara as priest
