= Beauty and Sadness (novel) =

Japanese novel by Yasunari Kawabata

- Author: Yasunari Kawabata
- Original title: 美しさと哀しみと; Utsukushisa to kanashimi to
- Translator: Howard Hibbett
- Language: Japanese
- Genre: Novel
- Published: 1961–63 (magazine); 1965 (book) 1975 (First English translation) 2011 (Penguin books in English)
- Publisher: Fujin Korōn Cambridge University Press; Alfred A. Knopf Penguins Modern Classics
- Publication place: Japan
- Media type: Print

Beauty and Sadness (Japanese: 美しさと哀しみと, Hepburn: Utsukushisa to kanashimi to) is a 1961–63 novel by Nobel Prize-winning Japanese author Yasunari Kawabata. The novel is narrated from the present and past perspective of the characters and how they differed from each other's point of view. A novel that provokes the mind and examines the relationship between life events, it is considered one of Kawabata's best works, though it has on occasion been criticised for its depictions of female homosexuality.

== Plot ==
Opening on the train to Kyoto, the narrative, in characteristic Kawabata fashion, subtly brings up issues of tradition and modernity as it explores writer Oki Toshio's reunion with a young lover from his past, Otoko Ueno, who is now a famous artist and recluse. Ueno is now living with her protégée and a jealous lesbian lover, Keiko Sakami, and the unfolding relationships between Oki, Otoko, and Keiko form the plot of the novel. Keiko states several times that she will avenge Otoko for Oki's abandonment, and the story coalesces into a climactic ending.

== Origins ==
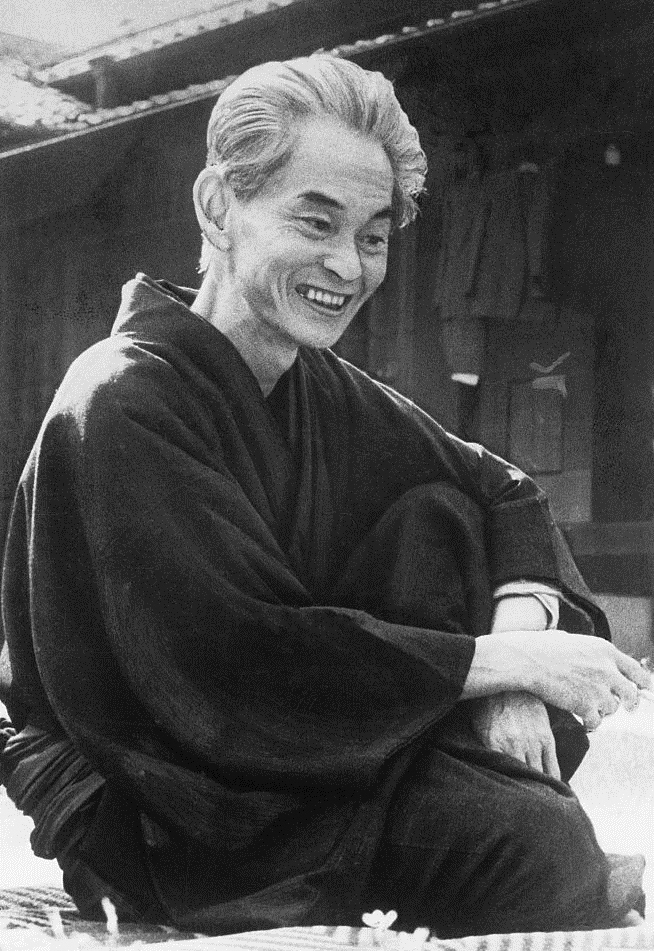
Image of Yasunari Kawabata

Yasunari Kawabata's literature often revolved around mysticism, sensualism, and tragedy; All factors present in Beauty and Sadness.

Kawabata's writing has been described by critics to be often filled with allusive imagery and suggestive sensuality. They also note that his novels would give the readers the feeling of loneliness and sorrow by finishing them off in an often vague manner; leaving the reader much to the imagination. Like his other work, Snow Country, Kawabata also incorporated this kind of ending in Beauty and Sadness. His writing incorporates the influence of Heian literature to create a story that portrays literature expressionism and realism implied in his choice of words.

== Characters ==
=== Oki Toshio ===
Oki is described as a successful novelist in his fifties at the present timeline of the novel. Despite the presence of his family, the novelist's loneliness was thought to have compelled him to visit his ex-lover and affair partner, Otoko Ueno. However, readers have expressed their curiosity as to whether he is seeking for the love with Otoko of the present, or the passionate love he had inscribed in his own novel to immortalise. This is shown through the novel with his entanglement with Otoko's female lover and protegé, Keiko Sakami in whom he saw the Otoko of his memories.

=== Ueno Otoko ===
In the present timeline, Otoko is described as a successful painter in her 30s, living with a female lover and protegé, Keiko Sakami. Her art is often recounted in the novel as a result of her miscarriage after her affair with the older married Oki, in which her baby was born prematurely, where her art was noticed to have some sort of depiction of a baby in one way or another that critics have interpreted to depict grief and longing. When meeting Oki for the first time, she was hesitant to be alone with him, and would instead send her lover to meet and escort Oki away. Although her relationship with Keiko was revealed to be that of lovers, readers have noticed that there were never any explicit description of intimate moments between the two women outside of the indication that they share a bed together. Instead, Otoko's homosexuality was rationalised in the novel as being the result of her past trauma.

=== Keiko Sakami ===
Keiko is Otoko's younger female lover and protégée. She is known in the plot to be extremely attached to her lover, whom she refers to as sensē (teacher), to the extent of wanting to take revenge on behalf of her. In the novel, she sought out to seduce both Oki and his son, Taichiro. However, as the story progressed, her lover, in addition to the readers, do not have clear knowledge of the true motives behind her actions; both wondered what the motives behind her actions towards Oki were. The matter was made controversial by some critics when taken into account that Keiko had never explicitly defined her sexuality, with the only indication of her being lesbian was her hate for men.

Keiko is criticised as being the only manipulative character in this story that can take control of the story's flow. Unlike other characters, she is able to make others act and think the way she wants them think in order to exact her revenge. In addition to a manipulative persona, her disrespect for those older than her is also noticed by readers from the often subtle depictions throughout the novel through her interactions with her own lover, in which she picks up a rude method of speech when speaking to the older woman.

=== Oki Taichiro ===
Taichiro is the son of Oki Toshio, and one of the romantic interests of Keiko Sakami. Taichiro first meets Keiko in the airport, where she was wearing a dazzling kimono. Taichiro is criticised for being submissive towards Keiko's will. One instance that was particularly pulled apart was when he did not object when Keiko confirmed their plans of marriage to his mother, allowing her to manipulate his life. His existence was interpreted by some as the reason for Otoko's pain, in which his atonement presented itself in the form of Otoko's lover, Keiko.

== Reception ==
The novel has been criticised for exploiting female homosexuality and feeding the male gaze. Others have commented on the wave of sorrow and loneliness that veils the novel, and that, despite this not being his best nor richest work, Beauty and Sadness managed to provoke the mind and that it takes an observant eye to truly recognise and comprehend the admiration this novel truly deserved.

Oki's character was thought by some critics to be a vessel that depicted Kawabata's own pondering about the flow of time and memory, in which he created a literary piece that was not bound by the time's flow but rather created a dimension between realism and abstractionism. The characters were described in different perspectives yet with the same fate in which they were unable to control by their own hands, except for Keiko. The novel also centered around the themes of innocent and youth that was fleeting and impermanent. The characters desired for that passionate happiness to stay forever, which Oki expressed through his novel immortalising his passion for the 16-year old Otoko, and Otoko through the desire to die with her lover to preserve her momentary state of happiness.

== Publication history ==
Beauty and Sadness was first serialised between January 1961 and October 1963 in Fujin Kōron and published in book form in 1965 by Chūō Kōronsha. An English translation provided by Howard Hibbett was published by Alfred A. Knopf in 1975.

== Film adaptations ==
The novel was made into film directed by Masahiro Shinoda (With Beauty and Sorrow, released 1965) and by Joy Fleury, starring Charlotte Rampling (Tristesse et beauté, released 1985). Despite the film itself not winning any awards, Kaoru Yachigusa, who played as Ueno Otoko, received an award for Best Supporting Actress for her role in this film in the Asia-Pacific Film Festival Awards (1965). The novel has also repeatedly been adapted for Japanese television.

== Bibliography ==
- Kawabata, Yasunari (2011). Beauty and Sadness. London: Penguin Modern Classics. ISBN 978-0-141-19261-1.
