= Some Prefer Nettles =

1929 Japanese novel

Some Prefer Nettles (蓼喰う虫, Tade kū mushi; Historical orthography: 蓼喰ふ蟲) is a 1929 novel by Jun'ichirō Tanizaki. It was first published in 1928–9 as a newspaper serial. The novel is often regarded as the most autobiographical of Tanizaki's works and one of his finest novels.

The Japanese title of the novel is literally water pepper-eating bugs, and is the first half of the Japanese saying tade kuu mushi mo sukizuki (蓼食う虫も好き好き), or "Water pepper-eating bugs eat it willingly", equivalent to the English "To each his own." The translation as Some Prefer Nettles was chosen by Edward Seidensticker. He considered it one of his most noted translations, and it has been included as a translation of the original saying in the authoritative Kenkyūsha's New Japanese-English Dictionary.

== Plot ==
Kaname and Misako's marriage is drifting towards separation and divorce, and Misako has taken a lover, Aso, with Kaname's approval. Their young son, Hiroshi, does not yet know anything definite about their plans. Both are procrastinating over their decision. Kaname realizes that he is fascinated by his father-in-law's obsessions with the bunraku theater and with young mistress, O-hisa. Misako's father is a traditionalist who attempts to keep the couple engaged in the arts of Japan in order to purge the negative influence from the West.

== Themes ==
=== Performance ===
The theme that structures the novel is that of performance. As the book opens, Kaname is gently pressuring his wife, Misako, into meeting her father and his mistress at a bunraku performance. The "old man" (he is fifty-six or fifty-seven) has a deep interest in many forms of traditional Japanese performance, from samisen and song to rustic puppets. But these are only the framing performances, as the life being led by Kaname and Misako is itself a performance, as Tanizaki reminds us several times. Even their son, Hiroshi, becomes a performer. The closing words of the novel transform a wooden doll into a woman. In many ways, from local accent to clothing, the central characters assume roles they need and can hardly bear, making the story a series of mirrors in which artifice and reality become interwoven.

=== East vs West ===
The dissonance between Japanese tradition and Western modernity is present throughout the novel. Kaname's aesthetic tastes lean more toward the West. His romanticized version of it is manifested in the western wing of his house, in particular the veranda on which he likes to sit, in his fascination with American movie stars, and in his skimming through an English translation of the Arabian Nights for lewd passages. However, after a visit to the bunraku theater with his wife, his father-in-law, and his father-in-law's mistress in Chapter Two, Kaname's interest in traditional aesthetics is piqued, and he even becomes envious of the "old man" and his lifestyle: watching an old play, pipe in hand, sake and a young mistress at his side. This is the beginning of Kaname's divergent interest in the East, his preference for the past.

=== Madonna vs Harlot ===
Tanizaki is known for his use of the tropes of Madonna and Harlot. In speaking with his cousin Takanatsu, Kaname reveals that he is interested in only two types of women: the motherly type and the whore type (bofugata and shoufugata, respectively). What he looks for in a woman oscillates between the two, and the fact that his wife is neither one nor the other, but a mix of both, is largely the impetus behind his waning interest in her. Kaname prefers extremes, which will become more and more apparent as the novel progresses.

There is some sort of reconciliation between these two extremes, however, and it is found in the “Eternal Woman” (eien josei), a woman to be worshiped.

=== Food ===
One scene in Tanizaki's novel takes place between the protagonist's father-in-law and his young mistress O-hisa, described as "doll-like". (O-hisa herself is a symbol of the Kansai Japanese culture of Kyoto.) His daughter, Misako, and her husband have come to his home to discuss their divorce. He asks O-hisa to look after Kaname in his home while he takes his daughter, Misako, to a restaurant. The restaurant, Hyotei, is a traditional Japanese-style restaurant (和食処, washokudokoro) in the well-to-do Nanzen-ji neighborhood of Kyoto where the eponymous Zen Temple is located.

When questioned about the food available to serve Kaname, O-hisa replies she has "only" salmon roe, baked trout and salad. When his father-in-law makes some disparaging remarks about the humble offerings, Kaname compares O-hisa's cooking favorably to the restaurant Hyotei where the "old man" will be dining with his daughter. "I'll have a feast" Kaname concludes. It is clear that O-hisa is simply being modest in her description of the food, comparing it humbly to the upscale dining at Hyotei.

Other scenes in the book detail how O-hisa was trained by Misako's father to prepare food catering to his preference for traditional Kyoto-style cuisine. Some of the particular nuances of Tanizaki's cultural references and imagery are obscure in the English translation. In a passage describing the challenges of "boiling an egg", for instance, the reader is not given any clue that the original Japanese text discussed a speciality of Kyoto-style cuisine called koya dofu (高野豆腐), a freeze dried tofu dish named after the Koyasan region from which it originates.

In contrast to the symbolism of Kyoto-style cuisine as authentic Japanese fare, Tanizaki disparages Kobe as "foreign" including items like liver sausage from a German butcher. Of Tanazaki's characters, Louise, a prostitute involved with Kaname, is the most strongly associated with Kobe fare. Though Misako's consumption of the Kobe style food is alluded to from time to time, Misako herself is more clearly associated with the eastern Japanese fare of Tokyo.

=== Dolls ===
While watching Shinjuuten no Amijima Kaname takes particular notice of the character Koharu, the doll that becomes the ideal of what Kaname thinks women should be (later to be replaced by O-hisa). The conception of womanliness that Koharu inspires in Kaname is what lies at the heart of his Madonna-Harlot conflict, and makes him attracted both to an image of the Virgin Mary and to Hollywood movie stars. He isn’t interested in real women at all, but in idealized forms of them, women who can be appreciated from afar for what they represent not for who they are. Dolls encapsulate this perfectly, being masterfully sculpted, subtle in their beauty, and silently manipulated by men.

=== Fantasy vs Reality ===
Kaname has an active fantasy life that he seemingly prefers to interact with more than he does reality. His interest in the West is rooted more in its fantastical, not necessarily accurate, elements. The same can be said for his interest in the traditional East.

An example of the former is evidenced in his preference for what he thinks is the Western concept of rapid and easy divorce. He is also fascinated with the colorfulness of western sexuality and, in particular, the way in which American films continually find new and more poignant ways of exhibiting women's beauty.

In Chapter Ten Kaname, walking alongside O-hisa with the "old man" toddling behind, is struck by the image of a dark old house. The passage that follows provides enchanting musings as to what might actually be going on behind the house's curtains, deep in the shadows beyond its latticework, as readers are given the opportunity to glance briefly into Kaname's world of fantasy.
