= Edward Seidensticker =

American Japanologist (1921–2007)

Edward G. Seidensticker
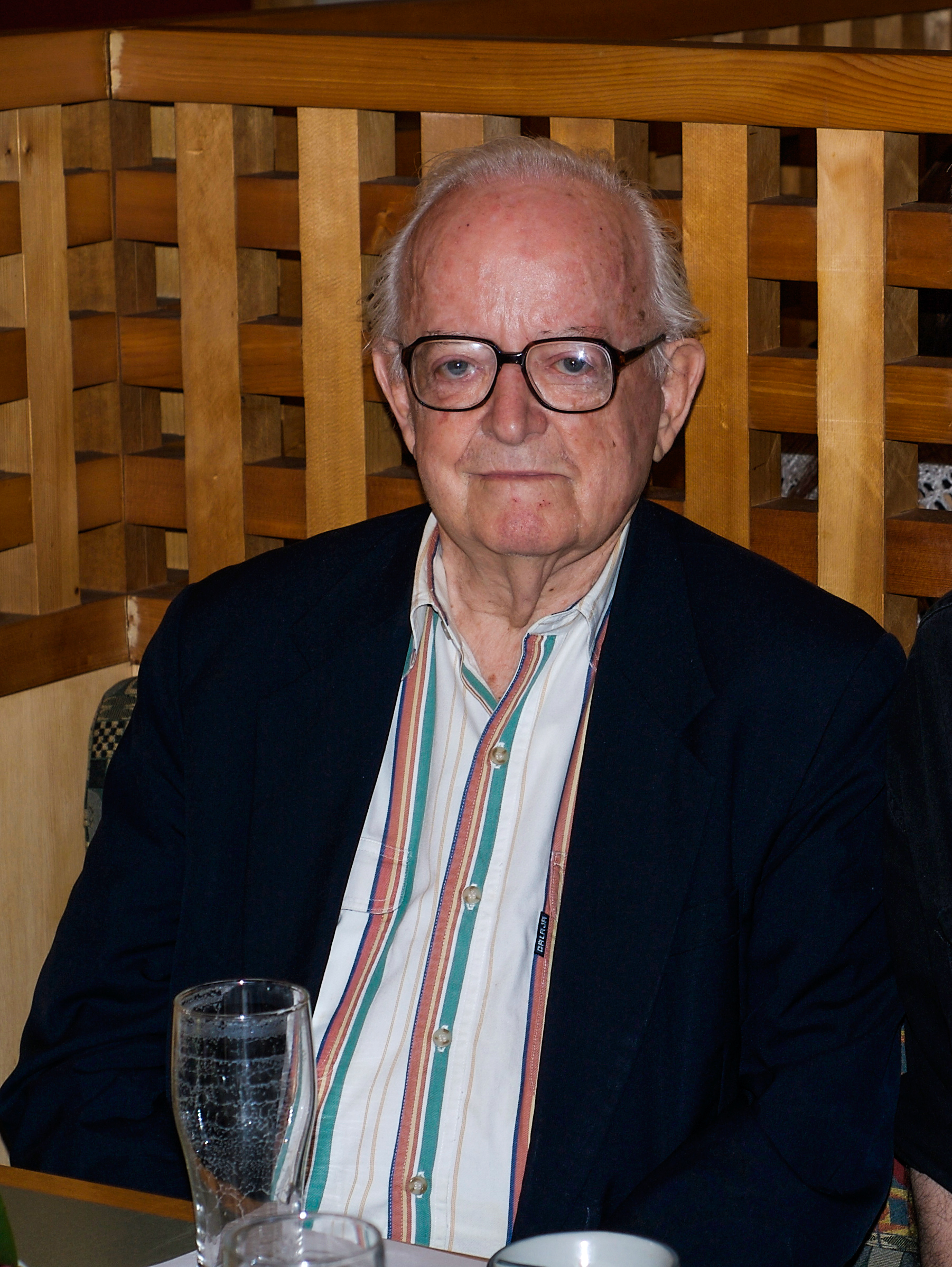
- Seidensticker in 2006
- Born: Edward George Seidensticker; February 11, 1921 Castle Rock, Colorado, U.S.
- Died: August 26, 2007 (aged 86) Tokyo, Japan
- Occupation: Translator of Japanese literature, writer, author
- Period: 1950–2006

Edward George Seidensticker (February 11, 1921 – August 26, 2007) was a noted post-World War II American scholar, historian, and preeminent translator of classical and contemporary Japanese literature. His English translation of the epic The Tale of Genji, published in 1976, was especially well received critically and is counted among the preferred modern translations.

Seidensticker is closely associated with the work of three major Japanese writers of the 20th century: Yasunari Kawabata, Jun'ichirō Tanizaki, and Yukio Mishima. His landmark translations of novels by Kawabata, in particular Snow Country (1956) and Thousand Cranes (1958), led, in part, to Kawabata being awarded the Nobel Prize in Literature in 1968.

== Biography ==
=== Early years ===
Seidensticker was born in 1921 on an isolated farmstead near Castle Rock, Colorado. His father, also named Edward G. Seidensticker, was the owner of a modest ranch that struggled financially during the 1920s and early 1930s. His mother, Mary E. Seidensticker (née Dillon), was a homemaker. Seidensticker was raised Catholic and was of German, English and Irish heritage. By high school, cognizant that he was neither athletic nor mechanically adept, he began to slip away during spare time to read Dickens and Thackeray, among others. He found Tolstoy most to his liking, the works of Mark Twain the least. He was one of the only two students in his graduating class at Douglas County High School to go off to college, the other being his older brother, William.

Seidensticker wanted to attend an East Coast university, but because of his family's financial situation he grudgingly enrolled in the University of Colorado at Boulder. It was assumed that he would study law, following in the footsteps of his grandfather and several uncles, but he chose economics, then switched to English, a choice that displeased his family. In June 1942, he graduated with a degree in English.

=== U.S. Navy Japanese Language School ===
As the 1940s unfolded, the U.S. Navy began to expand its Japanese Language School, then located at the University of California at Berkeley. After the attack on Pearl Harbor, an invitation was issued to shift the school to the University of Colorado. The navy was amenable because the forced relocation of citizens and residents of Japanese ancestry was underway along the West Coast, and most of the program's instructors were in danger of being caught up in the expanding net. By the middle of 1942, the school had completed its move to Colorado. Among those who came east to Boulder with the program was student Donald Keene. Seidensticker, who had been seeking a way to manage through the war without being drafted, saw the Japanese Language School as a solution. He traveled to Washington, D.C. for a school-admittance interview, the first time he had been east of Chicago, and was accepted. Upon completion of the 14-month intensive program, he was able to read a Japanese language newspaper, albeit with some difficulty. The "Boulder Boys," as the men who attended the language school were fondly called (a handful of women later joined the program as well), were given the choice of becoming officers in the Navy or Marine Corps. Seidensticker selected the Marines due to an abundance of "boyish romanticism."

=== War years ===
Seidensticker received basic training with the Marines in North Carolina, after which he was shifted to Camp Pendleton on the West Coast. It was in California that he first encountered Japanese prisoners of war, with whom he was to practice his Japanese. Late in 1944 he and his language-officer colleagues were transferred to the Hawaiian Islands and Pearl Harbor. They were given duties to translate captured documents and to interrogate prisoners of war, a task Seidensticker found increasingly distasteful. In February 1945, Seidensticker was boarded on a ship bound for Iwo Jima. He was not among the first waves of troops to land during the battle, but before long, found himself on the beach "loaded down with dictionaries." By then the gunfire had ceased as the Japanese had retreated north to bunkers and caves. Later, he reminisced in his memoirs that while he may have been in danger a few times, he had little awareness of being afraid. Near the end of his deployment, after the island had been declared "secure," he climbed Mount Suribachi, the site of Joe Rosenthal's iconic flag-raising photograph. He was then rotated back to Hawaii. During that stay, the atomic bombs were dropped and the war with Japan came to an end. Although Seidensticker was deeply unsettled by the dropping of the bomb, he approved of Truman's decision. In his memoirs, he noted, "Had I been at Harry's Desk, I would have made the decision he made. The important things were to get the war over and to save lives; and that more lives, American and Japanese, were saved by the bombing than were destroyed by it seems the next thing to certain."

=== Occupation of Japan and foreign service ===
About a month after General Douglas MacArthur arrived in Tokyo to assume control of Japan, Seidensticker landed with the Marines at Sasebo, a naval base city in Nagasaki Prefecture. He was assigned duties disarming Japanese forces and disabling heavy weapons on the islands of Tsushima and Hirado. It was during his few months at Sasebo that Seidensticker began to develop a deeper appreciation of Japan and the Japanese people. In early 1946 he was sent to San Diego and discharged.

On his return to the United States, Seidensticker enrolled at Columbia University and took a master's degree in 1947 in what was then known as "public law and government." He joined the U.S. Foreign Service and, after further studies during a summer at Yale University and a year at Harvard, was placed in Tokyo assigned to the Diplomatic Section of the Supreme Commander for the Allied Powers (SCAP). In May 1950, roughly two years after he arrived in Japan, Seidensticker decided the Foreign Service was not his calling and he resigned on his own initiative. He had not been promoted while colleagues had, and had deemed himself not the salaryman type. Moreover, he sensed a "witch-hunting" in which bachelors were subjected to "peculiar rumors" and a skeptical eye. He also suspected his room at the Daiichi Hotel, his billet, was bugged.

=== Scholar, educator, and latter years ===
After his short Foreign Service tenure, Seidensticker studied Japanese literature at the University of Tokyo on the GI Bill and later under a Ford Foundation grant. With the Ford fellowship, Seidensticker switched his focus from studying Heian literature to that of modern Japanese literature. In his remaining years at Tokyo University he read virtually the entire canon of modern Japanese literature. By the mid-1950s, having exhausted the fellowship circuit, he found work as a lecturer of both American and Japanese literature at Sophia University. While Seidensticker enjoyed his time at Sophia, at the time it did not pay well and he took on a free-lance writing assignments and other part-time jobs. In 1954 he was contacted by Harold Strauss, the chief editor at the New York publishing house Alfred A. Knopf about translating Japanese literature for Knopf, and was soon at work.

As the 1960s began to unfold, Seidensticker, growing weary of life in Japan and living life as an outsider, began to consider returning to the United States. In 1962, when an invitation was extended by Stanford University to substitute for a professor on special assignment, he readily accepted and returned to the U.S. after having lived full-time in Japan from 1948 to 1962. Seidensticker taught at Stanford as professor of Japanese from 1962 to 1966. He then joined the faculty at the University of Michigan and remained there for 11 years before being drawn away in 1978 to join the faculty of Columbia University as professor of Japanese. He retired from Columbia in 1985 and was thereafter professor emeritus. During retirement he divided his time between Hawaii and Japan. In 2007, while taking a walk near Shinobazu Pond in the Ueno district of Tokyo, he fell and later died because of head injuries. He was 86.

== Translator ==
Seidensticker is widely regarded as one of the greatest translators of classic and modern Japanese literature into English. His translations have been described as "brilliant" and "elegant." One contemporary scholar noted that in Seidensticker's translations, "You could feel the emotions and nuances that the original writer wanted to convey." He has even been described as "the best" translator of Japanese literature.

Seidensticker won the National Book Award in category Translation for his edition of Kawabata's The Sound of the Mountain (a split award). He also translated The Decay of the Angel, the last volume of Yukio Mishima's Sea of Fertility tetralogy, and several of Mishima's stories. Seidensticker translated Jun'ichirō Tanizaki's The Makioka Sisters and Some Prefer Nettles and authored important criticism on Tanizaki's place in 20th-century Japanese literature. The New York Times obituary allowed the translator to speak for himself:

During his years in Japan Mr. Seidensticker became friends with many of the writers he translated, though the friendships were sometimes tested during the delicate diplomatic dance that is central to the translator's art. As Mr. Seidensticker recalled in Tokyo Central, some writers required more dancing than others:

"Tanizaki wrote clear, rational sentences," Mr. Seidensticker wrote. "I do not, certainly, wish to suggest that I disapprove of such sentences; but translating them is not very interesting. There was little I felt inclined to ask Tanizaki about."

Not so with Kawabata. "Do you not, my esteemed master, find this a rather impenetrable passage?" Mr. Seidensticker recalled asking him, ever so gently, during the translation of Snow Country.

"He would dutifully scrutinize the passage, and answer: 'Yes,'" Mr. Seidensticker wrote. "Nothing more."

The last work he supervised translating into English was You Were Born for a Reason on Japanese Buddhism.

== Japanologist ==
Seidensticker wrote widely on Japan, its people, as well as the city of Tokyo.

His first major non-translation work, "Kafū the Scribbler: The Life and Writings of Nagai Kafū, 1879–1959" (Stanford University Press, 1965), was a biography of Kafū Nagai, the Japanese writer who is noted for his sensitive depictions of the denizens of Tokyo's pleasure quarters. It was the first study to examine the life and works of Nagai to appear in any Western language. As the book includes a number of Seidensticker translations of Nagai's short stories and novellas, it is neither pure biography nor criticism. Seidensticker, to his lifelong regret, never met Kafū, even though there were opportunities to be introduced.

In Low City, High City: Tokyo from Edo to the Earthquake (1983) and Tokyo Rising: The City Since the Great Earthquake (1990), Seidensticker's two-volume history of Tokyo, he weaves a tale of cultural history of how the city was impacted by the advent of Westernization, and how it responded to the twin disasters of the 20th Century—the Great Kanto earthquake of 1923 and the massive destruction incurred in World War II due to Allied bombing raids.

He published his autobiographical observations in Tokyo Central: A Memoir in 2001. A biography and bibliography are included in a commemorative work created by those whose lives he affected, New Leaves: Studies and Translations of Japanese Literature in Honor of Edward Seidensticker (1993).

After retirement, he divided his time between Honolulu and Tokyo. He described the latter as "the world's most consistently interesting city".

=== Honors ===
- Order of the Rising Sun, Gold Rays with Neck Ribbon, Third Class, 1975
- Kikuchi Kan Prize, 1977
- Japan Foundation Award, 1984

== Selected works ==
=== Author ===
- Japan (New York: Time, Inc., 1961)
- Kafu the Scribbler: The Life and Writings of Nagai Kafu, 1879–1959 (Stanford, California: Stanford University Press, 1965)
- Genji Days (Tokyo: Kodansha International, 1977).
- This Country, Japan (Tokyo: Kodansha International, 1979).
- Low City, High City: Tokyo from Edo to the Earthquake: How the Shogun's Ancient Capital Became a Great Modern City, 1867–1923 (New York: Alfred A. Knopf, 1983).
- Tokyo Rising: The City Since the Great Earthquake (New York: Alfred A. Knopf, 1990).
- Very Few People Come This Way: Lyrical Episodes from the Year of the Rabbit (Honolulu: University of Hawaii Press, 1996).
- Tokyo Central: A Memoir (Seattle: University of Washington Press, 2002.
- The Snake That Bowed (Berkeley: Printed Matter Press, 2006).

=== Translator ===
- Tanizaki, Jun'ichirō. Some Prefer Nettles (New York: Alfred A. Knopf, 1955).
- Kawabata, Yasunari. Snow Country (New York: Alfred A. Knopf, 1956).
- Tanizaki, Jun'ichirō. The Makioka Sisters (New York: Alfred A. Knopf, 1957).
- Kawabata, Yasunari. Thousand Cranes (New York: Alfred A. Knopf, 1958).
- The Mother of Michitsuna. The Gossamer Years: The Diary of a Noblewoman of Heian Japan (Tokyo and Rutland, Vermont: Charles E. Tuttle Publishing, 1964).
- Nagai, Kafu. "A Strange Tale from East of the River" (plus nine other works) in Kafu the Scribbler: The Life and Writings of Nagai Kafu, 1879–1959 (Stanford, California: Stanford University Press, 1965).
- Kawabata, Yasunari. House of the Sleeping Beauties and Other Stories (Tokyo and Palo Alto, California: Kodansha International Ltd., 1969).
- Kawabata, Yasunari. The Sound of the Mountain (New York: Alfred A. Knopf, 1970).
- Kawabata, Yasunari. The Master of Go (New York: Alfred A. Knopf, 1972).
- Mishima, Yukio. The Decay of the Angel (New York: Alfred A. Knopf, 1974).
- Kawabata, Yasunari; Inoue, Yasushi. The Izu Dancer & Other Stories. (Tokyo and Rutland, Vermont: Charles E. Tuttle Publishing, 1974).
- Murasaki Shikibu. The Tale of Genji (New York: Alfred A. Knopf, 1976).
- Tanizaki, Jun'ichirō. In Praise of Shadows (Sedgwick, Maine: Leete's Island Books, Inc., 1977). Note: Translated by Thomas J. Harper and Edward G. Seidensticker.
- Inoue, Yasushi. Lou-Lan and Other Stories (Tokyo: Kodansha International Ltd., 1979). Note: Translated by James T. Araki and Edward G. Seidensticker
