= Quicksand (Tanizaki novel) =

Novel by Junichiro Tanizaki

- Author: Juni'chiro Tanizaki
- Publication date: 1931

Quicksand, originally published in Japan as Manji (Japanese: 卍), is a novel by the Japanese author Jun'ichirō Tanizaki. It was written in serial format between 1928 and 1930 for the magazine Kaizō. The last of Tanizaki's major novels translated into English, it concerns a four-way bisexual love affair between upper-crust denizens of Osaka.

== Title ==
The Japanese title, Manji, refers to the four-pronged Buddhist swastika, a symbol of the four lovers. The English title refers to the destructive cycle of obsession and jealousy faced by the four main characters.

== Plot ==
The story is narrated by Sonoko Kakiuchi, a young woman from Osaka. At the start of the novel she lives comfortably with her husband Kotaro, and attends art classes at a local women's school. Rumors spread around the school that Sonoko is having a lesbian affair with another student, the beautiful young Mitsuko. Sonoko finds herself drawn to Mitsuko, though she barely knows her, and she proceeds to forge a friendship with her. Soon, she invites Mitsuko to her house to pose nude for her figure drawing. Mitsuko agrees, but insists on covering herself with a sheet. The sexual tension comes to a head when Sonoko rips the sheet away, thus sealing her infatuation. The two begin a fiery affair.

Things are complicated by the arrival of Watanuki Eijiro, Mitsuko's sometime fiancé. The effeminate, impotent Watanuki reveals that Mitsuko had intended to marry him, but now refuses unless he allows her affair with Sonoko to continue. Sonoko begins to sense that Mitsuko has been manipulating them both, but is far too mired in her infatuation – the quicksand of the title – to back out. Meanwhile, Sonoko's husband Kotaro has taken notice of her infatuation with Mitsuko. He attempts to put an end to it, but Sonoko will not be dissuaded. After a few chance meetings, Kotaro falls under Mitsuko's spell as well, and attempts to get closer to her. One evening when all three are sleeping in bed together, Sonoko awakens to find Kotaro having intercourse with Mitsuko. Knowing that their ménage à trois is doomed, Sonoko, Kotaro, and Mitsuko form a suicide pact, in which they will kill themselves with poison-laced sleeping powder. In the event, however, Sonoko wakes up, realizing that Kotaro and Mitsuko have withheld the poison from her dose, a final betrayal.

== Development history ==
The novel was first published serially in the magazine Kaizō between 1928 and 1930. An English translation by Howard Hibbett was published in 1994 by Alfred A. Knopf.

== Adaptations ==
=== Film ===
The novel has been adapted to film several times:

| Role | 1964 | 1983 | 1998 | 2006 | 2023 |
Cast
| Mitsuko Sido | Ayako Wakao | Kanako Higuchi | Tomoko Mayumi | Fujiko | Manami Shindo |
| Sonoko Kakiuchi | Kyōko Kishida | Haruna Takase | Kaori Sakagami | Cosmosco | Noriko Kijima |
| Kotaro Kakiuchi | Eiji Funakoshi | Yoshio Harada | Sei Hiraizumi | | Shima Ônishi |
Crew
| Screenwriter | Kaneto Shindō | Masaru Baba | Jun Miyamoto | Noboru Iguchi | Kaori Kotani |
| Director | Yasuzo Masumura | Hiroto Yokoyama | Mitsunori Hattori | Noboru Iguchi | Kishū Izuchi |

- 1985: adapted as Italo-German film The Berlin Affair, directed by Liliana Cavani, with the setting changed to Nazi Germany.
- 2024: adapted as 卍 リバース (Manji Reverse), directed by Tadaaki Horai, a gender swap portrayal set in modern day Japan.

=== Games ===
- A 1984 PC-88 game by CSK Research Institute is based on the novel.
