= The Makioka Sisters =

Book by Jun'ichirō Tanizaki

- Author: Jun'ichirō Tanizaki
- Original title: 細雪
- Translator: Edward G. Seidensticker
- Language: Japanese
- Genre: Literary fiction
- Publication date: serial novel, collected in 1948
- Publication place: Japan
- English publication date: 1957
- Media type: Print
- Pages: 530

The Makioka Sisters (細雪, Sasameyuki; "light snow") is a novel by Japanese writer Jun'ichirō Tanizaki that was serialized from 1943 to 1948. It follows the lives of the wealthy Makioka family of Osaka from the autumn of 1936 to April 1941, focusing on the family's attempts to find a husband for the third sister, Yukiko. It depicts the decline of the family's upper-middle-class, suburban lifestyle as the specter of World War II and Allied Occupation hangs over the novel.

It was translated into English by Edward G. Seidensticker, and published by Alfred A. Knopf.

Patrick McCoy of The Japan Times described the book as being "Tolstoyan in length and scope."

== Story ==
=== Title ===
The novel's title, Sasameyuki (細雪), means lightly falling snow and is also used in classical Japanese poetry. The image suggests falling cherry blossoms in early spring—a number of poets confess to confusing falling cherry blossoms with snow. Falling cherry blossoms are a common symbol of impermanence, a prevalent theme of the novel. The "yuki" (雪, snow) in Sasameyuki is the same as the yuki in Yukiko's name, suggesting that she is the central character of the novel.

These nuances do not translate well into English. The translator, Edward Seidensticker, struggled over the title. Translations like "Fine Snow" and "Snow Flurries" do not convey the elegance or layers of meaning in the Japanese title.

=== Characters ===
- Tsuruko (鶴子), the eldest Makioka sister and mistress of the main house
- Sachiko (幸子), the second-oldest Makioka sister and mistress of the Ashiya branch house
- Yukiko (雪子), the third Makioka sister; thirty and unmarried, shy and retiring
- Taeko (妙子), the youngest Makioka sister; unable to marry Okubata until a husband has been found for Yukiko
- Tatsuo (辰雄), Tsuruko's husband and head of the family, a cautious bank employee who has taken the Makioka name
- Teinosuke (貞之助), Sachiko's husband, an accountant who has also taken the Makioka name
- Etsuko (悦子), young daughter of Sachiko and Teinosuke
- O-haru (お春), a maid at the Ashiya house
- Okubata (奥畑), son of a prominent Osaka merchant family, has tried to elope with Taeko
- Itakura (板倉), a photographer and former clerk at the Okubatas’ jewelry store
- Itani (井谷), owner of the beauty parlor the Makioka sisters patronize, enjoys acting as a go-between in marriage negotiations

=== Plot ===
Book One

The Makiokas are an upper-middle-class family from Osaka, Japan. At the time of their father's prime, they were one of the wealthiest families in the region, but over the last generation their fortunes have fallen into decline. The main branch lives in Osaka, at the family home, and consists of the eldest sister, Tsuruko, her husband, Tatsuo, who has taken the Makioka name, and their six children. The branch house is located in Ashiya, an affluent suburb between Osaka and Kobe, and consists of the second-oldest sister, Sachiko, her husband, Teinosuke (also an adopted Makioka), and their young daughter, Etsuko. Tsuruko and Sachiko have two younger sisters, Yukiko and Taeko, who are unmarried and move between the main house and the branch house.

As the novel opens, the Makiokas' pride has led them to dismiss the numerous marriage proposals they have received for Yukiko in the past, but, now that their fortunes have declined, the rate of proposals has slowed, and Yukiko, now thirty, remains without a husband. To make matters worse, her name was mistakenly printed in place of Taeko's in a local newspaper story: Taeko had run away with Okubata. Tatsuo demanded a retraction, but instead, the newspaper ran a correction, replacing Yukiko's name with Taeko's. The article embarrassed the Makioka family and stained both Yukiko's and Taeko's names; unhappy with the way Tatsuo handled the affair and generally dissatisfied with his cautious nature, Yukiko and Taeko have begun spending most of their time at the Ashiya house. In the wake of the newspaper incident, Taeko finds refuge in doll making—she is quite skilled, and her dolls are sold in department stores. She convinces Sachiko to find her a studio, where she spends a great deal of time working on her dolls.

Itani brings Sachiko a marriage prospect, a man named Segoshi. Hurried by Itani, the family agrees to an informal ”miai” (見合い, a formal marriage interview) before they can thoroughly check Segoshi's background. The Makiokas become optimistic about their chances of making the match, but are eventually forced to decline when they discover that Segoshi's mother is afflicted with a kind of dementia which was considered hereditary.

A few months later, Sachiko receives word of another marriage prospect, this time from an old classmate, Mrs. Jimba. The prospective groom is a middle-aged widower named Nomura. Sachiko is not particularly excited about him, because of his aged appearance, but decides to have him investigated all the same. She asks Mrs. Jimba to give them one or two months to make a decision. In the meantime, the bank Tatsuo works for has decided to send him to Tokyo to manage a branch office. Despite Tsuruko's attachment to the Osaka house, both her and her husband sorely need additional income, as Tatsuo's inheritance from the Makioka's father is running out. As a result, he and his family will move to Tokyo, and it is decided that Yukiko and Taeko should go with them. Taeko is allowed to stay in Ashiya for a short while to tend to her business, but Yukiko is to leave immediately.

Yukiko is unhappy in Tokyo, and Tsuruko suggests they send her back to Osaka for a while. A follow-up letter regarding Nomura arrives from Mrs. Jimba, just as Sachiko is searching for an excuse to send for Yukiko. Though not enthusiastic about the match, the Makiokas agree to a miai as a pretense for bringing Yukiko back to Ashiya.

Shortly before the miai, Sachiko has a miscarriage, and the Makiokas are forced to postpone meeting Nomura. When Sachiko, Teinosuke, and Yukiko finally meet him, a week later, Sachiko is surprised at how old he looks. After dinner, they are taken back to Nomura's house, where he shows them the Buddhist altar where he prays for his dead wife and children. Yukiko, put off by his insensitivity, declares that she cannot marry him. The family refuses Nomura's marriage proposal, and Yukiko is sent back to Tokyo.

Book Two

Taeko's interest in dolls wanes and she begins to devote time to Western-style sewing and traditional Osaka dance, taught by Yamamura Saku. A dance recital is held at the Ashiya house with Taeko as one of the performers. A personable young photographer named Itakura takes pictures at the request of Okubata. Itakura and Taeko are already acquainted; he photographs her dolls.

A month later, a disastrous flood strikes the Kansai region. Taeko is attending a sewing school in the area hardest hit. Itakura rescues her. Impressed by his heroism, Taeko begins to fall for him. Sometime after this, Taeko's dancing teacher dies, an occurrence that not only shows the changing times—in order to support her craft, Saku is revealed to have had lived in an extraordinarily small and empty house—but also foils Taeko's dreams to be named a successor in the Yamamura school. As a result, she turns her attention yet again towards dress-making.

Eventually Taeko and Itakura's relationship becomes suspect to Okubata, who sends a letter to Sachiko. When Sachiko brings up the matter with Taeko, she reveals that she has grown dissatisfied with Okubata as a result of his infidelity towards her, and now intends to marry Itakura. Sachiko, however, is disgusted with Itakura for his lower-class upbringing, and opposes her decision; nevertheless, despite the prospect of being disinherited by the main branch, Taeko is determined to marry him.

Taeko wants to study fashion design in France with her sewing teacher and asks Sachiko to convince the main house to support her, a decision which is opposed by the main house on the grounds that when Taeko inevitably marries Okubata, she will have no need to support herself—looking for alternative sources of money, then, could indicate she plans on spurring his advances. When Taeko's sewing teacher abandons her plans to go to France, Taeko decides to open a Western-style dress shop. She goes to Tokyo to ask the main house for money, but is immediately called back to Osaka because Itakura has fallen ill.

Itakura is hospitalized for an inner-ear infection and dies of gangrene resulting from complications of surgery. Itakura's death alleviates Sachiko's concern that Taeko will marry below their class. Taeko, however, attends for five of the seven weeks of memorial services held for the photographer after his death.

Book Three

In June, Tatsuo's eldest sister alerts Sachiko of a marriage prospect, a Mr. Sawazaki from a prominent Nagoya family. Sachiko, Yukiko, Taeko, and Etsuko visit Tatsuo's sister in Ōgaki so that Yukiko can attend the miai. The miai does not go well: Sachiko is left with a negative impression, and Sawazaki rejects the marriage. This is the first time the Makiokas have been refused by a marriage prospect.

Upon her return, Sachiko hears that Taeko has taken up again with Okubata. As the relationship grows increasingly public, Teinosuke informs Tsuruko. Tsuruko demands that Taeko be sent to Tokyo; Taeko refuses and is disinherited.

Later, Itani presents another marriage prospect for Yukiko. The potential suitor, Hashidera, is an attractive candidate, but he is uncertain if he wants to remarry. Teinosuke takes Yukiko to meet him and goes to great lengths to see the match through, but Yukiko's shyness causes Hashidera to call off the negotiations.

Just after this, Sachiko is informed that Taeko has fallen severely ill at Okubata's house. At first, it is assumed that she has dysentery, but the diagnosis is later changed to anthrax. Taeko's condition grows progressively worse, and the sisters are torn between finding better care and allowing Taeko to be seen at Okubata's house. Eventually she is moved to the hospital of a family friend, where she slowly recovers.

Meanwhile, Sachiko is told that Taeko has been living off Okubata since being disinherited. Sachiko also hears that Taeko may be involved with a bartender named Miyoshi. Sachiko is aghast, but now sees a marriage between Taeko and Okubata as a necessity. After Taeko has recovered, Sachiko learns that Okubata is being pressured by his family to go to Manchuria; Sachiko and Yukiko think that Taeko should go with him. Taeko objects, but Yukiko pushes her, saying that she is indebted to Okubata for everything he has given her. Taeko leaves the house in tears and stays away for two days. Okubata eventually decides against going to Manchuria.

The Makiokas also learn that Itani is planning to sell her shop and travel to America, but before her departure, Itani informs Sachiko that she has another suitor for Yukiko. His name is Mimaki, an illegitimate son of a viscount. The sisters travel to Tokyo to meet him, and he quickly charms them. While in Tokyo, Taeko tells Sachiko that she is four months pregnant with Miyoshi's child. Sachiko and Teinosuke arrange for Taeko to have the baby secretly at Arima. To protect the Makiokas’ reputation, Teinosuke asks Okubata to remain silent about Taeko's behavior. Okubata agrees, on the condition that Teinosuke compensate him for the money he has spent on Taeko. Teinosuke agrees to pay him two thousand yen. Taeko's baby dies at birth, and Taeko moves in with Miyoshi.

The Makiokas are pressed to answer Mimaki's marriage proposal. Yukiko accepts, whereupon Teinosuke sends a letter to the main house asking for their consent. The wedding date and location are set, and a house is secured for the new couple. Yukiko is not excited when her wedding kimono arrives and suffers from explosive, rancid, and gassy mushy diarrhea , which persists on the train ride to Tokyo.

== Background ==
Tanizaki was born in Tokyo in 1886. After the 1923 Great Kantō earthquake and fire, which destroyed Tokyo, he settled permanently in Kansai, the region where The Makioka Sisters is set. Many of the characters and events in The Makioka Sisters are loosely based on real people and events: Sachiko is modeled after Tanizaki's third wife, Matsuko, and Sachiko's sisters correspond to Matsuko's. Sachiko's husband, Teinosuke, does not resemble Tanizaki, however. The Makioka Sisters spans the period from autumn 1936 to April 1941, ending about seven months before the Japanese attack on Pearl Harbor. The novel references a number of contemporary events, such as the Kobe flood of 1938, the Second Sino-Japanese War, and the growing tensions in Europe. Publication began in 1943, at the height of World War II. The popularity of the novel attracted the attention of government censors, who ordered that publication be halted, saying: “The novel goes on and on detailing the very thing we are most supposed to be on our guard against during this period of wartime emergency: the soft, effeminate, and grossly individualistic lives of women.”

== Themes ==
Decline and decay are prominent themes of The Makioka Sisters and are emphasized by the repetition of certain events. The succession of Yukiko's suitors, the Makiokas’ yearly cherry-viewing excursions, and the increasing severity of illness in the novel form a pattern of “decline-in-repetition”. In reaction to this decline, the characters long for an idealized past—they attempt to remain connected to their past through yearly rituals and observances. The Makiokas’ adherence to these rituals connects them to the traditions of the merchant class from the Edo period and reflects Tanizaki's belief that the Edo-period culture had been preserved in Osaka. Throughout, the novel contrasts the Kansai and Kantō regions. "Tokyo's poverty, bleakness, and disorder serve to set off Ashiya's harmonious integration of tradition, modernity, and cosmopolitanism". By extolling the virtues of the Kansai region in contrast to Tokyo, Tanizaki may have been making a political statement. The unfavorable comparison of Tokyo to Kansai "in the context of the war years, [is] a subversive reminder of the nonmilitary roots of Japanese culture and a sort of 'secret history' of Japan from 1936 to 1941".

== Publication ==
Sasameyuki began as a serial in the magazine Chūō Kōron in 1943, but publication was halted by the Information Bureau of the Japanese War Ministry after two installments, the first in the issue for New Year 1943 (now Book 1, Chapters 1 to 8) the second in the issue for March 1943 (now Book 1, Chapters 9 to 13). In 1944, Tanizaki published 248 copies of a privately printed edition of Book One, with financial backing from Chūō Kōron; this was, again, censured by the military. After the conclusion of World War II, the novel was published in three parts: Book 1 in 1946, Book 2 in 1947, and Book 3 in 1948.

== Reception and legacy ==
The novel has been called “the greatest cosmopolitan novel since the Meiji Restoration”. Following its success, Tanizaki was awarded the Mainichi Prize for Publication and Culture and the Asahi Culture Prize. The novel has been translated into at least 14 languages. The English translation, by Edward G. Seidensticker, was published in 1957 as The Makioka Sisters.

According to Charles E. Hamilton of the University of California, Berkeley, many reviews in the United States of the English translation were "marked by an air of discomfiture", with some reviews being uncivil and others offering "factitious praise".

Donald Barr of The New York Times compared and contrasted the English translation of the novel with Pride and Prejudice by Jane Austen. Barr concluded that The Makioka Sisters "has in an immense degree the power of veracity, which is second only to the power of truth." Hamilton argued that Barr's comparison with Austen was done "inaptly". Time stated that the book had "a heroism that [...] bends to the winds of fate like a reed and, never breaking, wins the subtler triumph of endurance." Time stated that significant portions of the book "are dull enough to make U.S. readers wonder if they are not in the hands of the Japanese sandman." According to Hamilton, Anthony West of The New Yorker, in Hamilton's own words, "guyed the book at scurrilous length as a mere exercise in medical naturalism."

Hamilton himself called the translation in the English version "skillful". One criticism Hamilton had was the loss of the Kansai dialect in the translation.

== Adaptations ==
Film

- Sasameyuki. Directed by Yutaka Abe. Tokyo: New Tōhō Company. 1950.
- Sasameyuki. Directed by Koji Shima. Tokyo: The Greater Japan Motion Picture Company. 1959.
- The Makioka Sisters. Directed by Kon Ichikawa. Tokyo: Toho Co., Ltd.. 1983.

Television

- Sasameyuki. Nippon Television Network Corporation. Tokyo. 1957.
- Sasameyuki. NET (Now, TV Asahi Corporation). Tokyo. 1959.
- Sasameyuki. Nippon Television Network Corporation. Tokyo. 1965.
- Sasameyuki. Fuji Television Network, Inc. Tokyo. 1966.
- Sasameyuki. Yomiuri Telecasting Corporation. Osaka. 1980.

== Bibliography ==
- Boscaro, Adriana. “Tanizaki in Western Languages.” Ann Arbor: Center for Japanese Studies, The University of Michigan, 2000.
- Chambers, Anthony H. The Secret Window: Ideal Worlds in Tanizaki’s Fiction. Cambridge, Mass., and London: Harvard University Press, 1994.
- Chambers, Anthony H. “The Makioka Sisters as a Political Novel,” in A Tanizaki Feast: The International Symposium in Venice. Ed. Adriana Boscaro and Anthony H. Chambers. Ann Arbor: Center for Japanese Studies, The University of Michigan, 1998. 133–138.
- Chiba Shunji. “The Makioka Sisters as an Emaki,” in A Tanizaki Feast: The International Symposium in Venice. Ed. Adriana Boscaro and Anthony H. Chambers. Ann Arbor: Center for Japanese Studies, The University of Michigan, 1998. 125–131.
- Gatten, Aileen. “Edward Seidensticker: A Biography,” in New Leaves: Studies in Translations of Japanese Literature in Honor of Edward Seidensticker. Ed. Aileen Gatten and Anthony H. Chambers. Ann Arbor: Center for Japanese Studies, The University of Michigan. 1993. 1–4.
- Hamilton, Charles E. (1958). "Seidensticker, tr., The Makioka Sisters (Book Review)". Journal of Asian Studies. 17 (4): 629. doi:10.2307/2941202. JSTOR 2941202. - See document on ProQuest
- Ito, Ken. “Fair Dreams of Hanshin,” in Visions of Desire: Tanizaki’s Fictional Worlds. Stanford, Calif.: Stanford University Press, 1991. 185–208.
- Johnston, William. “Illness, Disease, and Medicine in Three Novels by Tanizaki,” in A Tanizaki Feast: The International Symposium in Venice. Ed. Adriana Boscaro and Anthony H. Chambers. Ann Arbor: Center for Japanese Studies, The University of Michigan, 1998. 139–150.
- Keene, Donald. “Japanese Writers and the Greater East Asia War.” The Journal of Asian Studies 23.2 (February, 1964): 209–225.
- Keene, Donald. “Tanizaki Jun’ichirō,” in Dawn to the West: Japanese Literature in the Modern Era. New York: Holt, Rinheart, and Winston, 1984. 720–785.
- Nakamura Shin’ichirō. “Tanizaki to Sasameyuki,” in Tanizaki Jun’ichirō, pp. 56–67. Nihon bunkagu kenkyū shiryō sōsho. Yūseidō, 1972.
- Noguchi Takehiko. “Time in the World of Sasameyuki.” Trans. Teruko Craig. Journal of Japanese Studies 3.1 (Winter, 1977): 1–36.
- Richie, Donald. "The Film Adaptations," in A Tanizaki Feast: The International Symposium in Venice. Ed. Adriana Boscaro and Anthony H. Chambers. Ann Arbor: Center for Japanese Studies, The University of Michigan, 1998. 163–170.
- Rubin, Jay. Injurious to Public Morals: Writers and the Meiji State. Seattle: University of Washington Press, 1984.
- Seidensticker, Edward G. "Introduction," in The Makioka Sisters. New York: Everyman's Library, 1993. ix–xxiii.
