= The Secret History of the Lord of Musashi =

1935 novel by Jun'ichirō Tanizaki

- Author: Jun'ichirō Tanizaki
- Original title: 武州公秘話 (Bushukō hiwa)
- Translator: Anthony H. Chambers
- Language: Japanese
- Genre: Novel
- Publisher: Chuokoronsha
- Publication date: October 1935; First appeared in Shin Seinen October 1931-November 1932
- Publication place: Japan
- English publication date: 1982, Alfred A. Knopf

The Secret History of the Lord of Musashi (武州公秘話, Bushukō hiwa) is a novel by Jun'ichirō Tanizaki. It was serialized in publisher Hakubunkan's magazine Shin Seinen from October 1931 to November 1932. (Note: On the afternoon of 9 February 1930, On Watanabe, author and an editor of New Seinen, together with translator Shuji Hasegawa, visited Tanizaki's house in Kobe to persuade him to write an essay for the magazine. Tanizaki had previously said he was unable to write the essay, but agreed to write and hand over the manuscript by the evening of the 10th, the next day. Watanabe decided to stay at Hasegawa’s boarding house and left. That night (around 1:50 a.m. on the following day, 10th), a freight train collided with their taxi at a railroad crossing. Watanabe was killed and Hasegawa was injured but survived. Tanizaki published his eulogy for Watanabe in the April 1930 issue of New Seinen. The incident was the motivation for Tanizaki to write "The Secret History" for the magazine, and it was serialized from 1931 onwards.) Initially, it was planned to be serialized for one year, but it was interrupted at the twelfth installment because it had not been completed within the planned period. In the February 1933 issue of Shin Seinen, Tanizaki wrote of completing the work, but he ended it without writing significantly more. After some additions and revisions, it was published as a novel by Chuokoronsha in October 1935. The book included a prologue written in Chinese by “Setyo Gyofu” (“Fisherman Setyo”, Tanizaki's own pseudonym), and a footnote by the novelist Masamune Shiratori.

Set in the Sengoku (“Warring States”) period, it depicts the life of a samurai warlord or daimyo with a perverse amorous life.

== Synopsis ==
The narrator explains that the story is based on the memoirs of the nun Myōkaku, who was once in the service of the Lord of Musashi, and the lord’s former servant Dōami.

Hōshimaru, heir to the Lord of Musashi, is held hostage as a child in Oshika Castle, the seat of the neighbouring Lord Tsukuma Ikkansai. In 1549, when he is aged twelve, the castle is besieged by Yakushiji Danjō Masataka. Hōshimaru is not allowed to enter the battlefield but observes the castle’s women cleaning and dressing the severed heads of the enemy samurai who have been killed. He is excited by the smile of a beautiful girl as she dresses a man’s head which is noseless, a so-called “woman-head” whose nose had been removed in the heat of the battle as a substitute for the entire head which would be retrieved later. He wishes to repeat the excitement, and secretly enters the enemy camp so he can claim a head and bring it back to the girl and make her smile again. In the camp, he kills Lord Masataka, but is only able to claim his nose. The Yakushiji leaders abandon the siege in fear that their lord’s ignominious fate will be revealed. Hōshimaru does not get his head and remains silent.

At fifteen, Hōshimaru comes of age and takes the name Terukatsu. He is Lord Ikkansai’s page and starts to earn a reputation as a warrior. The beautiful Lady Kikyō, daughter of the slain Lord Masataka, marries Tsukuma Oribenoshō Norishige, who succeeds his father Lord Ikkansai. The purpose of the marriage is to reconcile the two families; however, Lady Kikyō wants to avenge her father’s humiliating but secret death and arranges for her husband to be attacked by bow and arrow in order to sever his nose. Two attacks narrowly fail: in the first Norishige is injured with an arrow in his upper lip, disfiguring him and severely affecting his speech; and in the second he loses an ear. Terakatsu discovers her plan, and sexually fantasises about the smile on her face if Norishige were to lose his nose.

Norishige withdraws with his wife to the inner castle. Terakatsu, now aged eighteen, discovers a secret entrance to Lady Kikyō’s rooms under her toilet. He meets her and presents her with her father’s nose. To satisfy Lady Kikyō’s desire for revenge and Terakatsu’s lust, they conspire to sever her husband’s nose. They are successful and become lovers.

Terakatsu returns to his father’s castle, separated from Lady Kikyō. Aged twenty-one, he marries the fourteen-year-old Lady Shōsetstuin. He tries to teach her and her handmaidens how to “dress the heads” and demonstrates by placing his servant Dōami so that only his head is above the floor and forcing him to impersonate a corpse. Terakatsu fantasizes about cutting off Dōami’s nose, so he looks like a “woman-head”. However, Shōsetstuin cannot satisfy Terakatsu’s weird longings or replace Lady Kikyō.

Terakatsu succeeds his father as Lord of Musashi and attacks Norishige’s castle, intending to take his possessions and his wife. Norishige and Lady Kikyō are captured and confined for life but are drawn closer now her father has been avenged. She rejects Terakatsu, who subsequently “sought out new women, one after another, with whom to share his bizarre stimulus and revolting dissipation.”

== Background ==
The Secret History of the Lord of Musashi was one of several of Tanizaki’s works in “essay-fiction” between 1930 and 1950, combining experimentation and tradition, including Mōmoku Monogatari (A Blind Man's Tale, 1931), Ashikari (The Reed Cutter, 1932), Shunkinsho (A Portrait of Shunkin, 1933), and Shōshō Shigemoto no haha (Captain Shigemoto's Mother, 1949–1950).

The narrative technique of The Secret History may have been inspired by Stendhal’s The Abbess of Castro, which Tanizaki translated into Japanese in 1928. Tanizaki had originally planned to write a long historical novel and expressed a desire to include a portrayal of a real individual woman rather than one of the anonymous figures in traditional literature.

In 1948 Tanizaki wrote that The Secret History of the Lord of Musashi was one of his favorite works. He spoke of writing a sequel, and an outline for it was found after his death.

== Evaluation ==
The Secret History both supplements traditional Japanese histories and burlesques them, by outrageous exaggeration and by never questioning the veracity of the preposterous events uncovered.

In his commentary in the Chūkō bunko edition, Shoichi Saeki compares the narrative of this work with that of Alfred Hitchcock.

== Bibliography ==
- Chambers, Anthony H. (1985), "Introduction", Some Prefer Nettles / The Secret History of the Lord of Musashi / Arrowroot (Jun'ichirō Tanizaki), translated by Chambers, Anthony H., London: Picador / Pan Books, pp. 139–142, ISBN 978-0330-28825-5
- Kasahara, Nobuo, ed. (January 1985), 新潮日本文学アルバム7 谷崎潤一郎 (Shinchō Nihon bungaku arubamu 7 Tanizaki Jun'ichirō (Shincho Japanese Literature Album 7 Jun'ichirō Tanizaki)) (in Japanese), Shinchosha, ISBN 978-4-10-620607-8
- Mook, Yume (February 2015), 文藝別冊 谷崎潤一郎――没後五十年、文学の奇蹟 (Bungei bessatsu Tanizaki Jun'ichirō - botsugo go jū-nen, bungaku no kiseki (Bungei magazine: Jun'ichirō Tanizaki - A Literary Miracle, 50 Years After His Death)) (in Japanese), Kawade Shobō Shinsha, ISBN 978-4309978550
- Saeki, Shoichi (1984), "Commentary", 中公文庫『武州公秘話・聞書抄 (Kaisetsu' saeki shōichi: Chūkō bunko “Bushū kō hiwa kikigaki” (Secret Stories of Prince Busho)) (in Japanese), ISBN 978-4-12-201136-6
- Tanizaki, Jun’ichirō (10 February 2016a), 谷崎潤一郎全集 (Tanizaki Jun'ichirō zenshū (The Complete Works of Jun'ichirō Tanizaki)) (in Japanese), vol. 15, Chuokoron Shinsha, ISBN 978-4-12-403575-9
- Tanizaki, Jun’ichirō (10 August 2016b), 谷崎潤一郎全集 (Tanizaki Jun'ichirō zenshū (The Complete Works of Jun'ichirō Tanizaki)) (in Japanese), vol. 16, Chuokoron Shinsha, ISBN 978-4-12-403576-6
