= Jun'ichirō Tanizaki =

Japanese author (1886–1965)

Tanizaki Jun'ichirō
- 谷崎 潤一郎
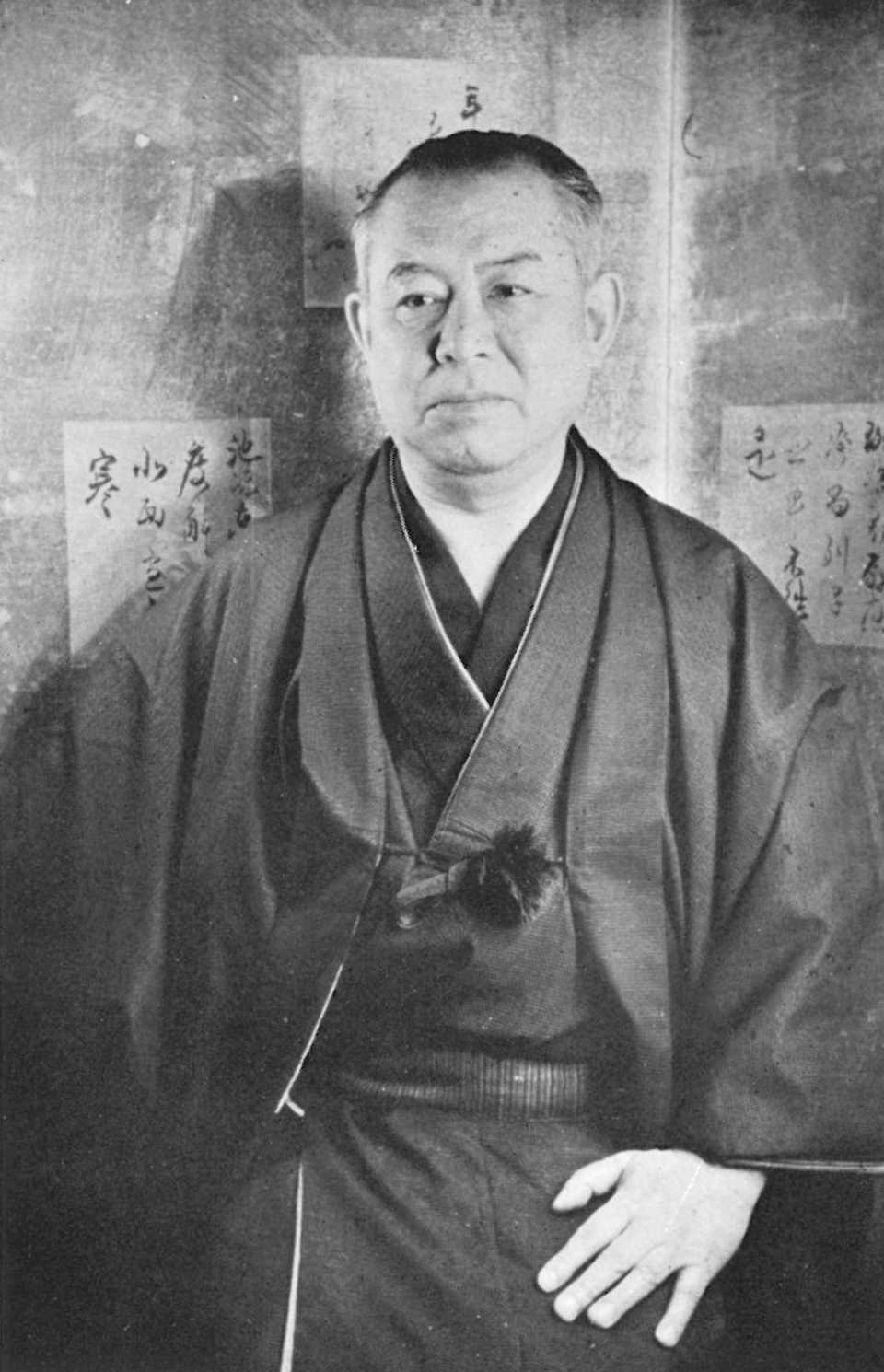
- Tanizaki in 1951
- Born: 24 July 1886; Nihonbashi, Tokyo, Empire of Japan
- Died: 30 July 1965 (aged 79); Yugawara, Kanagawa, Japan
- Occupation: Writer
- Spouses: Chiyo Ishikawa (m. 1915–1930); Sueko Furukawa (m. 1931–1934); Matsuko Morita (m. 1935)
- Children: 2
- Writing career
- Genres: Fiction, drama, essays, silent film scenarios

Jun'ichirō Tanizaki (谷崎 潤一郎, Tanizaki Jun'ichirō; 24 July 1886 – 30 July 1965) was a Japanese author who is considered to be one of the most prominent figures in modern Japanese literature. The tone and subject matter of his work range from shocking depictions of sexuality and destructive erotic obsessions to subtle portrayals of the dynamics of family life within the context of the rapid changes in 20th-century Japanese society. Frequently, his stories are narrated in the context of a search for cultural identity in which the West and Japanese tradition are juxtaposed.

He was one of six authors on the final shortlist for the Nobel Prize in Literature in 1964, the year before his death.

== Biography ==
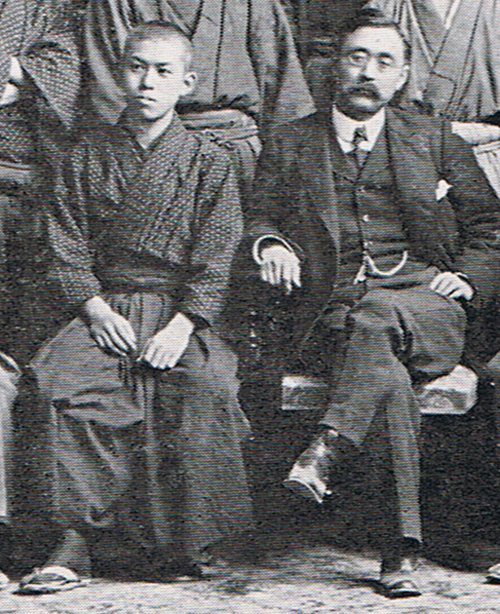
Tanizaki (left) as a student at the First Higher School, and its Head Master Nitobe Inazō (right), in 1908.

=== Early life ===
Tanizaki was born into a well-to-do merchant-class family in Nihonbashi, Tokyo, where his uncle owned a printing press, which had been established by his grandfather. His parents were Kuragorō and Seki Tanizaki. His older brother, Kumakichi, died three days after his birth, which made him the next eldest son of the family. Tanizaki had three younger brothers: Tokuzō, Seiji (also a writer) and Shūhei, as well three younger sisters: Sono, Ise and Sue. Tanizaki described his admittedly pampered childhood in his Yōshō Jidai (Childhood Years, 1956). His childhood home was destroyed in the 1894 Meiji Tokyo earthquake, to which Tanizaki later attributed his lifelong fear of earthquakes. His family's finances declined dramatically as he grew older until he was forced to reside in another household as a tutor.

Despite these financial problems, he attended the Tokyo First Middle School, where he became acquainted with Isamu Yoshii. Tanizaki attended the Literature Department of Tokyo Imperial University from 1908, but was forced to drop out in 1911 because of his inability to pay for tuition.

== Early literary career ==
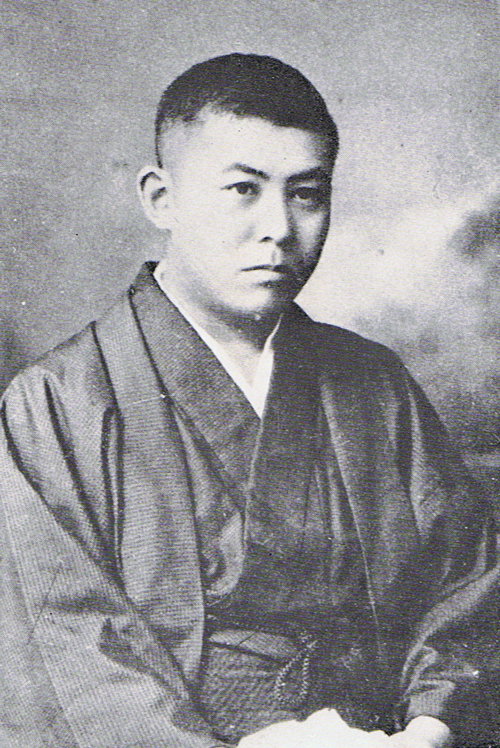
Tanizaki in 1913, shortly after his literary debut.

Tanizaki began his literary career in 1909. His first work, a one-act stage play, was published in a literary magazine that he had helped found. Tanizaki's name first became widely known with the publication of the short story Shisei (The Tattooer, 1910). In the story, a tattoo artist inscribes a giant spider on the body of a beautiful young woman. Afterwards, the woman's beauty takes on a demonic, compelling power, in which eroticism is combined with sado-masochism. The femme-fatale is a theme repeated in many of Tanizaki's early works, including Kirin (1910), Shonen (The Children, 1911), Himitsu (The Secret, 1911), and Akuma (Devil, 1912). Tanizaki's other works published in the Taishō period include Shindo (1916) and Oni no men (1916), which are partly autobiographical.

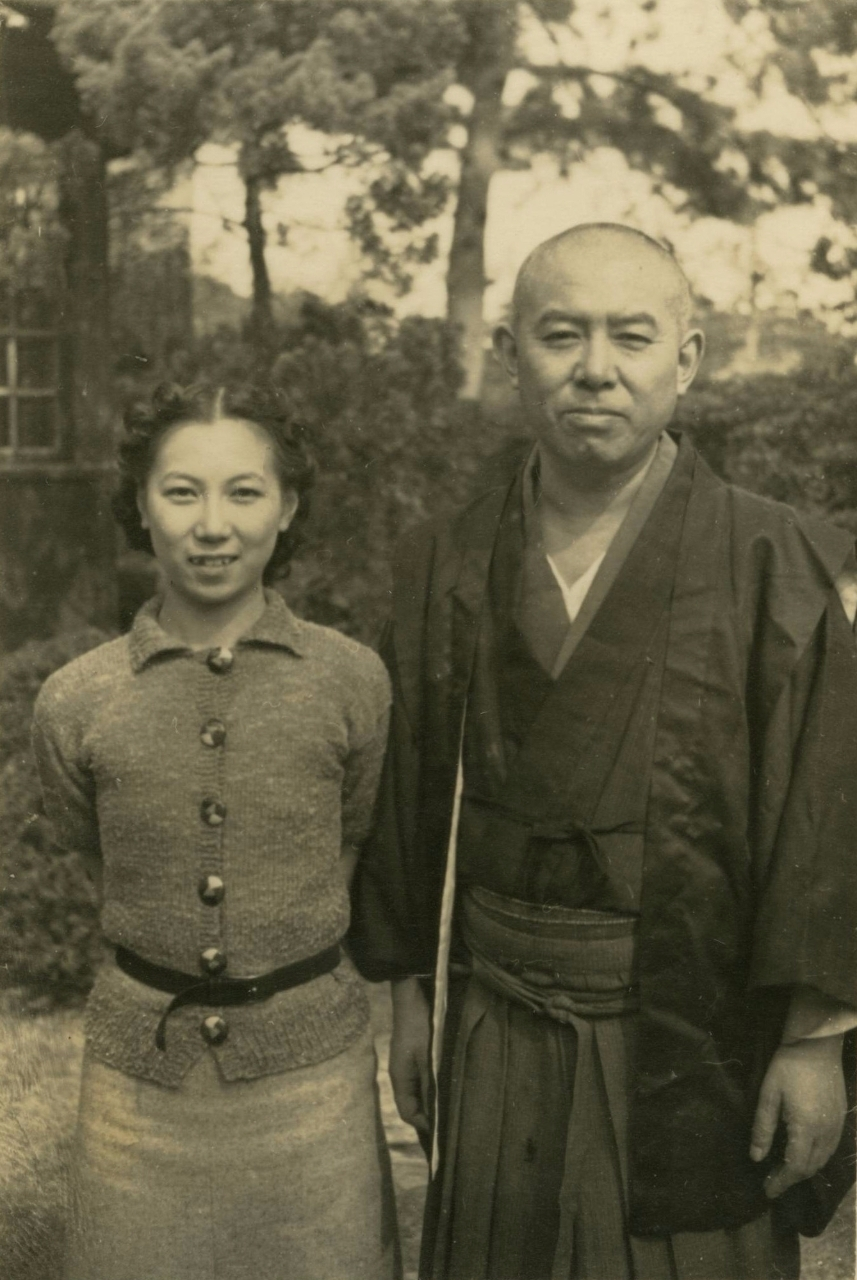
Tanizaki with his daughter Ayuko, 1938.

Tanizaki married his first wife, Chiyo Ishikawa, in 1915, and his only child, Ayuko, was born in 1916. However, it was an unhappy marriage, and in time he encouraged a relationship between Chiyo and his friend and fellow writer Haruo Satō. The psychological stress of this situation is reflected in some of his early works, including the stage play Aisureba koso (Because I Love Her, 1921) and the novel Kami to hito no aida (Between Men and the Gods, 1924). Even though some of Tanizaki's writings seem to have been inspired by these and other persons and events in his life, his works are far less autobiographical than those of most of his contemporaries in Japan. Tanizaki later adopted Emiko, the daughter of his third wife, Matsuko Morita.

In 1918, Tanizaki toured Chōsen, northern China, and Manchuria. In his early years he became infatuated with the West and all things modern. In 1922, he relocated from Odawara, where he had been living since 1919, to Yokohama, which had a large expatriate population, living briefly in a Western-style house and leading a bohemian lifestyle. This outlook is reflected in some of his early writings.

Tanizaki had a brief career in silent cinema, working as a script writer for the Taikatsu film studio. He was a supporter of the Pure Film Movement and was instrumental in bringing modernist themes to Japanese film. He wrote the scripts for the films Amateur Club (1922) and A Serpent's Lust (1923) (based on the story of the same title by Ueda Akinari, which was, in part, the inspiration for Mizoguchi Kenji's 1953 masterpiece Ugetsu monogatari). Some have argued that Tanizaki's relation to cinema is important to understanding his overall career.

== Period in Kyoto ==
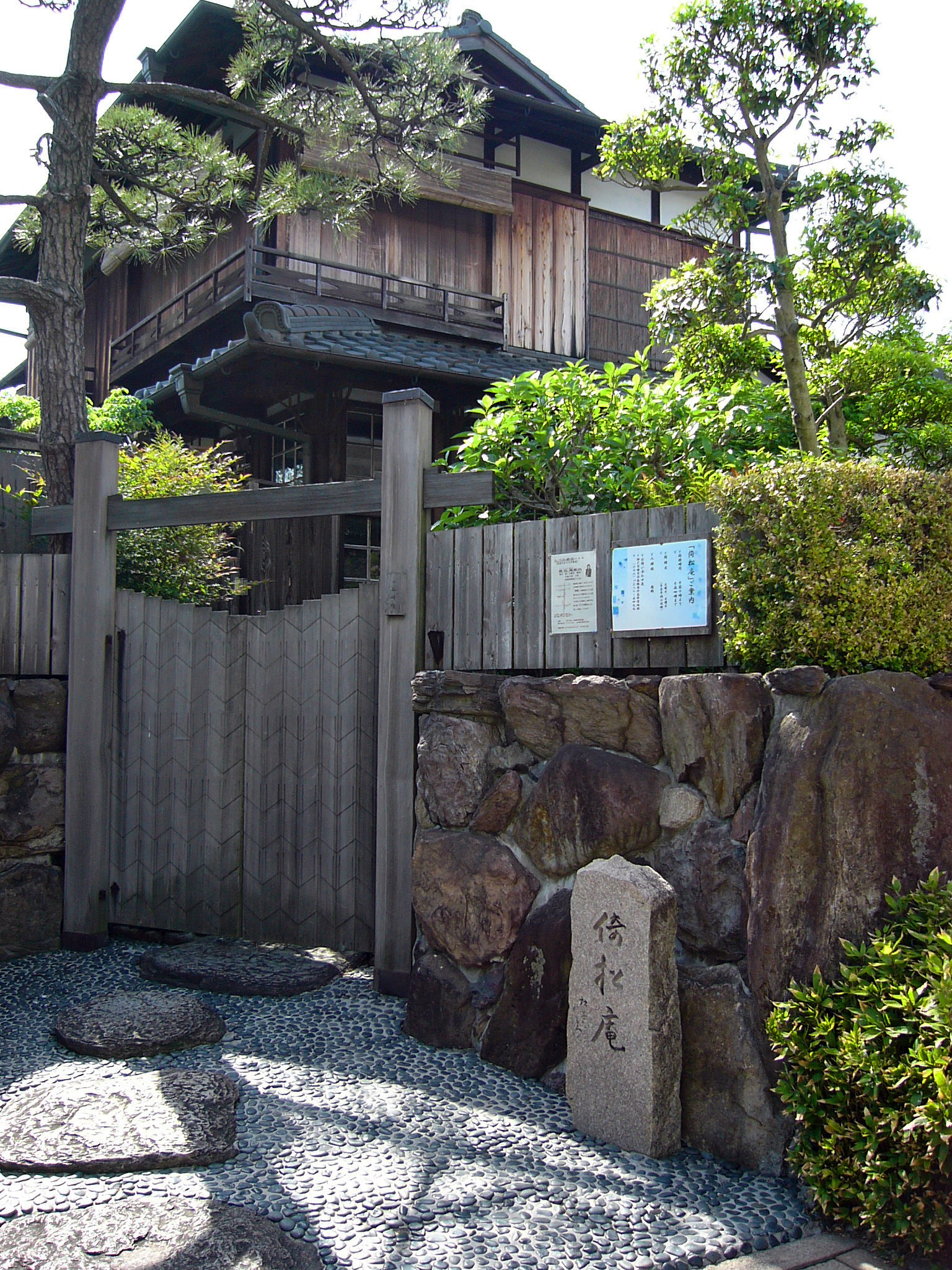
Tanizaki's old residence "Ishōan" in Kobe, where he wrote the earlier part of Sasameyuki in 1943.

Tanizaki's reputation began to take off in 1923, when he moved to Kyoto after the Great Kanto earthquake, which destroyed his house in Yokohama (at the time Tanizaki was on a bus in Hakone and thus escaped injury). The loss of Tokyo's historic buildings and neighborhoods in the quake triggered a change in his enthusiasms, as he redirected his youthful love for the imagined West and modernity into a renewed interest in Japanese aesthetics and culture, particularly the culture of the Kansai region (around the cities of Osaka, Kobe and Kyoto). His first novel after the earthquake, and his first truly successful novel, was Chijin no ai (Naomi, 1924–25), which is a tragicomic exploration of class, sexual obsession, and cultural identity. Tanizaki made another trip to China in 1926, where he met Guo Moruo, with whom he later maintained correspondence. He relocated from Kyoto to Kobe in 1928.

Inspired by the Osaka dialect, Tanizaki wrote Manji (Quicksand, 1928–1929), in which he explored lesbianism, among other themes. This was followed by the classic Tade kuu mushi (Some Prefer Nettles, 1928–29), which depicts the gradual self-discovery of a Tokyo man living near Osaka, in relation to Western-influenced modernization and Japanese tradition. Yoshino kuzu (Arrowroot, 1931) alludes to Bunraku and kabuki theater and other traditional forms even as it adapts a European narrative-within-a-narrative technique. His experimentation with narrative styles continued with Ashikari (The Reed Cutter, 1932), Shunkinshō (A Portrait of Shunkin, 1933), and many other works that combine traditional aesthetics with Tanizaki's particular obsessions.

His renewed interest in classical Japanese literature culminated in his multiple translations into modern Japanese of the eleventh-century classic The Tale of Genji and in his masterpiece Sasameyuki (literally "A Light Snowfall," but published in English translation as The Makioka Sisters, 1943–1948), a detailed characterization of four daughters of a wealthy Osaka merchant family who see their way of life slipping away in the early years of World War II. The sisters live a cosmopolitan life with European neighbors and friends, without suffering the cultural-identity crises common to earlier Tanizaki characters. When he began to serialize the novel, the editors of the literary magazine Chūō Kōron were warned that it did not contribute to the needed war spirit and, fearful of losing supplies of paper, cut off the serialization.

Tanizaki relocated to the resort town of Atami, Shizuoka in 1942, but returned to Kyoto in 1946.

Tanizaki's handwritten tanka poem of 1963. "This heart of mine is only one, it cannot be known by anybody but myself."

== Post-war period ==
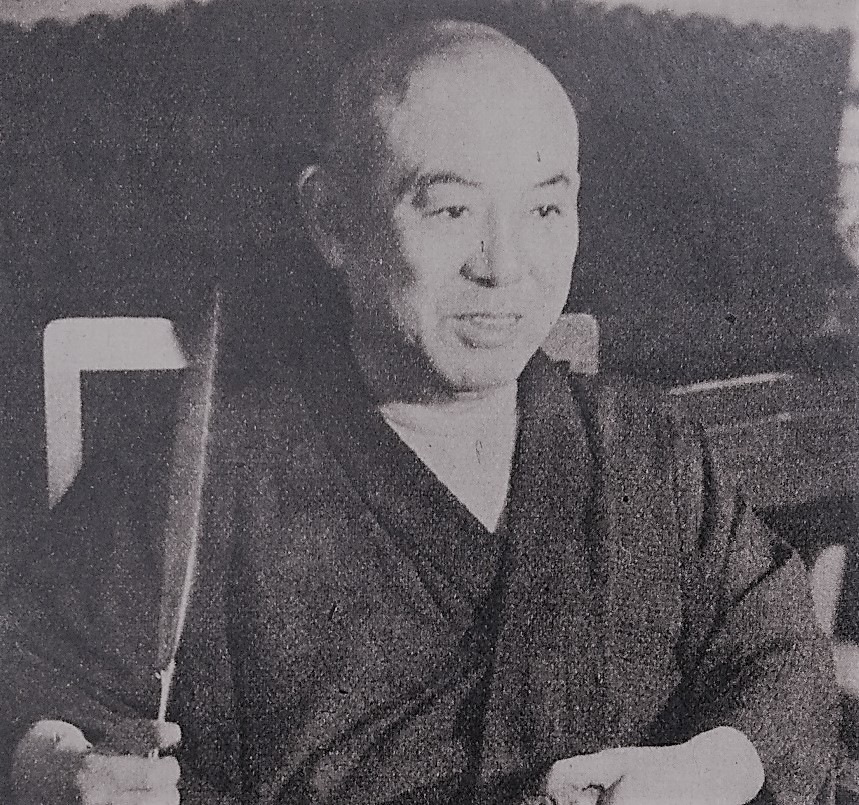
Tanizaki in 1948.

After World War II, Tanizaki again emerged into literary prominence, winning a host of awards. Until his death, he was widely regarded as Japan's greatest contemporary author. He won the prestigious Asahi Prize in 1948, was awarded the Order of Culture by the Japanese government in 1949, and in 1964 was elected to honorary membership in the American Academy and Institute of Arts and Letters, the first Japanese writer to be so honoured.

His first major post-war work was Shōshō Shigemoto no haha (Captain Shigemoto's Mother, 1949–1950), which includes a restatement of Tanizaki's frequent theme of a son's longing for his mother. The novel also introduces a new theme, of sexuality in old age, which reappears in later works such as Kagi (The Key, 1956). Kagi is a psychological novel in which an aging professor arranges for his wife to commit adultery in order to boost his own sagging sexual desires.

Tanizaki returned to Atami in 1950, and was designated a Person of Cultural Merit by the Japanese government in 1952. He suffered from paralysis of the right hand from 1958, and was hospitalized for Angina pectoris in 1960. Tanizaki's characters are often driven by obsessive erotic desires. In one of his last novels, Futen Rojin Nikki (Diary of a Mad Old Man, 1961–1962), the aged diarist is struck down by a stroke brought on by an excess of sexual excitement. He records both his past desires and his current efforts to bribe his daughter-in-law to provide sexual titillation in return for Western baubles. In 1964, Tanizaki moved to Yugawara, Kanagawa, southwest of Tokyo, where he died of a heart attack on 30 July 1965, shortly after celebrating his 79th birthday. His grave is at the temple Hōnen-in, in Kyoto.

== Legacy ==
The Tanizaki Prize is one of Japan's most sought-after literary awards. Established in 1965 by the publishing company Chūō Kōronsha, it is awarded annually to a work of fiction or drama.

Before Haruki Murakami had achieved wide renown, Tanizaki was frequently considered one of the "Big Three" postwar Japanese writers along with Yasunari Kawabata and Yukio Mishima.

== Bibliography ==
=== Selected works ===
Year	Japanese Title	English Title	English Translator	Notes
1910	刺青; Shisei	"The Tattooer"	Howard Hibbett	
1913	恐怖; Kyōfu	"Terror"	Howard Hibbett	A short story of a young man suffering of the fear of trains
1918	白昼鬼語; Hakuchū Kigo	Devils in Daylight	J. Keith Vincent	
1918	金と銀; Kin to Gin	"Gold and Silver"		
1919	富美子の足; Fumiko no ashi	"Fumiko's Feet"		
1921	私 Watakushi	"The Thief"	Howard Hibbett	
1922	青い花; Aoi hana	"Aguri"	Howard Hibbett	
1925	痴人の愛; Chijin no ai	Naomi	Anthony Chambers	a.k.a. A Fool's Love
1926	友田と松永の話; Tomoda to Matsunaga no hanashi	"The Strange Case of Tomoda and Matsunaga"	Paul McCarthy	
1926	青塚氏の話; Aozukashi no hanashi	"Mr. Bluemound"	Paul McCarthy	
1928	黒白; Kokubyaku	In Black and White	Phyllis I. Lyons	
1928– 1930	卍 Manji	Quicksand	Howard Hibbett	Film adaptation (remakes: 1983, 1998, 2006, 2023)
1929	蓼喰う蟲; Tade kuu mushi	Some Prefer Nettles	Edward Seidensticker	
1931	吉野葛; Yoshino kuzu	Arrowroot	Anthony Chambers	
1932	蘆刈; Ashikari	The Reed Cutter	Anthony Chambers	Film adaptation
1933	春琴抄; Shunkinshō	"A Portrait of Shunkin"	Howard Hibbett	Film adaptation Opera adaptation
1933	陰翳礼讃; In'ei raisan	In Praise of Shadows	Edward Seidensticker and Thomas J. Harper (1977); Gregory Starr (2017); Michael P. Cronin (2026)	Essay on aesthetics
1935	武州公秘話; Bushukō hiwa	The Secret History of the Lord of Musashi	Anthony Chambers	
1936	猫と庄造と二人の女; Neko to Shōzō to futari no onna	A Cat, A Man, and Two Women	Paul McCarthy	Film adaptation
1943– 1948	細雪; Sasameyuki	The Makioka Sisters	Edward Seidensticker	Film adaptation
1949	少将滋幹の母; Shōshō Shigemoto no haha	Captain Shigemoto's Mother	Anthony Chambers	
1956	鍵 Kagi	The Key	Howard Hibbett	Film adaptation
1957	幼少時代; Yōshō jidai	Childhood Years: A Memoir	Paul McCarthy	
1961	瘋癲老人日記; Fūten rōjin nikki	Diary of a Mad Old Man	Howard Hibbett	Film adaptation
1962–3	台所太平記 Daidokoro taiheiki	The Maids	Michael P. Cronin	

=== Works published in English ===
- Some Prefer Nettles, tr. Edward Seidensticker, Alfred A. Knopf 1955, Vintage Press 1995. ISBN 0-679-75269-2
- The Makioka Sisters, tr. Edward Seidensticker, Alfred A. Knopf 1957, Vintage Press 1995. ISBN 0-679-76164-0
- The Key and Diary of a Mad Old Man, tr. Howard Hibbert, Alfred A. Knopf 1960 and 1965 respectively, reissued in a single volume by Vintage Press 2004. ISBN 1-4000-7900-4
- Seven Japanese Tales, tr. Howard Hibbett, Alfred A. Knopf 1963. ISBN 0-679-76107-1 Includes "A Portrait of Shunkin," "Terror," "The Bridge of Dreams," "The Tattooer," "The Thief," "Aguri," and "A Blind Man's Tale."
- In Praise of Shadows, tr. Thomas J. Harper and Edward G. Seidensticker, Leete's Island Books 1977, Charles E. Tuttle 1984.
- Naomi, tr. Anthony H. Chambers, Alfred A. Knopf 1985, Vintage Press 2001. ISBN 0-375-72474-5
- Childhood Years: A Memoir, tr. Paul McCarthy, Kodansha International 1988. ISBN 0-00-654450-9. Reissued by the University of Michigan Press, 2017.
- A Cat, a Man, and Two Women, tr. Paul McCarthy, Kodansha International 1990. ISBN 4-7700-1605-0 Reissued by New Directions, 2016. Also includes "The Little Kingdom" and "Professor Rado."
- The Secret History of the Lord of Musashi and Arrowroot, tr. Anthony H. Chambers, Alfred A. Knopf 1982, Vintage Press 2003. ISBN 0-375-71931-8
- Quicksand, tr. Howard Hibbett, Alfred A. Knopf 1993, Vintage Press 1995. ISBN 0-679-76022-9
- The Reed Cutter and Captain Shigemoto's Mother, tr. Anthony H. Chambers, Alfred A. Knopf 1993.
- Memoir of Forgetting the Capital: Miyakowasure no ki, tr. by Amy V. Heinrich, Foreword by Donald Keene, Yushodo/Columbia University Press, 2010.
- The Gourmet Club: A Sextet, tr. Anthony H. Chambers and Paul McCarthy, Kodansha International 2001. ISBN 4-7700-2972-1. Reissued by the University of Michigan Press, 2017. Includes "The Children," "The Secret," "The Two Acolytes," "The Gourmet Club," "Mr. Bluemound," and "Manganese Dioxide Dreams."
- Red Roofs and Other Stories, tr. Anthony H. Chambers and Paul McCarthy, University of Michigan Press, 2016. Includes "The Strange Case of Tomoda and Matsunaga," "A Night in Qinhuai," "The Magician," and "Red Roofs."
- Devils in Daylight, tr. by J. Keith Vincent, New Directions, 2017.
- The Maids. tr. by Michael P. Cronin, New Directions, 2017
- "The Jester." tr. by Howard Hibbett. In A Tokyo Anthology: Literature from Japan’s Modern Metropolis, 1850–1915, ed. by Sumie Jones and Charles S. Inouye, pp. 268–280. University of Hawai’i Press, 2017.
- In Black and White, tr. by Phyllis I. Lyons, Columbia University Press (2018).
- Longing and Other Stories, tr. Anthony H. Chambers and Paul McCarthy, Columbia University Press 2022. Includes "Longing," "Sorrows of a Heretic," and "The Story of an Unhappy Mother."
- The Siren's Lament: Essential Stories, tr. Bryan Karetnyk, Pushkin Press, 2023. Collects three stories: "The Qilin", "Killing O-Tsuya", and, "The Siren's Lament". ISBN 9-781-78227809-2
- The Tattoo and Other Stories, tr. Anthony H. Chambers, Paul McCarthy, and J. Keith Vincent. Tuttle Publishing, 2026. Eight stories: "The Tattoo," "The Two Acolytes," "RedRoofs," "A Lock of Hair," "Mr. Bluemound," "Japan's Own 'Dr. Crippen,'" "From the Life of Shunkin," and "A Record of Cruelty." ISBN 978-4-8053-1959-8
- In Praise of Shadows and Other Essays, tr. Michael P. Cronin, photos by John Einarsen. "Hanshin Observations," "At Okamoto," "Osaka and Osaka's as I See Them," and "In Praise of Shadows." Tuttle Publishing, 2026. ISBN 978-4-8053-1935-2

== Adaptations ==
Tanizaki's works have repeatedly been adapted into films, including:

- Miss Oyu (1951), based on the novella The Reed Cutter
- Torawakamaru the Koga Ninja (1957)
- Odd Obsession (1959), based on the 1956 novel The Key
- Manji (1964)
- Akuto (1965), based on the play Kaoyo
- Sanka (1972), based on the story Shunkinshō
- The Makioka Sisters (1983)
- The Key (1983)
- Diary of a Mad Old Man (1987)
- The Key (2014)
- Diary of a Mad Old Man (2026)

== See also ==
- The Moon in the Water: Understanding Tanizaki, Kawabata, and Mishima
