= Greg Starr =

American actor

Gregory Starr
- Born: Tennessee, United States
- Occupations: Writer; Translator; Voice Actor; Editor
- Years active: 1970–present

Gregory "Greg" Starr is a Tokyo-based writer, translator and editor who occasionally did voice work for Frontier Enterprises until its closure in 2000.

== Biography ==
In 1970, Starr left Tennessee to study at the Sophia University in Tokyo, Japan. To pay for the tuition, he drove meat delivery trucks, wrote lyrics for bands and would lend his voice to English-dubbed versions of Shochiku's Tora-San films.

Starr is currently still working as a translator in Japan and has occasionally written articles for CNN Travel. He currently lives in Akiya, a village on the coast southwest of Tokyo.

== Filmography ==
=== Anime Films ===
- Lupin the 3rd: The Mystery of Mamo (1978) - Detective Ed Scott, Flinch, Dietman (Frontier Dub)
- Swan Lake (1981) - Adolph (Frontier Dub)
- Aladdin & the Wonderful Lamp (1982) - Additional Voices (Frontier Dub)
- The Dagger of Kamui (1985) - Oguri, Sanpei
