= Leaf Storm =

1955 novella by Gabriel García Márquez

- First edition (Colombia)
- Author: Gabriel García Márquez
- Original title: La Hojarasca
- Language: Spanish
- Publisher: Ediciones SLB (Colombia); Harper & Row (US)
- Publication date: 1955
- Publication place: Colombia
- English publication date: 1972
- Media type: Print (Hardback & Paperback)
- ISBN: 978-0-14-103256-6

Leaf Storm is the common translation for Gabriel García Márquez's novella La Hojarasca (lit. 'Litter'). First published in 1955, it took seven years to find a publisher. Widely celebrated as the first appearance of Macondo, the fictitious village later made famous in One Hundred Years of Solitude, Leaf Storm is a testing ground for many of the themes and characters later immortalized in said book. It is also the title of a short story collection by García Márquez.

The other stories compiled in the English translation are “The Handsomest Drowned Man in the World”, “A Very Old Man with Enormous Wings”, “Blacaman the Good, Vendor of Miracles”, “The Last Voyage of the Ghost Ship”, “The Monologue of Isabel Watching It Rain in Macondo”, and “Nabo”. Several of these short stories appeared elsewhere before being put into this compilation. “The Handsomest Drowned Man in the World” first appeared in Playboy magazine in 1971. “A Very Old Man with Enormous Wings” first appeared in New American Review and “Blacaman the Good, Vendor of Miracles” was first published in Esquire Magazine.

The narrative of Leaf Storm shifts between the perspectives of three generations of one family as the three characters (father, daughter and grandson respectively) find themselves in a spiritual limbo after the death of a man passionately hated by the entire village yet inextricably linked to the patriarch of the family.

== Plot introduction ==
The novella takes place in Macondo, the fictional town that would be the future site of more García Márquez stories. At this point in time, the banana company has landed in the little town of Macondo and, with it, many new people to work. The newcomers are referred to as “la hojarasca,” hence the title of the book. However, the narrative surrounds a colonel, his daughter Isabel, his grandson and the burial of a doctor scorned by the village. The story takes place at the wake of the doctor.

== Plot summary ==
The Father, an aging, half blind man who carries the title of colonel within the village, has made a promise to bury the recently deceased former doctor in spite of the consensus within Macondo that he should be left to rot within the corner house where he had lived in complete social isolation for the past decade. The daughter, Isabel, is obliged to accompany her father out of respect for traditional values while knowing she and her son will be doomed to face the wrath of her neighbors in Macondo. The narrative of the grandson, on the other hand, is more preoccupied with the mystery and wonder of death.

As with many of his stories, such as Love in the Time of Cholera and Chronicle of a Death Foretold, García Márquez introduces a dramatic scene to begin his narrative and then moves backward, rehashing the past that will lead up to the ultimate conclusion. It is discovered within the narrative that the center of all the conflict (the deceased) is a doctor who came to Macondo with a mysterious past and no clear name. The man's only saving grace is a letter of recommendation from the Colonel Aureliano Buendia, one of the main characters of the later One Hundred Years of Solitude. It is this letter that leads the stranger to the family that serves collectively as narrator to the drama that unfolds.

== List of characters ==
- Colonel - Old Colombian Civil War veteran in Macondo. First-person narrator. His unnamed wife died long ago (1898), soon after giving birth to his only child, Isabel.
- Isabel (Chabela) - Colonel's 30-year-old daughter. First-person narrator.
- Child - 10-year-old son of Isabel and Martín. First-person narrator.
- Adelaida - Colonel's second wife, stepmother of Isabel.
- Doctor - Physician, living at the colonel's house.
- Remedios Orozco (Meme) - Adelaida's indian maid, Doctor's concubine. Last seen in 1917.
- Martín - Isabel's husband, profession unknown. Last seen in 1920.
- Pup, father Ángel - Parish priests in distinct generations.
- Rebeca, Águeda, Veva García, Solita - Friends of Isabel.
- Tobías, Abraham, Gilberto - School friends of the child.
- Lucrecia - Naked young woman in her bedroom, object of interest of the child and his friends.
- Ada - Adelaida's maid in 1928.
- Cataure - One of the colonel's guajiros (indians under his orders).
- Macondo's mayor
- A woman and her child - Both unnamed, used to live at the church room, back in the early 1900s.

=== Narrative Techniques ===
In medias res
Marquez starts his novella in medias res, that is, “in the middle of things”. This is shown through the opening paragraph that starts off with the description of the banana company landing in Macondo and then immediately goes to the boy’s point of view at the doctor’s wake.

Multiple narrators
The story changes narrators at many points with an omniscient narrator always being present. It changes from the boy to his mother to his grandfather the colonel. Each perspective is different and allows the reader to see inside the mind of whoever is speaking.

Stream of consciousness
The story is told in a stream of consciousness because the boy, Isabel, and the colonel tell the reader a trail of thoughts as they appear in their mind. These internal monologues provide the information that puts the pieces of the story together as the story starts off at the doctor’s death and not his life. Because the stream of consciousness is used, it enables the characters to jump back and forth in time without ever leaving their present moment, which is at the wake of the doctor. Also, due to this narrative technique, the illusion is given that these characters are talking aloud to each other when, in fact, very little interaction actually takes place between them.

=== Themes ===
Death
As the novella starts out at the wake of the doctor, death is an apparent theme that surrounds the narrative. More specifically, however, the type of death exhibited in this book is self-inflicted death as the doctor committed suicide after locking himself away for ten years in his home.

Solitude
Solitude is another important theme that not only manifests itself through the doctor’s life but through the colonel, Isabel, and the boy. As a result of the doctor’s isolation he commits suicide but as a result of that suicide the family risks isolation with his burial. Because the doctor was an outcast from Macondo and scorned by the people of Macondo there is more at stake than just the proper treatment of a corpse. This is reflected in Isabel’s thoughts as she contemplates how the townspeople will receive them after they bury the doctor.

War
It is not as apparent as solitude or death but nonetheless involved in the story. It is suggested in the novella that at this time in Macondo’s history a civil war has ended. This can be inferred by the reason that townspeople hate the doctor. He denied treatment to wounded soldiers that had come to his house to seek aid. The colonel himself is a reminder of war culture as he maintains high rank in Macondo and is well respected by the people although he is going against their will by burying the doctor. Also, reflecting war culture is the colonel’s relationship to the doctor. He is loyal to the doctor even after his death because of the doctor's ties to another colonel he knows.

=== The deceased ===
After giving up on the practice of medicine and living at the expense of the family for an inordinate amount of time, the reclusive doctor moves two houses down with Meme, the indigenous house maid that had been living with the narrative family at the time. While his reclusive demeanour and lustful attention to the female form do not make him popular with the locals, the former doctor's ultimate banishment only occurs when nearly a dozen men, wounded from one of the country's many civil wars, are brought to his door in search of medical attention. The doctor, having given up the practice of medicine, refuses to save them as he once refused to help an ailing Meme while they had been living with the family of narrators.

=== Traces of magical realism ===
In addition to the themes of cyclicality and inversion that are bedrocks to the narrative fluidity of One Hundred Years of Solitude; Leaf Storm also demonstrates several other techniques identified with Magical Realism such as manipulation of time and the use of multiple perspectives.
