= Until August =

2024 novel by Gabriel García Márquez

- Author: Gabriel García Márquez
- Original title: En agosto nos vemos
- Translator: Anne McLean
- Language: Spanish
- Publisher: Random House
- Publication date: 6 March 2024
- Publication place: Colombia
- Pages: 150

Until August (Spanish: En agosto nos vemos, lit. 'See you in August') is a novel by Colombian author Gabriel García Márquez published posthumously in March 2024. It was released on the 97th anniversary of his birth, 6 March. The only Marquez novel with a female protagonist, the stories within feature a woman's annual August trips to an island where her mother is buried, and where she meets new lovers.

== Background ==
Until August was originally planned to be a collection of four stories. García Márquez had worked on the novel at least since 1997. In September of that year he read portions of Until August out loud at Georgetown University. However, he put aside work on the novel to work on Memories of My Melancholy Whores. In 2004, he commented that he felt satisfied with the development of the protagonist, but did not feel satisfied with the version of the novel he had written. He never completed the novel. Towards the end of his life, he began to suffer from dementia. Due to his memory issues, he could no longer follow the plot of the novel, and therefore could not complete it. The manuscript of the novel was placed in an archive at Ransom Center after García Márquez's death. Originally, his family decided not to publish the incomplete novel. However, in 2022, his sons (Note: García Márquez and his wife, Mercedes Barcha, had two sons: Rodrigo and Gonzalo García Barcha.) re-read the drafts of the novel, of which there were five. Although García Márquez had requested that his sons ensure the destruction of the novel, they found literary worth in the novel, and chose to edit and release it, stating "We did think about it for about three seconds - was it a betrayal to my parents, to my father's [wishes]? And we decided, yes, it was a betrayal. But that's what children are for". The publication of Until August was announced in April 2023. According to his sons, this will be the final García Márquez work published, as there is nothing else left in his archive. The choice of his sons to publish the novel against the wishes of their father was met with criticism.

== Summary ==
Ana Magdalena Bach lives happily with her husband of 27 years. Despite this, she takes a ferry every August to the island where her mother is buried, and every August takes a new lover.

It is the first and only novel by García Márquez to be centered on a female protagonist.

== Reception ==
The publication of a posthumous novel by García Márquez was met with great anticipation. Over 250 thousand copies were preordered in Latin America, and in Colombia, the book was the third most sold novel by bookseller Librería Nacional in the week before its release. The Torre Colpatria in Bogotá lit up to commemorate the publication of the novel.

The novel received mixed reviews. A negative review for the New York Times called Until August an "unsatisfying goodbye". Lucy Hughes-Hallett gave a negative review of the novel for The Guardian, criticizing the prose style, structure, and inconsistencies; conversely, Anthony Cummins, also writing for The Guardian, called the novel "better than [García Márquez] had feared". A review for El País wrote that the novel "had virtues", but that it could not live up to García Márquez's best work.
