= Theatre Formation Paribartak =

Group theatre in West Bengal, India

- থিয়েটার ফর্মেশন পরিবর্তক
- Formation: 2001
- Legal status: Registered under the West Bengal Societies Registration Act, 1961
- Headquarters: Howrah
- Location: West Bengal, India
- Official language: Bengali, English, Hindi
- Website: http://tfp.paribartak.org

Theatre Formation Paribartak is a group theatre situated in the Howrah district of West Bengal, India. It produces short theatres, one-act plays and full-length plays in Bengali, English and Hindi. Its performances are held in prosceniums, intimate spaces, streets and in virtual platforms. It also organizes workshops for its own actors. Before May 2005, it was a unit of another organization that now goes under the name of Changers' Foundation Paribartak.

== Plays ==
=== List of plays ===
The group produces mainly one-act Bengali plays. Its productions include:

- Waiting For Godot (inspired by Samuel Beckett's play Waiting For Godot)
- Ekdin Rattire (একদিন রাত্তিরে), means One Day in The Night
- Fasad (ফসাদ), means The Problem (Hindi-Bengali bilingual)
- Kaman (কামান), means The Cannon
- Godot Waits For Homeland Security (produced in English, written by Martin Kimeldorf, later replaced by Anusaran, the Bengali adaptation)
- Piano, after a story by Anibal Machado
- Pedro Páramo, after the novel by Juan Rulfo
- Danawala Ekta Buro (ডানাওয়ালা একটা বুড়ো), means An Old Man with Wings, after a story by Gabriel García Marquez
- Stalingrad 1942
- Endgame (inspired by Samuel Beckett's play Endgame)
- Anusaran (অনুসরণ), means Following, inspired by Godot Waits For Homeland Security written by Martin Kimeldorf
- Dhundhumar (ধুন্ধুমার), means The Hullabaloo
- Rabindra Panchak (রবীন্দ্র পঞ্চক, a collection of five skits written by Rabindranath Tagore)
- No Exit (Bengali-English bilingual play inspired by Jean-Paul Sartre's play No Exit)
- Bandarnach (বান্দরনাচ), means Monkey Dance (Hindi-Bengali-English trilingual)
- Mayabari The Grand House of Illusion (মায়াবাড়ি দ্য গ্র্যাণ্ড হাউস অফ ইলিউশন, Bengali-English bilingual play inspired by Jean Genet's play The Balcony)
- Lakshmaner Shaktishel (লক্ষ্মণের শক্তিশেল, written by Sukumar Ray; a site-specific theatre production presented in the compound of Pathuriaghata Ghoshbari, Kolkata)
- Himmatwala (হিম্মতওয়ালা), means The Courageous
- Robir Tinti Hasi (রবির তিনটি হাসি, a collection of three skits written by Rabindranath Tagore)
- Metamorphosis (inspired by the novella The Metamorphosis written by Franz Kafka, produced in English)
- Sthananko (স্থানাঙ্ক), means The Coordinates
- Ghater Katha (ঘাটের কথা, inspired by the short story of the same name written by Rabindranath Tagore), means Tale of Riverside Steps
- The Visit (inspired by the play written by Friedrich Dürrenmatt, produced in English)
- Ekti Uttar Adhunik Samajik Pala (একটি উত্তর-আধুনিক সামাজিক পালা), means A Post-Modern Social Drama
- The Reality Show, produced in Bengali
- Nainam Dahati Pavakah (নৈনং দহতি পাবকঃ), means Fire can't burn it, inspired by Ray Bradbury's novel Fahrenheit 451
- Gimpel The Fool (a transversion of the short story Gimpel the Fool written by Isaac Bashevis Singer, produced in English)
- Apocalypse (loosely inspired by the novel Khelnanagar written by Nabarun Bhattacharya, produced in English)
- Charai (চড়াই), means The Sparrow
- The Old Man and The Sea (inspired by the novella of the same name written by Ernest Hemingway, produced in English)
- Joker (based on Blowup as written by Julio Cortázar and filmed by Michelangelo Antonioni, produced in Bengali)
- Confusion (produced in Bengali, 12 minutes)
- Putul (পুতুল), means The Doll
- Love, Food, Nation a.k.a. Mutton Cutlet (produced in English)
- Jot (জট), means Tangled
- Bukhar (बुखार), means The Fever, 12 minutes
- Freedom (produced in English)
- Tick (produced in Bengali, 10 minutes)
- Tock (produced in Bengali, 10 minutes)
- Imaginarium (Text-based Virtual Reality Theatre, a WhatsApp drama, in English)
- Moyla (ময়লা), means Dirt (a virtual live theatre, in Bengali)

=== Other productions ===
Non-participative development theatres produced by Theatre Formation Paribartak include Tia (for encouraging people to donate blood to blood banks) and Roopkatha (for promotion of the Child Helpline no. 1098).

Theatre Formation Paribartak has also produced Machhi (মাছি) written by Mohit Chattopadhyay and two more street-theatres - Machine (written by Safdar Hashmi) and Jhilik (ঝিলিক) but it does not run these productions.

The theatres Lakshmaner Shaktishel, Himmatwala, Ekti Uttar Adhunik Samajik Pala, Pratahkritya and Titumir were produced by an autonomous body of freelancing actors and technicians brought together by Theatre Formation Paribartak and facilitated by Joyraj Bhattacharjee.

=== Avoiding attribution ===
In the above list, if not otherwise mentioned, plays are written by members of Theatre Formation Paribartak, whose names are not generally disclosed by the organization. They also avoid mentioning the names of their directors who are also members of the group. Unlike many other theatre groups, it not been associated exclusively with a famous theatre personality or any one person. It also prefers to avoid mentioning the names of its performers and technicians.

== Awards ==
The theatres of Theatre Formation Paribartak, since its inception in 2001, have won the following awards:

- 2003 - Waiting For Godot - 2nd Best Production - in an All Bengal One Act Bengali Drama Competition organized in Howrah
- 2005 - Danawala Ekta Buro - Best Actress: Debasri Saha in the role of Maria - in an All Bengal One Act Bengal Drama Competition organized in Howrah
- 2008 - Kaman - Special Recognition Prize for Acting: Debmita Sen in the role of The Daughter - in a Multilingual Short Drama Competition Festival organized in Kolkata
- 2009 - Anusaran - Best Production - in a District-level One Act Bengali Drama Competition organized in Howrah, Best Actor: Amajit Basu in the role of the United States Department of Homeland Security Agent - in a District-level One Act Bengali Drama Competition organized in Howrah, Best Co-actor: Debdip Sen in the role of An American Citizen - in a District-level One Act Bengali Drama Competition organized in Howrah
- 2010 - Danawala Ekta Buro - Best Actress: Koyel Ghosh in the role of Maria - in a Multilingual Short Drama Competition Festival organized in Kolkata
- 2010 - Anusaran - 2nd Best Production - in an All Bengal One Act Bengali Drama Competition organized in Howrah
- 2011 - No Exit - Special Recognition Prize for Production - in a Multilingual Short Drama Competition Festival organized in Kolkata, Best Actor: Amajit Basu in the role of Robin Chatterjee (Garcin) - in a Multilingual Short Drama Competition Festival organized in Kolkata, Best Actress: Koyel Ghosh in the role of Nina Roy (Estelle) - in a Multilingual Short Drama Competition Festival organized in Kolkata
- 2012 - Danawala Ekta Buro - 3rd Best Production - in an All Bengal One Act Bengali Drama Competition organized in Howrah
- 2012 - Mayabari The Grand House of Illusion - Best Production - in a Multilingual Short Drama Competition Festival organized in Kolkata, Best Actor: Amajit Basu in the role of Thor - in a Multilingual Short Drama Competition Festival organized in Kolkata
- 2013 - Metamorphosis - Best Production - in a Multilingual Short Drama Competition Festival organized in Kolkata, Best Director: Amajit Basu - in a Multilingual Short Drama Competition Festival organized in Kolkata
- 2014 - The Visit - 2nd Best Production - in a Multilingual Short Drama Competition Festival organized in Kolkata, Best Actor: Amajit Basu - in a Multilingual Short Drama Competition Festival organized in Kolkata, Best Dramatist (Script): Amajit Basu - in a Multilingual Short Drama Competition Festival organized in Kolkata
- 2014 - Kaman - 2nd Best Production - in an All Bengal One Act Bengali Drama Competition organized in Howrah
- 2015 - Pedro Páramo - Best Director: Amajit Basu - in an All Bengal Full Length Drama Competition organized in Howrah, Best Actor: Amajit Basu - in an All Bengal Full Length Drama Competition organized in Howrah
- 2015 - Gimpel The Fool - Best Production - in a Multilingual Short Drama Competition Festival organized in Kolkata, Best Direction: Amajit Basu - in a Multilingual Short Drama Competition Festival organized in Kolkata, Best Actor: Amajit Basu - in a Multilingual Short Drama Competition Festival organized in Kolkata
- 2016 - Apocalypse - 3rd Best Production - in a Multilingual Short Drama Competition Festival organized in Kolkata, Special Recognition Award for Child Actor: Ms. Zohareen Basu in the role of Gina - in a Multilingual Short Drama Competition Festival organized in Kolkata
- 2017 - The Old Man and The Sea - Best Dramatist (Script): Amajit Basu - in a Multilingual Short Drama Competition Festival organized in Kolkata
- 2018 - Love, Food, Nation a.k.a. Mutton Cutlet - Best Production - in a Multilingual Short Drama Competition Festival organized in Kolkata, Best Director: Dr. Amajit Basu - in a Multilingual Short Drama Competition Festival organized in Kolkata, Best Actor: Mr. Amajit Basu in the role of The Waiter - in a Multilingual Short Drama Competition Festival organized in Kolkata
- 2019 - Freedom - Best Production - in a Multilingual Short Drama Competition Festival organized in Kolkata, Best Director: Dr. Amajit Basu - in a Multilingual Short Drama Competition Festival organized in Kolkata
