= The Solitude of Latin America =

1982 lecture by Gabriel García Márquez

"The Solitude of Latin America" (Spanish: La Soledad de América Latina) is the title of the speech given by Gabriel García Márquez on 8 December 1982 upon being awarded the 1982 Nobel Prize in Literature. The Nobel Prize was presented to García Márquez by Professor Lars Gyllensten of the Swedish Academy.

García Márquez gained fame for his novel One Hundred Years of Solitude, first published in 1967. According to the Nobel Foundation, García Márquez was awarded the 1982 Nobel Prize in Literature for “his novels and short stories, in which the fantastic and the realistic are combined in a richly composed world of imagination, reflecting a continent’s life and conflicts". The style of prose to which the Nobel Foundation refers is known as magic realism, a broadly descriptive term critics use to describe García Márquez's work.

== Themes ==
Several themes García Márquez addresses in his speech mirror those of his short stories and novels. García Márquez touches on the conquest of the Americas, colonial legacies, deterritorialization of the Latin American culture, and he specifically addresses Latin American countries that have been affected negatively by foreign policy.

=== Colonial legacies ===
==== Instability within Latin America ====
"There have been five wars and seventeen military coups; there emerged a diabolic dictator who is carrying out, in God’s name, the first Latin American ethnocide of our time….numerous women arrested while pregnant have given birth in Argentine prisons, yet nobody knows the whereabouts and identity of their children who were furtively adopted or sent to an orphanage by order of the military authorities".

==== Modernity ====
Another colonial legacy addressed, indirectly, in this speech is the concept of modernity in regards to European and Western colonialism. Initially, during the Enlightenment Era, the Europeans came up with the idea of modernity to compare themselves to the “others” of the world. Europe calling themselves modern automatically placed unknown cultures in the inferior, or un-modern category. Márquez addresses this in his speech when he uses the example of the United States using a, “yardstick that they use [to measure] themselves,” to measure those in Latin America.

Once García Márquez addresses the colonial legacies and their lingering effects, he then goes into the ongoing process Latin America is currently going through, de/territorialization, or, the process of weakening the ties between culture and space. The process of deterritorialization itself involves the two separate processes of deterritorialization and reterritorialization. In simple terms, this can be thought of as rejecting the dominant colonial power legacies while at the same time reclaiming your own culture. In his speech, Marquez mentions the Central American civil wars of the 1970s and the influx of refugees that left their homeland as a result. To get an idea of the mass number of people displaced by these wars, Marquez gives us this comparison, “…the country that could be formed of all the exiles and forced emigrants of Latin America would have a population larger than that of Norway".

=== Ongoing struggle within Latin America ===
García Márquez wanted to raise awareness, with this speech, to the ongoing struggle of the Latin American people to have cultural respect from the rest of the hegemonic world. In his speech, Marquez addresses how Europeans are so readily accepting of Latin American culture in the form of art and literature, yet they are so mistrustful of Latin American social movements. For example, in Central America, when people wanted to simply change things within their country to make it better, they were confronted with military authorities and the mistrustful eye of the north. An example of how much this social unrest affected these small Latin American countries is given in the speech, “…Uruguay…has lost to exile one out of every five citizens…the Civil War in El Salvador has produced one refugee every twenty minutes”.

"Solidarity with our dreams will not make us feel less alone, as long as it is not translated into concrete acts of legitimate support for all the peoples that assume the illusion of having a life of their own in the distribution of the world."

In this quote, García Márquez addresses the ongoing relationship between Latin America and the dominant western powers.
