= Plinio Apuleyo Mendoza =

Colombian journalist, writer and diplomat (1931–2026)

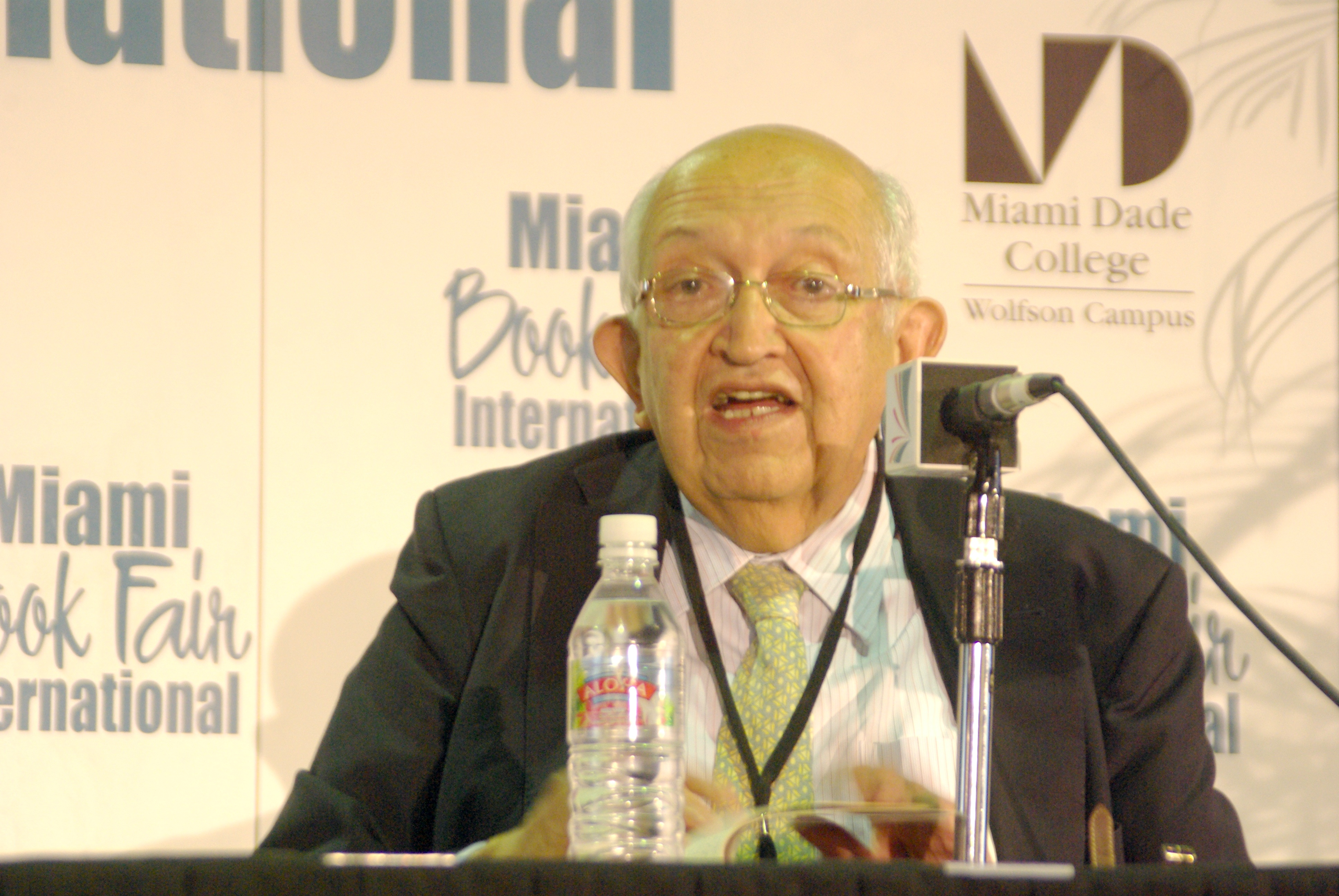
Apuleyo Mendoza at the Miami Book Fair International in 2011

Plinio Apuleyo Mendoza (March 24, 1931 – July 28, 2026) was a Colombian journalist, writer and diplomat. He was named in honour of the Roman authors Pliny the Younger and Apuleius.

== Life and career ==
Plinio Apuleyo Mendoza, born in Tunja, department of Boyacá, on March 24, 1931, was the son of the lawyer and politician Plinio Mendoza Neira, who witnessed the 1948 assassination of Jorge Eliécer Gaitán. He studied political science at the Sorbonne in Paris.

He had a close friendship with Nobel Prize winner Gabriel García Márquez. They spent time in Europe during the early 1960s. Mendoza published a biographical novel regarding the life and anecdotes of García Márquez and their circle of friends, poets, and writers during those years in Europe. The book was entitled The Fragrance of Guava. Mendoza served as first secretary of the Colombian Embassy in France, writing newspaper articles for several international publications at the same time. After returning to Colombia in 1959, he became a full-time writer and journalist.

Mendoza died on July 28, 2026, at the age of 95.

== Works ==
=== Short stories ===
- The Deserter. Short Stories. 1974
- The day that we buried the weapons. 2014

=== Novels ===
- Vanishing years. 1979
- Five days at the island. 1997
- Between two waters. 2010

=== Non-fiction ===
- The flame and the ice. 1984
- People, places: selection of articles written in Europe and America. 1986
- Fire zones: the guerrilla in Colombia, reportage and analysis.
- Our painters in Paris. 1989
- The challenges of the power: open letter to former Colombian presidents. 1991
- The sun continues rising. 1994
- Those times with Gabo, 2000, extension of one of the chapters of 1984
- Wind time: portraits, mementos, 2002
- An unknown García Márquez, 2009
- Many things to tell, 2012
- Gabo: letters and mementos, 2013, an extension of the 2000 book
- The country of my father, 2013

=== As co-author ===
- The Fragrance of Guava. 1982 with Gabriel García Márquez
- Guide to the Perfect Latin American Idiot. 1996. With Carlos Alberto Montaner and Álvaro Vargas Llosa
- Manufacturers of misery: politicians, priests, soldiers, businessmen, unions ..., 1998, with Carlos Alberto Montaner and Álvaro Vargas Llosa
- The Return of the Idiot, 2007, with Carlos Alberto Montaner and Álvaro Vargas Llosa
- Latest news of the new Spanish American Idiot, 2014, with Carlos Alberto Montaner and Álvaro Vargas Llosa
