= Biblioteca Gabriel García Márquez =

Public library in Barcelona, Spain

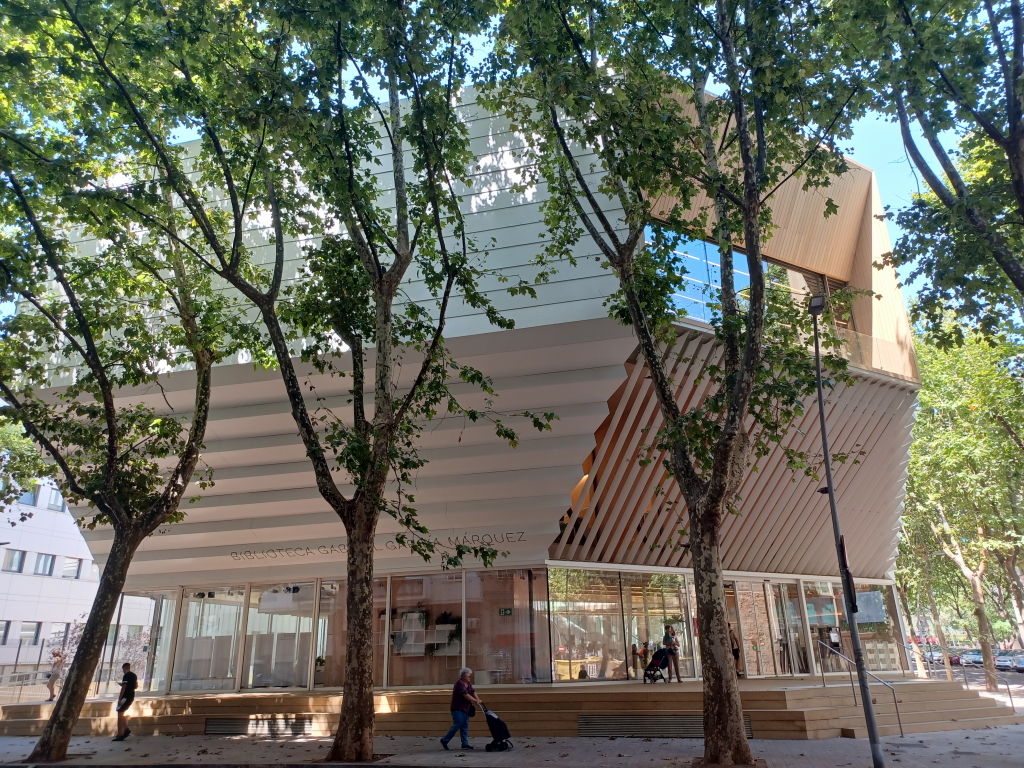
- Gabriel García Márquez Library
- 41°25′02″N 02°12′00″E
- Location: Plaça de Carmen Balcells Segalà, 1, Sant Martí de Provençals, Barcelona, Spain
- Established: 28 May 2022
- Architect: Suma Arquitectura
- Service area: Sant Martí de Provençals
- Branch of: Biblioteques de Barcelona

Other information
- Director: Neus Castellano
- Parent organization: Biblioteques de Barcelona
- Affiliation: Public library
- Website: Biblioteca Gabriel García Márquez

The Biblioteca Gabriel García Márquez is a public library located in Sant Martí de Provençals, a neighborhood of Barcelona. It was inaugurated on 28 May 2022. It specializes in Latin American literature and is named after the Colombian writer Gabriel García Márquez, who lived in the Catalan capital between 1967 and 1975, where he wrote The Autumn of the Patriarch (El otoño del patriarca).

== Description ==
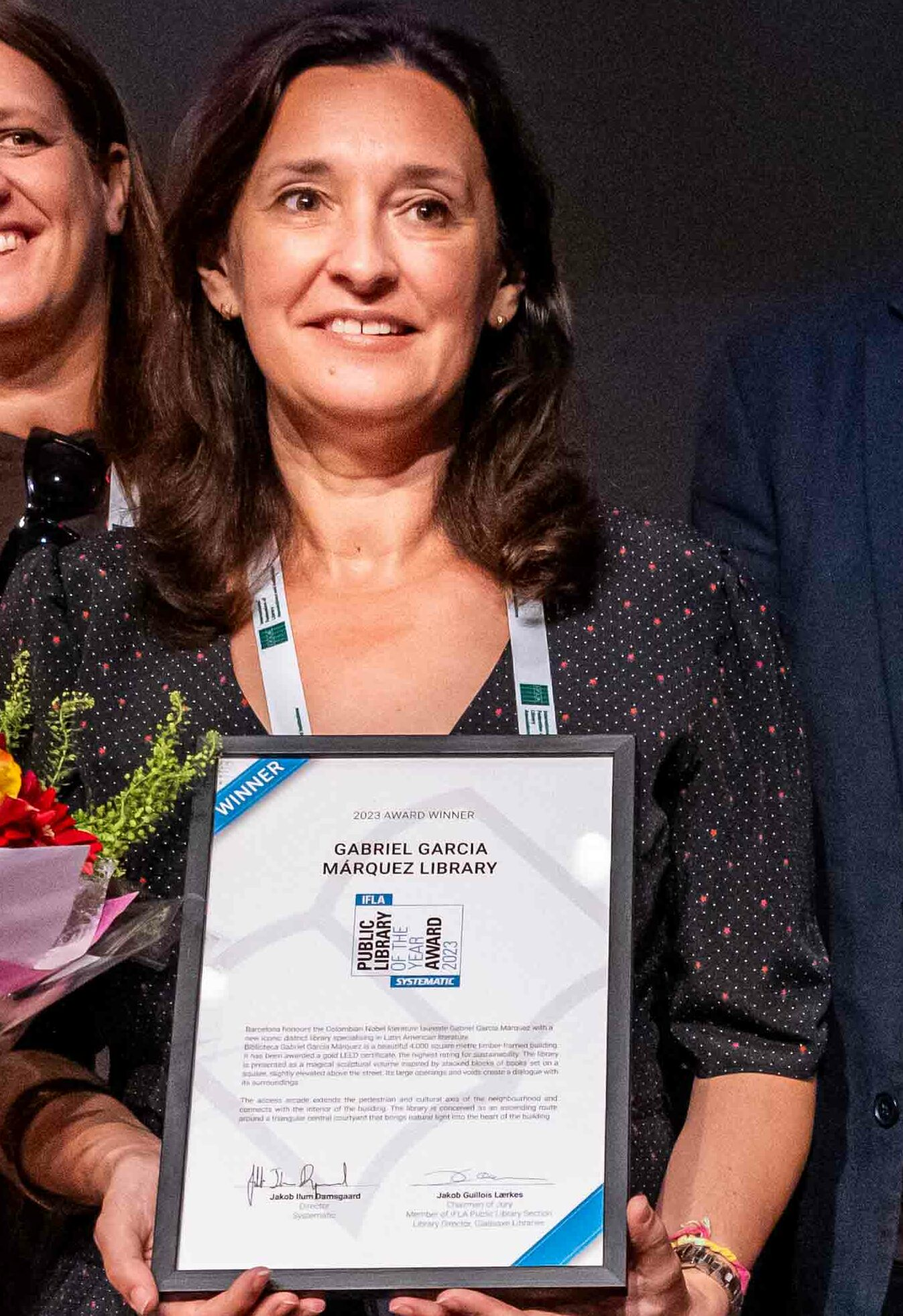
Neus Castellano with the award

The building was designed by Suma Arquitectura, a studio led by architects Elena Orte and Guillermo Sevillano. It formally opened on 28 May 2022 with Barcelona's former mayor Ada Colau, minister Joan Subirats and the cartoonist Francisco Ibáñez Talavera in attendance. The library will hold the archives of Francisco Ibáñez Talavera who lived locally.

The building has six floors and with about 4,000 m^{2} of floor it is the third largest library in Barcelona. The use of wood throughout the building stands out, a material that provides a welcoming atmosphere and contributes to the aim of reducing the centre's environmental footprint. Its appearance from the outside resembles a stack of open books. The library specialises in Latin American literature and it is named for Gabriel García Márquez, the Colombian Nobel laureate who spent the years 1967 to 1975 in Barcelona.

In August 2023 the library was declared the "best new public library in the world" by the International Federation of Library Associations and Institutions. No other Spanish library has ever been nominated for the award, which was given in Rotterdam to the library's director Neus Castellano. Castellano believed they had won in part because the new library welcomes people with an atmosphere like their home, complete with sofas.
