= The Fragrance of Guava =

1982 book by Gabriel García Márquez

The Fragrance of Guava. (1983) English edition. Faber and Faber pub. London

The Fragrance of Guava is a book based on the long conversations between Gabriel García Márquez and his close friend Plinio Apuleyo Mendoza. Published in 1982, the book describes the life of García Márquez, from his early childhood to his encounters with celebrities. The title of the book in Spanish is El Olor de la Guayaba. It was translated as The Fragrance of Guava.

== Background ==
García Márquez and Mendoza met in Bogotá when they were 20 and 16 years old respectively; seven years later in Paris, García Márquez contacted Mendoza. Gabriel García Márquez had met his best friend. Mendoza became a friend who helped García Márquez during the most difficult years: he fed him, offered a job, gave him money, read his manuscripts, he protected him. Plinio Apuleyo Mendoza recognized "And he paid back more than the things I could do for him".

An editorial proposed to Plinio to write a book about his best friend, Plinio discussed the idea with García Márquez, who found it interesting. The Nobel Laureate commented: "It is a great idea, as this way I won't have to repeat everything in each interview".

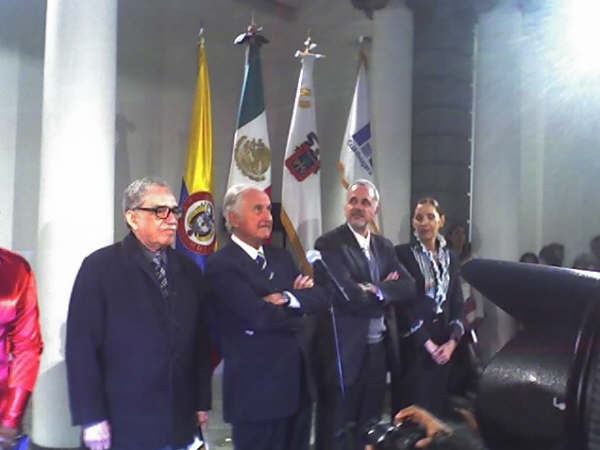
Gabriel García Márquez and Carlos Fuentes

In an interview Plinio Apuleyo Mendoza confessed the book was not based on a single interview with the Nobel Laureate: "I had conversed with him for 40 years, I wrote everything he had already told me, and I sent him the manuscript for being complemented". According to the biographer of García Márquez, Gerald Martin, The Fragrance of Guava is a calculated conversation, that explains the whole life of García Márquez and his opinions, from politics to women.

== Synopsis ==
The book includes fourteen chapters about the different details of Gabriel García Márquez's life, from his origins, family, readings and influences to his works, politics, women, superstitions, and fame.

The conversation began talking about the personal life of the author, the ancestors of García Márquez, Aracataca his hometown, his grandparents; the book describes several of events that influenced García Márquez works, how his grandmother talked with deceased relatives and the death of his grandfather. In the book, Mendoza asked about García Márquez's relatives, and how a character of Leaf Storm resembles his grandfather.

In the book, Mendoza and García Márquez discussed the works of the Nobel Laureate. There is a chapter dedicated to his writing routine, the main influences in his writing, and how some phenomena that appeared in his novels are based on real events. The author reviewed his own works; commenting that he considered The Autumn of the Patriarch a more important literary achievement than One Hundred Years of Solitude; and it also describes the years García Márquez had to wait until a work got some recognition, from the Leaf Storm his first novel, to One Hundred Years of Solitude passed 15 years.

The book finished talking about the public life of García Márquez, the women that marked his life, his political preferences, and the celebrities he met during his life. García Márquez met people from all the different spheres, from writers and artists to politicians and ecclesiastic leaders. But at the end when Mendoza asked who was the most interesting person he had met, he answered: my wife.

== Relevant people mentioned ==
- Mario Vargas Llosa
- Julio Cortázar
- Carlos Barral
- Milan Kundera
- Régis Debray
- Rossana Rossanda
- Teodoro Petkoff
- Geraldine Chaplin
- Miguel Littín
- Carmen Balcells
- Monica Vitti
- Luis Buñuel
- Pablo Neruda
- Jorge Amado
- François Mitterrand
- Carlos Fuentes
- Luis Cardoza y Aragón
- Danielle Mitterrand
- Omar Torrijos
- Graham Greene
- Pope John Paul II
- Margaux Hemingway
