= Mercedes Barcha =

Wife of novelist Gabriel García Márquez

- Born: November 6, 1932; Magangué, Colombia
- Died: August 15, 2020 (aged 87); Mexico City, Mexico
- Spouse: Gabriel García Márquez (m. 1958; died 2014)
- Children: 2

Mercedes Raquel Barcha Pardo (November 6, 1932 – August 15, 2020) was the wife of novelist Gabriel García Márquez (1927–2014).

== Life ==
Barcha was born on November 6, 1932, in Magangué, Colombia, to an Egyptian father of Syrian origins who ran pharmacies and grocery stores and a Colombian mother (Raquel Pardo) a Homemaker. Barcha is best known for her financial and emotional support of her Nobel Prize-winning husband, the author Gabriel García Márquez. She famously pawned her hair dryer to raise the postage needed to mail the draft of One Hundred Years of Solitude to the publisher.

She went by the nickname "La Gaba", a feminine version of her husband's nickname "Gabo".

== Marriage ==
She met García Márquez in 1941 when they were both still children; he was 14 and she was nine. In The Fragrance of Guava, it is recounted how García Márquez proposed to her at a school dance when she was 13. They finally married in Barranquilla on March 21, 1958, when he was 31 and she was 25. The couple had two sons: director Rodrigo García and graphic designer Gonzalo García. At the end of The Fragrance of Guava, when García Márquez was asked who was the most interesting person he had ever met, he answered "my wife".

== Occupation ==
In 2014, after García Márquez's death, she served as the President Emerita of the Gabriel Garcia Marquez Iberoamerican Foundation for New Journalism in Cartagena, Colombia. In 2017, she founded the Fundación Gabo to promote García Márquez's legacy.

== Death ==
Barcha died in Mexico City on August 15, 2020.
