= Marquess of Vargas Llosa =

Hereditary title in the Spanish nobility

Marquessate of Vargas Llosa
- Creation date: 3 February 2011
- Created by: Juan Carlos I of Spain
- Peerage: Spanish nobility
- First holder: Mario Vargas Llosa, 1st Marquess of Vargas Llosa
- Present holder: Álvaro Vargas-Llosa, 2nd Marquess of Vargas Llosa
- Heir apparent: Leandro Vargas-Llosa y Abad
- Remainder to: Heirs of the body of the grantee according to absolute primogeniture

Marquess of Vargas Llosa (Spanish: Marqués de Vargas Llosa) is a hereditary title in the Spanish nobility created in 2011 by King Juan Carlos I in favor of Mario Vargas Llosa, renowned writer and Nobel laureate.

His style of address is: Ilustrísimo Señor Marqués de Vargas Llosa ("The Most Illustrious The Marquess of Vargas Llosa").

== Marquesses of Vargas Llosa ==
- Jorge Mario Pedro Vargas Llosa, 1st Marquess of Vargas Llosa (1936–2025)
- Álvaro Mario Vargas-Llosa, 2nd Marquess of Vargas Llosa (2026–present)

The heir apparent is the holder's eldest son, Leandro Vargas-Llosa y Abad.
