= 1982 Nobel Prize in Literature =

- Gabriel García Márquez
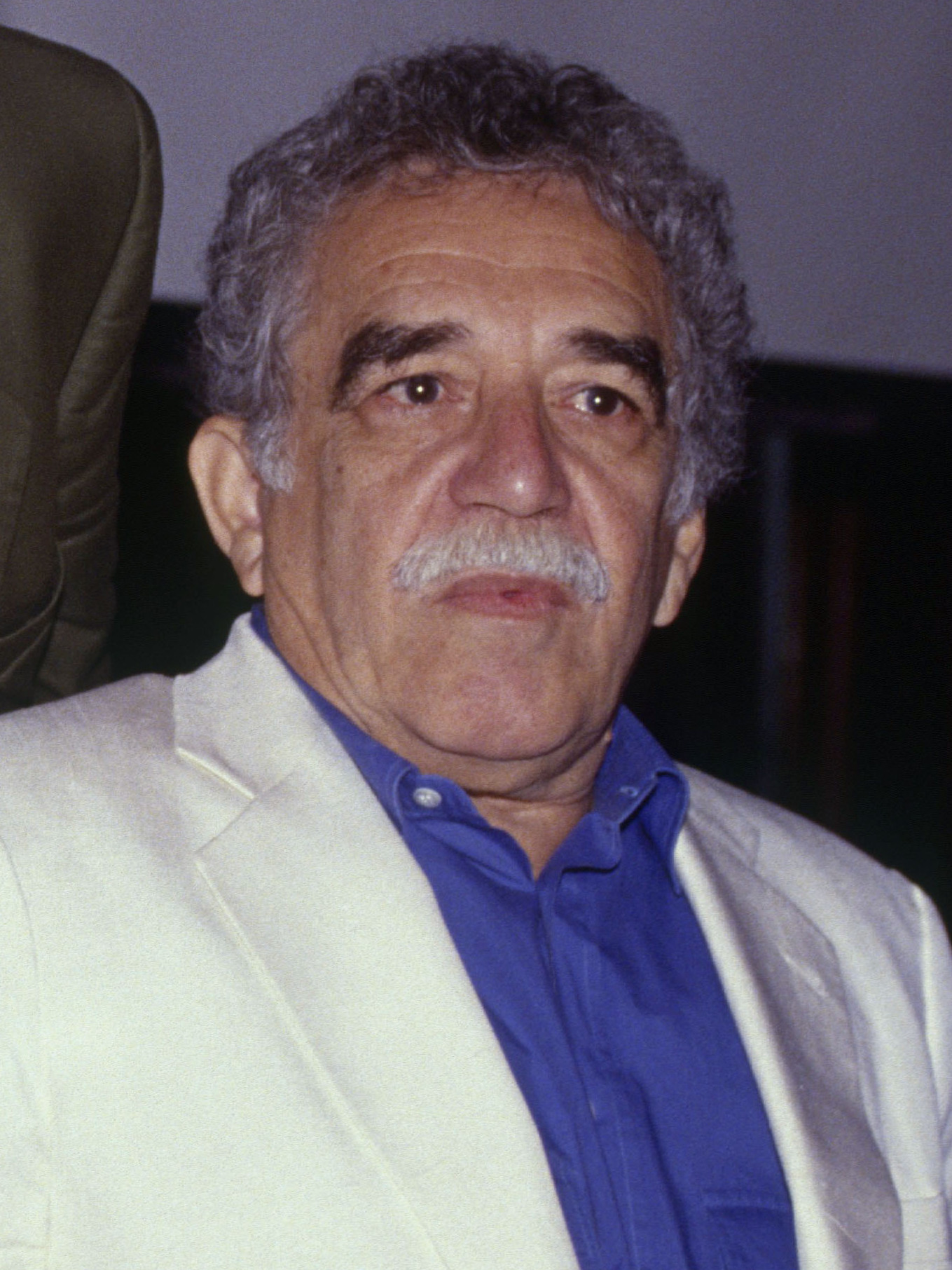
- "for his novels and short stories, in which the fantastic and the realistic are combined in a richly composed world of imagination, reflecting a continent's life and conflicts."
- Date: 21 October 1982 (announcement); 10 December 1982 (ceremony)
- Location: Stockholm, Sweden
- Presented by: Swedish Academy
- First award: 1901
- Website: Official website

The 1982 Nobel Prize in Literature was awarded to the Colombian writer Gabriel García Márquez (1927–2014) "for his novels and short stories, in which the fantastic and the realistic are combined in a richly composed world of imagination, reflecting a continent's life and conflicts."

García Márquez was the first Colombian and only the fourth Latin American writer to receive the Nobel Prize in Literature.

== Laureate ==
García Márquez's international success came with the novel Cien años de soledad ("One Hundred Years of Solitude", 1967). He is one of the foremost interpreters of magical realism in literature, a genre in which the framework narrative is set in a real place and time, but supernatural and dreamlike elements are part of the portrayal. The novels El otoño del patriarca ("The Autumn of the Patriarch", 1975), Crónica de una muerte anunciada ("Chronicle of a Death Foretold", 1981) and El amor en los tiempos del colera ("Love in the Time of Cholera", 1985) cemented his position as one of the greatest Latin American writers of all time.

== Reactions ==
The choice of García Márquez as the Nobel Prize Laureate in 1982 was enthusiastically well received by literary critics and readers around the world. García Márquez was among the favourites to receive the prize, other candidates for the prize that got strong attention in the press this year were Octavio Paz (awarded in 1990), Marguerite Yourcenar, Nadine Gordimer (awarded in 1991), Kurt Vonnegut, Yasushi Inoue, René Char, Henri Michaux and Mario Vargas Llosa (awarded in 2010).

== Award ceremony ==
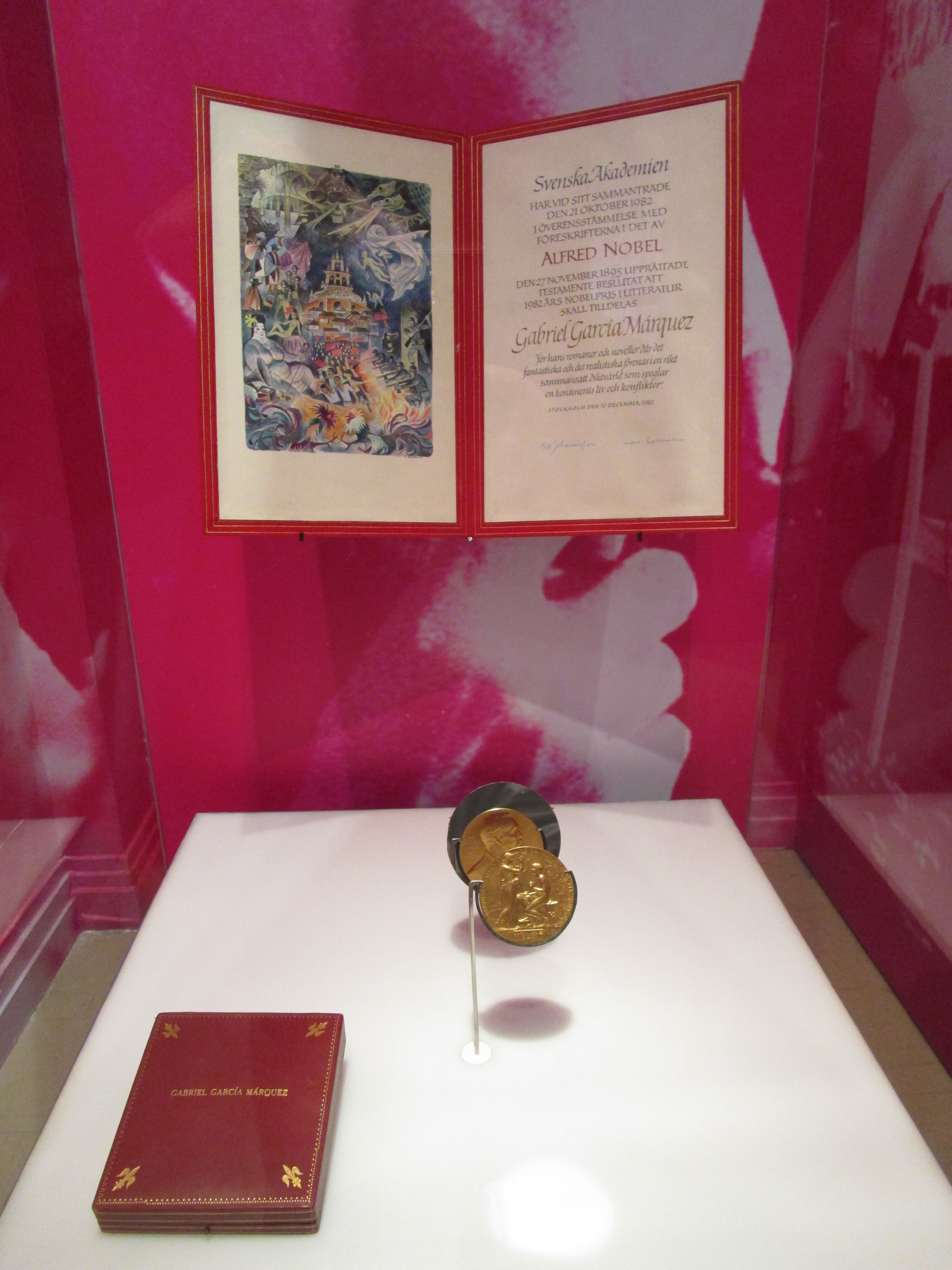
The Nobel Prize awarded to Gabriel Garcia Marquez.

In his award ceremony speech on 10 December 1982, Lars Gyllensten of the Swedish Academy said that the Academy "could not be said to bring forward an unknown writer", pointing out the unusual success of García Márquez's 1967 novel One Hundred Years of Solitude. He spoke of García Márquez as a "rare storyteller richly endowed with a material, from imagination and experience, which seems inexhaustible" and his importance in bringing attention to Latin American literature. "The great novels remind one of William Faulkner", Gyllensten said, "With his stories García Márquez has created a world of his own which is a microcosmos. In its tumultuous, bewildering yet graphically convincing authenticity it reflects a continent and its human riches and poverty."

== Nobel lecture ==
Gabriel García Márquez Nobel lecture The Solitude of Latin America was delivered at the Swedish Academy on 8 December 1982.
