= A Very Old Man with Enormous Wings =

- Short story by Gabriel García Márquez
- Original title: Un señor muy viejo con unas alas enormes
- Translator: Gregory Rabassa
- Country: Colombia
- Language: Spanish
- Genre: Magic realism • fantasy

Publication
- Published in: Casa de las Américas
- Publication type: Journal
- Publisher: Casa de las Américas, Havana
- Media type: Print
- Publication date: 1968
- Published in English: 1971
- Series: Men

"A Very Old Man with Enormous Wings" (Spanish: Un señor muy viejo con unas alas enormes) and subtitled "A Tale for Children" is a short story by Colombian author Gabriel García Márquez. The tale was written in 1968 and published in the May–June 1968 (VIII, 48) issue of the journal Casa de las Américas. The work was published in English in the New American Review 13 in 1971. It appeared in the 1972 book Leaf Storm and Other Stories. The short story is introduced with a medieval rhetorical question: How many angels can fit on the head of a pin? It involves the eponymous character who appears in a family's backyard on a stormy night. What follows are the reactions of the family, a town, and outside visitors. This story falls within the genre of magic realism or fantasy.

== Plot ==
The story begins after three days of rain. Crabs are infesting Pelayo and Elisenda's house and causing a horrible stench, which is believed to be making their baby sick. When Pelayo comes back from throwing the crabs into the sea, he sees a very old man with wings laying face down in mud in his courtyard. Startled, Pelayo goes to get his wife and they examine the man. He is dressed in raggedy clothing and is very dirty. After staring at him for a time, Pelayo and Elisenda are able to overcome their initial shock of seeing the man with wings. They try to speak to him but the man speaks in an incomprehensible dialect. They decide he is a castaway from a shipwreck; however, a neighbor informs them that the man is an angel.

The following day, the entire town knows about the man with wings who is said to be an angel. Pelayo decides to chain up the man and keep him in the chicken coop. A day later, when the rain stops, the baby is feeling better and is able to eat. Pelayo and Elisenda want to send the old man out to sea with food and water for three days and let nature take care of him. However, when they go out to their courtyard, they see a mass of people gathered around the chicken coop to see the angel; they are harassing him by treating him like a circus animal instead of a person.

The priest, Father Gonzaga, comes by the house because he is surprised by the news of the angel. At this time, onlookers are making hypotheses about what should happen to the angel, saying things like "he should be the leader of the world," or "he should be a military leader in order to win all wars." However, Father Gonzaga decides to determine whether the man is an angel or not by speaking to him in Latin. Since the man with wings does not recognize Latin and looks too human, the priest decides the man cannot be an angel, and warns the onlookers that the man is not an angel. However, the people do not care, and word spreads.

People began coming from all over to Pelayo and Elisenda's house to see the angel. It reaches a point that they have to build a fence and charge people admission. However, the old man wants nothing to do with this. His audiences attempt to get him to react, at one point prodding him with hot iron pokers. The angel responds in anger, flapping his wings and yelling in his strange language.

Later, a new carnival arrives in town bringing a woman who has metamorphosed into a spider. The townspeople lose interest in the angel. However, Pelayo and Elisenda are able to build a mansion with the fortune they have gained by charging admission. The child grows older and is told not to go into the chicken coop. Yet the child does, and later the child and the old man have chicken pox at the same time.

Once the child is of school age, the chicken coop is broken down and the man begins to appear in Pelayo and Elisenda's house. He then moves into the shed and becomes very ill. Yet, he survives the winter and becomes stronger. One fateful day, Elisenda is making lunch and looks out the window to see the old man trying to fly. His first attempts are clumsy, but eventually he is able to gain altitude and fly away from Pelayo and Elisenda's house. Elisenda is relieved "for herself and for him", upon seeing him go.

== Characters ==
- Pelayo: Pelayo is the father of the child and Elisenda's husband. He discovers the old man in his backyard.
- Elisenda: Pelayo's wife and mother of his child. It is Elisenda who comes up with the idea of charging people to see the old man and ultimately is the last to see him before he takes off.
- The Old Man: The subject of much debate and the target of the townsfolks' relentless prodding. The mystery of the old man's existence and history goes unresolved. He first appears in the backyard of Pelayo's house after three days of rain, weak and mud-covered. The family ushers him into the chicken coop where he is held as a sort of sideshow attraction. When the crowds first start to come around, he is absentminded and patient with the ordeal. Later, the crowds burn him with a branding iron and he flaps his wings in pain. In the end, he grows back all of his feathers and flies away. The old man is described many times throughout as having "antiquarian" eyes.
- Father Gonzaga: Father Gonzaga is the town priest and the authority figure of the town. He is described as having been "a robust woodcutter" before becoming a priest. Father Gonzaga suspects the old man is an imposter because he doesn't know Latin, the language of God. He then contacts the Church and awaits verdict from higher authority.
- The Neighbor: The Neighbor is said to know everything about life and death. She thinks that the Old Man is an angel who has fallen from the sky and came for Pelayo's son. While her advice for clubbing the Old Man is not taken, she still attempts to help her neighbors Pelayo and Elisenda.
- Spider Woman: The Spider Woman essentially comes and takes the Old Man's fame. She was a child who crept out of her parents’ house one night to go to a dance. After disobeying her parents, she was transformed into a tarantula with the head of a woman. The people forget about the Old Man and focus their interest on her. In contrast to the Old Man, who does not talk or move much, she is always open to tell her story, so the villagers abandon the Old Man when she comes. The Spider Woman is attractive to the visitors because she is a relatable character who has been against some struggle as opposed to the seemingly cold and alien Old Man.
- The Child: The child is Pelayo and Elisenda's newborn baby, who is ill when the story opens. The Neighbor tries to tell the family that the Old Man came to take the baby. The Old Man and the child are somewhat connected. They are ill at the same time and play together.

== Themes ==
There is a theme of interpreting authority structures as we see with Father Gonzaga and the neighbor. There is also a theme of the human condition when considering the old man and how he is not seen as angelic because of his earthly qualities. The human condition is important when considering the Spider Woman as her tale attracts visitors because they find her more relatable compared to the old man.

Some other themes are the parallels between the child and the angel as the two seem to be connected. The theme of wings and their symbolism are represented in this story as well. The significance of the wings in relation to the old man's characteristics and Marquez's use of wings can be interpreted to act as a logic of supplement. The wings separate this old man from the rest of the community. Even when the doctor is examining the wings they appear natural but different from the usual anatomy. There is also an underlying theme of questioning sacred and secular images.

Uncertainty and ambiguity are also seen throughout the piece--one aspect of what makes it an example of magic realism. Although the world seems to exist within what we would consider a plausible town in a fairly recent time, no evidence to where or when is provided to offer any concrete context. Airplanes are mentioned and Father Gonzaga can communicate with the Pope, but still the ambiguous town seems to exist in a world more parallel to any the reader would be familiar with. Uncertainty is also linked to the old man's existence. Marquez provides suggestions for explanations though the townspeople's guesses, mainly that he is an angel, but no real answer is given. The narrator offers no conclusive reactions or evidence to suggest any of the presented possibilities are true.

== Magic realism ==
Most of the 'magical' aspects of the story, primarily the old man's wings and strange transformation of the spider woman, are treated by the townsfolk with curiosity and fascination, but no more than would be directed towards an animal in the circus. The treatment of supernatural, magical, or otherwise impossible events, characters, and settings is what defines the magical realism genre. This is demonstrated both in the matter-of-fact tone Marquez uses to place magical phenomenon into seemingly realistic settings, and the ease at which the characters come to accept the magical realism as part of their everyday life. For instance, upon the protagonists' first encounter with the old man, it is written, "They looked at him so long and so closely that Pelayo and Elisenda very soon overcame their surprise and in the end found him familiar." After the townsfolk lost interest in the supposed angel and Pelayo and Elisenda had profited enough to build a mansion for themselves, the couple merely tolerates the old man, treating him more as a burden or nuisance than an adopted member of the family. Initial shock long gone and the magic faded and Elisenda only puts up a small fight to keep the old man from flying away at the end of the story. As the third-person omniscient narrator reveals, Elisenda "kept watching him even when she was through cutting the onions and she kept on watching until it was no longer possible for her to see him, because then he was no longer an annoyance in her life but an imaginary dot on the horizon of the sea."

Additionally, the description of the old man's appearance makes the otherworldly presence of wings seem commonplace. When Father Gonzaga visits the old man for an inspection he notes that "seen close up he was much too human: he had an unbearable smell of the outdoors, the back side of his wings was strewn with parasites and his main feathers had been mistreated by terrestrial winds, and nothing about him measured up to the proud dignity of angels." Instead of emphasizing the extraordinary existence of the wings, Marquez draws the reader's attention to the humanity present in the old man--what makes him not angelic.

== Context ==
The story has received several critical responses, most of which comment on Garcia Marquez's use of the magical realism genre.

In an article for the Journal of the Fantastic in the Arts, Greer Watson commented that there is little that is considered fantastic about the story, rather that elements such as the old man's wings are presented as an accepted fact. He goes on to state that it is only the angelic nature of the winged man that is drawn into question. Scholar John Goodwin argues that the text of the tale can be read as a commentary on La Violencia, as the short story was published during this time, writing that the "opinions of the villagers reveal an idealized view of religion as government; their treatment of the angel, however, betrays their reaction to rule by religious authorities." Marcy Schwartz felt that Garcia Marquez’s use of ambiguity was effective.

Vera M. Kutzinski commented on the use of wings in the story in the context of the Afro-American myth of flying and the trope of flying in general. In her analysis, she uses a quote from Garcia Marquez which discusses his connections and inspiration from the Caribbean as well as the importance of mestizo identity. She also emphasizes the use of sorcery and flying in traditional Afro-American folklore while also drawing historical and literary comparisons to other writers’ works such as Juan Rodriguez Freyle's El carnero (1636) and Alejo Carpentier's The Kingdom of This World (1957).

== Editions of the story ==
The story was originally written by Gabriel Garcia Marquez in Spanish in 1968. It was translated by Gregory Rabassa. It was originally published in 1971 and later published in the book Leaf Storm and Other Stories in 1972 in English.

The story was adapted for the stage by Nilo Cruz in 2002, which he published in the journal Theater. Theatre Formation Paribartak of India made the story into a play and has been staging it since 2005. Andrei Kureichik, a playwright and director from Belarus, did a Russian-language stage adaptation in 2004. It was produced widely in Belarus, Ukraine, and Russia, some of the main productions being the Belorussian State Youth Theater (Minsk, Belorussia, 2004), Priyut Komedianta (St. Petersburg, Russia, 2005), Shevchenko Theater (Chernihiv, Ukraine, 2010), and the Yakub Kolas Theater (Vitebsk, Belarus, 2020).
