= Guide to the Perfect Latin American Idiot =

1996 Latin American book

- Cover of the book
- Author: Plinio Apuleyo Mendoza, Carlos Alberto Montaner, Álvaro Vargas Llosa
- Original title: Manual del perfecto idiota latinoamericano
- Language: Spanish
- Subject: Left-wing populism
- Publisher: Plaza & Janés
- Publication date: 1996
- Media type: Print
- Pages: 336 p.
- ISBN: 9500816385
- Followed by: El regreso del idiota

Guide to the Perfect Latin American Idiot (Spanish: Manual del perfecto idiota latinoamericano) is an essay by Plinio Apuleyo Mendoza, Carlos Alberto Montaner and Álvaro Vargas Llosa published in 1996. The authors analyze Latin American history and the way of thinking of both the Latin American political elites and intellectuals. The same year an edition was published in Spain with an additional chapter and a different prologue.

== Content ==
The essays defend, from liberal positions, that an important part of the political and intellectual sectors are rooted in a Third-Worldism and nationalistic mentality, if not socialist, that lead them to a constant "patriotic" victim playing that presents the Western world and capitalism as the main culprit of the poor countries woes. And, furthermore, that by holding positions of social influence aid statespeople and intellectuals allow the spread of populism and the stagnation in underdevelopment in Latin American countries. The authors argue that the "idiot", as coined by essay, does not see the Latin American problems in the state structure and believes that it is possible to achieve well-being by repeating the same process that leads to the growth of the state, the accumulation of power by a caudillo and the impoverishment of the society. As examples of said mentality, the book cites Peronism in Argentina and Castrismo in Cuba.

The book, consisting of thirteen chapters, is prologued by Mario Vargas Llosa and is presented by the authors as an antithesis to the book The Open Veins of Latin America, published in 1971 by Eduardo Galeano.

Mendoza, Montaner and Vargas Llosa published a sequel in 2007 titled The Return of the Idiot (Spanish: El regreso del idiota).

== Reception ==
The book sold at least half a million copies.

== See also ==
- From the Noble Savage to the Noble Revolutionary
