= Álvaro Vargas-Llosa =

Peruvian-Spanish writer

Álvaro Mario Vargas-Llosa, 2nd Marquess of Vargas Llosa (born 18 March 1966) is a Peruvian-Spanish writer and political commentator and public speaker on international affairs. He is also the writer and presenter of a documentary series for National Geographic Channel on contemporary Latin American history that is being shown around the world. He is the President of the Fundación International para la Libertad (FIL) and of the Cátedra Vargas Llosa. He was very involved in the struggle for the return of democracy in Peru at the end of the 1990s and the years 2000–2001. He was a member of the Global Commission for Post-Pandemic Policy together with several former heads of government, notable business people and public intellectuals. He speaks English, Spanish and French.

Vargas-Llosa is the eldest son of writer and Nobel Prize laureate Mario Vargas Llosa and his second wife (and first cousin) Patricia Llosa. He is the brother of UNHCR representative Gonzalo Vargas-Llosa and photographer Morgana Vargas-Llosa. In 1992, he married Susana Abad, with whom he had a son, Leandro, and a daughter, Aitana. He and his wife are divorced. He is based in Washington, D.C., but spends a few months a year in Europe, and holds both the Peruvian and Spanish citizenships as a dual citizen. Álvaro Vargas-Llosa is the successor to the Marquisate of Vargas Llosa.

Álvaro Vargas-Llosa is senior fellow at the Independent Institute and a former head of the Center on Global Prosperity, who has been a nationally syndicated columnist for the Washington Post Writers Group, and is the author of the book Liberty for Latin America, which obtained the 2005 Antony Fisher International Memorial Award for its contribution to the cause of freedom. He has received numerous awards for his journalistic work as well as for his defense of freedom and liberal democracy under the rule of law. He was appointed Young Global Leader 2007 by the World Economic Forum in Davos. In 2012, Foreign Policy magazine nominated him one of the top 50 public intellectuals in the Spanish-speaking world. In 2021, he was awarded the 'Thomas Jefferson Award' by the Association of Private Enterprise Education (APEE) for his contribution to liberty.

In February 2026, he inherited his father's noble title.

He was appointed Peru's ambassador to the United States in 2026 by Keiko Fujimori.

== Books ==
=== In English ===
- Global Crossings: Immigration, Civilization, and America (2013) ISBN 1-59813-133-8
- The Che Guevara Myth and the Future of Liberty (2005) ISBN 1-59813-005-6
- Liberty for Latin America: How to Undo 500 years of State Oppression (2005) ISBN 0-374-18574-3
- Guide to the Perfect Latin American Idiot, with Plinio Apuleyo Mendoza and Carlos Alberto Montaner (1999) ISBN 1-56833-134-7
- Riding the Tiger: Ramiro de León Carpio's Battle for Human Rights in Guatemala with Santiago Aroca. (1995) ISBN 0-9648426-0-2
- The Madness of Things Peruvian: Democracy Under Siege (1994) ISBN 1-56000-114-3

=== In Spanish ===
- El polemista arriesgado. Catorce asedios liberales a Vargas Llosa (2025) ISBN 9788410433564
- Y tú, ¿dónde pones tu dinero? (2012) ISBN 978-98-717-8655-8
- El Regreso del Idiota, with Plinio Apuleyo Mendoza and Carlos Alberto Montaner (2007) ISBN 0-307-39151-5
- La fauna política latinoamericana : neopopulistas reyes pasmados e insoportables (2004) ISBN 956-8207-07-4
- La Mestiza de Pizarro: una mestiza entre dos mundos (2003) ISBN 84-03-09342-X
- En el Reino del Espanto (2000) ISBN 970-05-1197-9
- Tiempos de Resistencia (2000) ISBN 9972-40-147-2
- Cuando Hablaba Dormido (1999) ISBN 970-05-1125-1
- El Exilio Indomable: historia de la disidencia cubana en el destierro (1998) ISBN 84-239-7763-3
- La Contenta Barbarie (1993) ISBN 84-08-01021-2
- El Diablo en Campaña (1991) ISBN 84-03-59113-6

== Ancestry ==
Ancestors of Álvaro Vargas-Llosa

8. Marcelino Vargas
4. Ernesto Vargas Maldonado
9. Zenobia Maldonado
2. Mario Vargas Llosa, 1st Marquis of Vargas Llosa
20. Mariano Belisario Llosa Rivero (=24)
10. Pedro José Llosa Bustamante (=12)
21. María Victoria Bustamante Barreda (=25)
5. Dora Llosa Ureta
22. Luis Manuel Ureta de la Jara (=26)
11. Carmen Elena Ureta Vargas (=13)
23. Rosa Elena Vargas Gutiérrez (=27)
1. Álvaro Vargas-Llosa, 2nd Marquis of Vargas Llosa
24. Mariano Belisario Llosa Rivero (=20)
12. Pedro José Llosa Bustamante (=10)
25. María Victoria Bustamante Barreda (=21)
6. Luis Llosa Ureta
26. Luis Manuel Ureta de la Jara (=22)
13. Carmen Elena Ureta Vargas (=11)
27. Rosa Elena Vargas Gutiérrez (=23)
3. Patricia Llosa Urquidi
14. Carlos Urquidi
7. Olga Urquidi Yáñez
15. Carmen Yáñez

Spanish nobility
Preceded by Mario Vargas Llosa	Marquess of Vargas Llosa; 2026–present	Incumbent; Heir: Leandro Vargas Llosa
