= The Handsomest Drowned Man in the World =

Short story by Gabriel García Márquez

- Short story by Gabriel García Márquez.
- Original title: Spanish: El ahogado más hermoso del mundo
- Language: Spanish
- Genre: Short story

Publication
- Published in: 1968

"The Handsomest Drowned Man in the World" (Spanish: "El ahogado más hermoso del mundo") is a magical realist 1968 short story by the Colombian novelist Gabriel García Márquez.

== Plot ==
One Wednesday morning, children in a small fishing village of "about twenty-odd wooden houses" find a body on the beach that is covered with "Flotsam, jetsam, lagan, and sea debris". The children play by burying him in the sand until the adults discover the corpse and decide that it must be given a small funeral and thrown off the cliff on which their village rests. This is done because there is so little land in the village that they cannot have traditional burials. In order to do so, however, they must prepare him for burial at sea and look in neighboring villages for any surviving relatives. The men carry the body up to the village so that the women can prepare him for the funeral while they go to neighboring villages to ask if anyone can identify the drowned man.

The man is too tall to fit easily into any house and, upon removing the seaweed and mud, the women observe his handsome face. The women of the village become attached to him and dream of the wonderful man he must have been. Eventually, an old woman declares that his name must have been Esteban, and after a short period of resistance from some of the younger women, they all agree. After dreaming of how powerful Esteban must have been they decide to make him clothes because no one owns anything large enough to fit him. The pants they make are too small and the buttons on the shirt burst. The women then think about how he must have had to stoop to enter doorways and how he must have felt uncomfortable in the small homes. The women feel pity and sympathy for the man, who they silently compare to their own husbands, and they begin to weep for him. They then cover Esteban's face with a handkerchief.

The men are unable to find any relatives of the drowned man and they return home, where the village continues the funeral preparation as a group. The women, now attached to Esteban, place "altar decorations" on him, including a compass, holy water, and nails. The men grow annoyed and chide their wives for taking such elaborate measures for "a stranger". Esteban's face is then revealed to the men and they too are awed by the humble character they see in his face. Women go to get flowers in neighboring villages, since none grow in their own, and women from those villages come back to see Esteban. This continues until the village grows so crowded that it is "hard to walk about." They do not want Esteban buried as an "orphan" so a mother and father are chosen for him "from among the best people," as well as uncles, aunts, and cousins, until everyone is related to Esteban. Instead of burying him with an anchor they let him go without one so that he can return one day. This is when the village realizes how desolate and small their town appears.

After Esteban is buried at sea, the village resolves to make their doors wider for Esteban's memory, to find springs like he would have, to paint their houses bright colors, and to plant flowers. The village imagines that one day a passing cruise ship will smell the flowers and the captain will point to their village and tell his passengers that it was Esteban's home.

== Analysis ==
The story was included in Garcia Márquez's 1984 Collected Stories. A study guide has been produced for the story.

Constance Pedoto, in the Journal of Comparative Literature and Aesthetics, compares the magical realist story to tales from Alaska such as "The Cormorant Hunters" by the Iñupiat Frank Ellana or "Two Great Polar Bear Hunters" by the King Island Eskimo Aloysius Pikonganna. In her view, they are alike in combining the real and surreal, deriving from an upbringing which combined superstitious beliefs and a harsh environment.
