= Gabriel García Márquez =

Colombian writer and Nobel laureate (1928–2014)

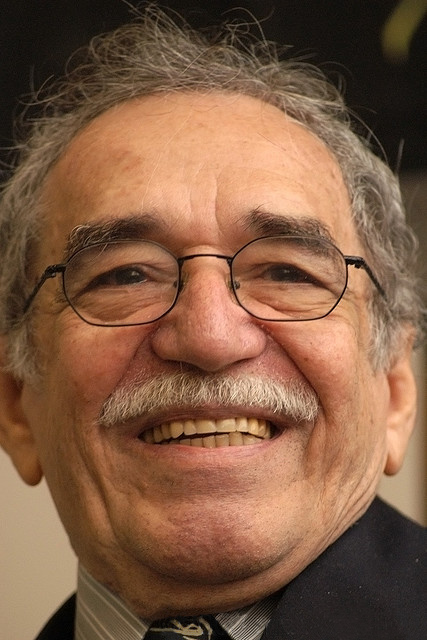
- García Márquez in 2002
- Born: Gabriel José García Márquez; 6 March 1928; Aracataca, Colombia
- Died: 17 April 2014 (aged 86); Mexico City, Mexico
- Education: National University of Colombia; University of Cartagena
- Spouse: Mercedes Barcha (m. 1958)
- Children: 3, including Rodrigo García
- Writing career
- Language: Spanish
- Genres: Novels; short stories
- Notable works: No One Writes to the Colonel; One Hundred Years of Solitude; The Autumn of the Patriarch; Chronicle of a Death Foretold; Love in the Time of Cholera
- Notable awards: Neustadt International Prize for Literature 1972; Nobel Prize in Literature 1982
- Movements: Latin American Boom; Magic realism

Gabriel José García Márquez (Latin American Spanish: [ɡaˈβɾjel ɣaɾˈsi.a ˈmaɾ.kes]; (Note: In isolation, García is pronounced [ɡaɾˈsi.a]) 6 March 1928 – 17 April 2014) was a Colombian writer and journalist, known affectionately as Gabo ([ˈɡaβo]) or Gabito ([ɡaˈβito]) throughout Latin America. Considered one of the most significant authors of the 20th century, particularly in the Spanish language, he was awarded the 1972 Neustadt International Prize for Literature and the 1982 Nobel Prize in Literature. He pursued a self-directed education that resulted in leaving law school for a career in journalism. From early on he showed no inhibitions in his criticism of Colombian and foreign politics. In 1958, he married Mercedes Barcha Pardo; they had two sons, Rodrigo and Gonzalo.

García Márquez started as a journalist and wrote many acclaimed non-fiction works and short stories. He is best known for his novels, such as No One Writes to the Colonel (1961); One Hundred Years of Solitude (1967), which has sold over fifty million copies worldwide; Chronicle of a Death Foretold (1981); and Love in the Time of Cholera (1985). His works have achieved significant critical acclaim and widespread commercial success, most notably for popularizing a literary style known as magic realism, which uses magical elements and events in otherwise ordinary and realistic situations. Some of his works are set in the fictional village of Macondo (mainly inspired by his birthplace, Aracataca), and most of them explore the theme of solitude. As of 2023, he is the most-translated Spanish-language author of the 21st century. In 1982, he was awarded the Nobel Prize in Literature, "for his novels and short stories, in which the fantastic and the realistic are combined in a richly composed world of imagination, reflecting a continent's life and conflicts". He was the fourth Latin American to receive the honor, following Chilean poets Gabriela Mistral (1945) and Pablo Neruda (1971), as well as Guatemalan novelist Miguel Ángel Asturias (1967). Alongside Jorge Luis Borges, García Márquez is regarded as one of the most renowned Latin American authors in history.

Upon García Márquez's death in April 2014, Juan Manuel Santos, the president of Colombia, called him "the greatest Colombian who ever lived".

== Biography ==
=== Early life ===
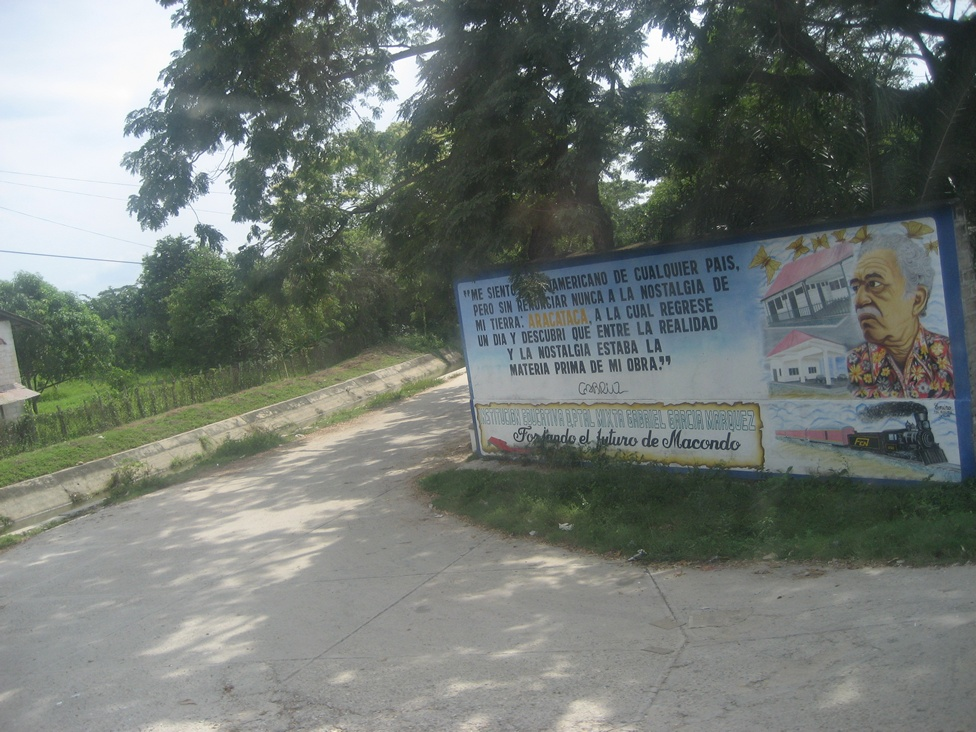
García Márquez billboard in Aracataca: "I feel Latin American from whatever country, but I have never renounced the nostalgia of my homeland: Aracataca, to which I returned one day and discovered that between reality and nostalgia was the raw material for my work". —Gabriel García Márquez

Gabriel García Márquez was born on 6 March 1928 (Note: "On Sunday 6 March 1928, at 9am, in the midst of an unseasonal rainstorm, a baby boy, Gabriel José García Márquez, was born." (Martin 2008, p. 27)) in the small town of Aracataca, in the Caribbean region of Colombia, to Gabriel Eligio García and Luisa Santiaga Márquez Iguarán. Soon after García Márquez was born, his father became a pharmacist and moved with his wife to the nearby large port city of Barranquilla, leaving young Gabriel in Aracataca. He was raised by his maternal grandparents, Doña Tranquilina Iguarán and Colonel Nicolás Ricardo Márquez Mejía. In December 1936, his father took him and his brother to Sincé. However, when his grandfather died in March 1937, the family moved first (back) to Barranquilla and then on to Sucre, where his father started a pharmacy.

When his parents had fallen in love, their relationship was met with resistance from Luisa Santiaga Márquez's father, the Colonel. Gabriel Eligio García was not the man the Colonel had envisioned winning the heart of his daughter: Gabriel Eligio was a Conservative, and had the reputation of being a womanizer. Gabriel Eligio wooed Luisa with violin serenades, love poems, countless letters, and even telephone messages after her father sent her away with the intention of separating the young couple. Her parents tried everything to get rid of the man, but he kept coming back, and it was obvious their daughter was committed to him. Her family finally capitulated and gave her permission to marry him (The tragicomic story of their courtship would later be adapted and recast as Love in the Time of Cholera.)

Since García Márquez's parents were more or less strangers to him for the first few years of his life, his grandparents influenced his early development very strongly. His grandfather, whom he called "Papalelo", was a Liberal veteran of the Thousand Days War. The Colonel was considered a hero by Colombian Liberals and was highly respected. He was well known for his refusal to remain silent about the banana massacres that took place the year after García Márquez was born. The Colonel, whom García Márquez described as his "umbilical cord with history and reality", was also an excellent storyteller. He taught García Márquez lessons from the dictionary, took him to the circus each year, and was the first to introduce his grandson to ice—a "miracle" found at the United Fruit Company store. He would also occasionally tell his young grandson "You can't imagine how much a dead man weighs", reminding him that there was no greater burden than to have killed a man, a lesson that García Márquez would later integrate into his novels.

García Márquez's grandmother, Doña Tranquilina Iguarán Cotes, played an important and influential role in his upbringing. He was inspired by the way she "treated the extraordinary as something perfectly natural." The house was filled with stories of ghosts and premonitions, omens and portents, all of which were studiously ignored by her husband. According to García Márquez, she was "the source of the magical, superstitious and supernatural view of reality". He enjoyed his grandmother's unique way of telling stories. No matter how fantastic or improbable her statements, she always delivered them as if they were the irrefutable truth. It was a deadpan style that, some thirty years later, heavily influenced her grandson's most popular novel, One Hundred Years of Solitude.

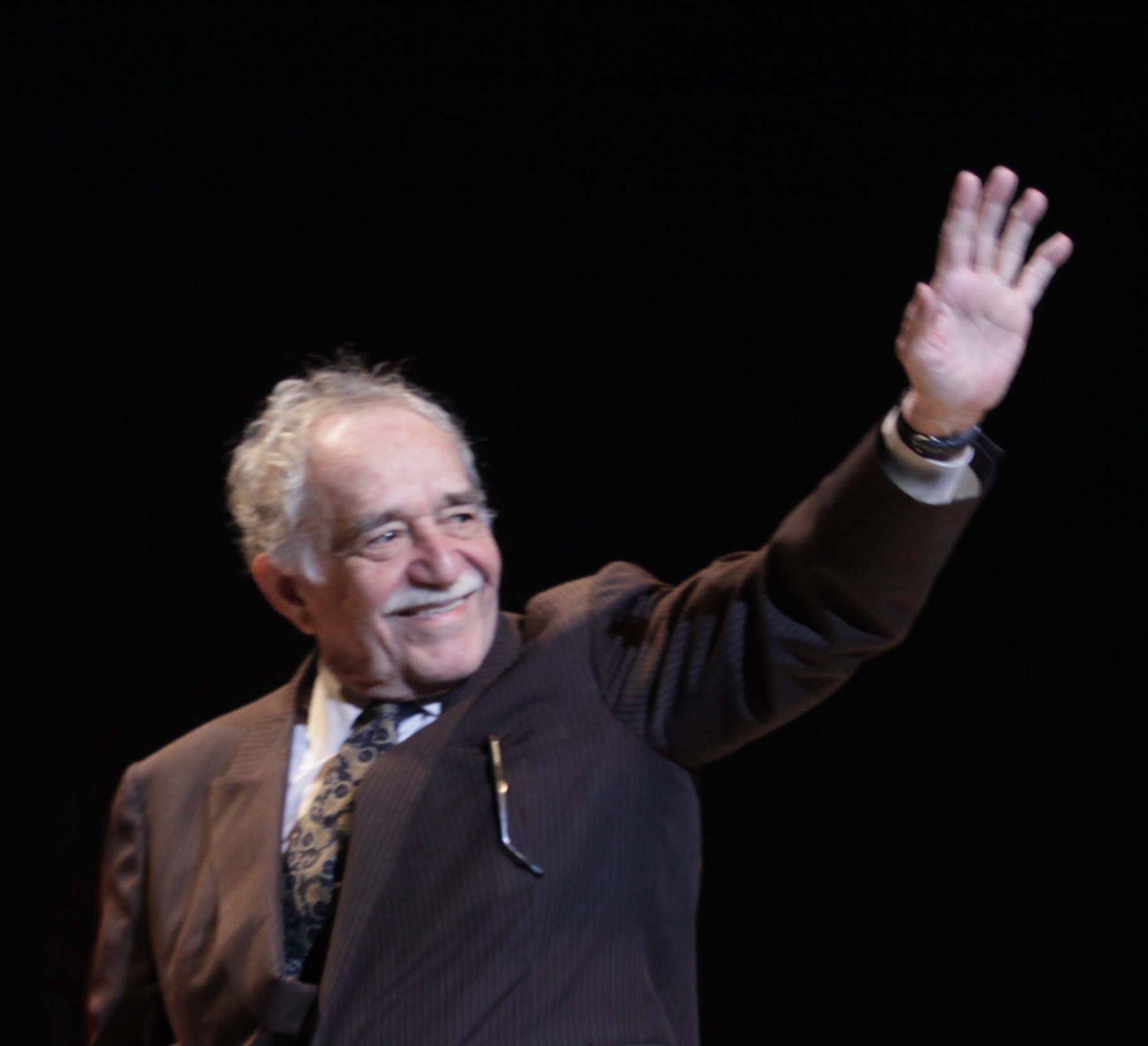
García Márquez in 2009

==== Education and adulthood ====
After arriving at Sucre, it was decided that García Márquez should start his formal education and he was sent to an internship in Barranquilla, a port on the mouth of the Río Magdalena. There, he gained a reputation of being a timid boy who wrote humorous poems and drew humorous comic strips. Serious and little interested in athletic activities, he was called El Viejo by his classmates. He attended a Jesuit college to study law. After his graduation in 1947, García Márquez stayed in Bogotá to study law at the Universidad Nacional de Colombia, but spent most of his spare time reading fiction. He was inspired by The Metamorphosis by Franz Kafka, at the time incorrectly thought to have been translated by Jorge Luis Borges. His first published work, "La tercera resignación", appeared in the 13 September 1947 edition of the newspaper El Espectador. From 1947 to 1955, he wrote a series of short stories that were later published under the title of "Eyes of a Blue Dog".

Though his passion was writing, he continued with law in 1948 to please his father. After the Bogotazo riots on 9 April following the assassination of a popular leader Jorge Eliécer Gaitán, the university closed indefinitely and his boarding house was burned. García Márquez transferred to the Universidad de Cartagena and began working as a reporter of El Universal. In 1950, he ended his legal studies to focus on journalism and moved again to Barranquilla to work as a columnist and reporter in the newspaper El Heraldo. Universities, including Columbia University in the City of New York, have given him an honorary doctorate in writing.

=== Journalism ===
García Márquez began his career as a journalist while studying law at the National University of Colombia. In 1948 and 1949, he wrote for El Universal in Cartagena. From 1950 until 1952, he wrote a "whimsical" column under the name of "Septimus" for the local paper El Heraldo in Barranquilla. García Márquez noted of his time at El Heraldo, "I'd write a piece and they'd pay me three pesos for it, and maybe an editorial for another three." During this time he became an active member of the informal group of writers and journalists known as the Barranquilla Group, an association that provided great motivation and inspiration for his literary career. He worked with inspirational figures such as Ramon Vinyes, whom García Márquez depicted as an Old Catalan who owns a bookstore in One Hundred Years of Solitude. At this time, García Márquez was also introduced to the works of writers such as Virginia Woolf and William Faulkner. Faulkner's narrative techniques, historical themes and use of rural locations influenced many Latin American authors. From 1954 to 1955, García Márquez spent time in Bogotá and regularly wrote for Bogotá's El Espectador. From 1956, he spent two years in Europe, returning to marry Mercedes Barcha in Barranquilla in 1958, and to work on magazines in Caracas, Venezuela.

=== Politics ===
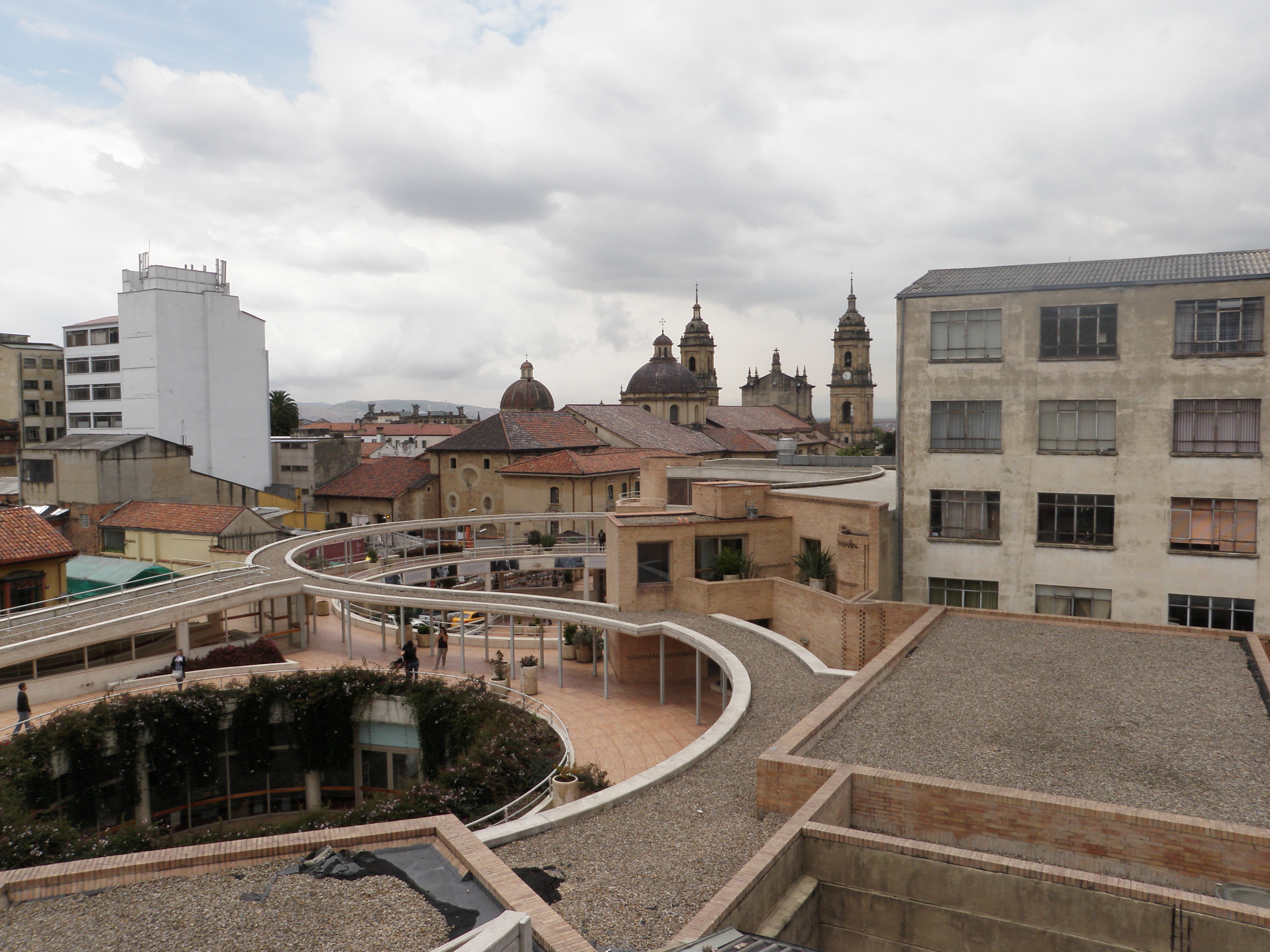
The Gabriel García Márquez Cultural Center in Bogotá, Colombia.

García Márquez was a "committed leftist" throughout his life, adhering to socialist beliefs. In 1991, he published Changing the History of Africa, an admiring study of Cuban activities in the Angolan Civil War and the larger South African Border War. He maintained a close but "nuanced" friendship with Fidel Castro, praising the achievements of the Cuban Revolution but criticizing aspects of governance and working to "soften [the] roughest edges" of the country. García Márquez's political and ideological views were shaped by his grandfather's stories. In an interview, García Márquez told his friend Plinio Apuleyo Mendoza, "my grandfather the Colonel was a Liberal. My political ideas probably came from him to begin with because, instead of telling me fairy tales when I was young, he would regale me with horrifying accounts of the last civil war that free-thinkers and anti-clerics waged against the Conservative government." This influenced his political views and his literary technique so that "in the same way that his writing career initially took shape in conscious opposition to the Colombian literary status quo, García Márquez's socialist and anti-imperialist views are in principled opposition to the global status quo dominated by the United States."

==== The Story of a Shipwrecked Sailor ====
Ending in controversy, his last domestically written editorial for El Espectador was a 1955 series of 14 news articles in which he revealed the hidden story of how a Colombian Navy vessel's shipwreck "occurred because the boat contained a badly stowed cargo of contraband goods that broke loose on the deck." García Márquez compiled this story through interviews with a young sailor who survived the wreck. In response to this controversy, El Espectador sent García Márquez away to Europe to be a foreign correspondent. He wrote about his experiences for El Independiente, a newspaper that briefly replaced El Espectador during the military government of General Gustavo Rojas Pinilla and was later shut down by Colombian authorities. García Márquez's background in journalism provided a foundational base for his writing career. Literary critic Bell-Villada noted, "Owing to his hands-on experiences in journalism, García Márquez is, of all the great living authors, the one who is closest to everyday reality."

=== QAP ===
García Márquez was one of the original founders of QAP, a Colombian newscast that aired between 1992 and 1997. He was attracted to the project by the promise of editorial and journalistic independence.

=== Marriage and family ===
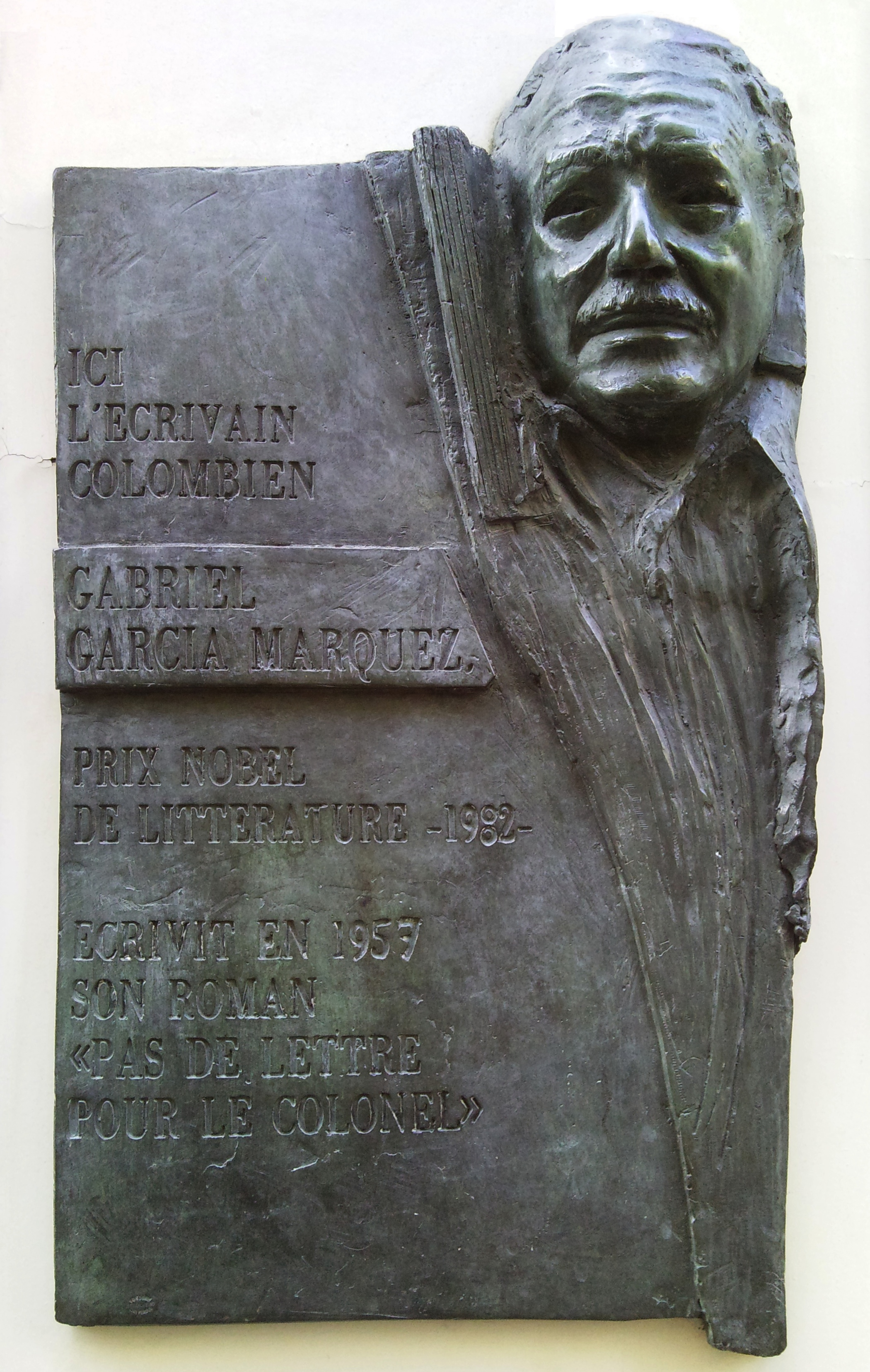
Commemorative plaque at the Hotel des Trois Collèges in Paris (France), where García Márquez lived in 1956

García Márquez met Mercedes Barcha while she was at school; he was 14 and she was 9. When he was sent to Europe as a foreign correspondent, Mercedes waited for him to return to Barranquilla. Finally, they married in 1958. The following year, their first son, Rodrigo García, now a television and film director, was born. In 1961, the family traveled by Greyhound bus throughout the southern United States and eventually settled in Mexico City. García Márquez had always wanted to see the Southern United States because it inspired the writings of William Faulkner. Three years later, the couple's second son, Gonzalo García, was born in Mexico. As of 2001, Gonzalo is a graphic designer in Mexico City.

In January 2022, it was reported that García Márquez had a daughter, Indira Cato, from an extramarital affair with Mexican writer Susana Cato in the early 1990s. Indira is a documentary producer in Mexico City.

=== Leaf Storm ===
Leaf Storm (La Hojarasca) is García Márquez's first novella and took seven years to find a publisher, finally being published in 1955. García Márquez notes that "of all that he had written (as of 1973), Leaf Storm was his favorite because he felt that it was the most sincere and spontaneous." All the events of the novella take place in one room, during a half-hour period on Wednesday 12 September 1928. It is the story of an old colonel (similar to García Márquez's own grandfather) who tries to give a proper Christian burial to an unpopular French doctor. The colonel is supported only by his daughter and grandson. The novella explores the child's first experience with death by following his stream of consciousness. The book reveals the perspective of Isabel, the Colonel's daughter, which provides a feminine point of view.

=== In Evil Hour ===
In Evil Hour (La mala hora), García Márquez's second novel, was published in 1962. Its formal structure is based on novels such as Virginia Woolf's Mrs Dalloway. The narrative begins on the saint's day of St Francis of Assisi, but the murders that follow are far from the saint's message of peace. The story interweaves characters and details from García Márquez's other writings such as Artificial Roses, and comments on literary genres such as whodunnit detective stories. Some of the characters and situations found in In Evil Hour re-appear in One Hundred Years of Solitude.

=== One Hundred Years of Solitude ===
From when he was 18, García Márquez had wanted to write a novel based on his grandparents' house where he grew up. However, he struggled with finding an appropriate tone and put off the idea until one day the answer hit him while driving his family to Acapulco. He turned the car around and the family returned home so he could begin writing. He sold his car so his family would have money to live on while he wrote. Writing the novel took far longer than he expected; he wrote every day for 18 months. His wife had to ask for food on credit from their butcher and baker as well as nine months of rent on credit from their landlord. During the 18 months of writing, García Márquez met with two couples, Eran Carmen and Álvaro Mutis, and María Luisa Elío and Jomí García Ascot, every night and discussed the progress of the novel, trying out different versions. When the book was published in 1967, it became his most commercially successful novel, One Hundred Years of Solitude (Cien años de soledad; English translation by Gregory Rabassa, 1970), selling over 50 million copies. The book was dedicated to Jomí García Ascot and María Luisa Elío. The story chronicles several generations of the Buendía family from the time they founded the fictional South American village of Macondo, through their trials and tribulations, and instances of incest, births, and deaths. The history of Macondo is often generalized by critics to represent rural towns throughout Latin America or at least near García Márquez's native Aracataca.

The novel was widely popular and led to García Márquez's Nobel Prize as well as the Rómulo Gallegos Prize in 1972. He was awarded the Nobel Prize for Literature in 1982. William Kennedy has called it "the first piece of literature since the Book of Genesis that should be required reading for the entire human race," and hundreds of articles and books of literary critique have been published in response to it. Despite the many accolades the book received, García Márquez tended to downplay its success. He once remarked: "Most critics don't realize that a novel like One Hundred Years of Solitude is a bit of a joke, full of signals to close friends, and so, with some pre-ordained right to pontificate they take on the responsibility of decoding the book and risk making terrible fools of themselves."

=== Fame ===
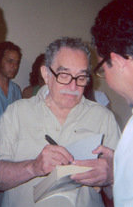
García Márquez signing a copy of One Hundred Years of Solitude in Havana, Cuba

After writing One Hundred Years of Solitude García Márquez returned to Europe, this time bringing along his family, to live in Barcelona, Spain, for seven years. The international recognition García Márquez earned with the publication of the novel led to his ability to act as a facilitator in several negotiations between the Colombian government and the guerrillas, including the former 19th of April Movement (M-19), and the current FARC and ELN organizations. The popularity of his writing also led to friendships with powerful leaders, including one with former Cuban president Fidel Castro, which has been analyzed in Gabo and Fidel: Portrait of a Friendship. It was during this time that he was punched in the face by Mario Vargas Llosa in what became one of the largest feuds in modern literature. In an interview with Claudia Dreifus in 1982 García Márquez noted his relationship with Castro was mostly based on literature: "Ours is an intellectual friendship. It may not be widely known that Fidel is a very cultured man. When we're together, we talk a great deal about literature." This relationship was criticized by Cuban exile writer Reinaldo Arenas, in his 1992 memoir Antes de que Anochezca (Before Night Falls).

Due to his newfound fame and his outspoken views on US imperialism, García Márquez was labeled as a subversive and for many years was denied visas by US immigration authorities. After Bill Clinton was elected US President, he lifted the travel ban and cited One Hundred Years of Solitude as his favorite novel.

=== Autumn of the Patriarch ===
García Márquez was inspired to write a dictator novel when he witnessed the flight of Venezuelan dictator Marcos Pérez Jiménez. He said, "it was the first time we had seen a dictator fall in Latin America." García Márquez began writing Autumn of the Patriarch (El otoño del patriarca) in 1968 and said it was finished in 1971; however, he continued to embellish the dictator novel until 1975 when it was published in Spain. According to García Márquez, the novel is a "poem on the solitude of power" as it follows the life of an eternal dictator known as the General. The novel is developed through a series of anecdotes related to the life of the General, which do not appear in chronological order. Although the exact location of the story is not pin-pointed in the novel, the imaginary country is situated somewhere in the Caribbean.

García Márquez gave his own explanation of the plot:

My intention was always to make a synthesis of all the Latin American dictators, but especially those from the Caribbean. Nevertheless, the personality of Juan Vicente Gomez [of Venezuela] was so strong, in addition to the fact that he exercised a special fascination over me, that undoubtedly the Patriarch has much more of him than anyone else.

After Autumn of the Patriarch was published García Márquez and his family moved from Barcelona to Mexico City and García Márquez pledged not to publish again until the Chilean Dictator Augusto Pinochet was deposed. All the same, he published Chronicle of a Death Foretold while Pinochet was still in power, as he "could not remain silent in the face of injustice and repression."

=== The Incredible and Sad Tale of Innocent Eréndira and Her Heartless Grandmother ===
The Incredible and Sad Tale of Innocent Eréndira and Her Heartless Grandmother (Spanish: La increíble y triste historia de la cándida Eréndira y de su abuela desalmada) presents the story of a young mulatto girl who dreams of freedom, but cannot escape the reach of her avaricious grandmother. Eréndira and her grandmother make an appearance in an earlier novel, One Hundred Years of Solitude.

The Incredible and Sad Tale of Innocent Eréndira and Her Heartless Grandmother was published in 1972. The novella was adapted to the 1983 art film Eréndira, directed by Ruy Guerra.

=== Chronicle of a Death Foretold ===
Chronicle of a Death Foretold (Crónica de una muerte anunciada), which literary critic Ruben Pelayo called a combination of journalism, realism and detective story, is inspired by a real-life murder that took place in Sucre, Colombia, in 1951, but García Márquez maintained that nothing of the actual events remains beyond the point of departure and the structure. The character of Santiago Nasar is based on a good friend from García Márquez's childhood, Cayetano Gentile Chimento.

The plot of the novel revolves around Santiago Nasar's murder. The narrator acts as a detective, uncovering the events of the murder as the novel proceeds. Pelayo notes that the story "unfolds in an inverted fashion. Instead of moving forward... the plot moves backward."

Chronicle of a Death Foretold was published in 1981, the year before García Márquez was awarded the 1982 Nobel Prize in Literature. The novel was also adapted into a film by Italian director Francesco Rosi in 1987.

=== Love in the Time of Cholera ===
Love in the Time of Cholera (El amor en los tiempos del cólera) was first published in 1985. It is considered a non-traditional love story as "lovers find love in their 'golden years'—in their seventies, when death is all around them".

Love in the Time of Cholera is based on the stories of two couples. The young love of Fermina Daza and Florentino Ariza is based on the love affair of García Márquez's parents. But as García Márquez explained in an interview: "The only difference is [my parents] married. And as soon as they were married, they were no longer interesting as literary figures." The love of old people is based on a newspaper story about the death of two Americans, who were almost 80 years old, who met every year in Acapulco. They were out in a boat one day and were murdered by the boatman with his oars. García Márquez notes, "Through their death, the story of their secret romance became known. I was fascinated by them. They were each married to other people."

=== News of a Kidnapping ===
News of a Kidnapping (Noticia de un secuestro) was first published in 1996. It examines a series of related kidnappings and narcoterrorist actions committed in the early 1990s in Colombia by the Medellín Cartel, a drug cartel founded and operated by Pablo Escobar. The text recounts the kidnapping, imprisonment, and eventual release of prominent figures in Colombia, including politicians and members of the press. The original idea was proposed to García Márquez by the former minister for education Maruja Pachón Castro and Colombian diplomat Luis Alberto Villamizar Cárdenas, both of whom were among the many victims of Pablo Escobar's attempt to pressure the government to stop his extradition by committing a series of kidnappings, murders and terrorist actions.

=== Living to Tell the Tale and Memories of My Melancholy Whores ===
In 2002 García Márquez published the memoir Vivir para contarla, the first of a projected three-volume autobiography. Edith Grossman's English translation, Living to Tell the Tale, was published in November 2003. October 2004 brought the publication of a novel, Memories of My Melancholy Whores (Memoria de mis putas tristes), a love story that follows the romance of a 90-year-old man and a child forced into prostitution. Memories of My Melancholy Whores caused controversy in Iran, where it was banned after an initial 5,000 copies were printed and sold.

=== Film and opera ===
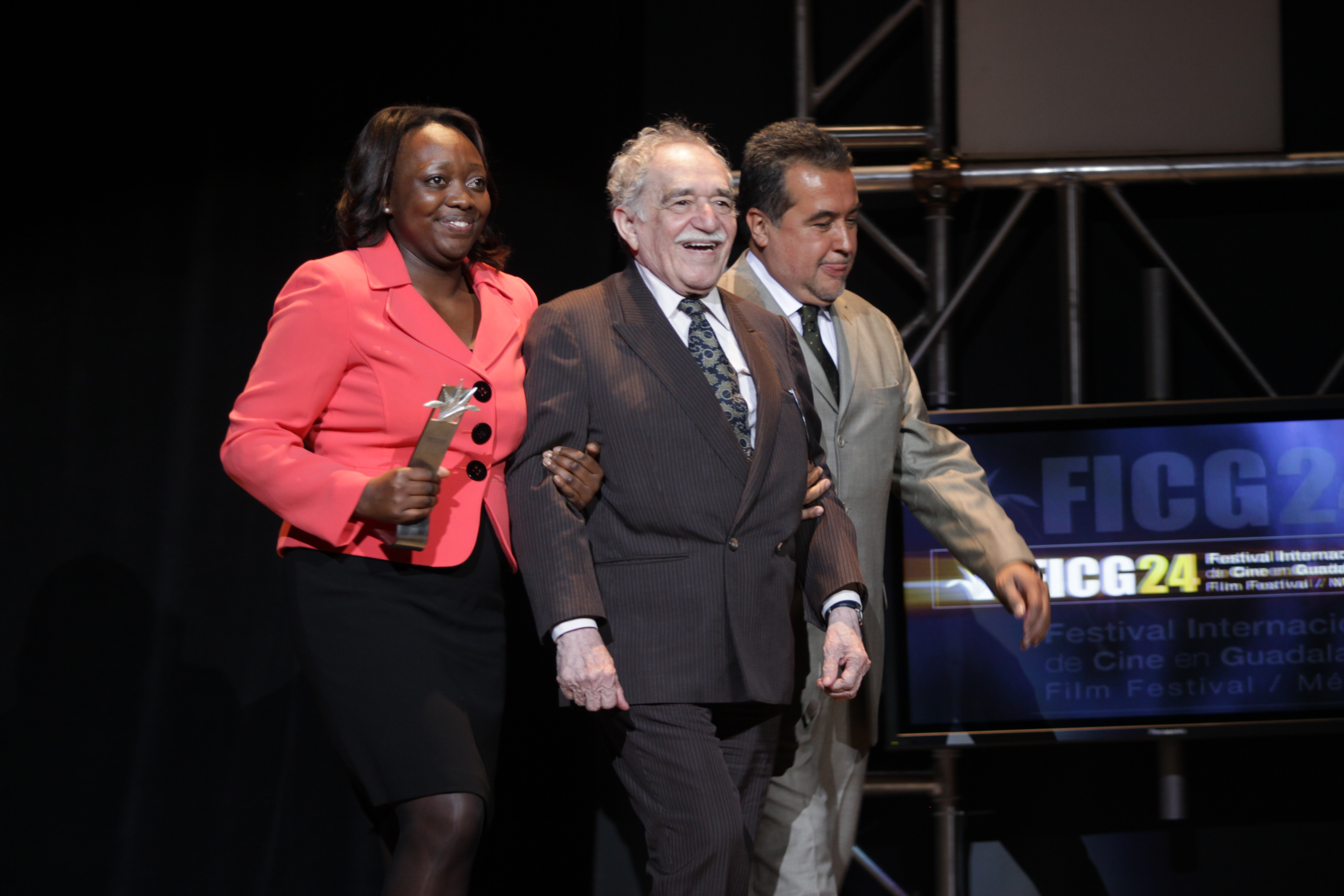
García Márquez with the Colombian Culture Minister Paula Moreno (left) at the Guadalajara International Film Festival, in Guadalajara, Mexico (March 2009)

Critics often describe the language that García Márquez's imagination produces as visual or graphic, and he himself explains each of his stories is inspired by "a visual image," so it comes as no surprise that he had a long and involved history with film. He was a film critic, he founded and served as executive director of the Film Institute in Havana, was the head of the Latin American Film Foundation, and wrote several screenplays. For his first script he worked with Carlos Fuentes on Juan Rulfo's El gallo de oro. His other screenplays include the films Tiempo de morir (1966), (1985) and Un señor muy viejo con unas alas enormes (1988), as well as the television series Amores difíciles (1991).

García Márquez originally wrote his Eréndira as a third screenplay, but this version was lost and replaced by the novella. Nonetheless, he worked on rewriting the script in collaboration with Ruy Guerra, and the film was released in Mexico in 1983.

Several of his stories have inspired other writers and directors. In 1987, the Italian director Francesco Rosi directed the movie Cronaca di una morte annunciata based on Chronicle of a Death Foretold. Several film adaptations have been made in Mexico, including Miguel Littín's La Viuda de Montiel (1979), Jaime Humberto Hermosillo's Maria de mi corazón (1979), and Arturo Ripstein's El coronel no tiene quien le escriba (1998).

British director Mike Newell (Four Weddings and a Funeral) filmed Love in the Time of Cholera in Cartagena, Colombia, with the screenplay written by Ronald Harwood (The Pianist). The film was released in the U.S. on 16 November 2007.

=== Later life and death ===
==== Declining health ====
In 1999 García Márquez was misdiagnosed with pneumonia instead of lymphatic cancer. Chemotherapy at a hospital in Los Angeles proved to be successful, and the illness went into remission. This event prompted García Márquez to begin writing his memoirs: "I reduced relations with my friends to a minimum, disconnected the telephone, canceled the trips and all sorts of current and future plans", he told El Tiempo, the Colombian newspaper, "and locked myself in to write every day without interruption." In 2002, three years later, he published Living to Tell the Tale (Vivir para Contarla), the first volume in a projected trilogy of memoirs.

In 2000 his impending death was incorrectly reported by Peruvian daily newspaper La República. The next day other newspapers republished his alleged farewell poem, "La Marioneta," but shortly afterward García Márquez denied being the author of the poem, which was determined to be the work of a Mexican ventriloquist.

He stated that 2005 "was the first [year] in my life in which I haven't written even a line. With my experience, I could write a new novel without any problems, but people would realise my heart wasn't in it."

In May 2008 it was announced that García Márquez was finishing a new "novel of love" that had yet to be given a title, to be published by the end of the year. However, in April 2009 his agent, Carmen Balcells, told the Chilean newspaper La Tercera that García Márquez was unlikely to write again. This was disputed by Random House Mondadori editor Cristobal Pera, who stated that García Márquez was completing a new novel whose Spanish title was to be En agosto nos vemos (lit. transl. We'll Meet in August). In 2023 it was announced that the novel, whose English title was to be Until August, would be released posthumously in 2024. The book was published posthumously on the 97th anniversary of his birth, 6 March 2024, against Márquez's own wishes that the manuscript be destroyed after his death.

In December 2008 García Márquez told fans at the Guadalajara book fair that writing had worn him out. In 2009, responding to claims by both his literary agent and his biographer that his writing career was over, he told Colombian newspaper El Tiempo: "Not only is it not true, but the only thing I do is write".

In 2012 his brother Jaime announced that García Márquez was suffering from dementia.

In April 2014, García Márquez was hospitalized in Mexico. He had infections in his lungs and his urinary tract, and was suffering from dehydration. He was responding well to antibiotics. Mexican president Enrique Peña Nieto wrote on Twitter, "I wish him a speedy recovery". Colombian president Juan Manuel Santos said his country was thinking of the author and said in a tweet: "All of Colombia wishes a speedy recovery to the greatest of all time: Gabriel García Márquez."

==== Death ====
García Márquez died of pneumonia at the age of 87 on 17 April 2014, in Mexico City. His death was confirmed by Fernanda Familiar on Twitter, and by his former editor Cristóbal Pera.

The Colombian president Juan Manuel Santos mentioned: "One Hundred Years of Solitude and sadness for the death of the greatest Colombian of all time". The former Colombian president Álvaro Uribe Vélez said: "Master García Márquez, thanks forever, millions of people in the planet fell in love with our nation fascinated with your lines." At the time of his death, García Márquez had a wife and two sons.

García Márquez was cremated at a private family ceremony in Mexico City. On 22 April the presidents of Colombia and Mexico attended a formal ceremony in Mexico City, where García Márquez had lived for more than three decades. A funeral cortege took the urn containing his ashes from his house to the Palacio de Bellas Artes, where the memorial ceremony was held. Earlier, residents in his home town of Aracataca in Colombia's Caribbean region held a symbolic funeral. In February 2015, the heirs of Gabriel García Márquez deposited a legacy of the writer in his Memoriam in the Caja de las Letras of the Instituto Cervantes.

== Style ==
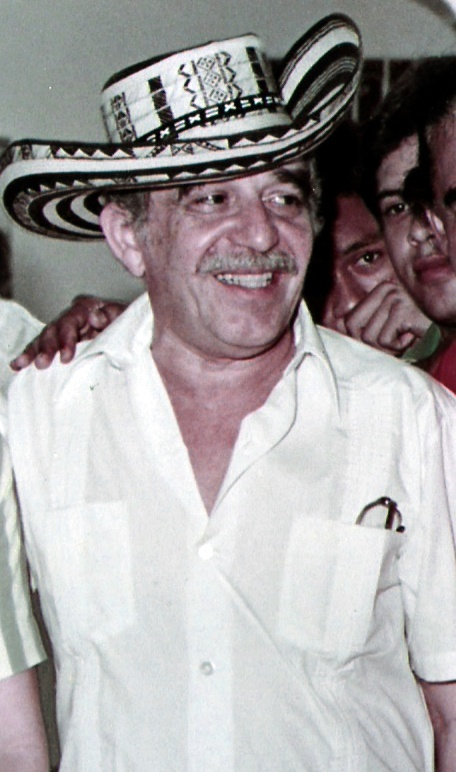
"Gabo" wearing a "sombrero vueltiao" hat, typical of the Colombian Caribbean region. Most of the stories by García Márquez revolve around the idiosyncrasy of this region.

In every book I try to make a different path ... . One doesn't choose the style. You can investigate and try to discover what the best style would be for a theme. But the style is determined by the subject, by the mood of the times. If you try to use something that is not suitable, it just won't work. Then the critics build theories around that and they see things I hadn't seen. I only respond to our way of life, the life of the Caribbean.

García Márquez was noted for leaving out seemingly important details and events so the reader is forced into a more participatory role in the story development. For example, in No One Writes to the Colonel, the main characters are not given names. This practice is influenced by Greek tragedies, such as Antigone and Oedipus Rex, in which important events occur off-stage and are left to the audience's imagination.

=== Realism and magical realism ===
Reality is an important theme in all of García Márquez's works. He said of his early works (with the exception of Leaf Storm), "Nobody Writes to the Colonel, In Evil Hour, and Big Mama's Funeral all reflect the reality of life in Colombia and this theme determines the rational structure of the books. I don't regret having written them, but they belong to a kind of premeditated literature that offers too static and exclusive a vision of reality."

In his other works he experimented more with less traditional approaches to reality, so that "the most frightful, the most unusual things are told with the deadpan expression". A commonly cited example is the physical and spiritual ascending into heaven of Remedios the Beauty while she is hanging the laundry out to dry in One Hundred Years of Solitude. The style of these works fits in the "marvellous realm" described by the Cuban writer Alejo Carpentier and was labeled as magical realism. Literary critic Michael Bell proposes an alternative understanding for García Márquez's style, as the category magic realism is criticized for being dichotomizing and exoticizing, "what is really at stake is a psychological suppleness which is able to inhabit unsentimentally the daytime world while remaining open to the promptings of those domains which modern culture has, by its own inner logic, necessarily marginalised or repressed." García Márquez and his friend Plinio Apuleyo Mendoza discuss his work in a similar way,

The way you treat reality in your books ... has been called magical realism. I have the feeling your European readers are usually aware of the magic of your stories but fail to see the reality behind it .... This is surely because their rationalism prevents them seeing that reality isn't limited to the price of tomatoes and eggs.

== Themes ==
=== Solitude ===
The theme of solitude runs through much of García Márquez's works. As Pelayo notes, "Love in the Time of Cholera, like all of Gabriel García Márquez's work, explores the solitude of the individual and of humankind...portrayed through the solitude of love and of being in love".

In response to Plinio Apuleyo Mendoza's question, "If solitude is the theme of all your books, where should we look for the roots of this over-riding emotion? In your childhood perhaps?" García Márquez replied, "I think it's a problem everybody has. Everyone has his own way and means of expressing it. The feeling pervades the work of so many writers, although some of them may express it unconsciously."

In his Nobel Prize acceptance speech, Solitude of Latin America, he relates this theme of solitude to the Latin American experience, "The interpretation of our reality through patterns not our own, serves only to make us ever more unknown, ever less free, ever more solitary."

=== Macondo ===
Another important theme in many of García Márquez's work is the setting of the village he calls Macondo. He uses his home town of Aracataca, Colombia as a cultural, historical and geographical reference to create this imaginary town, but the representation of the village is not limited to this specific area. García Márquez shares, "Macondo is not so much a place as a state of mind, which allows you to see what you want, and how you want to see it." Even when his stories do not take place in Macondo, there is often still a consistent lack of specificity to the location. So while they are often set with "a Caribbean coastline and an Andean hinterland... [the settings are] otherwise unspecified, in accordance with García Márquez's evident attempt to capture a more general regional myth rather than give a specific political analysis." This fictional town has become well known in the literary world. As Stavans notes of Macondo, "its geography and inhabitants constantly invoked by teachers, politicians, and tourist agents..." makes it "...hard to believe it is a sheer fabrication." In Leaf Storm García Márquez depicts the realities of the Banana Boom in Macondo, which include a period of great wealth during the presence of the US companies and a period of depression upon the departure of the American banana companies. One Hundred Years of Solitude takes place in Macondo and tells the complete history of the fictional town from its founding to its doom. The account of Macondo in "The Handsomest Drowned Man in the World" has been compared by Constance Pedoto to tales from Alaska which combine the real and the surreal, deriving from an upbringing which combined superstitious beliefs and a harsh environment.

In his autobiography, García Márquez explains his fascination with the word and concept Macondo. He describes a trip he made with his mother back to Aracataca as a young man:

The train stopped at a station that had no town, and a short while later it passed the only banana plantation along the route that had its name written over the gate: Macondo. This word had attracted my attention ever since the first trips I had made with my grandfather, but I discovered only as an adult that I liked its poetic resonance. I never heard anyone say it and did not even ask myself what it meant...I happened to read in an encyclopedia that it is a tropical tree resembling the Ceiba.

=== La Violencia ===
In several of García Márquez's works, including No One Writes to the Colonel, In Evil Hour, and Leaf Storm, he referenced La Violencia (the violence), "a brutal civil war between conservatives and liberals that lasted into the 1960s, causing the deaths of several hundred thousand Colombians". Throughout all of his novels there are subtle references to la violencia. For example, characters live under various unjust situations like curfew, press censorship, and underground newspapers. In Evil Hour, while not one of García Márquez's most famous novels, is notable for its portrayal of la violencia with its "fragmented portrayal of social disintegration provoked by la violencia". Although García Márquez did portray the corrupt nature and the injustices of times like la violencia, he refused to use his work as a platform for political propaganda. "For him, the duty of the revolutionary writer is to write well, and the ideal novel is one that moves its reader by its political and social content, and, at the same time, by its power to penetrate reality and expose its other side.

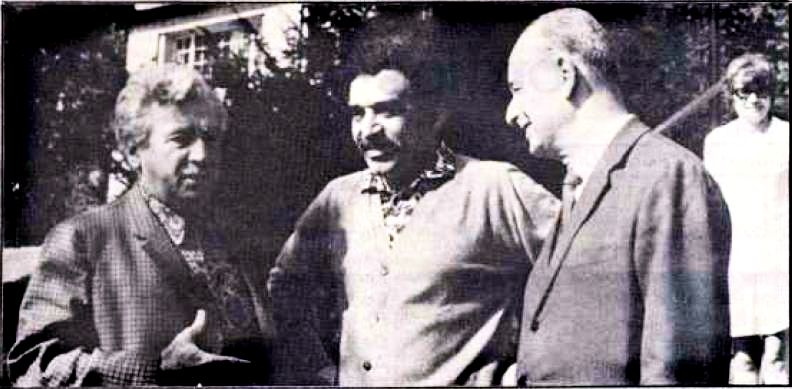
García Márquez (center) with Jorge Amado (to his left) and Adonias Filho (to his right)

== Legacy ==
Whether in fiction or nonfiction, in the epic novel or the concentrated story, Márquez is now recognized in the words of Carlos Fuentes as "the most popular and perhaps the best writer in Spanish since Cervantes". He is one of those very rare artists who succeed in chronicling not only a nation's life, culture and history, but also those of an entire continent, and a master storyteller who, as The New York Review of Books once said, "forces upon us at every page the wonder and extravagance of life."

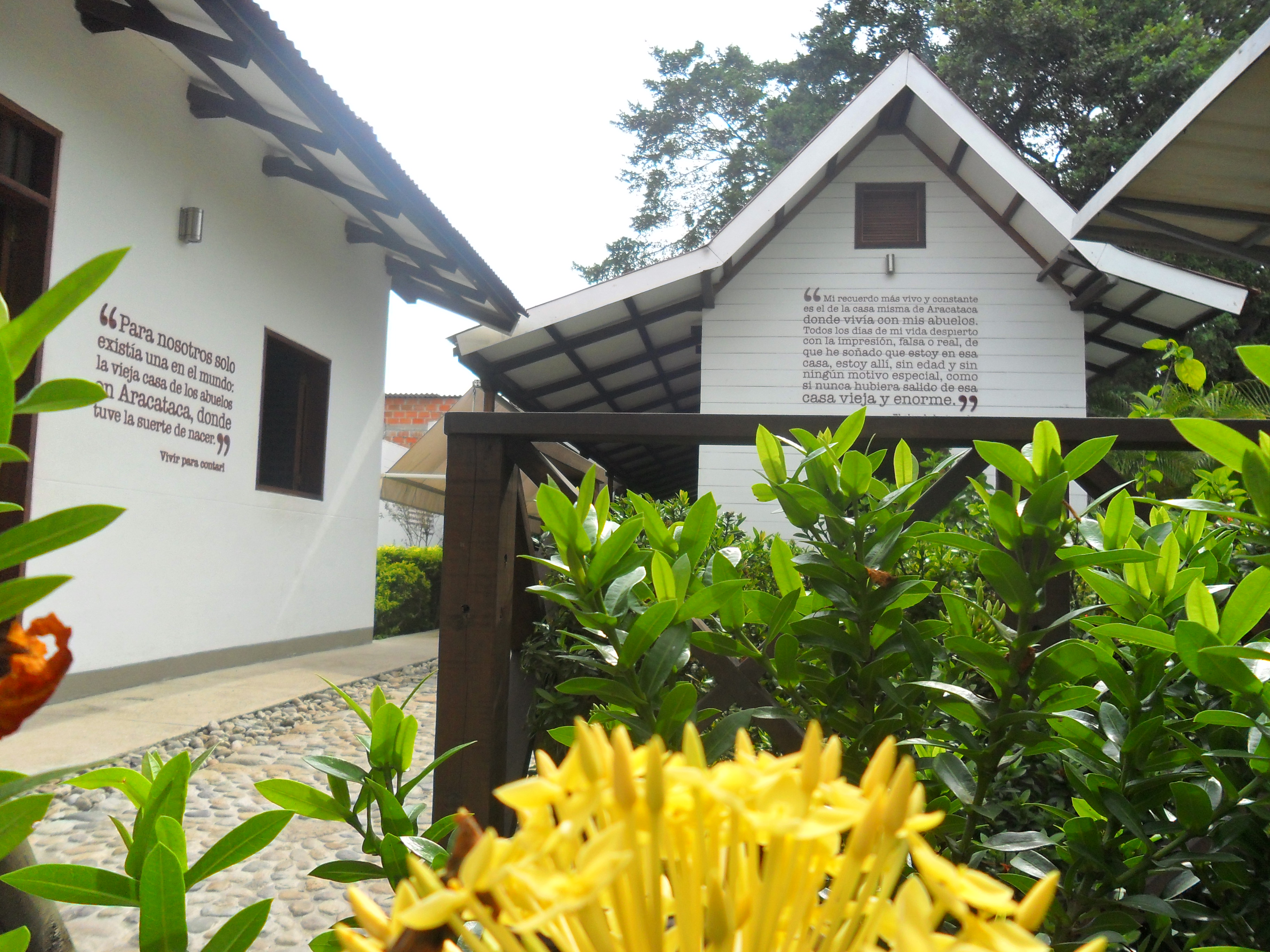
Gabriel García Márquez House Museum in Aracataca, Colombia.

García Márquez's work is an important part of the Latin American Boom of literature, often defined around his works, and those of Julio Cortázar, Carlos Fuentes, and Mario Vargas Llosa. His work has challenged critics of Colombian literature to step out of the conservative criticism that had been dominant before the success of One Hundred Years of Solitude. In a review of literary criticism Robert Sims notes,

García Márquez continues to cast a lengthy shadow in Colombia, Latin America, and the United States. Critical works on the 1982 Nobel laureate have reached industrial proportion and show no signs of abating. Moreover, García Márquez has galvanized Colombian literature in an unprecedented way by giving a tremendous impetus to Colombian literature. Indeed, he has become a touchstone for literature and criticism throughout the Americas as his work has created a certain attraction-repulsion among critics and writers while readers continue to devour new publications. No one can deny that García Márquez has helped rejuvenate, reformulate, and recontextualize literature and criticism in Colombia and the rest of Latin America.

Following his death, García Márquez's family made the decision to deposit his papers and some of his personal effects at The University of Texas at Austin's Harry Ransom Center, a humanities research library and museum.

In 2023, García Márquez surpassed Miguel de Cervantes as the most translated Spanish-language writer according to the World Translation Map. The ranking is based on works translated into 10 languages, including English, Arabic, Chinese, French, German, Italian, Japanese, Portuguese, Russian and Swedish. García Márquez is also the most translated Spanish-language author between 2000–2021 ahead of Mario Vargas Llosa, Isabel Allende, Jorge Luis Borges, Carlos Ruiz Zafon, Roberto Bolaño, Cervantes and more.

=== Nobel Prize ===
García Márquez received the Nobel Prize in Literature on 10 December 1982 "for his novels and short stories, in which the fantastic and the realistic are combined in a richly composed world of imagination, reflecting a continent's life and conflicts". His acceptance speech was entitled "The Solitude of Latin America". García Márquez was the first Colombian and fourth Latin American to win a Nobel Prize for Literature. After becoming a Nobel laureate, García Márquez stated to a correspondent: "I have the impression that in giving me the prize, they have taken into account the literature of the sub-continent and have awarded me as a way of awarding all of this literature".

== García Márquez in fiction ==
A year after his death, García Márquez appears as a notable character in Claudia Amengual's novel Cartagena, set in Uruguay and Colombia.

In Giannina Braschi's Empire of Dreams, the protagonist Mariquita Samper shoots the narrator of the Latin American Boom, presumed by critics to be the figure of García Marquez; in Braschi's Spanglish novel Yo-Yo Boing! characters debate the importance of García Márquez and Isabel Allende during a heated dinner party scene.

== List of works ==
=== Novels ===
- In Evil Hour (1962)
- One Hundred Years of Solitude (1967)
- The Autumn of the Patriarch (1975)
- Love in the Time of Cholera (1985)
- The General in His Labyrinth (1989)
- Of Love and Other Demons (1993)
- Until August (2024)

=== Novellas ===
- Leaf Storm (1955)
- No One Writes to the Colonel (1958)
- Chronicle of a Death Foretold (1981)
- Memories of My Melancholy Whores (2004)

=== Short story collections ===
- Big Mama's Funeral (1962)
- Innocent Eréndira, and other stories (1978)
- Collected Stories (1984)
- Strange Pilgrims (1993)

=== Short stories ===
- "The Handsomest Drowned Man in the World" (1968)
- "A Very Old Man with Enormous Wings" (1968)
- "The Incredible and Sad Tale of Innocent Eréndira and Her Heartless Grandmother" (1972)
- "The General's Departure" (1990)

=== Non-fiction ===
- The Story of a Shipwrecked Sailor (1970)
- The Solitude of Latin America (1982)
- The Fragrance of Guava (1982, with Plinio Apuleyo Mendoza)
- Clandestine in Chile (1986)
- Changing the History of Africa: Angola and Namibia (1991, with David Deutschmann)
- News of a Kidnapping (1997)
- A Country for Children (1998)
- Living to Tell the Tale (2002)
- The Scandal of the Century: Selected Journalistic Writings, 1950–1984 (2019)

=== Films ===
Year	Film	Credited as	
Year	Film	director	screenWriter
1954	The Blue Lobster	Yes	Yes
1964	El Gallo de Oro		Yes
1965	Love, Love, Love (Lola de mi vida segment)		Yes
1966	Time to Die		Yes
1967	Dangerous Game		Yes
1968	4 contra el crimen		Yes
1974	Presage		Yes
1979	Mary my Dearest		Yes
1979	The Year of the Plague		Yes
1983	Eréndira		Yes
1985	(A) Time to Die		Yes
1988	A Very Old Man with Enormous Wings		Yes
1988	Fable of the Beautiful Pigeon Fancier		Yes
1989	A Happy Sunday		Yes
1989	Letters from the Park		Yes
1989	Miracle in Rome		Yes
1990	Don't Fool with Love: The Two Way Mirror		Yes
1991	La María		Yes
1992	Me alquilo para soñar		Yes
1993	Crónicas de una generación trágica		Yes
1996	Oedipus Mayor		Yes
1996	Saturday Night Thief		Yes
2001	The Invisible Children		Yes
2006	ZA 05. Lo viejo y lo nuevo		Yes
2007	Love in the Time of Cholera		Yes
2011	Lessons for a Kiss		Yes

=== Adaptations based on his works ===
- There Are No Thieves in This Village (1965, Alberto Isaac; also as actor)
- Patsy, My Love (1969, Manuel Michel, based on a non-published story)
- The Widow of Montiel (1979, Miguel Littín)
- The Sea of Lost Time (1980, Solveig Hoogesteijn)
- One Hundred Years of Solitude (1981, Shūji Terayama)
- Farewell to the Ark (1984, Shūji Terayama)
- Time to Die (1984, Jorge Alí Triana)
- Chronicle of a Death Foretold (1987, Francesco Rosi)
- The Summer of Miss Forbes (1989, Jaime Humberto Hermosillo)
- I'm the One You're Looking For (1989, Jaime Chávarri)
- Only Death Is Bound to Come (1992, Marina Tsurtsumia)
- Bloody Morning (1993, Shaohong Li)
- No One Writes to the Colonel (1999, Arturo Ripstein)
- In Evil Hour (2005, Ruy Guerra)
- Love in the Time of Cholera (2007, Mike Newell)
- Of Love and Other Demons (2009, Hilda Hidalgo)
- Memories of My Melancholy Whores (2011, Henning Carlsen)
- One Hundred Years of Solitude (2024, Netflix)

== See also ==
- Latin American Boom
- Latin American Literature
- I'm Not Here to Give a Speech
- McOndo
- Vallenato
- Biblioteca Gabriel García Márquez, library in Barcelona, declared world best library in 2023
