= Love in the Time of Cholera =

1985 novel by Gabriel García Márquez

- First edition (Colombia)
- Author: Gabriel García Márquez
- Original title: El amor en los tiempos del cólera
- Translator: Edith Grossman
- Language: Spanish
- Genre: Romance novel
- Set in: Northern Colombia, c. 1875–1924
- Publisher: Editorial Oveja Negra (Colombia); Alfred A. Knopf (US)
- Publication date: 1985
- Publication place: Colombia
- English publication date: April 1988
- Media type: Print (hardback and paperback)
- Pages: 348 pp (first English hardback edition)

Love in the Time of Cholera (Spanish: El amor en los tiempos del cólera) is a novel written in Spanish by Colombian Nobel Prize–winning author Gabriel García Márquez and published in 1985. Edith Grossman's English translation was published by Alfred A. Knopf in 1988.

== Plot summary ==
The main characters of the novel are Florentino Ariza and Fermina Daza. Florentino and Fermina fall in love in their youth. A secret relationship blossoms between the two with the help of Fermina's Aunt Escolástica. They exchange love letters. But once Fermina's father, Lorenzo Daza, finds out about the two, he demands his daughter stop seeing Florentino immediately. When she refuses, he moves with her to another city where they live with relatives of his deceased wife. Regardless of the distance, Fermina and Florentino continue to communicate via telegraph. Upon her return, Fermina suddenly comes to believe that her love with Florentino was nothing but an illusion, that they are practically strangers; she breaks off her engagement to Florentino and returns all his letters.

A young and accomplished national hero, Dr. Juvenal Urbino, meets Fermina and begins to court her. Despite her initial dislike of Urbino, Fermina gives in to her father's persuasion and the security and wealth Urbino offers, and they wed. Urbino is a physician devoted to science, modernity, and "order and progress". He is committed to the eradication of cholera and to the promotion of public works. He is a rational man whose life is organized precisely and who greatly values his importance and reputation in society. He is a herald of progress and modernization.

Even after Fermina's engagement and marriage, Florentino swore to stay faithful and wait for her; but his promiscuity gets the better of him and he has hundreds of affairs. Even with all the women he is with, he makes sure that Fermina will never find out. Meanwhile, Fermina and Urbino grow old together, going through happy years and unhappy ones and experiencing all the reality of marriage. Urbino proves in the end not to have been an entirely faithful husband, confessing one affair to Fermina many years into their marriage. Though the novel seems to suggest that Urbino's love for Fermina was never as spiritually chaste as Florentino's was, it also complicates Florentino's devotion by cataloging his many trysts as well as a few potentially genuine loves.

As an elderly man, Urbino dies in a fall. After the funeral Florentino proclaims his love for Fermina once again and tells her he has stayed faithful to her all these years. Hesitant at first because she is only recently widowed, and finding his advances untoward, Fermina comes to recognize Florentino's wisdom and maturity. She eventually gives him a second chance, and their love is allowed to blossom during their old age. They go on a steamship cruise up the river together.

== Characters ==
- Fermina Daza – Florentino Ariza's object of affection, and wife of Dr. Urbino, very beautiful and intelligent.
- Florentino Ariza – businessman who is in love with Fermina Daza.
- Dr. Juvenal Urbino – highly respected, wealthy doctor and husband of Fermina Daza.
- Lorenzo Daza – Fermina Daza's father, a mule driver; he despised Florentino and forced him to stop meeting Fermina. He is revealed to have been involved in some illicit businesses to build his fortune.
- Dr. Marco Aurelio Urbino Daza – Son of Dr. Juvenal Urbino and Fermina.
- Ofelia Urbino – Daughter of Dr. Urbino and Fermina.
- Doña Blanca de Urbino – Dr. Juvenal Urbino's mother.
- Jeremiah de Saint-Amour – The man whose planned suicide is introduced as the opening to the novel; a photographer and chess-player.
- Aunt Escolástica Daza – The woman who attempts to aid Fermina in her early romance with Florentino by delivering their letters for them. She is ultimately sent away by Lorenzo Daza in retaliation for this, which deeply affects his relationship with his daughter.
- Gala Placidia – Fermina's loyal servant in the house where she lived before marrying.
- Tránsito Ariza – Florentino's mother.
- Lotario Thugut – A german immigrant who teaches Florentino to play the violin and provides him with his first jobs.
- Hildebranda Sánchez – Fermina's cousin.
- Miss Barbara Lynch – The woman with whom Urbino confesses having had an affair, the only one during his long marriage.
- Uncle Leo XII Loayza – Florentino's paternal uncle and owner of the R.C.C., where he gives him a variety of jobs until ultimately proclaiming Florentino as his successor.
- Leona Cassiani – She starts out as the "personal assistant" to Uncle Leo XII at the R.C.C., the company which Florentino eventually controls. At one point, it is revealed that the two share a deep respect, possibly even love, for each other, but will never actually be together. She has a maternal love for him as a result of his "charity" in rescuing her from the streets and giving her a job.
- Captain Diego Samaritano – The captain of the riverboat on which Fermina and Florentino ride at the end of the novel.
- América Vicuña – The 14-year-old girl who toward the end of the novel is sent to live with the elderly Florentino; he is her guardian while she is in school. They have a sexual relationship, and after being rejected by Florentino and failing her exams, she poisons herself. Her grooming and subsequent suicide provides a counterpoint to the novel's grand romantic themes.

== Setting ==
The story occurs mainly in an unnamed port city somewhere near the Caribbean Sea and the Magdalena River in Colombia. While the city remains unnamed throughout the novel, descriptions and names of places suggest it is based on an amalgam of Cartagena and the nearby city of Barranquilla. The fictional city is divided into such sections as "The District of the Viceroys" and "The Arcade of the Scribes". The novel takes place approximately between 1880 and the early 1930s. The city's "steamy and sleepy streets, rat-infested sewers, old slave quarter, decaying colonial architecture, and multifarious inhabitants" are mentioned variously in the text and mingle in the lives of the characters.

== Major themes ==
=== Narrative as seduction ===
Some critics choose to consider Love in the Time of Cholera as a sentimental story about the enduring power of true love. Others criticize this opinion as being too simple.

This is manifested by Ariza's excessively romantic attitude toward life, and his gullibility in trying to retrieve the sunken treasure of a shipwreck. It is also made evident by the fact that society in the story believes that Fermina and Juvenal Urbino are perfectly happy in their marriage, while the reality of the situation is not so ideal. Critic Keith Booker compares Ariza's position to that of Humbert Humbert in Vladimir Nabokov's Lolita, saying that just as Nabokov's Humbert, despite being a "pervert, a rapist, and a murderer," is able to charm the reader into sympathizing with his situation with his first-person account, Márquez's Ariza is able to garner the reader's sympathy, even though the reader is reminded repeatedly of his more sinister exploits through the charming third-person narration.

=== Relationship between love and passion ===
The term cholera as it is used in Spanish, cólera, can also denote passion or human rage and ire in its feminine form. (The English adjective choleric has the same meaning.) Considering this meaning, the title is a pun: cholera as the disease, and cholera as passion, which raises the central question of the book: is love helped or hindered by extreme passion? The two men can be contrasted as the extremes of passion: one having too much, one too little; the central question of which is more conducive to love and happiness becomes the specific, personal choice that Fermina faces through her life. Florentino's passionate pursuit of nearly countless women stands in contrast to Urbino's clinical discussion of male anatomy on their wedding night. Urbino's eradication of cholera in the town takes on the additional symbolic meaning of ridding Fermina's life of rage, but also the passion. It is this second meaning to the title that manifests itself in Florentino's hatred for Urbino's marriage to Fermina, as well as in the social strife and warfare that serves as a backdrop to the entire story.

=== Aging and death ===
Jeremiah Saint-Amour's death inspires Urbino to meditate on his own death, and especially on the infirmities that precede it. It is necessary for Fermina and Florentino to transcend not only the difficulties of love but also the societal opinion that love is a young person's prerogative (not to mention the physical difficulties of love when one is older).

== Critical reception ==
The novel received critical acclaim. The literary critic Michiko Kakutani praised the book in a review for The New York Times, saying: "Instead of using myths and dreams to illuminate the imaginative life of a people as he's done so often in the past, Mr. Garcia Marquez has revealed how the extraordinary is contained in the ordinary ... The result is a rich, commodious novel, a novel whose narrative power is matched only by its generosity of vision." The writer Thomas Pynchon, also for The New York Times, argued: "This novel is also revolutionary in daring to suggest that vows of love made under a presumption of immortality – youthful idiocy, to some – may yet be honored, much later in life when we ought to know better, in the face of the undeniable. ... There is nothing I have read quite like this astonishing final chapter, symphonic, sure in its dynamics and tempo, moving like a riverboat too ... at the very best it results in works that can even return our worn souls to us, among which most certainly belongs Love in the Time of Cholera, this shining and heartbreaking novel."

== Film adaptation ==
Stone Village Pictures bought the movie rights from the author for US$3 million, and Mike Newell was chosen to direct it, with Ronald Harwood writing the script. Filming started in Cartagena, Colombia, during September 2006.

The $50 million film, the first major foreign production filmed in the scenic walled city in twenty years, was released on November 16, 2007, by New Line Cinema. On his own initiative, García Márquez persuaded singer Shakira, who is from the nearby city of Barranquilla, to provide two songs for the film.

== References in popular culture ==
In "Lisa's Rival" (The Simpsons' second episode of season 6, 1995), Marge Simpson is seen reading Love in the Time of Scurvy, a clear reference to the novel.

In the 2000 film High Fidelity, the main character, Rob (played by John Cusack) owns a record store. While recounting tales of past lovers he says: "I'm not the smartest guy in the world, but I'm certainly not the dumbest. I mean, I've read books like The Unbearable Lightness of Being and Love in the Time of Cholera, and I think I've understood them. They're about girls, right? Just kidding."

The book was a major part of the plot of the 2001 movie Serendipity, where Sara writes her number in the book in the hope that Jon (played by John Cusack) will one day find it.

At the end of Jeanine Cummins' novel American Dirt, the protagonist Lydia re-reads Amor en los tiempos del colera, first in Spanish, then again in English. The final two sentences of the novel reference the protagonist's love of the book: "No one can take this from her. This book is hers alone."

In the British sitcom Bad Education, the text is used in the after school book club Rosie Gulliver attends, and Alfie Wickers decides to join them to impress Rosie and attempts to read the book in six hours. However, he finds the book boring and gets his class to read one chapter each and bring him their versions of the summary.

In the episode "Milk" of the first season of the American sitcom How I Met Your Mother, the novel is mentioned as being the favorite of the show's protagonist, Ted Mosby. He is also shown reading the book at the Farhampton train station right before he meets the titular Mother in the finale episode "Last Forever".

In the Gossip Girl episode "New Haven Can Wait" (season 2, episode 6), Jordan, a Literature professor at Yale University, asks Nate what he thinks of the book. However, he has never read it and clearly does not understand the reference.

In the film Playing It Cool, Topher Grace plays the character Scott. Scott is a writer and is deeply moved by the book so much that he often leaves copies of the book in public places for others to find and read. He leaves a note in the book for the assumed reader explaining how this book changed his life. Chris Evans, the main character/narrator, finally picks up the book to read. After reading the book, the narrator applies it to his own life. He says that there are people in our lives that are so important, they dwarf everything else.

In the Chris Rock film Top Five, Rosario Dawson quotes the novel, saying: "Too much love is as bad for this as no love at all" when talking about her favorite authors.

In the 2014 entry to the Sims franchise, The Sims 4, an in-game book Love in the Time of Sandwiches serves as an allusion to the real world novel.

Frederick Wiseman's 2017 documentary Ex Libris: The New York Public Library includes a sequence where a book-club discuss the themes of the book.

Sales of Love in the Time of Cholera increased during the COVID-19 pandemic. The title of the 2020 television show Love in the Time of Corona is a play on the title of the novel, replacing "cholera" with a reference to the coronavirus disease that caused the ongoing pandemic.

Multiple musical artists have recorded songs with titles inspired by the book, including Danny Elfman ("Love in the Time of Covid"), AJJ ("Love in the Time of Human Papillomavirus") and Oneohtrix Point Never ("Love in the Time of Lexapro").

In episode 4 of the 2021 Korean drama My Roommate Is a Gumiho, the male lead character Shin Woo-yeo (Jang Ki-yong) references the novel by saying, "You could be Fermina Daza in someone's eyes."

In episode 3 of English Teacher, Mr. Marquez assigns his class to read the book. However, his student Kayla insists that it is too difficult for her to read a book about disease when she is struggling with her own disease (Kayla Syndrome, which she has made up for attention).

== Publication details ==
- 1985, Colombia, Spanish edition, Oveja Negra, 1985, hardback ISBN 958-06-0000-7 and paperback ISBN 958-06-0001-5 (first edition)
- 1985, Argentina, Spanish edition, Editorial Sudamericana, 1985, hardback ISBN 950-07-0321-1(E) (first Argentine edition)
- 1985, Mexico DF, Spanish edition, Editorial Diana, 1985, hardback ISBN 968-13-1547-2 (first Mexican edition: 100,000 copies)
- 1986, The Netherlands, Meulenhoff, ISBN 978902909048-3, translated into Dutch by Mariolein Sabarte Belacortu. Title: Liefde in tijden van cholera
- 1988, US, Alfred A. Knopf ISBN 0-394-56161-9, Published 1 January 1988, hardback (first English-language edition)
- 1989, US, Penguin Books ISBN 0-14-011990-6, Published 7 September 1989, paperback
- 2003, US, Vintage International ISBN 1-4000-3468-X, paperback
