= The Autumn of the Patriarch =

1975 novel by Gabriel García Márquez

- First edition (Spanish)
- Author: Gabriel García Márquez
- Original title: El otoño del patriarca
- Translator: Gregory Rabassa
- Language: Spanish
- Genre: Political novel, Dictator novel
- Publisher: Plaza & Janes (Spain)
- Publication date: 1975
- Publication place: Colombia
- Media type: Print (Hardback & Paperback)
- ISBN: 0-06-011419-3
- OCLC: 2464022
- Dewey Decimal: 863
- LC Class: PQ8180.17.A73 O813 1976
- Preceded by: One Hundred Years of Solitude (1967)
- Followed by: Love in the Time of Cholera (1985)

The Autumn of the Patriarch (original Spanish title: El otoño del patriarca) is a 1975 political novel by Gabriel García Márquez.

A "poem on the solitude of power" according to the author, the novel is a flowing tract on the life of an eternal dictator. The book is divided into six sections, each retelling the same story of the infinite power held by the archetypal Caribbean tyrant.

García Márquez based his fictional dictator on a variety of real-life leaders, including Gustavo Rojas Pinilla of his Colombian homeland, Generalissimo Francisco Franco of Spain (the novel was written in Barcelona), François Duvalier of Haiti, and Venezuela's Juan Vicente Gómez. The product is a universal story of the disastrous effects created by the concentration of power into a single man.

== Plot introduction ==
The book is written in long paragraphs with extended sentences. The general's thoughts are relayed to the reader through winding sentences which convey his desperation and loneliness alongside the atrocities and ruthless behavior that keep him in power. The first three chapters begin with an omniscient and anonymous narrator finding the corpse of the General; the beginning of the third chapter reveals that the body belonged to Patricio Aragonés, whom, due to their uncanny resemblance, the general uses to fake his own death.

One of the book's most striking aspects is its focus on the God-like status held by the protagonist and the unfathomable awe and respect with which his people regard him. Dictators and strongmen such as Franco, Somoza, and Trujillo managed to hold sway over the populations of their nations despite internal political division. García Márquez symbolizes this with the discovery of the dictator's corpse in the presidential palace.

== Allusions/references to actual history, geography and current science ==
García Márquez mocks the practice of conferring high military rank on the young heirs of autocrats and the overspending of their families and cronies. A frighteningly accurate portrait is drawn of the intelligence director who soon directs the general's every move and constructs an apparatus of terror and political repression.

This last portrait is compelling: "advisors" have often marked the corruption and descent into oppression of some of Latin America's most outstanding dictatorships. Trujillo's Dominican Republic carried out dozens of assassinations and terror campaigns against Dominican exiles under the direction of intelligence chief Johnny Abbes García.

== Popularity ==
According to research from the Spanish Book Institute, The Autumn of the Patriarch was the most popular book sold in Spain in 1975.

== See also ==
- Dictator novel
