= Gabriel García Márquez bibliography =

- Novels↙: 10
- Stories↙: 37
- Collections↙: 4
- Plays↙: 1
- Nonfiction↙: 8
- Screenplays↙: 1

The following is a list of works published by Colombian author Gabriel García Márquez, which includes short stories, novellas, novels, and collections, as well as other writings. The majority of his work deals with themes such as love, the influence of Caribbean culture, and solitude. He is one of a group of authors considered to have contributed to the recognition of Latin American literature around the world, and also as one of the founders of the magical realism genre.His contributions helped elevate Latin American literature to global prominence.

His novel One Hundred Years of Solitude is widely regarded as one of the most important works in the Spanish language. During the Fourth International Conference of the Spanish Language, held in Cartagena, Colombia, in March 2007, Apart from being his most relevant work, it is also the one that has had the greatest impact in Latin America. Other notable works includes No One Writes to the Colonel, The Autumn of the Patriarch, and Love in the Time of Cholera, alongside numerous short stories. As a journalist, García Márquez also authored five major journalistic works.

In 1982, García Márquez was awarded the Nobel Prize in Literature "for his novels and short stories, in which the fantastic and the realistic are combined in a richly composed world of imagination, reflecting a continent's life and conflicts." His Nobel acceptance speech, titled The Solitude of Latin America, emphasized the cultural and historical essence of the region. He is among a distinguished of group of Latin American authors who have received this honor.

== Novels and novellas ==
| Title | Year | Notes |
|---|---|---|
| La hojarasca (Leaf Storm) | 1954 | El Heraldo published one chapter of the novel in 1952. Then, the novel itself was published in 1955, thus becoming the first published novel by García Márquez. First appearance of Macondo. First appearance of the themes that García Márquez would revisit later in One Hundred Years of Solitude. |
| El coronel no tiene quien le escriba (No One Writes to the Colonel) | 1961 | Written between 1956 and 1957. In 1958, it was published in Mito magazine. Regarded as the first finished narrative work, both structurally and formally, within the Macondo literary universe. In García Márquez's own words, this book, El coronel no tiene quien le escriba, along with Los funerales de la Mamá Grande and La mala hora are really just one book: Tres de mis libros (...) son en verdad un solo libro. Un mismo tema, unos mismos personajes, un mismo ambiente, que se repiten y se mezclan (...) Los tres libros pertenecen al realismo tradicional. (Note: English: Three of my books (...) are really just one book. A single subject matter, the same characters, the same setting, that are repeated and combined (...) The three books belong to traditional realism.) |
| La mala hora (In Evil Hour) | 1962 | Published for the first time in 1962 by Taller de Artes Gráficas Luis Pérez, an edition that García Márquez himself would later disavow. In the writer's own words: La primera vez que se publicó La mala hora, en 1962, un corrector de prueba se permitió cambiar ciertos términos y almidonar el estilo, en nombre de la pureza del lenguaje. En esta ocasión, a su vez, el autor se ha permitido restituir las incorrecciones idiomáticas y las barbaridades estilísticas (...) Esta es, pues, la primera edición de La mala hora. (Note: English: The first time La mala hora was published, in 1962, a proofreader allowed himself to change certain words and stiffen up the style in the name of the purity of language. On this occasion, in turn, the author has allowed himself to restore the idiomatic incorrections and stylistic atrocities (...) Thus, this is the first edition of La mala hora.) Four years later, it was published by Mexican publishing house Ediciones Era, an edition that he recognized as the first one. It is stylistically similar to El coronel no tiene quien le escriba, takes place in the same unnamed town and involves many of the same characters. |
| Cien años de soledad (One Hundred Years of Solitude) | 1967 | Published in 1967 by Editorial Sudamericana with a print run of 8,000 copies, it was written over a course of two years and has been translated to more than 40 languages. It the most important and world-renowned novel by García Márquez, and one of the most representative of the magical realism style. In 1966, some fragments of the novel were published in magazines Eco, Amaru, and Nuevo Mundo. It signals the end of the Macondo period. |
| El otoño del patriarca (The Autumn of the Patriarch) | 1975 | The first dictator novel by García Márquez, it is "a character study in corruption and tyranny—García Márquez called it 'a poem on the solitude of power'." It was published simultaneously by publishing houses Plaza & Janés and Editorial Sudamericana. |
| Crónica de una muerte anunciada (Chronicle of a Death Foretold) | 1981 | After the novel was published, it was rumored that García Márquez had been allegedly involved in the incident that inspired it, or that he had at least witnessed it. The novel uses a “purely realist” narrative technique based on a real-life chronicle. |
| El amor en los tiempos del cólera (Love in the Time of Cholera) | 1985 | Mostly based on the experience of his parents, it tells the love story of two young people amid a cholera epidemic in the Caribbean. It was García Márquez's favorite book of his: Ese es el mejor (...) ese es el libro que escribí desde mis entrañas. (Note: English: That one is the best (...) that one is the book I wrote from the bottom of my heart.) |
| El general en su laberinto (The General in His Labyrinth) | 1989 | Another dictator novel, it traces Simón Bolívar's final journey, a seven-month voyage along the Magdalena River from Bogotá to the sea, until his death at the Quinta de San Pedro Alejandrino. It follows "documented history with considerable accuracy." |
| Del amor y otros demonios (Of Love and Other Demons) | 1994 | The first edition was published simultaneously by publishing houses Mondadori, Sudamericana, Diana, and Norma. The novel is set in a colonial seaport in South America and it tells the tale of Sierva María, a girl who may or may not have contracted rabies. |
| Memoria de mis putas tristes (Memories of My Melancholy Whores) | 2004 | An homage by García Márquez to Yasunari Kawabata’s The House of the Sleeping Beauties. |

== Short stories ==
| Title | Year | Notes |
|---|---|---|
| "La tercera resignación" ("The Third Resignation") | 1947 | First short story by García Márquez. Published in El Espectador in September 1947. The story has influences from Franz Kafka. |
| "Eva está dentro de su gato" ("Eva Is Inside Her Cat") | 1947 | Published in El Espectador in October 1947. |
| "La otra costilla de la muerte" ("The Other Rib of Death") | 1948 | Published in El Espectador in July 1948. |
| "Amargura para tres sonámbulos" ("Bitterness for Three Sleepwalkers") | 1949 | Published in El Espectador in November 1949. |
| "Diálogo del Espejo" ("Dialogue with the Mirror") | 1949 | Published in El Espectador in 1949. |
| "Ojos de perro azul" ("Eyes of a Blue Dog") | 1950 | Published in El Espectador in June 1950. It was later published as a collection of his early short stories. |
| "La mujer que llegaba a las seis" ("The Woman Who Came At Six O'Clock") | 1950 | Published in El Espectador in 1950. Adapted to the theater. Ernest Hemingway's short story The Killers is considered to be an inspiration for the story. |
| "abo, el negro que hizo esperar a los ángeles" ("Nabo: The Black Man Who Made the Angels Wait") | 1951 | Published in El Espectador in March 1951. The story was heavily influenced by Faulkner. It was also published as a collection of the short stories written by Márquez between 1947 and 1952. |
| "Alguien desordena estas rosas" ("Someone Has Been Disarranging These Roses") | 1952 | Published in Crónica in 1952. |
| "La noche de los alcaravanes" ("The Night of the Curlews") | 1953 | Published in Crónica in 1953. |
| "Monólogo de Isabel viendo llover en Macondo" ("Monologue of Isabel Watching it Rain in Macondo") | 1955 | Published in Mito magazine in 1955. One of the first appearances of Macondo. The story is a portrait of a woman whose incipient emotional depression is exacerbated by the rain and, by extension, by the ever-present and overpowering tropic. |
| "El mar del tiempo perdido" ("The Sea of Lost Time") | 1961 | Published in Revista Mexicana de Literatura (Mexican Literature Magazine) in 1962. |
| "La siesta del martes" ("Tuesday Siesta") | 1962 | Published in Los funerales de la Mamá Grande. First published in English in 1968. In an interview with Plinio Apuleyo Mendoza, García Márquez referred to it as "my best short story." He was inspired to write it after seeing a woman and her daughter dressed in black, walking in the burning desert sun, carrying a black umbrella. |
| "Un día de éstos" ("One of These Days") | 1962 | Published in Los funerales de la Mamá Grande. In 1954, García Márquez won a literary contest with this short story, which caught the attention of journalist Eduardo Zalamea Borda, who wrote: A muchos, yo entre ellos, nos parece una notable producción de un escritor verdadero (...)( Y eso nos gusta. Nos gusta y nos parece admirable. (Note: English: For many of us, me among them, it is a noteworthy production by a true writer (...) And we like it. We like it and find it admirable.) Often considered virtually a piece of a novel, since it is a version of a scene (...) which occurs in La mala hora and, in more rudimentary form, in El coronel no tiene quien le escriba. |
| "En este pueblo no hay ladrones" ("There Are No Thieves in This Town") | 1962 | Published in Los funerales de la Mamá Grande. |
| "La prodigiosa tarde de Baltazar" ("Balthazar's Marvelous Afternoon") | 1962 | Published in Los funerales de la Mamá Grande. |
| "La viuda de Montiel" ("Montiel's Widow") | 1962 | Published in Los funerales de la Mamá Grande. |
| "Un día después del sábado" ("One Day After Saturday") | 1962 | Published in Los funerales de la Mamá Grande. First-prize winner in the contest of the National Association of Writers and Artists. |
| "Rosas artificiales" ("Artificial Roses") | 1962 | Published in Los funerales de la Mamá Grande. |
| "Los funerales de la Mamá Grande" ("Big Mama's Funeral") | 1962 | Published in Los funerales de la Mamá Grande. |
| "Un señor muy viejo con unas alas enormes" ("A Very Old Man with Enormous Wings") | 1968 | Published in La increíble y triste historia de la cándida Eréndira y de su abuela desalmada. It tells the story of what happens when an angel comes to town. |
| "El ahogado más hermoso del mundo" ("The Handsomest Drowned Man in the World") | 1968 | Published in La increíble y triste historia de la cándida Eréndira y de su abuela desalmada. "It presents the appearance in a pedestrian world of a being of singular grace and beauty, such that he transforms forever the vision of those around him." |
| "El último viaje del buque fantasma" ("The Last Voyage of the Ghost Ship") | 1968 | Published in La increíble y triste historia de la cándida Eréndira y de su abuela desalmada. |
| "Blacamán el bueno, vendedor de milagros" ("Blacamán the Good, Vendor of Miracles") | 1968 | Published in La increíble y triste historia de la cándida Eréndira y de su abuela desalmada. |
| "Muerte constante más allá del amor" ("Death Constant Beyond Love") | 1970 | Published in La increíble y triste historia de la cándida Eréndira y de su abuela desalmada. It is "a psychological study of the awakening to lust at an unfortunately advanced age." |
| "El rastro de tu sangre en la nieve" ("The Trail of Your Blood in the Snow") | 1976 | Published in 1976. Later included in the collection Doce cuentos peregrinos. The common theme in both this story and El verano feliz de la señora Forbes, according to Méndez: (...) es la experiencia de los latinoamericanos en Europa, los puntos de contacto y las diferencias entre las culturas del viejo y el nuevo continente. (Note: English: (...) is the experience of Latin Americans in Europe, the points of contact, and the differences between the cultures of the old and the new continent.) This short story calls to mind the works of Franz Kafka. |
| "El verano feliz de la señora Forbes" ("Miss Forbes's Summer of Happiness") | 1976 | Published in 1976. Later included in the collection Doce cuentos peregrinos. |
| "Sólo vine a hablar por teléfono" ("I Only Came to Use the Phone") | 1978 | Published in Doce cuentos peregrinos. |
| "La luz es como el agua" ("Light is Like Water") | 1978 | Published in Doce cuentos peregrinos. |
| "María dos Prazeres" | 1979 | Published in Doce cuentos peregrinos. |
| "Buen viaje, señor presidente" ("Bon Voyage, Mr. President") | 1976 | Published in Doce cuentos peregrinos. One of the morals of this short story is that someone is always out to take advantage of people. |
| "Me alquilo para soñar" ("I Sell My Dreams") | 1980 | Published in Doce cuentos peregrinos. |
| "Diecisiete ingleses envenenados" ("Seventeen Poisoned Englishmen") | 1980 | Published in Doce cuentos peregrinos. |
| "Espantos de Agosto" ("The Ghosts of August") | 1980 | Published in Doce cuentos peregrinos. |
| "La santa" ("The Saint") | 1981 | Published in Doce cuentos peregrinos. |
| "Tramontana" | 1982 | Published in Doce cuentos peregrinos. |
| "El avión de la bella durmiente" ("The Airplane of the Sleeping Beauty") | 1982 | Published in Doce cuentos peregrinos. |

== Short story collections ==
| Title | Year | Notes |
|---|---|---|
| Los funerales de la Mamá Grande (Big Mama's Funeral) | 1962 | Published in Xalapa, in 1962, by Universidad Veracruzana. |
| La increíble y triste historia de la cándida Eréndira y de su abuela desalmada (The Incredible and Sad Tale of Innocent Eréndira and Her Heartless Grandmother) | 1972 | Collection of four short stories written between January and July 1968, a story from 1961, and a story published in 1970. |
| Ojos de perro azul (Eyes of a Blue Dog) | 1972 | Collection of his early short stories, published in newspapers between 1947 and 1955. |
| Doce cuentos peregrinos (Strange Pilgrims) | 1992 | A collection of twelve short stories. |

== Non-fiction ==
| Title | Year | Notes |
|---|---|---|
| Relato de un náufrago (The Story of a Shipwrecked Sailor) | 1970 | First published for 14 consecutive days in El Espectador in 1955. |
| La Soledad de América Latina (The Solitude of Latin America) | 1982 | Speech given by García Márquez upon being awarded the 1982 Nobel Prize in Literature. |
| El olor de la guayaba (The Fragrance of Guava) | 1982 | A book based on conversations between García Márquez and his close friend Plinio Apuleyo Mendoza. |
| La aventura de Miguel Littín clandestino en Chile (Clandestine in Chile: The Adventures of Miguel Littín) | 1986 | A report about the Chilean filmmaker Miguel Littín’s clandestine visit to his home country after 12 years in exile. |
| El cataclismo de Damocles (The Cataclysm of Damocles) | 1986 | Speech given by García Márquez in Ixtapa, Mexico on 6 August 1986, on the 41st anniversary of the bombing of Hiroshima |
| Noticia de un secuestro (News of a Kidnapping) | 1996 | Published simultaneously in Colombia and Spain in May 1996, marking García Márquez's return to journalistic reporting. |
| Vivir para contarla (Living to Tell the Tale) | 2002 | His autobiography. |
| Yo no vengo a decir un discurso (I'm Not Here to Give a Speech) | 2010 | A collection of 22 of speeches given by García Márquez between 1944 and 2007. |

== Plays ==
- Diatriba de amor contra un hombre sentado (Diatribe of Love Against a Seated Man) (1994) Finished in 1987, premiered in 1988, and published in 1994.

== Screenplays ==
- Viva Sandino (1982)

== See also ==
- Latin American Boom
- Latin American Literature
- I'm Not Here to Give a Speech

== Bibliography ==
- Armillas-Tiseyra, Magalí (2019). "Fathers of the Fatherlands: Writing, Politics, and Literary Form at the End of the Latin American "Boom"" (PDF). The Dictator Novel: Writers and Politics in the Global South. Illinois, United States: Northwestern University Press. ISBN 9780810140424.
- Burgueño Muñoz, José Manuel (2008). La invención en el periodismo informativo (in Spanish). Barcelona, Spain: Editorial UOC. ISBN 9788497887335.
- Castro Lee, Cecilia, ed. (2005). En torno a la violencia en Colombia: una propuesta interdisciplinaria (in Spanish). Cali, Colombia: University of Valle. ISBN 9586703703.
- Cebrián, Melanie (2009). Representación histórica en la obra de Gabriel García Márquez (in Spanish). Hamburg, Germany: Diplomica Verlag. ISBN 9783836670319.
- Cobo Borda, Juan Gustavo (1997). Para llegar a García Márquez (in Spanish). Bogotá, Colombia: Tercer Mundo. ISBN 958-614-568-9.
- Coto, Benigno Delmiro (2002). La escritura creativa en las aulas (in Spanish). Barcelona, Spain: Editorial Graó. ISBN 9788478275861.
- Dauster, Frank (1973). "The Short Stories of García Márquez" (PDF). Books Abroad. 47 (3): 466–70. doi:10.2307/40127319. JSTOR 40127319.
- Dimilta, Juan José (2004). García Márquez: El invencible ritual de la nostalgia (in Spanish). Colombia: Ojos de Papel Ediciones. ISBN 9788496138117.
- González, Nelly S. (2003). Bibliographic guide to Gabriel García Márquez, 1992-2002. United Kingdom: Bloomsbury Academic. ISBN 9780313328046.
- Kline, Carmenza (2003). Los orígenes del relato: los lazos entre ficción y realidad en la obra de Gabriel García Márquez (in Spanish). Salamanca, Spain: University of Salamanca. ISBN 978-84-7800-803-2.
- McGrady, Donald (1972). "Acerca de una colección desconocida de relatos por Gabriel García Márquez" (PDF). Bulletin of the Caro and Cuervo Institute (in Spanish). 27 (2): 293–320.
- Méndez, José Luis (2000). Cómo leer a García Márquez: una interpretación sociológica (in Spanish). San Juan, Puerto Rico: University of Puerto Rico. ISBN 0847703991.
- Ploetz, Dagmar (2004). Gabriel García Márquez (in Spanish). Madrid: Editorial Edaf. ISBN 9788441414488.
- Pons, María Cristina (1996). Memorias del olvido: La novela histórica de fines del siglo XX (in Spanish). Mexico: Siglo XXI Editores. ISBN 9789682320187.
- Quintín, Clara Inés, ed. (2002). Colombia: Guía Enciclopédica (in Spanish). Vol. I. Bogotá, Colombia: Grupo Editorial Norma. ISBN 9789580468066.
- Rocco, Alessandro (2014). Gabriel García Márquez and the Cinema: Life and Works. Boydell & Brewer. ISBN 978-1-78204-337-9. JSTOR 10.7722/j.ctt7zstjz.
- Rodríguez-Pliego, Mariajosé (2016). Reading Faulkner South of the South: The Latin American Boom's Roots and Legacy (Honors in English thesis). Massachusetts, United States: Wellesley College.
- Roldán de Micolta, Aleyda (2007). La crítica literaria, un sostenido acto de amor: lectura de nueve autores contemporáneos (in Spanish). Cali, Colombia: University of Valle. ISBN 9789586706216.
- Ruiz Gusils, Jorge (2002). Índice de escritores latinoamericanos (in Spanish). Mexico: National Autonomous University of Mexico. ISBN 9789683697646.
- Sosnowski, Saúl (1997). Lectura crítica de la literatura americana (in Spanish). Venezuela: Biblioteca Ayacucho. ISBN 9802762938.
- Vargas Llosa, Mario; Williams, Roger (1973). "A Morbid Prehistory (The Early Stories)". Books Abroad. 47 (3). Board of Regents of the University of Oklahoma: 451–460. doi:10.2307/40127317. JSTOR 40127317.
- Wood, Michael (1990). Gabriel García Márquez: One Hundred Years of Solitude. United Kingdom: Cambridge University Press. ISBN 0-521-31692-8.
