= 1968 Nobel Prize in Literature =

- Yasunari Kawabata
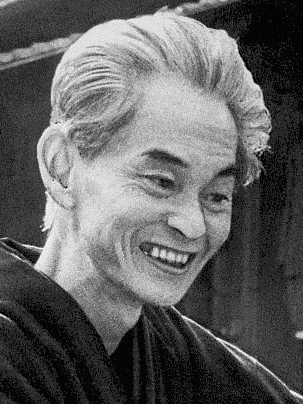
- "for his narrative mastery, which with great sensibility expresses the essence of the Japanese mind."
- Date: 10 October 1968 (announcement); 10 December 1968 (ceremony)
- Location: Stockholm, Sweden
- Presented by: Swedish Academy
- First award: 1901
- Website: Official website

The 1968 Nobel Prize in Literature was awarded to the Japanese writer Yasunari Kawabata (1899–1972) "for his narrative mastery, which with great sensibility expresses the essence of the Japanese mind." He is the first Japanese recipient of the prize.

== Laureate ==
Yasunari Kawabata's short story Izu no odoriko ("The Dancing Girl of Izu"), first published in 1926, served as his literary debut. After producing a number of noteworthy works, Kawabata's 1937 novel Yukiguni ("Snow Country") established him as one of Japan's most renowned writers. In 1949, he published two serial novels Senbazuru ("Thousand Cranes") and Yama no Oto. His later works include Mizuumi ("The Lake", 1955) and Koto ("The Old Capital", 1962). Both in the author's home country and abroad, The Old Capital left the biggest impression.

== Deliberations ==
=== Nominations ===
Kawabata was nominated on 8 occasions starting in 1961. He was annually nominated with single nominations made by members of the Swedish Academy. In 1968, his nomination was made by Eyvind Johnson, member of the said academy.

In total, the Nobel Committee received 112 nominations for 76 writers from various academics, literary critics and societies. Among the repeated nominees were Ezra Pound and E. M. Forster – both dismissed on account of their advancing ages – Max Frisch, Louis Aragon, Charles de Gaulle, Graham Greene, Vladimir Nabokov and Eugène Ionesco – the latter two authors were set aside because of their controversial works. Nineteen of the nominees were newly nominated such as Patrick White (awarded in 1973), Luis Buñuel, Claude Lévi-Strauss, Friedebert Tuglas, Tadeusz Różewicz, Vladimír Holan, Angus Wilson, Zbigniew Herbert, and Sławomir Mrożek. The oldest nominee was the Spanish philologist Ramón Menéndez Pidal (aged 99) and the youngest was Sławomir Mrożek (aged 38). Five of the nominees were women namely Marie Under, Anna Seghers, Marianne Moore, Mildred Breedlove, and Katherine Anne Porter.

The authors Karl Barth, Charles Bean, Joaquín Edwards Bello, Enid Mary Blyton, Max Brod, Abel Bonnard, Anthony Boucher, Helen Cam, León Felipe Camino, Jacques Chardonne, Donald Davidson, Pablo de Rokha, Margaret Duley, Edna Ferber, Romano Guardini, Germaine Guèvremont, D. Gwenallt Jones, Fannie Hurst, Anna Kavan, Helen Keller, Alexandre Kojève, Zofia Kossak-Szczucka, Donagh MacDonagh, Dorothea Mackellar, Thomas Merton, Harold Nicolson, Mervyn Peake, Sixto Pondal Ríos, Conrad Richter, Marah Roesli, and Tian Han died in 1968 without having been nominated for the prize.

Official list of nominees and their nominators for the prize
No.	Nominee	Country	Genre(s)	Nominator(s) (Note: Some names of the nominators for the 1968 Nobel Prize in Literature were not present in the list released by the Swedish Academy.)
1	Jorge Amado (1912–2001)	Brazil	novel, short story	Antônio Olinto (1919–2009); Jean Subirats (–); Brazilian Writers Association
2	Jean Anouilh (1910–1987)	France	drama, screenplay, translation	Emil Ernst Ploss (1925–1972); Paul Pédech (1912–2005)
3	Louis Aragon (1897–1982)	France	novel, short story, poetry, essays	Jean Gaudon (1926–2019); Pierre Angel (1913–2007); Robert Ricatte (1913–1995); Jacques Proust (1926–2005)
4	Alexandre Arnoux (1884–1973)	France	screenplay	François Bar (1907–1984)
5	Wystan Hugh Auden (1907–1973)	United Kingdom; United States	poetry, essays, screenplay	
6	Agustí Bartra (1908–1982)	Spain	poetry, songwriting, translation	
7	Samuel Beckett (1906–1989)	Ireland	novel, drama, poetry	Gerhard Heilfurth (1909–2006); Robert Brustein (1927–2023); Matthew Hodgart (1916–1996); William Stuart Maguinness (1903–1983); Siegbert Salomon Prawer (1925–2012); Nelly Sachs (1891–1970)
8	Henri Bosco (1888–1976)	France	novel, short story	
9	Mildred Breedlove (1904–1994)	United States	poetry	Amado Yuzon (1906–1979)
10	Luis Buñuel (1900–1983)	Spain	screenplay	
11	Heinrich Böll (1917–1985)	West Germany	novel, short story	Gustav Korlén (1915–2014)
12	Paul Celan (1920–1970)	Romania; France	poetry, translation	
13	André Chamson (1900–1983)	France	novel, essays	Pierre-Henri Simon (1903–1972); Marc Boegner (1881–1970)
14	René Char (1907–1988)	France	poetry	
15	Charles de Gaulle (1890–1970)	France	memoir, essays	
16	Joseph Delteil (1894–1978)	France	poetry, novel, short story, essays	
17	Friedrich Dürrenmatt (1921–1990)	Switzerland	drama, novel, short story, essays	Gustav Siebenmann (1923–2025)
18	Gunnar Ekelöf (1907–1968)	Sweden	poetry, essays	Gunnar Tideström (1906–1985); Pär Lagerkvist (1891–1974)
19	Mircea Eliade (1907–1986)	Romania; United States	history, philosophy, essays, autobiography, novel, short story	Stig Wikander (1908–1983)
20	Konstantin Fedin (1892–1977)	Soviet Union	novel, poetry, essays	Union of Soviet Writers
21	Edward Morgan Forster (1879–1970)	United Kingdom	novel, short story, drama, essays, biography, literary criticism	Georg Roppen (1919–1983)
21	Max Frisch (1911–1991)	Switzerland	novel, drama	
22	Jean Giono (1895–1970)	France	novel, short story, essays, poetry, drama	
23	Witold Gombrowicz (1904–1969)	Poland	short story, novel, drama	
24	Robert Graves (1895–1985)	United Kingdom	history, novel, poetry, literary criticism, essays	
25	Graham Greene (1904–1991)	United Kingdom	novel, short story, autobiography, essays	Karl Ragnar Gierow (1904–1982)
26	Jorge Guillén (1893–1984)	Spain	poetry, literary criticism	
27	Zbigniew Herbert (1924–1998)	Poland	poetry, essays, short story, drama	Karl Ragnar Gierow (1904–1982)
28	Alberto Hidalgo Lobato (1897–1967)	Peru	poetry, essays	
29	Vladimír Holan (1905–1980)	Czechoslovakia	poetry, essays	Gunnar Jakobsson (1886–1972)
30	Hans Egon Holthusen (1913–1997)	West Germany	poetry, literary criticism, essays	
31	Taha Hussein (1889–1973)	Egypt	novel, short story, poetry, translation	William Montgomery Watt (1909–2006); Kuwait University; University of Jordan; Academy of the Arabic Language
32	Eugène Ionesco (1909–1994)	Romania; France	drama, essays	Paul Vernois (1920–1997); Walter Mönch (1905–1994)
33	Marcel Jouhandeau (1888–1979)	France	short story, novel	
34	Pierre Jean Jouve (1887–1976)	France	poetry, novel, literary criticism	
35	Yasunari Kawabata (1899–1972)	Japan	novel, short story	Eyvind Johnson (1900–1976)
36	Miroslav Krleža (1893–1981)	Yugoslavia	poetry, drama, short story, novel, essays	
37	Erich Kästner (1899–1974)	West Germany	poetry, screenplay, autobiography	PEN Centre Germany
38	Claude Lévi-Strauss (1908–2008)	Belgium; France	philosophy, essays	
39	Robert Lowell (1917–1977)	United States	poetry, translation	William Alfred (1922–1999); Thomas McLernon Greene (1926–2003)
40	Hugh MacDiarmid (1892–1978)	United Kingdom	poetry, essays	David Daiches (1912–2005)
41	Compton Mackenzie (1883–1972)	United Kingdom	novel, short story, drama, poetry, history, biography, essays, literary criticism, memoir	Angus McIntosh (1914–2005); Thomas Anthony Dunn (1923–1988); Edmund Blunden (1896–1974); John Boyd Orr (1880–1971); Alexander Robertus Todd (1907–1997); Alexander Norman Jeffares (1920–2005); William Walker Chambers (1913–1985); Eric Linklater (1899–1974); Malcolm Muggeridge (1903–1990); Alistair Mair (1924–1975); Nigel Tranter (1909–2000); Alan Martin Boase (1902–1982); Moray McLaren (1901–1971); William MacTaggart (1903–1981)
42	André Malraux (1901–1976)	France	novel, essays, literary criticism	
43	Gustave Lucien Martin-Saint-René (1888–1973)	France	poetry, novel, essays, literary criticism, drama, songwriting, short story	
44	Segismundo Masel (1895–1985)	Argentina	essays	Antonio de Tornes Ballesteros (–)
45	Ramón Menéndez Pidal (1869–1968)	Spain	philology, history	
46	Yukio Mishima (1925–1970)	Japan	novel, short story, drama, literary criticism	Henry Olsson (1896–1985)
47	Eugenio Montale (1896–1981)	Italy	poetry, translation	
48	Henry de Montherlant (1895–1972)	France	essays, novel, drama	Barthélémy-Antonin Taladoire (1907–1976); Adrien Fourrier (–); The Greek PEN-Club
49	Marianne Moore (1887–1972)	United States	poetry, literary criticism, essays, translation	Erik Lindegren (1910–1968)
50	Alberto Moravia (1907–1990)	Italy	novel, literary criticism, essays, drama	
51	Vladimir Nabokov (1899–1977)	Russia; United States	novel, short story, poetry, drama, translation, literary criticism, memoir	Elizabeth Hill (1900–1996); The Swedish PEN–Club
52	Pablo Neruda (1904–1973)	Chile	poetry	
53	Junzaburō Nishiwaki (1894–1982)	Japan	poetry, literary criticism	
54	Germán Pardo García (1902–1991)	Colombia; Mexico	poetry	James Willis Robb (1918–2010); Kurt Leopold Levy (1917–2000)
55	Konstantin Paustovsky (1892–1968)	Soviet Union	novel, poetry, drama	
56	Katherine Anne Porter (1890–1980)	United States	short story, essays	
57	Ezra Pound (1885–1972)	United States	poetry, essays	
58	Tadeusz Rózewicz (1921–2014)	Poland	poetry, drama, translation	
59	Anna Seghers (1900–1983)	East Germany	novel, short story	
60	Jaroslav Seifert (1901–1986)	Czechoslovakia	poetry, memoir, translation	
61	Claude Simon (1913–2005)	France	novel, essays	Lars Gyllensten (1921–2006)
62	Pierre-Henri Simon (1903–1972)	France	essays, novel, literary criticism, poetry	
63	Gustave Thibon (1903–2001)	France	philosophy	Édouard Delebecque (1910–1990)
64	Friedebert Tuglas (1886–1971)	Estonia	short story, literary criticism	The Finnish PEN Club
65	Pietro Ubaldi (1886–1972)	Italy	philosophy, essays	
66	Marie Under (1883–1980)	Estonia	poetry	The Finnish PEN Club
67	Mika Waltari (1908–1979)	Finland	short story, novel, poetry, drama, essays, screenplay	Esko Pennanen (1912–1990)
68	Peter Vansittart (1920–2008)	United Kingdom	novel, essays, memoir	Herbert Howarth (1900–1971)
69	Erico Verissimo (1905–1975)	Brazil	novel, short story, autobiography, essays, translation	
70	Tarjei Vesaas (1897–1970)	Norway	poetry, novel	Otto Christian Oberholzer (1919–1986); Karl-Hampus Dahlstedt (1917–1996); Carl-Eric Thors (1920–1986); Sigmund Skard (1903–1995); Johannes Andreasson Dale (1898–1975); Harald Noreng (1913–2006)
71	Simon Vestdijk (1898–1971)	Netherlands	novel, poetry, essays, translation	The Dutch PEN Club; Royal Netherlands Academy of Arts and Sciences
72	Patrick White (1912–1990)	Australia	novel, short story, drama, poetry, autobiography	Muriel Clara Bradbrook (1909–1993)
72	Kazimierz Wierzyński (1894–1969)	Poland	poetry, essays	
73	Thornton Wilder (1897–1975)	United States	drama, novel, short story	Hans Peter Wapnewski (1922–2012); Frederick Albert Pottle (1897–1987)
74	Angus Wilson (1913–1991)	United Kingdom	novel, short story, essays	Nicholas Brooke (1924–1998)
75	Edmund Wilson (1895–1972)	United States	essays, literary criticism, short story, drama	Wiktor Weintraub (1908–1988)
76	Sławomir Mrożek (1930–2013)	Poland	drama, essays	Karl Ragnar Gierow (1904–1982)

=== Prize decision ===
The leading contenders for the prize in 1968 were the French novelist André Malraux and the Irish playwright Samuel Beckett (awarded in 1969). The third proposal by the Nobel Committee was the British poet W. H. Auden and Kawabata was the fourth. Anders Österling, chair of the committee, and committee member Eyvind Johnson pushed for the choice of Malraux, while the other three members of the committee supported a prize for Beckett. Eventually Kawabata was the candidate that could be agreed upon, following the Swedish Academy's ambition in the 1960s to award authors from different language areas and parts of the world. The committee had deliberated the Japanese authors Jun'ichirō Tanizaki and Yasunari Kawabata since 1960 and even sent a representative to Japan to survey who was the most popular writer. A shared prize to Tanizaki and Kawabata had been proposed before Tanizaki's death in 1965. In 1968, the committee also considered Yukio Mishima, a Japanese author of a younger generation. While supporting a prize for Malraux, Österling admitted that a prize for Kawabata "should prove justified and welcome."

== Reactions ==
Donald Keene, a Japanese literature scholar and professor, was surprised that the Swedish Academy had not awarded Yukio Mishima the prize, but said that Kawabata "certainly deserved the recognition". According to Keene, the prize decision was "greeted with something approaching national delirium" in Japan, but that the Japanese at the same time were puzzled how Kawabata could be understood in the Western world: "Of all contemporary Japanese writers Kawabata is most closely concerned with the objects and landscapes of traditional Japan, and he employs an allusive, indirect style stemming from the old literature, rather than the straightforward expression other Japanese novelists have borrowed from the West. Certainly Kawabata's best novels are not considered easy reading even by the Japanese, and it puzzles them that the Committee in Stockholm should have chosen so intensely Japanese a writer."

In 1970, Artur Lundkvist, a member of the Swedish Academy and its Nobel committee expressed dissatisfaction with the choice of Kawabata: "Sure he is a representative of the Japanese tea drinking traditions and cherryflowers and that. But he says nothing about the Japanese reality", Lundkvist said, "In that sense I think Mikima [Yukio Mishima] in his writing has a better grip on the realities in Japan."

== Nobel lecture ==
Kawabata's Nobel Lecture was titled Japan, The Beautiful and Myself (美しい日本の私―その序説). Zen Buddhism was a key focal point of the speech; much was devoted to practitioners and the general practices of Zen Buddhism and how it differed from other types of Buddhism. He presented a severe picture of Zen Buddhism, where disciples can enter salvation only through their efforts, where they are isolated for several hours at a time, and how from this isolation there can come beauty. He noted that Zen practices focus on simplicity and it is this simplicity that proves to be the beauty. "The heart of the ink painting is in space, abbreviation, what is left undrawn." From painting he moved on to talk about ikebana and bonsai as art forms that emphasize the elegance and beauty that arises from the simplicity. "The Japanese garden, too, of course symbolizes the vastness of nature."

In addition to the numerous mentions of Zen and nature, one topic that was briefly mentioned in Kawabata's lecture was that of suicide. Kawabata reminisced of other famous Japanese authors who committed suicide, in particular Ryūnosuke Akutagawa. He contradicted the custom of suicide as being a form of enlightenment, mentioning the priest Ikkyū, who also thought of suicide twice. He quoted Ikkyū, "Among those who give thoughts to things, is there one who does not think of suicide?" There was much speculation about this quote being a clue to Kawabata's suicide in 1972, a year and a half after Mishima had committed suicide.
