= Ye Weiqu =

- 叶渭渠
- Born: August 6, 1929; Cholon, French Indo-China
- Died: December 11, 2010 (aged 81); Beijing, China
- Education: Peking University
- Occupations: Translator, scholar, professor
- Writing career
- Language: Chinese, Japanese
- Period: 1955–2005
- Genre: Novel
- Notable works: Snow Country; Thousand Cranes

Ye Weiqu (simplified Chinese: 叶渭渠; traditional Chinese: 葉渭渠; pinyin: Yè Wèiqú; 6 August 1929 – 11 December 2010) was a Chinese Vietnamese translator and scholar. Ye was a visiting professor at Waseda University, Gakushuin University and Ritsumeikan University.

He was among the first few in China who translated the works of Yasunari Kawabata's into Chinese language.

== Biography ==
Ye was a Chinese Vietnamese born on Cholon, French Indo-China on August 6, 1929, with his ancestral home in Dongguan, Guangdong.

In 1952, Ye went to Beijing from Hong Kong, he graduated from Peking University, majoring in Japanese at the Department of East Language and Literature. After graduation, he was assigned an editor to the People's Literature Publishing House and Chinese Academy of Social Sciences.

In 1966, the Cultural Revolution was launched by Mao Zedong, Ye and his wife Tang Yuemei's whole collection of books was burned by the Red Guards, the couple were sent to the May Seventh Cadre Schools to work in Henan.

In 1976, Hua Guofeng and Ye Jianying toppled the Gang of Four, the couple were rehabilitated by Deng Xiaoping, at the same time, they started to study Japanese literature.

Ye died of heart disease at Chuiyangliu Hospital, in Beijing, on December 11, 2010.

== Works ==
- The History of Japanese Culture (日本文化史)
- The History of Japanese Literature (日本文学史)
- (日本文学思潮史)
- Mono no aware and Tacit consciousness: Japanese Aesthetical Sense (物哀与幽玄——日本人的美意识)
- The Biography of Kawabata Yasunari (冷艳文士——川端康成传)
- The Biography of Jun'ichirō Tanizaki (谷崎润一郎传)
- Kanikosen (Takiji Kobayashi) (蟹工船)
- Snow Country (Yasunari Kawabata) (雪国)
- Thousand Cranes (Yasunari Kawabata) (千羽鹤)
- The Dancing Girl of Izu (Yasunari Kawabata) (伊豆的舞女)

== Awards ==
- Chinese Translation Association – Competent Translator (2004)

== Personal life ==
In 1956, Ye married his middle school sweetheart Tang Yuemei, also a translator, in Beijing.
