= Mary Towq Ghosh =

Lebanese writer and translator

- Born: 1963 (age 62–63); Lebanon
- Education: The Lebanese University (B.A.)
- Occupations: Writer, translator
- Writing career
- Language: Arabic, French
- Genres: Short story, novel, literary articles, translation

Mary Towq Ghosh (Arabic: ماري طوق غوش; born 1963) is a Lebanese translator and writer. She is famous for the Arabization of internationally recognized novels, such as Yasunari Kawabata’s "The House of the Sleeping Beauties" and Peter Handke's "The Left-Handed Woman," as well as translated French poems composed by the great Abbas Beydoun and Abdo Wazen. She, too, worked as a writer for a number of Lebanese and Arab newspapers, in which she published short stories and critical articles.

== Education ==
In 1990, Mary enrolled in Lebanese University, from which she obtained her bachelor's degree in French literature.

== Career ==
Mary have always loved to write, and had a number of her short stories and articles published in Lebanese and Arab newspapers. She hopes to publish her own novel one day; one in a Lebanese context but following the same rhythm as "Soul Mountain" novel. Another novel that inspired her was Mathias Énard’s "Zone," which is distinguished by the fast-paced narration of events, and for being composed of only one sentence. Mary preferred novels like these seeing that it best suited her style of writing. In her interview with Al-Jarida newspaper, Mary expressed that she is working on overcoming the fear of publishing a piece of work in her own voice.

Yasunari Kawabata's "The House of the Sleeping Beauties" was the first novel that Mary translated into French. Her work was first recognized by one of her friends, who, upon reading a chapter of Mary's translated novel, sent it to the editorial director of As-Safir newspaper, Elias Khoury, who was also impressed by Mary's work, and requested the full copy of the novel. Khoury then sent the novel to the founder of Dar Al Adab for publishing and distribution, Dr. Suhayl Idris, who published it. Despite the communications blackout and impassable roads which delayed the delivery of news, Mary was happy to learn about the publication of her translated novel, which, in turn, pushed her to pursue her career in the field of translation. Although she is not passionate about translation, she considered it as means to continue exploring in the field of literature. She took the habit in translating the works that only interested her, and did so in plain, yet catchy, language. She vowed to never stop until she has completed translating all the works of literature that she has enjoyed reading. Besides, she translated poems composed by renowned poets, such as Abbas Beydoun and Abdo Wazen, into French, as well as screenplays composed by the late Randa Chahal.

In 2017, Abu Dhabi Department of Culture and Tourism launched «Kalima Project for Translation» and displayed many of Mary's literary translations, including, most notably, "Bad Weather" novel by the French writer, Marie NDiaye.

Mary is currently working as a teacher in Byblos District, which is also her city of residence.

== Works ==
Few of her translations include:

- “Soul Mountain" by Gao Xingjian (translated title: Jabal Al-Rawh), Dar Al Adab for publishing and distribution, Beirut, 1990. Mary translated this novel with the help of the late Bassam Hajjar.
- "The Left-Handed Woman" by Peter Handke (translated title: Al-Mar’a Al-‘Araa’), Dar Al Adab for publishing and distribution, Beirut, 1990.
- "The Emperor's Tomb" by Joseph Roth (translated title: Madafin Al-kabushiyyin), Dar Al-Farabi, Beirut, 1997.
- "Aurelia" by Gérard de Nerval (translated title: Orealia), Dar Al-Farabi, Beirut, 2003.
- "The House of the Sleeping Beauties" by Yasunari Kawabata (translated title: Al-Jamilaat Al-Na’imat), Bustan Al-Marefa for printing, publishing and distribution, Alexandria, 2006.
- "Beirut" by Samir Kassir (translated title: Tarikh Bayrut), Dar An-Nahar, Beirut, 2006.
- "The King of Absentees" by Elias Sanbar (translated title: Malik-u Al-Gha’ibeen), Dar An-Nahar, Beirut, 2007.
- "The Unbearable Lightness of Being" by Milan Kundera (translated title: Ka’in Alati La Tahtamil Khifatahu), Arab Cultural Center, Beirut, 2008.
- "Zone" by Mathias Énard (translated title: Zown), Librairie Orientale, Beirut, 2008.
- "The Intellectuals" by Simone de Beauvoir (translated title: Al-Muthaqafun), Dar Al Adab, Beirut, 2009.
- "Under the Pergola" by Hiam Yared (translated title: That Al-‘Areesh), Dar Al Adab, Beirut, 2012.
- "The Fairy Tales Of Madame d'Aulnoy" by Marie-Catherine d'Aulnoy (translated title: Al-‘Osfur Al-Azraq w-Hikayat ‘Ukhraa), Kalima Project for Translation – Abu Dhabi Department of Culture and Tourism, Abu Dhabi, 2013.
- "The Letters" by Gustave Flaubert (translated title: Nusus Al-Siba), Kalima Project for Translation – Abu Dhabi Department of Culture and Tourism, Abu Dhabi, 2014.
- "The Daughters of Fire" by Gérard de Nerval (translated title: Bunayaat Al-Lahab), UAE Public Library and Cultural Center, Abu Dhabi, 2018. The book features stories and poems that are classified under the category «Classics of the French literature.» The book was supervised by the Iraqi poet and scholar, Kadhim Jihad.
- A chapter from "The Kindly Ones" by Jonathan Littell (translated title: Al-Rahimat), An-Nahar newspaper, Beirut.
