= Sleeping Beauty (2011 film) =

2011 film by Julia Leigh

- Theatrical release poster
- Directed by: Julia Leigh
- Screenplay by: Julia Leigh
- Produced by: Jessica Brentnall
- Starring: Emily Browning; Rachael Blake; Ewen Leslie; Peter Carroll; Chris Haywood
- Cinematography: Geoffrey Simpson
- Edited by: Nick Meyers
- Music by: Ben Frost
- Production companies: Screen Australia; Magic Films; Screen NSW; Deluxe Australia; Spectrum Films; Big Ears Productions
- Distributed by: Paramount Pictures; Transmission Films
- Release dates: 12 May 2011 (Cannes); 23 June 2011 (Australia)
- Running time: 102 minutes
- Country: Australia
- Language: English
- Budget: A$3 million
- Box office: US$408,680

Sleeping Beauty is a 2011 Australian erotic psychological drama film written and directed by Julia Leigh in her directorial debut, and starring Emily Browning, Rachael Blake, Ewen Leslie, Peter Carroll, and Chris Haywood. The film follows Lucy, a young female university student who takes up a part-time high-paying job with a mysterious group that caters to rich men and women who like the company of nude sleeping young women. Lucy is required to sleep alongside paying customers and be absolutely submissive to their erotic desires, fulfilling their fantasies by voluntarily entering into physical unconsciousness.

The film is loosely based on the novels The House of the Sleeping Beauties and Memories of My Melancholy Whores by Nobel laureates Yasunari Kawabata and Gabriel García Márquez, respectively, as well as on a recurring nightmare Leigh experienced in which she dreamt she was being filmed in her sleep. Filming took place in Sydney in early 2010.

Sleeping Beauty premiered at the 2011 Cannes Film Festival as the first Competition entry to be screened. It was the first Australian film in competition at Cannes since Moulin Rouge! (2001). It was released theatrically in Australia on 23 June 2011 by Paramount Pictures and Transmission Films. It received a limited theatrical release in the United States on 2 December 2011 through IFC Films, to mixed reviews.

== Plot ==
Lucy is a university student who pays her tuition and rent by doing several jobs: she works in an office in the daytime and at a restaurant in the evenings, and she is occasionally a research subject at a science laboratory. Her sister's boyfriend continually pesters her about paying her share of the rent. She is caring for Birdmann, who is an alcoholic and is very attracted to her. While she does not return his sexual interest, Lucy enjoys Birdmann's company, and in his presence is the only time she is shown smiling or laughing. An old joke between the two is that Birdmann frequently asks Lucy to marry him; Lucy always says no. Due to lack of money and Birdmann's addiction, Lucy makes a decision to look for another part-time job.

In response to a classified ad for yet another short-term job, Lucy meets Clara, who runs a service that combines lingerie modelling and catering, performed by young women at a black tie dinner party for mostly male clients. Clara assures her that the men are not allowed to touch the women sexually. Lucy agrees to try it. Clara inspects Lucy's body and names her Sara for the purpose of anonymity. At the dinner party, Lucy is the only girl dressed in white; the other women wear black lingerie that is much more revealing than Lucy's outfit.

After one other session as a serving girl, Lucy is promoted. She receives a call from Clara's assistant for a different request. Lucy is driven to a country mansion and offered a new role wherein she will be voluntarily sedated and sleep naked while male clients lie beside her. They are permitted to caress and cuddle her, but vaginal penetration is not allowed. After Lucy falls asleep, she lies unconscious on the bed, and Clara leads in her client. After Clara reminds the man of the no-penetration rule, he strips and curls up beside Lucy.

After a few of these sessions, Lucy has enough money to move into a larger, more expensive apartment, where she lives alone. She receives a call from Birdmann, who has overdosed on painkillers. She goes to his house and finds him dying in his bed. Upon a dying man's last request, sobbing, she takes off her shirt and gets in bed with him, but he dies in her arms. At Birdmann's funeral, Lucy abruptly asks an old boyfriend if he will marry her, in an echo of Birdmann's old playful banter. The ex-boyfriend, however, not understanding the reference, takes her seriously and, shocked, refuses her, citing a number of Lucy's personal problems as his reasons.

At her next assignment with Clara, Lucy asks if she can see what happens during the sessions while she is asleep. Clara refuses, saying it will put her clients at risk of blackmail. Lucy decides to surreptitiously film her next encounter. The client is once again the first man, but this time, he also drinks the tea with a much larger dose of the sleeping drug.

The following morning, Clara comes in and checks the man's pulse, showing no surprise when he cannot be awakened. Clara tries to wake Lucy, who has overdosed as well, but she is eventually able to revive her using mouth-to-mouth resuscitation. Lucy screams when she sees the dead man in bed next to her.

The film ends with the scene captured by the hidden camera: the dead man and the sleeping girl both lying peacefully together in bed.

== Cast ==
- Emily Browning as Lucy
- Rachael Blake as Clara
- Ewen Leslie as Birdmann
- Peter Carroll as Man 1
- Chris Haywood as Man 2
- Hugh Keays-Byrne as Man 3
- Nathan Page as Businessman 2
- Sarah Snook as Flatmate
- Michael Dorman as Cook
- Daniel Webber as spy shop assistant
- Anni Finsterer as train riding hairdresser
- Benita Collings as dinner guest
- Tracy Mann as waxing beautician

== Production ==
=== Development ===
Writer and director Julia Leigh, primarily a novelist, said in an interview with Filmmaker that she initially wrote the film without the intention of directing it. In writing the script, Leigh drew from several literary inspirations, including Yasunari Kawabata's House of the Sleeping Beauties and Memories of My Melancholy Whores by Gabriel García Márquez, as well as the eponymous fairytales by Charles Perrault and The Brothers Grimm and the biblical story of an old King Solomon who had young virgins brought to him from all over his realm to sleep alongside him. She also noted the phenomenon of images of sleeping girls on fetish websites as an influence. Kawabata's novel had been adapted in 2006 by German director Vadim Glowna, as Das Haus der schlafenden Schönen (House of the Sleeping Beauties), but had been released to generally negative reviews. Additionally, Leigh was inspired to write the screenplay based on nightmares she suffered in which she dreamt she was being filmed in her sleep.

The Sleeping Beauty script made the 2008 Black List of unproduced screenplays grabbing attention in Hollywood. In September 2009 the project was approved for funding from Screen Australia.

=== Casting ===
In February 2010 it was announced that Emily Browning would play the lead role of Lucy. Mia Wasikowska was originally cast in the part, but dropped out when offered the title role in an adaptation of Jane Eyre.

Browning was drawn to the screenplay, commenting that she felt "uncomfortable" when reading it. Commenting on her character, Browning said: "I think Lucy is a nihilist and is willfully putting herself in danger." To prepare for the role, at Leigh's suggestion, Browning studied Charlotte Gainsbourg's performance in Antichrist (2009).

=== Filming ===
Principal photography on the film began on 3 April 2010, at University of Sydney, Camperdown and downtown Sydney, New South Wales, Australia.

Browning said she had no reservations about appearing nude onscreen, but she admitted the scene with the sadist character was unpleasant to film. During the filming of the scenes where Lucy is unconscious, Browning said she taught herself to meditate: "I wasn't present in those scenes at all, so they didn't really have as much effect on me."

Filmmaker Jane Campion, whom Leigh was put in contact with through Screen Australia—who funded the film—served as a mentor during the film's initial production and post-production processes. "Since I was a first time filmmaker [Screen Australia] thought it was wise that I could ask questions from her," Leigh said. "So she read the script, though she was away during the shoot—but came in post-production. Many times I called her throughout. She gave suggestions on the filmmaking process and helped in the edit to give me the impression I was on the right track."

== Release ==
Sleeping Beauty had its world premiere at the 2011 Cannes Film Festival, where it was the first Australian film entered in competition since Moulin Rouge! (2001). The film was released in Australia on 23 June 2011, distributed through Paramount Pictures and Transmission Films. On 14 September 2011, it was screened at the Toronto International Film Festival.

The film was acquired for distribution in the United States by IFC Films, and it had its premiere on 22 October 2011 at the independent BAM Festival in New York City. IFC Films subsequently gave the film a limited theatrical release in the United States on 2 December 2011.

In 2023, Leigh wrote a piece for The Sydney Morning Herald criticising the Australian Special Broadcasting Service's (SBS) public television airings of the film—as well as of other feature films—noting that the channel's implementation of numerous advertisements negatively impacted films' presentations. "The SBS audience deserves the chance to immerse themselves in a film, to be transfigured, to experience the real thing," said Leigh. "Those who can’t afford paid streaming subscriptions shouldn’t be denied access to culture. For many years SBS would only show advertisements before and after films—never mid-film—and that seemed like a smart middle path for revenue raising."

=== Home media ===
In the United Kingdom, Revolver Entertainment released the film on Blu-ray on 27 February 2012. IFC Films released the film on DVD in North America in 2012.

In May 2025, IFC Films released a North American Blu-ray edition made available via Vinegar Syndrome's online store.

== Reception ==
=== Box office ===
During its Australian theatrical run, Sleeping Beauty grossed A$300,888. In the United States, the film earned US$36,578 during its limited release in four theaters. Including sales in other international markets, the film grossed a total of US$408,680 worldwide.

=== Critical response ===
Sleeping Beauty was met with divisive reviews from film critics. On the review aggregator website Rotten Tomatoes, 48% of 97 critics' reviews are positive. The website's consensus reads: "Sleeping Beauty's provocative premise and luminous art design is hampered by a clinical, remote presentation, delivering boredom and shock in equal measure." Metacritic, which uses a weighted average, assigned the film a score of 61 out of 100, based on 20 critics, indicating "generally favorable" reviews.

Jonathan Romney of The Independent gave the film a mixed review, noting that "Leigh's debut has style, strangeness and distinction – yet for all its icy brilliance, Sleeping Beauty feels incomplete rather than truly enigmatic. But it's an intriguing piece, tantalising rather than a tease; it should keep you awake, at least." Moira Macdonald of The Seattle Times praised it as an "elegantly creepy" film designed to "leave audiences uncomfortable." Tom Charity of CNN similarly described the film as "brilliantly creepy" and praised its cinematography as "somber" and "surreal", concluding: "In the end, there’s enough here to make us see why Leigh felt compelled to turn her dream into a movie, even if this suggestive, frustratingly elusive effort is not an entirely pleasurable experience for the rest of us." The New York Times's A. O. Scott commented favorably on the film's dark humor, writing: "Though the tone is quiet and the pacing serenely unhurried, Sleeping Beauty is at times almost screamingly funny, a pointed, deadpan surrealist sex farce that Luis Buñuel might have admired."

Liam Lacey of The Globe and Mail praised the film, writing: "While it might be easy to dismiss Sleeping Beauty as an exercise in chilly titillation, that undervalues the precision of Leigh's technique, and her story-teller's slippery refusal to play to ideological expectations. At its simple core, Sleeping Beauty is a perfectly pitched chamber piece about the menace of voluntary oblivion."

SBS Australia's Fiona Williams felt the story failed to successfully translate to a feature film, noting that the "screenplay struggles to stay interesting, and wants for the evocative passages that are an author’s pathway to character and narrative development. We have little sense of Lucy beyond a series of repetitive actions that on the surface, paint her as an aloof party girl with cashflow problems. But surface is all we have." David Jenkins of Time Out made a similar observation that "when Leigh lets her literary instincts take over, such as a flowery monologue by one of the old men, the film is at its weakest," but awarded the film four out of five stars and praised Browning's "rigorously passive performance [that] imbues her character with immense depth and mystery. She gives her body over to Leigh with the same reckless abandon that her character does in this singular film."

Peter Debruge of Variety gave the film an unfavorable review, describing it as "maddeningly elliptical, depriving auds of virtually any of the details they need to understand, much less relate to the character. It’s fair to call Browning brave for taking on this role, but she’s too wooden and inexpressive here to invite us into Lucy’s interior space." Stan Hall of The Oregonian found the film derivative and lacking suspense, describing is as "another entrant in the ranks of unsexy, nonthrilling erotic thrillers, a kind of blend of Belle de Jour and Eyes Wide Shut that captures some of those films' refracted light but is too inscrutable to express any concrete ideas of its own." Writing for The Age, Tom Ryan found the film's "distant" storytelling ineffective, writing: "Leigh, better known as a novelist, here creates a world devoid of tenderness or altruism of any kind. Her film is certainly intriguing, but it doesn't make for easy viewing and its misanthropy is deeply unsettling."

=== Accolades ===
Institution	Year	Category	Recipient(s)	Result	Ref.
AACTA Awards	2012	Best Cinematography	Geoffrey Simpson	Nominated	
AACTA Awards	2012	Best Costume Design	Annie Beauchamp	Nominated	
AACTA Awards	2012	Best Production Design	Annie Beauchamp	Nominated	
Alliance of Women Film Journalists	2012	Most Egregious Age Difference Between the Leading Man and the Love Interest	Emily Browning; Peter Carroll; Chris Haywood; Hugh Keays-Byrne	Nominated	
Australian Directors Guild	2012	Best Direction in a Feature Film	Julia Leigh	Won	
Australian Film Critics Association Awards	2012	Best Australian Film	Sleeping Beauty	Nominated	
Australian Film Critics Association Awards	2012	Best Actress	Emily Browning	Nominated	
Australian Film Critics Association Awards	2012	Best Director	Julia Leigh	Nominated	
Australian Film Critics Association Awards	2012	Best Screenplay	Julia Leigh	Nominated	
Bergen International Film Festival	2011	Jury Award – Best Film	Julia Leigh	Nominated	
Bermuda International Film Festival	2012	Best Film – Audience Choice	Julia Leigh	Nominated	
Calgary International Film Festival	2011	Best International Feature	Julia Leigh	Nominated	
Calgary International Film Festival	2011	People's Choice Award	Julia Leigh	Nominated	
Cambridge Film Festival	2011	Best Film – Audience Award	Julia Leigh	Nominated	
Cannes Film Festival	2011	Caméra d'Or	Julia Leigh	Nominated	
Cannes Film Festival	2011	Palme d'Or	Julia Leigh	Nominated	
Chicago International Film Festival	2011	Best Film – Audience Choice	Julia Leigh	Nominated	
Film Critics Circle of Australia Awards	2012	Best Leading Actress	Emily Browning	Nominated	
Hamburg Film Festival	2011	Critics Award	Julia Leigh	Nominated	
Hamptons Film Festival	2011	Breakthrough Performer	Emily Browning	Won	
Santa Fe Film Festival	2011	Best Film – Audience Award	Julia Leigh	Won	
Sarlat International Cinema Festival	2011	Coup de coeur	Julia Leigh	Nominated	
Sarlat International Cinema Festival	2011	Prix Aquitaine – Feature Film	Julia Leigh	Nominated	
Sarlat International Cinema Festival	2011	Youth Jury Prize	Julia Leigh	Nominated	
Sitges Film Festival	2011	Best Film	Julia Leigh	Nominated	
Sitges Film Festival	2011	Special Jury Prize – Feature Film	Julia Leigh	Nominated	
Sitges Film Festival	2011	Best Director	Julia Leigh	Nominated	
Stockholm Film Festival	2011	Best Film – Honorable Mention	Julia Leigh	Won	
Stockholm Film Festival	2011	Bronze Horse	Julia Leigh	Nominated	
Sydney Film Festival	2011	Best Film	Julia Leigh	Nominated	
Transilvania International Film Festival	2012	Best Director	Julia Leigh	Nominated	
Transilvania International Film Festival	2012	Best Film – Audience Award	Julia Leigh	Nominated	
