= Tang Yuemei =

Chinese translator (1931–2023)

- 唐月梅
- Born: May 5, 1931; Cholon, French Indo-China
- Died: January 7, 2023 (aged 91); San Francisco, California, U.S.
- Education: Peking University
- Occupations: Translator, academic
- Spouse: Ye Weiqu (m. 1956–2005)
- Writing career
- Language: Chinese, Japanese
- Period: 1978–2023
- Genre: Novel
- Notable work: The Sound of Waves
- Notable awards: 1st National Book Award

Tang Yuemei (Chinese: 唐月梅; pinyin: Táng Yuèméi; May 5, 1931 – January 7, 2023) was a Chinese translator of Chinese Vietnamese ethnicity. Tang was a visiting professor at Yokohama City University. She is most notable for being one of the main translators into Chinese of the works of the Japanese novelists Yukio Mishima and Takiji Kobayashi.

== Life and career ==
Tang was born into a Chinese Vietnamese family in Cholon, French Indo-China in 1931, with her ancestral home in Hainan. In 1956, Tang graduated from Peking University, where she majored in Japanese at the Department of East Language and Literature. After graduation, Tang was appointed to the Chinese Academy of Social Sciences. In 1966, the Cultural Revolution was launched by Mao Zedong, Tang and her husband Ye Weiqu's whole collection of books was burned by the Red Guards, the couple were sent to the May Seventh Cadre Schools to work in Henan. In 1976, Hua Guofeng and Ye Jianying toppled the Gang of Four, the couple were rehabilitated by Deng Xiaoping, at the same time, they started to study Japanese literature. Tang started to publish works in 1978 and she joined the China Writers Association in 1982.

In 1956, Tang married her middle school sweetheart Ye Weiqu in Beijing, he was also a translator. Tang died in San Francisco on January 7, 2023, at the age of 91.

== Works ==
- The History of Japanese Drama (日本戏剧史)
- The Sound of Waves (Yukio Mishima) (潮骚)
- The Temple of the Golden Pavilion (Yukio Mishima) (金阁寺)
- The Sea of Fertility (Yukio Mishima) (春雪)
- Confessions of a Mask (Yukio Mishima) (假面自白)
- Thirst for Love (Yukio Mishima) (爱的饥渴)
- (Yukio Mishima) (太阳与铁)
- (Toyoko Yamasaki) (沙门良宽)
- The History of Japanese Literature (Toyoko Yamasaki) (日本文学史)
- Karei-naru Ichizoku (Toyoko Yamasaki) (浮华世家)
- The Old Capital (Takiji Kobayashi) (古都)
- (Takiji Kobayashi) (湖)
- (Takiji Kobayashi) (舞姬)
- The House of the Sleeping Beauties (Takiji Kobayashi) (睡美人)

== Awards ==
- Karei-naru Ichizoku – 1st National Book Award
- Chinese Translation Association – Competent Translator (2004)
