= Tanpopo (disambiguation) =

Tanpopo (kanji: 蒲公英, hiragana: たんぽぽ, katakana: タンポポ), also transliterated as Tampopo, is the Japanese word for dandelion.

Tanpopo or Tampopo may refer specifically to:

== Arts and media ==
=== Literature ===
- Tanpopo (novel), 1972 novel by Yasunari Kawabata
- Tanpopo Yamazaki (山崎たんぽぽ), heroine of Yuu Watase's 2000–2001 manga Imadoki!

=== Film, television, and theater ===
- Tampopo, 1985 Japanese film by Juzo Itami
- Tanpopo (comedy duo), consisting of Emiko Kawamura and Kumiko Shiratori, regular members of Japanese variety show Mecha-Mecha Iketeru!
- Gekidan Tanpopo, AKA Dandelion Theatre Company, founded by Sayuri Yōko

=== Music ===
- Tanpopo, a Hello! Project sub-group of Japanese idol girl group Morning Musume
- Tanpopo (song), 1999 single by Tanpopo from Tanpopo 1
- Tanpopo (Yusuke Kamiji song), the number-one digital single on June 30, 2009, in Japan, by Yusuke Kamiji
- Tanpopo (1975 single), by Hiromi Ōta
- Tanpopo (2002 single), by 19 (band)

== Other uses ==
- Tanpopo mission, 2015–2018 astrobiology experiment on the International Space Station
