= Onsen geisha =

Term for geisha working in hot spring resorts or towns

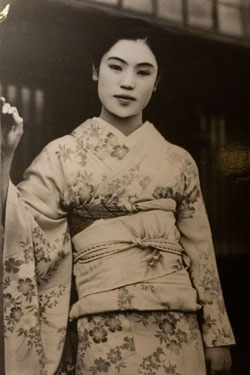
Onsen geisha Matsuei of Yuzawa, Niigata, upon whom Yasunari Kawabata based one of the main characters in his 1934 novel Snow Country

Onsen geisha (温泉芸者) is the Japanese term for geisha working in onsen (hot spring) resorts or towns, known for their traditions of performance and entertainment style, which differ significantly to geisha working in other areas of Japan.

Historically, the term "onsen geisha" has held mostly negative connotations with sex work, and has come to be synonymous with "sex worker" for a number of reasons, despite prostitution being made illegal in Japan in the 1950s.

Despite connotations of low standards of performing arts, modern onsen geisha hold the same training in the arts as geisha from other regions of Japan.

== Early to mid-20th century ==
In early to mid-20th century Japan, onsen geisha were geisha living and working in the hot spring resort towns of Japan.

Because of the transient nature of hot spring resort guests - who, unlike the patrons of geisha elsewhere, were unlikely to patronise the same geisha over a long period of time - the term "onsen geisha", and the entertainment offered by onsen geisha, came to be regarded negatively, as onsen geisha were not bound by contracts, were unlikely to build a steady clientele of repeat customers, were not bound by the geisha "lineages" seen elsewhere and were regarded as the least-artistically educated, the implication being that guests of onsen geisha sought them out not for their skills in the traditional arts, but for their availability as sex workers. Onsen geisha were also able to move from town to town easily, a factor aided by their lack of a contract tying them down to any one okiya.

During this period, some onsen geisha were sponsored by businessmen who made yearly visits; these patrons were known as danna. Sayo Masuda, an onsen geisha in the late 1930s and early 1940s and author of Autobiography of a Geisha, the first book of any kind about the geisha lifestyle, wrote that a typical geisha's contract was bought out by a patron for about 30 yen (around 20,000 yen today) and never for more than 100. Interaction with other customers beyond party entertainment was common; therefore, the concept of onsen geisha as sex workers was not entirely incorrect in the earlier half of the 20th century.

Masuda wrote that onsen geisha in this time would be taught some traditional geisha skills, but were also frequently pressured into having sex. Graduation to full geisha status for onsen geisha always involved mizuage - losing one's virginity to a patron or other paying customer - and unscrupulous okiya mothers could sell a girl's virginity a number of times to customers who would be none the wiser.

Some geisha would compete amongst themselves for their standards and who they would sleep with, but, as Masuda details, this likely originated from making the most of a poor and sometimes exploitative situation, in some ways further bolstering the perception of onsen geisha as sex workers:

Karuta was a first-rate Elder Sister: she had standards and would never sleep with any man other than her danna. This was not from a sense of feminine virtue; it was a sad sort of pride. This "geisha's pride" wasn't worth a broken straw sandal, of course, but - under the influence of Karuta, I suppose - its hollow conceits took root in my mind.

Masuda notes that many onsen geisha of this time has serious problems with alcohol due to the sake drinking contests which frequently formed a significant part of their work through parties. Drinking problems frequently persisted in many onsen geisha even after retirement.

== Post-World War II ==
In the period following World War II, the abundance of sex workers in onsen towns such as Atami marketing themselves to American GIs and tourists as "geisha" led to misconceptions surrounding geisha and sex workers. Many foreign visitors to Japan, unfamiliar with the traditions of appearance separating geisha from sex workers, were unable to distinguish between the two, as both wore kimono and were seen to entertain men.

Following the passing of the Prostitution Prevention Law in 1956, and its enforcement in 1958, sex work became illegal to practice in Japan, preventing onsen geisha from practicing or being forced into sex work without legal repercussions. In the present day, onsen geisha do not practice sex work as part of their profession as geisha.

== Modern onsen geisha ==
Though geisha across Japan hold an equal dedication to training in the traditional arts, geisha banquets in onsen towns are markedly different from geisha engagements in the more traditional hanamachi (geisha communities) of Kyoto and Tokyo.

Whereas geisha parties in Kyoto are usually small affairs in teahouses with five or six geisha, onsen geisha usually entertain tourists in the banquet halls of large hotels, often with 60 or 70 geisha in attendance. Instead of being called to teahouses and parties around the area by customers who likely already know them, onsen geisha are employed to work at one establishment, likely a hotel in the area, and are called upon by guests who do not know them, paying for a dinner or party with geisha entertainment.

Geisha are contracted to work for a specific amount of time based upon the paying customer, and unlike other geisha parties, leave when this time is up. The modern surge of tourism, expendable income, and capitalisation has caused onsen geisha, who historically entertained groups similar in size to those in Kyoto and Tokyo, to increase the size of parties to larger and more profitable banquets such as these.

In Atami, the official registry office regards long-time, proven geisha as separate from those who have not yet completed their first year.

== See also ==
- Oiran
