= I'm Not Here to Give a Speech =

2010 book by Gabriel García Márquez

- Editor: Cristóbal Pera
- Author: Gabriel García Márquez
- Original title: Yo no vengo a decir un discurso
- Subject: Twenty-two of García Márquez's speeches from 1940 to 2007.
- Genre: Narrative, Chronicle
- Publisher: Mondadori
- Publication date: 29 October 2010
- Publication place: Barcelona, Spain

I'm Not Here to Give a Speech (Spanish: Yo no vengo a decir un discurso) is a book by Gabriel García Márquez presented on 29 October 2010 and published by Mondadori, which brings together twenty-two texts by the Colombian author. It covers a period from 1944, with the author's first speech at the age of seventeen on the occasion of his graduation from the Liceo de Zipaquirá, to 2007, with his talk in Mexico before the Academies of the Language and the King and Queen of Spain. The title of the book refers to that first speech, which began by stating: "Generally, in all social events like this one, a person is designated to give a speech. That person always seeks the most appropriate topic and develops it before those present. I have not come to give a speech."

The work was published six years after his last book Memories of My Melancholy Whores and was the last one released before his death in 2014. Most of the included texts were previously unpublished and covered various subjects, such as "the problems of Colombia, nuclear proliferation or ecological disasters, even the future of youth and education in Latin America." Among others, it included The Solitude of Latin America, the speech he gave upon receiving the Nobel Prize in Literature, The Best Job in the World, for the 52nd Assembly of the Inter American Press Association in 1996, his lecture How I Began to Write, delivered in Caracas in 1970, For You, on the occasion of his receiving the Rómulo Gallegos Prize for One Hundred Years of Solitude, as well as his tributes to other writers, such as Álvaro Mutis and Julio Cortázar.

== See also ==
- Bibliography of Gabriel García Márquez
- No One Writes to the Colonel
