= Alan Raitt =

Alan Raitt FRSL FBA
- Born: Alan William Raitt; 21 September 1930
- Died: 2 September 2006 (aged 75)
- Awards: Fellow of the Royal Society of Literature (1971); Fellow of the British Academy (1992); Ordre des Palmes Académiques (1995)

Academic background
- Education: The King Edward VI School, Morpeth
- Alma mater: Magdalen College, Oxford
- Thesis: (1957)
- Doctoral advisor: Austin Gill

Academic work
- Discipline: French literature
- Sub-discipline: 19th-century French literature
- Institutions: Magdalen College, Oxford; Exeter College, Oxford; University of Oxford

Alan William Raitt, FRSL, FBA (21 September 1930 – 2 September 2006) was a British scholar of French literature, specialising in nineteenth-century French literature. From 1992 to 1997, he was Professor of French Literature at the University of Oxford.

== Early life and education ==
Raitt was born on 21 September 1930 in Morpeth, Northumberland, England. He was educated at The King Edward VI School, Morpeth, then an all-boys state grammar school. He studied Modern Languages (French and German) at Magdalen College, Oxford, graduating with a first class Bachelor of Arts (BA) degree in 1951. His undergraduate tutor had been Austin Gill. He remained at Magdalen College to undertake postgraduate research on "Villiers de l'Isle-Adam and the Symbolist movement", completing his Doctor of Philosophy (DPhil) degree in 1957.

== Academic career ==
From 1953 to 1955, Raitt was a Fellow (by examination) of Magdalen College, Oxford. From 1955 to 1966, he was Fellow of Exeter College, Oxford. In 1966, he returned to Magdalen College where he had been elected a fellow, and would remain there until his retirement in 1997; that year he was elected Fellow Emeritus. He also held a number of positions at university level in the University of Oxford: he was a Special Lecturer in French Literature from 1976 to 1979, Reader from French Literature from 1979 to 1992, and Professor of French Literature from 1992 to 1997.

Raitt also held a number of appointments outside of Oxford. He was visiting lecturer at the University of Georgia in 1986. He was Visiting Professor at the Paris-Sorbonne University from 1987 to 1988. From 1987 to 1997, he was General Editor of French Studies, the journal of the Society for French Studies.

== Personal life ==
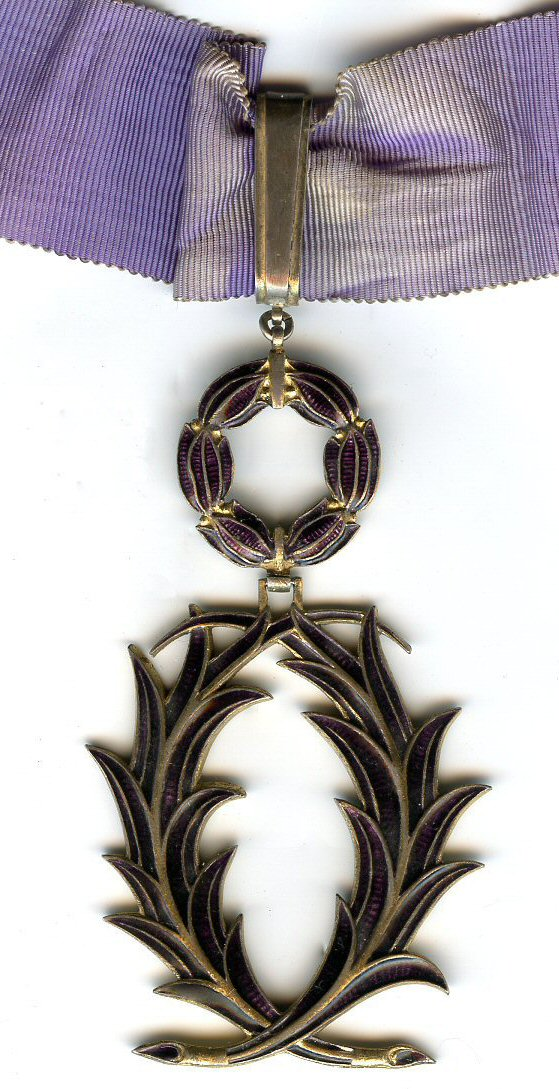
Neck decoration of the Commandeur de l'Ordre des Palmes Académiques

In 1959, Raitt married Janet Taylor. Together, they had two daughters. They divorced in 1971. In 1974, he married Lia Noémia Rodrigues Correia; she outlived him.

== Honours ==
In 1971, Raitt was a Fellow of the Royal Society of Literature (FRSL). In 1992, he was elected a Fellow of the British Academy (FBA), the UK's national academy for the humanities and the social sciences. In 1995, he was appointed a Commandeur de l'Ordre des Palmes Académiques (Commander of the Order of Academic Palms) by the French government.

== Selected works ==
- Raitt, A. W. (1965). Life and Letters in France: the nineteenth century. New York: Scribner's. ISBN 978-0684126197.
- Raitt, A. W. (1981). The life of Villiers de l'Isle-Adam. Oxford: Clarendon. ISBN 978-0198157717.
- Flaubert, Gustave (1994). Raitt, Alan (ed.). Pour Louis Bouilhet. Exeter: University of Exeter Press. ISBN 978-0859894418.
- Raitt, Alan (1996). A.C. Friedel et "Le nouveau théâtre allemand": un intermédiaire méconnu (in French). Amsterdam: Rodopi. ISBN 978-9051837766.
- Raitt, Alan (1999). Flaubert et le théâtre (in French) (2nd ed.). Berne: P. Lang. ISBN 978-3906763194.
- Raitt, Alan (2002). The originality of Madame Bovary. Oxford: Verlag Peter Lang. ISBN 978-3906768441.
- Raitt, Alan (2005). Gustavus Flaubertus Bourgeoisophobus: Flaubert and the bourgeois mentality. Oxford: Verlag Peter Lang. ISBN 978-3039103089.
