= Shōnen (novel) =

Novella by Yasunari Kawabata

- Author: Yasunari Kawabata
- Language: Japanese
- Genre: Autobiographical fiction
- Publication date: 1952
- Publication place: Japan

Shōnen is a Japanese novel by Yasunari Kawabata. It was first published in a serialized form between 1948 and 1949 and later as a book in 1952. The work is based on a series of documents purportedly written by Kawabata during his youth and explores his attraction to an androgynous male schoolmate named Kiyono.

Due to the numerous biographical similarities between the protagonist and the author, the work has been regarded by several critics as an authentic document written by Kawabata in his youth and as a biographical source for this period of his life. Other scholars, however, have interpreted it as a work of fiction.

== Synopsis ==
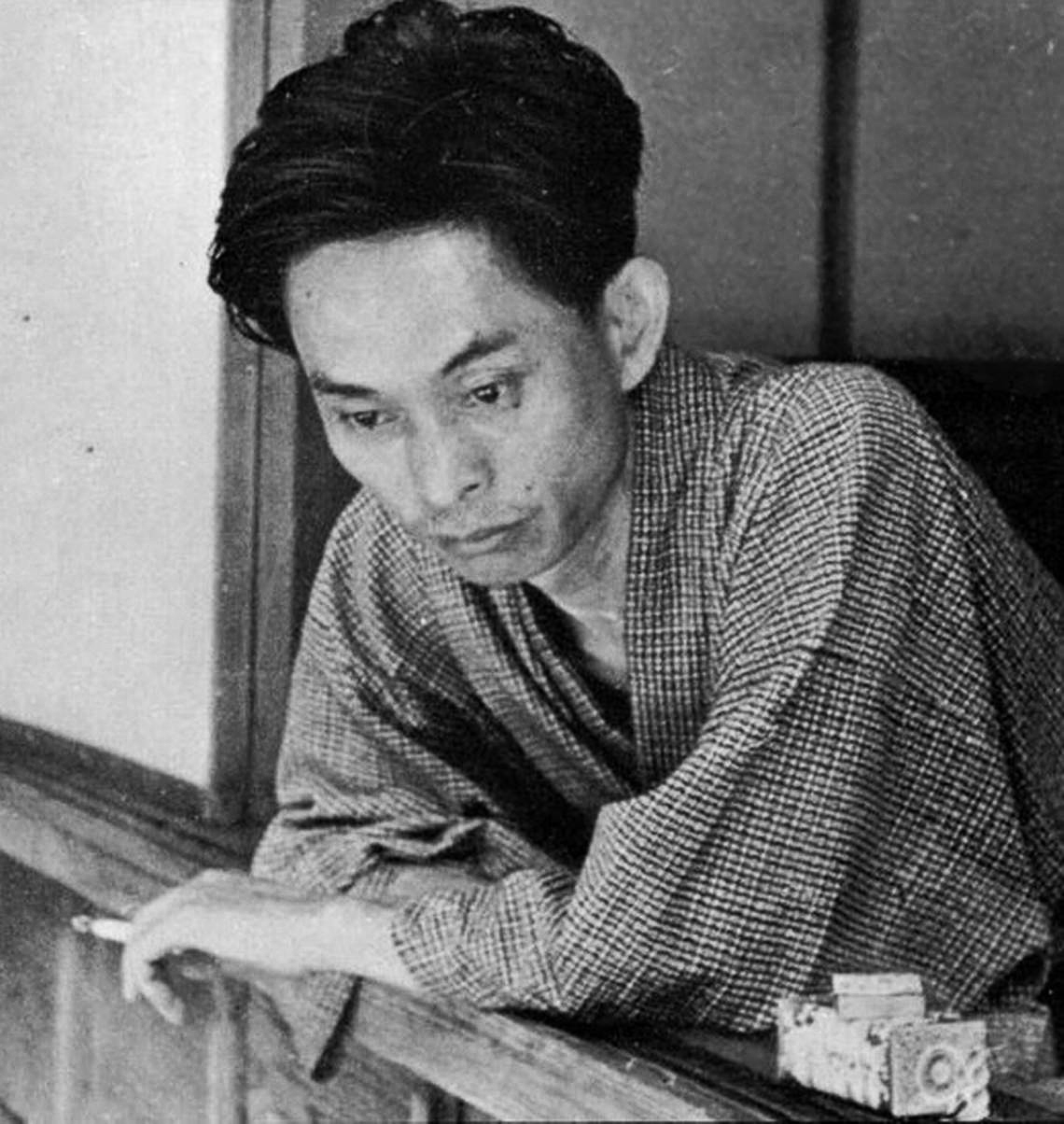
Author Yasunari Kawabata

Miyamoto Yasunari, a 50-year-old writer, is preparing to publish a commemorative edition of his collected works. While reviewing his unpublished writings, he discovers dating from his school years, including a diary and letters exchanged between himself and a boy named Kiyono, who was three years younger than him and with whom he shared a room at a boarding school for a year. The journal entries, dated between 18 September 1916 and 22 January 1917, focus on the intense attraction the protagonist feels toward Kiyono and the eroticism present in their interactions.

Despite his closeness, the narrator makes clear in his diary that the relationship between the two never became sexual, although he occasionally suspects that Kiyono had sexual encounters with other boys. The protagonist further acknowledges that, from a young age, he had been attracted to other males, including several boys at the boarding school whom he describes as possessing a "female charm". At the same time, however, he is conflicted by this attraction, which leads him to wish that Kiyono were a woman and that his feelings would therefore not be subject to judgment.

== Characters ==
Miyamoto Yasunari is the protagonist of the story. He shares numerous biographical similarities with the author. In addition to bearing a similar name, he is portrayed as a writer, and the text refers to the composition of several works published by Kawabata. Like the character, Kawabata was in the process of publishing a commemorative collection of his works at the time of publication of Shōnen, and both are also portrayed as orphans.

Kiyono is a boy three years younger than the protagonist and with whom he shares a room in the boarding school. His family belongs to the Ōmoto religion, and his home serves as a religious centre, although Kiyono himself is not devout. While his handwriting and mannerisms are described as "feminine", the protagonist also repeatedly emphasizes his masculine qualities, including the fact that he is a kendo champion.
