= Austin Gill =

British scholar (1906–1990)

Austin Gill CBE
- Born: 3 September 1906; Stockport, England
- Died: 21 March 1990 (aged 83)
- Title: Marshall Professor of French (1966 to 1971)

Academic background
- Education: University of Manchester

Academic work
- Discipline: French
- Sub-discipline: French language Culture of France; 19th-century French literature
- Institutions: University of Edinburgh; British Council; Magdalen College, Oxford; University of Glasgow
- Notable students: Alan Raitt

Austin Gill, CBE (3 September 1906 – 21 March 1990) was a British scholar of the French language and culture. He was the Marshall Professor of French at the University of Glasgow from 1966 to 1971.

Gill's family was of Irish extraction, but he was born in Stockport, England, which is just southeast of Manchester proper. Gill matriculated at the University of Manchester where he studied French and played football. After graduation, he went on to study first at Grenoble, where he played centre-half for FC Grenoble, and then in Paris. In France, Gill was a Faulkner Fellow from 1930 to 1931 and a then back in Manchester a Langton Fellow from 1931 to 1933. In 1933 he accepted a lecturer position at the University of Edinburgh. In 1943 he was sent to North Africa as the British Council's Representative (head of office), and in August 1944 was sent to France to reopen the Paris office.

In 1945 Gill left the British Council, and was hired at Magdalen College, Oxford, as a tutor in modern languages. From 1950 to 1954 he returned to the British Council and was director of the British Institute in Paris. In 1955 he was honored by being made a Commander of the Order of the British Empire. That year he returned to Magdalen College where he continued to teach until 1966, when he accepted the Marshall Chair of French at the University of Glasgow.

Gill's speciality was in French literature of the 19th century notably poetry, and especially that of Stéphane Mallarmé. When he retired in 1971 it was in order to pursue that research interest.

== Obituaries ==
- The Independent (28 March 1990)
- The Guardian (5 April 1990)
- The Times (7 April 1990)
