= The Scarlet Gang of Asakusa =

1930 novel by Yasunari Kawabata

- Author: Yasunari Kawabata
- Original title: 浅草紅團; Asakusa Kurenaidan
- Language: Japanese
- Genre: Novel
- Publication date: (Newspaper serialization); 1930 (Full publication)
- Publication place: Japan
- English publication date: 2005
- Media type: Print

The Scarlet Gang of Asakusa (浅草紅團, Asakusa Kurenaidan) is a novel by the Japanese author Yasunari Kawabata. It was originally serialized in a newspaper before eventually being compiled into a novel in 1930.

== Plot ==
In the 1920s, Asakusa was to Tokyo what Montmartre had been to 1890s Paris, Alexanderplatz was to 1920s Berlin and Times Square was to be to 1940s New York. The Scarlet Gang of Asakusa was originally serialized in the Tokyo daily newspaper Tokyo Asahi between 20 December 1929 and February 16, 1930. The novel, told from the point of view of a wandering narrator and the cast of mostly female juvenile offenders and wrongdoers who show him their way of life, describes an entertainment district where beggars and teenage sex-workers mixed with revue dancers and famous authors.

Markedly different from Kawabata's later work, The Scarlet Gang of Asakusa was greatly influenced by Western modernism.

== Publication history ==
The original newspaper serialization was incomplete. Only chapters 1 through 37 were published in Tokyo Asahi. The remaining sections were published concurrently in two literary journals, Reconstruction (Kaizō, volume 12, number 9) and New Currents (Shinchō, volume 27, number 9).

The first translation of this novel was into German by Richmod Bollinger in 1999, as Die Rote Bande von Asakusa (Frankfurt: Insel) ISBN 9783458169697.

The annotated English translation of this novel by Alisa Freedman, first published in 2005, includes the original illustrations by Ota Saburo and a foreword and an afterword by Donald Richie.

The Italian translation by Constantine Pes, was published as La banda di Asakusa by Einaudi in 2007. ISBN 978-88-06-18017-1

Meiko Shimon in Brazil translated the novel into Portuguese as A Gangue Escarlate de Asakusa by Estação Liberdade in 2013. ISBN 978-8574482262
