= One Arm =

- Short story by Yasunari Kawabata
- Original title: Kataude
- Translator: E. Seidensticker (1967)
- Country: Japan
- Language: Japanese
- Genre(s): Magic realism

Publication
- Published in: Shinchō
- Publication type: Magazine
- Media type: Print
- Publication date: 1964
- Published in English: 1967

One Arm (かたうで, Kataude) is a short story by Japanese writer and Nobel Prize winner Yasunari Kawabata. It appeared in serialised form in the literary magazine Shinchō in 1963 and 1964. It has been considered as a main example of the current of magic realism in Japanese Literature.

== Plot ==
A young woman removes her right arm and gives it to a man (the protagonist) to keep for the night. The story follows his thoughts and actions as he takes it home. He talks to and caresses it, and then decides to replace his own arm with it. The "relationship" the man has with the severed arm serves as a portal into the landscape of memory and emotions.

== Translations ==
The story was first translated into English as One Arm by Edward Seidensticker and published in Japan Quarterly in 1967. It later was reprinted in House of the Sleeping Beauties and Other Stories, Kodansha 1969.
