= House of the Sleeping Beauties =

German feature film by Vadim Glowna

The House of the Sleeping Beauties
- Das Haus der schlafenden Schönen
- Directed by: Vadim Glowna
- Screenplay by: Vadim Glowna
- Produced by: Raymond Tarabay; Vadim Glowna
- Starring: Vadim Glowna; Angela Winkler; Maximilian Schell
- Cinematography: Ciro Cappellari
- Edited by: Charles Lézin
- Music by: Nikolaus Glowna; Siggi Mueller
- Release date: November 2, 2006
- Running time: 99 minutes
- Country: Germany
- Language: German

The House of Sleeping Beauties is a German drama feature film starring and directed by Vadim Glowna. Released in 2006, the film is the third film adaptation of the 1961 novella The House of the Sleeping Beauties (眠れる美女, Nemureru Bijo) by Japanese Nobel laureate Yasunari Kawabata. Other leading cast are Maximilian Schell and Angela Winkler.

== Plot ==
Fifteen years after Edmond's wife and daughter are killed in a terrible car crash, the "wealthy businessman in his late 60's" assumes it was suicide and blames himself for their deaths. Attempting to help the lonely Edmond out of depression, his friend Kogi recommends the House of the Sleeping Beauties, a type of brothel with strict rules: no rape, no contact with awake women, and no questions.

Edmond visits the club with increasing frequency, spending night after night next to different beautiful drugged women. He touches them, caresses them, even licks them, which arouses him but never truly satisfying for him. He talks to the sleeping women about death and about women in general, primarily about his mother. As Edmond's addiction to the place grows, so does his desire to break the rules. Then he happens to notice a corpse being removed from the brothel.

== Cast ==
- Vadim Glowna – Edmond
- Maximilian Schell – Kogi
- Angela Winkler – Madame
- Birol Ünel – Mr. Gold
- Mona Glass – Secretary
- Marina Weis – Maid
- Benjamin Cabuk – Singer
- Peter Luppa – Preacher
- Benjamin Seidel – Benni
- Maxime Foerste – Maxime
- Jaqueline le Saunier – Girl 1
- Babet Mader – Girl 2
- Maria Burghardt – Girl 3
- Linda Elsner – Girl 4
- Sarah Swenshon – Girl 5
- Isabelle Wackers – Girl 6

== Reception ==
The film received positive comments regarding its tone, scenery, and music soundtrack. However, its overall reception was mixed at best. Maximilian Schell's performance was praised, but in the US, the film was reviewed mostly poorly. As of 2025, the film has a Metascore of 21, with only one critic in the list, Vincent Musetto from the New York Post, giving a positive review for its "deeper purpose as — in the words of the director, Vadim Glowna — a meditation on 'transition, remembrance, mourning, guilt, loneliness, sex and death, eroticism and dying.'" However, the paltry four user ratings are universally positive, scoring 10/10. Although The New York Times critic Jeannette Catsoulis disliked the film, she admitted scenes were "seductively filmed" and was "creepily mesmerizing", and critic Alan C. Stone of Big Picture Big Sound agrees with her assessment. Despite a negative overall assessment, Stone praised the production as "artfully made," noting that several sequences were "visually stunning." Frank Sheck at The Hollywood Reporter characterized the film as "one of those self-consciously atmospheric literary adaptations that suffer from a surfeit of symbolism and pretentiousness" that also is "even less successful [in its] brief foray into thriller territory". Roger Ebert considered the film "repugnant" and had a difficult time believing the protagonist can be so lonely and depressed but also the head of a large corporation. Vadim Rizov at The Village Voice considered the film "one of [that] year’s worst releases."

== Honors and awards ==
The House of Sleeping Beauties was shortlisted with six other films for Germany's Oscar candidate for 2007, but it lost to The Edge of Heaven.
