= Alan Martin Boase =

British literary scholar (1902–1982)

- Born: 23 June 1902; St. Andrews, Scotland
- Died: 7 November 1982 (aged 80)
- Title: Marshall Professor of French (1937 to 1966)
- Spouse: Grizelle Forster
- Parent(s): William Norman, Mabel Margaret

Academic work
- Discipline: French literature

Alan Martin Boase (/boʊz/, 23 June 1902 – 7 November 1982) was a British Romance studies and literary scholar of Scottish origin., Marshall Professor of French at the University of Glasgow. He was a specialist on the French Renaissance writer Michel de Montaigne, and the French metaphysical poet Jean de Sponde.

== Biography ==
Alan Martin Boase, was born on 23 June 1902 in Rathalpin, St. Andrews. His father was William Norman Boase C.B.E. (1870-1938), Provost at St. Andrews from 1927 to 1936, and President of the famous St. Andrews golf club. His mother was the writer Mabel Margaret Boase. Alan Boase was educated at Eton, then at New College, Oxford before completing his doctoral studies at Trinity College, Cambridge and the Sorbonne. In 1929, he was appointed to a lectureship at Sheffield where he met his wife Grizelle Forster, daughter of the Professor of Classics at Sheffield, E. S. Forster (1879-1950).

In 1936, Boase was appointed chair of French at Southampton, but returned to Scotland the following year as Marshall Professor of French at the University of Glasgow where he remained until his retirement in 1966.

His initial specialism was in 16th and 17th century French literature, and in particular Montaigne and Jean de Sponde. But he also keenly pursued interests outside his special field of The Renaissance, in education, drama, fine art, history, politics and contemporary writing. After retirement, he remained a committee chairman at the French Institute in Edinburgh. . He died in Edinburgh on 7 November 1982.

== Honours ==
He was made an Officer of the Legion of Honour by the French government and in 1979 won the Prix du Rayonnement français, awarded by the Académie française. He became an honorary fellow of the Collège de France in 1974

== Books & Anthologies ==
- Montaigne, Selected Essays, Arthur Tilley & A. M. Boase (ed.) Manchester University Press, 1934.
- The Fortunes of Montaigne: A History of the Essays in France 1580-1669. London, Methuen, 1935.
- Jean Cocteau, La Machine infernale with a preface by Alan M. Boase, London, Nelson, 1944.
- Sponde, Sonnets et Stances de la Mort, introduction de Alan Boase, Paris, Corti, 1948.
- Sponde, Poésies. Texte établi par Alan Boase et François Ruchon. Avec une ‘Etude sur les poésies de Jean de Sponde’ par Alan Boase, Geneva, Cailler, 1949.
- Sponde, Méditations, avec un Essai de Poèmes chrétiens Introduction de Alan Boase, Paris, Corti, 1954 including a long section within the introduction, pp. xiii-xcix, on ‘La Vie de Sponde’
- The Poetry of France (4 volumes). London, Methuen 1964-1967

== Selected articles ==
- “Then Malherbe came”, Criterion, X 1930–1931, pp. 287–306.
- “Interpretation of Les Lettres persanes”, in The French Mind. Studies in honour of Gustave Rudler, ed. Will Moore, Rhoda Sutherland and Enid Starkie, Oxford, Clarendon Press, 1952, pp. 152–69.
- “Tradition and Revaluation in the French Anthology, 1692-1960” in Essays presented to C. M. Girdlestone, University of Durham, 1960, pp. 51–63.
- “Leçons sur le ballet de cour” Neohelicon 7, 61–144 (1979) (based on invited lectures at the Collège de France on art and mythology in the ballet de cour and its English counterparts)
