= The Old Capital =

Novel by Yasunari Kawabata

- Author: Yasunari Kawabata
- Original title: 古都; Koto
- Translator: J. Martin Holman
- Language: Japanese
- Publication date: 1962
- Publication place: Japan
- English publication date: 1987 (North Point Press, San Francisco)
- Media type: Print (Hardcover)

The Old Capital (古都, Koto) (Note: Translated English title of the Japanese Koto (古都), which refers to the city of Kyoto (京都), Japan's capital until 1868.) is a novel by Japanese writer Yasunari Kawabata first published in 1962. It was one of three novels cited by the Nobel Committee in their decision to award Kawabata the 1968 Nobel Prize in Literature.

The Old Capital was first translated into English in 1987 by J. Martin Holman. A revised edition of Holman's translation was published in February 2006.

== Plot ==
Chieko Sada is the daughter of Takichiro and Shige, who operate a wholesale dry goods shop in the Nakagyo Ward of Kyoto. Now twenty, Chieko has known since she was in middle school that she was a foundling adopted by Takichiro and Shige. However, as told by Shige, they snatched Chieko when she was a baby "Under the cherry blossoms at night at Gion Shrine". The discrepancy on whether Chieko was a foundling or stolen is part of the plot and is revealed later in the story.

Soon after a chance encounter at Yasaka Shrine, Chieko learns of a twin sister Naeko, who had remained in her home village in Kitayama working in the mountain forests of cryptomeria north of the city. The identical looks of Chieko and Naeko confuse Hideo, a traditional weaver, who is one potential suitor of Chieko. The novel, one of the last that Kawabata completed before his death, examines themes common to much of his literature: aging and decline; old culture in the commercial new Japan; the muted expression of strong yet repressed emotion; the role of accident and misunderstanding in shaping lives.

The story is set in Kyoto, and incorporates various festivals celebrated there. One of these is the Gion festival which occurs in the book during July. As part of the Gion festival, there is a parade of floats constructed by various neighborhoods in Kyoto and one of Chieko's fond memories is of Shin'ichi, who is also interested in Chieko, participating as a festival boy. The Festival of the Ages is another important festival and this is where Hideo takes Chieko's twin, Naeko, to view the parade.

== Reception ==
Although Kawabata did not consider it his best work, it shares the same themes as his other novels. The Old Capital was one of three novels cited by the Nobel Committee in awarding the 1968 Prize for Literature to Kawabata. The other two were Snow Country and Thousand Cranes.

== Adaptations ==
The novel was adapted in 1963 into a Japanese feature film known in English under the title Twin Sisters of Kyoto. Directed by Noboru Nakamura, it was nominated for the Academy Award for Best Foreign Language Film. A second film adaptation under the novel's original title Koto was made in 1980 by director Kon Ichikawa. Another film adaptation, again titled Koto, was directed by Yuki Saito and released in 2016.
