= Marshall Professor of French =

Established chair at the University of Glasgow

Marshall Chair of French Language and Literature University of Glasgow
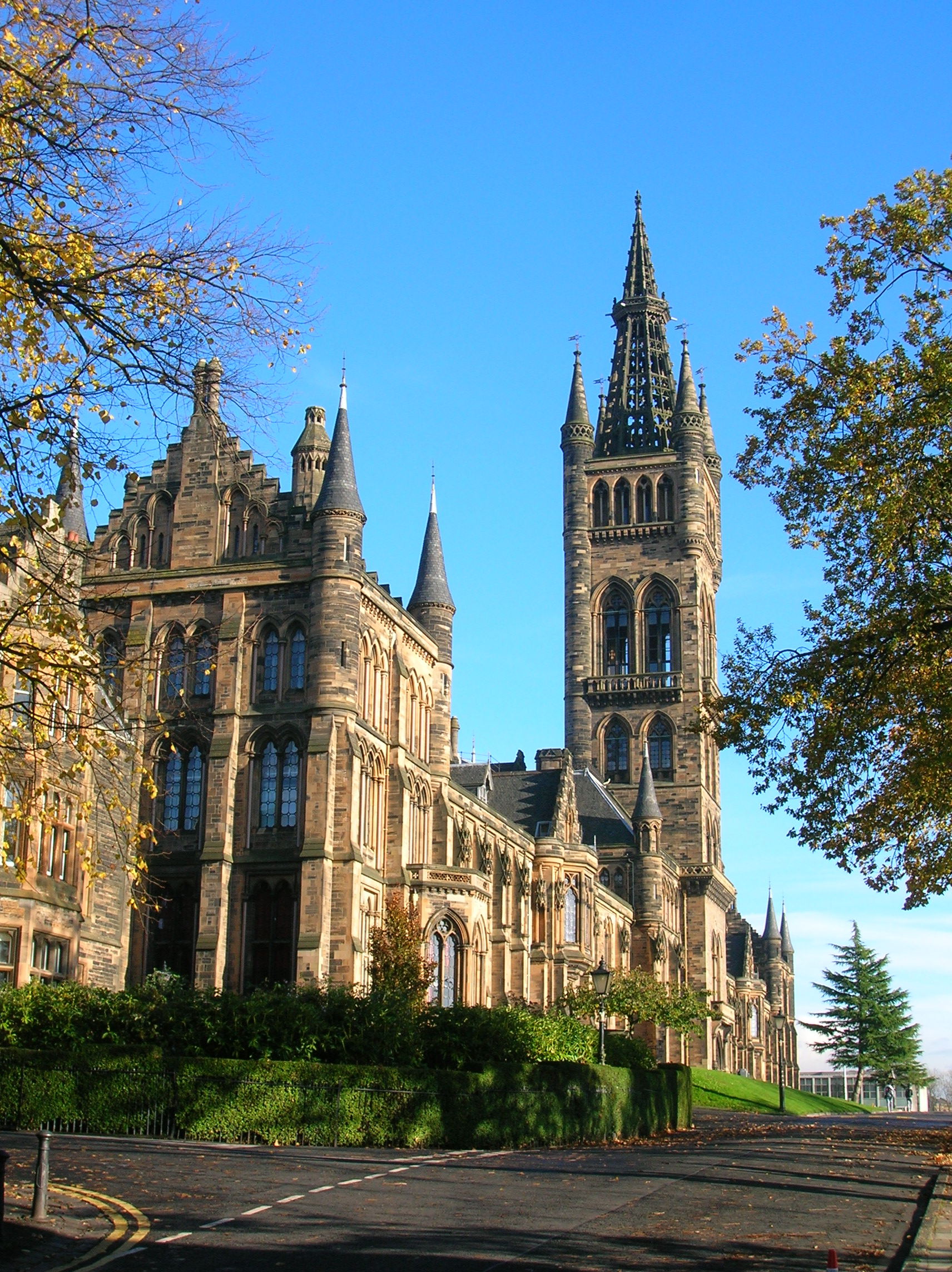
- Incumbent; Michael Syrotinski since 8 January 2013
- Precursor: Marshall Chair of Modern Romance Languages
- Formation: 1917
- First holder: Charles Martin
- Website: www.gla.ac.uk/french

The Marshall Chair of French Language and Literature is one of two established chairs in French at the University of Glasgow, the other being the Stevenson Chair which is not currently occupied. It was established in 1917 as the Marshall Chair of Modern Romance Language from a lectureship instituted in 1895, and had its title changed in 1966.

Robert Marshall, after whom the chair is named, owned the Grangehill Estate near Beith, Ayrshire, and left it to the university in his will to assist with the foundation of a chair in modern languages. He died in 1912. His legacy was combined with that of James Clason-Harvie of Brownlie and others to endow the existing lectureship, created as a chair in 1917.

== Marshall Professors of French ==
In 1919, the Marshall Lecturer in French, Charles Martin, became the first Marshall Professor. He was succeeded in 1937 by Alan Boase, a graduate of Oxford, Cambridge and the Sorbonne, and an authority on influential French Renaissance writer Michel de Montaigne. He was made an Officer of the Legion of Honour by the French government and in 1979 won the Prix du Rayonnement de la Langue Française, awarded by the Académie française. Under his leadership, the department grew into one of the largest and most dynamic in Britain. Boase retired in 1966 and died in 1982.

Boase was followed in 1966 by Austin Gill, a Fellow of Magdalen College, Oxford who had previously been the British Council's Representative in North Africa and Director of the British Institute in Paris, and had been awarded a CBE in 1955. Gill was a specialist in French literature of the 19th century and particularly the work of symbolist poet Stéphane Mallarmé. He retired from the chair in 1971 to focus on this research, being succeeded by Henry Barnwell, and died in 1990.

In 1980, Colin Smethurst was appointed to the chair from the University of Liverpool. He was made an Officier dans l'Ordre des Palmes académiques, the second of three grades of that Order. Smethurst retired in 1998 and Noël Peacock was appointed to the chair, holding it until his own retirement in 2010.

=== List of Professors ===
- 1919: Charles Martin MA DTheol
- 1937: Alan Boase MA PhD
- 1966: Austin Gill CBE MA Le-ès-L
- 1971: Henry Barnwell MA D-de-l'U
- 1980: Colin Smethurst MA BLitt Officier dans l'Ordre des Palmes académiques
- 1998: Noël Peacock BA MA Chevalier dans l'Ordre des Palmes académiques, Chevalier dans l'Ordre des Arts et des Lettres
- 2012: Michael Syrotinski

== See also ==
- List of Professorships at the University of Glasgow
