= Thousand Cranes =

1949–1951 novel by Yasunari Kawabata

- First edition
- Author: Yasunari Kawabata
- Original title: Senbazuru (千羽鶴)
- Translator: Edward G. Seidensticker
- Language: Japanese
- Publisher: Chikuma Shobō (book)
- Publication date: 1949–1951, 1952
- Publication place: Japan
- English publication date: 1958
- Media type: Print

Thousand Cranes (千羽鶴, Senbazuru) is a novel by Japanese author Yasunari Kawabata which first appeared in serialised form between 1949 and 1951 and was published as a book in 1952.

== Plot ==
The novel consists of five chapters, titled "Thousand Cranes", "The Grove in the Evening Sun", "Figured Shino", "Her Mother's Lipstick" and "Double Star".

28-year-old Tokyo office worker Kikuji attends the tea ceremony lesson of Miss Chikako Kurimoto, with whom his deceased father once had a short-lived affair. He still vividly remembers a large naevus on her chest, which he once saw as a child. Kikuji is impressed by the beauty of one of Miss Kurimoto's pupils, Yukiko Inamura, who carries a furoshiki which bears a pattern of the thousand cranes of the novel's title. The tea ceremony lesson is also attended by Mrs. Ota, a 45-year-old widow and long-time mistress of his father, and her daughter Fumiko. Miss Kurimoto speaks disparagingly of Mrs. Ota, while at the same trying to awaken Kikuji's interest in Miss Inamura.

Kikuji and Mrs. Ota spend a passionate night together, and Kikuji wonders if Mrs. Ota sees his father in him. When she visits him again after a long pause, he learns that her daughter Fumiko tried to keep her from meeting him. Despite her deep sense of shame, she sleeps with Kikuji again. Late that night, Fumiko rings him to tell him that her mother committed suicide. He agrees to help Fumiko with covering up her mother's suicide to maintain her reputation.

Miss Kurimoto repeatedly shows up in Kikuji's house, speaking badly of Mrs. Ota while at the same time reminding him of Miss Inamura. Kikuji, annoyed by her intrusiveness, replies that he is not interested in the young woman. Fumiko bequests him a shino ware jar of her mother, and later a shino tea bowl, which allegedly bears an unremovable trace of her mother's lipstick. Kikuji develops an interest in Fumiko, asking himself if he sees her mother in her.

When Kikuji returns from a trip to Lake Nojiri, Miss Kurimoto brings him the news that both Miss Inamura and Fumiko have married another man in his absence. He learns that her story was a lie when Fumiko rings him to inform him that she will start a job and move into a flat farther away from him. Fumiko visits him later that evening and insists that her mother's tea bowl is of little value and should be destroyed. Kikuji places his father's tea bowl next to Mrs. Ota's, and they both are aware that these were the bowls his father and her mother drank from while they had their affair. Fumiko eventually shatters her mother's bowl on a stone plate. Later, Kikuji and Fumiko spend the night together.

The next day, Kikuji tries to ring Fumiko at her work, but she hasn't shown up. He goes to see her at her new flat, where he is told that she announced to go on a holiday with a friend. Kikuji speculates whether Fumiko has committed suicide like her mother.

== Characters ==
- Kikuji, the protagonist
- Chikako Kurimoto, a former mistress of Kikuji's father
- Mrs. Ota, a former mistress of Kikuji's father
- Fumiko, Mrs. Ota's daughter
- Yukiko Inamura, a pupil of Miss Kurimoto

== Themes ==
In his 2015 review for The Japan Times, Stephen Mansfield pointed out the novel's "beautiful language, obsessive sexuality and contempt for the era", and the repeated juxtaposition of the "ugly and venal" with images of beauty, calling it "a work suffused with loneliness and disorientation at the failure of art, literature and even the tea ceremony to create a more ideal world". Boyd Tonkin in The Independent found "chaotic passions" at work behind "a lyrical and understated surface", with the rituals and vessels of the tea ceremony symbolically enacting "the guilt, grief and longing" of the protagonists.

In his analysis of Thousand Cranes, David Pollack drew parallels between Kawabata and French writer Marguerite Duras, finding "a similar sense of fated destinies, of dreamlike and inchoate realities, of lyrical resignation to some steadily encroaching fate in terms of which […] life seems to take on its most important meaning". Commenting on the character of Miss Kurimoto, he sees the tea ceremony in her hands having become "perverted and grotesque" and "a ritual of power and revenge". For Pollack, the thoroughly negative portrayal of Miss Kurimoto is a sign of Kawabata's, and most male Japanese writers', antagonism to the idea of "a woman with 'masculine' interests and the willingness and ability to act on them".

Kawabata himself rejected the idea to see his novel as "an evocation of the formal and spiritual beauty of the tea ceremony", explaining, it was "a negative work, and expression of doubt about and warning against the vulgarity into which the tea ceremony has fallen".

== Awards ==
Thousand Cranes is one of three novels cited by the Nobel Committee in awarding Yasunari Kawabata the Nobel Prize for Literature, the other two being Snow Country and The Old Capital. The novel was selected for translation and inclusion in the UNESCO Collection of Representative Works.

== Adaptations ==
Thousand Cranes was adapted into a feature film in 1953 by Kōzaburō Yoshimura and in 1969 by Yasuzo Masumura.

== Bibliography ==
- Kawabata, Yasunari (1958). Thousand Cranes. Translated by Seidensticker, Edward G. New York: Berkley Medallion.
