= Tanpopo (novel) =

Posthumous novel by Yasunari Kawabata

Tampopo
- Author: Yasunari Kawabata
- Original title: たんぽぽ
- Translator: Michael Emmerich
- Language: Japanese
- Publication date: 1964 (magazine); 1972 (novel)
- Publication place: Japan

Tanpopo ("The Dandelion") is a Japanese novel by Yasunari Kawabata, written in 1964, but published only posthumously in 1972, left unfinished when the author died. Kawabata had commenced serializing his final novel in the literary magazine Shincho, but after winning the Nobel Prize for Literature in October 1968 he ceased all publishing activity.

A French translation with the title Les pissenlits was published in 2012. An English translation with an afterword by Michael Emmerich was published in 2017 by New Directions.

== Plot ==
Kizaki Ineko has been placed in asylum. Her illness, somagnosia, is a fictional illness is the inability to perceive or see the bodies of others. The condition, naturally, affects her ability to relate to others as well: the fellow asylum inmate who writes, calligraphically, “To enter the Buddha world is easy; to enter the world of demons is difficult,” is to her simply a floating brush, while her boyfriend, Kuno, is a specter.

Then plot turns on the blindness of the girl Inako (稲子), when making love to the boy Hisano (久野) and the conversations leading to the decision of the girl's mother to protect him from the girl, lest she harm him when she is blind.
