= Big Mama's Funeral =

- Short story by Gabriel García Márquez
- Original title: Los funerales de la Mamá Grande
- Genre(s): Magical realism

Publication
- Published in: Los funerales de la Mamá Grande
- Publication date: 1962

"Big Mama's Funeral" (Spanish: Los funerales de la Mamá Grande) is a short story by Gabriel García Márquez. In the story, an unidentified narrator tells a mythical account of a historical event summarized on the first page. Through the exaggerated size of Big Mama herself and her extravagant birthday party, the story satirizes corruption in Latin America at all levels of power. The story is told in a "highly oral style of a public storyteller or carnival barker." The story is set in the mythical town of Macondo, the setting of García Márquez's famous novel One Hundred Years of Solitude (Spanish: Cien años de soledad). Big Mama's Funeral is one of only three of the author's short stories set in the town.

== Publication history ==
Big Mama's Funeral was first published in 1962 by Universidad Veracruzana Press in a collection of short stories also entitled Los funerales de la Mamá Grande.. It is the final story in the collection.
