= Abdo Wazen =

Lebanese poet and critic

Abdo Wazen (born 1957) is a Lebanese poet and critic. He is the author of more than a dozen books of poetry, fiction and criticism. The latter include critical works on Mahmoud Darwish, Amin Maalouf and novels of the Lebanese civil war.

He has served as the chief editor of the culture section of the Al-Hayat newspaper.

== Selected works ==
=== Poetry ===
- The Closed Wood (1982)
- The Eye and the Air (1985)
- Another Reason for the Night (1986)
- Garden of the Senses (1993)
- Doors of Sleep (1996)
- Lantern of Temptation (2000)
- Fire of Return (2003)
- A Broken Life (2007)
- The Days Are Not for Bidding Them Farewell (2014).
- Beyrouth 4 Augoust 2020 at 18 o'clock

=== Novels ===
- Open Heart (2009)
- The Young Man who Saw the Colour of the Air (2011)

=== Criticism ===
- Mahmoud Darwish: the Stranger Falls Upon Himself (2006)
- An Introduction to Novels of the Lebanese War (2010)
- Amin Maalouf, Breaking Boundaries (2012)
