= The Master of Go =

Novel by Yasunari Kawabata

- First English-language edition
- Author: Yasunari Kawabata
- Original title: Meijin (名人)
- Translator: Edward Seidensticker
- Language: Japanese
- Genre: Historical novel
- Publisher: Shincho magazine
- Publication date: 1951 (magazine); 1954 (novel)
- Publication place: Japan
- English publication date: 1972 (Knopf)
- Media type: Print (Magazine, Hardback & Paperback)
- ISBN: 978-0-394-47541-7 (English)
- OCLC: 832372867

The Master of Go (Japanese: 名人, Hepburn: Meijin) is a novel by the Nobel Prize winning Japanese author Yasunari Kawabata. First published in serial form in 1951, Kawabata considered it his finest work. Sharply distinct from the rest of his literary output, The Master of Go is the only one of Kawabata's novels that the author considered to be finished.

== Plot ==
The story itself is a semi-fictionalized account of a lengthy 1938 Go game between the respected master Honinbo Shūsai and the up-and-coming player Minoru Kitani (known as Otaké in the book). The match took almost six months to complete, and was the last of Shūsai's career. In the novel, the game, as actually played in real life, lasts 237 moves, and is documented in the book by means of diagrams. Otaké (as his historical counterpart Kitani) wins by 5 points with the Black stones. Kawabata had reported on the match for the Mainichi newspaper chain, and some sections of the book are reworked versions of his original newspaper columns.

The novel follows the progress of the game as it moves from location to location, placing particular emphasis on the time between each player's moves (often a matter of days). As Meijin, Shūsai is entitled to certain deference which he does not always receive. Thus the players regularly come into conflict with one another about the ritual and ceremonial aspect of the game. Finally, Shūsai dies from an illness, mirroring the death of the historical Shūsai just over a year after the end of his match.

== Themes ==
Throughout the novel, Kawabata incorporates several themes. The novel's central aspect, a struggle between an older player whose powers are fading and his younger challenger, is a common motif representing the cycle of life and conflict between generations. Kawabata suggests that part of the tension comes from the divide between old traditions and new pragmatism — for example, commenting on the rigid rules governing the contest, the author writes:

From the way of Go, the beauty of Japan and the Orient had fled. Everything had become science and regulation.

Kawabata is often more interested in the internal conflict of the players than the conflicts between them: the book vividly describes the exhausting internal struggles of Shūsai and Otaké under the pressure of the game and their lives outside it.

Finally, as a retelling of a climactic struggle, translator Edward Seidensticker considers the work a symbolic parallel to the defeat of Japan in World War II, an event which affected Kawabata deeply. Kawabata began work on the book during the war, but did not complete it until well after the end of it.

== Publication ==
The book was translated into English (ISBN 978-0-394-47541-7) in 1972 by Seidensticker. His translation was based on a later revision of the work by Kawabata, which shortened the novel somewhat compared to the original Japanese book version. The book has been translated into more than a dozen other languages.

== Legacy ==
The book remains one of the most popular and critically successful of Kawabata's novels. The novel has also served to increase the popularity of Go in the West, providing a description of the game which does not require already knowing the rules. The work has been used by Western Go players as a starting point to explore the place of Go in Japanese society, and the book is commonly recommended to younger players.

== See also ==
- International Go Federation
- List of professional Go tournaments
