= Memories of My Melancholy Whores =

Novella by Gabriel García Márquez

- First edition (Colombian)
- Author: Gabriel García Márquez
- Original title: Memoria de mis putas tristes
- Translator: Edith Grossman
- Language: Spanish
- Publisher: Editorial Norma (Colombia); Alfred A. Knopf (US)
- Publication date: 2004
- Publication place: Colombia
- English publication date: 2005
- Media type: Print (Hardback & Paperback)
- Pages: 128
- ISBN: 978-1-4000-4460-3
- OCLC: 58431922
- Dewey Decimal: 863/.64 22
- LC Class: PQ8180.17.A73 M4613 2005

Memories of My Melancholy Whores (Spanish: Memoria de mis putas tristes) is a novella by Gabriel García Márquez. The book was originally published in Spanish in 2004, with an English translation by Edith Grossman published in October 2005.

== Plot ==
An old journalist, who has just celebrated his 90th birthday, seeks sex with a 14-year-old prostitute, who is selling her virginity to help her family. Instead of sex, he discovers love for the first time in his life.

== Reception ==
The book received positive reviews. John Updike called the novel a "velvety pleasure to read, though somewhat disagreeable to contemplate", and wrote that García Márquez "has composed, with his usual sensual gravity and Olympian humor, a love letter to the dying light." Terrence Rafferty, writing for the New York Times, praised Grossman's translation and García Márquez' narrative.

Michiko Kakutani, also writing for The New York Times, gave a negative review to the novel, calling it a "halfhearted exercise in storytelling" and criticizing the narrative, protagonist, and ending as banal.

Memories of My Melancholy Whores was banned in Iran after selling 5,000 copies; it had been sold under the name Memories of my Melancholy Sweethearts, and thus avoided censorship.

== Adaptation ==
Julia Leigh's 2011 film Sleeping Beauty is loosely based on this novella and The House of the Sleeping Beauties by Nobel laureates Yasunari Kawabata

In 2012, a joint film production under the same name of the novel by Spain, Denmark and Mexico was released by Danish film director, Henning Carlsen, and starring Emilio Echevarría, Olivia Molina, Ángela Molina and Geraldine Chaplin. The film received the Special Young Jury Prize at the Malaga Spanish Film Festival.
