= The House of the Sleeping Beauties =

Novella by Yasunari Kawabata

House of the Sleeping Beauties
- Author: Yasunari Kawabata
- Original title: 眠れる美女; Nemureru Bijo
- Language: Japanese
- Genre: Novella
- Published: 1961
- Publication place: Japan
- Media type: Print (paperback)

House of the Sleeping Beauties is a 1961 novella by the Japanese author Yasunari Kawabata. It is a story about a lonely man, Old Eguchi, who continuously visits the House of the Sleeping Beauties in hope of something more.

== Plot ==
The titular house is an establishment where old men pay to sleep beside young girls that had been narcotized and happen to be naked, the sleeping beauties. The old men are expected to take sleeping pills and share the bed for a whole night with a girl without attempting anything of "bad taste" like "putting a finger inside their mouths". Eguchi is presented with a different girl each time he visits the house because of the short notice of his visits. He discovers that all of the girls are virgins, which somehow compels him to comply with the house rules. Each girl is different and the descriptions of his actions are mixed with the dreams that he has sleeping beside the girls.

== Film adaptations ==
The 2006 adaptation by Vadim Glowna, Das Haus der schlafenden Schönen (House of the Sleeping Beauties), was not received well. Its Rotten Tomatoes rating is at 28%. Village Voice called it one of the worst releases of the year.

The 2011 Australian film Sleeping Beauty, directed by Julia Leigh, uses the central premise of House of the Sleeping Beauties as part of its main plotline, but reverses the viewpoint. The film contains a scene in which a university lecturer is presenting on a game of Go, a reference to Kawabata's 1951 novel The Master of Go. The literary sources for the film Sleeping Beauty (2011) were acknowledged and discussed in the book Sleeping Beauty presented to the press at the Cannes Film Festival 2011 by Screen Australia and subsequently in many interviews. These sources included Kawabata, Gabriel García Márquez, Charles Perrault, and the Holy Bible.

== Influence ==
The plot of Gabriel García Márquez's novella Memories of My Melancholy Whores is ostensibly inspired by the House of the Sleeping Beauties.
