= Snow Country =

Novel by Yasunari Kawabata

- Author: Yasunari Kawabata
- Original title: Yukiguni (雪国)
- Translator: Edward Seidensticker
- Language: Japanese
- Genre: Novel
- Publication date: 1935–1937 (serialization); 1948
- Publication place: Japan
- English publication date: 1956
- Media type: Print (Paperback)
- OCLC: 3623808

Snow Country (雪国, Yukiguni; IPA: [jɯkiꜜɡɯɲi]) is a novel by the Japanese author Yasunari Kawabata. The novel is considered a classic work of Japanese literature and was among the three novels the Nobel Committee cited in 1968, when Kawabata was awarded the Nobel Prize in Literature.

== Plot ==
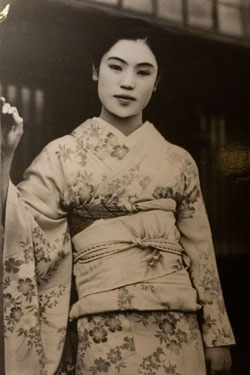
Onsen geisha Matsuei, on whom Kawabata is said to have based the character Komako in the novel.

Snow Country is a stark tale of a love affair between a Tokyo dilettante and a provincial geisha that takes place in the remote hot spring (onsen) town of Yuzawa. (Kawabata did not mention the name of the town in his novel.)

The novel opens with the protagonist of the novel, Shimamura, riding a train to a remote onsen town. Shimamura is a rich, married man, who inherited his wealth, and a self-professed ballet expert (although he has never seen one in person). During the train ride, he observes a young woman (who is later revealed as Yoko) caring for a sickly man (named Yukio). He observes the woman through a reflection in the train window, and is particularly enthralled by her eyes, as well as the sound of her voice.

Shimamura's purpose for going to the onsen is to meet a young woman, Komako, with whom he had a brief encounter during his previous stay. Although she wasn't employed as a geisha during his first stay, her situation is changed during his second visit. Shimamura is attracted to the young geisha, although his affection proves to be inconsistent and uncertain over time. However, Komako falls in love with Shimamura, which goes against the geisha tradition of meeting the customers' demands without any emotional attachment. Throughout their conversations, a number of things about Komako's life are revealed: her becoming a geisha to pay for Yukio's hospital bills, their rumored engagement, Komako and Yukio's strained relationship, how she came to live with Yukio and his mother, and her life as a full-time geisha.

The climax of the novel happens during one of Komako's visits to Shimamura's room at the onsen inn. During their conversation, Shimamura calls her a "good woman", instead of a "good girl". This change of wording used to describe Komako reveals that the two of them could never be together, while Komako's hopes of a better and happier life with Shimamura remain just a delusion.

At the very end of the novel, a fire occurs in the town warehouse, which was at the time being used as a cinema. Shimamura and Komako rush to the fire, and see Yoko falling lifelessly from the warehouse balcony. Komako carries Yoko's body away from the burning warehouse, while Shimamura slinks back, observing the night sky and “roaring milky way.”

== Major themes ==
=== The modern and traditional ===
Snow Country was written during a period of Japanese militarism, and a number of modern inventions can be seen in the novel, which include a train, a snowplow, and an electric avalanche warning system. Kawabata saw no conflict between the modern and the traditional, but saw modern inventions as part of the traditional Japan. This can be seen in the train scene, at the very beginning of the novel, during which the protagonist observes the beautiful eyes of the female passenger. The electric light of the train thus facilitates traditional aesthetic expression. Various modern inventions are treated as a normal part of life in the rustic onsen town.

=== Beauty ===
This novel, like others Kawabata wrote, vividly depicts the psychic cost of aesthetic appreciation, as well as its effect on minds susceptible to beauty. The protagonist of the novel is often taken out of the real world and into the dream world of his own mind after witnessing beauty. Furthermore, this beauty makes him oblivious to the world around him (e.g., after observing Yoko's eyes in the train or seeing the Milky Way during the fire at the end of the novel). This beauty often leads to Shimamura acting cold or cruel, as when he calls Komako a "good woman" after observing her in the moonlight.

The depictions of beauty in the novel also include an element of sadness: loneliness in the beauty of nature, sadness in Yoko's beautiful voice, wasted beauty of Komako, as well as the wasted effort in an act of love.

== Writing process ==
Gwenn Boardman Petersen uses Snow Country as an example of how Kawabata often composed his works. While writing that Japanese novelists often publish "their works in serial form and under various titles" she observes Kawabata is "further noted for his habit of rewriting, adding segments, and making changes in titles and content alike." The first segment, titled Yugeshiki no Kagami ("Mirror of the Evening Scene") appeared in Bungeishunjū January 1935. Kawabata later wrote that he could not finish his manuscript by the submission deadline of this literary journal, and decided to keep writing and submit a second version of this segment, titled Shiroi Asa no Kagami ("Mirror of a White Morning") to the general-interest magazine Kaizō several days later.

Kawabata continued to write about the characters, and five more segments were published over the next years: Monogatari ("Story" or "Tale") and Toro ("Futile Efforts") appeared in the journal Nihon Hyoron in the November and December 1935 issues; Kaya no Hana ("Miscanthus Flower") appeared in Chuo Koron August 1936; Hi no Makura ("Pillow of Fire") in Bungeishunjū October 1936; and Temariuta ("Handball Song") was published in Kaizō May 1937. He combined these segments into a "complete" Snow Country, making numerous changes to the texts as they appeared in the journals, which was published in June 1937.

Kawabata restarted work on the novel after a three-year break, again adding new chapters and again publishing in two separate journals, in 1940 and 1941. He re-wrote the last two sections, merging them into a single piece, published in a journal in 1946. Another additional piece arrived in 1947. Finally, in 1948, the novel reached its final form, an integration of nine separately published works.

Kawabata himself visited the Yuzawa onsen and worked on the novel there. The room in the hotel where he stayed is preserved as a museum.

Kawabata again returned to Snow Country near the end of his life. A few months before his death in 1972, he wrote an abbreviated version of the work, which he titled "Gleanings from Snow Country", that shortened the novel to a few spare pages, a length that placed it among his Palm-of-the-Hand Stories, a form to which Kawabata devoted particular attention for more than 50 years. An English translation of "Gleanings from Snow Country" was published in 1988 by J. Martin Holman, in the collection Palm-of-the-Hand Stories.

== Reception ==
Edward Seidensticker, noted scholar of Japanese literature whose English translation of the novel was published in 1956, described the work as "perhaps Kawabata's masterpiece." According to him, the novel reminds one of haiku, both for its many delicate contrapuntal touches and its use of brief scenes to tell a larger story.

Snow Country received favorable reviews both at the time of its publication, and over the following years. The Times stated: "He has fashioned an idyll out of unpromising material," while Eileen Fraser of the Times Literary Supplement said of "Mr. Kawabata's beautifully economical novel," "This is a finely written book, excellently translated." Jason Cowley has called Snow Country "...perhaps his finest work."

== Bibliography ==
- Kawabata, Yasunari (1952). Yukiguni (Japanese pocket ed.). Iwanami Shoten Publishing. ISBN 4-00-310813-2. Revised in 2003.

== Publication history ==
- 1956, Snow Country. New York: Knopf. OCLC: 3623808. Paperback. (translated by Edward G. Seidensticker).
- 1957, Snow Country. Tokyo: Charles E. Tuttle. OCLC: 29197673. Paperback.
- 1986, Snow Country and Thousand Cranes. UK: Penguin. ISBN 0140181180. Paperback.
- 1996, Snow Country. New York: Vintage. ISBN 0-679-76104-7. Paperback.
