= Yasunari Kawabata =

Japanese novelist (1899–1972)

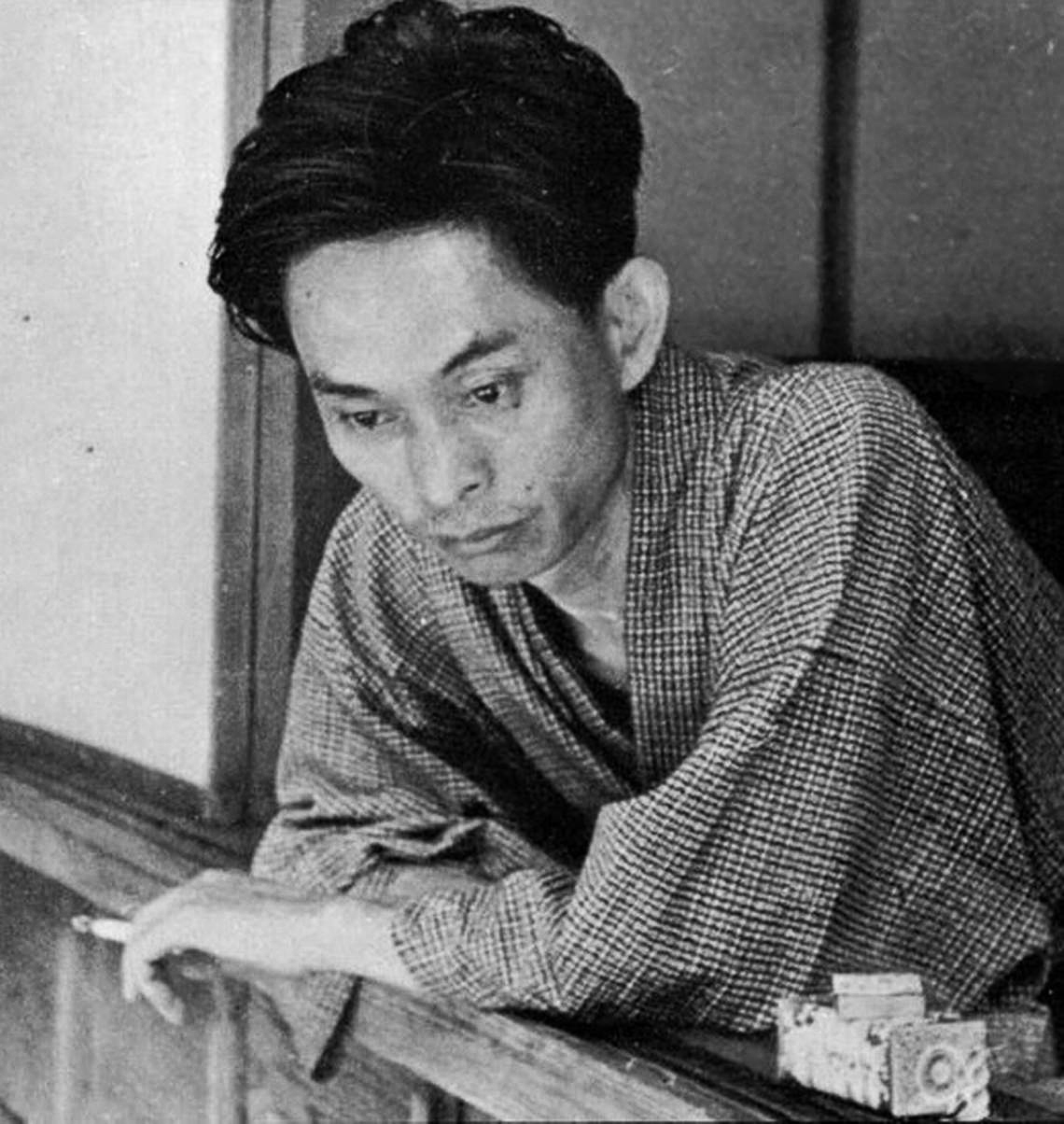
- Kawabata at his home in Kamakura
- Born: June, 1899; Kita-ku, Osaka, Japan
- Died: 16 April 1972 (aged 72); Zushi, Kanagawa, Japan
- Education: University of Tokyo
- Occupation: Writer
- Spouse: Hideko Kawabata
- Writing career
- Period: 1924–1972
- Genres: Novels, short stories
- Notable works: Snow Country, The Master of Go, The Dancing Girl of Izu, The Old Capital
- Notable awards: Nobel Prize in Literature; 1968
- Movement: Shinkankakuha

Japanese name
- Kanji: 川端 康成
- Hiragana: かわばた やすなり
- Katakana: カワバタ ヤスナリ
Transcriptions
- Romanization: Kawabata Yasunari

Yasunari Kawabata (川端 康成, Kawabata Yasunari; Japanese pronunciation: [kä̀.β̞ä́.bä́.tä́ | jä̀.sɨ́.nä̀.ɾʲì, -tä́ jä́-, -tä́], 11 June 1899 (Note: According to his family register, he was born on 14 June 1899.) – 16 April 1972), referred to in rare circumstances as Kōsei Kawabata, was a Japanese novelist and short story writer whose spare, lyrical, subtly-shaded prose works won him the 1968 Nobel Prize in Literature, the first Japanese author to receive the award. His works have enjoyed broad international appeal and are still widely read.

== Early life ==
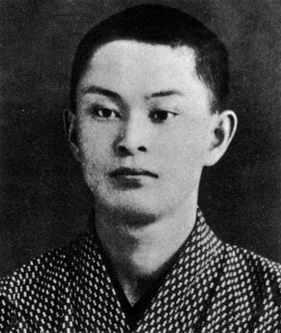
Kawabata in 1917

Born into a well-established family in Osaka, Japan, Kawabata was orphaned by the time he was four, after which he lived with his grandparents. He had an older sister who was taken in by an aunt, and whom he met only once thereafter, in July 1909, when he was ten. She died when Kawabata was 11. Kawabata's grandmother died in September 1906, when he was seven, and his grandfather in May 1914, when he was fifteen.

Having lost all close paternal relatives, Kawabata moved in with his mother's family, the Kurodas. However, in January 1916, he moved into a boarding house near the junior high school (comparable to a modern high school) to which he had formerly commuted by train. After graduating in March 1917, Kawabata moved to Tokyo just before his 18th birthday. He hoped to pass the entrance exams for the First Higher School, a university-preparatory institution that sent most of its graduates to the University of Tokyo, the country's most prestigious university. He was admitted in September 1917. Initially finding dormitory life unsatisfying, he took an eight-day trip to Izu in 1918, after which he got on much better with his dormmates. After graduating from the First Higher School, he secured admission to the Faculty of Letters at Tokyo University as he had hoped and matriculated in July 1920, studying English literature. The young Kawabata, by this time, was enamoured of the works of another Asian Nobel laureate, Rabindranath Tagore.

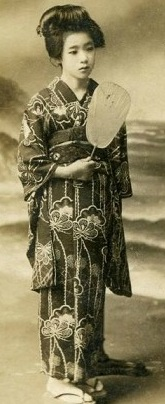
Hatsuyo Itō (1906–1951), to whom Kawabata was briefly engaged in 1921. She was the unrequited love of his life and may have influenced some of his works.

One of Kawabata's painful love episodes was with Hatsuyo Itō (伊藤初代; 1906–1951), whom he met when he was 20 years old. They were engaged to be married in 1921, but only one month later Hatsuyo broke off the engagement for unclear reasons. Kawabata never completely recovered from the blow of losing her. Hatsuyo may have been the inspiration for some of his works, including the novella The Dancing Girl of Izu and several Palm-of-the-Hand Stories. She died following complications from a stroke in 1951, aged 44, but Kawabata was not informed of her death until 1955. An unsent love letter to her was found at his former residence in Kamakura, Kanagawa Prefecture, in 2014.

While still a university student, Kawabata re-established the Tokyo University literary magazine Shin-shichō (New Tide of Thought), which had been defunct for more than four years. There he published his first short story, "Shokonsai ikkei" ("A View from Yasukuni Festival") in 1921. During university, he changed faculties to Japanese literature and wrote a graduation thesis titled "A short history of Japanese novels". He graduated from university in March 1924, by which time he had already caught the attention of Kikuchi Kan and other noted writers and editors through his submissions to Kikuchi's literary magazine, the Bungei Shunju.

=== Kawabata's Day of Birth ===
According to Kawabata's family register, June 14 was his birthday. His biographer Koyano writes that, although believing at hearing to be born on June 11 and the June 14 of the family register being false, after he received the Nobel Prize in Literature (see below), letters of his father to the parents of his father were found, and in one of then, Kawabata's birth was mentioned. The date would be June 14, so that, when the letters were discovered in May 1971, a second birthday party was held in June.

== New writing movement ==
In October 1924, Kawabata, Riichi Yokomitsu and other young writers started a new literary journal Bungei Jidai (The Artistic Age). This journal was a reaction to the entrenched old school of Japanese literature, specifically the Japanese movement descended from Naturalism, while it also stood in opposition to the "workers'" or proletarian literature movement of the Socialist/Communist schools. It was an "art for art's sake" movement, influenced by European Cubism, Expressionism, Dada, and other modernist styles. The term Shinkankakuha, which Kawabata and Yokomitsu used to describe their philosophy, has often been mistakenly translated into English as "Neo-Impressionism". However, Shinkankakuha was not meant to be an updated or restored version of Impressionism; it focused on offering "new impressions" or, more accurately, "new sensations" or "new perceptions" in the writing of literature. An early example from this period is the draft of Hoshi wo nusunda chichi (The Father who stole a Star), an adaption of Ferenc Molnár's play Liliom.

== Career ==
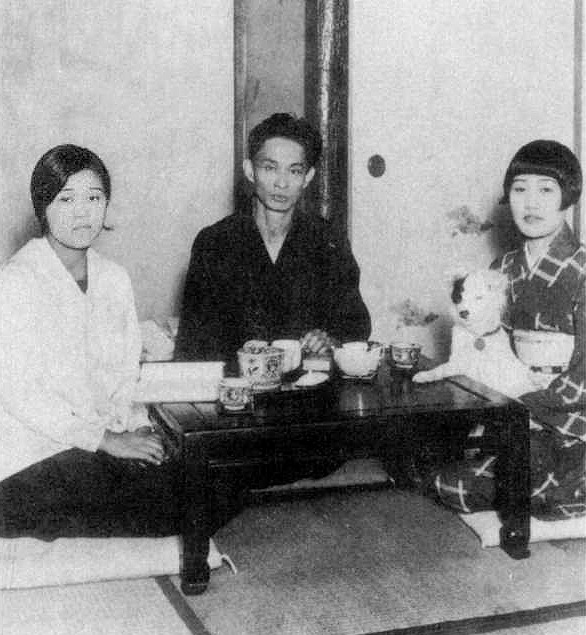
Kawabata with his future wife Hideko (秀子) to his left and her younger sister Kimiko (君子) to his right (1930).

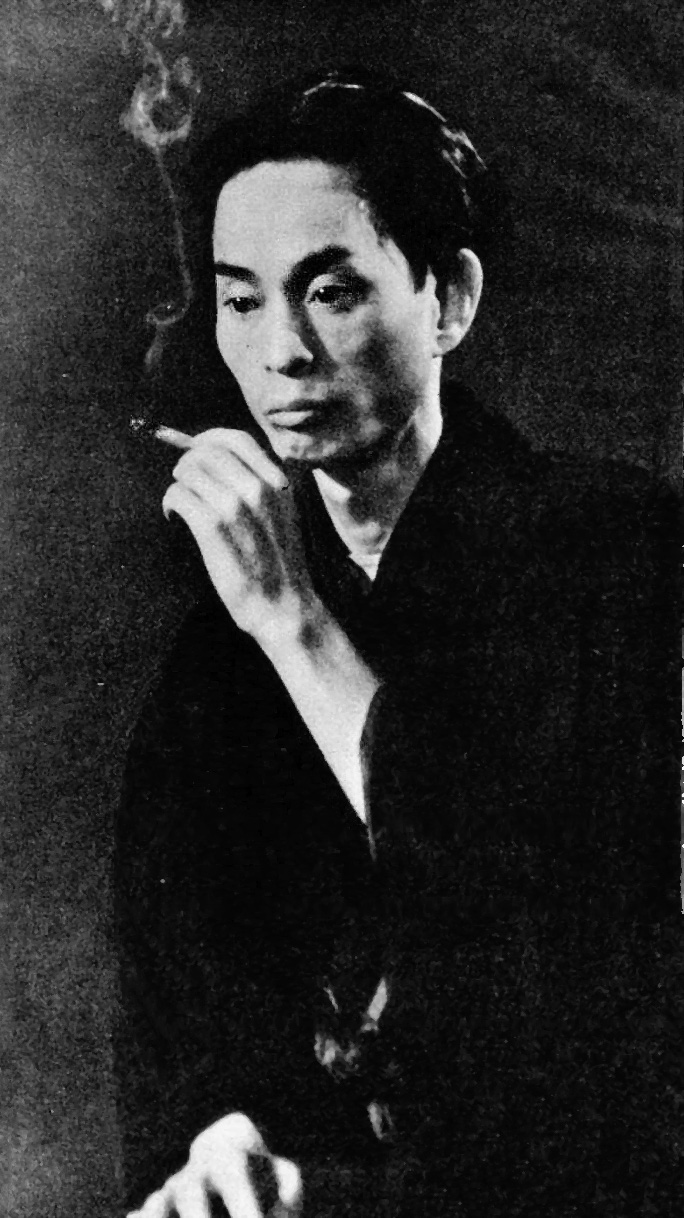
Kawabata c. 1932

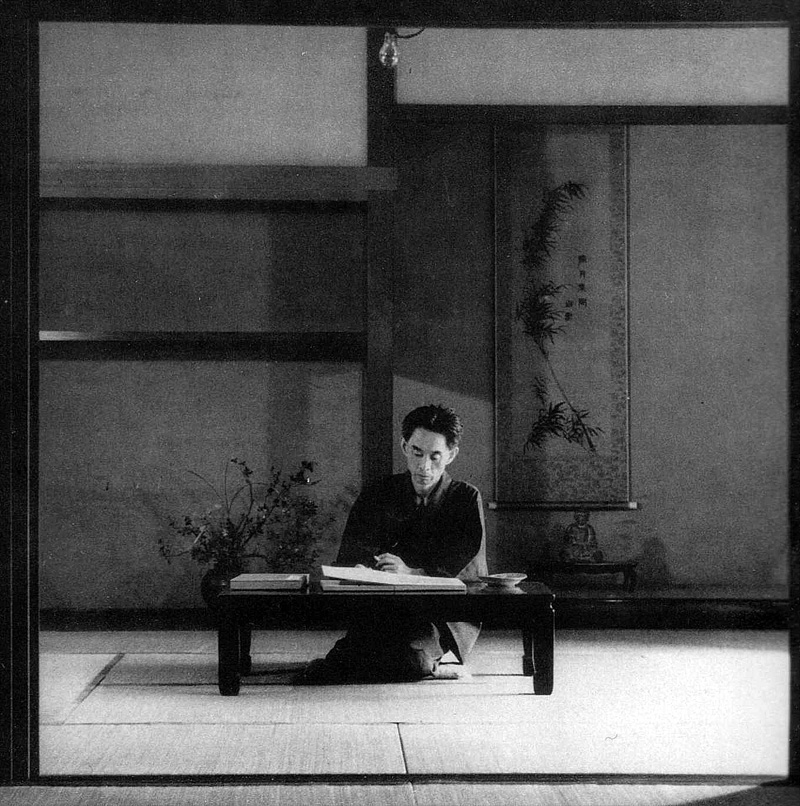
Kawabata at work at his house in Hase, Kamakura (1946)

Kawabata started to achieve recognition for a number of his short stories shortly after he graduated, receiving acclaim for "The Dancing Girl of Izu" in 1926, a story about a melancholy student who, on a walking trip down Izu Peninsula, meets a young dancer, and returns to Tokyo in much improved spirits. The work explores the dawning eroticism of young love but includes shades of melancholy and even bitterness, which offset what might have otherwise been an overly sweet story. Most of his subsequent works explored similar themes.

In the 1920s, Kawabata was living in the plebeian district of Asakusa, Tokyo. During this period, Kawabata experimented with different styles of writing. In Asakusa kurenaidan (The Scarlet Gang of Asakusa), serialized from 1929 to 1930, he explores the lives of the demimonde and others on the fringe of society, in a style echoing that of late Edo period literature. On the other hand, his Suishō gensō (水晶幻想; Crystal Fantasy) is pure stream-of-consciousness writing. He was even involved in writing the script for the experimental film A Page of Madness.

Kawabata met his wife Hideko (née Matsubayashi) in 1925, and they registered their marriage on 2 December 1931.

In 1933, Kawabata protested publicly against the arrest, torture and death of the young leftist writer Takiji Kobayashi in Tokyo by the Tokkō special political police.

Kawabata relocated from Asakusa to Kamakura, Kanagawa Prefecture, in 1934 and, although he initially enjoyed a very active social life among the many other writers and literary people residing in that city during the war years and immediately thereafter, in his later years he became very reclusive.

One of his most famous novels was Snow Country, started in 1934 and first published in installments from 1935 through 1937. Snow Country is a stark tale of a love affair between a Tokyo dilettante and a provincial geisha, which takes place in a remote hot-spring town somewhere in the mountainous regions of northern Japan. It established Kawabata as one of Japan's foremost authors and became an instant classic, described by Edward G. Seidensticker as "perhaps Kawabata's masterpiece".

After the end of World War II, Kawabata's success continued with novels such as Thousand Cranes (a story of ill-fated love), The Sound of the Mountain, The House of the Sleeping Beauties, Beauty and Sadness, and The Old Capital.

Thousand Cranes (serialized 1949–1951) is centered on the Japanese tea ceremony and hopeless love. The protagonist is attracted to the mistress of his dead father and, after her death, to her daughter, who flees from him. The tea ceremony provides a beautiful background for ugly human affairs, but Kawabata's intent is rather to explore feelings about death. The tea ceremony utensils are permanent and forever, whereas people are frail and fleeting. These themes of impossible love and impending death are again explored in The Sound of the Mountain (serialized 1949–1954), set in Kawabata's adopted home of Kamakura. The protagonist, an aging man, has become disappointed with his children and no longer feels strong passion for his wife. He is strongly attracted to someone forbidden – his daughter-in-law – and his thoughts for her are interspersed with memories of another forbidden love, for his dead sister-in-law.

The book that Kawabata himself considered his finest work, The Master of Go (1951), contrasts sharply with his other works. It is a semi-fictional recounting of a major Go match in 1938, on which he had actually reported for the Mainichi newspaper chain. It was the last game of master Shūsai's career and he lost to his younger challenger, Minoru Kitani, only to die a little over a year later. Although the novel is moving on the surface as a retelling of a climactic struggle, some readers consider it a symbolic parallel to the defeat of Japan in World War II.

Through many of Kawabata's works the sense of distance in his life is represented. He often gives the impression that his characters have built up a wall around them that moves them into isolation. In a 1934 published work Kawabata wrote: "I feel as though I have never held a woman's hand in a romantic sense [...] Am I a happy man deserving of pity?”. Indeed, this does not have to be taken literally, but it does show the type of emotional insecurity that Kawabata felt, especially experiencing two painful love affairs at a young age.

Kawabata left many of his stories apparently unfinished, sometimes to the annoyance of readers and reviewers, but this goes hand to hand with his aesthetics of art for art's sake, leaving outside any sentimentalism, or morality, that an ending would give to any book. This was done intentionally, as Kawabata felt that vignettes of incidents along the way were far more important than conclusions. He equated his form of writing with the traditional poetry of Japan, the haiku.

In addition to fictional writing, Kawabata also worked as a reporter, most notably for the Mainichi Shimbun. Although he refused to participate in the militaristic fervor that accompanied World War II, he also demonstrated little interest in postwar political reforms. Along with the death of all his family members while he was young, Kawabata suggested that the war was one of the greatest influences on his work, stating he would be able to write only elegies in postwar Japan. Still, many commentators detect little thematic change between Kawabata's prewar and postwar writings.

== Awards ==
As the president of Japanese P.E.N. for many years after the war (1948–1965), Kawabata was a driving force behind the translation of Japanese literature into English and other Western languages. He was awarded the Goethe Plaque of the City of Frankfurt in 1959, appointed an Officer of the Order of Arts and Letters of France in 1960, and awarded Japan's Order of Culture the following year. In 1969, Kawabata was awarded an honorary doctorate by the University of Hawaiʻi.

== Nobel Prize ==
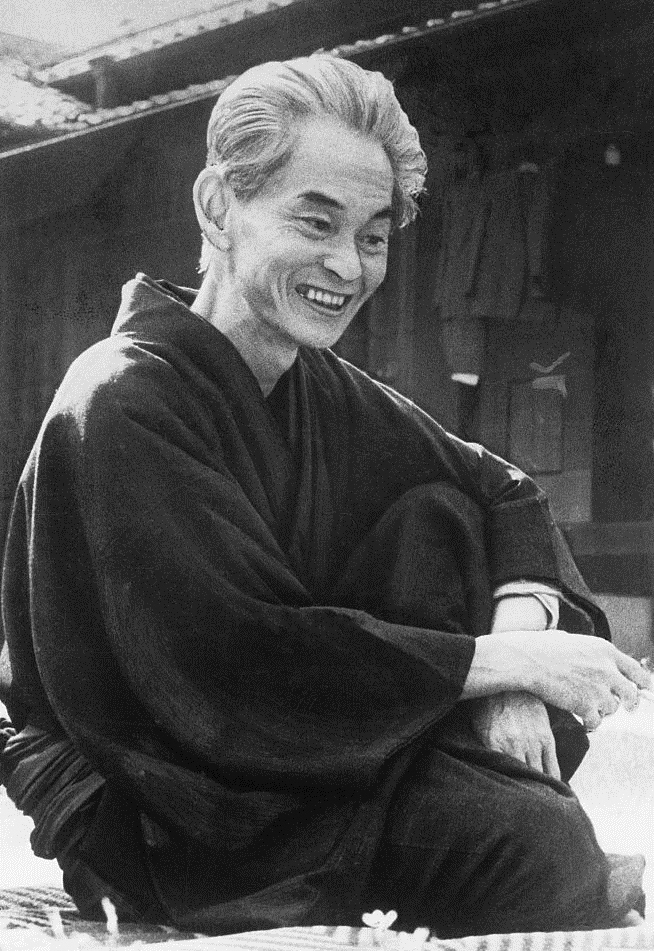
Kawabata in 1968

Kawabata was awarded the Nobel Prize for Literature on 16 October 1968, the first Japanese person to receive such a distinction. In awarding the prize "for his narrative mastery, which with great sensibility expresses the essence of the Japanese mind", the Nobel Committee cited three of his novels, Snow Country, Thousand Cranes, and The Old Capital.

Kawabata's Nobel Lecture was titled "Japan, The Beautiful and Myself" (美しい日本の私―その序説). Zen Buddhism was a key focal point of the speech; much was devoted to practitioners and the general practices of Zen Buddhism and how it differed from other types of Buddhism. He presented a severe picture of Zen Buddhism, where disciples can enter salvation only through their efforts, where they are isolated for several hours at a time, and how from this isolation there can come beauty. He noted that Zen practices focus on simplicity and it is this simplicity that proves to be the beauty. "The heart of the ink painting is in space, abbreviation, what is left undrawn." From painting he moved on to talk about ikebana and bonsai as art forms that emphasize the elegance and beauty that arises from the simplicity. "The Japanese garden, too, of course symbolizes the vastness of nature."

In addition to the numerous mentions of Zen and nature, one topic that was briefly mentioned in Kawabata's lecture was that of suicide. Kawabata reminisced of other famous Japanese authors who committed suicide, in particular Ryūnosuke Akutagawa. He contradicted the custom of suicide as being a form of enlightenment, mentioning the priest Ikkyū, who also thought of suicide twice. He quoted Ikkyū, "Among those who give thoughts to things, is there one who does not think of suicide?" There was much speculation about this quote being a clue to Kawabata's suicide in 1972, a year and a half after Mishima had committed suicide.

== Death ==
Kawabata died by gas asphyxiation in 1972, in an apparent suicide, although several close associates and friends, including his widow, consider his death to have been accidental. One thesis, as advanced by Donald Richie, was that he mistakenly unplugged the gas tap while preparing a bath. Many theories have been advanced as to his potential reasons for killing himself, among them poor health (the discovery he had Parkinson's disease), a possible illicit love affair, or the shock caused by the suicide of his friend Yukio Mishima in 1970. Unlike Mishima, Kawabata left no note, and since (again unlike Mishima) he had not discussed significantly in his writings the topic of taking his own life, his motives remain unclear. However, his Japanese biographer, Takeo Okuno, has related how he had nightmares about Mishima for two or three hundred nights in a row, and was incessantly haunted by the specter of Mishima. In a persistently depressed state of mind, he would tell friends during his last years that sometimes, when on a journey, he hoped his plane would crash.

== Selected works ==
Kawabata's works have been translated into languages such as German, English, French, Turkish, and Korean.

Year	Japanese Title	English Title	English Translation
1926	伊豆の踊子; Izu no odoriko	The Dancing Girl of Izu	1955, 1997
1930	浅草紅團; Asakusa kurenaidan	The Scarlet Gang of Asakusa	2005
1935–1937, 1947	雪国; Yukiguni	Snow Country	1956
1948-1949	少年; Shōnen		
1949–1952	千羽鶴; Senbazuru	Thousand Cranes	1958
1949–1954	山の音; Yama no oto	The Sound of the Mountain	1970
1950–1951	虹いくたび Niji ikutabi	The Rainbow	2023
1951–1954	名人; Meijin	The Master of Go	1972
1954	みづうみ（みずうみ） Mizuumi	The Lake	1974
1961	眠れる美女; Nemureru bijo	The House of the Sleeping Beauties	1969
1962	古都; Koto	The Old Capital	1987, 2006
1964	美しさと哀しみと; Utsukushisa to kanashimi to	Beauty and Sadness	1975
1964	片腕; Kataude	One Arm	1969
1964–1968, 1972	たんぽぽ; Tanpopo	Dandelions	2017
1923–1972	掌の小説; Tanagokoro no shōsetsu (Note: The original title is romanised either as Tenohira no shōsetsu or Tanagokoro no shōsetsu. Kawabata preferred the reading tanagokoro for the 掌 character.)	Palm-of-the-Hand Stories	1988 (Note: An exemplary collection of 70 translated stories of the over 140 Palm of the Hand Stories was published in 1988. Single story translations had appeared before and after.)

== See also ==
- List of Japanese Nobel laureates and nominees
- List of Nobel laureates by university affiliation
- The Moon in the Water: Understanding Tanizaki, Kawabata, and Mishima
