= J. Martin Holman =

American puppeteer and translator (born 1957)

James Martin Holman Jr. (born September 10, 1957, in Louisville, Kentucky) is a literary translator, professor, puppeteer, and puppet theater director. He did his graduate work in Japanese literature at the University of California, Berkeley.

Holman lived in Japan for more than 25 years as a missionary, graduate student, professor of Japanese literature, and resident director of two study centers: the Japan Center for Michigan Universities (JCMU) in Hikone and the Associated Kyoto Program Center (AKP) at Doshisha University in Kyoto. He was the first non-Japanese to train and perform in Japan as a traditional puppeteer in the style of puppetry commonly known as Bunraku or ningyō jōruri, making his stage debut in 1994 with the 170-year-old Tonda Traditional Bunraku Puppet Troupe in Shiga Prefecture. He is the founding director of the Bunraku Bay Puppet Troupe, based in Columbia, Missouri, which performs traditional Japanese puppet theater in the United States.

In 2017, the film "Kaiju Bunraku" debuted at the Sundance Film Festival, featuring the puppetry of Holman's Bunraku Bay Puppet Theater.

Holman has also published many translations of modern Japanese and Korean literature, including The Old Capital (1987), Palm-of-the-Hand Stories (1988), and The Dancing Girl of Izu (1998), by Nobel Prize-winning Japanese author Yasunari Kawabata; The Book of Masks (1989) and Shadows of Sound (1990), by Korean writer Hwang Sun-wŏn; and The House of Twilight by Korean author Yun Heung-gil. Holman has taught Japanese language, literature, and theater and Korean literature at colleges and universities in Japan, the United States, and Canada.

From 2005 until 2017, Holman taught Japanese language, Japanese and Korean Literature, and Japanese theater, as Teaching Professor and Coordinator of the Japanese Studies Program at the University of Missouri. In 2019 he moved to the city of Tokushima in Japan, where currently lives and where he founded the troupe, Tokubeiza, which performs traditional Japanese puppet theater.

== Works translated ==
- Hwang Sun-won. Shadows of Sound. Mercury House, 1989. ISBN 0-916515-65-6
- Hwang Sun-won. Book of Masks.
- Kawabata Yasunari. The Old Capital. North Point, 1987. ISBN 0-86547-278-5. Revised edition—Counterpoint, 2006. ISBN 978-1-59376-032-8.
- Kawabata Yasunari. Palm-of-the-Hand Stories. North Point, 1988. ISBN 0-86547-325-0 Repr. by Farrar, Straus and Giroux, ISBN 0-374-53049-1
- Kawabata Yasunari. The Dancing Girl of Izu and Other Stories. Counterpoint, 1997. ISBN 1-887178-14-7
- Yun Heung-gil. The House of Twilight.
