= Seisen University =

Seisen University refers to either:

- Seisen University (Shiga), a university in Shiga Prefecture
- Seisen University (Tokyo), a women's college in Tokyo.
