= Hachioji Kuruma Ningyo =

Japanese puppet theater company

Hachioji Kuruma Ningyo is a Japanese puppet theater company that has been in the family of the founder of the kuruma ningyo style of puppetry since the 19th century. The company was named an Intangible Cultural Asset by the city of Tokyo and an Important Intangible Folk Cultural Property by the Japanese government. Since the mid-1990s, the company has been directed by Koryu Nishikawa V, who has brought the art form to international attention, touring mostly Europe and the Americas.

== Kuruma Ningyo puppetry ==
Kuruma Ningyo puppetry is a style of puppet manipulation. As it is derived from the older bunraku, it is part of Japanese theatrical heritage, which has its origin in religious artistic expression. For this reason, it is not a form of children's entertainment like in the West, but rather a form of entertainment for the masses, performing stories from classical Japanese literature and famous events of the Edo period (19th century) Japan.

Performances begin with the sanbaso, a puppet dance which seeks to clear the stage of bad energy and acts as a petition for the show's success. Like bunraku, the performance of the puppets on stage is accompanied by shinnai musicians (generally one singer and one shamisen player), one main chanting narrator (tayuu) and an assistant. The music of the three-stringed shamisen is to highlight background themes, emotions and other non-verbal elements.

What distinguishes kuruma ningyo from its predecessor is how the puppets are manipulated on stage. Kuruma is from rokuro-kuruma (a small seat with wheels) and ningyo means "puppet", thus "puppet on a cart". Large puppets over a meter tall are placed in front of a single puppeteer, dressed in black, who is seated on the wheeled vehicle. The use of this seat means that there is one puppeteer per puppet, unlike the three needed for bunraku, . and also allows movement of the puppets over the entire stage, rather a limited horizontal plane.

The attachment of the puppet to the front of the black-clad person, also allows the puppeteer to match elements such as hands, feet and head for more realistic movement, such as walking feet, allowing an easier illusion of the puppet moving on its own. The right hand of the puppet is controlled by the right hand of the puppeteer, and the feet are attached correspondingly by the puppeteer's toes grasping pegs under the feet of the puppet. The heads are attached by a thin black cord that allows corresponding head movement. While the left hand is used to manipulate the left hand of the puppet, it is also used to manipulate the eyelids and/or mouth of the puppet. When this is required, the puppeteer must manipulate both arms with the right hand, making this style of puppetry more difficult.

Much of its traditional repertoire is similar to that performed in the 19th century, using traditional music, stories and scenery. The company regularly performs with Shinnai Joruri Narrative Song master Tsuruga Wakasanojo XI, who has been designated a Living National Treasure (Bearer of Intangible Cultural Property). This title is held by only about 100 people in all artistic and craft endeavors in Japan.

However, under its current director it has experimented with non-traditional elements and story lines. The troupe has performed with a female gidayu (chanter/narrator), something that is rare. It also has higher quality set design and more sophisticated lighting than most puppet theater productions.

== History of the Hachioji company ==
Kuruma ningyo refers to the puppetry technique, developed starting in 1872 by the Nishikawa family. Hachioji is the name of the company, and is taken from the name of the suburb in western Tokyo, where the troupe's headquarters is located.

Since its inception, the art has been passed down through five generations, with all of the directors named after the original founder Koryu Nishikawa I. Starting in the mid-1990s, the company began to have international performances, touring extensively in Europe, Asia and the America. They have performed in countries such as Chile, Uruguay, Brazil, Hungary, the Czech Republic, Sweden, Russia, Canada, the United States and Saipan, along with most of Japan. For the shows in Brazil, Chile and Uruguay, the company received the Florencia Sánchez Prize for the best foreign performance at the International Theater Festival in Uruguay. In 2014, the company was invited to represent Japan at the 42nd Festival Internacional Cervantino in Mexico.

The Hachioji Kuruma Ningyo was designated at an Intangible Cultural Asset by the city of Tokyo in 1962 and later an Intangible Folk Custom Cultural Asset by the national government.

== Koryu Nishikawa V ==
The current director (iemoto) of the Hachioji Kuruma Ningyo is Koryu Nishikawa, the fifth generation with this name and this occupation, taking on the role in 1996. He began studying kuruma ningyo puppetry when he was thirteen years old, apprenticing under his grandfather and father. Later he studied bunraku at the School of the National Bunraku Theater.

Nishikawa V has internationalized the company and its productions to a degree because of his international experience. He learned from working with Michael Meschke's theater company in Stockholm and his work shows influence from this time teaching at the Marionette Theater Institute in Sweden in 1987. This includes productions aimed at international audiences and foreign elements such as flamenco dancers.

Nishikawa carries on the tradition not only to the next generations of his family, but also to young people in Japan, establishing the Passing Traditional Puppetry to Next Generation puppet festival to promote traditional Japanese puppetry.

In 2004, his hometown named him their cultural ambassador.
