= Tonda Traditional Bunraku Puppet Troupe =

Tonda Puppet Troupe (冨田人形共遊団, Tonda Ningyō Kyōyūdan), founded in the 1830s, is one of the most active groups performing traditional ningyō jōruri or Bunraku puppetry in Japan, and has been officially designated an Intangible Cultural Treasure.

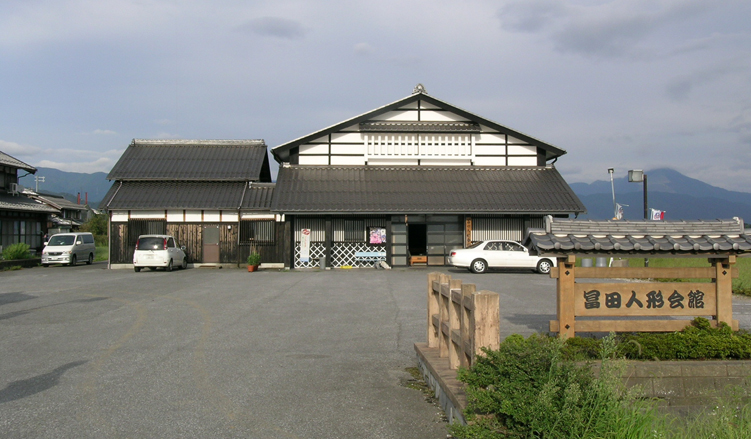
Tonda Puppet Hall, located in the city of Nagahama.

In 2016, the then-Crown Prince Naruhito visited Nagahama and the Tonda Puppet Troupe performed for him and his wife.

They are in possession of some of the oldest bunraku puppet heads after the National Bunraku Theater burned down. Their oldest heads are 250 years old and have a stamp branded into the handle.

Based in the northern part of the city of Nagahama near the shore of Lake Biwa, in Shiga Prefecture, northeast of Kyoto, the Tonda Puppets have made international performance tours to Australia, New Zealand, Russia, Germany, and thirteen times to the United States. The Tonda Troupe performs regularly at their own theater in Nagahama and on tour within Japan. The Tonda Puppet Troupe also instructs elementary school students in bunraku puppetry and hosts training sessions for local citizens interested in pursuing the art of the traditional puppet theater. The Tonda Troupe has also been active in training American college and university students in traditional Japanese puppetry in academic programs sponsored by such institutions as Berea College in Kentucky and the University of Massachusetts Amherst, as well as the Japan Center for Michigan Universities, which is located in the nearby city of Hikone. In 2012 they also hosted a group of A-Level Theatre Studies students from Abingdon School and The School of St Helen and St Katharine, two independent schools in Abingdon, Oxfordshire.

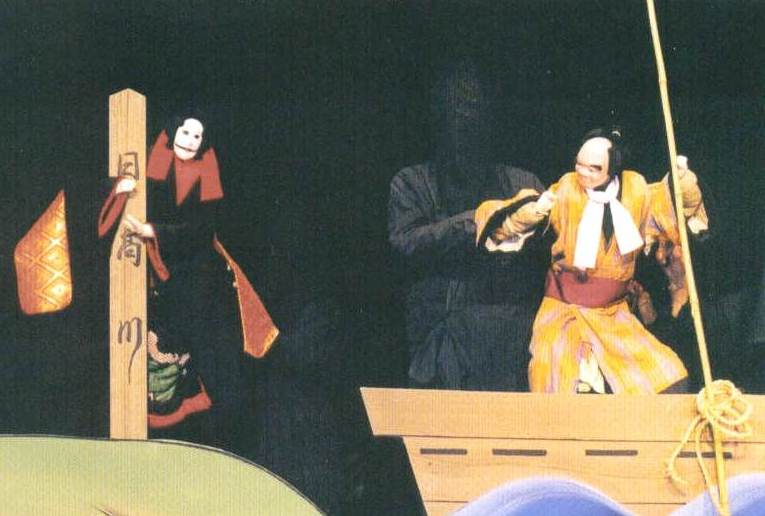
The "Scene at the Ferry Crossing," in which the young woman Kiyohime, mocked by a boatman on the Hidaka River, is transformed into demon by her own jealous rage. From a performance of Hidakagawa Iriaizakura by the Tonda Puppet Troupe.

== History ==
The Tonda Troupe traces it origins to the 1830s, when an itinerant puppet troupe that had been traveling through the area was snowbound in the village of Tonda, where they had intended to offer a performance. Unable to continue their journey home to Tokushima or to draw a paying audience because of the snow, the members of the itinerant troupe fell further and further into debt to the villagers for food and shelter. When the weather broke, the unfortunate troupe left their puppets behind as collateral for a loan for the boat fare necessary to travel to the southwestern end of Lake Biwa and beyond. When years passed and the Tokushima puppeteers never returned to pay the debt and reclaim the puppets, the villagers finally formed their own puppet troupe, and by the latter half of the nineteenth century, the Tonda Puppet Troupe had itself become a semi-professional troupe that gave performances locally and on the road. Today, the Tonda Puppet Troupe still uses in performance many of the same puppet heads abandoned by the original snowbound troupe. Some of these puppet heads are over 200 years old, though the bodies and costumes, which wear more quickly, have been remade over the years.

For generations, membership in the Tonda Troupe was restricted to men from the four families who had been traditionally associated with the theater, but in the 1970s the troupe began to welcome both men and women from outside those families, and in 1993, the Tonda Puppets became the first traditional puppet troupe in Japan to admit a non-Japanese member. A theater building, the Tonda Puppet Hall (pictured above right), containing a full stage, as well as rehearsal and meeting spaces, was built for the Troupe in 1991 by the government of Shiga Prefecture. The Tonda Troupe is currently headed by Hidehiko Abe, who traces his ancestry back seven generations to one of the founding members of the troupe.
