= Bunraku Bay Puppet Troupe =

American puppet troupe

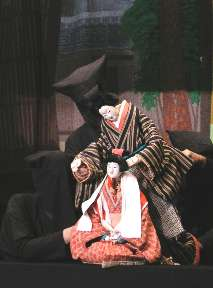
A performance by Bunraku Bay Puppet Troupe of Keisei Awa no Naruto at the 2006 Iida Puppetry Festival in Iida, Nagano Prefecture, Japan.

Bunraku Bay Puppet Troupe (known since 2011 as "Bunraku Bay Puppet Theater") is an American puppet troupe that performs the traditional Japanese puppet drama commonly known as ningyō jōruri or Bunraku. Based in Columbia, Missouri, the Troupe is directed by J. Martin Holman, retired professor of Japanese language, literature, and theater at the University of Missouri, and the first non-Japanese to train and perform in the traditional puppet theater in Japan. The original puppeteers of Bunraku Bay Puppet Theater were trained in Japan by members of three traditional puppet troupes: the Tonda Puppet Troupe, founded in the 1830s in Shiga Prefecture, Japan; and the 300-year-old Kuroda Puppet Troupe and the Imada Puppet Troupe of Iida, Nagano Prefecture, Japan. In recent years most members of Bunraku Bay have spent summers training with the Imada Puppet Troupe.

The "bay" of the Troupe's name derives from its origins in the Bay State of Massachusetts, where it was founded in 2004, and the "bei" (pronounced "bay") of the Japanese word "Beikoku" (米国), which means America.

The repertoire of Bunraku Bay consists largely of traditional pieces from Edo-period Japan and includes the Kotobuki Shiki Sanbasō 寿式三番叟 (pictured right), a lively, celebratory dance piece that opens a program of puppet theater; Yaoya Oshichi 八百屋お七 or Date Musume Koi no Higanoko 伊達娘恋火子, the story of a young woman who must climb a fire tower and sacrifice herself on a snowy night to save her lover; Hidakagawa Iriaizakura 日高川入相花王, a scene both comic and exciting in which a young woman's raging jealously transforms her into a demon serpent; the Lion Dance or shishimai 獅子舞, a puppet version of the dance performed frequently at festivals throughout Japan; The Dance of Ebisu or Ebisumai 恵比寿舞, a comic piece featuring the traditional fisherman deity; and Keisei Awa no Naruto 傾城阿波鳴門 (pictured left), the most widely performed puppet scene in Japan, in which a woman meets the daughter she had been forced to abandon as an infant ten years earlier.

Bunraku Bay Puppet Troupe has performed at a range of venues, in more than 30 states across the United States, as well as in Japan and Canada. Notable performances include the Kennedy Center for the Performing Arts and the Smithsonian Institution in Washington DC, the University of Chicago, the Orlando Puppetry Festival, the Japan Society in New York City, the Toronto Summer Music Festival, and the Iida Puppetry Festival in the city of Iida, Nagano Prefecture, Japan. The Troupe also performed for a segment on the NBC television comedy series, "Animal Practice", in which one of the characters visits the traditional puppet theater in Japan in a flashback scene. The Troupe also offers workshops on traditional Japanese puppetry and demonstrations of puppetry techniques.

In October 2009, Bunraku Bay Puppet Troupe completed a US tour jointly with members of the Imada Puppet Theater, with performances at Willamette University in Oregon, the University of Colorado in Boulder, the University of Missouri in Columbia, and at Princeton University in New Jersey. Bunraku Bay again performed with the Imada Puppet Theater at the Toronto Summer Music Festival in Canada in July 2010.

In April 2015, Bunraku Bay Puppet Theater was invited by the Consul General of Japan in Houston to present the auspicious "Kotobuki Shiki Sanbaso" at the opening ceremony of the Houston Japan Festival and offer performances during the two-day event, the theme of which was "Education through Authenticity."

In January 2017 the work of Bunraku Bay Puppet Theater was featured in "Kaiju Bunraku," a film that was selected and screened at the 2017 Sundance Film Festival. The 14-minute short, from the Borscht Corporation of Miami, Florida, depicts a couple, portrayed by puppets, who lives in a village in pre-modern Japan that is beset by 20th-century movie monsters. The film was directed by Jillian Mayer and Lucas Leyva.
