= Nanba (surname) =

Nanba (written: 難波, 南波,南場 or 南羽), sometimes romanized as Namba, is a Japanese surname. Notable people with the surname include:

- Akira Namba (難波 暉, born 1996), Japanese swimmer
- An Nanba (南波 杏, born 1984), Japanese pornographic actress
- Daisuke Nanba (難波 大助, 1899–1924), Japanese student attempted murder
- Hideki Nanba (難波 英樹, born 1974), Japanese rugby player
- Hiroaki Namba (難波 宏明, born 1982), Japanese football player
- Hiroyuki Namba (難波 弘之, born 1953), Japanese musician
- Hitoshi Nanba (難波 日登志, born 1960), Japanese director
- Ken Namba (難波 研, born 1983), Japanese composer
- Keiichi Nanba (難波 圭一, born 1957), Japanese voice actor
- Miyu Namba (難波 実夢, born 2002), Japanese swimmer
- Shigeru Nanba (難波 滋, born 1944), Japanese artist
- Shohei Nanba (南羽 翔平, born 1991), Japanese actor
- Shokichi Nanba (南波 正吉, 1911–1995), Japanese rower
- Simamkele Namba (born 1998), South African rugby player
- Taeko Namba (難波 多慧子), Japanese table tennis player
- Tomoko Namba (南場 智子, born 1962), Japanese entrepreneur
- Yasuko Namba (難波 康子, 1949-1996), Japanese mountaineer

== See also ==
- Namba Roy (1910–1961), Jamaican novelist and artist
