= Kawase Station =

Railway station in Hikone, Shiga Prefecture, Japan

Kawase Station 河瀬駅
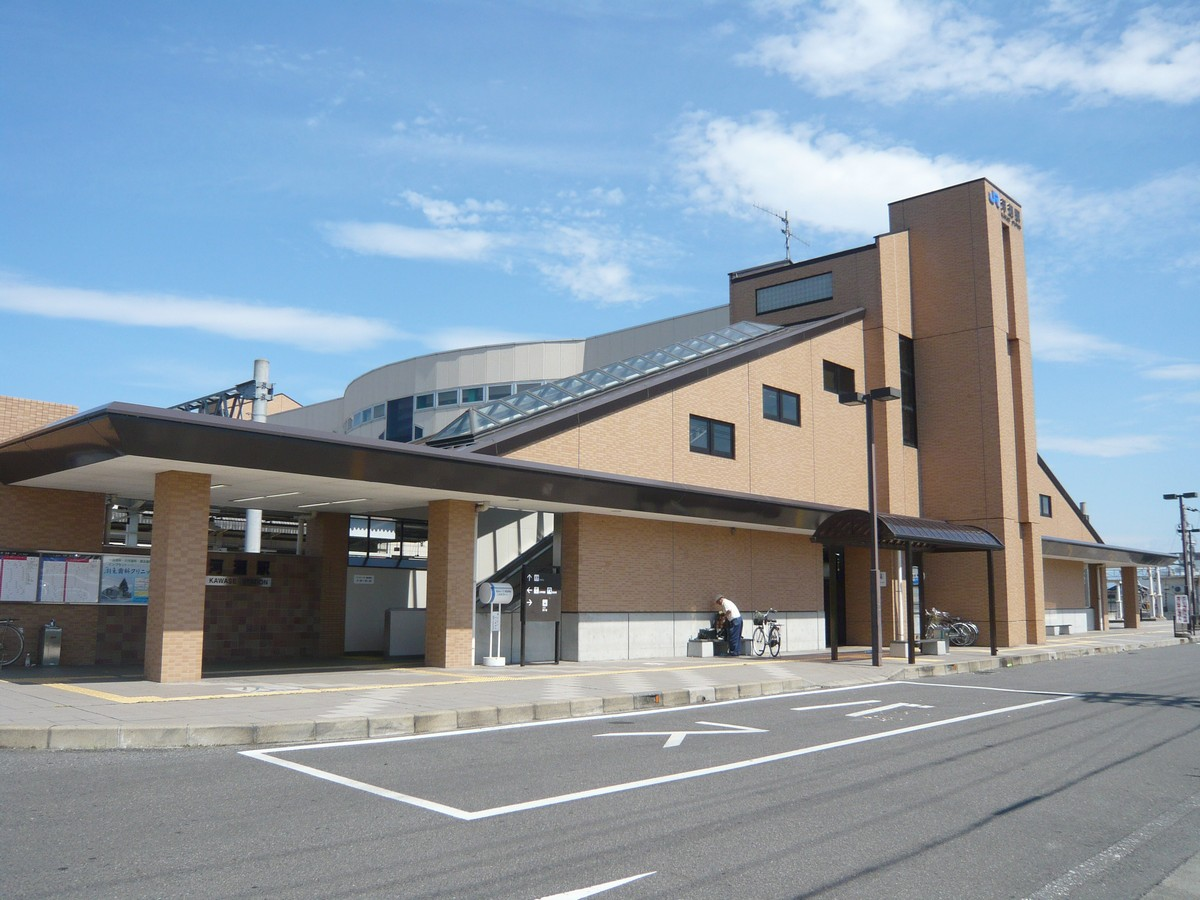
- East gate of the station, August 2007

General information
- Location: 1521-1 Minamikawasecho, Hikone-shi, Shiga-ken 522-0222; Japan
- Coordinates: 35.2254°N 136.2252°E
- System: JR-West regional rail station
- Operator: JR West
- Line: Biwako Line
- Distance: 12.4 km from Maibara
- Platforms: 1 side + 1 island platform

Construction
- Structure type: Ground level

Other information
- Station code: JR-A15
- Website: Official website

History
- Opened: 1 May 1896

Passengers
- FY 2023: 5,512 daily

Services
Preceding station	JR West	Following station
Inae towards Kyoto	Biwako Line Local	Minami-Hikone towards Nagahama
Location
- Location within Shiga Prefecture Location within Japan

Kawase Station (河瀬駅, Kawase-eki) is a passenger railway station located in the city of Hikone, Shiga, Japan, operated by the West Japan Railway Company (JR West).

== Lines ==
Kawase Station is served by the Biwako Line portion of the Tōkaidō Main Line, and is 12.4 kilometers from Maibara and 458.3 kilometers from Tokyo,

== Station layout ==
The station consists of one side platform and one island platforms connected by an elevated concourse. The station building has a Midori no Madoguchi staffed ticket office.

== Platform ==
1	■ Biwako Line	for Kusatsu and Kyoto
2, 3	■ Biwako Line	for Maibara, Nagahama and Ōgaki

== History ==
The station opened on 1 May 1896 as a station for passengers and cargo on the Japanese Government Railway (JGR) Tōkaidō Line, which became the Japan National Railways (JNR) after World War II. Freight operations were discontinued on 15 March 1972. The station came under the aegis of the West Japan Railway Company (JR West) on 1 April 1987 due to the privatization of JNR. A new station building was completed in 1998.

Station numbering was introduced in March 2018 with Kawase being assigned station number JR-A15.

== Passenger statistics ==
In fiscal 2019, the station was used by an average of 3405 passengers daily (boarding passengers only).

== Surrounding area ==
- Showa Denko Hikone Office
- Shiga Prefectural Kawase Junior and Senior High School

== See also ==
- List of railway stations in Japan
