= Fujitec-mae Station =

Railway station in Hikone, Shiga Prefecture, Japan

Fujitec-mae Station 彦根口駅
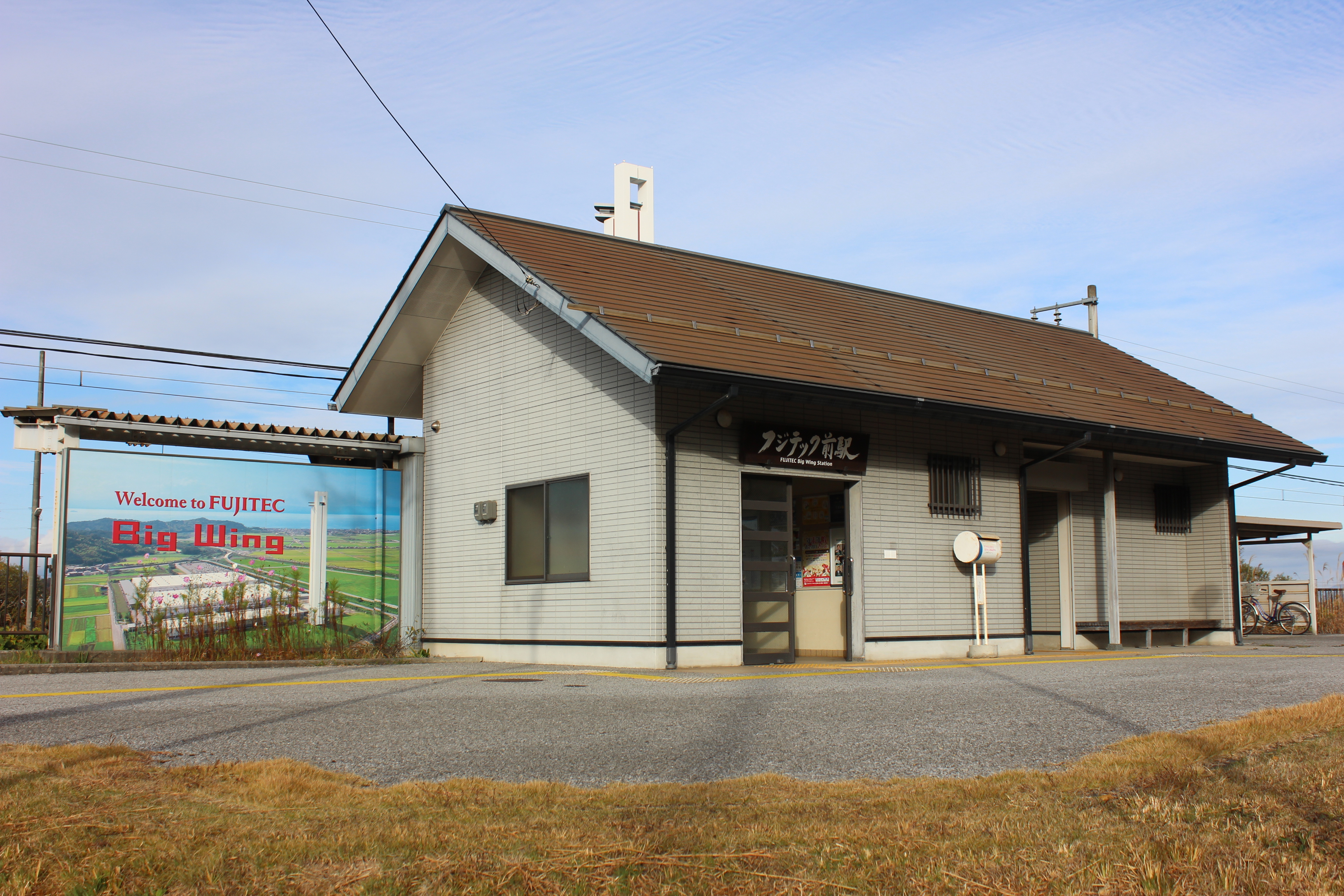
- Fujitec-mae Station in November 2020

General information
- Location: 655 Nishinonamicho, Hikone-shi, Shiga-ken 522-0038; Japan
- Coordinates: 35.2946°N 136.2857°E
- Operator: Ohmi Railway
- Line: ■ Ohmi Railway Main Line
- Distance: 2.3 km from Maibara
- Platforms: 1 side platform

Other information
- Station code: OR02
- Website: Official website

History
- Opened: 18 March 2006

Passengers
- FY2019: 228 daily
Location
- Location within Shiga Prefecture Location within Japan

Fujitec-mae Station (フジテック前駅, Fujitec-mae-eki) is a passenger railway station in located in the city of Hikone, Shiga Prefecture, Japan, operated by the private railway operator Ohmi Railway.

== Lines ==
Fujitec-mae Station is served by the Ohmi Railway Main Line, and is located 2.3 rail kilometers from the terminus of the line at Maibara Station.

== Station layout ==
The station consists of a single side platform with a length of 45 meters, which can accommodate trains consisting of three carriages or less. The station building is unattended.

== Adjacent stations ==
«	Service	»
Ohmi Railway Main Line
Rapid: Does not stop at this station
Maibara		Toriimoto

== History ==
The station opened on 18 March 2006.

== Passenger statistics ==
In fiscal 2019, the station was used by an average of 228 passengers daily (boarding passengers only).

== Surrounding area ==
- Fujitec head office

== See also ==
- List of railway stations in Japan
