= Hikone Station =

Railway station in Hikone, Shiga Prefecture, Japan

Hikone Station 彦根駅
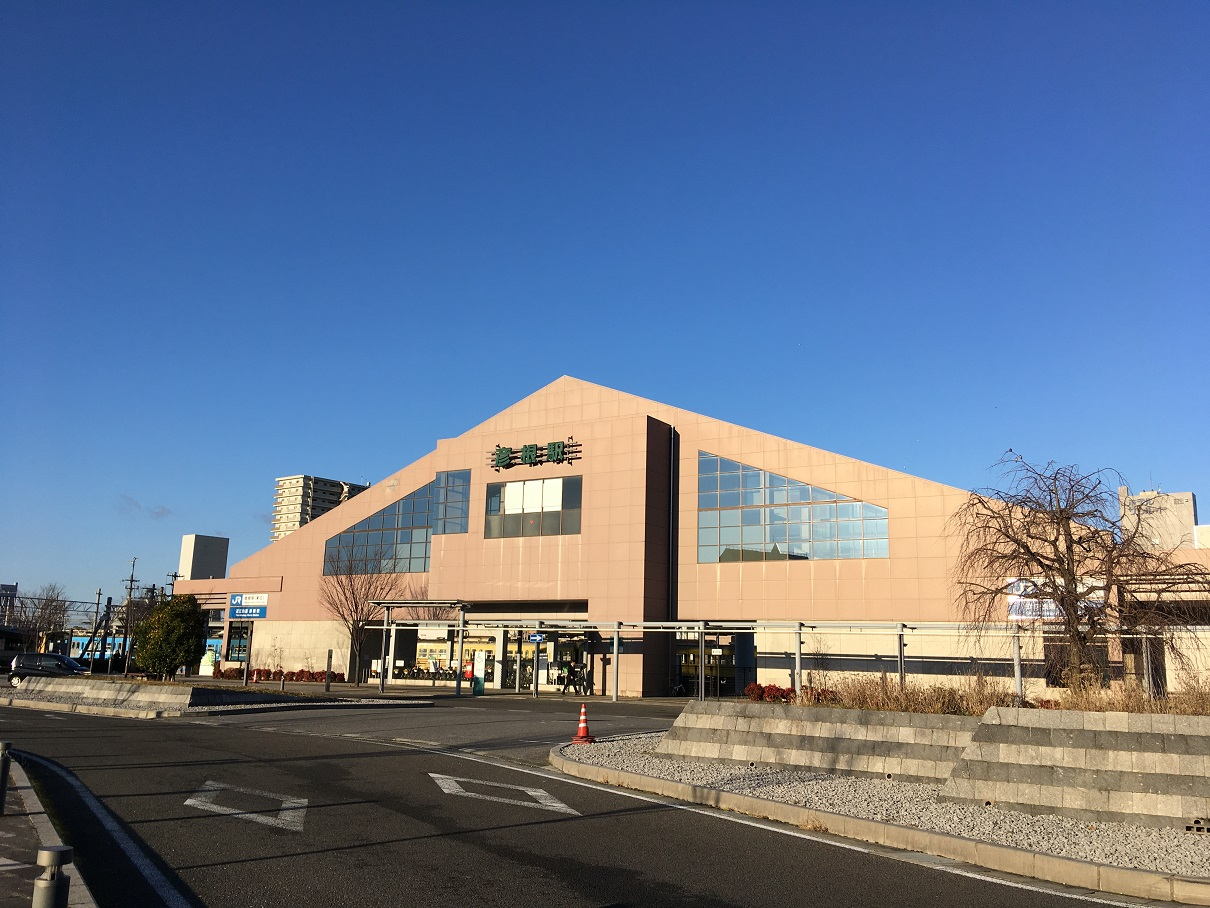
- Hikone Station east exit, January 2020

General information
- Location: Furusawacho, Hikone City, Shiga Prefecture 522-0007; Japan
- Coordinates: 35.272532°N 136.263428°E
- Operator: JR West; Ohmi Railway
- Lines: A Biwako Line; ■ Ohmi Railway Main Line
- Distance: 6.0 km (3.7 mi) from Maibara
- Platforms: 2 side + 1 island platform

Construction
- Structure type: At grade

Other information
- Station code: JR-A13

History
- Opened: 1 July 1889; 137 years ago

Passengers
- FY 2023: 19,248 daily (JR West); 1,411 daily (Ohmi Railway)
Location
- Location within Shiga Prefecture Location within Kansai region Location within Japan

Hikone Station (彦根駅, Hikone-eki) is an interchange passenger railway station located in the city of Hikone, Shiga, Japan. It is operated jointly by the West Japan Railway Company (JR West) and the private railway operator Ohmi Railway.

== Lines ==
Hikone Station is served by the Biwako Line portion of the JR Tōkaidō Main Line, and is 6.0 kilometers from Maibara and 451.9 kilometers from Tokyo. It is also a station on the Ohmi Railway Main Line and is 5.8 kilometers from the starting point of that line at Maibara.

== Layout ==
The JR Station has two opposed side platforms serving two tracks. Both platforms are connected to the ticket gate on the bridge over the tracks. The east end of the bridge, on the ground, is the Ohmi Railway station wishbone island platform. The station has a Midori no Madoguchi staffed ticket office.

== Platform ==
1	■ Biwako Line	for Maibara, Nagahama and Ōgaki
2	■ Biwako Line	for Kusatsu and Kyoto

1	■ Ohmi Railway Main Line	for Taga Taisha-mae, Yōkaichi, Kibukawa, and Ōmi-Hachiman
2	■ Ohmi Railway Main Line	for Toriimoto and Maibara

== Adjacent stations ==
«	Service	»
JR West Tokaido Main Line (Biwako Line)
Limited Express "Hida": Does not stop at this station
Maibara	Special Rapid Service	Notogawa
Maibara	Local (Rapid service when running on the JR Kyoto Line)	Minami-Hikone
Ohmi Railway Main Line
Toriimoto	Rapid	Yōkaichi
Toriimoto	Local	Hikone-Serikawa

== History ==
The station opened on 1 July 1889 as a station for passengers and cargo on the Japanese Government Railway (JGR) Tōkaidō Line, which became the Japan National Railways (JNR) after World War II. The Ohmi Railway opened on 11 June 1898. Freight operations were discontinued in November 1986. The station came under the aegis of the West Japan Railway Company (JR West) on 1 April 1987 due to the privatization of JNR.

Station numbering was introduced in March 2018 with Hikone being assigned station number JR-A13.

== Passenger statistics ==
In fiscal 2019, the JR station was used by an average of 10,489 passengers daily (boarding passengers only). During the same period, the Ohmi Railway portion of the station was used by 1,371 passengers daily (boarding passengers only)

== Surrounding area ==
- Hikone Castle
- Ryōtan-ji
- Sawayama Castle
- Shiga Gokoku Shrine
- Shiga University
- Shiga Prefectural Hikone Higashi High School
- National Route 8
- Lake Biwa
- Japan Center for Michigan Universities

== See also ==
- Hikoneguchi Station
- Hikone-Serikawa Station
- List of railway stations in Japan
