= Hikone-Serikawa Station =

Railway station in Hikone, Shiga Prefecture, Japan

Hikone-Serikawa Station ひこね芹川駅
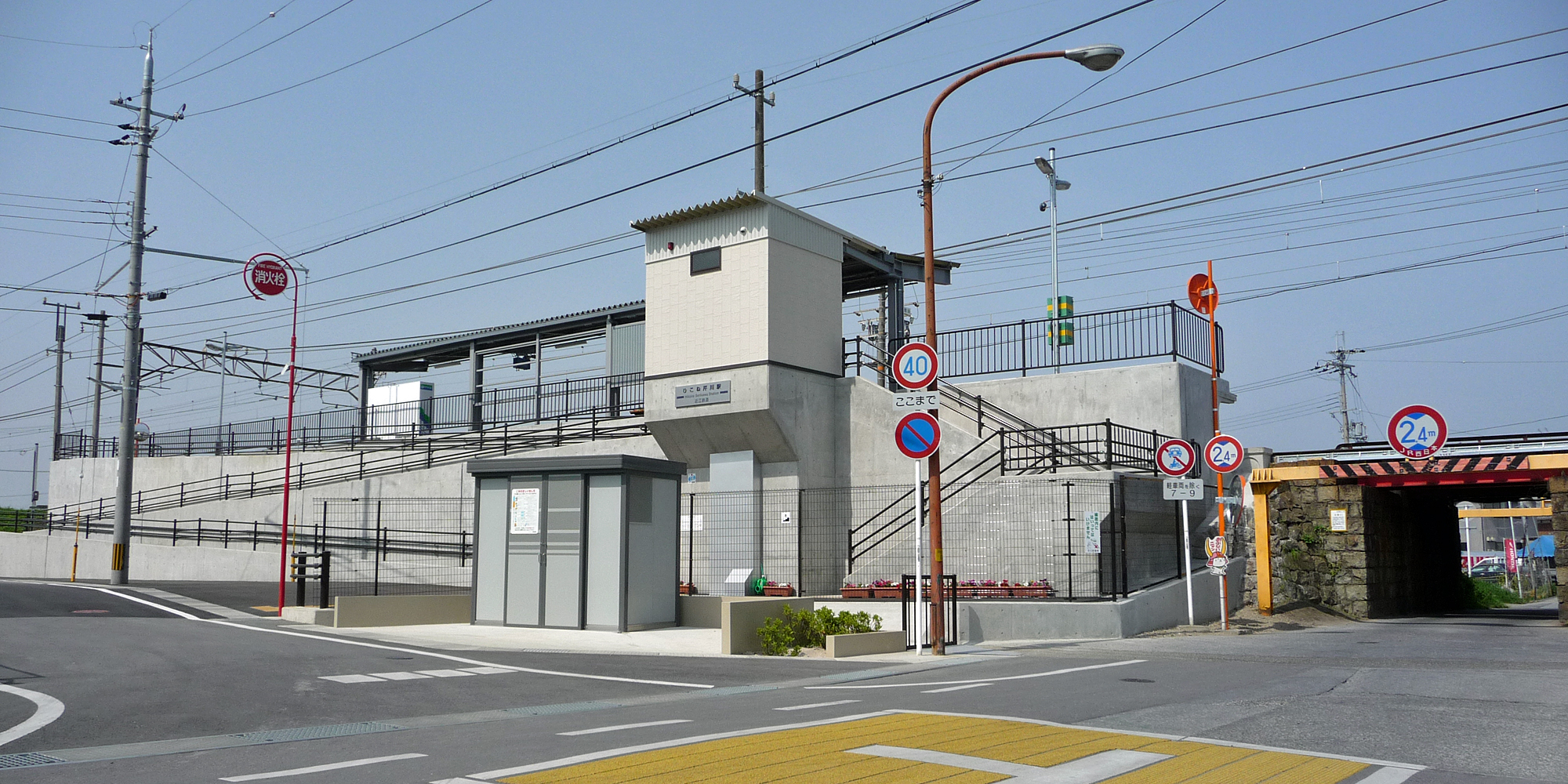
- Hikone Serikawa Station in May 2009

General information
- Location: 564 Yatate, Serikawacho, Hikone-shi, Shiga-ken 522-0033; Japan
- Coordinates: 35°15′44″N 136°15′39″E
- Operator: Ohmi Railway
- Line: ■ Ohmi Railway Main Line
- Distance: 7.0 km from Maibara
- Platforms: 1 side platform

Other information
- Station code: OR05
- Website: Official website

History
- Opened: April 8, 2009

Passengers
- FY2019: 116 daily
Location
- Location within Shiga Prefecture Location within Japan

Hikone-Serikawa Station (ひこね芹川駅, Hikone-Serikawa-eki) is a passenger railway station in located in the city of Hikone, Shiga Prefecture, Japan, operated by the private railway operator Ohmi Railway.

== Lines ==
Hikone-Serikawa Station is served by the Ohmi Railway Main Line, and is located 7.0 rail kilometers from the terminus of the line at Maibara Station.

== Station layout ==
The station consists of one side platform serving a single track. There is no station building, only a shelter on the platform. The station is unattended.

== Adjacent stations ==
«	Service	»
Ohmi Railway Main Line
Rapid: Does not stop at this station
Hikone	Local	Hikoneguchi

== History ==
The station opened on 8 March 2009 is the newest station of Ohmi Railway.

== Passenger statistics ==
In fiscal 2019, the station was used by an average of 116 passengers daily (boarding passengers only).

== Surrounding area ==
- Hikone Municipal Sawayama Elementary School
- Hikone Municipal Higashi Junior High School
- Hikone Comprehensive High School
- Serigawa River

== See also ==
- List of railway stations in Japan
