= Toriimoto Station =

Railway station in Hikone, Shiga Prefecture, Japan

Toriimoto Station 彦根口駅
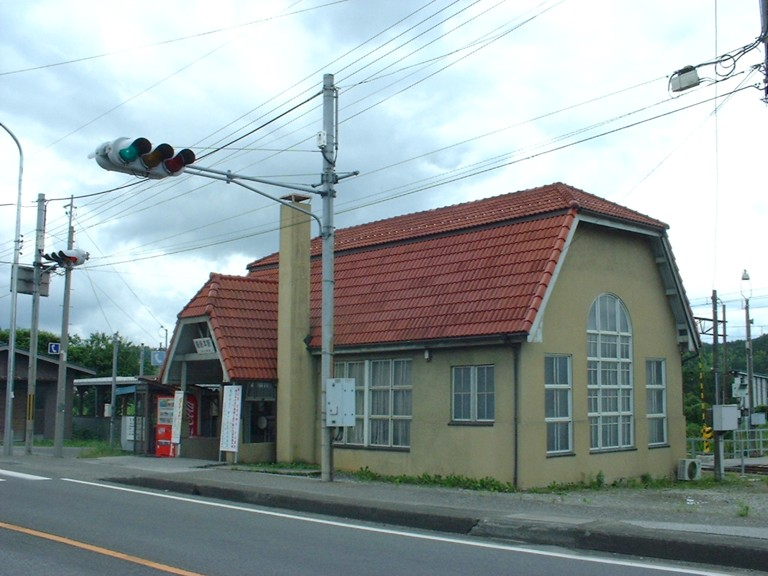
- Toriimoto Station in July 2007

General information
- Location: 647 Toriimotocho, Hikone-shi, Shiga-ken 522-0004; Japan
- Coordinates: 35.2849°N 136.2829°E
- Operator: Ohmi Railway
- Line: ■ Ohmi Railway Main Line
- Distance: 3.4 km from Maibara
- Platforms: 1 side platform

Other information
- Station code: OR03
- Website: Official website

History
- Opened: March 15, 1931

Passengers
- FY2019: 103 daily
Location
- Location within Shiga Prefecture Location within Japan

Toriimoto Station (鳥居本駅, Toriimoto-eki) is a passenger railway station in located in the city of Hikone, Shiga Prefecture, Japan, operated by the private railway operator Ohmi Railway.

== Lines ==
Toriimoto Station is served by the Ohmi Railway Main Line, and is located 3.4 rail kilometers from the terminus of the line at Maibara Station.

== Station layout ==
The station consists of a single island platform connected to the station building by a level crossing. The station building is unattended.

== Platform ==
■ Main Line	for Hikone and Maibara
■ Main Line	for Yokaichi, Kibukawa and Ōmi-Hachiman

== Adjacent stations ==
«	Service	»
Ohmi Railway Main Line
Fujitec-mae	Rapid	Hikone
Fujitec-mae	Local	Hikone

== History ==
Torimoto Station was opened on March 15, 1931. The station building received protection as a Registered Tangible Cultural Property in 2013.

== Passenger statistics ==
In fiscal 2019, the station was used by an average of 103 passengers daily (boarding passengers only).

== Surrounding area ==
- Hikone City Hall Toriimoto Branch Office
- Hikone City Toriimoto Junior High School
- Hikone City Toriimoto Elementary School
- Shiga Prefectural Toriimoto School for the Disabled

== See also ==
- List of railway stations in Japan
