= Fujitec =

Japanese transporting system company

Fujitec Co., Ltd.
- Native name: フジテック株式会社
- Romanized name: Fujitekku Kabushiki-gaisha
- Company type: Public (K.K)
- Traded as: TYO: 6406
- ISIN: JP3818800009
- Industry: Manufacturing
- Founded: February 9, 1948; 78 years ago
- Founder: Shotaro Uchiyama
- Headquarters: Big Wing, Hikone, Shiga, 522-8588, Japan
- Area served: Worldwide
- Key people: Takakazu Uchiyama (President and CEO)
- Products: Elevators; Escalators; Moving walkways; Automated parking systems and new transportation systems
- Revenue: ▲JPY 168.7 billion (FY 2017) (US$ 1.5 billion) (FY 2017)
- Net income: ▲JPY 8.8 billion (FY 2017) (US$ 83.5 million) (FY 2017)
- Number of employees: 9,931 (consolidated, as of March 31, 2018)
- Website: www.fujitec.com

Fujitec Co., Ltd. (フジテック株式会社, Fujitekku Kabushiki-gaisha) is a Japanese elevator manufacturer. Fujitec was founded by late Honorary Chairman, Mr. Shotaro Uchiyama in February 1948 for the purpose of research and development, manufacturing, sales, installation and maintenance of elevators, escalators and travellators.

Fujitec Singapore Corp. was established in 1988, specializing in the manufacture, installation and service of lifts/elevators, escalators and moving walkways/travellators.

The company has operational headquarters located in the Americas, Japan, South Asia, East Asia and Europe and a network of 11 manufacturing facilities and several sales service offices.

Fujitec has an elevator factory in Hikone, and an escalator factory in Toyooka, Hyōgo Prefecture, the United States (Cincinnati), Singapore, Indonesia, China (suburbs of Beijing), Taiwan, Hong Kong and South Korea, and an escalator factory in Shanghai China.

In Japan, Fujitec's “Big Wing” facility houses a 560-foot research tower, one of the tallest in the world. This facility is focused on developing new technologies and integrating all phases of product development, design and manufacturing. Fujitec's research and development facility in China is located in the Song Jiang Industrial Zone in Shanghai and is approximately 150,000 m2 (1.6 million sq. ft). This space is utilized for parts and components procurement. Fujitec America continues to utilize the landmark, blue-capped 220-foot elevator research/test tower located near its U.S. headquarters in Mason, Ohio.

In July 2025, European investment firm EQT launched a tender offer to acquire an 85% stake in Fujitec.

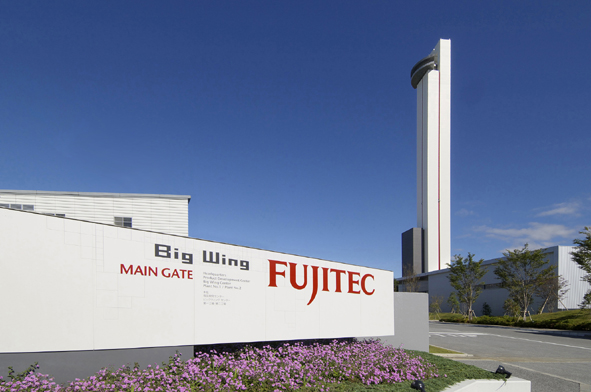
Headquarters (Big Wing) Hikone, Shiga Prefecture, Japan

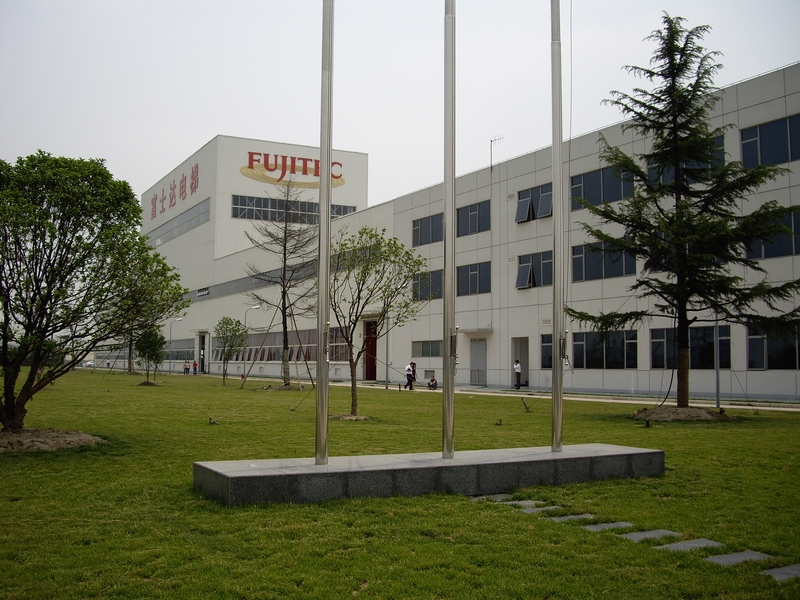
Factory in Shanghai, China

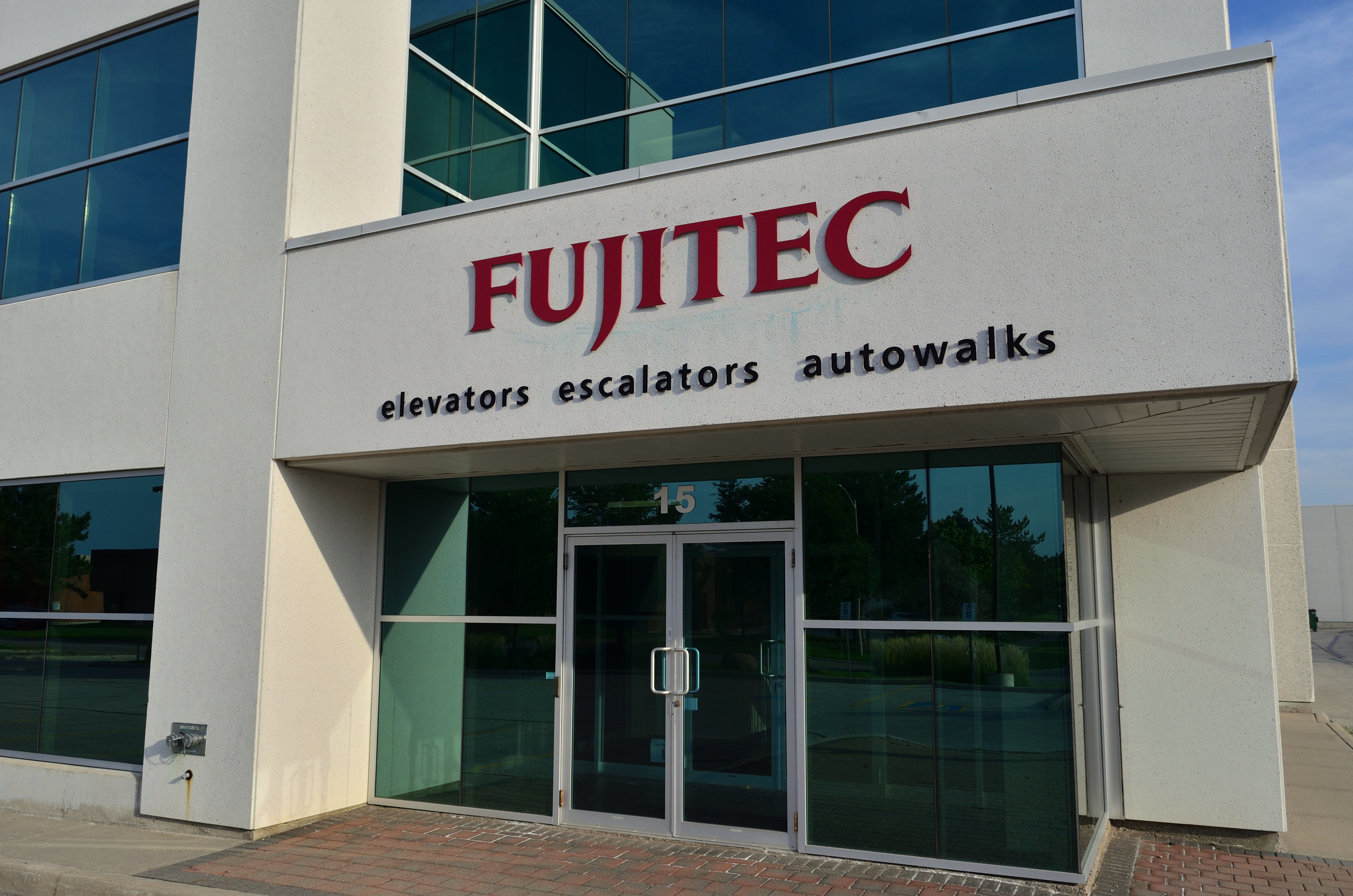
Fujitec office in North America

== See also ==
- List of elevator test towers
- Fujitec-mae Station (Ohmi Railway Main Line)
- List of elevator manufacturers
