= Palm-of-the-Hand Stories =

Short stories by Yasunari Kawabata

First edition (publ. 新潮文庫)

Palm-of-the-Hand Stories (掌の小説, Tenohira no shōsetsu or Tanagokoro no shōsetsu (Note: Kawabata preferred the reading tanagokoro for the 掌 character.)) is the name Japanese author Yasunari Kawabata gave to the type of short stories he wrote during his long career. The earliest of these stories were published in the early 1920s, with the last appearing posthumously in 1972.

The first Japanese collection under this title appeared in 1952 and contained 100 stories in two volumes. In 1971, an expanded edition was published with 111 stories, and in 1989 there was a further expansion with 122 stories (based on the 1981 publication of Kawabata's complete works). Some scholars have classified as many as 146 such stories in total. The name refers to the brevity of the stories – many of which are only two to three pages long – which would "virtually fit into the palm of the hand".

== Style and themes ==
For Susan J. Napier in the Monumenta Nipponica, Kawabata's brief stories express the facets of his novels, while at the same time "providing an intensity of focus that is the essence of Kawabata's celebrated 'haiku-esque' style", working with "evocations and suggestions". Often, the stories focus "on feelings rather than understanding", presenting "the chaos of the human heart", and depict "epiphanies, transformations and revelations". Reviewers also pointed out a "delicate lyricism" and "warmth and fragility" as well as a "cool formalism" and "sharp experimental intention and edge". Kawabata reportedly claimed to feel most at ease with the short-story form and explained that, while other writers tended to write poetry in their early years, he wrote his "palm-of-the-hand stories".

== Stories (selected) ==
- A Sunny Place (Hinata, 1923)
- The Weaker Vessel (Yowaki utsuwa, 1924)
- The Girl Who Approached the Fire (Hi ni yuku kanojo, 1924)
- A Saw and Childbirth (Nokogiri to shussan, 1924)
- The Grasshopper and the Bell Cricket (Batta to suzumushi, 1924)
- The Watch (時計)
- The Ring (Yubiwa, 1924)
- Hair (Kami, 1924)
- Canaries (Kanariya, 1924)
- Harbor Town (Minato, 1924)
- Photograph (Shashin, 1924)
- The White Flower (Shiroi hana, 1924)
- Enemy (敵)
- The Moon (Tsuki)
- The Setting Sun (落日)
- The Incident of the Dead Face (Shinigao no dekigoto, 1925)
- Chastity under the Roof (屋根の下の貞操)
- The Sea (海, c. 1925)
- Glass (Garasu, 1925)
- The O-Shin Jizō (Oshin jizō, 1925)
- The Sliding Rock (Suberi iwa, 1925)
- Thank You (Arigatō, 1925)
- Hurrah (Banzai)
- The Silverberry Thief (Gumi nusutto, 1925)
- Summer Shoes (Natsu no kutsu, 1926)
- A Child's Viewpoint (Kodomo no tachiba, 1926)
- Love Suicides (心中, Shinjū, 1926)
- The Princess of the Dragon Palace (竜宮の乙姫)
- The Maidens' Prayers (Shojo no inori, 1926)
- Toward Winter (Fuyu chikashi, 1926)
- The Sparrow's Matchmaking (Suzume no baishaku, 1926)
- The Hat Incident (Bōshi jiken, 1926)
- One Person's Happiness (Hitori no kōfuku, 1926)
- There Is a God (Kami imasu, 1926)
- Hands (合掌)
- Goldfish on the Roof (Okujō no kingyo, 1926)
- The Money Road (金銭の道)
- Mother (Haha, 1926)
- Morning Nails (Asa no tsume, 1926)
- A Woman (Onna)
- Frightening Love (恐しい愛)
- History (歴史)
- Horse Beauty (馬美人)
- The Young Lady of Suruga (Suruga no reijō, 1927)
- Yuriko (Yuri, 1927)
- God's Bones (Kami no hone, 1927)
- A Smile Outside the Night Stall (Yomise no bishō, 1927)
- The Blind Man and the Girl (Mekura to shōjo, 1928)
- The Wife's Search (Fujin no tantei, 1928)
- Burning the Pine Boughs (門松を焚く)
- A Prayer in the Mother Tongue (母国語の祈祷)
- Birthplace (故郷)
- Her Mother's Eye (Haha no me, 1928)
- The Third-Class Waiting Room (三等待合室)
- Thunder in Autumn (Aki no kaminari, 1928)
- Household (Katei, 1928)
- The Rainy Station (Shigure no eki, 1928)
- At the Pawnshop (Shichiya nite, 1929)
- Japanese Anna (日本人アンナ, c. 1929)
- Lavatory Buddhahood (Setchin jōbutsu, 1929)
- The Man Who Did Not Smile (Warawanu otoko, 1929)
- Samurai Descendant (Shizoku, 1929)
- The Rooster and the Dancing Girl (Niwatori to odoriko, 1930)
- Makeup (Keshō, 1930)
- The Bound Husband (Shibarareta otto, 1930)
- Sleeping Habit (Nemuriguse, 1932)
- Umbrella (Amagasa, 1932)
- Death Mask (Desu masuku, 1932)
- Faces (Kao, 1932)
- The Younger Sister's Clothes (Imōto no kimono, 1932)
- The Wife of the Autumn Wind (Akikaze no nyōbō, 1933)
- A Pet Dog's Safe Birthing (Aiken anzan, 1935)
- Hometown (Sato, 1944)
- Water (Mizu, 1944)
- The Silver Fifty-Sen Pieces (Gojissen ginka, 1946)
- Tabi (Tabi, 1948)
- The Jay (Kakesu, 1949)
- Bamboo-Leaf Boats (Sasabune, 1950)
- Eggs (Tamago, 1950)
- The Snakes (Hebi, 1950)
- Autumn Rain (Aki no ame, 1962)
- The Neighbors (Rinjin, 1962)
- Up in the Tree (Ki no ue, 1962)
- Riding Clothes (Jōbafuku, 1962)
- Immortality (Fushi, 1963)
- Earth (Chi, 1963)
- The White Horse (Shirouma, 1963)
- Snow (Yuki, 1964)
- Gleanings from Snow Country (Yukigunishō, 1972)

== English translations ==
In 1988, North Point Press published the first substantial volume of English translations as Palm-of-the-Hand Stories (scattered individual stories had previously appeared in English). It contained a total of 70 stories drawn from the early 1920s until Kawabata's death in 1972, translated by Lane Dunlop and J. Martin Holman.

The stories Japanese Anna and The Sea, which appeared in the 1920s, had not been included in Dunlop's and Holman's anthology and were translated by Steve Bradbury for the Winter 1994 edition of the journal Mānoa.

In 1998, Holman's translations of another 18 stories, which had been published originally in Japanese before 1930, appeared in the anthology The Dancing Girl of Izu and Other Stories, published by Counterpoint Press.

== Adaptations ==
The story Thank You was adapted for the film Mr. Thank You by director Hiroshi Shimizu in 1936.

Four stories from Palm-of-the-Hand Stories were adapted for an anthology film of the same title that premiered in October 2009 at the Tokyo International Film Festival and was officially released on 27 March 2010. The film contained the stories The Man Who Did Not Smile, Thank You, Japanese Anna and Immortality, with each episode directed by a different director (Kishimoto Tsukasa, Miyake Nobuyuki, Tsubokawa Takushi, and Takahashi Yuya).

Love Suicides was adapted into a 2009 short film of the same title by Malaysian filmmaker Edmund Yeo. Later in the same year, Yeo adapted Canaries into a short film Kingyo (replacing canaries with goldfish), which premiered at the Venice Film Festival.
