= Minami-Hikone Station =

Railway station in Hikone, Shiga Prefecture, Japan

Minami-Hikone Station 南彦根駅
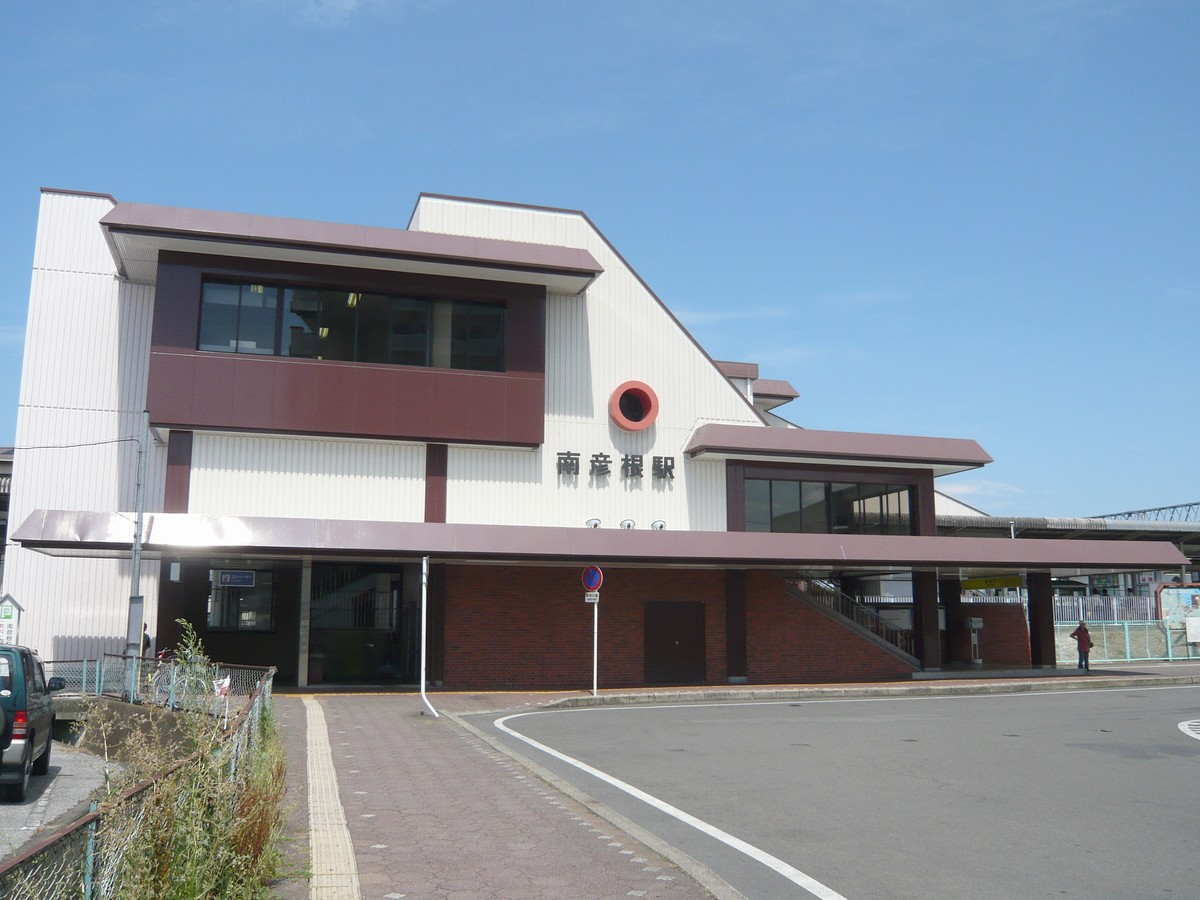
- East gate of the station, August 2007

General information
- Location: 758 Koizumicho, Hikone-shi, Shiga-ken 522-0043; Japan
- Coordinates: 35.2460°N 136.2478°E
- System: JR-West regional rail station
- Operator: JR West
- Line: Biwako Line
- Distance: 9.3 km from Maibara
- Platforms: 2 side platforms

Construction
- Structure type: Ground level

Other information
- Station code: JR-A14
- Website: Official website

History
- Opened: 30 June 1981

Passengers
- FY 2023: 10,918 daily

Services
Preceding station	JR West	Following station
Kawase towards Kyoto	Biwako Line Local	Hikone towards Nagahama
Location
- Location within Shiga Prefecture Location within Japan

Minami-Hikone Station (南彦根駅, Minami-Hikone-eki) is a passenger railway station located in the city of Hikone, Shiga, Japan, operated by the West Japan Railway Company (JR West).

== Lines ==
Minami-Hikone Station is served by the Biwako Line portion of the Tōkaidō Main Line, and is 9.3 kilometers from Maibara and 455.2 kilometers from Tokyo,

== Station layout ==
The station consists of two opposed side platforms connected by an elevated station building. The station building has a Midori no Madoguchi staffed ticket office.

== Platform ==
1	■ Biwako Line	for Maibara, Nagahama and Ōgaki
2	■ Biwako Line	for Kusatsu and Kyoto

== History ==
The station opened on 30 June 1981.

Station numbering was introduced in March 2018 with Minami-Hikone being assigned station number JR-A14.

== Passenger statistics ==
In fiscal 2019, the station was used by an average of 5901 passengers daily (boarding passengers only).

== Surrounding area ==
- Hikone Regional Joint Government Building
- Labor Welfare Center
- Hikone Driving School

== See also ==
- List of railway stations in Japan
