= Hikoneguchi Station =

Railway station in Hikone, Shiga Prefecture, Japan

Hikoneguchi Station 彦根口駅
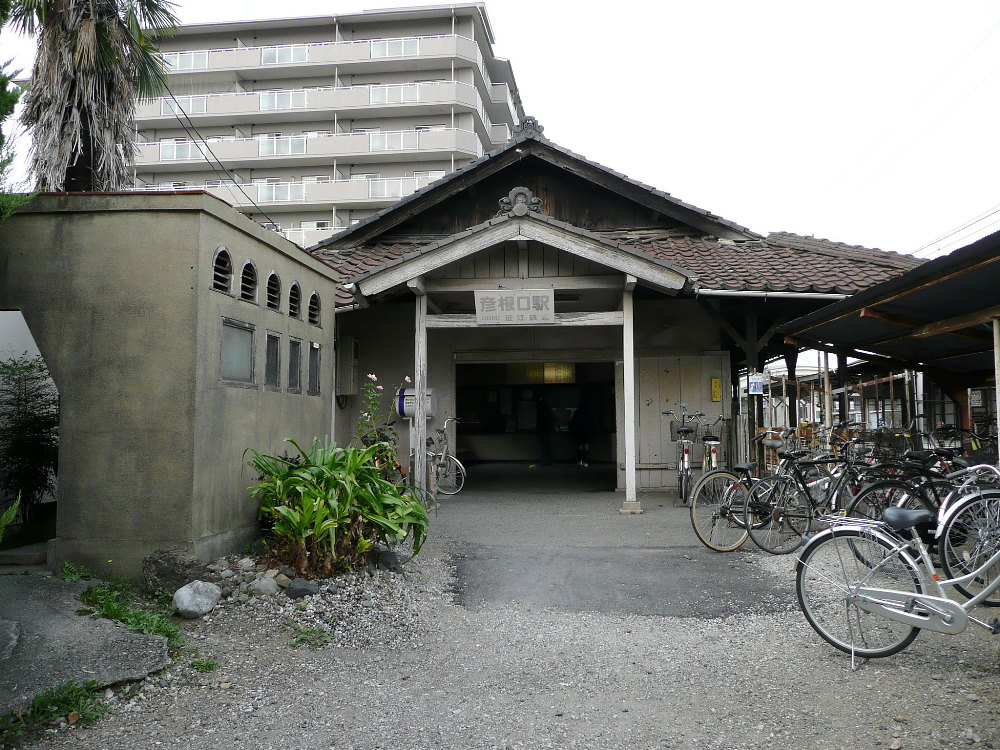
- Hikoneguchi Station in October 2007

General information
- Location: 655 Nishinonamicho, Hikone-shi, Shiga-ken 522-0038; Japan
- Coordinates: 35°15′17.02″N 136°15′29.71″E
- Operator: Ohmi Railway
- Line: ■ Ohmi Railway Main Line
- Distance: 7.8 km from Maibara
- Platforms: 2 side platforms

Other information
- Station code: OR06
- Website: Official website

History
- Opened: June 1, 1911
- Former names: Shinmachi (to 1917)

Passengers
- FY2019: 438 daily
Location
- Location within Shiga Prefecture Location within Japan

Hikoneguchi Station (彦根口駅, Hikoneguchi-eki) is a passenger railway station in located in the city of Hikone, Shiga Prefecture, Japan, operated by the private railway operator Ohmi Railway.

== Lines ==
Hikoneguchi Station is served by the Ohmi Railway Main Line, and is located 7.8 rail kilometers from the terminus of the line at Maibara Station.

== Station layout ==
The station consists of two opposed side platforms connected to the station building by a level crossing. The station building is unattended.

== Platform ==
■ Main Line	for Hikone and Maibara
■ Main Line	for Yokaichi, Kibukawa and Ōmi-Hachiman

== Adjacent stations ==
«	Service	»
Ohmi Railway Main Line
Rapid: Does not stop at this station
Hikone-Serikawa	Local	Takamiya

== History ==
Hikoneguchi Station was opened as Shinmachi Station (新町駅, Shinmachi-eki) on June 1, 1911. It was renamed to its present name on January 1, 1917.

== Passenger statistics ==
In fiscal 2019, the station was used by an average of 634 passengers daily (boarding passengers only).

== Surrounding area ==
- Shiga Prefectural Hikone Shoseikan High School
- National Printing Bureau Hikone Factory
- Hikone Driving School

== See also ==
- List of railway stations in Japan
