= Kuroda Puppet Troupe =

Puppet troupe in Iida, Nagano Prefecture, Japan

The Kuroda Puppet Troupe (黒田人形座) is a traditional Japanese puppet troupe in the style commonly known as ningyō jōruri or bunraku based in the city of Iida in Nagano Prefecture. Founded in 1688, the Troupe has performed continuously to the present.

== History ==
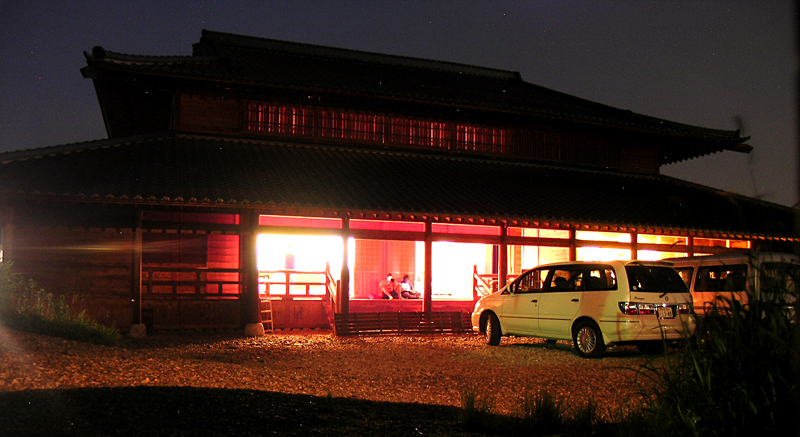
The Kuroda Puppet Hall is a municipal facility of the city of Iida.

Kuroda focuses on preserving the traditional style of puppet operation originally introduced to them by itinerant puppeteers from Awaji Island. The Troupe's current performance hall was constructed in the 1990s by the government of Iida and is built in a traditional style. The Troupe also performs several times a year at Suwa Shrine (located next to their current hall) and the Iida Puppetry Festival. Until the construction of their new puppetry hall, the Kuroda Troupe performed in a traditional theater originally built in the late Edo period. Now designated as a national treasure, the theater stands on the grounds of the Suwa Shrine.

The Kuroda Puppet Troupe also hosted a summer puppetry training program in 2006 for American students at the Kuroda Puppetry Hall in conjunction with the University of Missouri and the American-based Japanese theater group, Bunraku Bay Puppet Troupe.

== See also ==
- Bunraku
