= Imada Puppet Troupe =

Japanese puppet troupe

Imada Puppet Troupe (今田人形座, Imada Ningyōza) is a traditional Japanese puppet troupe in the style that is commonly known as Ningyō Jōruri (人形浄瑠璃) or Bunraku, based in Iida, Nagano.

== History ==
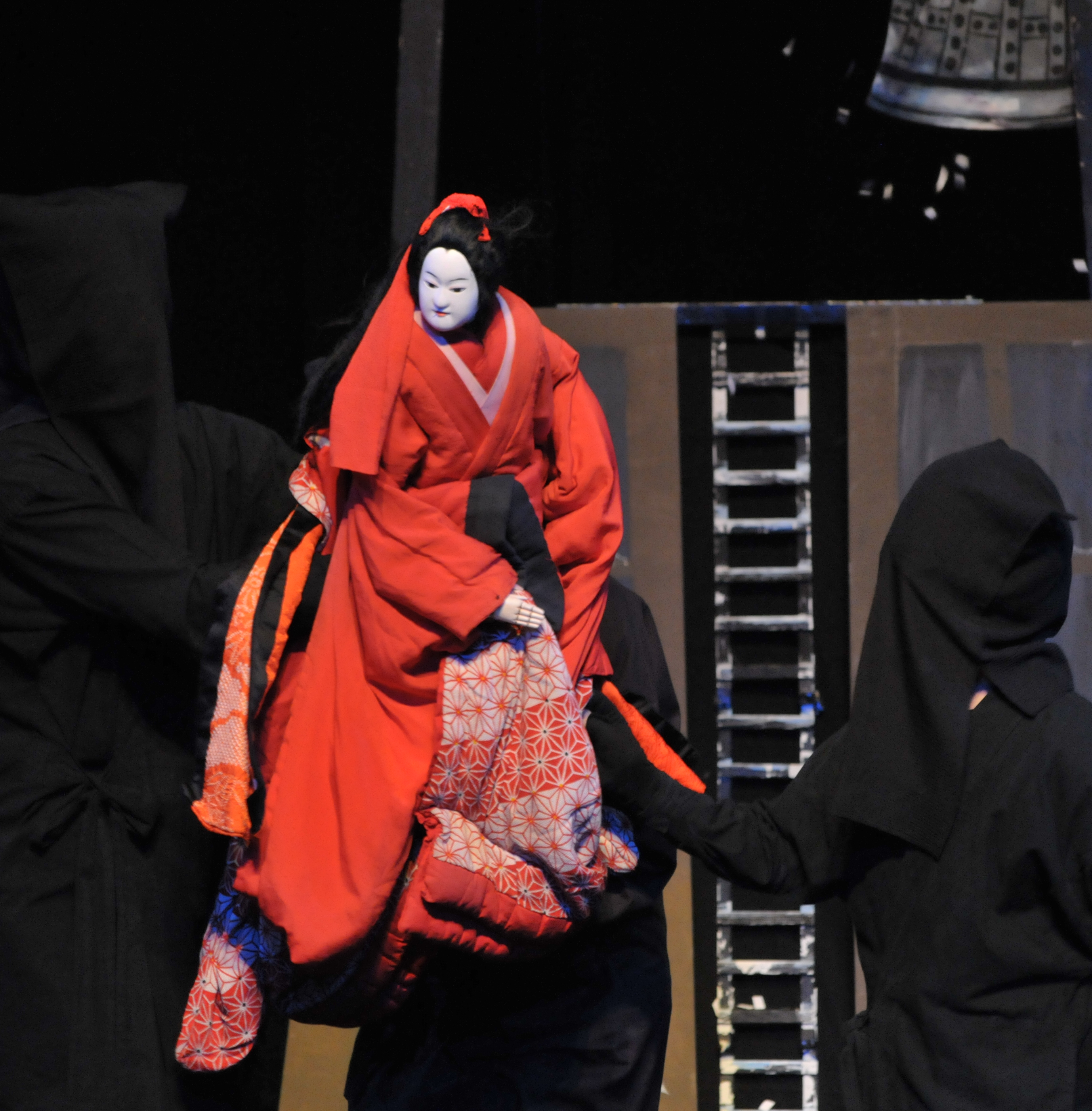
Imada Puppet Theater Performance of Yaoya Oshichi at Princeton University during their 2009 US Tour.

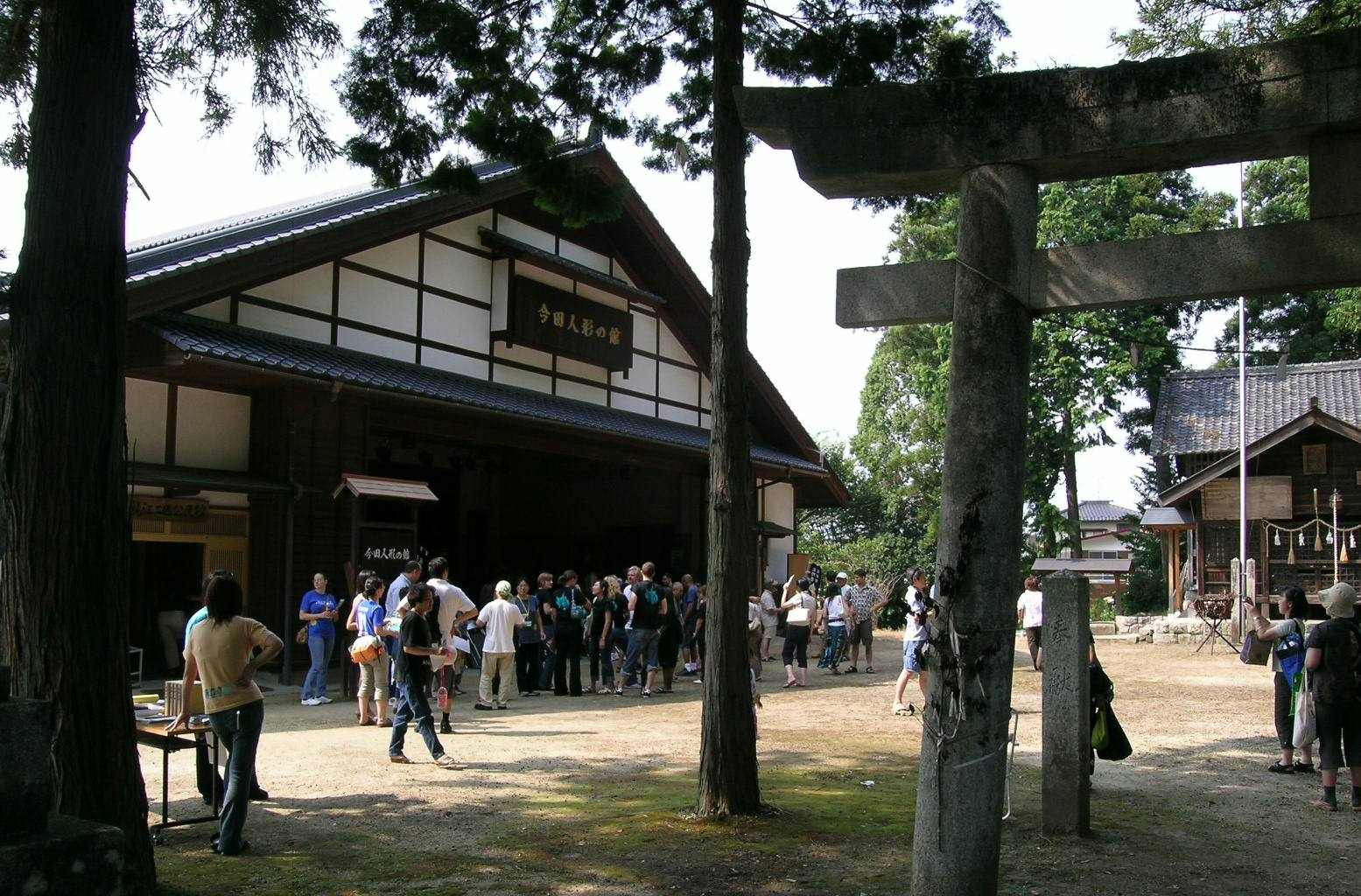
The Imada Puppetry Hall (Imada ningyō no yakata 今田人形の館) in the Tatsue District of the city of Iida in Nagano Prefecture, Japan. The Hall is located on the grounds of the Omiya Hachimangu Shrine (visible at right). The photograph above was taken during the Iida Puppetry Festival in August 2006.

The Troupe traces its origins to 1704, when a group of villagers purchased puppets to use in Shinto religious rites during the local shrine festival. In the 1820s and 1830s features of popular puppet entertainment were added to the group's performances, and by 1846 local puppeteers had begun traveling to nearby villages to perform. In the late nineteenth century the Troupe became established under its current name, enjoying considerable regional recognition and popularity.

Today the Troupe, headed by puppeteer Tamon Sawayanagi, performs regularly on tour and in its own theater, the Imada Puppetry Hall, which was completed in 1993 on the grounds of the Omiya Hachimangu Shrine in Iida. The Troupe traveled abroad in 1993 to perform in France and again in 2003 for performances in Taiwan. In 2007 members of the Troupe traveled to the United States to participate in workshops, demonstrations, and offer performances at the University of Chicago and the University of Missouri jointly with Bunraku Bay Puppet Troupe. The Imada Puppet Troupe traveled to Taiwan to perform in late August 2009, and to the United States to perform in Oregon, Colorado, Missouri, and New Jersey in October 2009.

The Imada Puppet Troupe performs a range of pieces from the repertoire common to the traditional puppet theater such as Hidakagawa Iriaizakura, Yaoya Oshichi, Kotobuki Shiki Sanbaso, Tsubosaka Kannon Reigenki, Tokaidochu Hizakurige, and many others. The Imada Troupe has also created new pieces for the traditional theater, including Kotaro Monogatari, which premiered in 1983 and was revived for the 30th Iida Puppetry Festival in 2008. Although written new for the Imada Troupe, Kotaro Monogatari is based on legendary material from the Ina Valley, in which the Imada Troupe is located.

The Imada Puppet Troupe is actively nurturing the next generation of traditional puppeteers by providing puppetry training and performance opportunities for young adults and for students at local schools. Members of the Imada Puppet Troupe also train students at Ryukyo Middle School, where a large wooden stage has been constructed specifically for the use of the school's traditional puppetry club. The Troupe also has hosted summer puppetry training programs many times for American students at the Imada Puppetry Hall in conjunction with the University of Missouri and the American-based Japanese traditional puppet theater group, Bunraku Bay Puppet Troupe.

== See also ==
- Bunraku
