= Seisen University (Shiga) =

Coordinates: 35°12′18.1″N 136°12′17.1″E

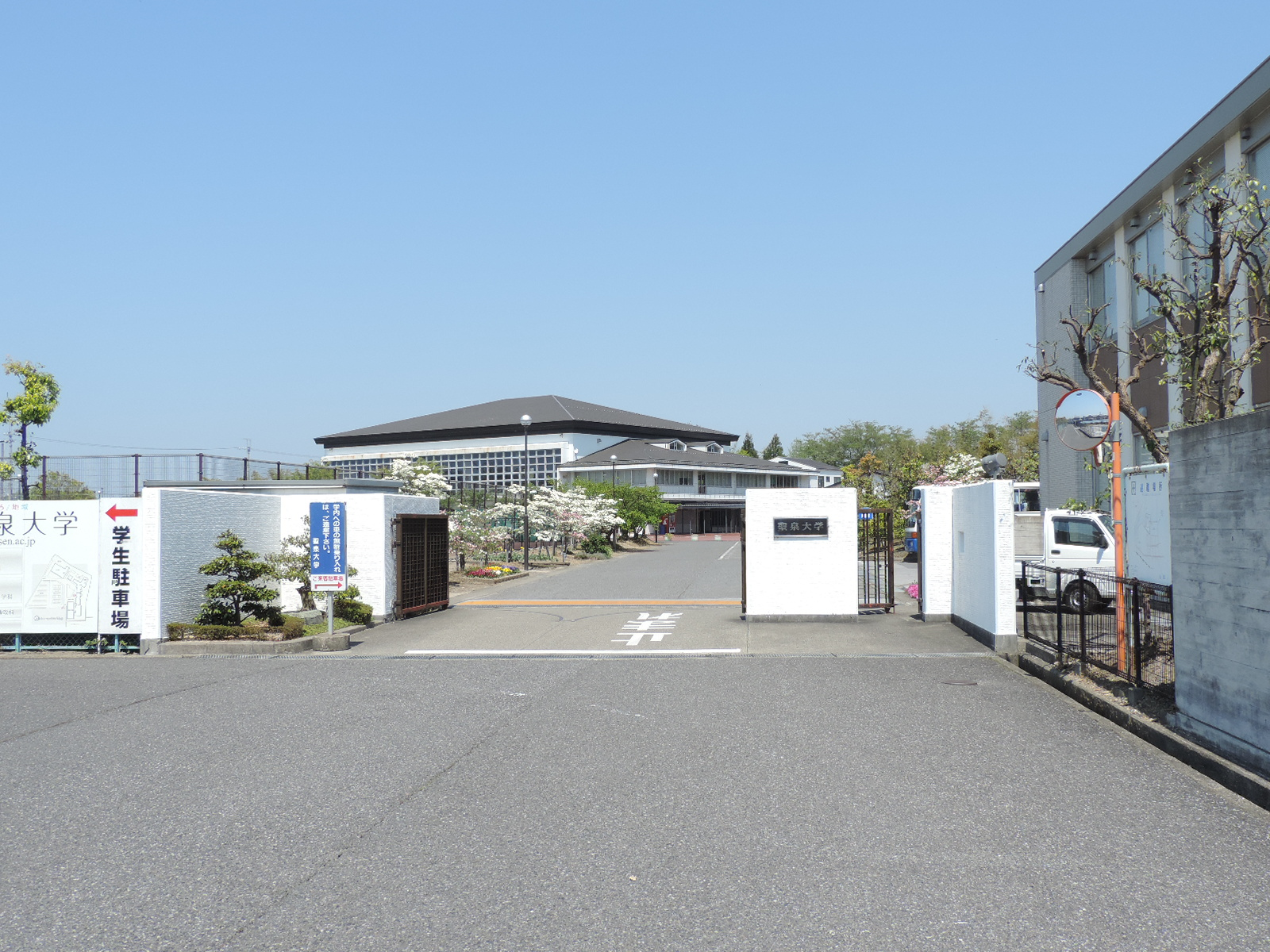
Gate of Seisen University

Seisen University (聖泉大学, Seisen daigaku) is a private university in Hikone, Shiga, Japan. The school was founded in 1985 as a junior college and became a four-year college in 2003.
