= Shigeru Nanba =

Japanese painter

Shigeru Nanba (難波滋 Nanba Shigeru, born 1944) is a Japanese painter and artist. He is based in Okayama.

== Style ==
His work consists of large oil paintings that depict traditional Japanese motifs such as Bunraku puppets in a surreal fantasy world. His work falls between postmodern Yōga and Nihonga styles.

== Exhibitions and awards ==
His work has been exhibited at various Nitten exhibitions. In 2012, he was awarded the 70th Sanyo Shinbun Prize. The prize is awarded to outstanding individuals or entities who have contributed to the societies in Okayama and Hiroshima prefectures.
