= National Bunraku Theatre =

- 国立文楽劇場
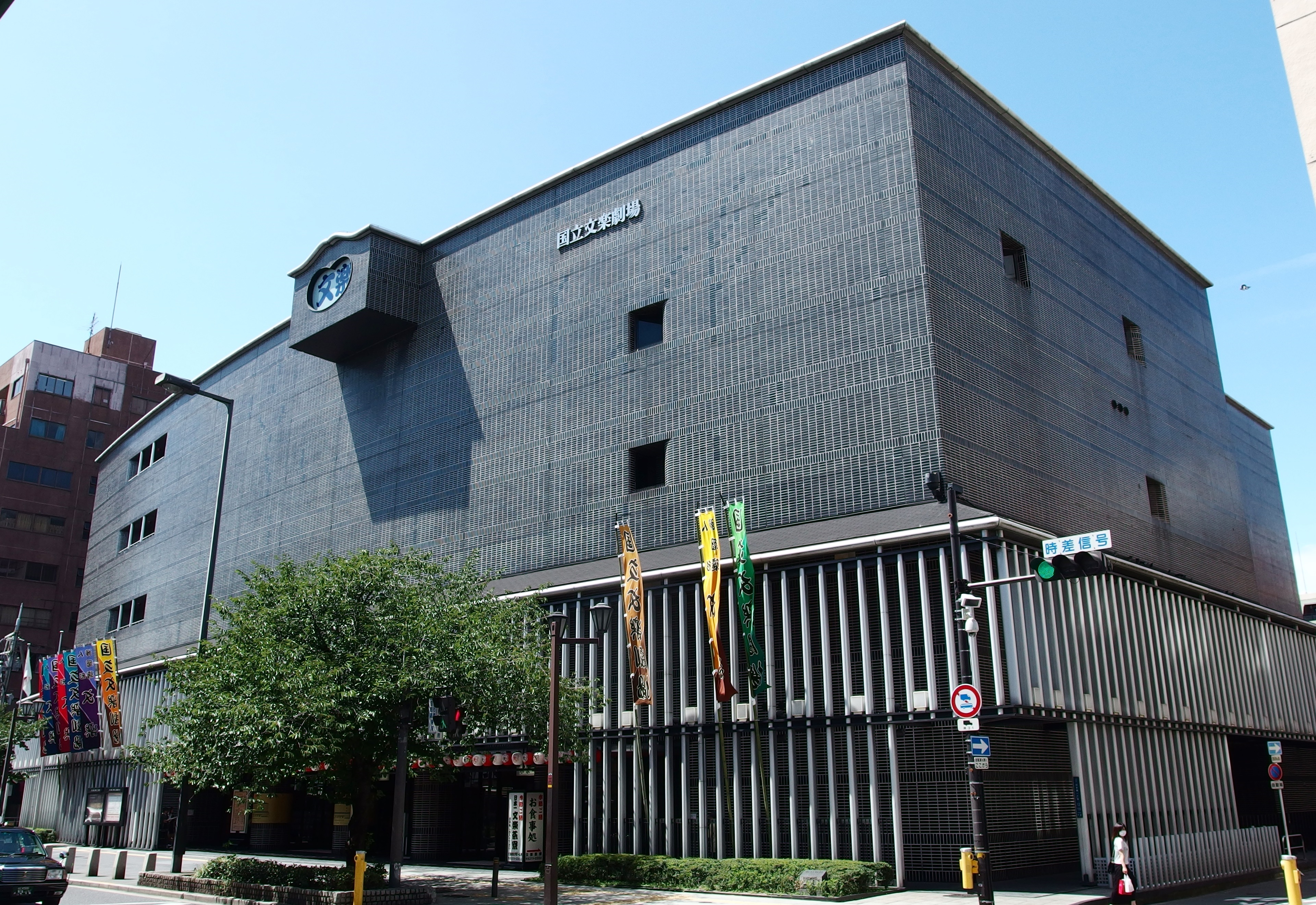
- National Bunraku Theatre
- Interactive map of National Bunraku Theatre
- Address: 1-12-10 Nipponbashi, Chūō-ku; Osaka; Japan
- Coordinates: 34°40′03″N 135°30′31″E
- Capacity: 753

Construction
- Opened: 1984
- Architect: Kisho Kurokawa

Website
- http://www.ntj.jac.go.jp/bunraku.html

The National Bunraku Theatre (国立文楽劇場, Kokuritsu Bunraku Gekijō) is a complex consisting of two halls and an exhibition room, located in the Nipponbashi district in Osaka, Japan. The complex was opened in 1984 as the fourth national theatre of the country, to become the headquarters of bunraku.

== History ==
The Japan Arts Council, an Independent Administrative Institution of the Ministry of Education, Culture, Sports, Science and Technology, operates the National Theatre.

== Outline ==
The theatre has two halls. The Large Theatre has a capacity of around 700 seats depending on stage setup, and is primarily used for performances of bunraku, as well as Buyō and stage plays. In the Small Hall are performed other type of traditional arts such as, rakugo, manzai and Japanese music.

Four times a year the Bunraku Kyōkai, the performers association which perpetuates the Bunraku tradition, present twenty-two day-long runs of performances in the theatre in January, April, July/August, and November.

As part of its mission of training new students of the form, the theatre has a library for research and space for exhibition.
