= Hikone, Shiga =

Hikone 彦根市
- City
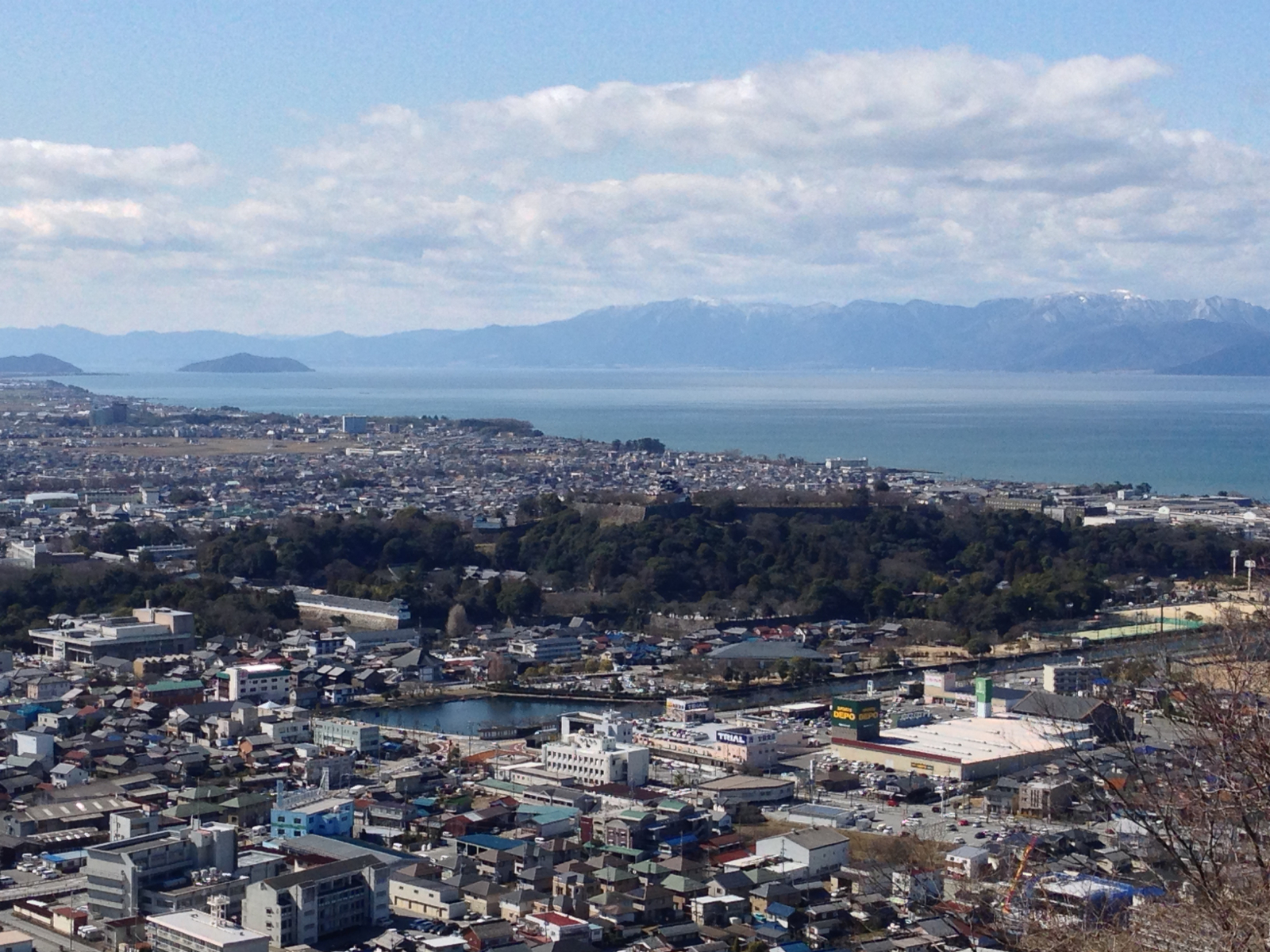
- City central, Lake Biwa and Hikone castle viewed from Sawayama castle ruin

- Flag Emblem

- Location of Hikone in Shiga Prefecture

- Location in Japan
- Coordinates: 35°16′N 136°16′E
- Country: Japan
- Region: Kansai
- Prefecture: Shiga

Government
  - Mayor: Issei Tajima (since May 2025)

Area
  - Total: 196.84 km^{2} (76.00 sq mi)

Population (August 31, 2021)
  - Total: 111,958
  - Density: 568.78/km^{2} (1,473.1/sq mi)
- Time zone: UTC+09:00 (JST)
- City hall address: 4-2 Motomachi, Hikone-shi, Shiga-ken 522-8501
- Phone number: 0749-30-6111
- Climate: Cfa
- Website: Official website
- Symbols
- Flower: Iris
- Tree: Tachibana Orange

Hikone (彦根市, Hikone-shi) is a city located in Shiga Prefecture, Japan. As of 1 August 2021, the city had an estimated population of 111,958 in 49,066 households and a population density of 570 persons per km^{2}. The total area of the city is 196.84 square kilometres (76.00 sq mi).

== Geography ==
Hikone is located in central Shiga Prefecture, on the eastern shore of Lake Biwa, and extending inland to the Ibuki Mountains. Parts of the city are within the borders of the Biwako Quasi-National Park.

=== Neighboring municipalities ===
Shiga Prefecture

- Aishō
- Higashiōmi
- Kōra
- Maibara
- Taga
- Toyosato

=== Climate ===
Hikone has a humid subtropical climate (Köppen Cfa) characterized by warm summers and cool winters with light to no snowfall. The average annual temperature in Hikone is 14.6 °C. The average annual rainfall is 1810 mm with September as the wettest month. The temperatures are highest on average in August, at around 26.4 °C, and lowest in January, at around 3.6 °C. The highest recorded temperature was 37.7 °C (July 26, 2014) and the lowest was -11.3 °C (January 23, 1904).

Climate data for Hikone (1991−2020 normals, extremes 1893−present)
Month	Jan	Feb	Mar	Apr	May	Jun	Jul	Aug	Sep	Oct	Nov	Dec	Year
Record high °C (°F)	17.2 (63.0)	20.9 (69.6)	24.8 (76.6)	28.7 (83.7)	32.2 (90.0)	36.5 (97.7)	37.7 (99.9)	37.6 (99.7)	36.5 (97.7)	32.1 (89.8)	26.1 (79.0)	21.4 (70.5)	37.7 (99.9)
Mean maximum °C (°F)	11.8 (53.2)	13.9 (57.0)	19.0 (66.2)	25.1 (77.2)	28.7 (83.7)	31.4 (88.5)	34.8 (94.6)	35.4 (95.7)	32.6 (90.7)	27.3 (81.1)	20.9 (69.6)	15.7 (60.3)	35.8 (96.4)
Mean daily maximum °C (°F)	7.1 (44.8)	7.7 (45.9)	11.6 (52.9)	17.4 (63.3)	22.6 (72.7)	26.0 (78.8)	30.2 (86.4)	32.1 (89.8)	27.6 (81.7)	21.8 (71.2)	15.6 (60.1)	9.8 (49.6)	19.1 (66.4)
Daily mean °C (°F)	3.9 (39.0)	4.2 (39.6)	7.2 (45.0)	12.4 (54.3)	17.6 (63.7)	21.8 (71.2)	26.1 (79.0)	27.5 (81.5)	23.6 (74.5)	17.7 (63.9)	11.7 (53.1)	6.5 (43.7)	15.0 (59.0)
Mean daily minimum °C (°F)	1.0 (33.8)	1.0 (33.8)	3.5 (38.3)	8.1 (46.6)	13.5 (56.3)	18.4 (65.1)	22.9 (73.2)	24.1 (75.4)	20.2 (68.4)	14.0 (57.2)	8.0 (46.4)	3.2 (37.8)	11.5 (52.7)
Mean minimum °C (°F)	−2.8 (27.0)	−2.7 (27.1)	−1.1 (30.0)	1.2 (34.2)	7.8 (46.0)	13.4 (56.1)	19.2 (66.6)	20.4 (68.7)	14.5 (58.1)	8.0 (46.4)	2.7 (36.9)	−0.9 (30.4)	−3.4 (25.9)
Record low °C (°F)	−11.3 (11.7)	−8.9 (16.0)	−7.9 (17.8)	−2.1 (28.2)	0.9 (33.6)	6.9 (44.4)	12.8 (55.0)	14.0 (57.2)	8.3 (46.9)	1.5 (34.7)	−2.4 (27.7)	−8.7 (16.3)	−11.3 (11.7)
Average precipitation mm (inches)	112.0 (4.41)	99.6 (3.92)	114.9 (4.52)	117.3 (4.62)	146.9 (5.78)	175.6 (6.91)	219.0 (8.62)	124.6 (4.91)	167.7 (6.60)	140.7 (5.54)	85.8 (3.38)	105.9 (4.17)	1,610 (63.39)
Average snowfall cm (inches)	36 (14)	29 (11)	6 (2.4)	0 (0)	0 (0)	0 (0)	0 (0)	0 (0)	0 (0)	0 (0)	0 (0)	11 (4.3)	81 (32)
Average precipitation days (≥ 1.0 mm)	14.1	12.1	12.2	10.6	9.8	11.6	12.0	8.0	10.3	9.0	8.6	13.2	131.5
Average snowy days (≥ 3 cm)	5.3	4.8	0.9	0	0	0	0	0	0	0	0	1.8	12.8
Average relative humidity (%)	75	74	72	70	71	76	77	73	75	74	74	75	74
Mean monthly sunshine hours	99.8	115.6	162.6	183.8	197.3	154.4	169.8	213.0	162.9	163.0	134.6	106.4	1,863.3
Source: JMA

== Demographics ==
Per Japanese census data, the population of Hikone has increased steadily over the past 60 years.

Historical population
Year	Pop.	±%
1920	55,280	—
1930	62,877	+13.7%
1940	64,264	+2.2%
1950	77,606	+20.8%
1960	72,931	−6.0%
1970	78,753	+8.0%
1980	89,701	+13.9%
1990	99,519	+10.9%
2000	107,860	+8.4%
2010	112,156	+4.0%
2020	113,647	+1.3%

== History ==
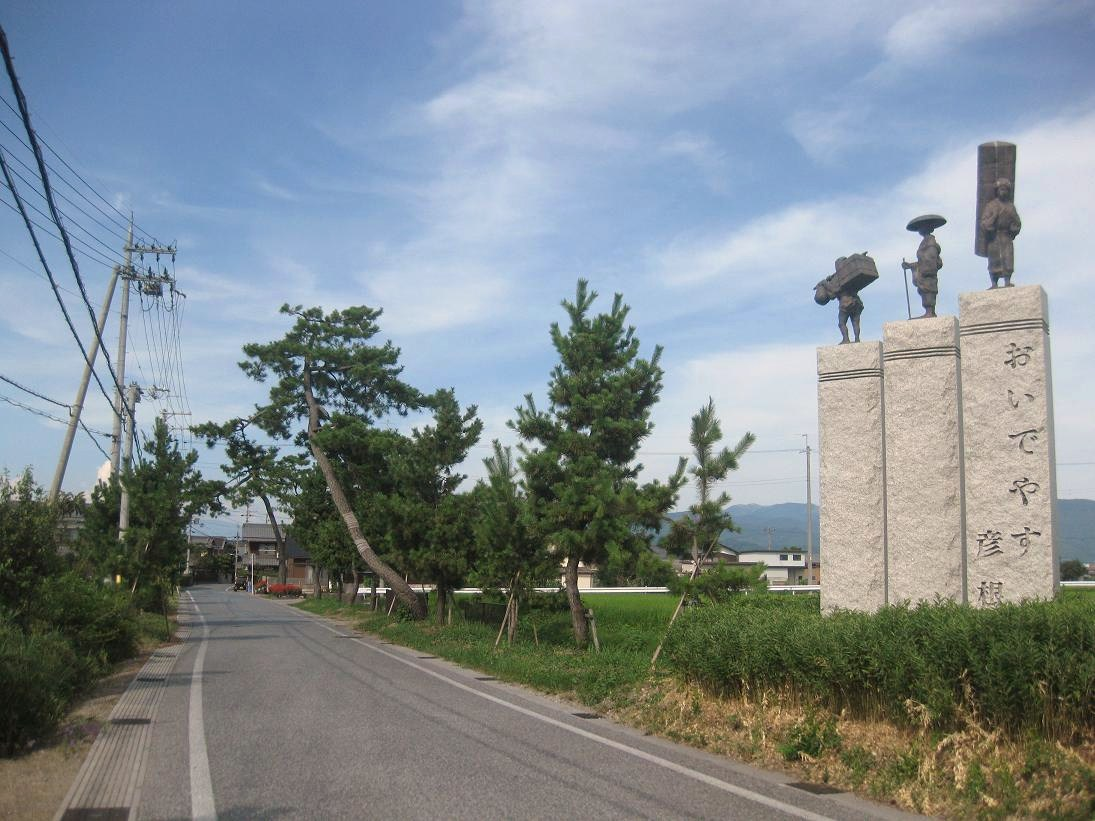
Nakasendo

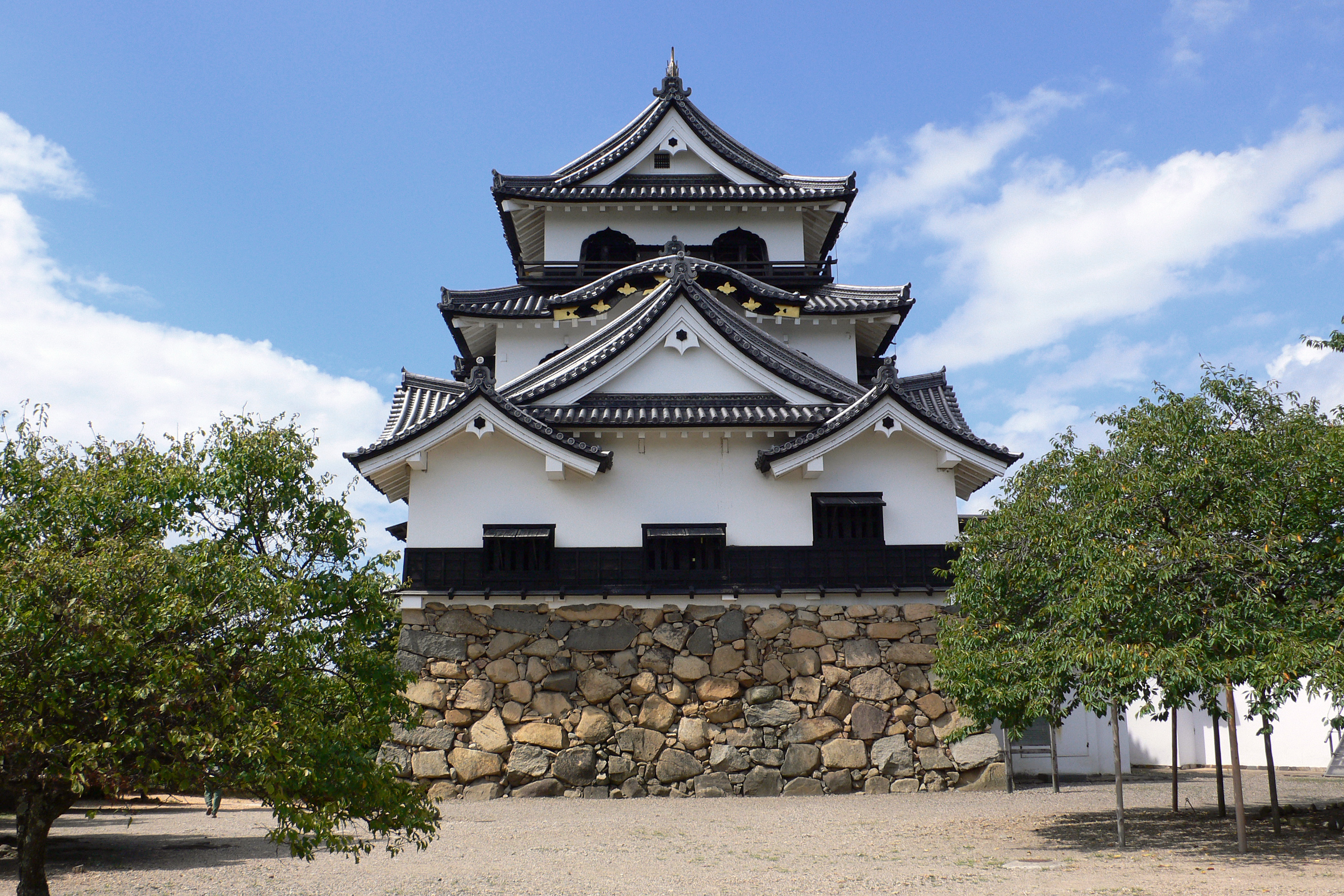
Hikone Castle

Hikone was part of the ancient Ōmi Province and was originally a market town that developed around a Buddhist temple called Hogon-ji which was founded in the Heian period. The site was a natural bottleneck on the route of the Tōsandō (later the Nakasendō) highway connecting Heian-kyō with the eastern provinces. Hikone is home to two former post stations, Toriimoto-juku and Takamiya-juku on the Nakasendō and the Chōsenjin Kaidō also passed through the area. Strategically, it was a vital point in protecting the capital from attack from the east. In the Sengoku period, this area was controlled by the Azai clan, who were based in northern Ōmi, and who built a castle called Sawayama Castle. The Azai were defeated by Oda Nobunaga, who assigned Sawayama Castle to his general Niwa Nagahide. Under Toyotomi Hideyoshi, this closest advisor, Ishida Mitsunari was entrusted with the castle. After Ishida Mitsunari was defeated at the Battle of Sekigahara in 1600, Tokugawa Ieyasu appointed his general Ii Naomasa as daimyō of a new domain centered at Sawayama Castle. Ii Naomasa began the construction of Hikone Castle, which was completed by his son Ii Naokatsu in 1622. The area remained under the control of Hikone Domain through the end of the Edo Period.

The town of Hikone was established on April 1, 1889 within Inukami District, Shiga with the creation of the modern municipalities system. It was raised to city status on February 11, 1937 by merging with the neighboring villages of Matsubara, Aonami, Kitaaoyagi, Fukumitsu and Chimoto. The city escaped major damage in World War II.

In 2003, meetings were held to discuss the merger of Hikone with the towns of Toyosato, Kōra, and Taga (all from Inukami District). However, a survey conducted by the city in February 2004, revealed that most citizens opposed the merger, leading the city government to shelve the proposal.

== Government ==
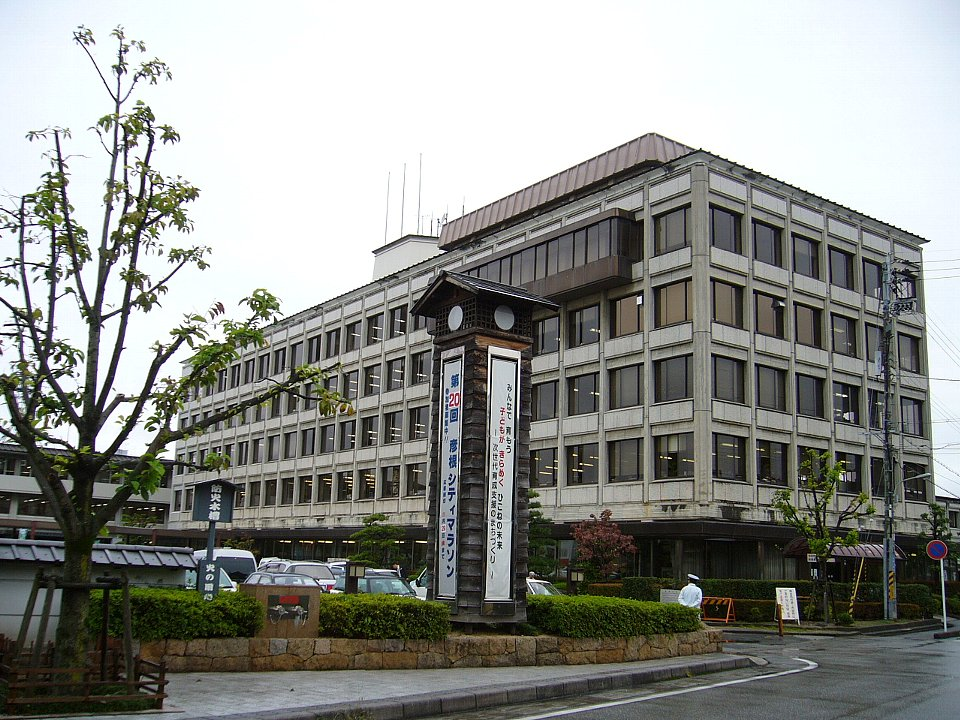
Hikone City Hall

Hikone has a mayor-council form of government with a directly elected mayor and a unicameral city council of 24 members. Hikone, collectively with the towns of Inukami District, contributes four members to the Shiga Prefectural Assembly. In terms of national politics, the city is part of Shiga 2nd district of the lower house of the Diet of Japan.

== Economy ==
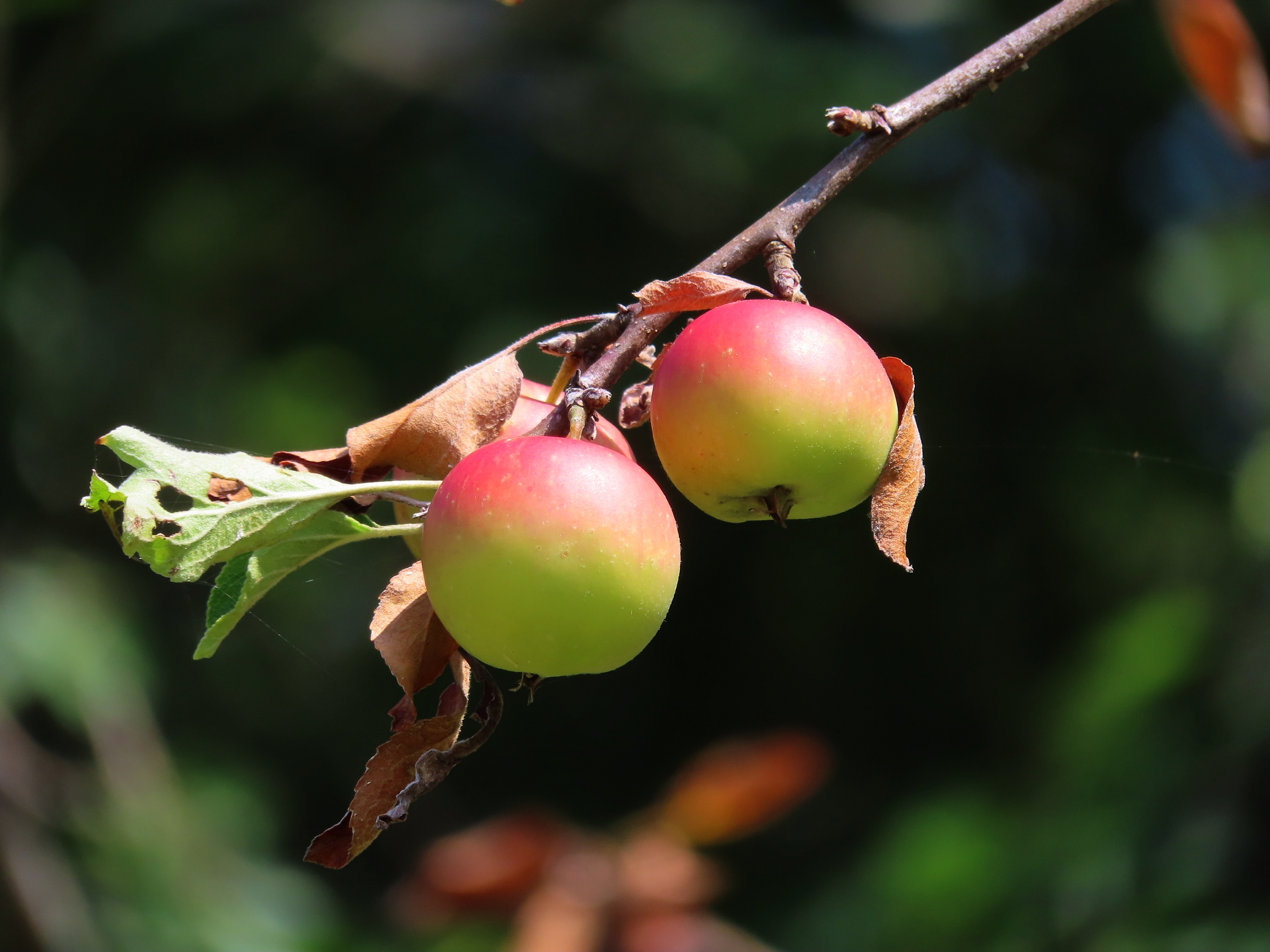
Hikone apples, a local apple cultivar

The key industries of Hikone are the manufacturing of butsudan, textiles, and valves. Bridgestone has a tire manufacturing plant here. Fujitec, Ohmi Railway, and Heiwadō (the largest supermarket chain in Shiga) are headquartered in Hikone.

In 1999, a small area south of the castle, called the Yume Kyōbashi Castle Road, was built in the old style and attracts visitors keen to see modern construction fused with traditional looks. Even the Kansai Urban Bank in this district has remodeled itself to fit in with the surrounding structures.

== Education ==
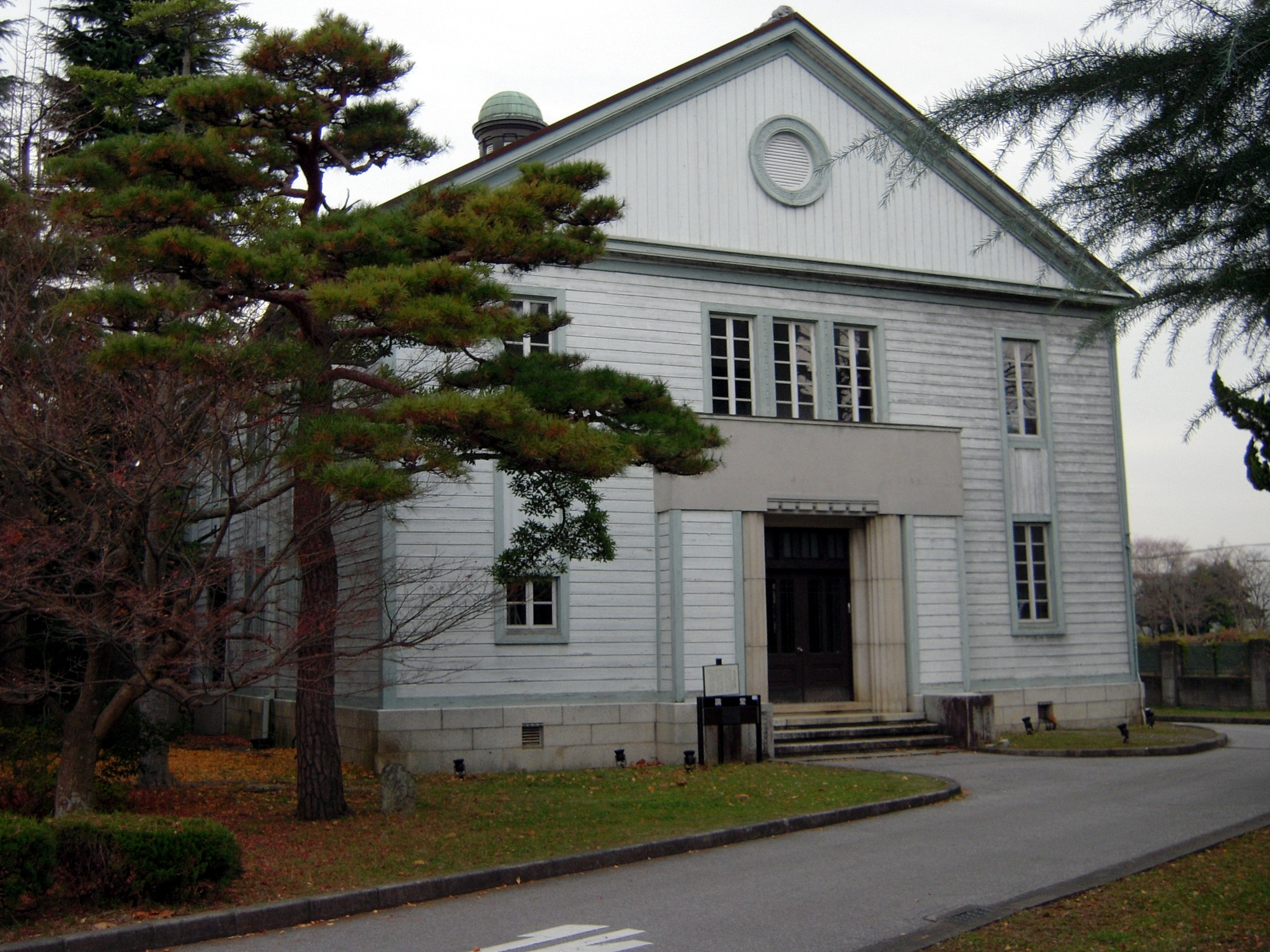
Shiga University

There are three universities in Hikone: Seisen University, Shiga University, and The University of Shiga Prefecture (USP).

Hikone is also the home of the Japan Center for Michigan Universities (JCMU), a facility operated jointly by a consortium of the fifteen public universities in the State of Michigan and the government of Shiga Prefecture (in coordination with USP) that offers programs for American university students and scholars for the study of Japanese language and culture, as well as courses in English for the citizens of Shiga Prefecture. The Michigan Center, as it is known, was founded in 1989, under the auspices of the Michigan-Shiga Sister State Agreement, the oldest such relationship between a US state and Japanese prefectures.

Hikone has 17 public elementary schools and seven public middle schools operated by the city government and one middle school operated by the Shiga Prefectural Department of Education. The prefecture also operates six public high schools and two special education schools for the handicapped. There are also two private high schools.

== Transportation ==
=== Railway ===
JR West – Biwako Line

- Hikone - Minami-Hikone - Kawase - Inae

Ohmi Railway – Main Line

- Fujitec-mae - Toriimoto - Hikone - Hikone-Serikawa - Hikoneguchi

=== Highway ===
- Meishin Expressway
- National Route 8
- National Route 306

== Sister cities ==
Hikone is twinned with the following two cities:

- Ann Arbor, Michigan, United States 1969
- Xiangtan, Hunan, China

== Local attractions ==
- Carrom, unlike in most parts of Japan, carrom is still popular in Hikone ever since it was introduced in the early 20th century.
- Hikone Castle, National Treasure and Special National Historic Site
- Kōjinyama Kofun, National Historic Site
- Lake Biwa
- Sawayama Castle ruins

== Noted people from Hikone ==
- Oniroku Dan
- Yoshihide Fukao
- Hikonyan
- Ii clan
- Yoshihide Kiryū
- Ii Naokatsu
- Ii Naomasa
- Takanori Nishikawa
- Ippei Shimamura
- Kizo Yasui
