= Japan Center for Michigan Universities =

The Japan Center for Michigan Universities (ミシガン州立大学連合日本センター, Mishigan shūritsu daigaku rengō Nihon sentaa) (JCMU) is a study center operated by a consortium of the 15 public universities in the U.S. state of Michigan and the government of Shiga Prefecture in Japan. It is located on the shores of Lake Biwa, in the city of Hikone. Founded in 1988, JCMU offers May, summer, semester, and academic-year programs for the study of Japanese language and culture for American college and university students, a substantial number of them from Michigan, and provides English language instruction to serve the needs of the local Japanese population. The U.S. administrative offices of JCMU are located at Michigan State University.

== History ==
As a part of the continuing sister state relationship between Michigan and Shiga Prefecture, in 1988, an agreement was signed by the governors of Michigan and Shiga Prefecture to form the Japan Center for Michigan Universities. In September 1989, JCMU officially opened in a temporary building, the Cultural and Industrial Exchange Hall of Shiga, in Maibara, Shiga. The following September, construction on the JCMU campus in Hikone, Shiga was completed, and courses resumed there. In October 1998, an agreement was made with nearby Shiga University to provide courses on their campus. Five years later, in 2003, a similar agreement was made with the University of Shiga Prefecture, also in the same city.

== Facility ==
The JCMU Campus

The campus is located on the shore of Lake Biwa, the largest lake in Japan, in Hikone, Shiga. It includes an academic building and a dormitory. Attached to the academic building is a Coco's restaurant. In the academic building, there are classrooms, a library, conference rooms, a traditional Japanese tatami room, a large hall for functions, and administrative offices. The classrooms feature windows overlooking the lake, the surrounding mountains, nearby Hikone Castle, and a Japanese style garden. The dormitory features apartments for both students and faculty, a fitness room, a laundry room, a computer lab, an entertainment room, and a large lobby. Each apartment contains two private bedrooms, a kitchen, and a bathroom. There is one wheelchair-accessible dorm room available.

== Academics ==
In the beginning the program was exclusively an academic year program for Japanese language and cultural studies; however, as it became apparent that this resulted in smaller class sizes, the administration expanded the program to allow students to choose to stay for only a semester.

Today JCMU typically has 6 academic programs throughout the year: the single semester program, the academic year program, the environmental sciences program, the May short program, the summer program, and the English language program for locals.

The main focus of the curriculum is intensive language study. It is loosely based on the curriculum at Michigan State University, although the professors take considerable freedom in adapting it to the needs of the facility. Students learn what they would normally learn in two semesters at Michigan State University in just one semester. During the summer, intensive language study is the only course that is offered during the eight-week term. During the two-week-long May short program, language courses are not offered but instead courses on specialized topics are offered, unique to each year.

While additional courses vary by the semester depending on the visiting professors, they have been known to include classes on culture, film, art, economics, religion and environmental science.

Other opportunities for students include staying with host families in the area, field trips, and the ability to do internships concurrently with the regular course load.

== Aichi World Expo ==
The May Guides at the USP

In the summer of 2005, Expo 2005 (the World's Fair) was held in the Aichi Prefecture of Japan. The United States, absent from the Expo 2000 in Hanover, Germany, was looking to participate in Expo 2005, and needed a facility to train guides. JCMU took on thirty young people in January 2005, primarily students, and trained them in polite language and the vocabulary that would be needed for the United States Pavilion. They were taught by the normal JCMU staff, divided into three classes due to the varying levels of ability among the guides; however, they were housed in a nearby resort hotel owned by Toyota due to the lack of space in the dormitory. In May, JCMU trained ten more guides who replaced those guides returning home early. Due to the success of the guide training program, JCMU has received more attention and praise.

== Michigan-Shiga Sister State Agreement 50th Anniversary ==
Michigan, Shiga, and JCMU began celebrating the 50th anniversary of the Michigan-Shiga sister state agreement in fall of 2017. The academic year opening ceremony in September 2017 featured the unveiling of a commemorative art piece and the planting of a symbolic tree. Michigan's Governor Snyder and Shiga's Governor Mikazuki were present, along with representatives of both governments. In September 2018, the governors met again to plant a tree in Michigan.

JCMU began celebrating its 30th anniversary at the same time, with a fundraisers, events, and a series of alumni reflections posted to their blog.

== Notable alumni ==
- Glynn Washington, host of NPR's Snap Judgement
- Taizo Mikazuki, current governor of Shiga
