= History of gay men in the United States =

Symbol representing gay men made from two interlocked astronomical symbols for the planet Mars.

This article addresses the history of gay men in the United States. Unless otherwise noted, the members of same-sex male couples discussed here are not known to be gay (rather than, for example, bisexual), but they are mentioned as part of discussing the practice of male homosexuality—that is, same-sex male sexual and romantic behavior.

== Pre-colonization ==
Two-spirit is a modern umbrella term used by some indigenous North Americans for Gender variant individuals in their communities. The presence of male two-spirits existed before European contact, and "was a fundamental institution among most tribal peoples". According to Will Roscoe, male and female two-spirits have been "documented in over 130 North America tribes, in every region of the continent". Two-spirits might have relationships with people of either sex. According to Lang, female assigned at birth two-spirits usually have sexual relations or marriages with only females. However, in most tribes a relationship between a two-spirit and non-two-spirit was seen for the most part as neither heterosexual nor homosexual (in modern-day terms) but more hetero-normative; partners of two-spirits have not historically viewed themselves as homosexual, and moreover drew a sharp conceptual line between themselves and two-spirits.

== 1600–1899 ==
=== British colonization ===
There were few openly gay men in the European colonies of North America at this time, due to legal consequences as well as social ostracism. Anal sex was specifically prohibited by a statute passed in 1563 during the reign of Queen Elizabeth I, and was copied by the North Carolina assembly in 1715.

=== 19th century ===
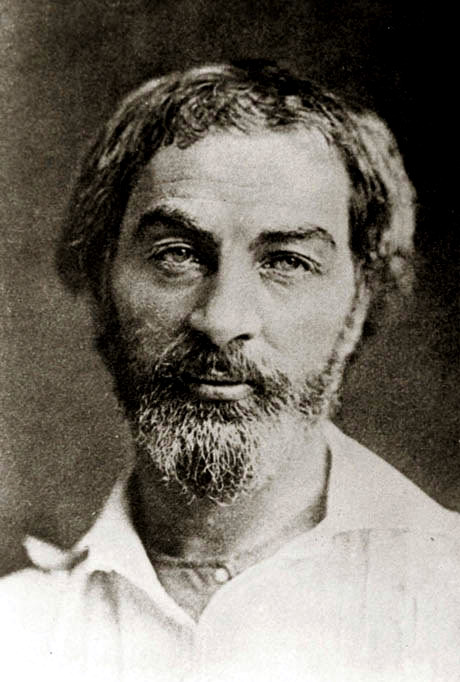
Walt Whitman, 1854

Since 1814 "crime against nature" has been used as a legal term in published cases in the United States, normally defined as a form of sexual behavior that is not considered natural and is seen as a punishable offense in dozens of countries and several U.S. states; this often included homosexual sex. Other sexual practices that have historically been considered to be crimes against nature include anal sex, as well as fellatio, bestiality, incest, miscegenation and necrophilia. The term is sometimes also seen as a synonym for sodomy or buggery. (Note: Andrews v. Vanduzer, N.Y.Sup. 1814 (January Term, 1814) (Vanduzer accused Andrews of having had connection with a cow and then a mare and the court understood this to mean that Vanduzer was going around telling others that Andrews had been guilty of the crime against nature with a beast).) Legal punishments for sodomy often included lengthy prison sentences, fines, and hard labor.

Nevertheless, there were some gay men who had an important impact on American history at this time, particularly literature. Walt Whitman, a prominent and influential American poet, is widely believed to have been gay or bisexual. In the 1860 edition of Leaves of Grass, he published a cluster of homoerotic poems under the name Calamus. Another important homoerotic book was published in 1870 by the American author Bayard Taylor, titled Joseph and His Friend: A Story of Pennsylvania. This book has been deemed the "first gay novel" in America. It has also been noted for its enigmatic treatment of homosexuality. Roger Austen notes "In the nineteenth century Bayard Taylor had written that the reader who did not feel 'cryptic forces' at play in Joseph and His Friend: A Story of Pennsylvania would hardly be interested in the external movement of his novel." Another such work is Imre: A Memorandum, written in Europe by the expatriate American-born author, Edward Irenaeus Prime-Stevenson, who originally published it under the pseudonym of Xavier Mayne in a limited-edition imprint of 500 copies in Naples, Italy, in 1906. Imre: A Memorandum is the first American gay novel with a happy ending.

== 1900–1949 ==
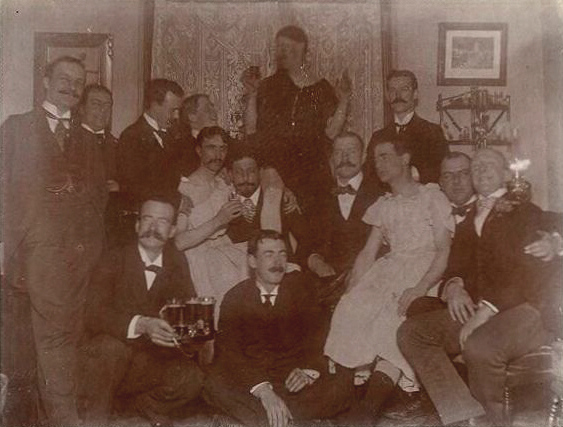
A 1900s gay private party in Portland, Oregon

The first recorded police raid in American history on a gay bathhouse took place in New York City on February 21, 1903, when New York police raided the Ariston Hotel Baths. 26 men were arrested and 12 brought to trial on sodomy charges, 7 men received sentences ranging from 4 to 20 years in prison.

The first recognized gay rights organization in America, the Society for Human Rights, was founded by Henry Gerber in Chicago in 1924. It only existed for a few months before disbanding due to the arrests of several of the Society's members. Still, it was officially recognized due to having received a charter from the state of Illinois, and produced Friendship and Freedom, the first American publication for gay people.

The gay male community gained more visibility in 1948 with the publication of Sexual Behavior in the Human Male by Alfred Kinsey, a sexologist who was bisexual. The book states, among other things, that 37% of the male subjects surveyed had at least one homosexual experience, and that 10% of American males surveyed were "more or less exclusively homosexual for at least three years between the ages of 16 and 55".

== 1950–1999 ==
=== 1950s: Homophile movement ===
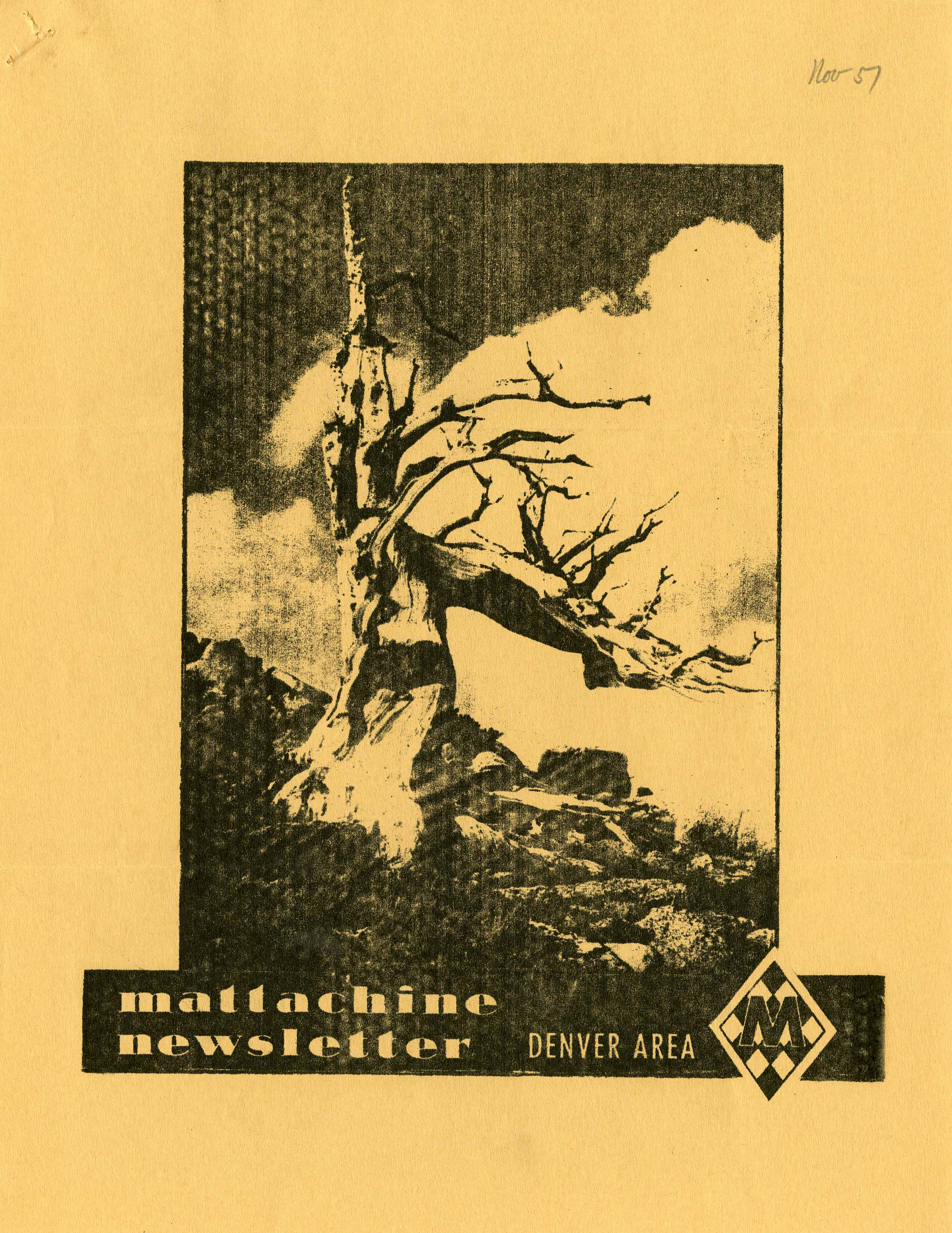
Mattachine Newsletter, Colorado, 1957, Collections of the Smithsonian's National Museum of American History

In 1950, gay activist Harry Hay and several other men founded the Mattachine Society, the first enduring LGBTQ+ rights organization in the United States. The Mattachine Society was involved in two landmark gay rights cases in the 1950s. In the spring of 1952, William Dale Jennings, one of the cofounders of the Mattachine Society, was arrested in Los Angeles for allegedly soliciting a police officer in a bathroom in Westlake Park, now known as MacArthur Park. His trial drew national attention to the Mattachine Society, and membership increased dramatically after Jennings contested the charges, resulting in a hung jury. In 1958 the U.S. Supreme Court ruled in favor of ONE, Inc., a spinoff of the Mattachine Society, which had published "ONE: The Homosexual Magazine" beginning in 1953. After a campaign of harassment from the U.S. Post Office Department and the Federal Bureau of Investigation, the Postmaster of Los Angeles declared the October, 1954 issue obscene and therefore unmailable under the Comstock laws. The magazine sued. The Supreme Court reversed the Postmaster's decision, marking the first time the Supreme Court had explicitly ruled on free press rights around homosexuality. The case is known as One, Inc. v. Olesen.

The Cooper Donuts Riot was a May 1959 incident in Los Angeles, in which gay men, lesbians, transgender women, and drag queens rioted, one of the first LGBTQ uprisings in the US. The incident was sparked by police harassment of LGBT people at a 24-hour cafe called "Cooper Do-nuts".

=== 1950s: The Lavender Scare ===
During the early period of the Cold War, homosexuality was widely regarded as a mental illness and a security risk. Government officials asserted that gay employees were at risk of being blackmailed. This is because exposure could jeopardize their careers and reputations. As historian Marc Stein argues in an interview with PBS NewsHour, the idea was that individuals whose sexual orientation had to be kept secret could then be pressured into revealing classified information. It has been argued by other historians that the fear was showing how more Cold War anxiousness was about loyalty and morality. There was hardly any evidence that suggested homosexual employees had actually compromised national security.

In 1950, Senator Joseph McCarthy asserted that communists had invaded the State Department. At the same time, congressional investigations had grown to include allegations that "sexual perverts" were employed in federal agencies. A Senate subcommittee concluded that the homosexual employees presented a security risk because they could be subject to blackmail. According to accounts from former State Department officials, there were hundreds of employees that were investigated, interrogated, and forced to resign during this period.

On April 27, 1953, President Dwight D. Eisenhower signed Executive Order 10450. The order mandated that federal agencies investigate employees for conduct considered to be inconsistent with national security, including what it described as "sexual perversion." Although homosexuality was not directly named, the policy was used to remove gay men and lesbians from federal employment.

Dismissals and investigations were continuous throughout the 1950s and 1960s. It was not until 1973 that a federal court made a ruling that sexual orientation alone could not be the only reason for termination from federal employment. In 1975, the Civil Service Commission announced that applications from gay and lesbian individuals would be considered on a per case basis.

=== 1950s–60s: Gay men in literature ===
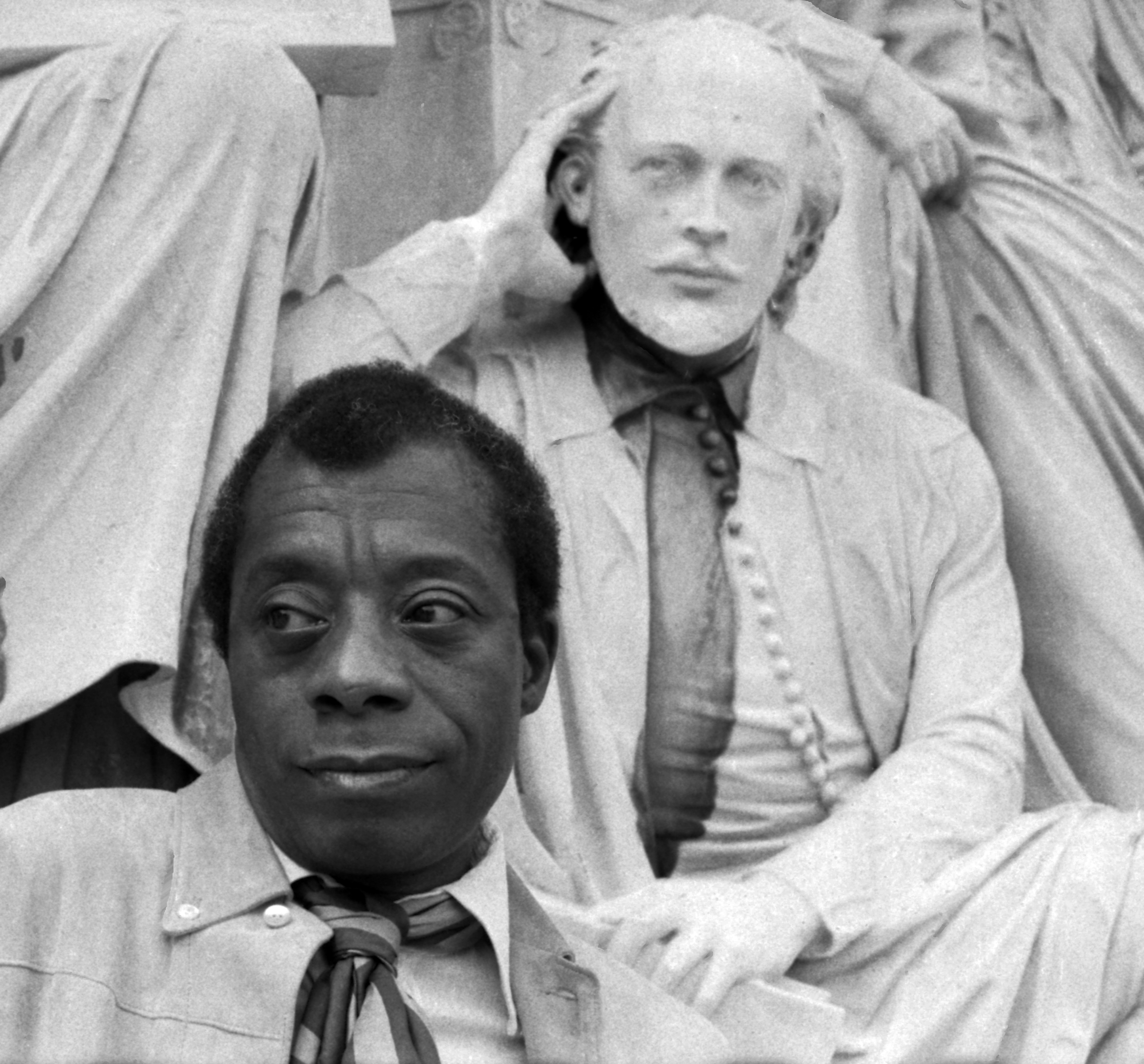
James Baldwin, a popular writer of the 1950s and 1960s wrote about homosexuality in his novel Giovanni's Room

Notable gay writers of the 1950s and 1960s who explored male homosexuality in their work included James Baldwin, John Rechy and Allen Ginsberg. Another 20th-century writer, Gore Vidal, had a lifelong male partner but preferred not to categorize himself as gay. Vidal wrote about homosexuality in The City and the Pillar (1948) and transness in Myra Breckinridge (1969). Mart Crowley's play Boys in the Band, about a group of gay male friends, was produced in 1968, then adapted into a groundbreaking film in 1970. Along with a liberalization of censorship laws, the 1950s and 1960s also saw the rise of Gay pulp fiction.

=== 1960s: Legal challenges ===
As of 1960, every state had an anti-sodomy law. In 1961, the American Law Institute's Model Penal Code advocated repealing sodomy laws as they applied to private, adult, consensual behavior. (Note: Illinois in 1961 became the first state to repeal its sodomy law. Laws of Illinois 1961, page 1983, enacted July 28, 1961, effective January 1, 1962. The History of Sodomy Laws in the United States: Illinois.) A few years later the American Civil Liberties Union (ACLU) took its first major case in opposition to these laws, Enslin v. Walford, which was denied certiorari by the Supreme Court.

Another significant case came in 1961, when astronomer Frank Kameny protested his firing by the U.S. Civil Service Commission due to his homosexuality, arguing this case to the United States Supreme Court. Although the court denied his petition, it is notable as the first civil rights claim based on sexual orientation.

In 1965 the case Scott v. Macy, about how Bruce Scott was denied a Defense Department job because of "immoral conduct", was decided. The U.S. Court of Appeals for the District of Columbia Circuit said the charge was too vague, thus granting the first major court victory for gay employment rights. The case was argued by lawyer David Carliner December 17, 1964 and decided June 16, 1965.

=== 1960s: Gay rights activism ===
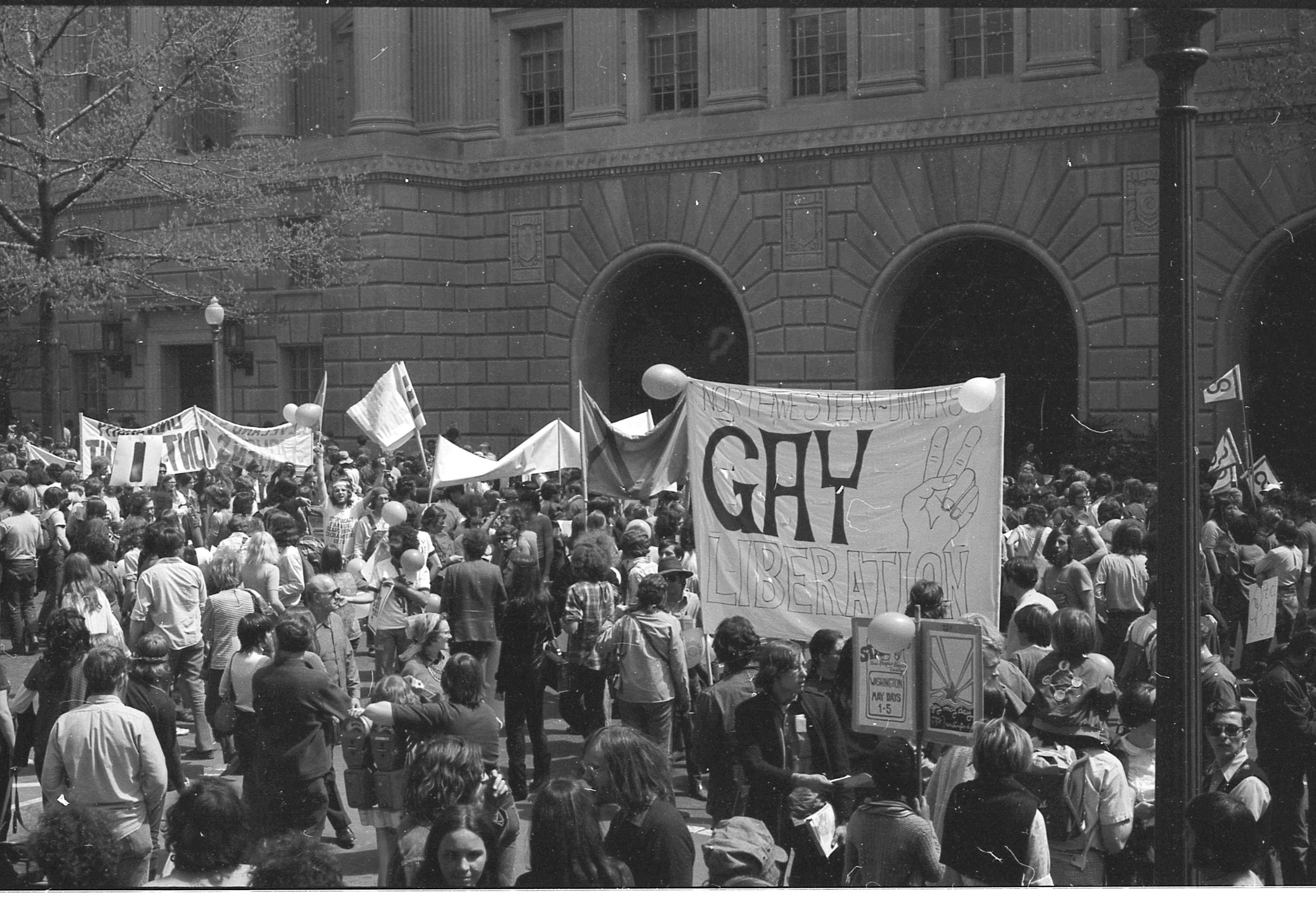
The Northwestern University Gay Liberation group in Washington D.C.

In 1964, organized by gay activist Randy Wicker, a small group picketed the Whitehall Street Induction Center after the confidentiality of gay men's draft records was violated. This action has been identified as the first gay rights demonstration in the United States.

Kameny and fellow gay activist Jack Nichols also launched some of the earliest public protests by gays and lesbians with a picket line at the White House on April 17, 1965. In coalition with New York's Mattachine Society and the Daughters of Bilitis, the picketing expanded to target the United Nations, the Pentagon, the United States Civil Service Commission, and to Independence Hall in Philadelphia, for what became known as the Annual Reminder for gay rights.

There were also several protests of legal restrictions on gay bars in the 1960s. In 1966, the Mattachine Society staged a "Sip-In" at Julius Bar in New York City challenging a New York State Liquor Authority prohibition on serving alcohol to gays. The bartender initially started preparing the men a drink but then put his hand over the glass, which was photographed. The New York Times ran a headline the next day saying "3 Deviates Invite Exclusion by Bars". The Mattachines then challenged the liquor rule in court and the courts ruled that gays had a right to peacefully assemble, which undercut the previous state liquor authority contention that the presence of gay clientele automatically was grounds for charges of operating a "disorderly" premises. With this right a new era of licensed, legally operating gay bars began. Julius Bar now holds a monthly party called Mattachine in remembrance of the protest. On January 1, 1967, there was a police raid on the Los Angeles gay bar Black Cat Tavern which led to months of protests and demonstrations. Inspired by this, The Advocate was first published in September of that year as a local newsletter alerting gay men to police raids in Los Angeles gay bars. The Advocate, which is still published, is the oldest and largest LGBT publication in the United States.

Craig Rodwell, who had conceived of the Annual Reminder (which was led by Frank Kameny and Barbara Gittings) went on to begin the pro-gay group Homophile Youth Movement in Neighborhoods (HYMN) in 1967. He also published its periodical, HYMNAL. On November 24, 1967, he founded the Oscar Wilde Memorial Bookshop in New York, the first bookstore devoted to gay and lesbian authors. Considering this and his work as the prime mover for the creation of the original pride parade (see below), Rodwell is considered by some to be quite possibly the leading gay rights activist in the early homophile movement of the 1960s.

Another important gay rights activist of the 1960s was Troy Perry. In 1968, after a suicide attempt following a failed love affair and witnessing a close friend being arrested by the police at the Black Cat Tavern (see below), Perry founded the Metropolitan Community Church. He put an advertisement in The Advocate, announcing a worship service designed for gays in Los Angeles. Twelve people came to the first service on October 6, 1968, and "nine were my friends who came to console me and to laugh, and three came as a result of the ad." After six weeks of services in his living room, the congregation shifted to a woman's club, an auditorium, a church, and finally to a theater that could hold 600 within several months. In 1971, the Metropolitan Community Church's own building was dedicated with over 1,000 members in attendance.

=== 1960s: Post-Stonewall ===
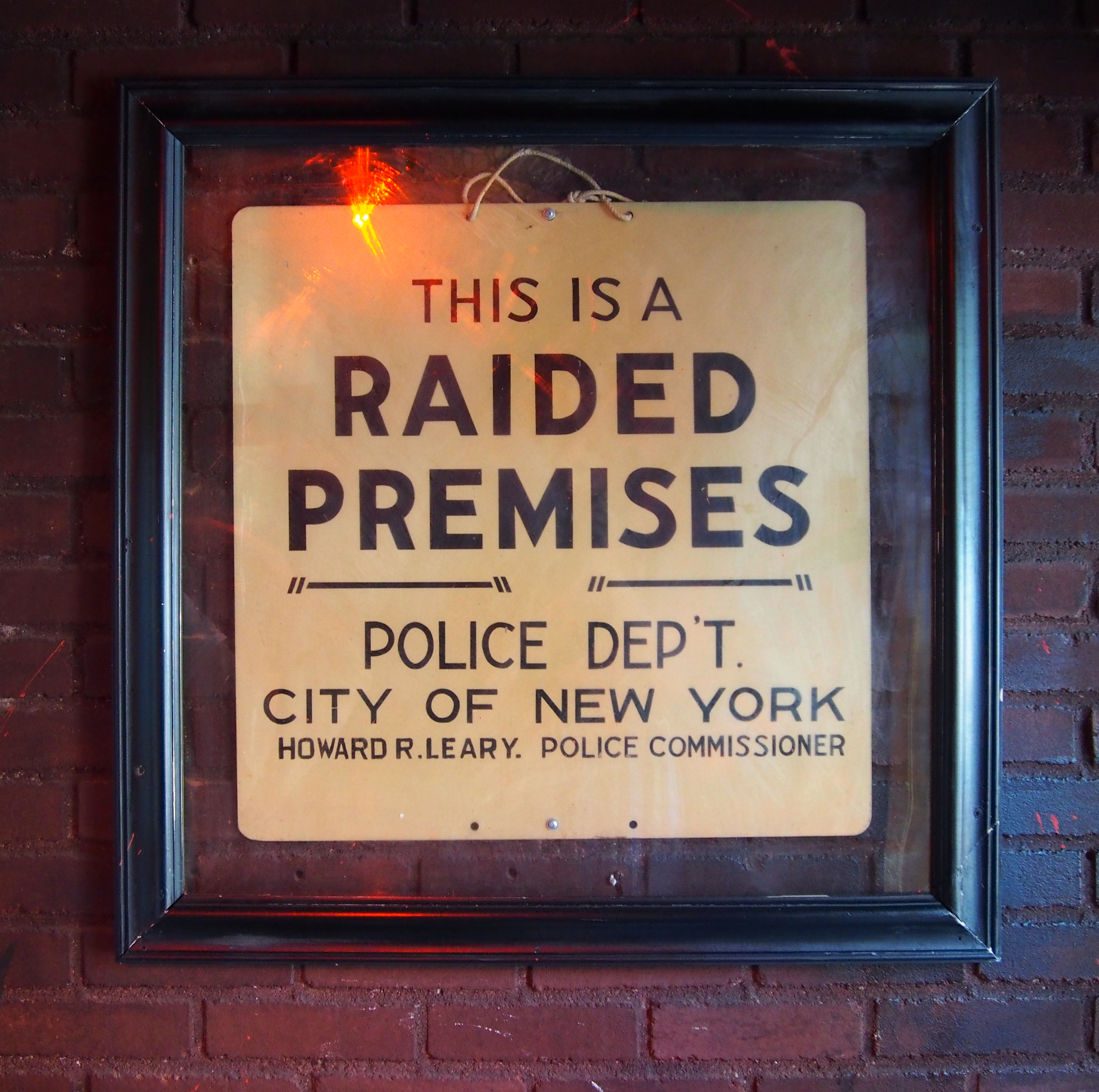
NYPD "raid sign" at Stonewall Inn

The modern LGBT civil rights movement began on Saturday, June 28, 1969, with the Stonewall Riots, when police raided a New York gay bar called the Stonewall Inn and the patrons fought back. Lesbian Martha Shelley was in Greenwich Village the night of the Stonewall Riot; she proposed a protest march and as a result the Mattachine Society and Daughters of Bilitis sponsored a demonstration. Later that year, on November 2, 1969, Craig Rodwell, his partner Fred Sargeant, Ellen Broidy, and Linda Rhodes proposed the first gay pride parade to be held in New York City by way of a resolution at the Eastern Regional Conference of Homophile Organizations (ERCHO) meeting in Philadelphia.

"That the Annual Reminder, in order to be more relevant, reach a greater number of people, and encompass the ideas and ideals of the larger struggle in which we are engaged-that of our fundamental human rights-be moved both in time and location.
We propose that a demonstration be held annually on the last Saturday in June in New York City to commemorate the 1969 spontaneous demonstrations on Christopher Street and this demonstration be called CHRISTOPHER STREET LIBERATION DAY. No dress or age regulations shall be made for this demonstration.
We also propose that we contact Homophile organizations throughout the country and suggest that they hold parallel demonstrations on that day. We propose a nationwide show of support.

All attendees to the ERCHO meeting in Philadelphia voted for the march except for Mattachine Society of New York City, which abstained. Members of the Gay Liberation Front (GLF) attended the meeting and were seated as guests of Rodwell's group, Homophile Youth Movement in Neighborhoods (HYMN).

Meetings to organize the march began in early January at Rodwell's apartment in 350 Bleecker Street. At first there was difficulty getting some of the major New York City organizations like Gay Activists Alliance (GAA) to send representatives. Craig Rodwell and his partner Fred Sargeant, Michael Brown, Marty Nixon, Foster Gunnison Jr. of Mattachine, and Ellen Broidy made up the core group of the CSLD Umbrella Committee (CSLDUC). For initial funding, Gunnison served as treasurer and sought donations from the national homophile organizations and sponsors, while Sargeant solicited donations via the Oscar Wilde Memorial Bookshop customer mailing list and Nixon worked to gain financial support from GLF in his position as treasurer for that organization. Other mainstays of the organizing committee were Jack Waluska, Steve Gerrie, Judy Miller, and Brenda Howard of GLF. Believing that more people would turn out for the march on a Sunday, and so as to mark the date of the start of the Stonewall uprising, the CSLDUC scheduled the date for the first march for Sunday, June 28, 1970.

=== 1970s: Political action ===
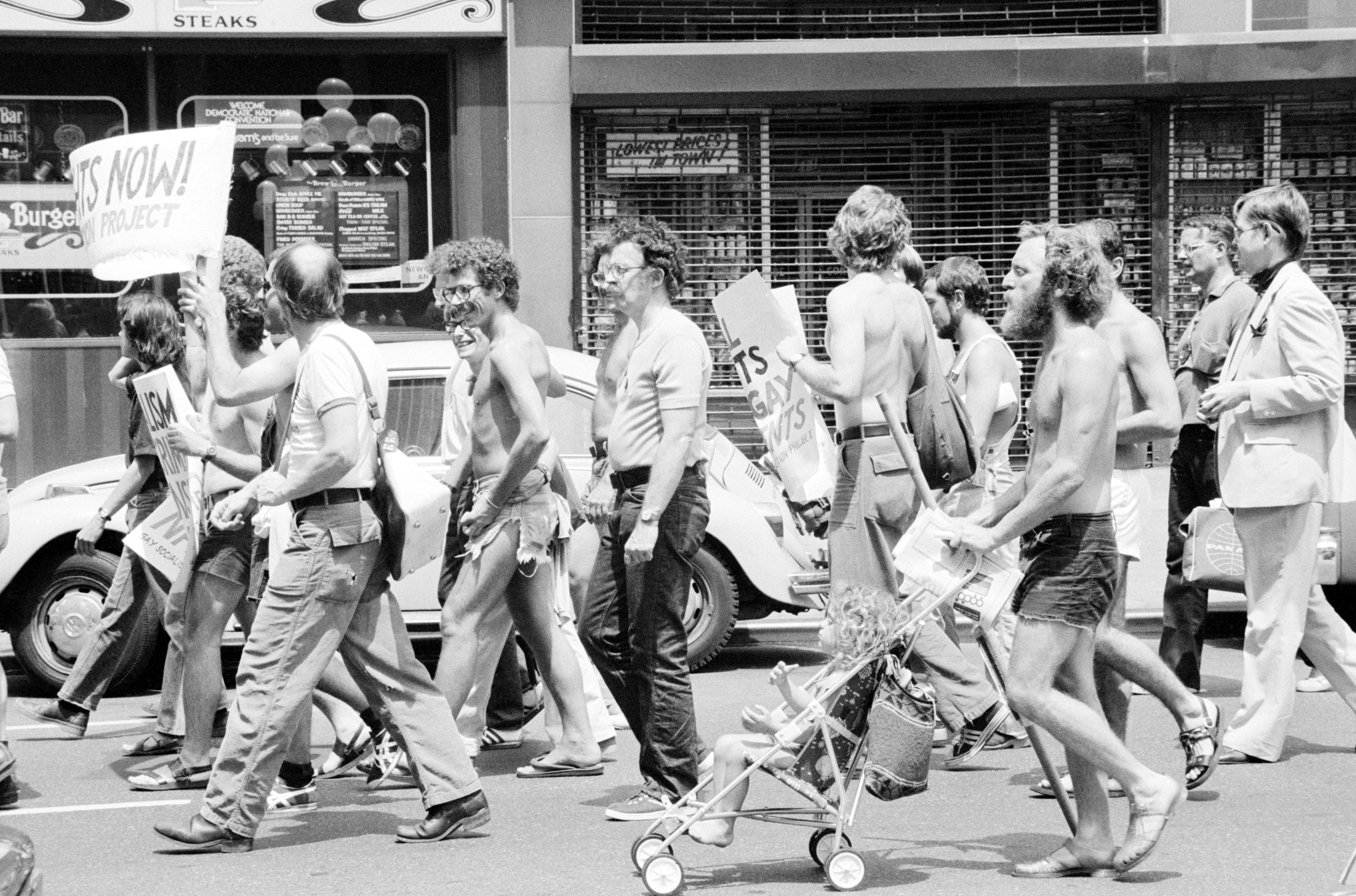
Gay Rights demonstration, NYC 1976

With Dick Leitsch's replacement as president of Mattachine NY by Michael Kotis in April, 1970, opposition to the first gay pride march by Mattachine ended. America's first pride parade was held in June 1970 in New York. There was nothing planned for the rally in Central Park, since the group could not rely on making it the entire way. Yet as the original marchers left Christopher Street to walk uptown, hundreds, and then thousands, of supporters joined in. The crowd marched from Greenwich Village into uptown Manhattan and Central Park, holding gay pride signs and banners, chanting "Say it clear, say it loud. Gay is good, gay is proud."

On the same weekend gay activist groups on the West Coast of the United States held a march in Los Angeles and a march and 'Gay-in' in San Francisco.

One day earlier, on Saturday, 27 June 1970, Chicago Gay Liberation organized a march from Washington Square Park ("Bughouse Square") to the Water Tower at the intersection of Michigan and Chicago avenues, which was the route originally planned, and then many of the participants extemporaneously marched on to the Civic Center (now Richard J. Daley) Plaza. The date was chosen because the Stonewall events began on the last Saturday of June and because organizers wanted to reach the maximum number of Michigan Avenue shoppers. Subsequent Chicago parades have been held on the last Sunday of June, coinciding with the date of many similar parades elsewhere.

The National March on Washington for Lesbian and Gay Rights, a large political rally that took place in Washington, D.C. occurred on October 14, 1979. The first such march on Washington, it drew around 100,000 gay men, lesbians, bisexual and transgender people and straight allies to demand equal civil rights and urge the passage of protective civil rights legislation.

=== 1970s: Gay men and the courts ===
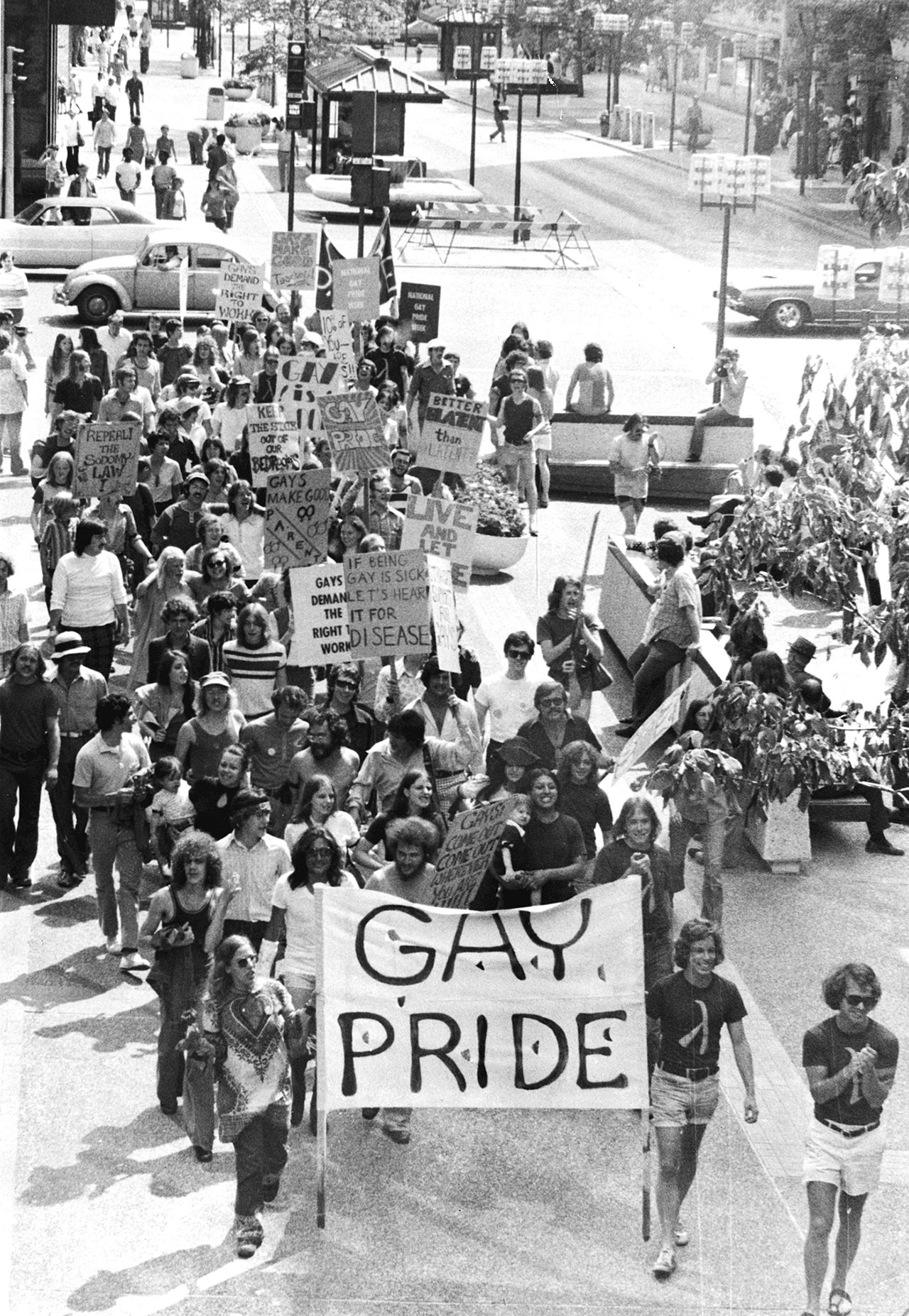
Photo by Jim Chalgren, June 1973. Courtesy: Jean-Nickolaus Tretter Collection in GLBT Studies, U of M Libraries, Minneapolis.

On May 18, 1970, two University of Minnesota gay student activists, Richard Baker and James Michael McConnell, applied for a marriage license in Minneapolis. The clerk of the Hennepin County District Court, Gerald Nelson, denied the request on the sole ground that the two were of the same sex. The couple filed suit in district court to force Nelson to issue the license. The couple first contended that Minnesota's marriage statutes contained no explicit requirement that applicants be of different sexes. If the court were to construe the statutes to require different-sex couples, however, Baker claimed such a reading would violate several provisions of the U.S. Constitution:

- First Amendment (freedom of speech and of association),
- Eighth Amendment (cruel and unusual punishment),
- Ninth Amendment (unenumerated right to privacy), and
- Fourteenth Amendment (fundamental right to marry under the Due Process Clause and sex discrimination contrary to the Equal Protection Clause).

The trial court dismissed the couple's claims and ordered the clerk not to issue the license. Eventually this case reached the Minnesota Supreme Court in Baker v. Nelson, 291 Minn. 310, 191 N.W.2d 185 (1971), in which the Minnesota Supreme Court ruled that a state law limiting marriage to persons of the opposite sex did not violate the U.S. Constitution. However, before that decision became final, McConnell applied again – in a different county – and received a marriage license.

The 1971 marriage of James Michael McConnell and Richard John "Jack" Baker meant they were the first legally married same-sex couple in United States history. Their marriage is also "the earliest same-gender marriage ever to be recorded in the public files of any civil government".

Baker later appealed the Minnesota Supreme Court ruling that a state law limiting marriage to persons of the opposite sex did not violate the U.S. Constitution, but on October 10, 1972, the United States Supreme Court dismissed the appeal "for want of a substantial federal question". Because the case came to the Supreme Court through mandatory appellate review (not certiorari), the dismissal constituted a decision on the merits and established Baker v. Nelson as precedent, though the extent of its precedential effect has been subject to debate. In May 2013, Minnesota legalized same-sex marriage and it took effect on August 1, 2013.

Historians argued, correctly, that the interpretation of "Marriages prohibited" by the Minnesota Supreme Court in Baker v. Nelson (1971) did not apply to McConnell and Baker because they obtained a license and were married six weeks before that Court's opinion became final.

=== 1970s: Gay men and religion ===
The Rev. William R. Johnson was an important gay religious figure in the 1970s. In 1972 the United Church of Christ ordained him at the Community United Church of Christ in San Carlos, California, making him the first openly gay person to be ordained as a minister in a mainline Protestant denomination. He founded the United Church of Christ Gay Caucus in 1972 (it is now the UCC Coalition for Lesbian, Gay, Bisexual & Transgender Concerns, aka "The Coalition"). He served as national coordinator for The Coalition from 1972 to 1977.

=== 1970s: Gay men and psychiatry ===
The American Psychiatric Association held an annual meeting in 1972 titled "Psychiatry: Friend or Foe to Homosexuals? A Dialogue". The panel included, among others, "Dr. H. Anonymous," a gay psychiatrist who appeared in disguise to conceal his identity. He was later revealed to be John E. Fryer. The outcome of that panel was that in 1973 the APA removed homosexuality from the Diagnostic and Statistical Manual of Mental Disorders.

=== 1970s: Violence against gay men ===
The UpStairs Lounge arson attack took place on June 24, 1973, at a gay bar located on the second floor of the three-story building at 141 Chartres Street in the French Quarter of New Orleans, Louisiana. Thirty-two people died as a result of fire or smoke inhalation. The official cause is still listed as "undetermined origin". The most likely suspect, a gay man who had been thrown out of the bar earlier in the day, was never charged. It was the deadliest arson attack in New Orleans and the deadliest attack on LGBT people in United States history. The reaction by the city and media following the attack was indifferent. Those seeking burial services for the dead were turned away by many churches, and several families refused to come forward to claim victims' bodies out of shame. While most news outlets ignored the story, mentions of the incident in editorials and talk radio made light of the tragedy, mocking the victims because of their sexual orientation.

=== 1970s: LGBT symbolism ===
A significant action of the gay rights movement in the 1970s was the creation of the Gay Pride flag by gay activist Gilbert Baker. Thirty volunteers had helped Baker hand-dye and stitch the first two flags for the parade. When Gilbert Baker raised the first Gay Pride flag at San Francisco Pride on June 25, 1978, it had eight colors, each with a symbolic meaning:

Hot pink	Sex
Red	Life
Orange	Healing
Yellow	Sunlight
Green	Nature
Turquoise	Magic/Art
Indigo	Serenity
Violet	Spirit

First appearing around 1971 in San Francisco, visual codes signifying availability and preferences during cruising activities also started to spread within the gay subculture in the 1970s, expanding on the existing handkerchief code by assigning meanings to more colors beyond the traditional red and blue. Further codes included keychains openly worn on a belt loop as well as earrings.

=== 1970s: Gay men and politics ===
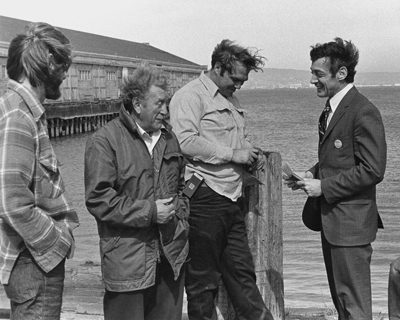
Harvey Milk campaigning with longshormen in 1976

In 1978 Harvey Milk became the first openly gay man elected to public office in the United States, and the first openly gay or lesbian person to be elected to public office in California, when he won a seat on the San Francisco Board of Supervisors. Milk served almost 11 months in office and was responsible for passing a stringent gay rights ordinance for the city. However, on November 27, 1978, Milk and Mayor George Moscone were assassinated by Dan White, a fellow city supervisor.

In 1979, Stephen Lachs became the first openly gay judge appointed in the United States. He is also thought but not proven to be the first openly gay judge appointed anywhere in the world. He served as a judge of the Los Angeles County Superior Court from 1979 to 1999.

John Ward founded Gay & Lesbian Advocates & Defenders (GLAD), now GLBTQ Legal Advocates & Defenders (GLAD Law), in 1978 and filed its first case, Doe v. McNiff, that same year. GLAD Law is a non-profit legal rights organization in the United States. The organization works to end discrimination based on sexual orientation, HIV status, and gender identity and expression. An early victory came in Fricke v. Lynch (1980), in which GLAD Law represented Aaron Fricke, an 18-year-old student at Cumberland High School in Rhode Island, who won the right to bring a same-sex date to a high school dance. GLAD Law is based in Boston, Massachusetts, and serves the New England area of the United States. Services it provides include litigation, advocacy, and educational work in all areas of LGBT (lesbian, gay, bisexual, transgender) civil rights and the rights of people living with HIV. The organization also operates a telephone hotline and website.

=== 1980s: AIDS crisis ===
AIDS Memorial Quilt, 1987

The 1980s were significant for the AIDS crisis, which hit the gay male community especially hard.

At first the disease was unidentified. In the early 1980s, reports began surfacing in San Francisco and New York City that a rare form of cancer called Kaposi's Sarcoma was affecting young gay men. In the general press, the term "GRID", which stood for gay-related immune deficiency, was used to refer to the disease. However, after determining that AIDS was not isolated to the gay community, it was realized that the term GRID was misleading and the term AIDS was introduced at a meeting in July 1982. By September 1982 the CDC started referring to the disease as AIDS. After the Centers for Disease Control declared the new disease an epidemic, Gay Men's Health Crisis was created in 1982 when 80 men gathered in New York gay activist Larry Kramer's apartment to discuss the issue and to raise money for research. The founders were Nathan Fain, Larry Kramer, Lawrence D. Mass, Paul Popham, Paul Rapoport and Edmund White. At the time, it was the largest volunteer AIDS organization in the world. Paul Popham was elected as the first president.

Randy Shilts, who later died of AIDS, was one of the foremost reporters of the AIDS epidemic. He was hired as a national correspondent by the San Francisco Chronicle in 1981, becoming the first openly gay reporter with a gay "beat" in the American mainstream press.

In 1985 Cleve Jones, a gay activist and Harvey Milk's former lover, conceived the idea of the AIDS Memorial Quilt at a candlelight memorial for Harvey Milk. In 1987 he created the first quilt panel in honor of his friend Marvin Feldman. The AIDS Memorial Quilt has grown to become the world's largest community arts project, memorializing the lives of over 85,000 Americans killed by AIDS.

Also in 1985, closeted gay actor Rock Hudson became the first major celebrity to die from an AIDS-related illness. He revealed he had AIDS shortly before his death, and his revelation had an immediate impact on visibility of AIDS, and on funding of medical research related to the disease. Shortly after his death, People reported: "Since Hudson made his announcement, more than $1.8 million in private contributions (more than double the amount collected in 1984) has been raised to support AIDS research and to care for AIDS victims (5,523 reported in 1985 alone). A few days after Hudson died, Congress set aside $221 million to develop a cure for AIDS." Organizers of the Hollywood AIDS benefit Commitment to Life reported after Hudson's announcement he was suffering from the disease, it was necessary to move the event to a larger venue to accommodate the increased attendance.

==== ACT UP ====
In 1987, Larry Kramer founded AIDS Coalition to Unleash Power (ACT UP), an international direct action advocacy group working to impact the lives of people with AIDS (PWAs) and the AIDS pandemic to bring about legislation, medical research and treatment and policies to ultimately bring an end to the disease by mitigating loss of health and lives. In March 1987, Larry Kramer was asked to speak at the Lesbian and Gay Community Services Center in New York City as part of a rotating speaker series, and his well-attended speech focused on action to fight AIDS. Kramer spoke out against the Gay Men's Health Crisis (GMHC). According to Douglas Crimp, Kramer also posed a question to the audience: "Do we want to start a new organization devoted to political action?" The answer was "a resounding yes". Approximately 300 people met two days later to form ACT UP.

In all, since its discovery in the early 1980s, AIDS has caused nearly 30 million deaths (as of 2009). As of 2010, approximately 34 million people have contracted HIV globally. AIDS is considered a pandemic—a disease outbreak which is present over a large area and is actively spreading.

=== 1980s: Gay men in the media ===
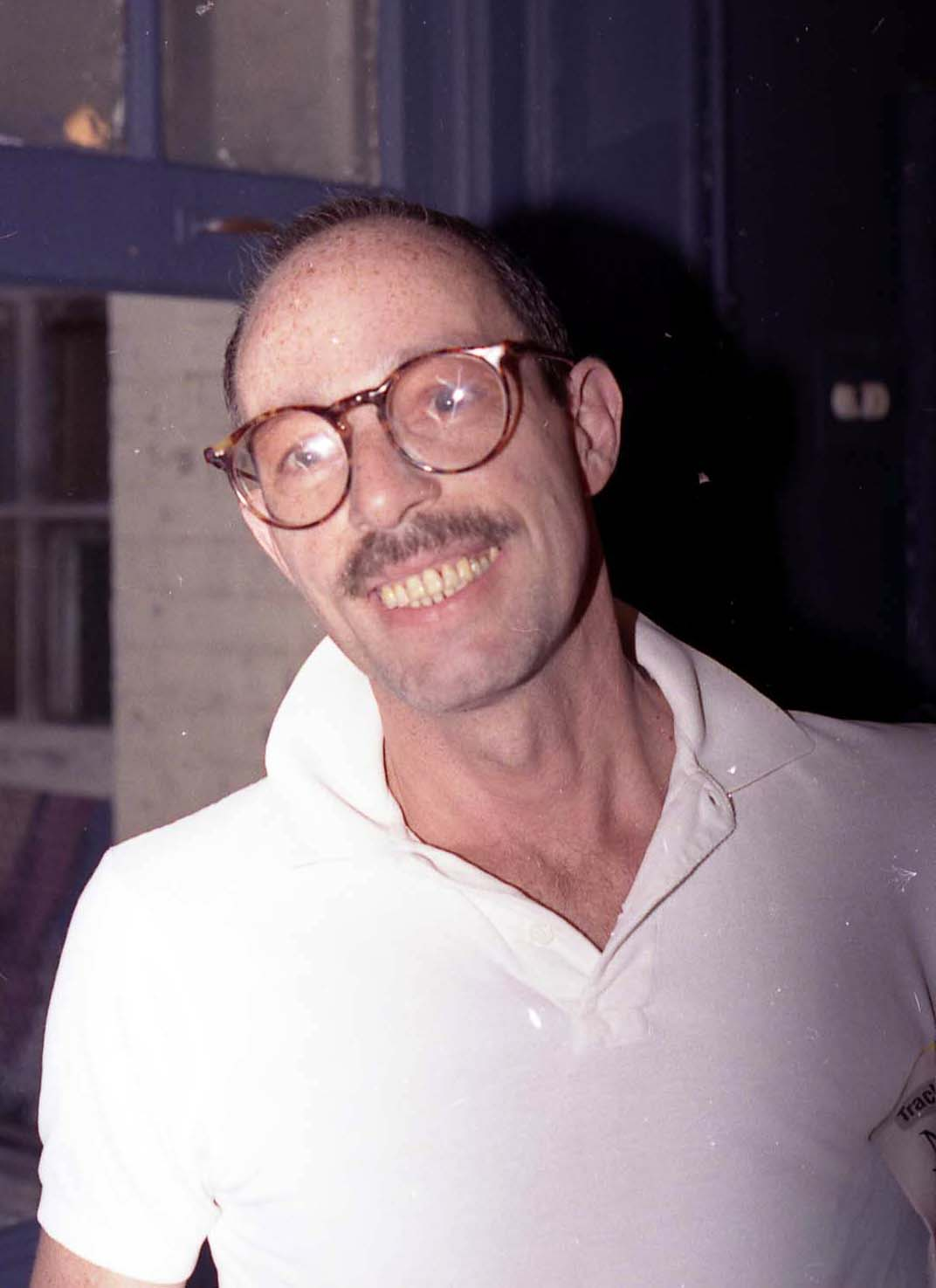
Vito Russo in 1989

GLAAD (formerly the Gay & Lesbian Alliance Against Defamation) is a U.S. non-governmental media monitoring organization which promotes the image of LGBT people in the media. Before March 2013, the name "GLAAD" had been an acronym for "Gay & Lesbian Alliance Against Defamation," but became the primary name due to its inclusiveness of bisexual and transgender issues. Its stated mission, in part, is to "[amplify] the voice of the LGBT community by empowering real people to share their stories, holding the media accountable for the words and images they present, and helping grassroots organizations communicate effectively". Formed in New York City in 1985 to protest against what it saw as the New York Post's defamatory and sensationalized AIDS coverage, GLAAD put pressure on media organizations to end what it saw as homophobic reporting. Initial meetings were held in the homes of several New York City activists as well as after-hours at the New York State Council on the Arts. The founding group included film scholar Vito Russo; Gregory Kolovakos, then on the staff of the NYS Arts Council and who later became the first executive director; Darryl Yates Rist; Allen Barnett; and Jewelle Gomez, the organization's first treasurer. Some members of GLAAD went on to become the early members of ACT UP. In 1987, after a meeting with GLAAD, The New York Times changed its editorial policy to use the word gay instead of harsher terms referring to homosexuality. GLAAD advocated that the Associated Press and other television and print news sources follow. GLAAD's influence soon spread to Los Angeles, where organizers began working with the entertainment industry to change the way LGBT people were portrayed on screen.

Entertainment Weekly has named GLAAD as one of Hollywood's most powerful entities, and the Los Angeles Times described GLAAD as "possibly one of the most successful organizations lobbying the media for inclusion".

=== 1980s: Gay men in politics and law ===
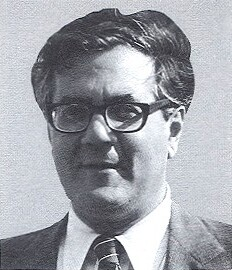
In 1987, Barney Frank became the second U.S. congressman to come out.

The 1980s were not all bleak. Openly gay men became more prominent in politics. The Socialist Party USA nominated an openly gay man, David McReynolds, as its (and America's) first openly gay presidential candidate in 1980. In 1983, Gerry Studds became the first openly gay member of the U.S. Congress. Studds was a central figure in the 1983 Congressional page sex scandal, when he and Representative Dan Crane were each separately censured by the House of Representatives for an inappropriate relationship with a congressional page — in Studds' case, a gay relationship with a teenage page. During the course of the House Ethics Committee's investigation, Studds publicly acknowledged his homosexuality, a disclosure that, according to a Washington Post article, "apparently was not news to many of his constituents". Studds stated in an address to the House, "It is not a simple task for any of us to meet adequately the obligations of either public or private life, let alone both, but these challenges are made substantially more complex when one is, as I am, both an elected public official and gay." He acknowledged that it had been inappropriate to engage in a relationship with a subordinate, and said his actions represented "a very serious error in judgment". He won reelection in 1984. In 1987 Barney Frank became the first U.S. congressman to come out as gay of his own volition. Frank started coming out as gay to friends before he ran for Congress and came out publicly on May 30, 1987, "prompted in part by increased media interest in his private life" and the death of Stewart McKinney, "a closeted bisexual Republican representative from Connecticut"; Frank told The Washington Post after McKinney's death there was "An unfortunate debate about 'Was he or wasn't he? Didn't he or did he?' I said to myself, I don't want that to happen to me."

An important legal victory came in 1989 with the case Braschi v. Stahl Associates Co. In this New York Court of Appeals case it was decided that the surviving partner of a same-sex relationship counted as "family" under New York law and was thus able to continue living in a rent controlled apartment belonging to the deceased partner. The New York Court of Appeals found that a "more realistic, and certainly equally valid, view of a family includes two adult lifetime partners whose relationship is long term and characterized by an emotional and financial commitment and interdependence". Application of this standard allowed Braschi to be considered a family member and prevented his eviction from the apartment. The decision was the first time a court in the United States granted any kind of legal recognition to a same-sex couple. The litigant in the case, Miguel Braschi, had been in a long-term relationship and lived with his partner Leslie Blanchard, who rented an apartment on East 54th Street in Manhattan. Blanchard had died of AIDS in 1986—Braschi had been a dutiful caregiver during his partner's illness and a loving partner of over ten years.

=== 1990s: Victories and political power ===
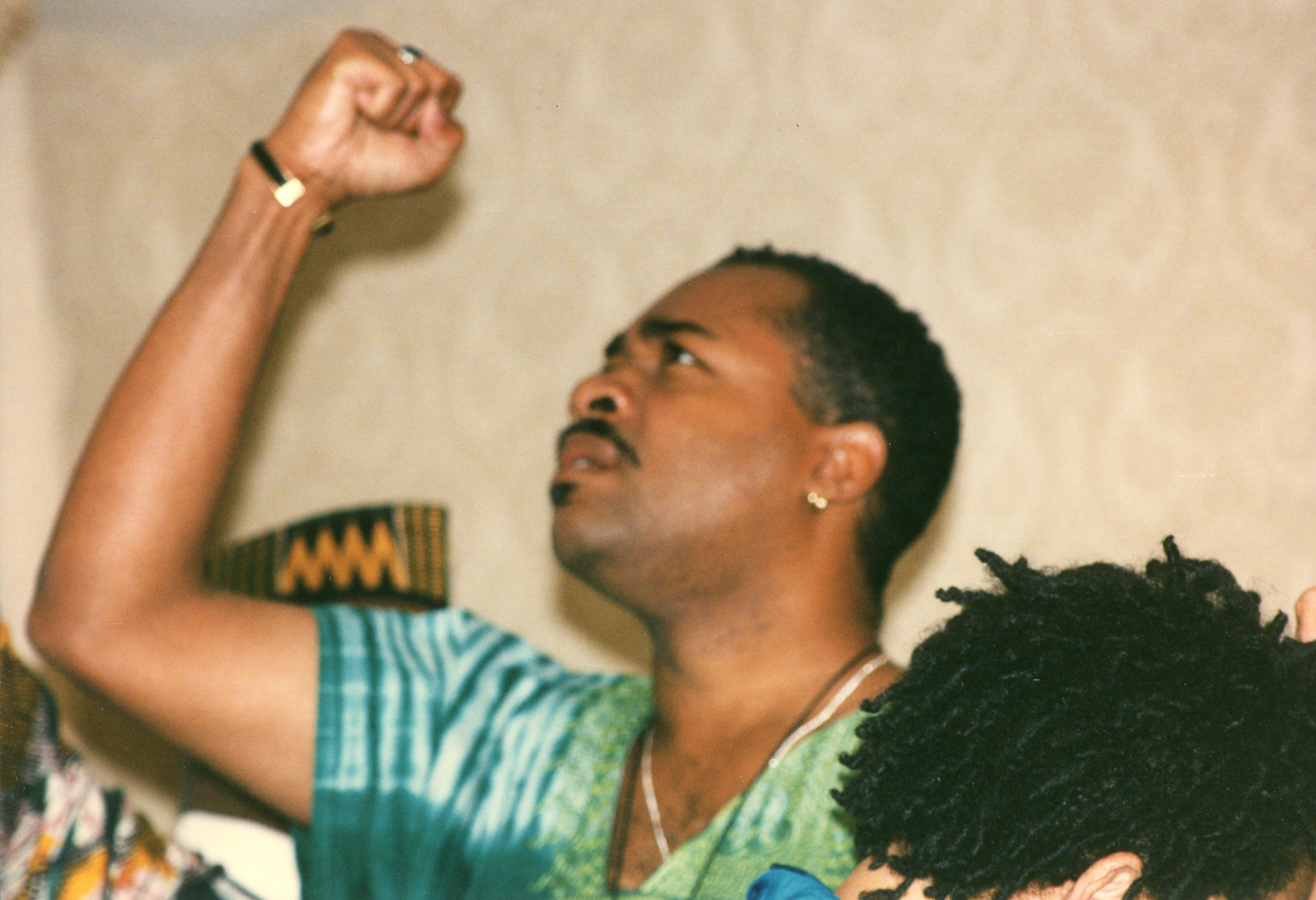
1996 DC Black Lesbian & Gay Pride Prayer Breakfast

On March 20, 1990, sixty LGBTQ people gathered at the Lesbian, Gay, Bisexual and Transgender Community Services Center in New York's Greenwich Village to create a direct action organization. The goal of the unnamed organization was the elimination of homophobia, and the increase of gay, lesbian and bisexual visibility through a variety of tactics. Group's breakthrough was at New York's Gay Pride parade when militant AIDS activists passed out to the assembled crowd an inflammatory manifesto, bearing the titles "I Hate Straights!" and "Queers Read This!" Within days, in response to the brash, "in-your-face" tone of the broadside, Queer Nation chapters had sprung up in San Francisco and other major cities. The name Queer Nation had been used casually since the group's inception, until it was officially approved at the group's general meeting on May 17, 1990.

There were several legal successes for gay men in the 1990s. Hawaii's denial of marriage licenses to same-sex couples was first challenged in state court in 1991 in Baehr v. Miike (originally Baehr v. Lewin) and the plaintiffs (a gay male couple, Patrick Lagon and Joseph Melillo, as well as two lesbian couples, Ninia Baehr and Genora Dancel, and Antoinette Pregil and Tammy Rodrigues) initially met with some success. But Hawaii voters modified the state constitution in 1998 to allow the legislature to restrict marriage to mixed-sex couples. By the time the Supreme Court of Hawaii considered the final appeal in the case in 1999, it upheld the state's ban on same-sex marriage, but same-sex marriage was legalized in Hawaii in 2013. In 1993 the "Don't Ask Don't Tell" policy was enacted, which mandated that the military could not ask servicemembers about their sexual orientation or go on "witch hunts" to find and expel homosexual service members. However, until the policy was ended in 2011 service members were still expelled from the military if they engaged in sexual conduct with a member of the same sex, stated that they were gay, and/or married or attempted to marry someone of the same sex. In 1994, fear of persecution due to sexual orientation became grounds for asylum in the United States. In 1996, in the case Nabozny v. Podlesny, the U.S. Seventh Circuit Court of Appeals ruled that school officials violated the rights of an openly gay teenager, Jamie Nabozny, when they allowed others to harass him for his sexual orientation. This was the first judicial opinion in American history finding that a public school could be held accountable for not stopping antigay abuse.

In 1999 domestic partnerships were legalized in California — the first state to do so, and therefore, the first state to legally recognize same-sex relationships.

There was also one prominent political success for gay men in the 1990s. In 1994, President Bill Clinton considered James Hormel for the ambassadorship to Fiji, but did not put the nomination forward due to protests from Fiji officials. Gay male sexual acts were punishable with prison sentences in Fiji and Hormel's being open about his sexuality would stand in conflict with culture. Instead Hormel was named as part of the United Nations delegation from the US to the Human Rights Commission in 1995, and in 1996 became an alternate for the United Nations General Assembly. In October 1997 Clinton nominated Hormel to be ambassador to Luxembourg, which had removed laws prohibiting consensual same-sex acts between adults in the 1800s. This appointment was the first nomination or appointment of an openly LGBT person from the US.

The International Bear Brotherhood Flag was created in 1995. There is debate over its creator, but Craig Byrnes claims to have created it. Bear is an affectionate gay slang term for those in the bear communities, a subculture in the gay male community with its own events, codes, and culture-specific identity.

== 2000–2020 ==
=== Same-sex marriage and other legal challenges ===
==== 2000 ====
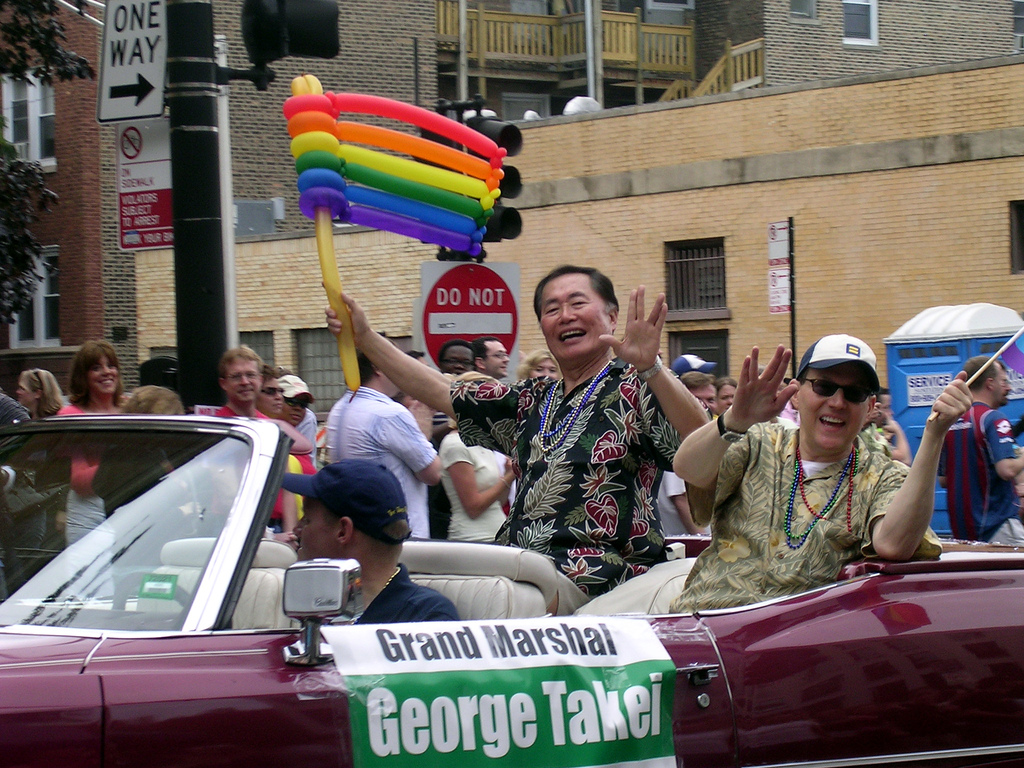
George Takei at the 2006 Chicago Pride Parade

Civil unions and same-sex marriages first became legally recognized in the United States in this decade. In 2000, Vermont became the first state to recognize civil unions. Several other states have legalized civil unions since.

==== 2002 ====
In 2002, a lawsuit brought by Derek R. Henkle against the Washoe County School District (Nevada) ended in a settlement in which the district agreed to implement policies to support openly gay and lesbian students and to pay the plaintiff, a student who had complained of harassment and inaction on the part of school officials, $451,000 in damages.

==== 2003 ====
Perhaps the most important court case ever for gay men was 2003's Lawrence vs Texas (539 U.S. 558). In this case, the U.S. Supreme Court struck down the sodomy law in Texas and, by extension, invalidated sodomy laws in thirteen other states, making same-sex sexual activity legal in every U.S. state and territory. The court thus overturned its previous ruling on the same issue in the 1986 case Bowers v. Hardwick, where it had upheld a challenged Georgia statute and did not find a constitutional protection of sexual privacy.

==== 2004-2009 ====
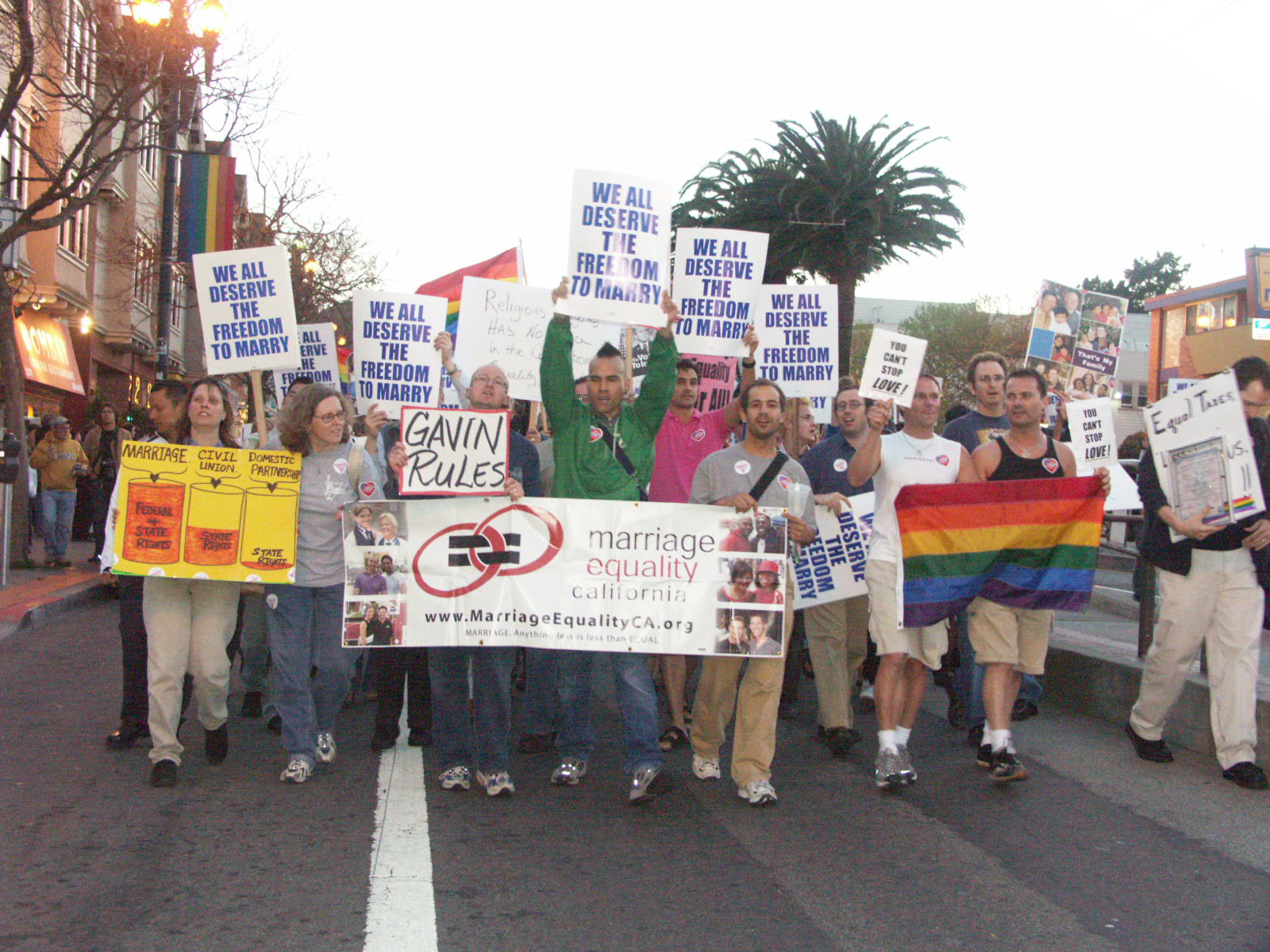
Rally in support of Gavin Newsom's decision to grant marriage licenses

In 2004 San Francisco mayor Gavin Newsom allowed city hall to grant marriage licenses to same-sex couples. However, all same-sex marriages done in 2004 in California were annulled. Later in 2008 Prop 8 illegalized same-sex marriage in California, but the marriages that occurred between the California Supreme Court decision legalizing same-sex marriage and the approval of Prop 8 illegalizing it are still considered valid. In 2004, same-sex marriage was legalized in the state of Massachusetts. In March 2004, same-sex marriage was legalized in part of Oregon, as after researching the issue and getting two legal opinions, the commissioners decided Oregon's Constitution would not allow them to discriminate against same-sex couples. The chairwoman of the Board of Commissioners ordered the clerk to begin issuing marriage licenses. However, later that year, Oregon voters passed a constitutional amendment defining marriage as involving one man and one woman. The same-sex marriages from 2004 were ruled void by the Oregon Supreme Court. Same-sex marriage was legalized in Connecticut in 2008. Same-sex marriage was legalized in Iowa in 2009, and was legalized in Vermont in 2009. In 2008 the Coquille Tribe legalized same-sex marriage, with the law going into effect in May 2009. Another important victory for gay men came when in 2009, due to the Matthew Shepard and James Byrd, Jr. Hate Crimes Prevention Act being signed into law, the definition of federal hate crime was expanded to include those violent crimes in which the victim is selected due to their sexual orientation; previously federal hate crimes were defined as only those violent crimes where the victim is selected due to their race, color, religion, or national origin.

==== 2010-2012 ====
In 2010, same-sex marriage was legalized in the District of Columbia. That year same-sex marriage was also legalized in New Hampshire. In 2011, same-sex marriage was legalized in New York state, and by the Suquamish tribe of Washington. In 2011 the Don't Ask Don't Tell policy was ended, allowing gay men, bisexuals, and lesbians in the U.S. military to be open about their sexuality. In 2012, Maine, Maryland, and Washington became the first states to pass same-sex marriage by popular vote.

==== 2013 ====
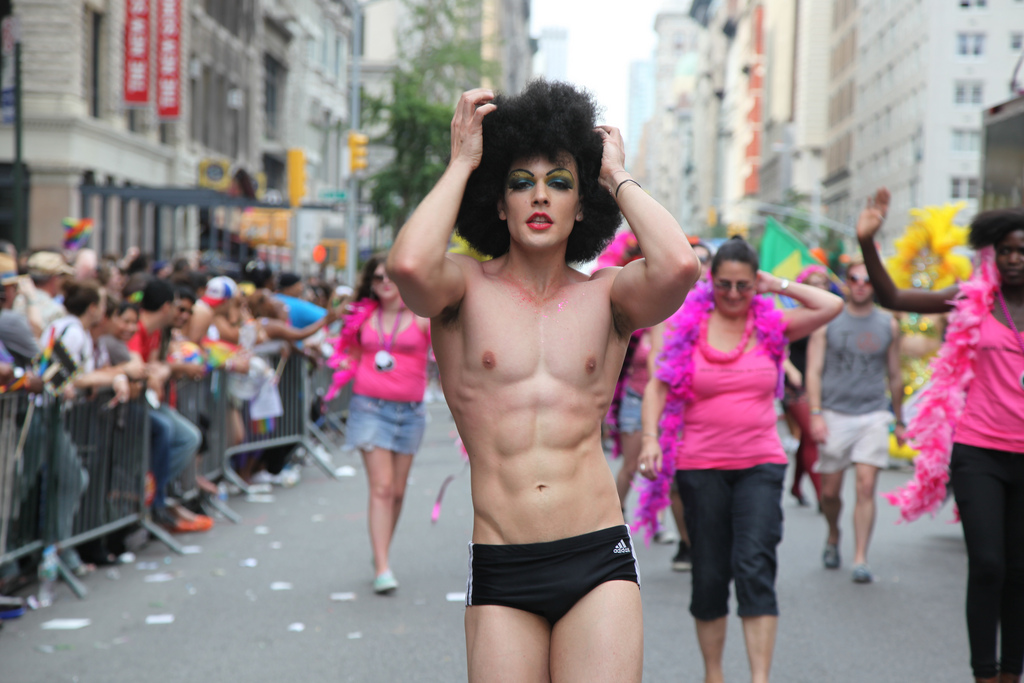
New York City Gay Pride by Alexander Kargaltsev

In 2013, the Little Traverse Bay Bands of Odawa Indians legalized same-sex marriage, and tribal citizen Tim LaCroix, 53, wed partner Gene Barfield, 60, in the tribe's first same-sex marriage ceremony. It was also the first same sex marriage legally performed in the State of Michigan, despite Michigan's constitutional prohibition, and held legal standing because of the federally recognized status of the Tribe, which is sovereign on its own lands within the state. Their marriage was the first same sex marriage performed between two men in Indian Country within the United States, other tribes having conducted same sex marriages between three female couples previously. Also in 2013, same-sex marriage was legalized by the Confederated Tribes of the Colville Reservation in the state of Washington, the Pokagon Band of Potawatomi Indians (whose first same-sex marriage certificate went to a male couple), and the Santa Ysabel Tribe.

Also in 2013, same-sex marriage was legalized in Hawaii, Illinois, Minnesota, New Jersey, New Mexico, Rhode Island, and Utah, and same-sex couples who had a partner facing a terminal illness were allowed to get married in Illinois starting in 2013 rather than waiting until June 2014 implementation date. Jonipher Kwong and his partner Chris Nelson were the first same-sex couple to marry in Hawaii. However, several weeks after same-sex marriage was legalized in Utah a stay stopped it. Also in 2013, in the case United States v. Windsor, the Supreme Court struck down Section 3 of the federal Defense of Marriage Act (DOMA), which had denied federal benefits to same-sex couples who were legally married in their states. Also in 2013, in the case Hollingsworth v. Perry, which was brought by a lesbian couple (Kristin Perry and Sandra Stier) and a gay male couple (Katami and Jeffrey Zarrillo), the Supreme Court said the private sponsors of Proposition 8 did not have legal standing to appeal after the ballot measure was struck down by a federal judge in San Francisco, which made same-sex marriage legal again in California.

==== 2014 ====
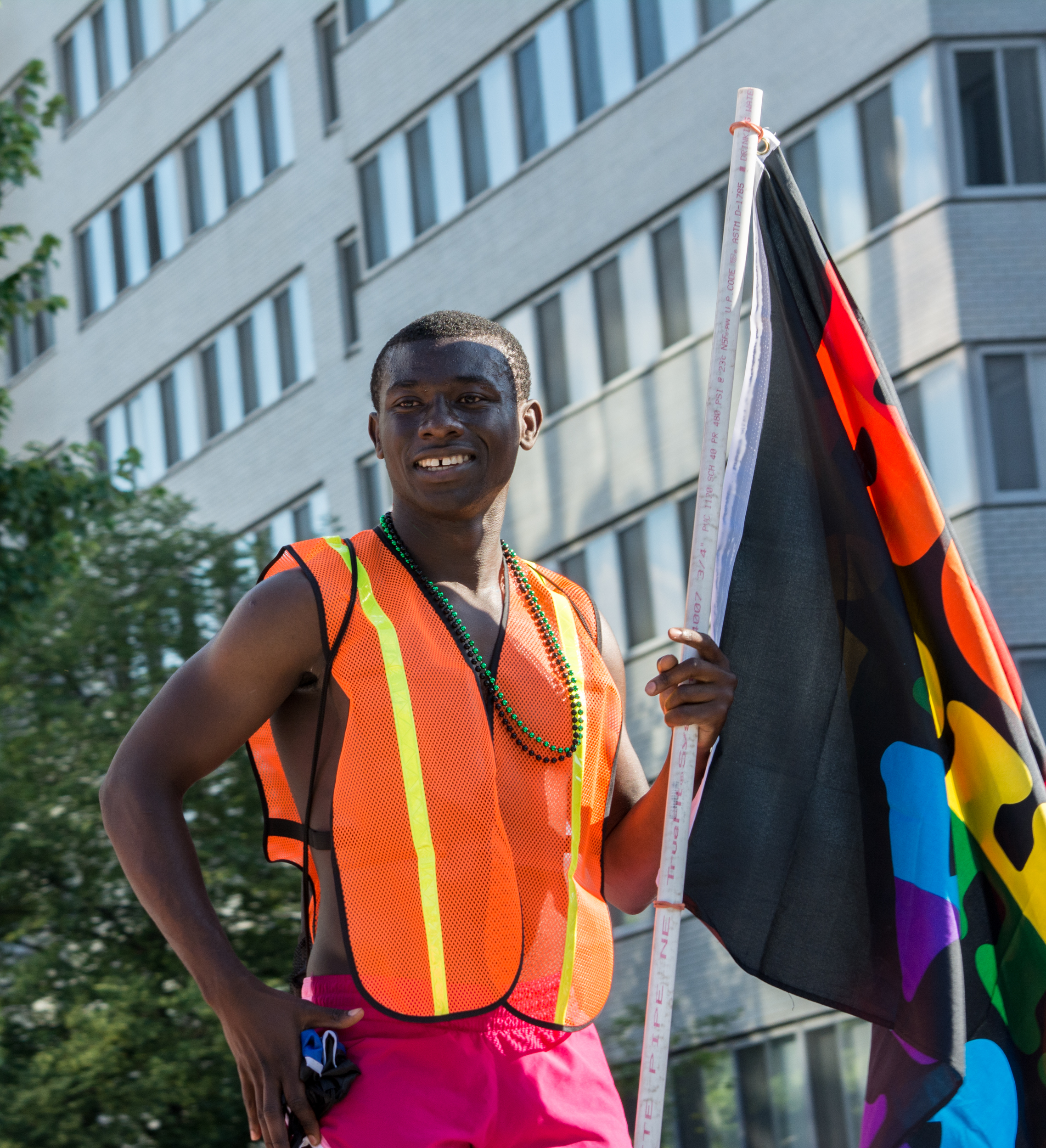
DC Capital Pride, 2014

In January 2014, same-sex marriage was legalized in Oklahoma, but the ruling was stayed; in 2014, a U.S. appeals court in Denver upheld the lower court ruling that struck down Oklahoma's gay-marriage ban, but that was also stayed. In March 2014, same-sex marriage was legalized in Michigan; however, later that year the overturning of Michigan's ban on same-sex marriage was indefinitely stayed. In May 2014 same-sex marriage was legalized in Arkansas; however, later that year the Arkansas Supreme Court suspended same-sex marriages. Also in May 2014, same-sex marriage was legalized in Oregon, Pennsylvania, and Wisconsin, but later that year same-sex marriages in Wisconsin were put on hold while the ruling striking down the state's ban on such unions was appealed. That same month, Idaho's same-sex marriage ban was declared unconstitutional, but another court stayed the ruling. Also in 2014, same-sex marriage was legalized in Kentucky, but that ruling was put on hold and so no same-sex marriages were performed at that time. Indiana performed same-sex marriages for three days in 2014, but then the ruling legalizing same-sex marriage in Indiana was likewise put on hold. Similarly, a federal appeals court based in Denver found that states cannot ban gay marriage, but that ruling was put on hold pending an appeal; however, clerk Boulder county clerk Hillary Hall (the first clerk to do so) and clerks in Denver and Pueblo counties issued marriage licenses to same-sex couples in Colorado in spite of the hold.

Later that year, same-sex marriage was legalized in Colorado, but the ruling was stayed. Colorado's Supreme Court ordered the Denver county clerk to stop issuing marriage licenses to gay couples while the state's ban against the unions was in place. While that decision did not include Boulder and Pueblo, Pueblo county agreed to stop issuing licenses at the request of the Attorney General's office, but Boulder's clerk did not. Later that year a federal judge in Denver ruled Colorado's ban on same-sex marriage was unconstitutional, but the ruling was stayed. Later that year the Colorado Supreme Court ordered Boulder County clerk Hillary Hall to stop issuing same-sex marriage licenses. Also in 2014, Monroe County, Florida legalized same-sex marriages, but the ruling was stayed. Later that year Miami-Dade Circuit Judge Sarah Zabel legalized same-sex marriage in Florida, but the ruling was stayed. Shortly afterward, two more judges legalized same-sex marriage in Florida, but their rulings were stayed. Toward the end of July 2014, the Fourth Circuit Court of Appeals (covering Maryland, Virginia, and the Carolinas) ruled against Virginia's same-sex marriage ban, but the ruling was stayed. However, in August 2014 a state court in Kingston, Tennessee, became the first to uphold a state ban on gay marriage since the Supreme Court's decision in 2013 in United States v. Windsor. Also, in September 2014 a federal judge upheld Louisiana's ban on same-sex marriages, which was the first such loss for LGBT rights in federal court since the Supreme Court's decision in 2013 in United States v. Windsor. But slightly later the 7th Circuit Court of Appeals legalized same-sex marriage in Indiana and Wisconsin, although the decision did not take effect then. Also, Louisiana legalized same-sex marriage in September 2014, but the ruling did not take effect then. In October 2014, the Supreme Court declined to hear the seven cases regarding same-sex marriage in Indiana, Oklahoma, Utah, Virginia, and Wisconsin, which meant lower court decisions ruling in favor of same-sex marriage stood, and therefore same-sex marriage then became legal in those states.

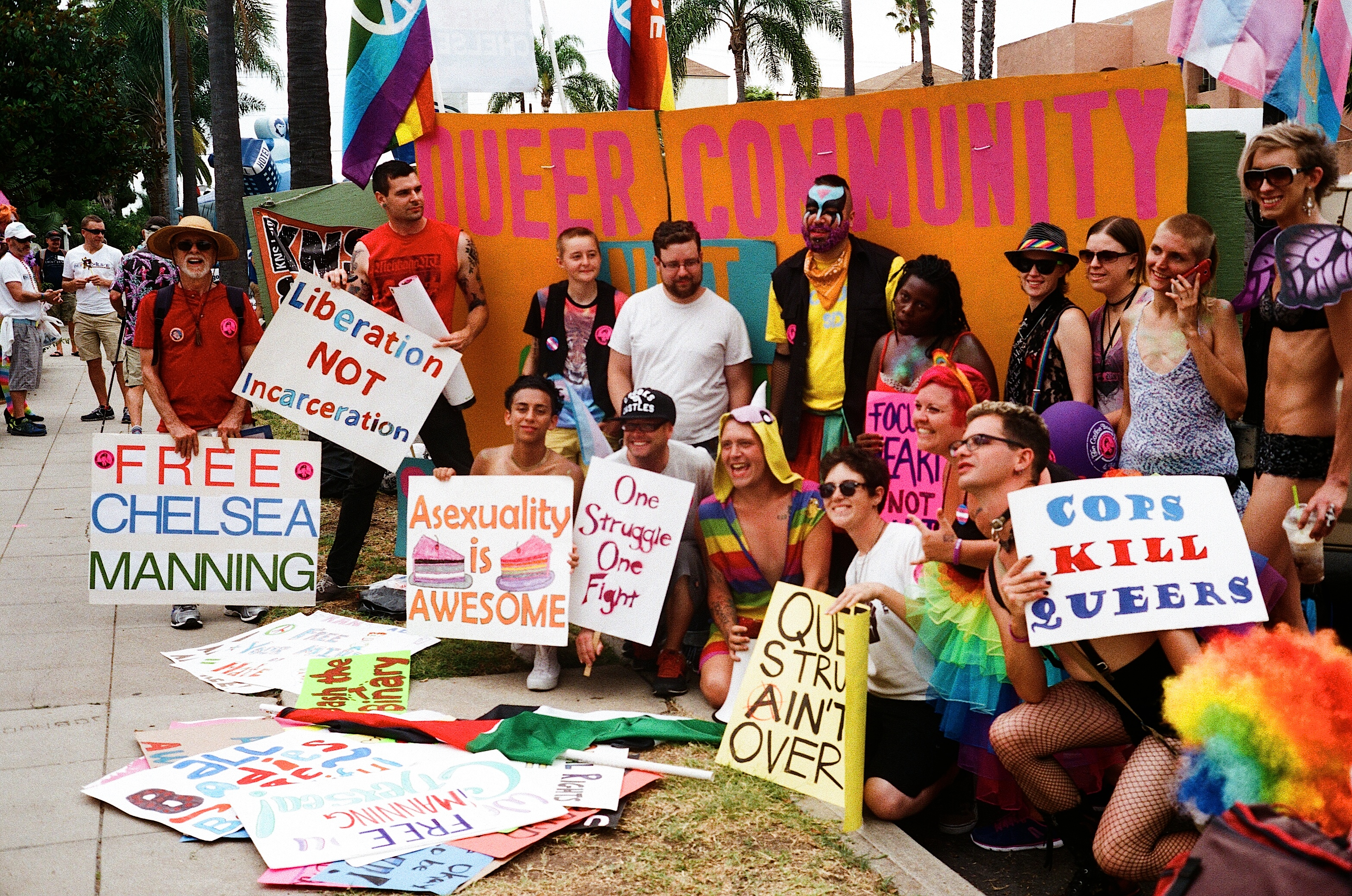
San Diego Pride 2014

Shortly later that month, the 9th Circuit Court of Appeals in San Francisco declared same-sex marriage legal in Idaho and Nevada, but Supreme Court Justice Anthony Kennedy temporarily blocked that ruling for Idaho. Shortly later a private group that had led the legal fight to defend the voter-approved ban on same-sex marriage withdrew its pending appeal for a stay with the Supreme Court, and thus same-sex marriage became legal in Nevada. Nevada state Sen. Kelvin Atkinson and Sherwood Howard were the first same-sex couple to marry in Nevada. Also in October 2014, a federal judge legalized same-sex marriage in North Carolina; although his federal judicial district only covers the western third of the state, North Carolina Attorney General Roy Cooper said that the federal ruling applied statewide. Also that month Attorney General Patrick Morrisey announced he would no longer fight a challenge to West Virginia's same-sex marriage ban, and thus same-sex marriage was legalized in West Virginia. Same-sex marriage was also legalized in Alaska, Arizona, Colorado, Idaho, and Wyoming that month. In November 2014, same-sex marriage was legalized in Kansas, but Supreme Court Justice Sonia Sotomayor issued an order temporarily blocking it. The order was lifted later that month; although Kansas Attorney General Derek Schmidt said that a separate lawsuit he filed with the state Supreme Court should prevent gay marriage in all but the two counties that were home to cases covered in the ruling from the nation's capital (Douglas and Sedgwick counties) couples beyond Douglas and Sedgwick counties picked up marriage licenses also. Later in November 2014 the Kansas Supreme Court ruled that Johnson County could issue marriage licenses to same-sex couples and left it to the federal courts to determine whether a Kansas ban on same-sex marriage violated the U.S. Constitution. Derek Schmidt then asked the 10th Circuit Court of Appeals for an en banc hearing on the Kansas same-sex marriage ban, but the 10th Circuit refused. Also in November 2014, same-sex marriage was legalized in Montana and South Carolina, although the ruling in South Carolina was stayed until later that month. That same month, same-sex marriage was legalized in Arkansas and Mississippi, but the rulings were stayed. Also in November 2014, St. Louis Circuit Judge Rex Burlison ruled that Missourians in same sex relationships have the right to marry, and St. Louis County began complying with that ruling, as shortly after Jackson County also did. But the judge who issued the ruling striking down Missouri's same-sex marriage ban stayed its order directing Jackson County to issue licenses to same-sex couples. Also in November 2014, the Sixth Circuit Court of Appeals upheld bans on same-sex marriage in Kentucky, Ohio, Tennessee, and Michigan, marking the first time since the Supreme Court's rulings in Windsor v. U.S. and Hollingsworth v. Perry (both of which were in favor of same-sex marriage) that any federal appeals court upheld a state's voter-approved ban on same-sex marriage.

Also, in 2014, President Obama signed Executive Order 13672, adding both "sexual orientation" and "gender identity" to the categories protected against discrimination in employment and hiring on the part of federal government contractors and sub-contractors.

==== 2015 ====
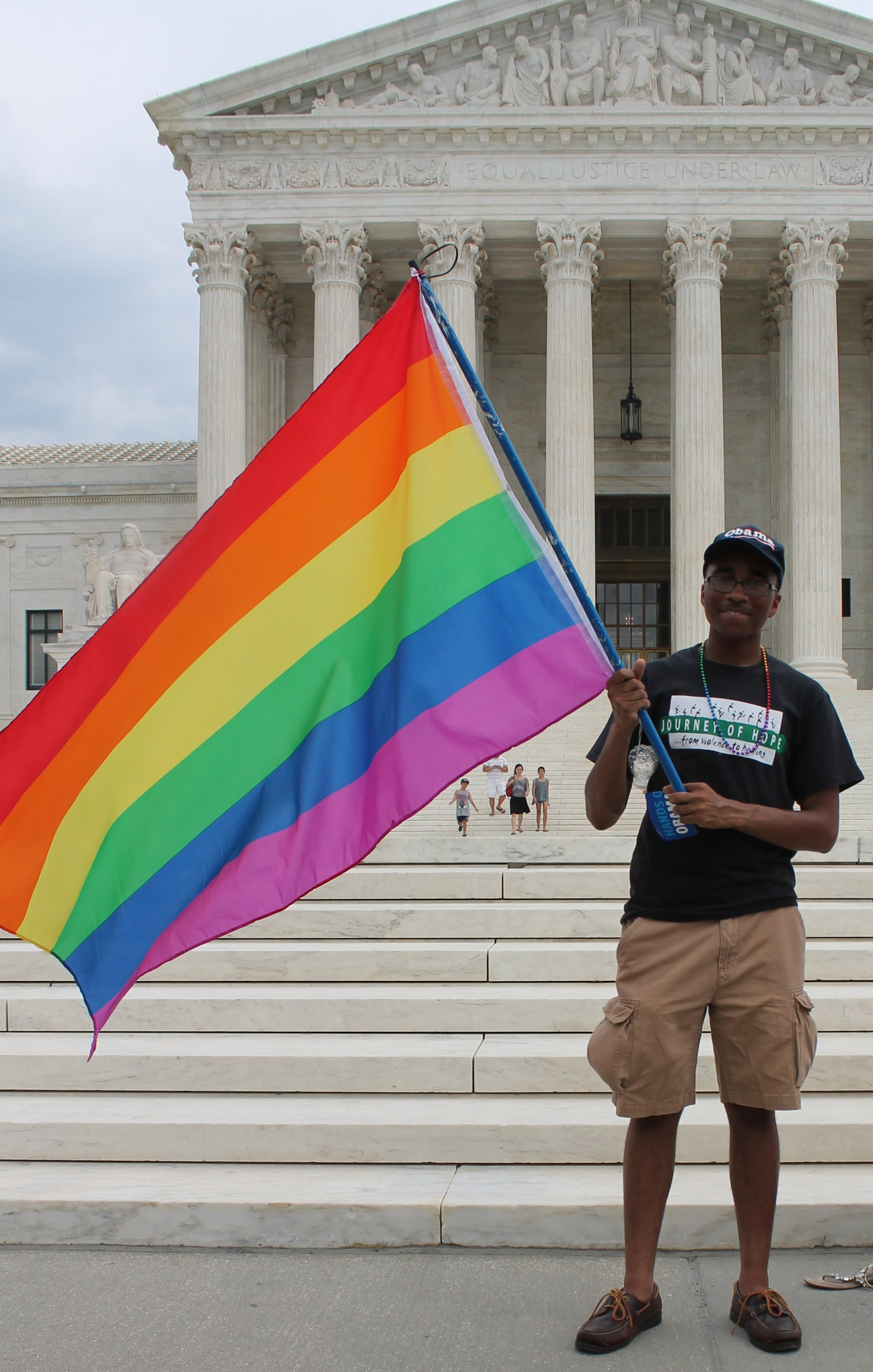
Man with flag at a Washington, DC Rally for "Marriage Equality," June, 2015

In January 2015, U.S. District Judge Robert Hinkle in Tallahassee ruled that all clerks in the state were required under the Constitution to issue marriage licenses to all same-sex couples. On January 5, 2015, same-sex marriage was legalized in Miami-Dade County when Judge Sarah Zabel lifted the legal stay on her July decision legalizing same-sex marriage in Florida. On January 6, 2015, same-sex marriage was legalized and began throughout Florida. Also in January 2015, same-sex marriage was legalized in South Dakota, but the ruling was stayed. Also that month, same-sex marriage was legalized in two separate rulings in Alabama, but both rulings were stayed. However, in February 2015 same-sex marriage was legalized in Alabama after the Supreme Court refused Alabama's attorney general's request to keep same-sex marriages on hold until the Supreme Court ruled whether laws banning them are constitutional. But the chief justice of the Alabama Supreme Court, Roy Moore, wrote in his own order later that the latest ruling legalizing same-sex marriage in Alabama did not apply to the state's probate judges and directed them not to comply. The judge who issued that latest ruling (Judge Callie V. S. Granade) then ruled that the local probate judge (Judge Don Davis of Mobile County) could not refuse to issue marriage licenses to same-sex couples, after which Davis began issuing licenses to same-sex couples, as did many counties in Alabama. In February 2015, a Texas probate judge ruled Tuesday that the state's ban on same-sex marriage was unconstitutional, as part of an estate battle. Later that month Sarah Goodfriend and Suzanne Bryant became the first same-sex couple married in Texas, after their marriage license was issued in response to a district judge's order in Travis County because one of the women had been diagnosed with ovarian cancer. However, the clerk's office noted that "[a]ny additional licenses issued to same sex couples also must be court ordered," and the Texas Supreme Court issued an emergency stay that same afternoon they were married.

Also in February 2015, the Central Council of Tlingit and Haida Indian Tribes of Alaska announced its courts were authorized to allow the performance of same-sex marriages. In March 2015, same-sex marriage was legalized in Nebraska, but that was stayed until the next Monday to give state officials time to appeal the ruling and ask for an extension of the stay, and then the Eighth Circuit granted the state's request, which placed same-sex marriage in Nebraska on hold until the federal appeals court ruled on Nebraska's marriage ban. Also in March 2015, the Alabama supreme court ordered Alabama's probate judges to stop issuing marriage licenses to same-sex couples, stating that a previous federal ruling that same-sex marriage bans violate the US constitution did not preclude them from following state law, which defined marriage as between a man and a woman. In April 2015 Guam's attorney general directed officials to begin processing marriage license applications from same-sex couples, but the governor said he wanted to study the issue further, and the public health director said he wouldn't accept the applications. In May 2015, a federal judge ruled that same-sex marriage was legal in all Alabama counties, but placed her decision on hold until the Supreme Court issued a ruling on same-sex marriage. On June 5, 2015, a judge issued a ruling which struck down Guam's statutory ban on same-sex marriage. The ruling was issued immediately after the court hearing proceedings and went into effect on 8 am Tuesday June 9. Same-sex marriages became performable and recognized in the U.S. territory from that date. Attorneys representing the government of Guam had said in a May 18 court filing that "should a court strike current Guam law, they would respect and follow such a decision".

Another important victory came in 2015, when the U.S. Equal Employment Opportunity Commission concluded that Title VII of the 1964 Civil Rights Act does not allow sexual orientation discrimination in employment because it is a form of sex discrimination.

===== Obergefell v. Hodges =====
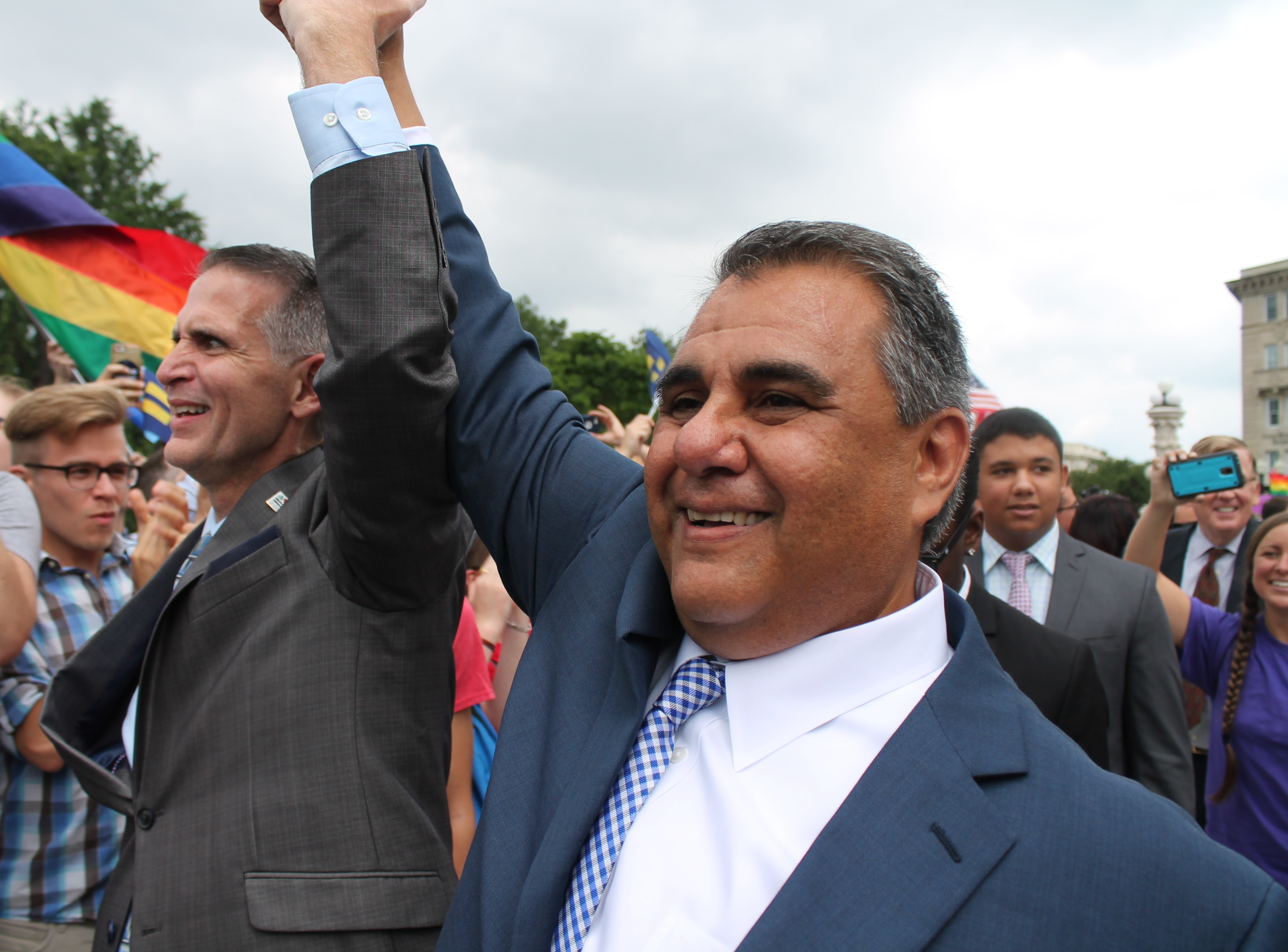
Rally celebrating Supreme Court decision to legalize gay marriage in the USA

Finally, on June 26, 2015, the Supreme Court ruled by a 5-to-4 vote in Obergefell v. Hodges that the Constitution guarantees a right to same-sex marriage, legalizing it throughout the United States. The case began when a male same-sex couple from Cincinnati, Ohio, filed a lawsuit, Obergefell v. Kasich (the named defendant was John Kasich, the 69th governor of Ohio), in the U.S. Southern District of Ohio on July 19, 2013, alleging that the state discriminates against same-sex couples who have married lawfully out-of-state. Because one partner, John Arthur, was terminally ill and suffering from amyotrophic lateral sclerosis (ALS), they wanted the Ohio Registrar to identify the other partner, James Obergefell (/ˈoʊbərɡəfɛl/), as his surviving spouse on his death certificate based on their marriage in Maryland on July 11, 2013. The local Ohio Registrar agreed that discriminating against the same-sex married couple is unconstitutional, but the state Attorney General's office announced plans to defend Ohio's same-sex marriage ban.

==== 2017 ====
In 2017, the Supreme Court ruled in Pavan v. Smith that in regard to the issuing of birth certificates, no state can treat same-sex couples differently than heterosexual ones. In 2017, the Department of Justice filed an amicus brief in the 2nd U.S. Circuit Court of Appeals making the argument that Title VII of the Civil Rights Act of 1964 does not prohibit discrimination against employees who are gay or bisexual.

=== Orlando shooting ===
On June 11, 2016, Pulse, a gay nightclub in Orlando, Florida, was hosting Latin Night, a weekly Saturday-night event drawing a primarily Hispanic crowd. In what was the deadliest mass shooting and the worst terror attack since 9/11 to occur in the United States, a mass shooting then occurred which killed 50 people, including the shooter, and injured 53. ISIL's Amaq News Agency claimed that the assault, "... was carried out by an Islamic State fighter". The FBI identified the deceased gunman as Omar Mir Seddique Mateen, a 29-year-old American citizen born in New York City to Afghani parents, and living in Port St. Lucie, Florida. Mateen called 9-1-1 during the attack and pledged allegiance to ISIL.

== 2020s ==
Pete Buttigieg's run for the 2020 Democratic presidential nomination made him America's first openly gay Democratic presidential candidate.

Bostock v. Clayton County, 590 U.S. ___ (2020), was a landmark Supreme Court case in which the Court ruled (on June 15, 2020) that Title VII of the Civil Rights Act of 1964 protects employees against discrimination because of their sexual orientation or gender identity. Two openly gay men, Gerald Bostock and Donald Zarda, were plaintiffs in the case.

In 2020 Richard Grenell became the Acting Director of National Intelligence, making him the first openly gay person to serve at a Cabinet level in the United States. In 2021 Pete Buttigieg became the Secretary of Transportation, making him the first openly gay non-acting member of the Cabinet of the United States, and the first openly gay person confirmed by the Senate to a Cabinet position.

In 2022, to prevent the loss of the right to same-sex marriage, the United States House of Representatives passed the Respect for Marriage Act which would nullify DOMA and protect both same-sex and interracial marriages. In July 2022, the bill passed 267–157, with 47 Republican representatives joining the Democrats. In December 2022, the United States Senate passed the bill 61–36, and the House again voted 258–169 to pass it.

In 2026 Chris Pappas was elected as a senator of New Hampshire, making him the first openly gay male senator in the United States.

== Historiography ==
Scholars of gay men in United States history

- Allan Bérubé
- Michael Bronski
- George Chauncey
- Julio Capó Jr.
- John D'Emilio
- Martin Duberman
- David K. Johnson
- Jonathan Ned Katz
- Regina Kunzel
- Marc Stein
- Timothy Stewart-Winter

See also:

- Allen Irvin Bernstein, author of the unpublished 1940 work Millions of Queers (Our Homo America), called by Jonathan Ned Katz "a rich document of homosexual American history."

== See also ==
- Bisexuality in the United States
- History of lesbianism in the United States
- History of transgender people in the United States
- LGBT history
- LGBT History Month
- LGBT history in the United States
