= Miguel Braschi and Leslie Blanchard =

First court-recognized same-sex couple in the USA

Miguel Braschi
- Born: October 8, 1956; San Juan, Puerto Rico
- Died: 1990 (aged 33–34); San Juan, Puerto Rico
- Cause of death: Complications from AIDS
- Education: Ohio State University
- Known for: Role in Braschi v. Stahl Associates Co.
- Partner: Leslie Blanchard

Leslie Blanchard
- Born: June 3, 1934
- Died: September 14, 1986 (aged 52)
- Cause of death: Complications from AIDS
- Known for: Role in Braschi v. Stahl Associates Co.
- Partner: Miguel Braschi

Miguel Braschi (October 8, 1956 – d. 1990) and his life partner Leslie Blanchard (June 3, 1934 – September 14, 1986) were an American gay couple who were the central figures in the landmark New York Court of Appeals case Braschi v. Stahl Associates Co. (1989). The victory served as the first court recognition of a same-sex couple as a family in the United States, and thus, as a significant milestone in the history of gay men in the United States.

== Early life and careers ==
=== Leslie Blanchard ===
Leslie Dean Blanchard graduated from Spaulding High School in 1952 and was a graduate of the Wilfred Academy in Boston. By the mid-1950s, Blanchard had moved to New York City. In the early 1960s, he was the color director for the Antoine Salon, later called the "Leslie Blanchard Color Studio" at the Saks Fifth Avenue flagship store.

Blanchard continued to work as a prominent hairdresser and hair colorist and later owned a salon called "The Private World of Leslie Blanchard" at 19 East 62nd Street in Manhattan. His salon catered to celebrities and public figures, and he was considered a celebrity hair colorist and stylist by the late 1960s. In the same period, Blanchard was a featured celebrity spokesmodel featured in ads for Clairol hair care products, serving as their national "chief color consultant." By the 1980s, Blanchard also sold a line of hair care and coloring products.

In 1982, Doubleday published a book by Blanchard and co-author Zack Hanle titled "Leslie Blanchard's Hair-Coloring Book." In 1987, Blanchard's second book was published by Dutton, titled, "Leslie Blanchard's Foolproof Guide to Beautiful Hair Color." In the tributes in his 1987 book, he was described by actress Alexis Smith as "magical with color" and by Joan Fontaine as "an artist and a talented technician" with "superb taste."

=== Miguel Braschi ===
Miguel Braschi was born to an upper-class family on October 8, 1956, in San Juan, Puerto Rico. His mother was Edmee Braschi and his father Euripides ("Pilo") Braschi was a tennis champion. Braschi also played tennis and was accepted to Ohio State University on a tennis scholarship, where he attended through the end of his junior year.

=== Life together ===
Braschi and Blanchard met at a gay bar in December 1975 when Braschi was back home in Puerto Rico visiting family, and when Blanchard was visiting the island on vacation.

In 1976, Braschi and Blanchard moved together into a rent-controlled Sutton Place, Manhattan apartment located at 405 East 54th Street. During their life together, they considered each other as life partners and referred to each other as "married" and "spouses." In 1977, the couple gave each other matching Cartier bracelets as a symbol of their commitment to one another. Blanchard also named Braschi as the manager of his salon business.

== Court case ==
After Blanchard's death due to complications related to AIDS in 1986, Braschi began receiving letters from their building owner, Stahl Associates, ordering him to vacate their 54th Street apartment because his name was not listed on the lease, and because, as a gay partner, he was not legally recognized as a member of Blanchard's family. Under Section 2204.6(d) of New York state's Rent and Eviction Regulations, eviction of a "surviving spouse or family members" was prohibited, but such protections did not apply to Braschi at that time. Braschi decided to file a lawsuit to fight the eviction, known as Braschi v. Stahl Associates Co, where he argued that the legal protections should apply to his relationship with his deceased partner. Braschi was represented by William Rubenstein of the American Civil Liberties Union.

Braschi was allowed to stay in the apartment while the case was in court. After Braschi appealed the rulings of the lower courts and after a multi-year period, the New York Court of Appeals found in his favor by a ruling of 4–2 on July 6, 1989. In its ruling, the court stated that a "more realistic, and certainly equally valid, view of a family includes two adult lifetime partners whose relationship is long term and characterized by an emotional and financial commitment and interdependence." The decision represented the first time a court in the United States granted any kind of legal recognition to a same-sex couple.

=== Aftermath ===
Braschi's victory recognized that non-traditional families had a right to succeed rent-controlled apartments and a right to protection from arbitrary eviction. This protection was later extended to all rent-regulated apartments. The recognition of Braschi and Blanchard as a family influenced later LGBT rights legal cases in New York and elsewhere in the United States. Legal scholar Carlos A. Ball, in his 2010 legal history text, From the Closet to the Courtroom, devoted an entire chapter to the case, highlighting its importance in LGBT history in the United States.

== Deaths ==
Blanchard died in 1986 due to complications related to AIDS. Braschi had been a dutiful caregiver during Blanchard's illness. Braschi died in 1990 in San Juan due to complications related to AIDS.

== Legacy ==
- In September 1989, two months after the victory in the Braschi v. Stahl Associates Co. case, Braschi was interviewed by Peter Jennings in a national news program for PBS. The interview has been archived through The Rainbow History Project.
- The NYC LGBT Historic Sites Project includes the "Miguel Braschi & Leslie Blanchard Residence" as a site of cultural and historical significance to the LGBT+ community in New York City.
- The 2017 exhibition AIDS at Home: Art and Everyday Activism, presented at the Museum of the City of New York explored how HIV/AIDS played out in the everyday lives of diverse communities in New York. The section on "Family" featured legal documents and photos related to the 1986 legal case of Miguel Braschi.
- In 2019, the LGBTQ Commission of the New York Courts commemorated the 30th anniversary of the New York Court of Appeals' decision in Braschi v. Stahl Associates Company with an event titled "The Braschi Breakthrough: 30 Years Later, Looking Back on the Relationship Recognition Landmark."' Participants included Braschi's sister Giannina Braschi.
