= Braschi v. Stahl Associates Co. =

1989 New York Court of Appeals case

- Court: New York Court of Appeals
- Full case name: Miguel Braschi, Appellant, v. Stahl Associates Company, Respondent.
- Decided: July 6, 1989
- Citations: 543 N.E.2d 49; 74 NY.2d 201; 544 N.Y.S.2d 784

Court membership
- Judges sitting: Sol Wachtler, (Note: Though Wachtler was on the court, he did not take part in the case.) Richard D. Simons, Judith S. Kaye, Fritz W. Alexander II, Vito J. Titone, Stewart F. Hancock Jr., Joseph W. Bellacosa

Case opinions
- Decision by: Titone
- Concurrence: Kaye, Alexander, Bellacosa
- Dissent: Simons, Hancock

Keywords
- Inheritance; LGBT rights; Sexual orientation discrimination

Braschi v. Stahl Associates Co. was a 1989 New York Court of Appeals case that decided that the surviving partner of a same-sex relationship counted as "family" under New York law and was thus able to continue living in a rent controlled apartment belonging to the deceased partner.

The litigant, Miguel Braschi, had been in a long-term relationship and lived with his partner Leslie Blanchard, who rented an apartment on East 54th Street in Manhattan. Blanchard had died of AIDS in 1986—Braschi had been a dutiful caregiver during his partner's illness and a loving partner of over ten years.

Under Section 2204.6(d) of New York state's Rent and Eviction Regulations, eviction of a "surviving spouse or family members" is prohibited. Braschi argued that this applied to his relationship with his deceased partner. The Appellate Division court rejected this and argued that "homosexuals cannot yet legally marry or enter into legally recognized relationships", and that the Rent and Eviction Regulations were intended to provide protection to those in "traditional, legally recognized familial relationships".

In a subsequent appeal, the New York Court of Appeals found that a "more realistic, and certainly equally valid, view of a family includes two adult lifetime partners whose relationship is long term and characterized by an emotional and financial commitment and interdependence". Application of this standard allowed Braschi to be considered a family member and prevented his eviction from the apartment. The decision was the first time a court in the United States granted any kind of legal recognition to a same-sex couple.

== Impact and legacy ==
Legal scholar Carlos A. Ball, in his legal history text, From the Closet to the Courtroom, devoted an entire chapter to the Braschi case, highlighting its importance for several reasons:

1. The recognition of LGBT families: "[T]he fact that the highest court of New York adopted the movement's position on what constitutes a family ... that LGBT people were as capable of forming living and lasting familial ties as were straight people."
2. The decision itself was "revolutionary": "The groundbreaking nature of the ruling becomes especially clear when it is juxtaposed with the almost complete absence of legal recognition of same-sex relationships anywhere in the country at the time the opinion was issued."
3. It was the first step for several later government actions that helped LGBT people: "It seems clear in hindsight that Braschi served as a catalyst for the series of incremental steps taken by both the state and city governments that expanded the forms of recognition of same-sex relationships."
4. It raised the public profile of gays, taking them literally "from the closet to the courtroom": "To put it simply, same-sex couples in New York after Braschi were no longer legally invisible."
5. It was an important legal precedent: "There have been so many relationship-recognition lawsuits since then, that it is perhaps easy to forget that it was all preceded by a housing case from New York in which an American appellate court, for the first time in the nation's history, concluded that same-sex relationships are entitled to legal protection and recognition."
6. It was an exemplar of the gradualist method: "Of the five cases profiled in this book, none reflects the movement's gradualist approach better than Braschi. Rather than seeking to have same-sex relationships recognized in many different contexts, the Braschi litigation sought to persuade New York courts to hold that a committed same-sex relationship could constitute a family within the meaning of the Rent Control law."
7. It was, as of 2010, one of the top "Five LBGT Rights Lawsuits That Have Changed Our Nation".

== Cultural exhibitions and retrospectives ==
- The 2017 exhibition AIDS at Home: Art and Everyday Activism, presented at the Museum of the City of New York explored how HIV/AIDS played out in the everyday lives of diverse communities in New York. The section on "Family" featured legal documents and photos related to the 1986 legal case of Miguel Braschi.
- In 2019, the LGBTQ Commission of the New York Courts commemorated the 30th anniversary of the New York Court of Appeals’ decision in Braschi v. Stahl Associates Company with a project entitled "The Braschi Breakthrough: 30 Years Later, Looking Back on the Relationship Recognition Landmark."' Participants included Matthew J. Skinner of Failla LGBTQ Commission; Hon. George Silvery, Hon. Anthony Cannataro, Henry M. Greenberg, President of NYS Bar Association, law clerk to Hon. Judith S. Kaye in 1989; Senator Thomas K. Duane, Harvard Law Professor William Rubenstein, who argued the case as a young ACLU attorney, and author Giannina Braschi, sister of the late plaintiff Miguel Braschi.

== See also ==
- Fitzpatrick v Sterling Housing Association Ltd (1999), a case in the UK House of Lords with a similar fact pattern and outcome.

== Books ==
- Ball, Carlos (2010). From the Closet to the Courtroom: Five LBGT Rights Lawsuits That Have Changed Our Nation. Boston, Massachusetts: Beacon Press. ISBN 978-0-8070-0078-6.
