= Vito J. Titone =

American judge (1929–2005)

Associate Judge of the New York Court of Appeals
- In office May 28, 1985 – September 1, 1998
- Appointed by: Mario Cuomo
- Preceded by: Lawrence H. Cooke
- Succeeded by: Albert Rosenblatt

Personal details
- Born: July 5, 1929; Brooklyn, New York City, New York
- Died: July 6, 2005 (aged 76); Staten Island, New York City, New York
- Political party: Democratic

Vito Joseph Titone (July 5, 1929 – July 6, 2005) was an American judge who served as an Associate Judge of the New York Court of Appeals from 1985 to 1998.

Titone was known as a liberal lion of the state's highest court. One of his most notable decisions was the majority opinion in Braschi v. Stahl, which recognized for the first time that a gay couple could be considered a family under the law.

Born in Brooklyn, New York, and raised in Queens, Titone received his law degree from St. John's University School of Law, where he was a classmate and close friend with future Governor Mario Cuomo, who later appointed Titone to the Court of Appeals. He died on July 6, 2005, in Staten Island, New York City, New York at age 76.
