= Pink Panthers (advocacy group) =

New York City LGBTQ rights group

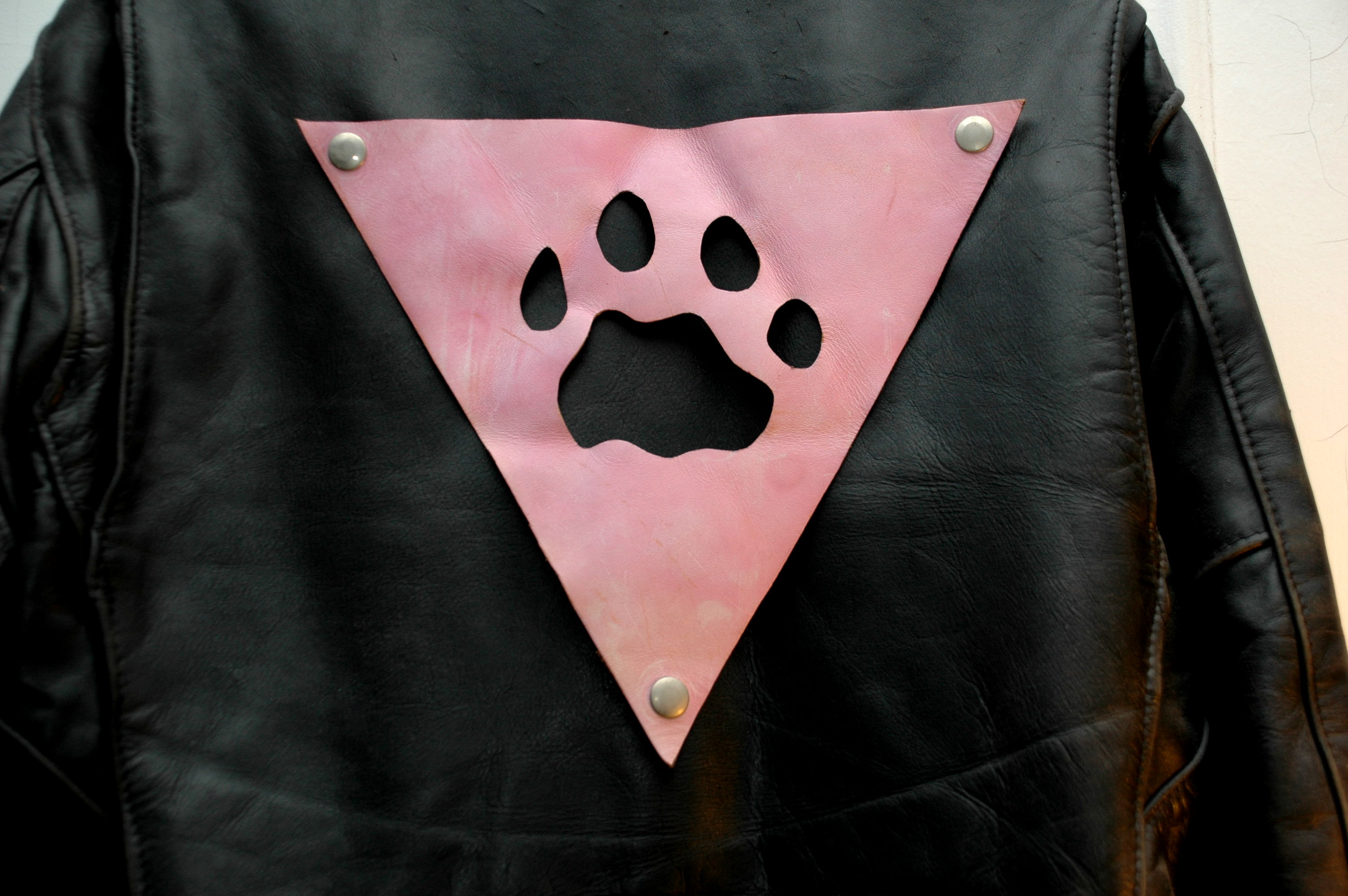
- Pink Panthers logo patch on jacket
- Formation: 1990
- Type: Direct action
- Headquarters: New York City

The Pink Panthers Patrol (often shortened to Pink Panthers) was a gay liberation civilian patrol group based in New York City, founded by members of Queer Nation in the summer of 1990 in order to combat anti-LGBT violence in Manhattan's West Village. Homophobic attacks in New York, derogatorily called "gay bashings", were happening on the streets with regularity at the time. The organization's logo was the pink triangle with a paw print in it.

Gerri Wells co-founded the organization, and claimed that the name was inspired by the Black Panthers and the Gray Panthers. The Pink Panthers recruited about 150 members shortly after its establishment. The members would organize into groups to do foot patrols in gay areas. These patrols would carry whistles to scare off assailants, and some groups carried citizens band radios to call for help. If necessary they would seek police support. In case of an attack, they would intervene to protect the victim. The neighborhood watch group would patrol areas that had a large number of gang assaults on LGBTQ people. In New York City, where the Pink Panthers was founded, these patrols would generally include Greenwich Village, the East Village, and the West Village.

The Pink Panthers received attention when they were successfully sued in 1991 by MGM Pictures, the owner of the rights to the Pink Panther film and cartoon franchise. After the lawsuit, the group went by the name Outwatch.

== See also ==
- White Panther Party
- Rainbow Coalition
- List of LGBT rights organisations
- Pink capitalism

== Further consideration ==
- MGM-Pathe Communications v. Pink Panther Patrol, 1991 lawsuit
