= Fitzpatrick v Sterling Housing Association Ltd =

- Court: House of Lords
- Full case name: FITZPATRICK (A.P.)(APPELLANT) v. STERLING HOUSING ASSOCIATION LTD. (RESPONDENTS)
- Decided: 29 October 1999
- Citation: Fitzpatrick v. Sterling Housing Association Ltd [1999] UKHL 42; [1999] 4 All ER 705; [1999] 3 WLR 1113 (28 October 1999)
- Transcript: judgment

Court membership
- Judges sitting: Lord Slynn of Hadley, Lord Nicholls of Birkenhead, Lord Clyde, Lord Hutton, Lord Hobhouse of Wood-borough

Fitzpatrick v Sterling Housing Association Ltd was a 1999 legal case heard by the Judicial Committee of the House of Lords regarding the meaning of the word 'family' with regards to the Rent Act 1977. The Lords found that a gay couple living together could be seen as a family for the purposes of housing law, and that a family relationship did not require either a blood relationship (as between parent and child) or marriage (at the time, neither marriage nor civil partnerships were available for same-sex couples).

Under the Rent Act (and later amendments under the Housing Act 1998), protected tenants could pass on their tenancy to spouses or cohabiting family members upon their death. The claimant in this case, Martin Fitzpatrick, had lived with his partner John Thompson from 1976 until his death in 1994, having met in 1969. Thompson had rented the flat from 1972 onwards. The law allows for succession in a tenancy agreement for spouses, those "living with him or her as a husband or wife", and members of one's family who have resided in the flat for at least two years before the tenant's death. The Court of Appeal rejected Mr Fitzpatrick's initial appeal, citing the precedent of Harrogate Borough Council v Simpson where the Court of Appeal determined that "living together as husband and wife" did not extend to a homosexual couple. The Court of Appeal decision expressed considerable sympathy for the appellant, citing his selfless dedication to caring for his partner for many years, but stated that it was the job of Parliament to change the law to extend protected tenancy succession rights to same-sex couples.

The House of Lords allowed that the appellant and his partner did constitute a family for legal purposes. The Lords decision agreed that there was not a spousal relationship (which they interpreted to mean a heterosexual marriage), nor were they "living together as a husband or wife" (which they interpreted as providing protection only for unmarried heterosexual couples), but stated that a long-term same-sex relationship could be considered a family even without the ties of blood or marriage. The decision was welcomed by gay rights campaigners including the campaign group Stonewall.

== See also ==
- Braschi v. Stahl Associates Co. (1989), a case heard in the appellate courts of the State of New York with a similar fact pattern and outcome
