= Queers Read This =

1990 essay about queer identity

- Cover page of "Queers Read This"

"Queers Read This" (also stylized "QUEERS READ THIS!" and known by one of its components, "I Hate Straights") is an anonymously written essay about queer identity. It was originally circulated by members of the Anonymous Queers collective as a broadsheet at the June 1990 New York Gay Pride Parade, and is generally understood as the group's manifesto.

The essay characterizes queerness as being based on social situation and action, in contrast to gay and lesbian identity which are considered to be based on "natural" or inherent characteristics. Across multiple sections which use various voices and tones, it lays out a rationale for the reappropriation of the term queer and suggests that to be queer is to constantly fight against oppression.

"Queers Read This" is regarded as one of the earliest articulations of queer activism and queer theory, with queer theory later expanding upon many concepts discussed in the essay. However, some scholars opined it criticizes heterosexuality rather than heteronormativity.

== Background ==
How can I tell you, how can I convince you, brother, sister that your life is in danger: That everyday you wake up alive, relatively happy, and a functioning human being, you are committing a rebellious act. You as an alive and functioning queer are a revolutionary.

— Opening lines of "Queers Read This"

The term queer was initially used as a pejorative against LGBT people. In the late 1980s, the term began to be reappropriated by activists. This reappropriation, especially popular among people of color, was associated with radical politics and rejection of liberal conservatism in the LGBT community.

The period during which "Queers Read This" was written was characterized by heterosexism and homophobia, the HIV/AIDS epidemic in the United States, and frequent discriminatory violence on the basis of sexual orientation and gender expression. By early April of 1990, instances of violence against LGBT people had increased 122 percent from the start of the same year, prompting the creation of direct action group Queer Nation by members of ACT UP.

The evolution of queerness as a concept in the early 1990s was shaped by this context. It was often associated with a sense of anger and a rejection of existing societal structures.

== Publication ==
It is unclear who wrote "Queers Read This". The byline on the original essay reads "published anonymously by queers", and Queer Nation did not explicitly claim responsibility for the piece; it was controversial within the group as some interpreted it as advocating queer separatism or anti-heterosexual sentiment. However, the essay was generally attributed to Queer Nation and understood as a manifesto.

Members of Anonymous Queers first circulated "Queers Read This" in broadsheet form at the June 1990 New York Gay Pride Parade. Each pamphlet was a single sheet of standard-sized newsprint, printed on both sides and folded in half to create four pages. Title text on the front of the pamphlet read "Queers Read This", while similar text on the back said "I Hate Straights". Roughly 15,000 copies of the essay were distributed by Queer Nation members marching with the ACT UP contingent in the parade. It was subsequently distributed from individual to individual through photocopies, fax, and mail.

== Content ==
"Queers Read This" is divided into multiple distinct sections, written in different voices

"Queers Read This" uses informal and accessible language. It includes many concepts on which the field of queer theory, nascent at the time the piece was written, would later elaborate. It additionally addresses the HIV/AIDS epidemic in the United States and the lack of an effective response to the epidemic at the time of writing.

The essay includes multiple separate but overlapping sections with diverse voices. Its tone is consistently urgent and varies between upbeat, negative, and angry. Speaking to conservative and disengaged LGBT people along with politically active queers, the essay takes a polemic tone in asserting that queer existence is political and revolutionary in and of itself. It tells queer people to "let yourself be angry", rejecting the idea "that good queers don’t get mad". It additionally calls for heterosexual society to be held accountable, asserting that "until I can enjoy the same freedom of movement and sexuality, as straights, their privilege must stop and it must be given over to me and my queer sisters and brothers".

"Queers Read This" consistently challenges its reader to be more visibly and actively queer, and characterizes queer identity not only as an expression of sexual orientation but also a commitment to specific action. It calls for LGBT pride and encourages coming out, at one point asking the reader to "tear yourself away from your customary state of acceptance". A section focused on lesbian visibility asserts that queer women should involve themselves in revolution: "Girl, you can't wait for other dykes to make the world safe for you. Stop waiting for a better more lesbian future! The revolution could be here if we started it."

The essay characterizes queerness as a community accessible through choice and action, rather than a group demarcated by inherent characteristics. Queer identity is thus contrasted with gay or lesbian identity.

=== Identity and the term queer ===
The essay's use of the term queer and conceptualization of queer identity alienated some potential readers when it was initially distributed; journalist Esther Kaplan noted that some parade-goers refused to take a copy of the pamphlet because it used the word. According to E. J. Rand, the effect of the title "Queers Read This" is that anyone reading the essay "must accept, no matter how momentarily or skeptically, being named as a queer". The use of the term queer is justified in the essay itself as follows, in a section titled "Why Queer":

Ah, do we really have to use that word? It's trouble. Every gay person has his or her own take on it. For some it means strange and eccentric and kind of mysterious [...] And for others 'queer' conjures up those awful memories of adolescent suffering [...] Well, yes, 'gay' is great. It has its place. But when a lot of lesbians and gay men wake up in the morning we feel angry and disgusted, not gay. So we've chosen to call ourselves queer. Using 'queer' is a way of reminding us how we are perceived by the rest of the world.

The essay also specifically acknowledges the reappropriation of the term, stating that "QUEER can be a rough word but it is also a sly and ironic weapon we can steal from the homophobe's hands and use against him". In this context, it defines queer as "leading a different sort of life" in opposition to "the mainstream, profit-margins, patriotism, patriarchy or being assimilated". It also notes that the term is gender neutral: "Queer, unlike GAY, doesn't mean MALE."

This framing of queerness as a marginalized identity, and constitution of the reader as a member of that marginalized group, provides a basis for the text's view as to what queerness means and should mean. At one point the essay asserts that "being queer is not about a right to privacy; it is about the freedom to be public, to just be who we are. It means everyday fighting oppression; homophobia, racism, misogyny, the bigotry of religious hypocrites and our own self-hatred."

=== "I Hate Straights" ===
The final page of the pamphlet contained a single section with the title "I Hate Straights".

== Reception ==
=== Contemporary reactions ===
"Queers Read This" was controversial upon publication even within the group itself, and some people at the parade objected to its use of the term queer or refused to take a copy upon seeing the word. Despite this, Queer Nation's distribution of the pamphlet at the 1990 pride parade, and subsequent press coverage, established the group's public reputation. Media coverage brought the group to a national audience, leading to the establishment of a chapter in San Francisco. Chapters in other major cities in the United States quickly followed.

Shortly after the essay's initial distribution, an Outweek article characterized it as "not a particularly unusual Pride Day literature drop" with the exception "that the liberated tenor of the entire publication culminated in the final essay, whose title boldly declared, 'I Hate Straights.'" The author of the Outweek article, Nina Reyes, found the essay to be a "persuasive argument for unified queer intolerance" and queer separatism; Reyes praised its unapologetically angry tone and described its title as "concise, eloquent and abrupt" with a favorable comparison to "Ain't I a Woman?".

The Outweek article recounted that the pamphlet sparked "a ferocious debate" within the queer community. At a meeting of ACT UP the day after the parade, a straight woman was applauded after condemning the "I Hate Straights" essay, while a gay man's defense of the essay was poorly received. Both supporters and opponents of the essay acknowledged that its distribution alongside the ACT UP contingent "inappropriately linked the organization to the publication," violating the group's decision-making practices. Beyond concerns about process, the debate over the pamphlet within ACT UP reflected tensions between the group's dual identities as a big tent anti-AIDS group that did not publicly identify itself as a gay organization and a "de facto gay-liberation political-action machine".

=== Academic analysis ===
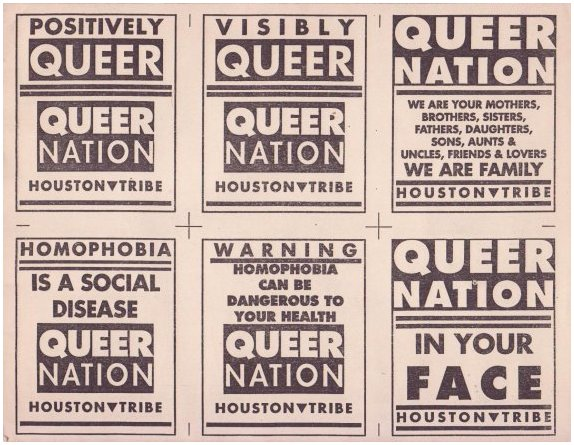
Queer Nation posters in Houston

"Queers Read This" has received academic attention, and has frequently been presented as the origin of queer theory and radical queer activism. It was not the first use of the term queer in this context; the word began to be reappropriated in the late 1980s. By 1990, a conference at the University of California, Santa Cruz was titled "Queer Theory", members of ACT UP self-identified as queer, and Queer Nation had been founded. In 2013, Yasmin Nair stated in the Windy City Times that the "Queers Read This" pamphlet was among "the clearest expressions" of this new language.

The essay has been critiqued for allegedly targeting heterosexuality rather than heteronormativity. In a 1997 critique of queer activism, Cathy J. Cohen cited the essay to support her argument that "instead of destabilizing the assumed categories and binaries of sexual identity, queer politics has served to reinforce simple dichotomies between heterosexual and everything 'queer'". Cohen argued that while "queer activists and queer theorists are tied to and rooted in a tradition of political struggle most often identified with people of color and other marginal groups", this dichotomization created a reductive understanding of oppression that lacked class consciousness and failed to account for racial oppression. She argued that a focus on heteronormativity would allow "recognition that 'nonnormative' procreation patterns and family structures of people who are labeled heterosexual have also been used to regulate and exclude them". Martin Joseph Ponce echoed Cohen in 2018, writing that the essay "fails to account for manifestations of queer privilege and heterosexual disadvantage constituted by class, racial, and gender asymmetries". Ulrika Dahl suggested that this critical stance toward heterosexuality as a whole represented a connection to lesbian separatism.

== See also ==
- Frente de Liberación Homosexual
- Bash Back!
