= Carlos A. Ball =

American law professor and author

Carlos Ball
- Born: 1964 (age 61–62)
- Partner: Richard Storrow
- Children: 2

Academic background
- Education: Tufts University (BA); Columbia University (JD); University of Cambridge (LLM)

Academic work
- Discipline: Lawyer, author
- Sub-discipline: LGBT rights, First Amendment, Constitutional law
- Institutions: University of Illinois College of Law; Penn State Law; Rutgers Law School

Carlos A. Ball (born 1964) is an American law professor and author. He is a distinguished professor of law at Rutgers Law School. Ball is the author of several books on the subjects of LGBT rights, the First Amendment, and Constitutional law.

== Education ==
Ball completed a Bachelor of Arts in political science and history, summa cum laude, at Tufts University in 1986. He was inducted into Phi Beta Kappa. He earned a J.D. from Columbia Law School in 1990 and a LL.M. from University of Cambridge in 1995.

== Career ==
Ball was a clerk for the Massachusetts Supreme Judicial Court from 1990 to 1991. He worked for the Legal Aid Society as a criminal defense attorney from 1991 to 1993. Ball was served as legal council for HIV and Tuberculosis policy for the New York City Department of Health and Mental Hygiene from 1993 to 1994. He taught at University of Illinois College of Law and Penn State Law where he was a professor of law and the Weiss Family Distinguished Faculty Scholar. In 2008, Ball joined the faculty at Rutgers Law School as a professor of law and Judge Frederick Lacey Scholar. In July 2013, he became a distinguished professor of law at Rutgers. His work focuses on LGBT rights issues. He teaches courses on sexuality and gender identity law, the First Amendment, and Constitutional law.

== Personal life ==
Ball has a son and a daughter with his husband Richard Storrow.

== Selected works ==
=== Books ===
- Ball, Carlos A. (2003). The Morality of Gay Rights: An Exploration in Political Philosophy. Psychology Press. ISBN 9780415931410.
- Ball, Carlos A. (2010). From the Closet to the Courtroom: Five LGBT Rights Lawsuits that Have Changed Our Nation. Beacon Press. ISBN 9780807000786.
- Ball, Carlos A. (2014). The Right to Be Parents: LGBT Families and the Transformation of Parenthood. NYU Press. ISBN 9781479803163.
- Ball, Carlos A. (2016). Same-Sex Marriage and Children: A Tale of History, Social Science, and Law. Oxford University Press. ISBN 9780190628598.
- Ball, Carlos A. (2016). After Marriage Equality: The Future of LGBT Rights. NYU Press. ISBN 9781479883080.
- Ball, Carlos A. (2017). The First Amendment and LGBT Equality. Harvard University Press. ISBN 9780674972193.
- Ball, Carlos A. (2019). The Queering of Corporate America: How Big Business Went from LGBTQ Adversary to Ally. Beacon Press. ISBN 9780807026359.
