= Latino literature =

Literary genre

Latino literature is literature written by people of Latin American ancestry, often but not always in English, most notably by Mexican Americans, Puerto Ricans, Cuban Americans, and Dominican Americans, many of whom were born in the United States. The origin of the term "Latino literature" dates back to the 1960s, during the Chicano Movement, which was a social and political movement by Mexican Americans seeking equal rights and representation. At the time, the term "Chicano literature" was used to describe the work of Mexican-American writers. As the movement expanded, the term "Latino" came into use to encompass writers of various Latin American backgrounds, including Mexican, Puerto Rican, Cuban, and others.

Notable writers include: Elizabeth Acevedo, Julia Alvarez, Gloria Anzaldua, Rudolfo Anaya, Giannina Braschi, Julia de Burgos, Ana Castillo, Sandra Cisneros, Junot Díaz, Cristina García, Oscar Hijuelos, Judith Ortiz Cofer, Piri Thomas, Rudy Ruiz, Denise Chavez, Cherrie Moraga, Kathleen Alcalá, Carmen Maria Machado, and Edmundo Paz Soldan, among others.

== The complexity of Latino literature ==
Latino literature is a fast growing field and it is extremely dense. A common misunderstanding about Latino Literature is that it is brand new. Many forgotten and neglected works are being brought out and some significantly old. New writers are emerging and new archival discoveries of written and spoken works are being published. The Latino Literature field is not limited to journals, diaries, poetry, but it includes several other forms of literature. Since the Latino community is heavily diverse the work is expansive, there is not a single voice in the field but a combination of unique voices, styles, feelings, and stories. Whether the writer is from Mexico, Puerto Rico, Cuba, Central America or an Indigenous Latino, all the cultures contribute their own distinct perspective. The Latino's sense of independence allows for their area of literature to be in a position of constant change.

Ilan Stavans the general editor of The Norton Anthology of Latino Literature uses the term, "the Latino condition" when referring to the constant "state of mutation" that happens in the Latino community. Whether it is the common change of migration or something like language and or dialect, changes occur often in their community. These changes then transfers to their literature. Stavans believes that you can overall summarize Latino literature as work that expresses the act of trying to be at home somewhere that is not your origin. Within that idea is the feeling of belonging in two different places and yet still trying to identify with both. There is a constant pull in directions in the life of a Latino and that is often conveyed in their literature. Many try to define Latino literature but it is best undefined because the community has gone through many different situations over the years. Between 1537-1810 a lot of Latino's experienced colonization and between 1811-1898 some experienced invasions or annexations. However, nowadays most of their literature is thought to be only connected to their migration story but, their literature encompasses much more and will constantly evolve.

=== The role of anthologies ===
Although there is "The Norton Anthology of Latino Literature", the general editor Ilan Stavans says that it is clearly out of date but, other editors think that Latino literature has simply changed in many ways. An anthology is meant to collect different works that are related to each other by a topic. The literary work in an anthology is meant to represent a topic that is bigger than the individual work, it is meant to add to a conversation. Any anthology of Latino literature will define the topic as a whole, these anthologies have the power to shape the growth of the literature. This produces a sort of outline for what a literary piece should look like within the topic area. The literary work that is placed in an anthology is molded into a work that is now understood through the topic area. Professionals like Ilan Stavans and Karen Lorraine Cresci believe that original literary pieces are manipulated to adapt to the subject matter. Publishing companies play a role on what is chosen to be published within an anthology and what is not. Oftentimes they chose what will sell better. Therefore there can be absences, omissions and blurry groups within the Latino community, that are not taking part of Latino literature.

There is a complexity in Latino literature but an anthology has the power to contribute definitions to the ever changing topic. Karen Lorraine Cresci does research on six different Latino literature anthologies published between 1996 and 2010. There is significant amount of time between the first and the last anthology published. All of the anthologies added something different that was not published in a previous anthology. Some anthologies published from 2010 and on have left room for other areas like fantasy, science fiction, comic books and more. That is because there is a need for a wider scope of representation for those Latinos who are a minority within their own community. Karen understands that anthologies are important for shaping Latino literature but she believes that anthologies need to be more inclusive. In Karen's point of view, yes Latino literature is ever changing but the broadness of the Latino experience and community needs to be embraced.

== Indigenous Latinos in literature ==
In a conversation between two Latin studies professors from Vanderbilt University, Lorraine Lopez mentions how Latino literature is extremely diverse, however the freedom to explore as a Latino writer has just recently been allowed. Lorraine says that her role as a writer is to take into account all the specific details of culture and language. If the same assumptions and stereotypes are made in each literary work then there are no advancements. By developing characters that are constantly evolving and adapting to the changes that are occurring around, the writer is allowing the readers to connect to the literary piece. Latino literature as a genre has evolved and with every new generation of writers comes a new set of complex themes that need to be unraveled. Themes about personal and collective identity, challenges of living between cultures, intersectionality and more. All themes have to keep making progress and advance in a way that the generation before did not.

Since previously there has been a lack of freedom in writing and publishing literary pieces that do not follow the line of Latino tradition, there has been a group that has been overlooked in the Latino community. The Indigenous community has often been rejected from within the Latino community. The Indigenous Latinos also have been affected by issues colonialism, migration, race and more, but there is little insight on Latino Indigeneity. Aside from the fact that there are Indigenous people that are in fact Latino, they also share struggles with the general group. The Indigenous group is often neglected in the physical world but also in the literary world as there are not many literary pieces within the topic area of Latino literature. Indigenous Latinos have plenty of languages, cultures practices and indigenous sovereignty to share within the literary world. As part of the advancement of Latino literature there needs to a light shed on the indigenous histories and experiences, this will allow for the topic to become more complex and continue to be ever changing.

== Rise of Latino literature in American academies ==
A major development in late-20th-century American literature was the proliferation of writing by and about Latinos. The literary mixing of US and Spanish American culture, history, and social concerns is intensified by the inception of Latino literature written in English in the second half of the 20th century, in which authors such as Cristina García, Julia Álvarez, Gloria Anzaldúa, Oscar Hijuelos, Piri Thomas, Pedro Pietri, Miguel Piñero, and, of course, the aforementioned Díaz and Alarcón all begin to write texts that speak to Latino experience both in the United States and abroad in Latin America and the Caribbean. This coincided with the Civil Rights Movement and its related ethnic pride movements; these led to the formation of Ethnic Studies and Latino Studies programs in major American universities. Latino Studies stemmed from the development of Chicano Studies and Puerto Rican Studies programs in response to demands articulated by student movements in the late 1960s. Such programs were established, alongside other new areas of literary study as women's literature, gay and lesbian literature, postcolonial literature, Third World Feminism, and the rise of literary theory. Many works dramatize social justice issues that disproportionally impact Latino communities, such as discrimination, racism, harassment, incarceration, border and immigration issues. There is a plethora of scholarship about Latino people in a range of fields, including literature, theater, popular culture, religion, Spanglish linguistics, politics, and urban planning. Latino literature explores American identity and addresses various controversial topics such as immigration, the US-Mexico border, Spanglish, Latino LGBTQ sexuality, and the dual consciousness experienced by Latino minorities. By delving into these issues, Latino literature enriches the American literary canon and promotes understanding and empathy towards the experiences of Latino communities in the United States.

== Prominent writers ==
=== Latina ===
In the 1990s, Sandra Cisneros and Julia Alvarez helped blaze the trail for Latina authors with novels such as In the Time of the Butterflies, The House on Mango Street, and How the García Girls Lost Their Accents, winning praise from critics and gracing best-seller lists across the Americas. Precursors of Latino philosophy and Third World Feminisms are Cherrie Moraga and Gloria Anzaldua, best known for their collaboration of groundbreaking feminist anthology This Bridge Called My Back.

=== Chicano ===
Groundbreaking Chicana books that are still widely studied include: The Last of the Menu Girls (Denise Chavez), Borderlands/La Frontera: The New Mestiza (Gloria Anzaldúa), and So Far from God (Ana Castillo). Other Chicana/o writers of note are Jimmy Santiago Baca, Lorna Dee Cervantes, and Leroy V. Quintana.

=== Puerto Rican ===
Celebrated Puerto Rican novels include Piri Thomas's Down These Mean Streets and Giannina Braschi's Yo-Yo Boing! and her geopolitical comic tragedy in English about the liberation of Puerto Rico, United States of Banana. Other novels of note are Rosario Ferré's Eccentric Neighborhoods, Luis Rafael Sánchez's Macho Camacho's Beat, and Richie Narvaez's Hipster Death Rattle. Puerto Rico and its diaspora have also produced important playwrights such as René Marqués, Luis Rafael Sánchez, José Rivera, and Lin-Manuel Miranda, and poets such as Julia de Burgos, Miguel Algarin, Giannina Braschi, and Pedro Pietri, as well as various members of the Nuyorican Poets Café.

=== Latino writer ===
The definition of “Latino writer” used here is the same as that developed by William Luis in his study of Latino Caribbean Literature, Dance Between Two Cultures (1997). Luis’s definition is predicated on distinguishing Hispanic writers—“who were raised and educated in their native countries and later emigrated or were forced to flee to the United States,” and who write, “mostly about themes pertaining to their island of provenance”—from Latino writers—“who were born and raised in the United States and who for the most part write in English” (xi). Debate exists amongst the scholarly community as to whether or not to adopt the term “Latino as a more inclusive, non-gendered way of making reference to what has been previously referred to as “Latino” cultural production. As no term has yet been standardized in academic publications, and given that this article does not explicitly refer to queer Latino authors, I will maintain Luis’ terminology throughout the essay, while reminding the reader that the term “Latino literature” is intended here to be absolutely inclusive, referring the work of male, female, and queer authors who do not identify within a binary gender classification system."

=== Dominican-American ===
Dominican-American author Junot Díaz, received the Pulitzer Prize for Fiction for his 2007 novel The Brief Wondrous Life of Oscar Wao, which tells the story of an overweight Dominican boy growing up as a social outcast in New Jersey. Another Dominican author, Julia Alvarez, is well known for How the García Girls Lost Their Accents and In the Time of the Butterflies.

=== Cuban ===
Prominent Cuban-American works include Roberto G. Fernandez’ Raining Backwards (1988), Cristina Garcia’s Dreaming in Cuban (1992), and Oscar Hijuelos’ The Mambo Kings Play Songs of Love (1989); and their colleagues in poetry Ana Menéndez, Richard Blanco, and Rafael Campo. Latino philosophers from Cuba who write about the intersection of literature and philosophy include Jorge J. E. Gracia, Ofelia Schutte, Rolando Perez, and Gustavo Perez Firmat.

=== Poetry ===
Framing: jíbaro poetry and the prologue The poem Santiago chooses to frame her narrative is “Claroscuro,” by Luis Lloréns Torres, an appropriate choice since he is considered Puerto Rico’s national poet. 9 El bohío de la loma, Bajo sus alas de paja, Siente el frescor mañanero Y abre sus ojos al alba. (xiii)

=== Borderland cultures ===
"As a zone of interpenetration between two previously distinct peoples.” However, partly because of a “stigma” attached to the term frontier (the backlash against the Turner Thesis), historians have suggested alternatives such as the “contact zone,” or Richard White’s “Middle Space.”1 Borderlands has come to be favored by many anthropologists over frontiers because it suggests a series of “contested boundaries” which “define a geopolitical space,” as Bradley Parker puts it (2006: 80). Literary critics have also found the concept useful to analyze a body of literature that transgresses binary divisions between nations, languages, and cultures.The concept of borderland cultures, in a North American context, has most often been applied to the “contact zone” between the U.S. and Mexico. But this concept is being applied to similar processes going on in other borderlands around the world. Although borderlands are not new historically (Bradley 2006), they are one pronounced type of the contemporary transnational flows which have created the multi-centered identities so typical of the era of globalization."

== 21st-century trends ==
=== Coming-of-age stories ===
In recent years, a new wave of writers has emerged in the genre of Latino coming-of-age novels, exploring the experiences of young female protagonists as they navigate the challenges of school and biculturalism. Some notable works in this category include "I Am Not Your Perfect Mexican Daughter" by Erika L. Sánchez (2017) and "The Poet X" by Elizabeth Acevedo (2018), both of which have garnered critical acclaim and captured the attention of readers from diverse backgrounds.

For young readers in middle school, The Other Half of Happy by Rebecca Balcárcel tells a coming of age story, one of a young girl's longing to return to her father's homeland of Guatemala. Daniel Alarcón’s At Night We Walk in Circles offer up political satire, such as the plot of an aspiring young actor living in a war-torn, unnamed South American, who lands a role in a farcical play “The Idiot President” and takes the role too seriously. In stark contrast are the autobiographically inspired adult fiction titles such as Lina Meruane's Seeing Red, about the fear of going blind and having to depend on a lover. This Is How You Lose Her by Junot Díaz (2012) a young student is inappropriately involved in a sexual relationship with an older women. "Bless Me, Ultima" is a renowned Chicano novel written by Rudolfo Anaya, which is commonly included in the curriculum of middle and high schools across America. The novel takes place in rural New Mexico during the 1940s, and it portrays the curandera (spiritual healing) practices of the area, including the collection of healing herbs. The story revolves around a young boy who finds himself grappling with cultural, religious, and ethical conflicts within his community of farmers, priests, cowboys, and soldiers.These conflicting elements of his society shape his personal growth and development as he comes of age.

=== Emergence of Authors from Central America ===
As the population of Central Americans in the United States grew in the 21st century, there was also a noticeable increase in literary contributions from authors of that region. One of the key examples of this was the publication of "Latino Boom: An Anthology of U.S. Latino Literature", which was the first anthology of its kind to provide both scholarly and pedagogical resources. This influential work was co-edited by John S. Christie and Jose B. Gonzalez, a Salvadoran-American author. Salvadoran-American poets such as William Archila, Claudia Castro Luna, Jose B. Gonzalez, Leticia Hernandez Linares, and Javier Zamora published poetry collections that reflected on the Salvadoran Civil War and their own migrations. Leticia Hernandez also co-edited, along with Ruben Martinez and Hector Tobar, The Wandering Song: Central American Writing in the United States, the first major collection of Central American writing in the U.S.

Other notable authors who have family roots in Central America include: Nicaraguan-American Francisco Aragon; Guatemalan-American, Francisco Goldman; Panamanian-American Author, Christina Henriquez; Costa Rican-American poet, Ruben Quesada; and the Honduran-American poet, Roy G. Guzmán.

=== Latino speculative fiction and fantasy ===
The genres of Latino speculative fiction, science fiction, and fantasy are rapidly expanding, with an increasing number of works being produced in these areas. This growth has led to a surge in the production of Latino comic books and graphic novels, as highlighted in "Latino Rising," the first anthology of science fiction and fantasy by Latinos living in the United States. This development is significant for both the literary and cultural worlds, as it expands the representation of Latino voices in popular genres and provides new avenues for creative expression. Edited by Matthew David Goodwin and with an introduction by Frederick Luis Aldama, the anthology features a range of speculative and fantasy fiction (i.e., ghosts, aliens, superheroes, robots, talking sardines) written by Junot Díaz, Giannina Braschi, Kathleen Alcalá, Richie Narvaez, Carmen Maria Machado, Ana Castillo, Edmundo Paz Soldan, and emerging Latino short story authors such as Ernest Hogan and Sabrina Vourvoulias.

Latino speculative, fantasy, and weird fiction bring humor to fantastical, futuristic, comedic, and stark political subjects, offering readers strange new concepts such as: Los cosmos azteca, shape shifting robots, pre-Columbian holobooks, talking sardines, and patron saints that are cybernetically wired. Cultural theorist Christopher Gonzalez argues that Latino fantasy writing provides necessary excursions into the realm of impossible in order for writers and readers to cope with 21st-century realities. Latino authors write about interconnected social justice, familial, and psychological issues (i.e., colonialism, migration, racism, mass incarceration, and misogyny).

Carmen Maria Machado, author of Her Body and Other Parties, blends gothic romance, fantasy, and horror when dealing with misogyny. Giannina Braschi conjures, in United States of Banana, a bizarre cast of characters including things, creatures, and people (i.e., Cockroach, Exterminator, Reptiles, Lady Liberty, Fidel Castro, Hu Jintao, Barack Obama, Hamlet, Zarathustra, Pablo Neruda, and Rubén Darío). In dealing with issues of Puerto Rican sovereignty and debt, Braschi's work projects about what might happen if the United States sold Puerto Rico to China as debt relief. Pulitzer Prize winner Junot Díaz, author of Drown and the short fantasy story "Monstro", has noted that colonialism's roots in Caribbean culture involve fantasy, sci-fi, zombies, monsters, and aliens. Similarly, the short story "Room for Rent," by Puerto Rican author Richie Narvaez, in which the arrival of extraterrestrials is likened to the arrival of Christopher Columbus to the Caribbean, "evokes a dialogue between past and present colonial scenarios." Mexican-American author Rudy Ruiz has written dystopian sci-fi and magical realism works addressing social issues related to immigration, borders, social justice and machismo.

== See also ==
- Chicano literature
- Latino studies
- Latino poetry
- American Literature in Spanish
- List of Mexican-American writers
- List of Puerto Rican writers
- List of Cuban-American writers
- Nuyorican Movement
- Speculative fiction by writers of color
- Decolonization in Latino culture
- Latino theatre in the United States
- Latin American Canadians § Writers
