= Latin American Literary Review Press =

Latin American Literary Review
- Discipline: Literature
- Language: English, Spanish, Portuguese
- Edited by: Debra Castillo

Publication details
- History: 1972 to present
- Publisher: Latin American Research Commons for thee Latin American Literary Review/Press (United States)
- Frequency: Biannual

Standard abbreviations
- ISO 4: Lat. Am. Lit. Rev.

Indexing
- ISSN: 0047-4134 (print); 2330-135X (web)
- JSTOR: latinamerlitrev

Links
- Journal homepage; Publisher website

The Latin American Literary Review/Press, affiliated with the Department of Comparative Literature in Cornell University, Ithaca, New York, is a non-profit organization. The founding editor-in-chief was Yvette E. Miller. She has been succeeded by Debra A. Castillo.

Miller developed two entities: the Latin American Literary Review, a literary magazine, and the Latin American Literary Review Press, which published English translations of Latin American literature.

The Latin American Literary Review was established in 1972 and is published biannually. As of 2017 it has moved to an online platform with the Latin American Research Commons and Ubiquity Press. It contains feature essays, creative work, new translations of important texts, and reviews of recent literary works from Latin America. It publishes articles in English, Spanish, and Portuguese.

The Latin American Literary Review Press was founded in 1980 and has published creative writing and literary criticism that has been translated into English. The press was created with the principal objective of familiarizing readers outside the field with Latin American literature. Since Miller's death, the Press has been inactive.

== Notable publications ==
- Legends of Guatemala - by Miguel Ángel Asturias (ISBN 978-1-891270-53-6)
- Bubbeh - by Sabina Berman (ISBN 978-0-935480-93-1)
- My Heart Flooded with Water - selected poems by Alfonsina Storni (ISBN 978-1-891270-51-2)
- Bazaar of the Idiots - by Gustavo Álvarez Gardeazábal (ISBN 978-0-935480-48-1)
- Yo-Yo Boing! - by Giannina Braschi; introduction by Doris Sommer and Alexandra Vega Merino. (ISBN 978-0-935480-97-9)
- Memories of Underdevelopment - by Edmundo Desnoes (ISBN 978-1-891270-18-5)
- Nazarín - by Benito Pérez Galdós (ISBN 978-0-935480-75-7)
- Patient - by Ana María Shua (ISBN 978-0-935480-90-0)
- Breakthrough - by Mercedes Valdivieso (ISBN 978-0-935480-33-7)

== See also ==
- Bilingual Review Press
- The Bilingual Review
- Chiricú
- Hispanic and Latino Americans
- Aztlán: A Journal of Chicano Studies
- MELUS (Society for the Study of the Multi-Ethnic Literature)
- Review: Literature and Arts of the Americas
