= Roy Guzmán =

Roy Guzmán may refer to:

- Roy G. Guzmán, Honduran-American poet
- Roy F. Guzmán (born 1987), composer
