= Bilingual Press =

Publishing house

Bilingual Press Editorial Bilingüe
- Parent company: Hispanic Research Center, Arizona State University
- Status: Active
- Founded: 1973 (at City College of New York)
- Founder: Gary D. Keller
- Country of origin: United States
- Headquarters location: Arizona State University, Tempe, Arizona
- Distribution: Small Press Distribution
- Key people: Anita Huizar-Hernandez, publisher and managing editor
- Publication types: books
- Nonfiction topics: Chicano and Hispanic American studies
- Fiction genres: Chicano and Hispanic American literature
- Imprints: Bilingual Press/Editorial Bilingüe, Clásicos Chicanos/Chicano Classics
- Official website: hrc.asu.edu/bilingual-press/store

Bilingual Press/Editorial Bilingüe (formerly known as the Bilingual Review Press) is an American publishing house specialising in the publication of scholarly and literary works by Hispanic and Latino American authors and researchers. It was founded in 1973 as the publisher of The Bilingual Review/La revista bilingüe, a new academic and literary journal with a focus on Spanish-English bilingualism, bilingual studies and Hispanic literature that was first issued in 1974. The press also publishes and distributes book titles by or about Hispanic and Latin American authors, covering literary fiction, poetry as well as non-fiction titles relating to Chicano and Latin American studies. Bilingual Press published eight to ten titles annually, with an accumulated back catalogue of more than 150 titles under the imprint in both English and Spanish as well as some bilingual editions. The publisher is also a distributor of related titles from other presses, as of 2008 numbering over a thousand releases.

== Overview ==
The Editorial Bilingüe is based in Tempe, Arizona, at Arizona State University. It operates as an autonomous sub-entity of the University's Hispanic Research Center, which provides support services to the publishing enterprise. The press is maintained through a number of federal and private funding grants, including the National Endowment for the Arts, as well as returns on its publication sales.

The former director and general editor since its foundation was Gary D. Keller.

The company was established in 1973 as a publishing entity for The Bilingual Review/La revista bilingüe, a journal on Hispanic American studies and literature founded by Keller with support from scholarly grants. It was initially based out of the Department of Romance Languages at City College of New York. In 1975 it moved operations to York College and then later to the State University of New York at Binghamton. Since 1986, the Bilingual Review Press has been based on campus at Arizona State, following Keller's transfer to take up a position at the newly formed Hispanic Research Center.

The Editorial Bilingüe has published novels, poetry and essay contributions from both upcoming and established Hispanic and Latin American authors, including Virgil Suárez, Rafael C. Castillo, Alfred Arteaga, Sandra Cisneros, Daniel Olivas, and Rolando Hinojosa. Through both its own imprints and distribution of works first issued from other presses, it has also kept in circulation previous works of classic Latin American literature, reissuing lapsed or out-of-print titles by literary luminaries such as Carlos Fuentes, Isabel Allende, and Jorge Luis Borges.

Under the imprint Clásicos Chicanos/Chicano Classics, the company publishes specific and notable works of Chicano/Chicana literature. It is also the sole distributive agency for Latin American Literary Review Press publications, a publishing series established in 1980 devoted to English translations, literary criticism, and bilingual creative writing on Latin American literature, such as Miguel Ángel Asturias's Legends of Guatemala and Giannina Braschi's Yo-Yo Boing!

The Editorial Bilingüe is a member of CLMP, the community of literary magazines and presses.

== See also ==
- Chiricú
- Aztlán: A Journal of Chicano Studies
- Latin American Literary Review Press
- MELUS (Society for the Study of the Multi-Ethnic Literature)
- Review: Literature and Arts of the Americas
- Chicano Literature
- Puerto Rican Literature
- Latin American Literature
