= Daniel Olivas =

American author and attorney (born 1959)

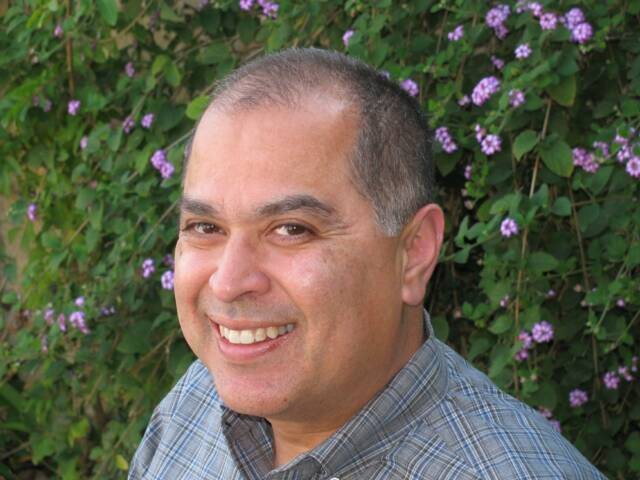
- Olivas in 2010
- Born: Los Angeles, California
- Education: Stanford University, University of California, Los Angeles, School of Law
- Occupations: Author, attorney
- Website: www.danielolivas.com

Daniel Anthony Olivas is an American author and attorney.

== Biography ==
Daniel Olivas was raised near downtown Los Angeles, the middle of five children and the grandson of Mexican immigrants. He attended St. Thomas the Apostle grammar school, and then Loyola High School. Olivas received his BA in English literature from Stanford University and Juris Doctor degree from the University of California, Los Angeles.

Olivas met fellow law student, Susan Formaker at UCLA and they married in 1986. They have one son.

Olivas has practiced law with the California Department of Justice as a deputy and supervising deputy attorney general, and as a senior assistant attorney general, since 1990. Prior to 1990, he was in private practice with the now-defunct Heller Ehrman LLP.

== Writing ==
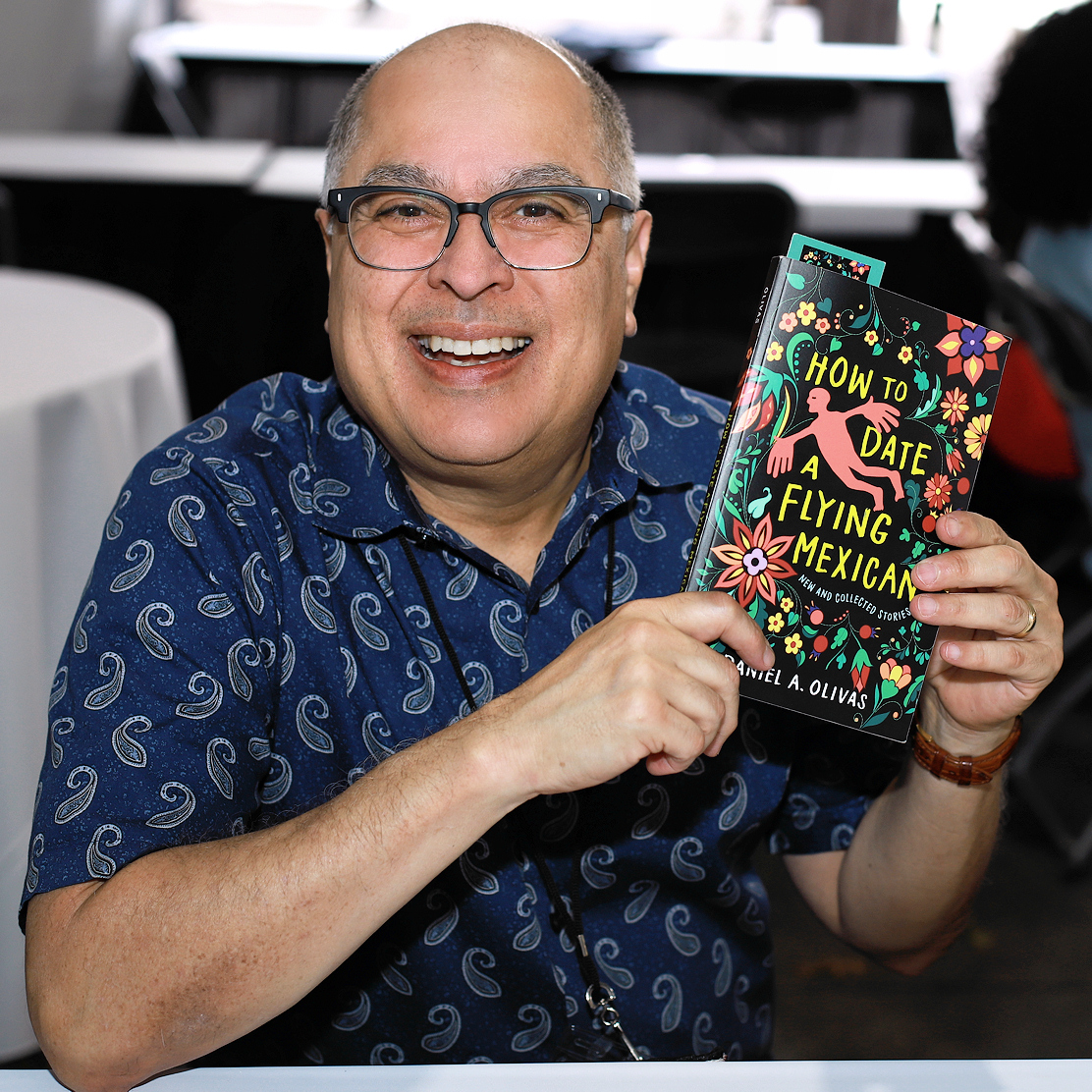
Olivas at the 2022 Texas Book Festival.

Before becoming a fiction writer, Olivas authored legal articles, essays and book reviews for the Los Angeles Daily Journal. He started writing fiction in 1998 with the publication of his first short story in the literary journal, RiversEdge published by the University of Texas-Pan American.

His first book was a novella, The Courtship of María Rivera Peña, which was published by a small and now-defunct Pennsylvania-based press, Silver Lake Publishing in 2000 and is now out of print. The novella is loosely based on Olivas's paternal grandparents' migration from Mexico to Los Angeles in the 1920s.

Three short-story collections followed in quick succession, each published by Bilingual Press, a publisher affiliated with Arizona State University. They are Assumption and Other Stories (2003), Devil Talk: Stories (2004) and Anywhere But L.A.: Stories (2009).

In September 2017, Olivas published another collection, The King of Lighting Fixtures (University of Arizona Press).

In February 2022, Olivas published the collection, How to Date a Flying Mexican: New and Collected Stories (University of Nevada Press). BuzzFeed offered a positive review observing, in part: "Throughout all of his stories, there are strong Chicano characters, who embody tales that range from the laugh-out-loud funny to the heartbreaking. A timely retrospective from an important voice in Latinx literature." Alta Journal's review said "Prompted by tragedy—the death of his father and the pandemic—Olivas revisits decades of writing to produce this collection of new and previously published stories. Olivas's work is surreal, dystopian, critical, and introspective, ultimately moving into contemporary political rhetoric." In a review published by the Los Angeles Review of Books, the novelist Michael Nava noted, in part: "This deeply textured, sensual collection more than accomplishes Olivas's self-proclaimed task of rendering the beauty and complexity of Mexican and Mexican American culture in its fabulist, folkloric stories."

In 2011, the University of Arizona Press published Olivas's first novel, The Book of Want. The novel is written in the magical realist tradition but also includes postmodern elements such as sections where characters are interviewed about being in the novel itself, text messages, and a short play.

On March 20, 2023, Forest Avenue Press announced the acquisition of Olivas's novel, Chicano Frankenstein, with a publication date in 2024, noting that the novel "addresses issues of belonging and assimilation through a modern retelling of the Mary Wollstonecraft Shelley classic." On November 3, 2023, the Boston Review published an excerpt from Chicano Frankenstein. On May 8, 2024, after the novel's publication, NPR's Code Switch podcast ran an interview with Olivas regarding his novel where he discussed the anti-immigrant political rhetoric of the 2022 midterm elections that inspired him to write the book.

On August 6, 2024, the University of Nevada Press published My Chicano Heart: New and Collected Stories of Love and Other Transgressions. The San Francisco Review observed: "While Olivas has been writing for a while, newcomers to his works will gain a profound understanding of Chicano and Mexican cultures and the pivotal role of love in each." Shelf Awareness opined: "Imaginative Olivas deftly jumps between realism, magical surrealism, the mysterious and fantastical, capturing indelible glimpses of longing and loss, cleaving betrayal and healing renewal."

Between 2003 and 2010, the Los Angeles Times published six of Olivas's children's stories. One of those stories, "Benjamin and the Word", was republished by Arte Público Press in 2005 as a bilingual picture book. The story revolves around a boy named Benjamin who is Chicano and Jewish and who suffers bigoted taunts on the schoolyard.

=== Work as editor ===
Olivas edited Latinos in Lotusland: An Anthology of Contemporary Southern California Literature (Bilingual Press, 2008), where he brought together sixty years of Los Angeles fiction by Latino writers. The volume collected some of the best-known Latino writers Luis Alberto Urrea, Helena María Viramontes, Luis Rodriguez, Kathleen Alcalá and John Rechy, and also introduced writers at the beginning of their careers Melinda Palacio, Manuel Muñoz, Salvador Plascencia and Reyna Grande.

In 2016, Tía Chucha Press released The Coiled Serpent: Poets Arising from the Cultural Quakes and Shifts of Los Angeles which Olivas co-edited with Neelanjana Banerjee and Ruben J. Rodriguez. The anthology includes a wide range of poetry by including writers Dana Gioia, Ruben Martinez, Wanda Coleman, Holly Prado.

In 2023, Olivas was named co-editor of the new book series from the University of Nevada Press, The New Oeste: Literatura Latinx of the American West in the 21st century. The co-editor is the poet, León Salvatierra.

=== Non-fiction ===
On June 1, 2014, San Diego State University Press published Olivas's first nonfiction book, Things We Do Not Talk About: Exploring Latino/a Literature through Essays and Interviews. The volume brings together essays that have appeared in The New York Times, La Bloga, Jewish Journal, California Lawyer, and other publications, that address topics from the Mexican-American experience to the Holocaust. The book also includes 28 interviews that Olivas conducted over the years with Latino/a writers including Daniel Alarcón, Gustavo Arellano, Richard Blanco, Sandra Cisneros, Héctor Tobar, Luis Alberto Urrea, Justin Torres, Reyna Grande, and Helena María Viramontes.

=== Poetry ===
In November 2017, Olivas published his first book of poems, Crossing the Border: Collected Poems (Pact Press).

=== Playwriting ===
Olivas wrote his first full-length play Waiting for Godínez in 2019. He explained that he was inspired both by Samuel Beckett's iconic Waiting for Godot and the absurd, anti-immigrant policies of the federal government. It was also selected for Playwrights' Arena's Summer Reading Series (2020), The Road Theatre's Twelfth Annual Summer Playwrights Festival (2021), the Garry Marshall Theatre's New Works Festival (2022), and was a semi-finalist in the 2021 Blue Ink Play Award sponsored by American Blues Theater. The play had its world premiere on April 5, 2024, in a Teatro Espejo production in Sacramento, California, directed by Devin Valdez. The play was published in book form by the University of New Mexico Press on September 2, 2025. Of this new print edition, the Latino Book Review said in a review, "Olivas takes his most audacious step yet: an absurdist tragicomedy that transplants Samuel Beckett’s Waiting for Godot into the terrain of U.S. immigration policy.... Olivas’s genius lies in how he allows humor to refract horror."

In 2020 Olivas was selected for Circle X Theatre Co.'s inaugural Evolving Playwrights Group to adapt his novel The Book of Want (University of Arizona Press, 2011). The play had a Zoom reading on June 21, 2021, which was directed by Daphnie Sicre.

Olivas's first live, staged play, Waiting, had its world premiere with Playwrights' Arena on July 24, 2021.

== Bibliography ==
=== Books ===
- Waiting for Godínez: A Tragicomedy in Two Acts (University of New Mexico Press, 2025)
- Chicano Frankenstein: A Novel (Forest Avenue Press, 2024)
- My Chicano Heart: New and Collected Stories of Love and Other Transgressions (University of Nevada Press, 2024)
- How to Date a Flying Mexican: New and Collected Stories (University of Nevada Press, 2022)
- The King of Lighting Fixtures: Stories (University of Arizona Press, 2017)
- Crossing the Border: Collected Poems (Pact Press, 2017)
- Things We Do Not Talk About: Exploring Latino/a Literature through Essays and Interviews (San Diego State University Press, 2014)
- The Book of Want: A Novel (University of Arizona Press, 2011)
- Anywhere But L.A.: Stories (Bilingual Press, 2009)
- Latinos in Lotusland (Bilingual Press, 2008)
- Devil Talk: Stories (Bilingual Press, 2004)
- Assumption and Other Stories (Bilingual Press, 2003)
- The Courtship of María Rivera Peña (Silver Lake Publishing, 2000)

=== Children's picture book ===
- Benjamin and the Word / Benjamin y la palabra (Arte Público Press, 2005)

=== Anthologies (contributing author) ===
- Latin American Shared Stories (Flame Tree, 2025)
- Los Muertos: Day of the Dead Fiction (Tinta Books, 2025)
- Both Sides: Stories from the Border (Polis Books, 2020)
- Speak & Speak Again (Pact Press, 2017)
- LA Fiction Anthology: Southland Stories by Southland Writers (Red Hen Press, 2016)
- Feast: Poetry and Recipes for a Full Seating at Dinner (Black Lawrence Press, 2015)
- New California Writing 2012 (Heyday Books, 2012)
- You Don't Have a Clue: Latino Mystery Stories for Teens (Arte Público Press, 2011)
- Hint Fiction: An Anthology of Stories in 25 Words or Fewer (W. W. Norton, 2010)
- Sudden Fiction Latino: Short-Short Stories from the United States and Latin America (W. W. Norton, 2010)
- Mamas and Papas: On the Sublime and Heartbreaking Art of Parenting (City Works Press, 2010)
- A Poet's Haggadah: Passover Through the Eyes of Poets (CreateSpace, 2008)
- Social Issues Firsthand: Hate Crimes (Thomson/Greenhaven, 2007)
- You Have Time for This: Contemporary American Short-Short Stories (Ooligan Press, 2007)
- Love to Mamá: A Tribute to Mothers (Lee & Low Books, 2001)
- Fantasmas: Supernatural Stories by Mexican American Writers (Bilingual Press, 2000)
- Nemeton: A Fables Anthology (Silver Lake Publishing, 2000)

=== Anthologies (editor) ===
- Latinos in Lotusland: An Anthology of Contemporary Southern California Literature (Bilingual Press, 2008)
- The Coiled Serpent: Poets Arising from the Cultural Quakes and Shifts of Los Angeles (Tia Chucha Press, 2016), co-editor

== Awards and honors ==
- International Latino Book Award, Bronze Medal in Science Fiction, Frankenstein Chicano (Spanish translation of Chicano Frankenstein).
- 2025 IBPA Book Award Silver Medal Winner in Latia/o/e Communities Category for Chicano Frankenstein (Forest Avenue Press, 2024).
- 2023 IPPY Awards Gold Medalist for Short Story Fiction for How to Date a Flying Mexican: New and Collected Stories (University of Nevada Press, 2022).
- Honorable Mention, Best Latino Focused Nonfiction Book, for Things We Do Not Talk About (San Diego State University Press, 2014), International Latino Book Awards (2015).
- Pushcart Prize nomination by Codex Journal for "Pluck" (2013).
- First place, Romantic Comedy, The Book of Want: A Novel (University of Arizona Press, 2011), Latino Books into Movies contest sponsored by Latino Literacy Now and the Latino Book & Family Festival, awarded at the Los Angeles Times Festival of Books (April 21, 2012).
- Silver Medal, Multicultural Adult Fiction, The Book of Want: A Novel (University of Arizona Press, 2011), 2012 Independent Publisher Book Awards.
- Semifinalist, The Book of Want: A Novel (University of Arizona Press, 2011), 2012 Virginia Commonwealth University Cabell First Novelist Award.
- Finalist, Best Popular Fiction – English, for The Book of Want: A Novel (University of Arizona Press, 2011), International Latino Book Awards (2012).
- Pushcart Prize nomination by University of Arizona Press for "How to Date a Flying Mexican" from the novel, The Book of Want (2011).
- Pushcart Prize nomination by Tertulia Magazine for "El Cucuy" (2009).
- Named one of the Top Ten Latino Authors to Watch for 2007 by LatinoStories.
- Co-Winner, First Place (Prose Category), "A Picture Worth 500 Words Contest" for short story, "Painting", sponsored by the literary journal, Tattoo Highway (2003).
- Honorable Mention, The Year's Best Fantasy and Horror (St. Martin's Press, 2003), for short story "Tezcatlipoca's Glory".
- Honorable Mention, The Year's Best Fantasy and Horror (St. Martin's Press, 2002), for short story "Devil Talk".
- Finalist, Willa Cather Fiction Contest sponsored by Helicon Nine Editions (2000), for Assumption and Other Stories (subsequently published by Bilingual Press, 2003).
- Honorable Mention, Eternity Best of the Web Awards (2000), for short story "The Horned Toad".
