= Monkey Hunting =

2003 novel by Cristina García

- Author: Cristina García
- Cover artist: Chip Kidd; Chris Jones (photo)
- Language: English
- Genre: Fiction novel
- Publisher: Alfred A. Knopf
- Publication date: April 15, 2003
- Publication place: United States
- Media type: Print (hardback & paperback)
- Pages: 272 pp
- ISBN: 978-0-375-41056-7
- OCLC: 50684622
- Dewey Decimal: 813/.54 21
- LC Class: PS3557.A66 M66 2003

Monkey Hunting is a 2003 novel by Cristina García.

The novel follows four generations of one family: Chen Pan, who leaves China in 1857 on the promise of success in Cuba only to find himself enslaved as an indentured worker; his Chinese granddaughter, Chen Fang, who is raised as a boy so that she can be educated (unbeknownst to her father, who has returned to Cuba as a doctor); and Chen Pan's great-grand-grandson Domingo, who moves with his father to the United States, where he enlists to fight in Vietnam.

== Characters ==
- Chen Pan: Chinese man who is tricked into indentured servitude in Cuba; after freeing himself, he becomes a successful businessman and learns to enjoy life in his new country
- Lucrecia: a young mulatto slave girl, rescued by nuns and purchased by Chen Pan; she eventually becomes his lover and they have children together; she brings together Spanish and African religious practices, and eventually adds Buddhism to the mix; last in life, she considers herself Chinese
- Lorenzo Chen: Chen Pan and Lucrecia's son; a successful doctor, he is the only child to express interest in China; on a visit there, he takes a wife and has daughters by her, the youngest of which (Chen Fang) is born after he returns to Cuba; he also takes a Cuban wife and through her becomes the grandfather of Domingo
- Chen Fang: Lorenzo's youngest daughter by his Chinese wife; because Lorenzo never sees her, her mother tells him that she is a boy so that she might be educated; as an adult, she is successful as a teacher of foreign children until Mao's regime stops Western education and she is imprisoned; her gender identity is a source of confusion to her, both because she is raised as a boy and because her Afro-Cuban lineage makes her taller than Chinese girls; she has a happy affair with Dauphine, but never recovers after Dauphine has to leave the country
- Dauphine
- Pipo Chen
- Domingo Chen
- Tham Thanh Lan

== Publication history ==
- 2003, USA, Knopf ISBN 978-0-375-41056-7, Pub date 15 April 2003, hardback and paperback

== External criticism ==
- "A 'Chino' in Cuba: Cristina García's Monkey Hunting" By: Xiomara Campilongo, IN: Ignacio López-Calvo, Alternative Orientalisms in Latin America and Beyond. Newcastle upon Tyne, England: Cambridge Scholars, 2007. pp. 113–23
- "Chinos y japoneses en América Latina: Karen Tei Yamashita, Cristina García y Anna Kazumi Stahl" By: Gustavo Geirola, Chasqui: Revista de Literatura Latinoamericana, 2005 Nov; 34 (2): 113-30.
- "La literatura cubanoamericana: Cristina García y su trilogía novelesca" By: Eliana Rivero, . IN: Laura P. Alonso Gallo and Fabio Murrieta; Guayaba Sweet: Literatura Cubana en Estados Unidos. Cádiz, Spain: Aduana Vieja, 2003. pp. 133–51 (book article)
- Reading Latinas: A Cultural Analysis of Beauty, Gender and Empowering Models for and by Latinas By: Emma R. García; Dissertation Abstracts International, Section A: The Humanities and Social Sciences, 2006 Feb; 66 (8): 2932. U of Michigan, 2005. (dissertation abstract)
