= Rafael C. Castillo =

American writer

Rafael C. Castillo is an American writer, who was the first editor of ViAztlan: an international journal of Arts and Letters established in San Antonio, Texas, in 1979. The journal was funded through the City of San Antonio and the culture-based arts organization Centro Cultural de Aztlan. A veteran freelance writer, Castillo authored articles germane to the Mexican-American community and established philosophy-based issues and supported international causes that promoted Mexican American arts and letters. He later served as contributing editor of The Saguaro,a literary journal published at the University of Arizona, Tucson. In 1985, Castillo visited Paris, France, and met briefly with David Appelfield, editor of FRANK, an international literary journal, and became its San Antonio correspondent. In 2001, Castillo was asked to serve on the editorial board of Puentes, an international bilingual journal based at Texas A&M University–Corpus Christi.

His writings have appeared in The Arizona Quarterly, Saguaro, Frank (Paris, France), Southwestern American Literature, English Journal, College English, South Texas Studies, English in Texas, Imagine, Puentes, ViAztlan, Caracol and other international literary quarterlies. He is included in Don Graham's Lone Star Literature (2003), an anthology of prominent Texas writers.

Castillo is the author of Distant Journeys (Bilingual Review Press/Arizona State University), which was published in 1991. The collection was nominated for the Before Columbus Award, the Texas Institute of Letters, and the Ernest Hemingway Award. His most recent addition to the literary canon is Aurora, a collection of fiction published in 2010 by Floricanto Press of California. His third collection of fiction is "The Language of Sparrows and Other Stories," published by Tiltwood Press of Texas, in August 2025. In June 2026, Tiltwood Press published his novel, "ViAztlan Redux".

In 1985, Castillo was selected as the first English faculty at Palo Alto College and the next year became its first chairperson. The college opened in 1985 and is located in the Southside of San Antonio. In 1987, he was awarded the first Palo Alto College Teaching Excellence Award ($2,000/laptop) voted at-large by the Faculty Senate, and the following year, the National Council of Teachers of English awarded him the English Journal Writing Award. In 1988, Castillo inaugurated and founded the student-centered Palo Alto Review, which later morphed into the broad-based academic journal The Palo Alto Review. In 1990, Castillo was asked to serve on the Editorial Board of Publications of NCTE, the National Council of Teachers of English. Castillo is listed in Who's Who in U.S. Writers, Editors, and Poets; Men of Achievement, and Who's Who among Scholars. In 2019, Oxford University Press published his essay "Chicano Literature" in Oxford Bibliographies. In 2023, Peter Lang International published his collection of literary essays, Dostoevsky on Guadalupe Street: Writings from the Edge.

A graduate of St. Mary's University (B.A.), the University of Texas at San Antonio (M.A.) and Capella University in Minnesota (PhD), Castillo was one of the early free-lance writers whose contributions opened the door for Hispanics in mainstream journalism. He was a board member of Gemini-Ink of San Antonio, a non-profit literary arts organization, and served on the San Antonio Express-News Community Board in 2004–2005. He served as Vice-President of Los Bexarenos Genealogical and Historical Society for 2008–2009, a Hispanic focus group. He was Director (2009–2010) for Los Bexarenos Genealogical and Historical Society in charge of programs. In 2010, Castillo was selected as one of four outstanding professors at Palo Alto College in the category of teaching excellence. In 2011, The Texas Association of Chicanos in Higher Education (TACHE) awarded him the Distinguished College Faculty Award at the 36th Annual Conference for "transforming Education" with an honorarium of $1,000 and Los Bexarenos Genealogical Society recognized him at their yearly banquet for his leadership and commitment to service as Chairman of the Board of Directors. In the summer of 2012, Castillo attended the Puente Institute at the University of California at Berkeley. Catch the Next, Inc. appointed him as Director of curriculum and instruction, where he excelled at creating programs and manuals for CTN-Puente. In 2017, CTN established their fellows program and Castillo joined other CTN fellows at Yale University, under the direction of Dr. Maria Martha Brumell, Associate Dean.

A brief literary biography of Castillo is included in The Greenwood Encyclopedia of Ethnic American Literature (2005) and the 1986–1987 Who's Who in U.S. Writers, Editors, and Poets. Other biographical listings include an entry for Castillo in the Dictionary of Literary Biography Volume 209, Gale Publishing, and papers listed at the University of Texas in the Nettie Lee Benson Latin American Collection. Catalogued as SRH-1.109 by Gilda Baeza-Ortego, Mexican American Studies Librarian, the papers are used by visiting researchers, biographers, and scholars. Currently, Castillo is a tenured professor of English at Palo Alto College in San Antonio, Texas.
