= Alfred Arteaga =

American Chicano writer

Alfred Arteaga (1950 – July 4, 2008) was a Mexican-American poet, writer, and scholar. He was noted as an important poet of the Chicano Movement, who also contributed to the foundations postcolonial and ethnic studies.

== Themes ==
He envisioned Chicano identity as a product of hybridity. For Arteaga, part of the Chicano worldview is seeing the world beyond binaries, or as speaking from spaces of overlapping nature that are more ambiguous than the nation state.

== Biography ==
Arteaga was born in East Los Angeles and raised in Whittier, California. He attended Monte Vista High School, which has since been converted to a Los Angeles County Sheriff's academy. He received a master of fine arts degree in creative writing from Columbia University in 1974, and a master's degree and doctorate in literature from the University of California, Santa Cruz, in 1984 and 1987, respectively. He won the Chicano Literary Prize in 1975.

From 1977 to 1987, Arteaga taught as an instructor of Mexican American Studies and English at San José City College. He served as an assistant professor of English at the University of Houston from 1987 to 1990. Arteaga originally joined the faculty of the University of California, Berkeley, in 1990 as an assistant professor of English and was tenured in the Department of Ethnic Studies in 1998. He became a Professor in 2008. His studies and teachings focused on the contributions of contemporary Chicano literature and music to American culture. He drew attention to the hybrid culture of Chicano writers by focusing on their hybrid use of language.

He is the recipient of a Rockefeller Fellowship (1993–94), a National Endowment for the Arts Creative Writing Fellowship in Poetry (1995), and the PEN Oakland/Josephine Miles Literary Award (1998).

== Bibliography ==
=== Poetry ===
- Cantos (Chusma House Publications, 1991) ISBN 0-9624536-2-5
- Love in the Time of Aftershocks (Chusma House and Moving Parts Press, 1998) ISBN 1-891823-00-0
- Red (Bilingual Review Press, 2000) ISBN 0-927534-94-0
- Frøzen Accident (Tia Chucha, 2006) ISBN 1-882688-32-5
- Xicancuicatl: Collected Poems (Wesleyan University Press, 2020) ISBN 0-819579-68-8

=== Creative Non-Fiction ===
- House with the Blue Bed (Mercury House, 1997) ISBN 1-56279-106-0

=== Essays ===
- An Other Tongue: Nation and Ethnicity in the Linguistic Borderlands (Duke University Press, 1994) ISBN 0-8223-1458-4
- Chicano Poetics: Heterotexts and Hybridities (Cambridge University Press, 1997) ISBN 0-521-57370-X

== See also ==
- List of Mexican American writers
