= Debra A. Castillo =

American scholar of comparative literature

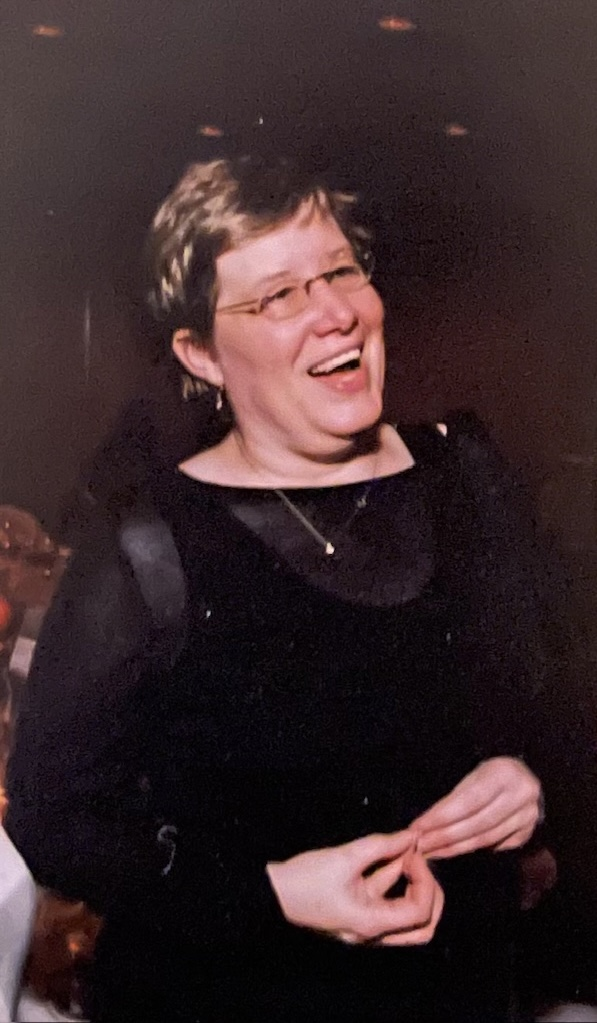
- Born: June 5, 1953
- Died: October 5, 2025 (aged 72)
- Title: Emerson Hinchliff Professor of Hispanic Studies, and Professor of Comparative Literature
- Board member of: President, Latin American Studies Association
- Awards: Stephen H. Weiss Presidential Fellowship

Academic background
- Education: University of Wisconsin-Stevens Point, University of Wisconsin-Milwaukee
- Thesis: "Librarians in Babel" (1982)
- Doctoral advisor: Melvin Friedman

Academic work
- Discipline: Latin American studies
- Institutions: Cornell University
- Notable works: Talking back: toward a Latin American feminist literary criticism (1992), The translated world: a postmodern tour of libraries in literature (1984)

Debra Ann Castillo (née Garsow; June 5, 1953 – October 5, 2025) was a scholar of Latin American and US Latino/a/x studies. She was Emerson Hinchliff Professor of Hispanic Studies and Professor of Comparative Literature at Cornell University, where she taught for forty years. She was the author, co-author, translator, or editor of over 20 books and around a hundred and fifty scholarly articles. She was past president of the international Latin American Studies Association (2014-15) and founder (alongside Cornell students) of Teatrotaller, a Cornell University and community theater group promoting theater in Spanish and Spanglish.

== Biography ==
Castillo was raised on a dairy farm in Wisconsin. She was the first in her family to attend college, graduating from the University of Wisconsin-Stevens Point in 1975. She was later recognized with a Distinguished Alumna award in 2003. She earned a Master of Arts in Spanish from the University of Wisconsin-Milwaukee in 1978 and then a PhD in English from the same institution in 1982 with the thesis "Librarians in Babel", which was supervised by Melvin Friedman. She then moved to Ithaca, where she taught at Cornell University, working her way up to become the Emerson Hinchliff Chair of Hispanic Studies. She also served as the director of the Cornell Migration Studies minor, Director of the Latino/a Studies Program (which she helped found), Director of the Latin American Studies Program, and Chair of the Romance Studies department. She served on over 130 PhD committees, the majority as Chair, in addition to numerous masters and undergraduate theses. In 1997 she was awarded the Stephen H. Weiss Presidential Fellowship, the university’s highest teaching award.

Castillo held numerous leadership positions in her fields throughout her career including as the President of the Latin American Studies Association; Co-founder of MexicanEAST; executive council of the Modern Language Association; Group leader of the Central New York Humanities Corridor; President of the Asociación de literatura femenina hispánica; Editor of the Latin American Literary Review (2016-23); Editor of Diacritics (1987-92) and served on dozens of journal and press editorial boards throughout her career. At the time of her death she was Editor of the “Genders in the Global South” at SUNY Press and Co-editor of the “Publicly engaged scholars” at Cornell University Press.

She supported the Latinx community at Cornell and within the local Ithaca community, founding the theater troupe Teatrotaller in 1993, which has presented work throughout the U.S. and abroad as well as ¡CULTURA! Ithaca in 2008 with Carolina Osorio Gil.

Following her death, Rialta Magazine described Castillo as one of the most recognized figures in cultural studies. Bolivian author Edmundo Paz Soldán described Castillo as "someone who taught the way without needing to let you know that she was teaching you" ("alguien que enseñaba el camino sin necesidad de hacerte saber que te estaba enseñando").

== Research ==
In her research, Castillo specialized in contemporary narrative from the Spanish-speaking world (including the United States), gender studies, cultural theory, and theater. She was known for research on Latin American feminism, as one of the founding figures of US Mexicanism, as well as her work on border studies, migration studies and Latino literature and cultural studies. Some of her works include Talking Back: Toward a Latin American Feminist Literary Criticism (1992), Easy Women: Sex And Gender In Modern Mexican Fiction (1998), and Redreaming America: Toward a Bilingual American Culture (2004).

Talking Back (1992) was well received upon its release, with Castillo being praised for her contributions to Latin American feminist thought and literary criticism. Reviewing Talking Back in the journal Signs, Sara Castro-Klaren wrote that Castillo engages with "the need to construct a feminist literary criticism suitable to the historicity of the texts" which she studied, suggesting that her work helps to "propose a theoretical grid for reading texts authored by Latin American women". María Victoria García-Serrano, reviewing the book in Revista de Estudios Hispánicos, praised Castillo's insistence on "overcoming some outdated feminist foundations such as essentialism, universalism, ethnocentrism" and concluded that Castillo "presents her convictions with such erudition and firmness that it is difficult to disagree". Tamara Williams, reviewing the book in South Central Review, wrote that "Castillo posits a working model" of "a feminist literary criticism that takes into account the diverse tensions, intersections, and irreconcilable oppositions that shape the parameters of Latin American feminist writing". Williams praised the book as "an incisive, thorough, and comprehensive contribution to Latin American feminism that will prove vital reading to all those interested in the field". Reviewing Talking Back for Revista Hispánica Modern, Diane E. Marting summarised that the book was "a major treatise on the feminist literary practice(s) of recent Latin American and North American Latina prose writers" and described it as "highly recommended". Pilar Alvarez-Rubio, writing in Modern Fiction Studies, summarized that "Castillo's work sets an agenda for future Latin American feminist scholarship by pointing to the possibility of women-centered interpretations of literature".

Easy Women (1998) was similarly well received. Claudia Schaefer, reviewing the book in Revista de Estudios Hispánicos, said that "Easy Women is not an easy read, but it is certainly a worthwhile one". Schaefer summarized that the book represented a "huge and important leap in the study of gender and sexuality in twentieth-century Mexico". Reviewing Easy Women in the journal Discourse, Carl Good described the book as a "groundbreaking new work" and wrote that "Castillo makes significant contributions to feminism and literary criticism" through the text.

Monika Kaup described Redreaming America (2005) as part of Castillo's "project of redrawing the map of the Americas by highlighting the blurring of the division between the English-speaking North and the Spanish-speaking South". Reviewing the book in Comparative American Studies, María Helena Rueda highlighted Castillo's attention to "identity as instrumental in nature" and her suggestion of the "need to regard identity as a notion conceived in an exchange between nations". Thomas Nulley-Valdés, writing in the Canadian Review of Comparative Literature, suggested that the book "seriously took up the claim that the United States constitutes a Latin American country".

As the author, co-author, translator, or editor of over 20 books and around a hundred and fifty scholarly articles, her scholarship spanned the Spanish-speaking world and Brazil. She collaborated across disciplines and with scholars outside of the United States.

== Teatrotaller ==
Castillo contributed to US Latinx and Latin American theater studies as a scholar and producer. Beginning in 1993, she advised Teatrotaller (Spanish for "Theater-workshop"). Founded in 1993 by a group of students on the Cornell campus, Teatrotaller presents classical, contemporary and experimental plays of Hispanic origin to the local Cornell and Ithaca community and has performed throughout the USA, and in Europe, Latin America, the Middle East, and South Asia.

The productions have ranged from the Spanish comedy, "Yo tengo un tío en América" to the documentary play, "La mujer que cayó del cielo" (presented in Ithaca and Mexico); the collective creation project based on a field visit to Chiapas, "Kan Balaam"; the adaptation of Cristina Michaus' "Mujeres de Ciudad Juárez " to audiences in Ithaca and Quito, Ecuador; José Casas' "14" (including a visit by the playwright); the original rave play, "Adult Roy's Badland" (Ithaca and Bucharest); and the year-and-a-half long collaboration with the Chaepani arts collective in Kolkata to produce "Root Map" in Ithaca, Kolkata, El Paso, Texas, and the Almanzo Wilder historic homestead in collaboration with the Mohawk Nation and the Native North American Travelling College at Akwesasne on the USA-Canadian border. During and after the COVID Pandemic, Teatrotaller's focus shifted to Boalian, feminist, participant-led theater, culminating in the Mexican tour of Diamantina Rosa, and its English cousin (not translation) Pink Glitter, toured both in New York State and Mexico and talked about in the Latin American Theater Review article Pink Glitter: Activist Theatre against Violence (30). Teatrotaller was also proud to be an active participant in the PICS festival for the years prior to her passing, with original plays and scoring for the years 2021-2024.

== Community work ==
Castillo was known for her community work and activism. In 2008, she co-founded ¡CULTURA! Ithaca with Carolina Osorio Gil, a program to foster and share Latinx culture with the community through easily accessible, free or low-cost arts-based educational experiences. Through ¡CULTURA! Ithaca, she supported the organization of hundreds of events around handicrafts, music, theatre, storytelling, cooking, and dance as well as organizing film series, art shows, and many other special events. She was also heavily involved in the Tompkins County Latino Civic Association, from which ¡CULTURA! Ithaca ran. She was also a major supporter of No Más Lágrimas, which helps supply food and other basic needs to the local Ithaca community and collaborated on numerous local projects that focused on sharing Latin American and U.S. Latino/a/x culture with community members, including the April 2025 event, “We Are La Voz,” a month-long event focused on Latine artists.

== Personal ==
Castillo was previously married to Carlos Castillo-Chavez with whom she had two children.

== Selected publications (books) ==
- Castillo, D. A. (1984). The translated world: a postmodern tour of libraries in literature. Florida State University Press
- Castillo, D. A. (1992). Talking back: toward a Latin American feminist literary criticism. Cornell University Press.
- Castillo, D. A. (1998). Easy women: sex and gender in modern Mexican fiction. U of Minnesota Press.
- Castillo, D. A., & Dudley, M. J. (Eds.). (2000). Transforming Cultures in the Americas (Vol. 4). Latin American Studies Program, Cornell University.
- Castillo, D. A., & Dudley, M. J. (Eds.). (2000). Rethinking Feminisms in the Americas (Vol. 4). Latin American Studies Program, Cornell University.
- Soldán, E. P., & Castillo, D. A. (Eds.). (2001). Latin American Literature and Mass Media (Vol. 2161). Psychology Press.
- Castillo, D. A., & Córdoba, M. S. T. (2002). Border Women: Writing from la frontera (Vol. 9). University of Minnesota Press.
- Castillo, D. A. (2004). Re-dreaming America: Toward a Bilingual Understanding of American Literature. State University of New York Press
- Castillo, D. A., & Panjabi, K. (Eds.). (2011). Cartographies of Affect: Across Borders in South Asia and the Americas. Worldview Publications.
- Henseler, C., & Castillo, D. A. (2012). Hybrid Storyspaces: Redefining the Critical Enterprise in Twenty-First Century Hispanic Literature. University of Minessota Press.
- Castillo, D., & Day, S. (Eds.). (2014). Mexican Public Intellectuals. Springer.
- Castillo, D. A., & Lema-Hincapié, A. (2015). Despite All Adversities: Spanish-American Queer Cinema. State University of New York Press
- Puri, S., & Castillo, D. A. (Eds.). (2016). Theorizing Fieldwork in the Humanities: Methods, Reflections, and Approaches to the Global South. Springer.
- Chakraborty, D., Castillo, D. A., & Panjabi, K. (Eds.). (2022). Centering Borders in Latin American and South Asian Contexts: Aesthetics and Politics of Cultural Production. Taylor & Francis.
- Banerjee, A., & Castillo, D. A. (Eds.). (2020). South of the future: marketing care and speculating life in South Asia and the Americas. State University of New York Press.
- Bartel, A. S., & Castillo, D. A. (2022). The Scholar as Human: Research and Teaching for Public Impact. Cornell University Press.
- Szurmuk, M., & Castillo, D. A. (Eds.). (2022). Latin American Literature in Transition 1980–2018: Volume 5. Cambridge University Press.
- Planas, M. C., & Castillo, D. A. (Eds.). (2023). Scholars in COVID Times. Cornell University Press.

=== As translator ===
- Campbell, F. (1995). Tijuana: Stories on the border. University of California Press.
