= Reyna Grande =

Mexican author (born 1975)

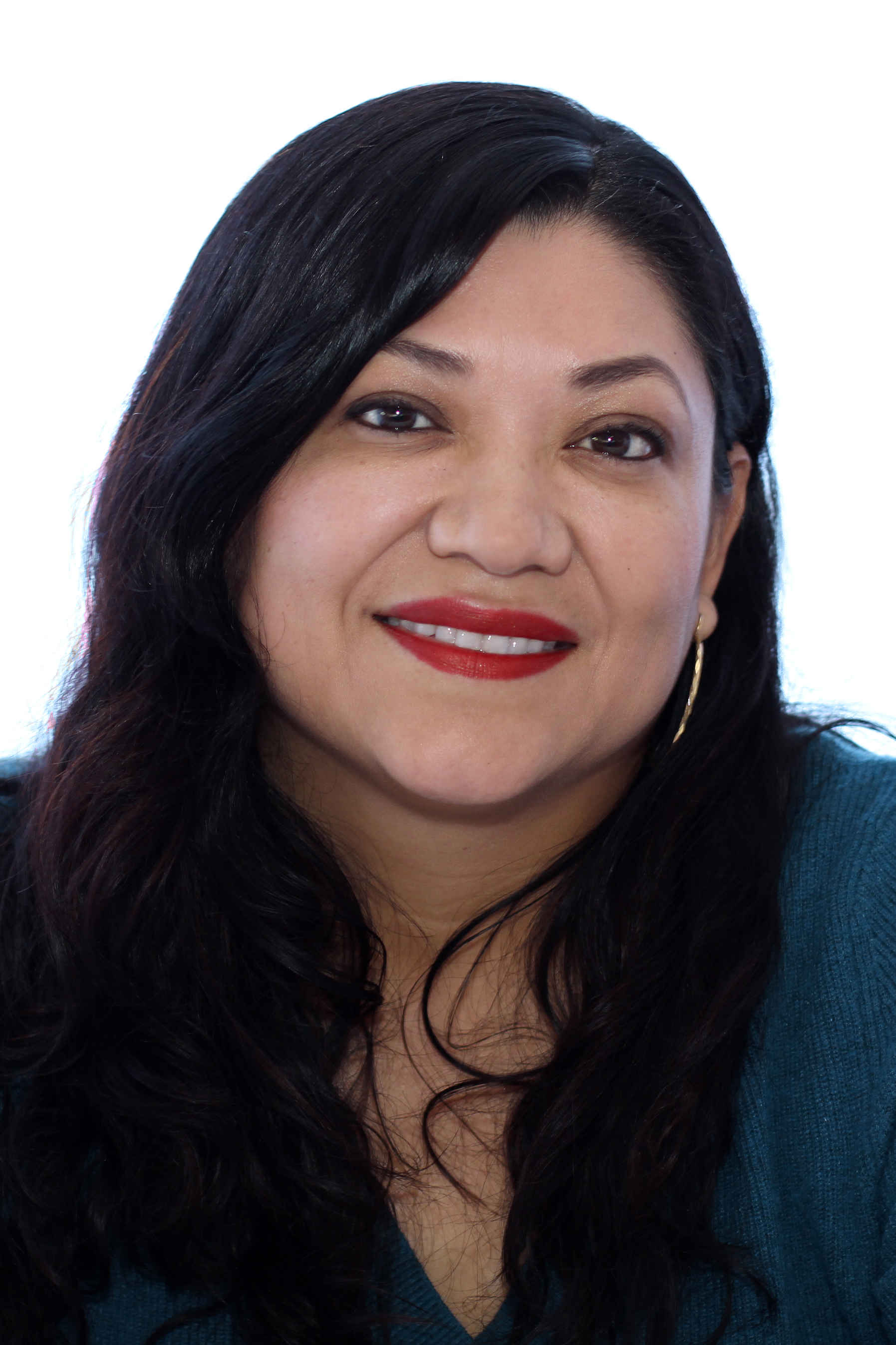
- Grande at the 2018 Texas Book Festival.
- Born: September 7, 1975 (age 51); Iguala, Guerrero, Mexico
- Education: University of California, Santa Cruz (BA); Antioch University (MFA)
- Occupation: Author
- Writing career
- Notable works: Across a Hundred Mountains; Dancing with Butterflies; The Distance Between Us; A Dream Called Home
- Website: https://reynagrande.com/

Reyna Grande (born 7 September 1975, Iguala, Guerrero, Mexico) is a Mexican-American author.

== Biography ==
Grande grew up in poverty with her two siblings in Iguala, Guerrero. When she was two years old, her father moved to the U.S. to earn money to build a house in Iguala but wasn't successful. He called for Grande's mother, who left Grande and her siblings with their paternal grandmother. Her father later returned to take her eldest sibling to the United States, but Grande and her other siblings wanted to go as well. Thus, Grande traveled to the U.S. as an undocumented child immigrant via an illegal border crossing at the age of about 9. She went on to become the first in her family to obtain a college degree.

Grande attended Pasadena City College and later transferred to University of California, Santa Cruz, where she obtained a B.A. degree in literature/creative writing. She later received her M.F.A. in creative writing from Antioch University. She has been honored with an American Book Award, the El Premio Aztlan Literary Award, the Luis Leal Award for Distinction in Chicano/Latino Literature, the California Latino Spirit Award, and most recently, the Barnes and Noble Writers for Writers Award from Poets & Writers.

Grande is a member of the prestigious Macondo Writers Workshop, the workshop founded by Sandra Cisneros. She has taught creative writing at UCLA Extension's Writer's Program, at VONA (Voices of Our Nation's Arts), the Latino Writer's Conference, Under the Volcano, and more.

== Work ==
Grande's first novel, Across a Hundred Mountains. draws heavily on her own experiences growing up in Mexico and as an undocumented immigrant in the U.S. The book was selected by a number of common read programs.

Grande's second novel, Dancing with Butterflies (Washington Square Press, 2009), was published to critical acclaim. An excerpt of Dancing with Butterflies was published in 2008 as a short story, titled "Adriana," in Latinos in Lotusland: An Anthology of Contemporary Southern California Literature (Bilingual Press), edited by Daniel Olivas.

In 2012, Atria Books published Grande's memoir, The Distance Between Us, a novel about the true and raw difficulties that migrants face when going to a new country without being able to understand the language. It is described as, a coming-of-age story about her life before and after coming to the U.S. as an undocumented child immigrant. In an interview published by the Los Angeles Review of Books on 6 December 2012, Grande explained why she decided to part from fiction to tell her story:

Even though my novels are very personal, and the material I write about is drawn from my own experience, they are fictional stories. After I completed my second novel, I wanted to write the real story about my life, before and after illegally immigrating to the US from Mexico. I wanted to shed light on the complexities of immigration and how immigration affected my entire family in both positive and negative ways.

The Distance Between Us was a finalist for the National Book Critics Circle Award (autobiography category). In 2016, Aladdin, a division of Simon and Schuster, republished the memoir as a young readers adaptation for ages 10–14. As with Across a Hundred Mountains, The Distance Between Us has been selected for a number of common read programs such as the 2018 Keker First Year Common Read at UNC Greensboro, Rochester Reads 2018, MacReads 2018 at Linfield College, the One Book/One Michiana 2018, All Henrico Reads 2018, Notre Dame Academy Common Reader 2017, the CityRead Book 2017 in Brentwood, CA, Timberland Reads Together 2017 in Washington, the 2017 One Book, One Canyon in Telluride, CO, the 2017 Estes Park One Book, One Valley, the 2017 Cal Poly Pomona Common Read, the 2017 Northern Kentucky University First Year Experience, the 2017 Avila University First Year Experience, the 2017 Marist College Common Read, the 2017 Cal State University, Monterey Bay Common Reading Experience, the 2016 One Book/One Community in Saginaw, MI, the 2016 Colorado Mountain College Common Reader Selection, the 2016 Camarillo Reads Selection in Camarillo, CA, the 2015 One Book/One Villanova at Villanova University, PA, the 2015 Sandy Springs Reads selection in Sandy Springs, GA, the 2015 Los Angeles City College Book Program Selection, CA, the 2015 Mount San Jacinto College Common Read Selection, the 2015 Read 2 Succeed Selection at Norco College, the 2015 Roswell Reads Selection in Roswell, GA, 2015 One Book/One Leyden selection at Leyden High School, IL, the 2014 One Maryland, One Book, the 2014 One Community, One Book selection from the U of Iowa Center for Human Rights, the 2014 Santa Rosa Junior College Reads, the 2014 One Book, One Community at San Juan College, the 2014 Rolling Meadows High School Summer Reading Program, the 2014-15 “Book in Common” at Butte College/Chico State University, the Grand Valley State University 2013 “Common Reading” selection, the California State University-Los Angeles “First Year Experience” Selection, the 2014 Goshen College, “First Year Experience” Selection.

In October 2018, the much-anticipated sequel, A Dream Called Home, was released by Atria, earning a starred review from Publishers Weekly. “This uplifting story of fortitude and resilience looks deeply into the complexities of immigration and one woman’s struggle to adapt and thrive in America." People Magazine said of the book, “The emotional and practical challenges for a young immigrant are on full display in Grande’ s evocative, inspiring memoir.”

== Awards ==
- 2006 Premio Aztlán Literary Award — for Across a Hundred Mountains
- 2007 American Book Award — for Across a Hundred Mountains
- 2010 International Book Award — for Dancing with Butterflies
- 2012 Finalist for the National Book Critics Circle Award - for The Distance Between Us
- 2015 Luis Leal Award for Distinction in Chicano/Latino Literature
- 2016 Eureka! Honor Awards from the California Reading Association--for The Distance Between Us, young reader's edition
- 2017 Honor Book Award for the Américas Award for Children’s and Young Adult Literature - for The Distance Between Us, young reader's edition
- International Literacy Association Children’s Book Award 2017 - for The Distance Between Us, young reader's version
- 2021 California Latino Spirit Award from the California Latino Caucus
- 2023 Barnes & Noble Writers for Writers Award from Poets & Writers
- 2023 Audies Award, Finalist in Fiction, Across a Hundred Mountains audiobook
- 2023 Texas Institute of Letters, Jesse H. Jones Award for Best Book of Fiction Finalist, A Ballad of Love and Glory

== Bibliography ==
- Across a Hundred Mountains (Atria, 2006) — selected:
  - 2007 Eastern Connecticut "One Book/One Region"
  - 2010 Watsonville, California On the Same Page
  - 2012 Owensboro Community & Technical College Common Read
  - 2013-14 Ramona Convent Secondary School "One School/One Community"
  - 2016 Woodland Reads selection, Woodland, CA
- Dancing with Butterflies (Washington Square Press, 2009)
- The Distance Between Us (Atria Books, 2012) — selected:
  - 2013 Grand Valley State University "Community Read"
  - 2014 One Maryland, One Book
  - 2014 University of Iowa Center for Human Rights One Community, One Book
  - 2014 Santa Rosa Junior College Reads
  - 2014 San Juan College One Book, One Community
  - 2014 Rolling Meadows High School Summer Reading Program
  - 2014 California State University, Los Angeles "First Year Experience"
  - 2014 Goshen College "First Year Experience" Selection
  - 2014 Monroe County, Michigan's One Book/One Community
  - 2014-15 Butte College "Book in Common"
  - 2014-15 Chico State University "Book in Common"
  - 2015 Sandy Springs Reads Sandy Springs, GA
  - 2016 Camarillo Reads Camarillo, CA
  - 2016 Colorado Mountain College Common Reader Selection
  - 2016 One Book/One Community, Saginaw, MI
  - 2017 Cal Poly Pomona "First Year Experience" Common Read
  - Notre Dame Academy Common Reader 2017, KY
  - CityRead Book 2017, Brentwood, CA
  - Timberland Reads Together 2017, WA,
  - 2017 One Book, One Canyon, Telluride, CO,+
  - 2017 Estes Park One Book, One Valley
  - 2017 Northern Kentucky University First Year Experience
  - 2017 Avila University First Year Experience
  - 2017 Marist College Common Read
  - 2017 Cal State University, Monterey Bay Common Reading Experience
  - 2018 Keker First Year Common Read, UNC Greensboro
  - Rochester Reads 2018
  - MacReads 2018 at Linfield College
  - One Book/One Michiana 2018
  - All Henrico Reads 2018
- A Dream Called Home: A Memoir, (Simon and Schuster, 2018) ISBN 9781501171437
  - 2018 Santa Rosa Junior College - Required reading for Hist 21.
  - 2020-2021 Common Reading Selection Florida International University
  - 2020-2021 Common Reading Selection Concordia University, TX
  - 2020 Las Positas College Campus Wide Read Selection, CA
  - 2021 One Book Project Selection–CSU Bakersfield/ Kern County, CA
  - 2021-2022 San Juan College One Book/One Community Selection, NM
  - 2021 One Campus/One Book Club, Palo Verde College, CA
  - 2021 Entering Student Experience, University of Texas, El Paso
  - 2022 Silicon Valley Reads Selection, CA
  - 2022 California State University Channel Islands Common Read
  - 2023 One Book Yuma, AZ
- A Ballad of Love and Glory (Atria, 2022)
- Somewhere We Are Human:Authentic Stories on Migration, Survival, and New Beginnings (HarperVia, 2022)
