= Cristina García (novelist) =

American novelist and playwright (born 1958)

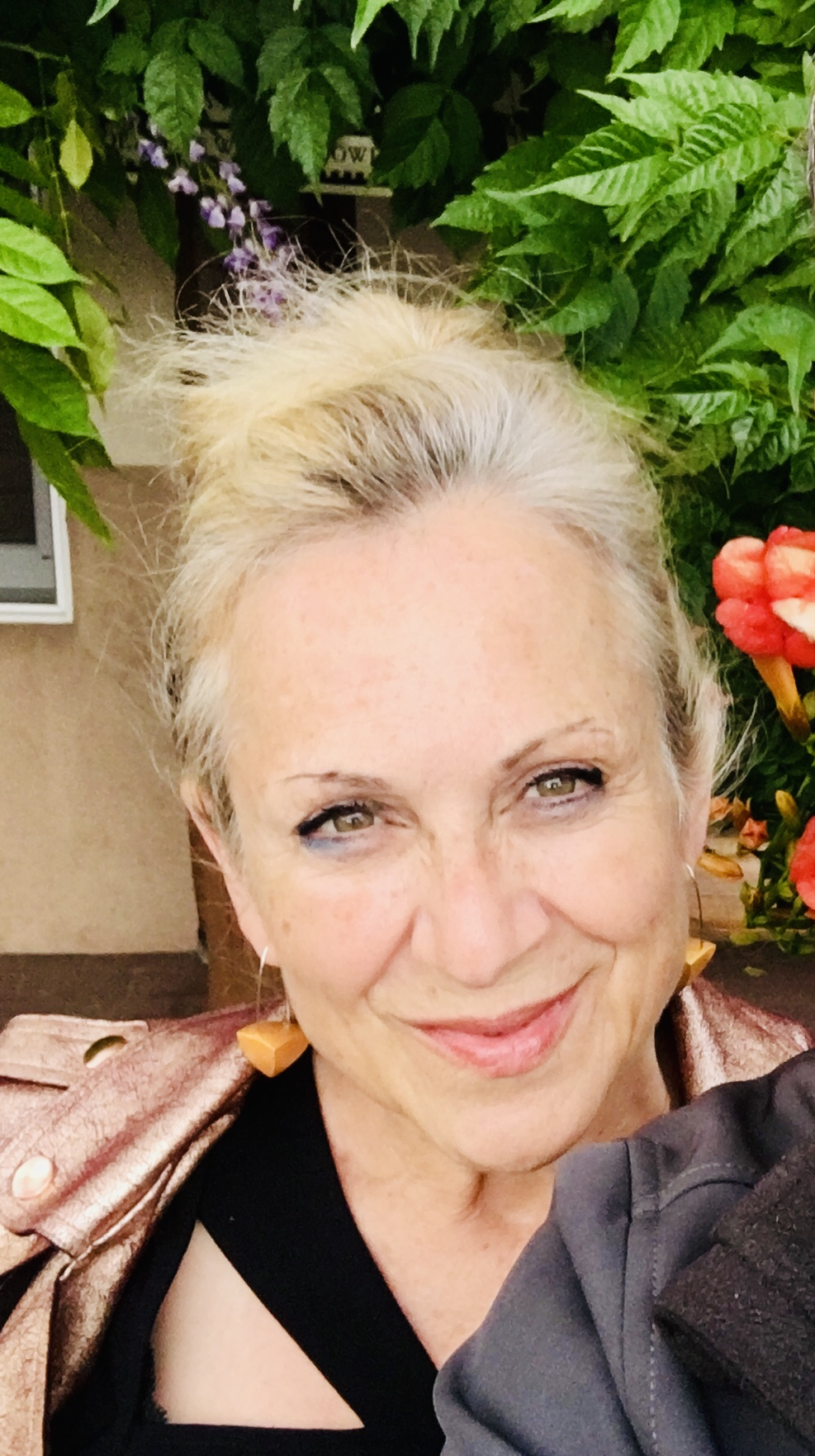
- Garcia in 2023
- Born: July 4, 1958 (age 68); Havana, Cuba
- Occupations: Novelist, playwright
- Writing career
- Notable work: Dreaming in Cuban
- Notable awards: National Book Award nomination
- Website: cristinagarcianovelist.com

Cristina García (born July 4, 1958) is a Cuban-born American novelist and playwright. Her first novel, Dreaming in Cuban (1992), was a finalist for the National Book Award. She has since published her novels The Agüero Sisters (1997) and Monkey Hunting (2003), and has edited books of Cuban and other Latin American literature. Her other novels include, A Handbook to Luck (2007); The Lady Matador's Hotel (2010); King of Cuba (2013); Here in Berlin (2017); and Vanishing Maps (2023).

Garcia has taught at universities nationwide, including UCLA; UC Riverside; Mills College; University of San Francisco; University of Nevada, Las Vegas; University of Texas-Austin; and Texas State University-San Marcos, where she was the 2012–2014 University Chair in Creative Writing. García's novels explore the memories, histories, and cultural rituals of her Cuban heritage and that of the diaspora in the United States and globally.

== Biography ==
García was born in Havana to Cuban parents, Francisco M. Garcia and Esperanza Lois. In 1961, when she was two years old, her family was among the first wave of people to flee Cuba after Fidel Castro came to power. They moved to New York City, where she was raised in Queens, and Brooklyn Heights. She earned a bachelor's degree in political science from Barnard College (1979) and a master's degree in international relations from the Johns Hopkins University School of Advanced International Studies (1981). She has been a Guggenheim Fellow, a Hodder Fellow at Princeton University, and a recipient of the Whiting Writers Award. She is on the editorial advisory board of Chiricú Journal: Latina/o Literatures, Arts, and Cultures. She has a daughter.

== Career ==
=== Journalism ===
García pursued a career in journalism following graduate school after having worked as a part-time "copy girl" with The New York Times. She obtained an intern position with The Boston Globe and a job as a reporter for the Knoxville Journal. In 1983 she was hired by Time magazine. Beginning there as a reporter/researcher, she became the publication's San Francisco correspondent in 1985, and its bureau chief in Miami for Florida and the Caribbean region in 1987. In 1988 she was transferred to Los Angeles. She terminated her employment with Time in 1990 to write fiction.

=== Novels ===
Of García's first novel, Dreaming in Cuban, García said, "I surprised myself by how Cuban the book turned out to be. I don't remember growing up with a longing for Cuba, so I didn't realize how Cuban I was, how deep a sense I had of exile and longing." The book was nominated for the National Book Award.

Her second novel The Agüero Sisters (1997) won the Janet Heidiger Kafka Prize.

García has reported experiencing unease in relating to other Cubans—both with those still in Cuba and those in exile in Florida. Some question why she writes in English. Others take issue with her lack of engagement in anti-Castro causes. She has said she attempts to emphasize in her novels the fact that "there is no one Cuban exile." In 2007 she also said that she "wanted to break free of seeing the world largely through the eyes of Cubans or Cuban immigrants. After the first three novels—I think of them as a loose trilogy—I wanted to tackle a bigger canvas, more far-flung migrations, the fascinating work of constructing identity in an increasingly small and fractured world." At that time García described this "bigger canvas" as including "the entrapments and trappings of gender," partly because "it would be easy, and overly simplistic, to frame everything in terms of equality, or cultural limitations, or other vivid measurables. What's most interesting to me are the slow, internal, often largely unconscious processes that move people in unexpected directions, that reframe and refine their own notions of who they are, sexually and otherwise."

While García has expressed a desire to avoid overt and propagandistic politics the influence of her heritage is made clear when she discusses the symbolism and characters in her work. She has said, about the symbol of a tree, for example:

In Afro-Cuban culture, the ceiba tree is also sacred, a kind of maternal, healing figure to which offerings are made, petitions placed. So absolutely, for me trees do represent a crossroads, an opportunity for redemption and change. In Dreaming in Cuban, Pilar Puente has a transformative experience under an elm tree that leads to her returning to Cuba. Chen Pan, in Monkey Hunting, escapes the sugarcane plantation under the watchful protection of a ceiba tree…In A Handbook to Luck, Evaristo takes to living in trees as a young boy, to escape the violence of his stepfather. He stays there for years, first in a coral tree and then in a banyan. From his perches, he witnesses the greater violence of the civil war in El Salvador and speaks a peculiar poetry, born, in part, of his co-existence with trees.

"King of Cuba" is a darkly comic fictionalized portrait of Fidel Castro, an octogenarian exile, and a rabble of other Cuban voices who refuse to accept their power is ending.

== Plays ==
- King of Cuba (2018) -- adapted from her novel
- The Lady Matador's Hotel (2019) -- adapted from her novel
- Dreaming in Cuban (2022) -- adapted from her novel
- The Palacios Sisters (2023) -- Inspired by Chekhov's "Three Sisters"

== Works ==
- Dreaming in Cuban: A Novel (New York: Alfred A. Knopf, 1992) ISBN 978-0-345-38143-9
- Cars of Cuba, essay, with photographer Joshua Greene and creator D. D. Allen (New York: H.N. Abrams, 1995. ISBN 0-8109-2631-8)
- The Agüero Sisters (New York: Alfred A. Knopf, 1997. ISBN 0-679-45090-4)
- Monkey Hunting (New York: Alfred A. Knopf, 2003. ISBN 0-375-41056-2)
- Cubanisimo!: The Vintage Book of Contemporary Cuban Literature, editor and introduction (New York: Vintage Books, 2003. ISBN 0-385-72137-4)
- "Introduction" to Twenty Love Poems and a Song of Despair by Pablo Neruda [1924] (New York: Penguin Classics, 2004. ISBN 978-0142437704)
- Bordering Fires: The Vintage Book of Contemporary Mexican and Chicano/a Literature, editor and introduction (New York: Vintage Books, 2006. ISBN 1-4000-7718-4)
- A Handbook to Luck (New York: Alfred A. Knopf, 2007. ISBN 0-307-26436-X)
- The Lady Matador's Hotel: A Novel (Simon & Schuster, 2010. ISBN 1-4391-8174-8)
- King of Cuba: A Novel (Scribner, 2013) ISBN 978-1476725666
- Here In Berlin (Counterpoint, 2017) ISBN 978-1-61902-959-0
- Vanishing Maps (New York: Alfred A. Knopf, 2023) ISBN 978-0-593-46797-8

== Awards and honors ==
- Dreaming in Cuban a finalist for the 1992 National Book Award
- 1994 Guggenheim Award for fiction
- 1996 Whiting Writers Award for fiction
- 1997 Janet Heidiger Kafka Prize for The Agüero Sisters
- 2008 Northern California Book Award for Fiction for A Handbook to Luck

== See also ==
- List of Cuban American writers
- Cuban American literature
- List of Cuban Americans
