= Magali Cornier Michael =

Magali Cornier Michael is a literary scholar, Professor of English, former Chair of the English Department, and current Associate Dean of the McAnulty College and Graduate School of Liberal Arts at Duquesne University. She is also a co-founder and former co-director of the Women's and Gender Studies program at Duquesne.

Michael received her A.B. from the University of Georgia in 1982, and later her M.A. and Ph.D. from Emory University.

She is the author of multiple articles on contemporary fiction.

== Books ==
1. Feminism and the Postmodern Impulse: Post-World War II Fiction (1996, SUNY UP)
2. New Visions of Community in Contemporary American Fiction: Tan, Kingsolver, Castillo, Morrison (2006, Iowa UP)
3. "Narrative Innovation in 9/11 Fiction" (2014, Brill/Rodopi)
