= Dreaming in Cuban =

1992 novel by Cristina Garcia

- First edition published by Alfred A. Knopf
- Author: Cristina García
- Language: English
- Genre: Novel
- Publisher: Alfred A. Knopf
- Publication date: 1992
- Publication place: United States
- Media type: Print (Hardcover, Paperback)
- Pages: 245 pp
- ISBN: 0-679-40883-5

Dreaming in Cuban is the first novel written by author Cristina García, and was a finalist for the National Book Award. This novel moves between Cuba and the United States featuring three generations of a single family. The novel focuses particularly on the women—Celia del Pino, her daughters Lourdes and Felicia, and her granddaughter Pilar. While most of the novel is written in the third person, some sections are written in the first person and other sections are epistolary. The novel is not told in linear fashion; it moves between characters, places and times.

The novel's central themes include family relationships, exile, the divisiveness of politics, and memory. Cuban history and culture are important in the novel, including important historical events and the elements of Santería that appear throughout the novel.

== Plot summary ==
As a young woman living in Havana, Celia Almeida meets and falls in love with a married Spaniard named Gustavo. The two become lovers until Gustavo returns to Spain. After Gustavo leaves, Celia loses the will to live. Though she has no known medical condition, she wastes away (due to depression). While she is housebound Jorge del Pino courts her and persuades her to marry him. After their honeymoon, he leaves her at home with his mother and sister while he goes on long business trips, punishing her out of his jealousy for her past with Gustavo. His mother and sister are cruel to Celia, even more so after she becomes pregnant. By the time she gives birth to her daughter Lourdes, her mind has snapped.

Thus, for the first months of Lourdes’ life, Celia is in a mental institution and Jorge is the one who cares for Lourdes. When Celia is released, Jorge brings her to a new home on the edge of the ocean in Santa Teresa del Mar. Lourdes is distant from her mother and closely bonded to her father. A couple years later, a second daughter named Felicia is born. Finally, they have a son named Javier, who is born eight years after Felicia. Ideologically, Jorge and Celia are very different. Jorge prefers the American-friendly government, while Celia supports attempts at revolution.

Over the years, the three children grow up, and their lives take different paths. Lourdes attends the university and falls in love with a man named Rufino Puente, the son of a wealthy family. They are married in spite of his mother's disapproval. After Rufino and Lourdes are married, they live at the Puente family ranch. Eleven days after the Cuban revolution takes place, Lourdes gives birth to a daughter named Pilar. Two years later, Lourdes is pregnant with a second child. One day, she is thrown from her horse while riding frantically to return to the house, and it causes her to lose the child. Lourdes reaches the house just in time to find two soldiers holding Rufino at gunpoint. She scares the soldiers off, but the soldiers return later. They claim the Puente estate as property of the revolutionary government. Lourdes tries to resist, but one of the soldiers rapes her at knifepoint. Soon after, the Puente family flees to Miami. Lourdes finds life in Miami intolerable, and soon they drive north until they reach New York City, where they make their new life. Rufino does not fit in well, and he spends his time working on his inventions. It is Lourdes who supports the family, saving up enough money to purchase a bakery. She runs the bakery herself. Pilar grows up rebelling against her mother and feeling much closer to her father. She becomes a sort of stereotypical "teenage punk artist".

Felicia, the second oldest daughter, becomes the best friend of the daughter of a santería high priest at age six. From that time forward, santería has a presence in Felicia's life. She drops out of high school and drifts from job to job until she meets Hugo Villaverde. Felicia is enamored with him immediately, and they soon consummate their relationship. Felicia becomes pregnant as a result. Hugo vanishes for seven months before returning and marrying Felicia in a City Hall wedding. He becomes physically abusive almost immediately and then departs to sea the next day. Thus, Felicia is without her husband when she gives birth to her twin daughters, Luz and Milagro. Hugo continues to be a sporadic presence in their lives after that. He manages to impregnate Felicia again and give her syphilis. It is during Felicia's pregnancy that her lack of mental stability becomes apparent. She attempts to kill Hugo by dropping a burning rag onto his face while he is sleeping; Hugo wakes up just as she drops the rag on him and he flees, never to be seen again. She later gives birth to a son, who she names Ivanito. While the twins resent their mother, Ivanito is extremely close to her.

The youngest child of Jorge and Celia, Javier, has a talent for science and shares his mother's support of the revolution and El Líder. As a result of his rebellion against his father, Javier eventually leaves for Czechoslovakia without telling his parents. He goes on to become a professor of biochemistry and marries a Czech girl, having a daughter with her named Irinita.

When Jorge develops stomach cancer, he travels to New York for treatment, where he spends the last four years of his life. His health gradually fails and he is hospitalized. Over the course of her father's illness, Lourdes has a constant desire for food and sex.

When Jorge dies, his spirit leaves his body and appears to bid farewell to his wife. She glimpses him briefly, but she cannot understand his words. Felicia turns to santería to make peace with her father, but she becomes mentally unwell again. When Celia discovers Felicia's illness, she takes Luz and Milagro to her home, but Ivanito will not leave his mother. Eventually, Felicia's mental state deteriorates to the point where she tries to kill Ivanito and herself with drugged ice cream. The attempt fails. As a result, Felicia is sent to join a Cuban military brigade and Ivanito is sent to boarding school. Celia becomes a full devotee of the revolution and El Líder, performing a wide variety of tasks and becoming a local judge of the People's Court.

Meanwhile, in New York, Pilar discovers that her father is cheating on her mother. She tries to run away to Cuba, but she only makes it as far as Miami. She gets caught while seeking out one of her cousins for help. Her mother is called, and Pilar is made to return home to New York. Lourdes becomes an auxiliary policewoman. Her father's spirit begins speaking to her regularly. Eventually, Lourdes’ business becomes so successful that she buys a second bakery. She has Pilar paint a mural for the opening. Pilar, unbeknownst to her mother, paints a punk Statue of Liberty for the unveiling, but when the crowd disapproves, Lourdes defends her daughter's work.

In Cuba, Felicia meets and marries a man named Ernesto Brito, but he dies in a fire soon afterwards. Felicia blames El Líder for his death, though there is no evidence to support this belief. She descends into madness again, and then vanishes, losing her memory and identity for months. When she recovers herself, Felicia discovers that she has married a man named Otto. Whether or not his death was Felicia's fault is debatable. While on a ride, he stands up while Felicia performs oral sex. When the ride begins again, he falls over and lands on electrical wires and is electrocuted, but it is unclear as to exactly how he falls, and later in the story, Felicia says that she pushed him.

Meanwhile, the day after Felicia's disappearance, Javier returns home to his mother. Celia learns that his wife has left him and taken their daughter. In his heartbreak, Javier wastes away, just as Celia once did, until he vanishes to die. Felicia returns to Havana and fully embraces santería, becoming a priestess. She is still distanced from her mother and children, who do not come to see her. Gradually, Felicia's health fades for reasons unknown and she too dies.

In the U.S., Jorge's presence begins to fade from the world, and he goes to Lourdes to ask her to go to Cuba and apologize on his behalf and make amends with her mother. One day while Pilar is out in the city, she encounters a botánica (a store that sells the paraphernalia of santería). The proprietor instructs her in a ritual she must perform and gives her the items she needs. On her way home, Pilar is attacked by boys in the park. Pilar recovers herself and returns home to carry out her ritual, which reveals that she and her mother should go to Cuba.

Celia wanders out into the ocean at night after Felicia's burial, and she is found in the aftermath by a newly arrived Lourdes and Pilar. They care for her. Lourdes views Cuba with great dislike, but she becomes fond of her nephew Ivanito. Pilar listens to Celia's stories and paints her portrait many times. Lourdes finds herself unable to forgive her mother. She resolves to help Ivanito leave Cuba, taking him to join the defectors at the Peruvian embassy. Celia sends Pilar to find him, and though Pilar manages to do so, she tells her grandmother that she did not. After Pilar and Lourdes are gone, Celia walks into the ocean a final time.

== Important characters ==
=== Major characters ===
- Celia del Pino: She is the matriarch of the del Pino family: wife to Jorge; mother to Lourdes, Felicia, and Javier; grandmother to Pilar, Luz, Milagro, Ivanito and Irinita. She is a strong supporter of the revolution, socialism, and El Líder. She is a romantic, taking pleasure in piano music and poetry. She shares a connection with her granddaughter Pilar.
- Lourdes Puente: Lourdes is the eldest child of Celia and Jorge, the wife of Rufino, and the mother of Pilar. After beginning her exile in the U.S., Lourdes becomes an entrepreneur, owning her own bakery. She is a strong supporter of capitalism and U.S. patriotism, and she despises El Líder and what he has done to Cuba. She is invasive of Pilar's privacy, and she does not understand her daughter.
- Pilar Puente: Pilar is the daughter of Lourdes and Rufino, and the granddaughter of Celia and Jorge. She is an artist and a stereotypical punk teenager. Images and music are important to Pilar. She longs to return to Cuba to see her grandmother, but her political feelings are more ambivalent than those of her mother and grandmother. She is close to her father, and she shares a connection with her grandmother.
- Felicia del Pino: Felicia, a sweet person with kind eyes and a huge heart, is the second child of Celia and Jorge. She marries three times over the course of the novel, to the following men: Hugo Villaverde, Ernesto Brito, and Otto Cruz. Her three children—Luz, Milagro, and Ivanito—are the product of her marriage to Hugo Villaverde. Her best friend is Herminia Delgado. She has sporadic periods of mental illness. She is politically apathetic, but she strongly embraces santería, eventually becoming a priestess.
- Herminia Delgado: Herminia is the best friend of Felicia del Pino. She is the daughter of a high priest of santería and helps guide Felicia to the religion.
- Luz and Milagro Villaverde: Luz and Milagro are the twin daughters of Felicia and Hugo Villaverde, and they are the granddaughters of Celia and Jorge. They resent their mother due to her madness, and they secretly slip away to visit their father. They are closer to each other than they are to anyone else, and Luz generally speaks for the pair.
- Ivanito Villaverde: Ivanito is the youngest child of Felicia and Hugo Villaverde, and grandson of Celia and Jorge. He is extremely close to his mother, embracing her and accepting her strange ways until she attempts to kill him and later disappears. In her absence, he becomes quite lonely.

=== Minor characters ===
- Jorge del Pino: He is the patriarch of the del Pino family: husband to Celia; father to Lourdes, Felicia, and Javier; grandfather to Pilar, Luz, Milagro, and Ivanito. He is a supporter of the U.S., working for an American company and turning to America for treatment when he becomes ill. He is particularly close to his daughter Lourdes.
- Rufino Puente: Rufino is husband of Lourdes and the father of Pilar. In Cuba, he was a wealthy but humble rancher, but in the U.S., he is removed from his element. He perpetually begins various projects and inventions without economic success. He is close to Pilar.
- Javier del Pino: Javier is the third child of Celia and Jorge. He is closer to his mother, sharing her support for the revolution, socialism, and El Líder. His father is quite hard on him, and this eventually causes him to run off to Czechoslovakia in secret.

== Novel structure ==
Dreaming in Cuban is divided into three books. Each book consists of several chapters of narration and one or more chapters of letters written by Celia. The letters all were written prior to the timeline of the rest of the novel. Within each chapter, different sections may center on different characters. These are indicated by the appearance of the character's name along with the year prior to the section. The narration of the novel generally moves forward in time, but this is complicated by the frequent appearance of memories and the fact that the novel jumps back and forth between different locations and characters.

The novel is also written through several different styles of narration. The majority of the novel is told through a third-person omniscient narrator. This style of narration is used for sections of the novel centering on the older generations—Celia, Lourdes, and Felicia—as well as Ivanito's first section. First-person narration also appears, usually in connection with the youngest generation of the del Pino family. Pilar is the most frequent first-person narrator, but Ivanito and Luz (Felicia's children) also narrate sections in the first person. Additionally, Herminia, Felicia's best friend, narrates a section telling the story of Felicia's final days. Celia's first-person voice is also heard through the appearance of her letters which help to fill in gaps in the family's history.

== Reception ==
Dreaming in Cuban was nominated for the National Book Award for Fiction in 1992.

The book landed the 65th spot on the American Library Association's list of the one hundred most banned and challenged books in the United States between 2010 and 2019.
