= So Far from God =

1993 novel by Ana Castillo

- Author: Ana Castillo
- Published: 1993
- Publisher: W. W. Norton and Company
- ISBN: 0-393-03490-9

So Far from God is a novel written by Ana Castillo, first published in 1993 by W. W. Norton & Company. It is set in a town in New Mexico called Tome and revolves around the lives of Sofia and her four daughters: Esperanza, Fe, Caridad, and La Loca. The novel addresses themes such as rebellion, spirituality and gender.

Since the novel combines different styles of literature including poetry, folk literature, social and political commentaries, absurdist techniques and postmodern fragmentation, it is multi-generic and therefore cannot be classed with one specific genre.

== Plot ==
At the age of eighteen Sofia, who is oftentimes called Sofi, marries Domingo and has four daughters with him. Shortly after La Loca's birth, who is the youngest of the sisters, Sofia leaves Domingo after she notices that he gambles away the land she inherited from her father. Because of that Sofia has to raise her children on her own until he suddenly returns after twenty years of absence. In the course of the novel Sofia becomes the self-proclaimed mayor of Tome, the city in New Mexico where they all live. When she finds out that Domingo starts to gamble away her belongings again, she decides to get divorced from him. After La Loca's death she becomes the founder of M.O.M.A.S., an organization for the mothers of martyrs and saints.

The youngest daughter of Sofi La Loca is pronounced dead at the age of three, however she reawakens at her funeral claiming to have travelled to heaven, hell and purgatorial fire. From then on, she behaves differently by never leaving the house and being unable to stand the smell of other humans except for her mother. Furthermore, she gains healing powers after that incident. In her twenties she gets infected and dies of AIDS.

Fe leads a rather stereotypical life working in a bank until her fiancé suddenly leaves her. After that she starts screaming from nowhere and does not stop for a whole year. Once she mysteriously recovers from that she goes back to her job at the bank and eventually marries her cousin Casimiro. Because she desires to gain more money in order to be able to afford valuable household appliances, she later starts working at a company called Acme International. There she has to work with dangerous chemicals which cause her to suffer from cancer. That is why she later dies. Fe's (which means "faith" in Spanish") story is an allegory for the ways in which environmental racism and the American Dream harm Latina women.

After Caridad's husband is unfaithful to her, she starts drinking and having casual sex with strangers. One night she gets attacked, raped and abandoned half dead in the streets. After the doctors claimed to not be able to do any more for her, she lies in Sofi's house while her sister Fe is screaming. The same night Fe's screaming stops, Caridad is miraculously healed from her wounds and after that she is gifted with visions and healing powers too. To train her healing powers she is taught by doña Felicia. Later she falls in love with a woman called Esmeralda, whom she meets on a trip with doña Felicia and with whom she jumps off a mesa in the end with their bodies never being found.

Sofi's oldest daughter Esperanza is a TV journalist, who is sent to Saudi Arabia for work. There she goes missing and is pronounced dead by the military. After her death she frequently still visits her family in spirit form. Esperanza's ("hope" in Spanish) story is an allegory for how Latina women are killed in the name of colonialist and nationalist greed and violence.

== Character list ==
- Sofia: Sofia, who is oftentimes called Sofi, is married to Domingo and has four daughters. She always takes care of her daughters and works hard for a living, raising them all on her own. Later she experiences personal fulfillment by becoming the unofficial mayor of Tome and always seeks to help other people.
- Fe: Fe is one of Sofia's and Domingo's daughters. She wants to lead a stereotypical life with a husband, kids and a nice home. She works at a bank and later at Acme International and is married to her cousin Casimiro.
- La Loca: La Loca is the youngest of Sofia's and Domingo's daughters and is pronounced dead at the age of three. She reawakens at her funeral and after that has healing powers and an altered behavior. She never leaves her mother's house.
- Esperanza: Esperanza is the oldest and most emancipated of the four sisters. She works as a TV journalist and always seeks to bring her career forward.
- Caridad: Caridad is also one of Sofia's and Domingo's daughters. She is raped at the beginning of the novel, which causes her to gain healing powers during the healing process.
- Domingo: Domingo is Sofi's husband. He has no job and gambles away Sofi's belongings.
- Doña Felicia: Doña Felicia is Caridad's teacher and friend. She has healing powers.
- Esmeralda: Esmeralda is the woman Caridad falls in love with.
- Casimiro: Casimiro is Sofia's nephew and the cousin of her four daughters. He is married to Fe.
- Francisco: Francisco falls in love with Caridad and develops stalkerish behavior as he starts to follow her and watches her every night.
- Doctor Tolentino: Doctor Tolentino is the trusted physician of Sofia's family.
- Mrs. Doctor: Mrs. Doctor is Doctor Tolentino's wife.
- Rubén: Rubén is Esperanza's ex-boyfriend.
- Tom: Tom is Fe's ex-fiancé.

== Themes ==
So Far from God is part of the Latina feminist / womanist and queer canons for fiction. Every event in the book speaks to the family of women's efforts to create meaningful lives (or existence post death for La Loca and Esmeralda) outside of the confines of white supremacy, colonialism, capitalism, and machismo / patriarchy / misogyny. All of Sofi's daughters die in allegories that describe how various violent oppressive systems kill Latina women. Fe ("faith" in Spanish) is killed by environmental racism and capitalism due to her attempts to live the American Dream. Esperanza ("hope" in Spanish) is killed as a war correspondent and represents women killed in the name of colonialist and nationalist greed and violence. Caridad ("charity" in Spanish) is repeatedly abused and brutalized first by her machista boyfriend, and later by the chupacabra, all symbols of misogynistic violence. While she is eventually chased off a mesa, it is inferred that she escaped death by patriarchy in the end by tuning into her divine feminine powers for healing and loving women instead of men. La Loca ("crazy" in Spanish, essentially The Fool) dies when she is 3 years old and comes back to life, and so becomes a divine feminine foil to Jesus Christ who eschews all things related to traditional Catholicism. She has healing powers and is wonderful with animals, but is too fragile for much human contact. After the death of all her sisters, La Loca develops and dies of what is labeled AIDS, but is likely a spiritual illness from cumulative grief. She is regarded as a saint upon her death. La Loca's story is how the church and cummulative violence against Latine communities harms Latina women. Sofia, whose name means wisdom, is the lone survivor, and she reclaims her power to improve her life and the world by divorcing her husband, becoming mayor of the town, and founding MOMAS.

One of the most prominent themes in So Far from God is religion. The Catholic church is directly addressed and criticized in this novel for oppressing its female members by forcing them into stereotypical gender roles. That is why the female characters seek inclusion and freedom of action and thought within the Catholic church and want to escape this oppressive situation.

Two other themes that are tightly interwoven with the theme of religion are spirituality and culture. In the novel spiritual hybridity is presented particularly. Indigenous as well as Christian elements are combined and appreciated equally, which creates a notion of a rather untraditional church. One of the most prominent examples for that in So Far from God is Caridad's and Esmeralda's jump off the mesa. They both embody a mixture of spiritual and cultural traditions and values. By uniting them in their jump off the mesa they manage to create a whole new cultural and spiritual identity which speaks for a progressive change concerning culture and spirituality.

On the theme of progress there is not only the interlacing of the different religious and cultural beliefs, but also the desire of the female characters to escape the one-dimensional labels the society enforces on them. Especially Sofi seeks to create new roles for women by becoming the Mayor of Tome and founding M.O.M.A.S. Before that women could only take the role of wife or mother.

Connected to that is the theme of gender and stereotypes. The men in this novel are presented to have the stereotypical attitude of "machos" and seek to dominate the women in their lives. The most prominent examples for that are Domingo and Esperanza's ex-boyfriend Rubén. This displays cultural norms that associate women only with passivity and submission. However, the women in this novel do not stand for that and instead manage to triumph over these oppressive views. In a variety of ways, the female characters stand up for themselves and their rights. Sofia for example shows that by kicking Domingo out and getting divorced while Caridad and Esmeralda stand up against Domingo and his homophobic attitudes by jumping off the mesa. As the women in this novel have to resist domination every day in their lives, a feminist ideology is strongly noticeable, which makes the novel a feminist piece of literature.

Furthermore, sexuality is one of the most prominent themes in So Far from God. One of the most striking examples for that is La Loca, whose behavior leaves no hint at her sexuality. In the course of the novel she never has a sexual partner. Connected to her dislike for other people that could even suggest asexuality. Moreover, none of the heterosexual relationships in this novel seem to work, whereas the homosexual relationship between Caridad and Esmaerlda does work. That becomes especially clear in their unification during the jump. This casts a light on homosexuality and queerness, which is why the novel can be labeled as a queer text which critiques heterosexist normativity.

Another theme in this novel is the theme of rebellion. Not only the collective agency of the women in this novel, but also the association of different cultural and religious values and beliefs as well as the critique against heterosexist normativity make So Far from God a rebellious novel. Furthermore, the fact that the novel touches upon the subject of sexual abuse and sexuality is rebellious in itself as it is not common to talk about such things in Chicana culture. Moreover, La Loca's jeans boycott stands for political resistance. Rebellion is also shown in the style the novel is written in. The use of code switching, language and grammar does not tie in with the norms of the English language. That in addition to the character's constant struggle against cultural inequality, stereotypes and macho politics makes So Far from God a rebellious novel.

Other themes that are not explicitly mentioned above but can also be found in So Far from God are the supernatural, identity, individualism, nature, personal fulfillment, and death.
