= Richie Narvaez =

Nuyorican writer (born 1965)

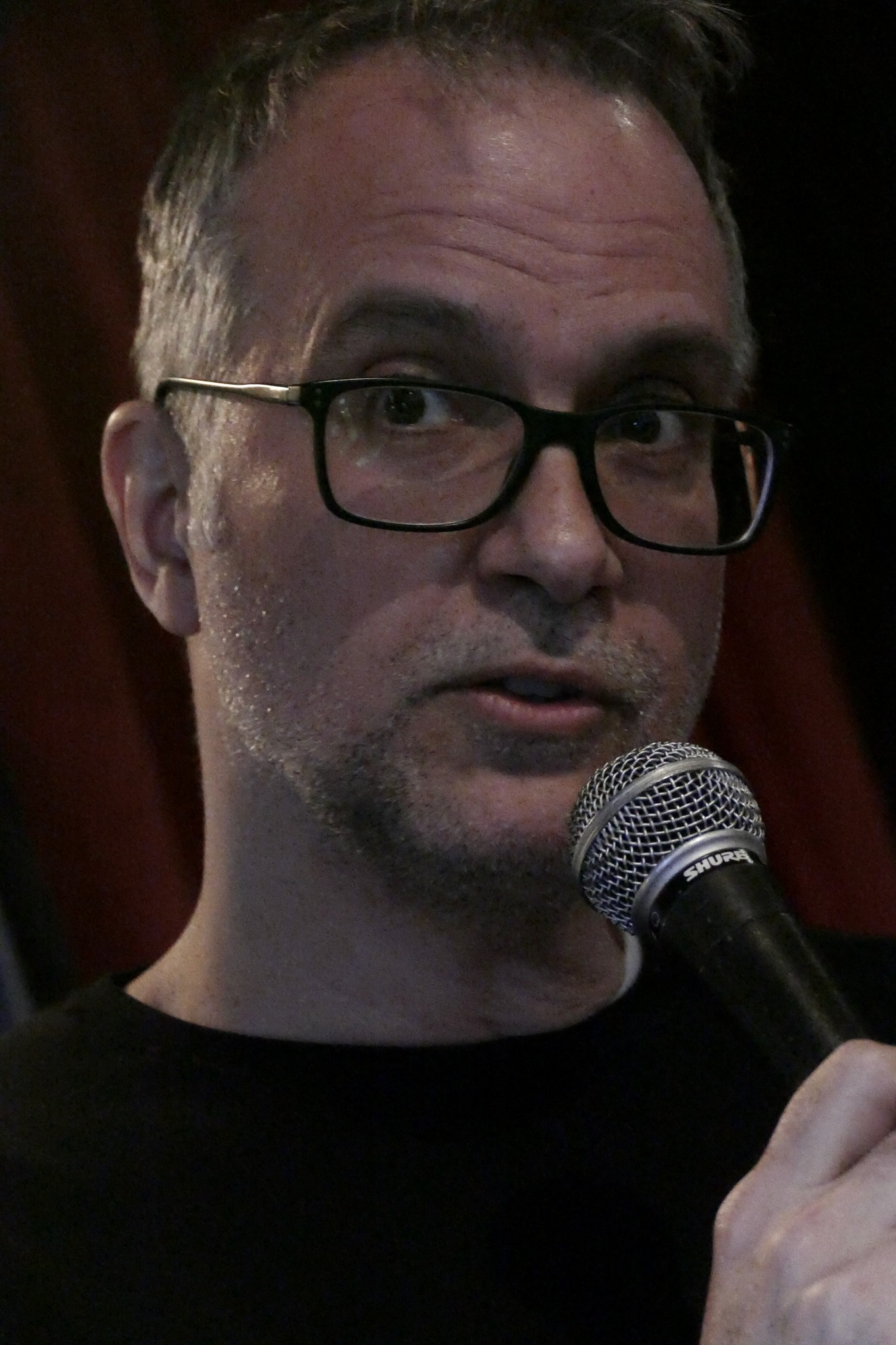
- Born: 1965 (age 60–61); Williamsburg, Brooklyn, New York, US
- Occupations: Writer, professor
- Awards: Agatha Award (2020); Anthony Award (2020)

Richie Narvaez (born 1965) is an American author and professor. In 2020, he won an Agatha Award and an Anthony Award for his novel Holly Hernandez and the Death of Disco. His work focuses on the Puerto Rican and Nuyorican experience.

== Early life and education ==
Narvaez's parents came to New York from Puerto Rico, and he was born and raised in Williamsburg, Brooklyn. He attended Brooklyn Technical High School. After graduating from the State University of New York at Stony Brook with a master's degree, he worked as a journalist for magazines such as Cable Guide and TV Guide. He currently teaches at the Fashion Institute of Technology in New York City and at Sarah Lawrence College.

== Career ==
Narvaez writes in multiple genres about Puerto Rico, urban culture, and social issues. He has a "penchant for placing complex and intriguing Latinx characters at the center of his work." His short stories have appeared in a number of magazines and anthologies, including Ellery Queen Mystery Magazine, Mississippi Review, Storyglossia, and Long Island Noir.

His first book, Roachkiller and Other Stories, a collection of short stories, was listed by Book Riot as one of the 100 Must-Read Works of Noir.

Narvaez's first novel Hipster Death Rattle explores gentrification and displacement in Williamsburg, Brooklyn. The book was optioned for CBS TV Studios as a possible TV series for the CW.

His second novel, Holly Hernandez and the Death of Disco, a young adult murder mystery, received positive reviews. The book received an Agatha Award for Best Children's/YA Book and an Anthony Award for Best Juvenile/Young Adult.

In 2020, Narvaez published another collection of short stories, Noiryorican. The title is a portmanteau of "noir" and "Nuyorican." The book was nominated for an Anthony Award for Best Anthology.

Narvaez's speculative fiction short story "Room for Rent", from the anthology Latinx Rising: An Anthology of Science Fiction and Fantasy, "artfully extrapolates out from past Puerto Rican migration into the future through an allegory involving migrant worker space aliens." In September 2020, LeVar Burton read the story on his podcast LeVar Burton Reads.

In 2022, he joined the advisory board of Cambridge University Press's Cambridge Elements in Crime Narratives, which publishes research from scholars and practitioners of crime writing.

== Bibliography ==
=== Novels ===
- Hipster Death Rattle (2019)
- Holly Hernandez and the Death of Disco (2020)

=== Short fiction ===
Collections

- Roachkiller and Other Stories (2012)
- Noiryorican (2020)

== Awards and honors ==
- 2013 Spinetingler Award for Best Anthology/Short Story Collection for Roachkiller and Other Stories
- 2015 Punchnel's Hybrid Flash Fiction Contest: "How to Write Flash Fiction"
- 2018 Named Artist in Residence at the Morris Park Library
- 2019 Best of 2019 Suspense Thriller by Suspense Magazine for Hipster Death Rattle
- 2020 Agatha Award for Holly Hernandez and the Death of Disco
- 2020 Anthony Award for Holly Hernandez and the Death of Disco
- 2021 Bronx Recognizes Its Own (BRIO) Award, from the Bronx Council on the Arts
- 2022 SUNY Chancellor's Award for Excellence in Adjunct Teaching
- 2024 Letras Boricuas Fellowship, from the Flamboyan Foundation
