= Roy F. Guzmán =

- Born: Roy Fernando Guzmán Rodriguez; June 28, 1987; San Juan, Puerto Rico
- Occupations: Composer, improviser, poet

Roy Fernando Guzmán Rodriguez (born June 28, 1987) is a composer of experimental, contemporary and algorithmic instrumental and electronic music, sound artist, improviser and poet born in San Juan, Puerto Rico.

His music is mainly exploratory and uses algorithmic procedures to create musical structures. The theme of chaos theory, abstracting sound scores to instrumental music, Musica A Lo Pobre, non duality, multipolarity and axiomatic music tends to be the major pivots in his work.

He has performed and presented works in The Hague and Amsterdam-The Netherlands, Bratislava-Slovakia, Budapest-Hungary, Vienna-Austria, Rhode Island, Boston, New York, California – USA, Banff-Canada, Chile, Argentina and Mexico.

He is currently active in the experimental music scene in Puerto Rico.
