= Bilingual Review =

Bilingual Review/Revista Bilingüe
- Discipline: Bilingual studies, Hispanic American literature
- Language: English, Spanish
- Edited by: Christian Faltis

Publication details
- History: 1974–present
- Publisher: OJS (United States)
- Frequency: Triannually
- Open access: Yes

Standard abbreviations
- ISO 4: Biling. Rev.

Indexing
- ISSN: 0094-5366
- LCCN: 74645066
- JSTOR: 00945366
- OCLC no.: 1084374

Links
- Journal homepage; Online access; Online archive

The Bilingual Review/La revista bilingüe is a triannual peer-reviewed open access academic and literary journal covering research on Spanish-English bilingualism, bilingual education, and Hispanic American literature. It was previously published by Bilingual Review Press, which is affiliated with the Hispanic Research Center at Arizona State University. The current publisher is Texas A&M International University.

The journal was established in 1974 by Gary D. Keller (City College of New York), who served as editor-in-chief until 2014. He was succeeded by Howard L. Smith (University of Texas at San Antonio). Since 2022, the Bilingual Review has been edited by Christian Faltis, Texas A&M International University, located in Laredo, Texas. Associate Editors are Dr. Lourdes Viloria, TAMIU, and Dr. Deborah Palmer, University of Colorado, Boulder.
