= Review: Literature and Arts of the Americas =

- Discipline: Literature, visual arts, performing arts in the Americas
- Language: English
- Edited by: Daniel Shapiro

Publication details
- History: 1968–present
- Publisher: Routledge
- Frequency: Biannually

Standard abbreviations
- ISO 4: Rev.: Lit. Arts Am.

Indexing
- ISSN: 0890-5762 (print); 1743-0666 (web)
- LCCN: 93645286
- OCLC no.: 166909882

Links
- Journal homepage; Online access; Online archive

Review: Literature and Arts of the Americas is a biannual peer-reviewed academic journal that was established in 1968. It covers contemporary Latin American, Caribbean, and Canadian writing in English and English translation as well as the visual and performing arts in the Americas. The journal is published by Routledge in association with The City College of New York, CUNY.

== Editors-in-chief ==
Editors-in-chief have included Ronald Christ, Alfred Mac Adam, and Doris Sommer. The current editor-in-chief is Daniel Shapiro.

== Abstracting and indexing ==
The journal is abstracted and indexed in the Arts & Humanities Citation Index, Current Contents/Arts & Humanities, EBSCO databases, Film Literature Index, Hispanic American Periodicals Index, MLA International Bibliography, RILM Abstracts of Music Literature, and Scopus.
