= Kathleen Alcalá =

American novelist (born 1954)

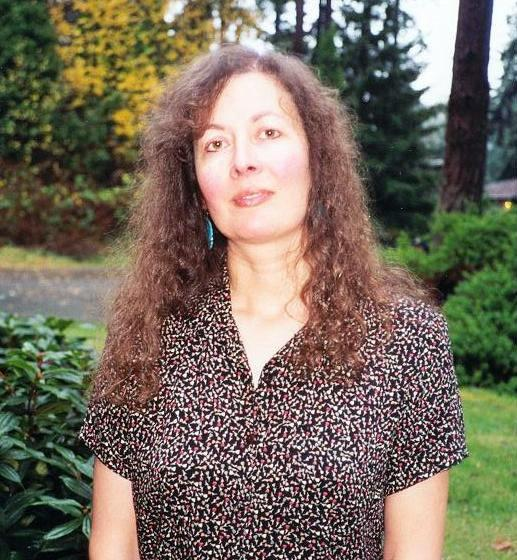
- Born: August 29, 1954 (age 72); Compton, California, U.S.

Kathleen Alcalá (born August 29, 1954) is the author of a short-story collection, three novels set in the American Southwest and nineteenth-century Mexico, and a collection of essays. She teaches creative writing at workshops and programs in Washington state and elsewhere, including Seattle University, the University of New Mexico and Richard Hugo House.

== Early life ==
Alcalá was born in Compton, California, in 1954 to Mexican parents. Her ancestry is from Northern Mexico, including Sonora and Chihuahua; some of her great-grandparents lived in Saltillo, Mexico. She was raised Protestant. She is a descendant of Sephardi conversos with roots in Nyer, France, and maintains a "relationship with Judaism". She applied for Spanish citizenship after the Spanish government began offering citizenship to Sephardi Jews expelled during the Spanish Inquisition. Her grandmother was Opata Indian and Irish Mexican.

== Career ==
Alcalá is also a co-founder of and contributing editor to The Raven Chronicles. A play based on her novel, Spirits of the Ordinary, was produced by The Miracle Theatre of Portland, Oregon. She served on the board of Richard Hugo House and the advisory boards of Con Tinta, Field’s End and the Centrum Writers Conference. She is the winner of several awards for her writing, including an Artist Trust/Washington State Arts Commission Fellowship in 2007.

Alcalá resides on Bainbridge Island, Washington.

== Works ==
- Mrs. Vargas and the Dead Naturalist (Calyx Books)
- Spirits of the Ordinary (Chronicle; Harvest Books)
- The Flower in the Skull (Chronicle; Harvest Books)
- Treasures in Heaven (Chronicle; Northwestern University Press)
- The Desert Remembers My Name: On Family and Writing (University of Arizona Press)
- The Deepest Roots: Finding Food and Community on a Pacific Northwest Island

== Bibliographical Resources ==
https://faculty.ucmerced.edu/mmartin-rodriguez/index_files/vhAlcalaKathleen.htm

== Critical reception ==
Charles de Lint, reviewing The Flower in the Skull, declared that "Alcalá is fast becoming one of my favourite writers," praising her work for the "richness [of her] characterization and settings."
