= Roy G. Guzmán =

Honduran-American poet

Roy G. Guzmán is a Honduran-American poet. They were born in Honduras and raised in Miami, FL. Their work has been featured in Poetry, Kenyon Review, Jet Fuel Review, and The Best American Poetry blog.

In 2017, Guzmán was a recipient of the Ruth Lilly and Dorothy Sargent Rosenberg Poetry Fellowship from the Poetry Foundation.

== Career ==
Guzmán has earned degrees from Dartmouth College, the University of Chicago, and the Honors College at Miami Dade College. They are the recipient of a 2016–2017 Minnesota State Arts Board grant, the 2016 Gesell Award for Excellence in Poetry, two Pushcart prize nominations, four Best of the Net nominations, and a 2015 Gesell Award honorable mention in fiction.

Guzmán lives in Minneapolis, where they are pursuing a PhD at the University of Minnesota.

== Publications ==
- Pulse/Pulso: In Remembrance of Orlando (co-editor), Damaged Goods Press, 2018.
- Catrachos, Graywolf Press, 2020.
