= Ingelin =

Ingelin (and its variant Ingelinn) is a feminine given name. Notable people with the name are as follows:

- Ingelin Angerborn (born 1966), Swedish writer
- Ingelin Killengreen (born 1947), Norwegian jurist
- Ingelinn Lossius-Skeie (born 1976), Norwegian politician
- Ingelin Noresjø (born 1976), Norwegian politician
