= Helena Eriksson =

Swedish poet

Helena Eriksson (born 1962) is a Swedish poet. Her sixth collection of poetry, Strata (2004), was published in English in 2014.

== Biography ==
Born in Nyköping, Eriksson was raised in the countryside. After graduating in philosophy and art at University of Gothenburg, she worked as an editor for the cultural journal Ord & Bild. She has also worked as a translator. In 1990, she completed her first lyrical collection, Byggnad åt mig (A building for me). Her dramatic expressionist poems, written in prose, evoke animal and human worlds which are also depicted in later works. Spott ur en änglamun (Spit from an angel's mouth, 1993) depicts a strange fairytale world seen through the eyes of little girls in red dresses who meet Bambi and Fox. She frequently introduces allusions to violence, desire and rupture, sometimes emphasized by the sensuous tactile effects of necklaces and clothing, as in Strata. As a literary translator, she has rendered into Swedish classic texts by women writers, including Anaïs Nin's House of Incest, Giannina Braschi's Empire of Dreams (poetry collection), Eileen Myles' Chelsea Girls, and United States of Banana, and Marguerite Duras' Le Navire Night.

== Works ==
- En byggnad åt mig – 1990. ISBN 9789100478940
- Spott ur en änglamun – 1993
- Mark – 1996
- Tholos – 1998
- Skäran – 2001
- Strata – 2004 (in English 2014)
- De, bara – 2008
- Logiska undersökningar – 2009
- Mellan eller En annan närhet – 2011
- Täthetsteoremet – 2012
- Kore på Starbucks – 2021 ISBN 9789100186920

== Awards ==
Eriksson has won several awards including the Swedish Radio Poetry Prize (Sveriges Radios Lyrikpris) in 2008 and the Swedish Academy's Dobloug Prize in 2009. She won the 2019 Swedish Academy's prize for her literary translation of Eileen Myles's works.
