= Stealing the Language: The Emergence of Women's Poetry in America =

1986 review of women's poetry by Alicia Suskin Ostriker

- Title page for, Stealing the Language: The Emergence of Women's Poetry in America (1986)
- Author: Alicia Suskin Ostriker
- Publication date: 1986

Stealing the Language: The Emergence of Women's Poetry in America by Alicia Suskin Ostriker is a comprehensive review, published in 1986, of women's poetry which shaped the feminist movement after the 1960s. The critical work illustrates a struggle that women poets faced in their road to self-expression. Ostriker, who received her literary education in the 1950s and 1960s, seldom encountered women poets. Poetry was dominated by male writers and critics. Males claimed universality in the literary language, recognizing the woman writer as the "other." The gender bias is evident even in the criticism of women poets. Ostriker says that "the language used to express literary admiration in general presumes the masculinity of the author, the work, and the act of creation – but not if the author is a woman." Gender defined the criticism that a poem would receive, rather than the actual work itself. The new wave of poetry, starting in the 1960s, featured women poets who chose to "explore experiences central to their sex and to find forms and styles appropriate to their exploration." The multitude of styles and subjects that these women poets use constitutes a new movement, one that is "comparable to romanticism or modernism in our literary past."

== Synopsis ==
The subject of Stealing the Language is that of “the extraordinary tide of poetry by American women” stemming from 1960 and the literary movement that this work engenders. For Ostriker, these women poets are “challenging and transforming the history of poetry.” The introduction raises key themes woven throughout the book of the systematic and oppressive gendering of customary literary language, the critical and social dismissal of a poet's exploration of female experience, and the difficulty of acknowledging difference and originality of women poets.

"Stealing the Language is an attempt to collectively redefine “woman” and “woman poet.” A central point of the work is the “that women writers have been imprisoned in an ‘oppressor’s language’ which denies them access to authoritative expression”. The title of the book references the need to steal and re-appropriate the language with all its male privilege into a language which can better describe and more fully express women's experiences. Chapter 1, entitled “I’m Nobody: Women’s Poetry, 1650-1960,” discusses the confined past of American women's poetry. Ostriker notes the evolution from the unfettered and relatively unconstrained Colonial period since there were so few women poets, to the increase of women poets in the 19th century causing reactionary cultural restriction. With the advent of modernism, the general quality of women's poetry rise and topics for poetry became more far more open. Ostriker writes, ”[that] like every literary movement, contemporary women’s poetry in part perpetuates and in part denounces and renounces its past.” This in turn creates a paradoxical situation where women writers today credit their predecessors with contributing “the line of feeling to American poetry” while also creating work that attempts to surmount the “mental and moral confinements” of their forebears. Ostriker then discusses connected motifs in women's poetry in the subsequent chapters. The motifs discussed constitute “an extended investigation of culturally repressed elements in female identity” but also evinces that the subjects of women's poetry tend to “generate particular formal and stylistic decisions, often designed to disrupt and alter our sense of literary norms.” Chapter 2, “Divided Selves: The Quest for Identity,” argues “the central project of the women’s poetry movement is a quest for autonomous self-definition.” It further discusses female identity images, which are all variations “on the theme of a divided self, rooted in the authorized dualities of the culture.” Chapter 3, “Body Language: The Release of Anatomy” deals with “an array of attitudes to the body, ranging from a sense of its vulnerability to a sense of its power, and concludes with a consideration of the way women write about nature, or the world’s body, as continuous or equivalent with their own.” Ostriker notes that in the definition of a personal identity, women tend to start with their bodies, as well as to “interpret external reality through the medium of the body.” Chapter 4, “Herr God, Herr Lucifer: Anger, Violence, and Polarization” focuses on elements of anger and violence in women's poetry. These subjects are “equivalent expressions of rage at entrapment in gender-polarized relationships.” In this vein, poems of a satiric or retaliatory nature that seek to “dismantle the myth of the male as lover, hero, father, and God are designed to confirm polarization and hierarchy as intolerable.” Chapter 5, “The Imperative of Intimacy: Female Erotics, Female Poetics” centers on “the question of female desire, attempting to show how an 'imperative of intimacy'…shapes the way women write love poetry, poetry about the family, about spiritual ancestresses and sisters, about a political life, and about self-integration.” This imperative stems from a communal, plural identity, which is not merely personal, although poems of this nature commonly function as “personal transactions between poets and readers.” The final chapter, “Thieves of Language: Women Poets and Revisionist Mythology” examines revisionist mythmaking as a major strategy to overcome the denial of authoritative expression. Revision of myths invades “the sanctuaries of language where our meanings for ‘male’ and ‘female’ are stored; to rewrite them from a female point of view is to discover new possibilities for meaning.” Through revisionist mythmaking, an exploration and a transformation of the self and culture at large is possible.

== Critical reception ==
Ms. Magazine called it “the most important contribution to contemporary poetry of the year", while Booklist praised the scope of the book as “an eye-opener of a study.”

== Mentions ==
Since its 1987 publication, Stealing the Language has been groundbreaking for feminist literary criticism as well as for the feminist poetry movement. Google Scholar shows that it is cited in at least 355 scholarly works with varied subjects ranging from studies of individual women poets like Anne Sexton and Adrienne Rich to books on feminist literary criticism and the gendered nature of language. Stealing the Language is interconnected to the fields of feminist literary criticism, feminist poetry, and gender studies. Stealing the Language is mentioned in Giannina Braschi's Spanglish novel Yo-Yo Boing! (1998).
