= Alicia Ostriker =

American poet and scholar (born 1937)

Alicia Suskin Ostriker
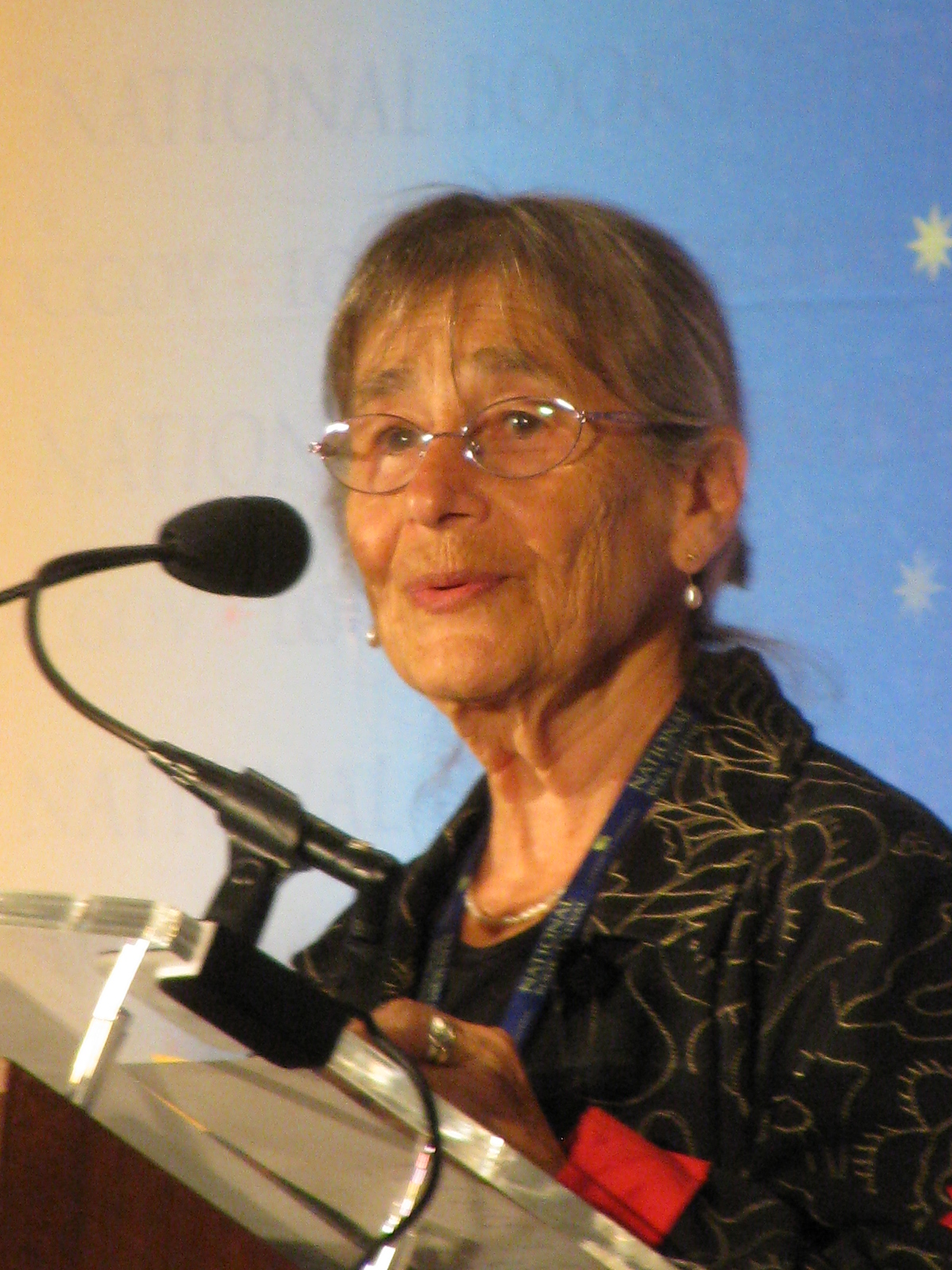
- Ostriker in 2014
- Born: November 11, 1937 (age 89); Brooklyn, New York, U.S.
- Education: Brandeis University, B.A. (1959); University of Wisconsin-Madison, M.A. (1961), Ph.D.(1964)
- Occupation: Poet
- Spouse: Jeremiah P. Ostriker (m. 1958; died 2025)
- Children: Rebecca Ostriker; Eve Ostriker; Gabriel Ostriker
- Writing career
- Genre: Poetry

Alicia Suskin Ostriker (born November 11, 1937) is an American poet and scholar who writes Jewish feminist poetry. She was called "America's most fiercely honest poet" by Progressive. Additionally, she was one of the first women poets in America to write and publish poems discussing the topic of motherhood. In 2015, she was elected a Chancellor of the Academy of American Poets. In 2018, she was named the New York State Poet Laureate.

== Personal life and education ==
Ostriker was born in Brooklyn, New York, to David Suskin and Beatrice Linnick Suskin. She grew up in the Manhattan housing projects during the Great Depression. Her father worked for New York City Parks Department. Her mother read her William Shakespeare and Robert Browning, and Alicia began writing poems, as well as drawing, from an early age. Initially, she had hoped to be an artist and studied art as a teenager. Her books, Songs (1969) and A Dream of Springtime (1979), spotlight her own illustrations. Ostriker went to high school at Ethical Culture Fieldston School in 1955.

Ostriker holds a bachelor's degree from Brandeis University (1959), and an M.A. (1961) and Ph.D. (1964) from the University of Wisconsin–Madison. In Ostriker's first year of graduate school, she attended a conference where a visiting professor commented on her poetry by saying, "'You women poets are very graphic, aren't you?'" This comment caused her to reflect on the meaning of being a woman poet. She had never thought of that term before and she realized that men were uncomfortable when women wrote about their own bodies. This encounter became a defining moment in her life and from that moment on, she wrote poems discussing the various facets of a woman: sexuality, motherhood, pregnancy, and mortality. On the other hand, her doctoral dissertation, on the work of William Blake, became her first book, Vision and Verse in William Blake (1965). Later, she edited and annotated Blake's complete poems for Penguin Press.

Ostriker was married to astronomer Jeremiah P. Ostriker, who taught at Princeton University (1971–2001), from 1958 until his death in 2025. They have three children: Rebecca (1963), Eve (1965), and Gabriel (1970). She has been a resident of Princeton, New Jersey.

== Career and work ==
Ostriker began her teaching career at Rutgers University in 1965 and has served as an English professor until she retired in 2004. Ostriker decided to pursue a career while also taking care of her children which was very uncommon during this time. Ostriker's ambition, desire to live a life different from her mother's, and her husband's refusal to let her become a housewife influenced her to make that choice. In 1969, her first collection of poems, Songs, was published by Holt, Rinehart and Winston. This collection contained poems that she wrote while she was still a student. Her poems reflect the influence poets such as Gerard Manley Hopkins, John Keats, W.H. Auden, William Blake, and Walt Whitman have had on her and her poetry.

Her second collection of poems published was Once More Out of Darkness. Majority of the poems were written in free verse. While she was writing this collection of poems, Ostriker became aware of her feminist views. The poems that compose this collection were based on her first two experiences of pregnancy and childbirth as she had her first two children 18 months apart. Discussing these topics in her poems made her cognizant of the fact that she had not previously read poems about these topics and that she was breaking a taboo. Her third volume of poems, A Dream of Springtime, had poems that demonstrated her growth by discussing her emerging from her past and discovering herself and her identity.

Her fourth book of poems, The Mother/Child Papers (1980), a feminist classic, was inspired by the birth of her son during the Vietnam War and weeks after the Kent State shootings. Throughout, she juxtaposes musings about motherhood with musings about war. She also discusses her husband and her other two children in her poems. This collection allowed her to explore her identity as a woman by examining her role as a mother, wife, and professor. It did take her ten years to write the poems that make up this collection as she gained more inspiration from events that were happening in society such as the American Feminist movement.

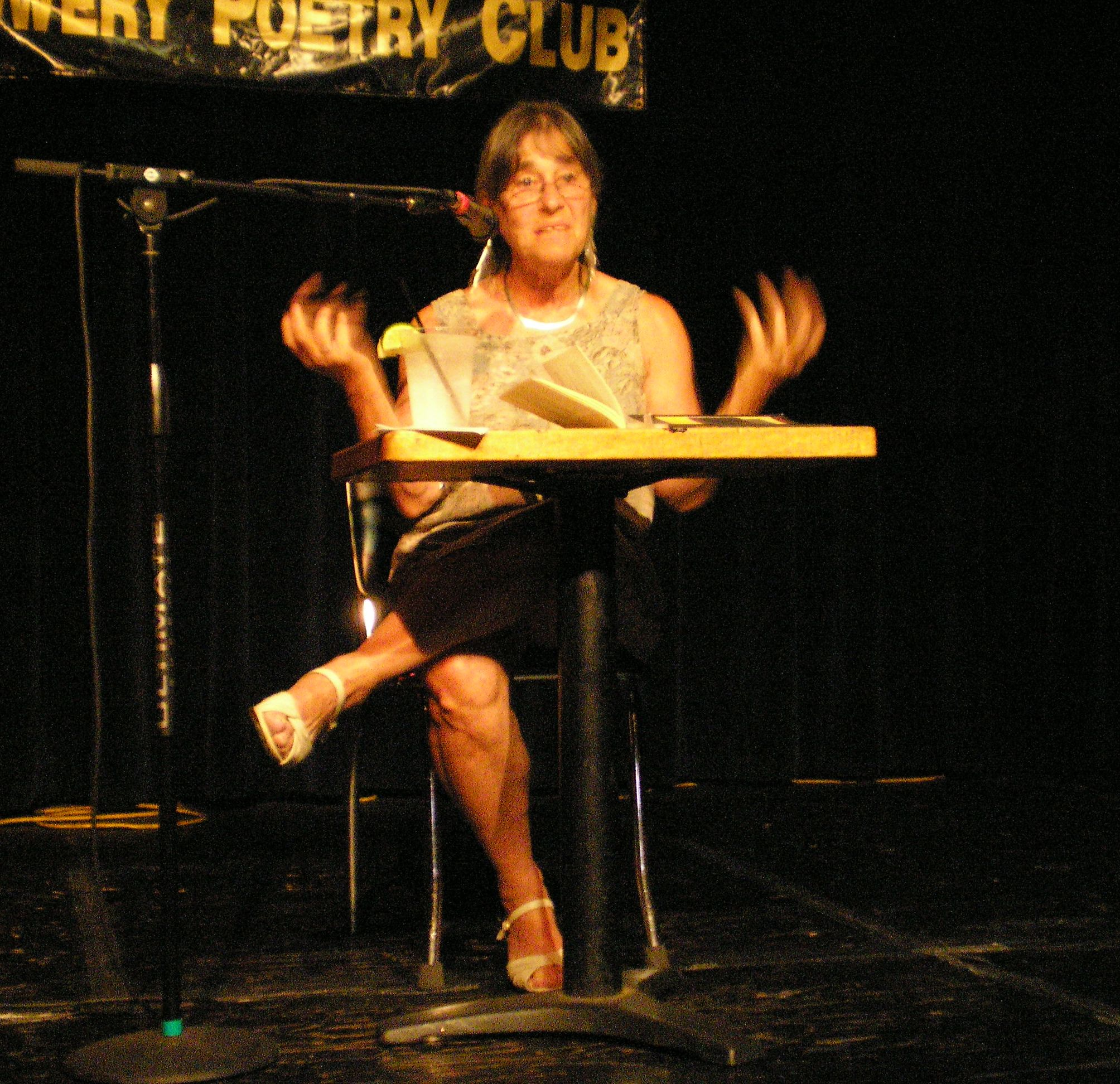
Alicia Ostriker howling: remembering Allen Ginsberg.

Ostriker's books of nonfiction explore many of the same themes manifest in her verse. They include Writing Like a Woman (1983), which explores the poems of Sylvia Plath, Anne Sexton, H.D., May Swenson and Adrienne Rich, and The Nakedness of the Fathers: Biblical Visions and Revisions (1994), which approaches the Torah with a midrashic sensibility. She wrote the introduction to Giannina Braschi's Empire of Dreams, a postmodern poetry classic of the Spanish Caribbean (1994).

Ostriker's sixth collection of poems, The Imaginary Lover (1986), won the William Carlos Williams Award of the Poetry Society of America. The poems included in this collection had a feminist voice, probably due to fact that at the same time, she was doing research for her second feminist criticism book, Stealing the Language: the Emergence of Women Poets in America. In The Imaginary Lover, Ostriker examines the fantasies associated with womanhood by discussing topics such as mother-daughter relationships and marriage. The Crack in Everything (1996) was a National Book Award finalist, and won the Paterson Poetry Award and the San Francisco State Poetry Center Award. The Little Space: Poems Selected and New, 1968–1998 was also a 1998 National Book Award finalist.

Green Age (1989) was Ostriker's most visionary and successful collection of poems. Themes analyzed in this collection was time, history and politics, and inner spirituality and how these helped her heal. Ostriker highlights how there is a lack of feminist spirituality in traditional religions.

Ostriker's most recent nonfiction book is For the Love of God (2007), a work that continues her midrash exploration of biblical texts begun with Feminist Revision and the Bible (1993) and The Nakedness of the Fathers: Biblical Visions and Revisions (1994). Dancing at the Devil's Party (2000) examines the work of poets from William Blake and Walt Whitman to Maxine Kumin. Early in the introduction to the book, she disagrees with W. H. Auden's assertion that poetry makes nothing happen. Poetry, Ostriker writes, "can tear at the heart with its claws, make the neural nets shiver, flood us with hope, despair, longing, ecstasy, love, anger, terror".

Ostriker's poems have appeared in a wide variety of periodicals, including The New Yorker, The Nation, Poetry, American Poetry Review, Paris Review, The Atlantic, Yale Review, Kenyon Review, Iowa Review, Shenandoah Review, Antaeus, Colorado Review, Denver Quarterly, Boulevard, Poetry East, New England Review, Santa Monica Review, Triquarterly Review, Seneca Review, Ms., Ontario Review, Bridges, Tikkun, Prairie Schooner, Gettysburg Review, Lyric, Fence, and Ploughshares.

A variety of Ostriker's poems have been translated into Italian, French, German, Spanish, Chinese, Japanese, Hebrew and Arabic. Stealing the Language has been translated into Japanese and published in Japan. Her fifty-year poetry career is the subject of a collection of essays by American poets and feminist literary scholars, entitled "Every Woman Her Own Theology".

== Honors, fellowships, and awards ==
- 1964-1965 American Association of University Women Fellowship
- 1966 Rutgers University Research Council summer scholar grant
- 1967 American Foundation for the Advancement of Humanities Younger Scholar Grant
- 1974, 1976, 1985, 1997, 2000 MacDowell Colony Fellow
- 1976-1977 National Foundation for the Arts Fellowship in Poetry
- 1977 Breadloaf Writers' Conference Fellowship
- 1977 New Jersey Arts Council Award in Poetry
- 1979 A Dream of Springtime selected as one of the best small press titles
- 1982 Rockefeller Foundation Fellowship for Research in the Humanities
- 1984-1985 Guggenheim Foundation Fellowship for Poetry
- 1986 Strousse Poetry Prize, Prairie Schooner
- 1986 Poetry Society of America William Carlos Williams Prize for The Imaginary Lover
- 1987 Rutgers University Trustees Award for Excellence in Research
- Summer 1987 Djerassi Foundation Resident
- 1992 New Jersey Arts Council Award in Poetry
- 1994 Edward Stanley Award, for poems published in Prairie Schooner
- 1994 Judah Magnes Jewish Museum, Berkeley, Anna David Rosenberg Award for Poems on the Jewish Experience. First Prize for "The Eighth and Thirteenth."
- 1995 Rutgers University Faculty of Arts and Sciences Award for Distinguished Contributors to Undergraduate Education
- 1995-6 Fellow, Rutgers Center for Historical Analysis
- 1996-7 Associate Fellow, Rutgers Center for Historical Analysis
- 1996 Poem in The Best American Poetry
- 1996 Poem in Yearbook of American Poetry
- 1997 Paterson Poetry Prize for The Crack in Everything
- 1998 San Francisco State Poetry Center Award for The Crack in Everything
- 1998 Readers’ Choice Award for poems published in Prairie Schooner
- February 1999 Residency at the Villa Serbelloni, Bellagio Study and Conference Center, Italy
- 1999 Poem in Pushcart Prize Anthology
- 2000 San Diego Women's Institute for Continuing Jewish Education: Endowment Award
- Fall 2001 Visiting Fellowship, Clare Hall, Cambridge
- 2002 Larry Levis Prize for poems published in Prairie Schooner
- 2003 Best American Essays Notable Essay for “Milk.”
- 2003 Geraldine R. Dodge Foundation Fellow
- 2007 Anderbo Poetry Prize distinguished poem
- 2008 Outstanding Academic Title, Choice June 2008, for For the Love of God.
- 2009 National Jewish Book Award in Poetry for The Book of Seventy
- 2010 Prairie Schooner Virginia Faulkner Award for Excellence in Writing, for poems published in the summer 2009 issue.
- 2010 Paterson Award for Sustained Literary Achievement for The Book of Seventy
- 2011 Named in the list of “10 Great Jewish Poets” in Moment
- 2017 National Jewish Book Award in the Poetry category for Waiting for the Light
- 2018 Named 11th New York State Poet

=== Finalists ===
- 1996 The Crack in Everything finalist of the National Book Award for Poetry
- 1998 The Little Space finalist of the National Book Award for Poetry
- 1999 The Little Space finalist for Lenore Marshall Prize, Academy of American Poets

== Bibliography ==
=== Poetry ===
==== Collections ====
- Ostriker, Alicia (1969). Songs : a book of poems. New York: Holt Rinehart and Winston. ISBN 9780030810190.
- Once More Out of Darkness and Other Poems. Berkeley: Berkeley Poets' Press, 1974. ISBN 9780917658006
- A Dream of Springtime: Poems 1970–1978. New York: Smith/Horizon Press, 1979. ISBN 9780912292533
- The Mother/Child Papers. Los Angeles: Momentum Press, 1980. Rpt. Beacon Press, 1986, Pittsburgh, 2008. ISBN 9780822960331
- A Woman Under the Surface. Princeton: Princeton University Press. 1982. ISBN 9780691013909. "Alicia Ostriker."
- The Imaginary Lover. Pittsburgh: University of Pittsburgh Press, 1986. ISBN 9780822935438
- Green Age. Pittsburgh: University of Pittsburgh Press, 1989. ISBN 9780822936244
- The Crack in Everything. Pittsburgh: University of Pittsburgh Press, 1996. ISBN 9780822939368
- The Little Space: Poems Selected and New, 1968–1998. 1998, University of Pittsburgh. ISBN 9780822956808
- The Volcano Sequence. Pittsburgh: University of Pittsburgh Press, 2002. ISBN 9780822957843
- No Heaven. Pittsburgh: University of Pittsburgh Press, 2005. ISBN 9780822958758
- The Book of Seventy. Pittsburgh: University of Pittsburgh Press, 2009, ISBN 9780822960515
- At the Revelation Restaurant and Other Poems, Marick Press, 2010, ISBN 9781934851067
- The Book of Life: Selected Poems 1979-2011, Pittsburgh: The University of Pittsburgh Press, 2012, ISBN 978-0822961819
- The Old Woman, the Tulip, and the Dog, University of Pittsburgh Press, 2014, ISBN 9780822962915
- Waiting for the Light, University of Pittsburgh Press, 2017, ISBN 9780822964520
- The Holy and Broken Bliss, Alice James Books, 2024, ISBN 978-1949944679

==== Poems ====
Title	Year	First published	Reprinted/collected
April	2011	Ostriker, Alicia (February 2011). "April". Poetry.	Henderson, Bill, ed. (2013). The Pushcart Prize XXXVII : best of the small presses 2013. Pushcart Press. pp. 151–152.

=== Critical and scholarly books ===
- Vision and Verse in William Blake. Madison: University of Wisconsin Press, 1965, OCLC 63827480
- William Blake: the Complete Poems. New York: Penguin Books, 1977. Edited with Notes, pp. 870–1075. ISBN 9780140422153
- Writing Like a Woman. Ann Arbor: University of Michigan Press Poets on Poetry series. 1983. ISBN 9780472063475. "Alicia Ostriker."
- Stealing the Language: The Emergence of Women's Poetry in America. Boston: Beacon 1986, ISBN 9780807063033
- Feminist Revision and the Bible: the Bucknell Lectures on Literary Theory. London and Cambridge, Mass.: Blackwell 1993. ISBN 9780631187981
- Empire of Dreams, poetry by Giannina Braschi; introduction by Alicia Ostriker, Yale University Press, 1994.
- The Nakedness of the Fathers: Biblical Visions and Revisions. Rutgers University Press. 1997. ISBN 9780813524474.
- Dancing at the Devil’s Party: Essays on Poetry, Politics and the Erotic. Ann Arbor: University of Michigan Press Poets on Poetry series 2000.
- For the Love of God: the Bible as an Open Book. New Brunswick, NJ: Rutgers University Press. 2007. ISBN 9780813548722.

== Popular culture ==
- Alicia Ostriker's poem “A Young Woman, a Tree” appears in Kurt Cobain's posthumously published Journals.
- in Giannina Braschi's Spanglish novel Yo-Yo Boing! (1998), poets and philosophers discuss the state of American poetry and mention Stealing the Language.
