= Frederick Luis Aldama =

American academic (born 1969)

Frederick Luis Aldama The Jacob & Frances Sanger Mossiker Chair in the Humanities
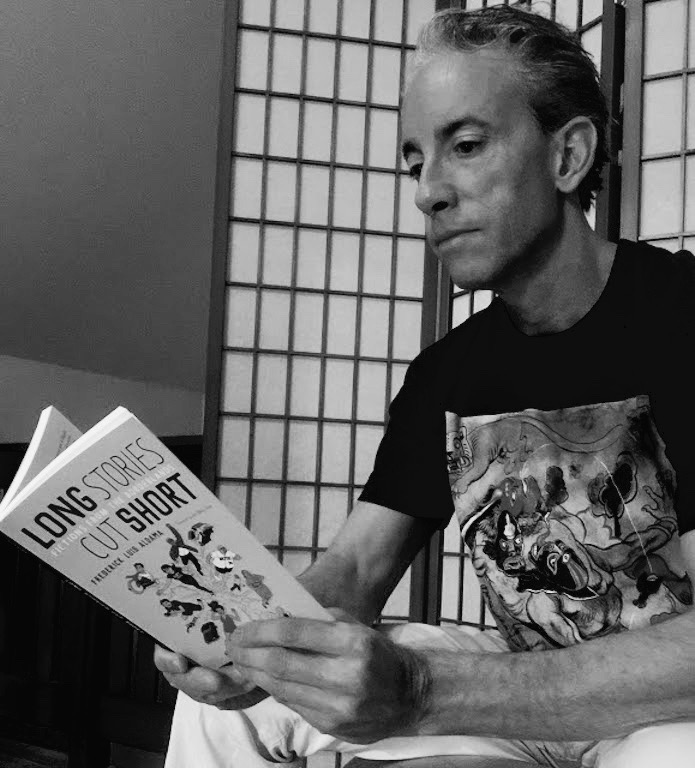
- Reading
- Born: March 6, 1969 (age 57); Mexico City, Mexico
- Occupations: University professor, author, editor
- Awards: Eisner Award (2018)

Academic background
- Education: PhD, Stanford University (1999), BA, University of California, Berkeley (1992)

Academic work
- Discipline: Storytelling Science, Narrative, Media, Comics Studies
- Sub-discipline: Latino pop culture and story creation and reception
- Institutions: University of Texas at Austin
- Notable works: "Through Fences" (2024), "Con Papá/With Papá" (2022), Long Story Cut Short (2017),Latinx Superheroes in Mainstream Comics (2018)
- Website: https://www.frederickluisaldama.com

Frederick Luis Aldama (otherwise known as Professor Latinx) is an American author and editor of over 60 books, including the 2018 Eisner Award for Best Academic/Scholarly Work for Latinx Superheroes in Mainstream Comics.

He holds the Jacob & Frances Sanger Mossiker Chair in the Humanities at UT Austin where he is founder and director of the Latinx Pop Lab at the University of Texas, Austin. At UT Austin he is also affiliate faculty in Mexican American/ Latino Studies and LLILAS (Lozano Long Institute of Latin American Studies). He continues to hold affiliate faculty status as former Distinguished University Professor at The Ohio State University.

He teaches courses grounded in Storytelling Science that focus on Latino pop culture, especially in the areas of comics, TV, film, animation, and video games at UT Austin. At the Ohio State University he was Distinguished University Professor, Arts & Humanities Distinguished Professor of English, University Distinguished Scholar, and Alumni Distinguished Teacher as well as recipient of the Rodica C. Botoman Award for Distinguished Teaching and Mentoring and the Susan M. Hartmann Mentoring and Leadership Award. He was also founder and director of the LASER/Latinx Space for Enrichment Research and founder and director of the Humanities & Cognitive Sciences High School Summer Institute.

He has been inducted into the National Academy of Teachers, National Cartoonist Society, the Texas Institute of Letters, the Ohio State University's Hall of Fame, and as board of directors for the Academy of American Poets. He sits on the boards for American Library Association Graphic Novel and Comics Round Table, BreakBread Literacy Project, and Ad Astra Media. He is founder and director of UT Austin's BIPOC POP: Comics, Gaming & Animation Arts Expo & Symposium as well as Editor-in-Chief at Flowersong Press as well as founder and Editor-in-Chief of the Latinx Pop Magazine.

== Early life and education ==
Aldama was born in Mexico City to a Guatemalan- and Irish-American mother from Los Angeles and a Mexican father from Mexico City. When he was a child, his mother moved the family to California. He received his undergraduate degree summa cum laude in English from the University of California, Berkeley in 1992 and obtained his PhD in English from Stanford University in 1999. In Urja Upadhyaya's feature for the Cal Alumni Association reveals just how formative UC Berkeley was for Aldama—and how professors like the late Barbara Christian and Alfred Arteaga helped launch his career as a celebrated scholar, professor, mentor, and author. In an interview with OSU's Reem Kadimi-Skalli regarding his endowing of a undergraduate Leadership Scholarship Fund, Aldama talks about the importance of creating interventions in the infrastructure of recognition for those who faced similar struggles to his own.

== Career ==
Aldama is an author of over 60 books. This includes scholarly books as well as children's literature, YA and adult fiction, as well as comics and graphic novels. In 2017, Aldama published his first book of fiction, Long Stories Cut Short: Fictions from the Borderlands. His flash fiction style depicts marginalized Latino lives on both sides of the US/Mexico border. He is the author of the children's books, Con Papá / With Papá and The Adventures of Charlie the Chupacabra (English 2020; Spanish 221). He wrote and produced the animation film Carlitos Chupacabra as well as produced the first documentary film on the history of Latino superheroes in mainstream comics.

In his scholarly work Aldama uses insights from narrative theory, cognitive science, and critical cultural and media theory to enrich understanding of the creation, distribution, and consumption of fiction, poetry, comics, and media, especially focused on Latino pop cultural phenomena. See books and awards below.

He is series editor and co-editor of over 10-book series, including the Latinx and Latin American Profiles (with University of Pittsburgh Press) that publishes scholarship on innovative Latino cultural figures, such as Reading Junot Diaz and Poets, Philosophers, Lovers: On the Writings of Giannina Braschi. He edits the Global Media & Race and Critical Graphics series (with Rutgers University Press). He edits the Biographix series (University Press of Mississippi) that provides critical insight to key figures in comics. He co-edits the Global Latin/o Americas series (the Ohio State University Press), Latinx Pop Culture(University of Arizona Press) as well as the World Comics and Graphic Nonfiction series (for the University of Texas Press). Aldama edits two graphic narrative series: Brown Ink and Latinographix, a comic books series that showcases graphic novels, memoir, and nonfiction by Latino writers and artists, including From Cocinas to Lucha Libre Ringsides, Tales from la Vida: A Latinx Comics Anthology and United States of Banana: A Graphic Novel by Giannina Braschi (illustrated by Joakim Lindengren).

He co-founded and directed SÕL-CON: The Brown, Black, & Indigenous Comics Expo. He is founder and director of the Latinx Pop Lab BIPOC Comics & Multimedia Arts Expo & Symposium at UT Austin—the nation's premier comic book symposium and expo that focuses on the work of BIPOC scholars, artists, writers, editors, filmmakers, and illustrators from the U.S. and beyond. He served on the executive council of the International Society for the Study of Narrative from 2013 to 2015, and serves on the advisory boards for journals such as Narrative, INKS: The Journal of Comics Society, MELUS, and Journal of Narrative Theory. He is a member of the board for the Oxford Bibliographies in Latino Studies. He is an associate editor of American Book Review and judge for the TIL/Texas Institute of Letters. He has endowed several scholarships and awards to open doors and recognize creative and scholarly work as well as leadership. In an interview where he discusses his Leadership Scholarship Fund for OSU's Department of English, he states, "Too many brilliant English majors, especially those who've faced educational or economic obstacles, have the vision and drive to make real change but need support to fully realize their potential."

=== Essays, interviews, and media appearances ===
Aldama's articles, reviews, and interviews have appeared in Aztlán, College Literature, Poets & Writers, World Literature Today, Cross Cultural Poetics, Lit: Literature Interpretation Theory, Lucero, Comparative Literature, The Callaloo Journal, Nepantla, Journal of Interdisciplinary Literary Analysis, American Literature, Latin American Research Review, Modern Fiction Studies, Modern Drama, SubStance, Style, ImageTexT, Latino Studies Projections: The Journal of Movies and Mind, Alter/nativas: Latin American Cultural Studies Journal, and Journal of the West. Interviews with Aldama have appeared in ABC News, PBS, Fox News Latino, CNN, VOXXI, MSNBC, Telemundo, The Washington Post, the New York Times, the Los Angeles Review of Books, Channel 10 news, Hispanic Living; Listin Diario; Spain's Efe; KETR Radio, KCET's Artbound “Love & Rockets” documentary, and TUBI's Gone Before His Time: Freddie Prinze Sr. His the podcast host for "Into the COLA-verse" that listeners on the unique journeys of faculty in the College of Liberal Arts at UT Austin.

== Selected awards ==
- 2025 TACHE/Texas Association of Chicanos in Higher Education Outstanding Book Award for the Fiction. Through Fences
- 2025 Texas Institute of Letters Jean Flynn Award: Best Young Adult Book Honor Winner. Through Fences
- 2024 CreARTe Expo Short Film Award. Carlitos Chupacabra
- 2024 The Alma Flor Ada Best Latino Focused Children's Picture Book Award. International Latino Book Awards. Honorable Mention. Las Aventuras de Chupacabra Charlie
- 2023 Best Academic Themed Book. International Latino Book Award. Honorable Mention. Latinx TV in the Twenty-First Century
- 2023 The Alma Flor Ada Best Latino Focused Children's Picture Book Award. International Latino Book Awards. Honorable Mention. Con Papá / With Papá
- 2022 Honorable Mention. Media Arts Festival. University of North Texas. Carlitos Chupacabra
- 2022 Festival de Cine Latinoamericano NORTE. Honorable Mention. Mexico. Carlitos Chupacabra
- 2021 International Latino Book Award Honorable Mention. Decolonizing Latinx Masculinities
- 2021 Comics Studies Society Honorable Mention Award for Graphic Indigeneity
- 2018–2019 Susan M. Hartmann Mentoring and Leadership Award
- 2018–2019 Rodica C. Botoman Award for Distinguished Undergraduate Teaching and Mentoring
- 2018 Eisner Award for Best Academic/Scholarly Work for Latinx Superheroes in Mainstream Comics
- 2018 International Latino Book Award for Best Nonfiction
- 2017 Alumni Award for Distinguished Teaching and inducted into the Academy of Teaching
- 2016 American Association of Hispanics in Higher Education's Outstanding Latino/a Faculty Award
- 2016 Ohio Education Summit Award
- 2015 White House "Hispanic Education Bright Spot" Award for founding and directing LASER
- 2014 Arts and Humanities Distinguished Professor
- 2014 University Emerging Community Engagement Award
- 2008 University Distinguished Diversity Enhancement Award
- 2004 MLA Award: Outstanding Scholarly Book Chicano/Latino Studies for Dancing with Ghosts: A Critical Biography of Arturo Islas
- 1999 Ford Foundation Fellowship

== Books published ==
=== Author ===
- Postethnic Narrative Criticism: Magicorealism in Oscar "Zeta" Acosta, Ana Castillo, Julie Dash, Hanif Kureishi, and Salman Rushdie. University of Texas Press. August 2009. ISBN 9780292722101. OCLC 320192033.
- Dancing With Ghosts: A Critical Biography of Arturo Islas. Berkeley, CA: University of California Press. December 2004. ISBN 9780520243927. OCLC 57207131.
- Brown on Brown: Chicano/a Representations of Gender, Sexuality and Ethnicity. Austin, TX: University of Texas Press. January 2005. ISBN 978-0-292-70940-9. OCLC 62746185.
- Spilling the Beans in Chicanolandia: Conversations with Artists and Writers. Austin, TX: University of Texas Press. January 2006. ISBN 978-0-292-71312-3. OCLC 69199653.
- Why the Humanities Matter: A Commonsense Approach. Austin, TX: University of Texas Press. July 2008. ISBN 9780292717985. OCLC 179786739.
- Your Brain On Latino Comics: From Gus Arriola to Los Bros Hernandez. Austin, TX: University of Texas Press. June 2009. ISBN 978-0-292-71973-6. OCLC 429911628.
- A User's Guide to Postcolonial and Latino Borderland Fiction. Austin, TX: University of Texas Press. January 2009. ISBN 978-0-292-72577-5. OCLC 288932889.
- The Routledge Concise History of Latino/a Literature (1st ed.). New York, NY: Routledge. January 2013. ISBN 9780415667876. OCLC 779258509.
- Formal Matters in Contemporary Latino Poetry. New York, NY: Palgrave Macmillan. July 2013. ISBN 9780230391635. OCLC 829739896.
- Mex-Ciné: Mexican Filmmaking, Production, and Consumption in the Twenty-first Century. Ann Arbor, MI: University of Michigan Press. December 2013. ISBN 9780472029129. OCLC 844924402.
- Ilan, Stavans; Aldama, Frederick Luis (December 2013). ¡Muy Pop! Conversations on Latino Popular Culture. Ann Arbor, MI: University of Michigan Press. ISBN 9780472029440. OCLC 874149423.
- González, Christopher; Aldama, Frederick Luis (2013-11-15). Latinos in the End Zone: Conversations on the Brown Color Line in the NFL. New York, NY: Palgrave Pivot. ISBN 978-1137403087. OCLC 860395198.
- Hogan, Patrick Colm; Aldama, Frederick Luis (February 2014). Conversations on Cognitive Cultural Studies: Literature, Language, Aesthetics. Columbus, OH: Ohio State University Press. ISBN 9780814212431. OCLC 861955952.
- The Cinema of Robert Rodriguez. Austin, TX: University of Texas Press. 2014-10-15. ISBN 9780292761216. OCLC 878667406.
- Lindenberger, Herbert S.; Aldama, Frederick Luis (February 2016). Aesthetics of Discomfort: Conversations on Disquieting Art. Ann Arbor, MI: University of Michigan Press. ISBN 9780472073009. OCLC 930257206.
- Ilan, Stavans; Aldama, Frederick Luis (January 2016). Laughing Matters: Conversations on Humor. San Diego, CA: Hyperbole Books. ISBN 978-1938537912. OCLC 940997852.
- Long Stories Cut Short: Fictions from the Borderlands (in English and Spanish). Tucson, AZ: The University of Arizona Press. 2017-02-07. ISBN 9780816536115. OCLC 965129760.
- Latinx Superheroes in Mainstream Comics. Tucson, AZ: The University of Arizona Press. October 2017. ISBN 9780816537082. OCLC 4183209848.
- González, Christopher; Aldama, Frederick Luis (December 2018). Latinx Studies: The Key Concepts. Routledge. ISBN 978-1138088443. OCLC 1012346313.
- Latino/a Children's and Young Adult Writers on the Art of Storytelling. Pittsburgh, PA: University of Pittsburgh Press. January 2018. ISBN 978-0822964971. OCLC 989035334.
- Nericcio, William Anthony; Aldama, Frederick Luis (November 2019). Talking #browntv: Latinas and Latinos on Screen. Columbus, OH: Ohio State University Press. ISBN 978-0814255599. OCLC 9664323216.
- González, Christopher; Aldama, Frederick Luis (September 2019). Reel Latinxs: Representation in U.S. Film and TV. Tucson, AZ: The University of Arizona Press. ISBN 978-0816539581. OCLC 9491289522.
- The Adventures of Chupacabra Charlie. Latinographix. Illustrations by Chris Escobar. Columbus, OH: Mad Creek Books. June 2020. ISBN 978-0814255865. OCLC 9477020784.
- Las aventuras de Chupacabra Charlie. Latinographix. Illustrations by Chris Escobar. Translation by Sonia Rodríguez Salazar. Columbus, OH: Mad Creek Books, August 2021. ISBN 978-0-8142-5801-9.
- Con Papá/With Papá. illustrated by Nicky Rodriguez. Mad Creek Books, 2022. ISBN 978-0-8142-1521-0
- Pyroclast. Illustrated by Guillermo Villarreal. Chispa Comics, 2023.
- Through Fences. Illustrated by Oscar Garza. Mad Creek Books, 2024. ISBN 978-0-8142-5895-8
- The Absolutely (Almost) True Adventures of Max Rodriguez. Flowersong Press, 2024. ISBN 978-1-963245-55-4
- Las Aventuras (Casi) Verdaderas de Max Rodriguez. Spanish. Brown Ink/FlowerSong Press, 2024. 978-1963245776
- Labyrinths Borne. English. Ad Astra Media, 2024. ISBN 979-8869173263
- Labyrinths Borne. Spanish. Ad Astra Media, 2024. ISBN 979-8-3303-7530-1
- Comics Studies: Key Concepts. Single author. Routledge, 2026. ISBN 978-0-367-19687-5
- Global Comics: The Basics. Routledge. Routledge, 2026. ISBN 978-1-138-08820-7
- Latinx Literature: A Very Short Introduction. Oxford UP. ISBN 978-0-19-766376-9
- Latinx TV: Routledge Television Guidebooks. Routledge. ISBN 978-0-367-37588-1

=== Editor ===
- Islas, Arturo (2003). Arturo Islas: The Uncollected Works. Houston, TX: Arte Público Press. ISBN 9781611920642. OCLC 606994143.
- Critical Mappings of Arturo Islas's Fictions. Tempe, AZ: Bilingual Press/Editorial Bilingüe. July 2005. ISBN 978-1931010313. OCLC 55878022.
- Multicultural Comics: From Zap to Blue Beetle. Austin, TX: University of Texas Press. November 2011. ISBN 978-0292737433. OCLC 773258062.
- Toward a Cognitive Theory of Narrative Acts. Austin, TX: University of Texas Press. June 2010. ISBN 978-0-292-72888-2. OCLC 471787942.
- Analyzing World Fiction: New Horizons in Narrative Theory. Austin, TX: University of Texas Press. September 2011. ISBN 9780292747647. OCLC 829884734.
- Latinos and Narrative Media: Participation and Portrayal. New York, NY: Palgrave Macmillan. 2013-11-07. ISBN 9781137366450. OCLC 845085678.
- Critical Approaches to the Films of Robert Rodriguez. Austin, TX: University of Texas Press. 2015-03-15. ISBN 978-1-4773-0240-8. OCLC 881720711.
- Latino/a Literature in the Classroom: 21st Century Approaches to Teaching. London: Routledge. 2015-06-23. ISBN 9780415724210. OCLC 852219289.
- González, Christopher; Aldama, Frederick Luis, eds. (2016-04-12). Graphic Borders: Latino Comic Books Past, Present, and Future. Austin, TX: University of Texas Press. ISBN 978-1-4773-0915-5. OCLC 920966195.
- The Routledge Companion to Latina/o Popular Culture. New York, NY: Routledge. 2016-05-26. ISBN 9781138638945. OCLC 931226946.
- Padilla, Ricardo; L'Hoeste, Héctor Fernández; González, Christopher (January 2016). Latinx Comic Book Storytelling: An Odyssey by Interview (1st ed.). San Diego, CA: Hyperbole Books. ISBN 978-1938537929. OCLC 973339575.
- Tales from la Vida: A Latinx Comics Anthology. Latinographix. Columbus, OH: Mad Creek Books. September 2018. ISBN 978-0-8142-5493-6. OCLC 9480057522.
- Comics Studies Here and Now. New York, NY: Routledge. 2018-05-10. ISBN 9781138498976. OCLC 1022076511.
- The Routledge Companion to Gender, Sex and Latin American Culture. Abingdon, Oxon: Routledge. 2018-06-04. ISBN 9781138894952. OCLC 1038269645.
- The Oxford Handbook of Comic Book Studies. Oxford University Press. March 2019. ISBN 9780190917944. OCLC 9415464108.
- Latinx Ciné in the Twenty-First Century. Tucson, AZ: The University of Arizona Press. September 2019. ISBN 978-0816537907. OCLC 9622110943.
- Jeff Smith: Conversations. Jackson, MS: University Press of Mississippi. October 2019. ISBN 978-1496824806. OCLC 9621677892.
- Graphic Indigeneity: Comics in the Americas and Australasia. Jackson, MS: University Press of Mississippi. June 2020. ISBN 978-1496828019. OCLC 9604784836.
- Aldama, Frederick Luis; O'Dwyer, Tess; and Stavans, Ilan. Poets, Philosophers, Lovers: On the Writings of Giannina Braschi. (Latinx and Latin American Profiles) Pittsburgh, PA: University of Pittsburgh Press. October 2020. 9780822946182.
- Putting the Prose Nonfiction Back in Latinx Studies: Prose Studies. Coedited with Katlin Marisol Sweeny. Taylor & Francis, 2021.
- 21st Century Approaches to Latinx Comics: Label Me Latina. Coedited with Lorna L. Perez. 2024. Taylor & Francis.
- Snapshots: Teaching Los Bros Hernandez. Coedited with William Nericcio. San Diego State University Press, 2025. ISBN 978-1-938537-57-8
- From Cocinas to Lucha Libre Ringsides: A Latinx Comics Anthology. Co-edited with Angela M. Sánchez. Mad Creek Books, 2025.ISBN 978-0-8142-8417-9
