= William Nericcio =

Chicano literary theorist and cultural critic

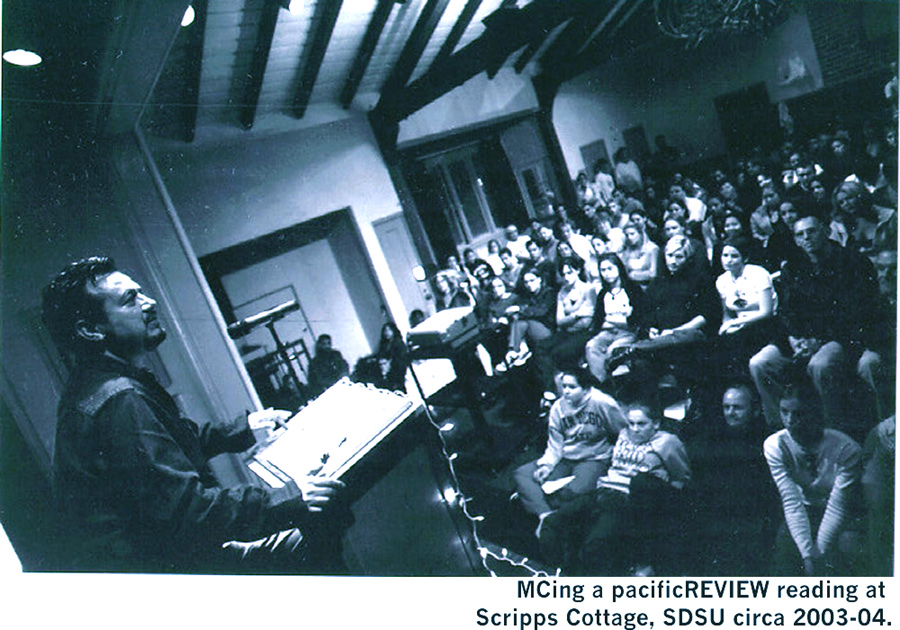
William Anthony Nericcio MCing a pacificREVIEW reading at Scripps Cottage, SDSU

William Anthony Nericcio, aka Memo, is a Chicano literary theorist, cultural critic, American literature scholar, and Professor of English and Comparative literature at San Diego State University (SDSU). Currently Director of the Master of Arts in Liberal Arts and Sciences program, he is the author of the award-winning Tex[t]-Mex: Seductive Hallucinations of the "Mexican" in America, The Hurt Business: Oliver Mayer's Early Works Plus, and Homer From Salinas: John Steinbeck's Enduring Voice for the Californias. Nericcio is also a graphic designer, creating book covers, film posters, and websites, most notably for SDSU Press and Hyperbole Books, where he oversees the production of cultural studies tomes. His Text-Mex Gallery blog investigates the pathological interrogation of Mexican, Latina/o, Chicana/o, "Hispanic," Mexican-American, and Latin American stereotypes, political, and cultural issues. He is also the curator of the text-image exhibition entitled “MEXtasy,” which has been displayed at numerous institutions, including University of Michigan and South Texas College. Currently working on his follow-up book to Tex[t]-Mex, Eyegiene: Permutations of Subjectivity in the Televisual Age of Sex and Race, his most recent publication is Talking #browntv: Latinas and Latinos on the Screen, co-authored with Frederick Luis Aldama, for the Ohio State University Press.

== Life and education ==
William Anthony Nericcio was born in Laredo, Texas, but with ancestry that hails from General Téran and Monterrey, Mexico, Partanna, Sicily, and England, and considers himself post-Movimiento Chicano. Nericcio received his BA in English from the University of Texas at Austin in 1984, then went on to complete his doctoral degree in Comparative Literature from Cornell University in 1989, with a dissertation entitled The Politics of Solitude: Alienation in the Literatures of the Americas. Nericcio's dissertation director was Enrico Mario Santí—other members of his committee included Henry Louis Gates Jr. and Kathleen Newman. While at Cornell, Nericcio served as a graduate research and teaching assistant to Carlos Fuentes at the A.D. White House Society for the Humanities.

== Academic career ==
After completing his doctoral degree in Comparative Literature at Cornell University, Nericcio accepted the position of Assistant Professor at the University of Connecticut, before joining the Department of English and Comparative Literature at San Diego State University (SDSU). There, he served two years as the Chair of the Department of English and Comparative Literature from August 2007 through October 2009, where he worked successfully to diversify the professoriate and the curriculum. He is now Director of the Master of Arts in Liberal Arts and Sciences program. He also serves on the faculties of the Chicana/o studies department, the Master of Arts in Liberal Arts and Sciences (MALAS), and the Center for Latin American studies.

His scholarship focuses on Chicano literature and film, Mexican-American cultural studies, continental philosophy, psychoanalysis, and global popular culture. Two of his books--The Hurt Business: Oliver Mayer's Early Works Plus, and Homer From Salinas: John Steinbeck's Enduring Voice for the Californias—were both published by SDSU Press's Hyperbole Books imprint.

His most well-known book Tex[t]-Mex: Seductive Hallucinations of the "Mexican" in America (University of Texas 2006), deals with popular representation of Mexican and Mexican-American identity. It was named ‘Outstanding Academic Title’ 2007 by the American Library Association in the category of film studies.

== Awards ==
San Diego State University, College of Arts and Letters, Tenured Faculty Teaching Award, 2013-2014.

American Library Association Outstanding Academic Title in Film Studies, 2007
Nominee, U.S. Professor of the Year award, The Carnegie Foundation for the Advancement of Teaching, Fall 1999
Nominee, Most Influential Professor, Quest For the Best, Office of the Vice President, San Diego State University, Spring 1999
Associated Students’ "Outstanding Faculty," The Associated Student Government of SDSU, San Diego State University, 1994-1994

== Selected works ==
- Talking #BrownTV: Latinas and Latinos on the Screen. Columbus: Ohio State University Press, 2019 (ISBN 978-0-8142-5559-9)
- Tex[t]-Mex: Seductive Hallucinations of the "Mexican" in America. Austin: University of Texas Press, 2006 (ISBN 978-0-292-71457-1)
- Homer From Salinas: John Steinbeck's Enduring Voice for California. San Diego: The San Diego State University Press, 2009 (ISBN 978-1-879691-89-6)
- The Hurt Business: Oliver Mayer's Early Works [+] Plus a Portfolio of Plays, Essays, Interviews, Souvenirs, Ephemera, and Photography. San Diego, Hyperbole Books, 2008 (ISBN 978-1-879691-84-1)

== Reviews of Tex[t]-Mex: Seductive Hallucinations of the Mexican in America ==
- Aztlán: A Journal of Chicano Studies. Spring 2008.
- "The Seductive Style of a Tex-Mex Cultural Critic." A Contra/Corriente. Fall 2007.
- CHOICE: Current Reviews for Academic Libraries. October 2007.
- Morales, Amanda L. (April 2008). "Tex[t]-Mex: Seductive Hallucinations of the "Mexican" in America (review)". The Americas. 64 (4): 634–635. doi:10.1353/tam.2008.0053. S2CID 144260437.
- Garica, Adriana (Aug 2, 2007). "Stereotypes dominate U.S. views of Latinos". Reuters.
- Peña Ovalle, Priscilla (Fall 2007). "The Seductive Style of a Tex-Mex Cultural Critic". A Contracorriente. 5 (1): 304–309.
- Aldama, Frederick Luis (March 2008). "Book Review." MELUS: Multi-Ethnic Literature of the United States. 33 (1): 183-185. Retrieved 17 October 2017. ^{14}

== Graphic Design and MEXtasy Art Director/Designer ==
In addition to this academic career, Nericcio is also a graphic designer. His work includes book covers, film posters, and websites, most notably for SDSU Press and Hyperbole Books, where he oversees the production of cultural studies tomes. His Text-Mex Galleryblog investigates the pathological interrogation of Mexican, Latina/o, Chicana/o, "Hispanic," Mexican-American, and Latin American stereotypes, political, and cultural issues. In late 2010, Nericcio began a text-image exhibition entitled "MEXtasy," which has been displayed at numerous institutions.

=== MEXtasy Exhibitions (Abridged Listing) ===
==== 2020 ====
The Mextasy exhibition, in addition to screenings of the Mextasy TV pilot, will be featured at the University of Detroit, Mercy, and the University of Michigan, March, 2020.

==== 2019 ====
The Mextasy exhibition will be featured from Sept 10 to October 30, 2019 at the Multicultural Center, Memorial Union, Iowa State University.

==== 2018 ====
Franklin and Marshall College, March 28, 2018, hosted by the Department of Spanish and Linguistics

==== 2017 ====
San Diego State University hosted by SDSU's Malcolm A. Love Library

==== 2016 ====
University of Pennsylvania hosted by MEChA de Penn, Mex@Penn, & SHPE

University of Arizona's Department of Spanish and Portuguese Annual Graduate and Professional Symposium on Hispanic and Luso-Brazilian Literature, Language and Culture at the Arizona Historical Society Museum and at the University of Arizona main campus

==== 2015 ====
University of California, San Diego hosted by The Filmatic Festival

==== 2014 ====
University of Illinois Urbana-Champaign at La Casa Cultura Latina
Department of Communications and the Chicano Studies at University of Texas at El Paso

==== 2012 ====
Ohio State University
University of Guelph, Guelph, Ontario
theFront, San Ysidro, California (as Xicanoholic)

- Xicanoholic Lucha Libre: Gustavo Arellano and Bill Nericcio at theFRONT (Video)

Ethnic Studies Department, University of Colorado at Boulder
Western University, London, Ontario
Adrian College
University of California, Los Angeles
Boise State University

==== 2011 ====
Kamakakūokalani Center for Hawaiian Studies, University of Hawaiʻi at Mānoa
Fullerton Public Library (hosted by Gustavo Arellano), Fullerton, California San Antonio College, San Antonio, Texas
The Centro Cultural de La Raza, in Balboa Park, San Diego, California
Department of American Studies, University of Michigan
Casa Familiar, in San Ysidro, California (as Xicanoholic)

==== 2010 ====
South Texas College's Pecan campus Art Gallery
The Laredo Center of the Arts at Laredo, Texas

== Interviews ==
Gooch, Catherine; et al. (April 24, 2015). "Transnational Lives with William Nericcio". Social Theory Lectures.

Vasquez, Perry (September 14, 2013). "The Clean, Curious Eyeball of Bill Nericcio". San Diego Free press.

== See also ==
- American Literature
- Comparative Literature
- Cultural Studies
- Literary theory
- Film Studies
