= The Mother/Child Papers =

- First edition
- Author: Alicia Suskin Ostriker
- Language: English
- Genre: Poetry
- Publisher: Momentum Press (1980); Beacon Press (1986); University of Pittsburgh Press (2009)
- Publication place: United States
- Media type: Print (paperback)
- Pages: 65 pp (recent paperback edition)
- ISBN: 0-8229-6033-8 (recent paperback edition)

The Mother/Child Papers is Alicia Ostriker’s fourth book of poetry. It was originally published by Momentum Press in 1980 and was re-published in 1986 and 2009. The book is divided into four sections, and draws inspiration from the events of the Vietnam War era and Ostriker's personal experiences with motherhood. In the work, Ostriker juxtaposes meditations on war against musings of motherhood and the experience of birth. The many verses and prose pieces that comprise the book contrasts a woman's roles as teacher, mother, and wife, with the violence, corruption, and death of war.

== Background ==
Ostriker began composing The Mother/Child Papers after the birth of her son, a few days following the shooting of four students at Kent State. In the work, Ostriker chronicles her fears of bringing a son into the brutal modern world with so many expectations and pre-constructed notions of what makes a great man, especially during wartime. The title of the work similarly emphasizes its historic position by echoing The Pentagon Papers. The Mother/Child Papers explores such topics as women's strengths, the joys and frustration of parenthood, shock and outrage over war, and the destruction of the natural environment, and challenges typical notions of mother-child relationships, female experience, and sexual perceptions of women.

== Summary ==
=== I: Cambodia ===
The books begins with a lengthy prose section in which Ostriker recalls the events of her son, Gabriel's, May 14, 1970, birth and relates it to political developments that occurred around that time, most notably the Kent State Shootings and the beginning of Operation Total Victory, the United States invasion of Cambodia. The three events are described in tandem, with each intertwined with the others.

Ostriker then tells of the births of her two older daughters. One was delivered in a progressive Wisconsin hospital and another by midwife in England. Ostriker says that these two experiences shaped her expectation of what childbirth should be like: “a woman gives birth to a child, and the medical folk assist her.”

Ostriker then speaks of the birth of her third child, Gabriel, at a southern California traditional hospital. Despite having reached an agreement with her doctor about what drugs she was to be given during the procedure, while in the early stages of labor Ostriker inadvertently consented to being injected with Demerol, a sedative, thinking it was a local analgesic. Under the effects of the Demerol, Ostriker then consented to receive a spinal anesthetic, which left her unable to feel anything from the waist down. Upon waking, Ostriker was furious about being deprived of the experience of natural childbirth and relates the invasion of her body by the medical professionals who delivered the child to the US invasion of Cambodia.

=== II: Mother/Child ===
The second section of the book is a series of related, untitled stream-of-consciousness poems alternating between the new mother and the child's perspective. In these sections, Ostriker explores the intimate, even erotic, relationship between a mother and her infant child. She expresses the different emotions she experienced towards the child during this time, from blissful admiration and boundless optimism, to bitter resentment and a wish that the “leech” would “die”.

There are also a number of short prose sections in which Ostriker relates the events of the Kent State shooting and the immediate aftermath of Gabriel's birth. References to war and devastation pervade both accounts; as Ostriker muses on the beauty of her child, she suddenly thinks of “babies stabbed in their little bellies / and hoisted up to the sky on bayonets”. The section ends with two titled pieces: “Paragraphs,” a prose piece in which Ostriker examines the range of emotions new mothers feel towards their infants, ranging from almost divine love to murderous rage, and “Mother/Child: A Coda,” in which she dispenses advice about life and consciousness to her child, alerting him to its savage, brutal nature, as well as its potential for transcendent beauty.

=== III: The Spaces ===
The third part of the book is the longest and is composed of a series of 16 titled prose and poetry pieces exploring life with the new child and its effects on the family. In “Letter to M.” the speaker discusses the erotic pleasure inherent in nursing a child and ponders why this is never discussed in any parenting material. The poem “Song of the Abandoned One” is written from the perspective of the infant's jealous and angry older sibling, begging her parents to “Kill the baby”. Ostriker recounts an experience with her family listening to a production of Shakespeare’s Macbeth on the radio in “Macbeth and the Kids In the Cabin at Chester.” In “Things to Remember of Eve,” Ostriker describes her daughter, Eve Ostriker, at two different stages in her life, at ages 8 and 21. In “In the Autumn of My Thirty-Seventh Birthday,” Ostriker describes the sense of emptiness and depression she experienced dealing with family life, recounting also a discussion with a depressed friend, N., who refuses to take the antidepressants her psychiatrist prescribed her. In “Exile,” Ostriker considers the contrasting powers of love and violence, wondering when her son will grow to the point where “he will turn away” from his mother's kisses “not to waste breath.” The poem's post-script reads, “during the evacuation of Phnom Penh, 1975.”

In the section's titular prose piece, “The Spaces,” Ostriker recalls an ideal “windy, snowy January evening” at home with her children. Throughout the poem, there are a number of allusions to William Blake’s Songs of Innocence, as well as a repeated lamb motif. Ostriker’s perfect winter day with her children is contrasted with her husband’s discussion about entropy and the ultimate heat death of the universe.

The next poem, “Propaganda Poem: Maybe For Some Young Mamas” is divided into three parts. In the first part, “The Visiting Poet,” Ostriker recounts an experience she once had giving a guest lecture to a class of feminist college students. She read the class a poem about pregnancy and was shocked when the class reacted with revulsion to the notion of motherhood. Ostriker tries to explain that motherhood is one of the most fulfilling and empowering experiences possible for a woman to experience and that the class has been thoroughly brainwashed against it through patriarchal messages. In part two, “Postscript to Propaganda,” Ostriker acknowledges that raising children is an incredibly difficult and demanding experience which wears a mother down, but she concludes the poem by asking the audience, “Come on, you daughters of bitches, do you want to live forever?” The poem's last part, “What Actually,” indicts the “ideological lockstep” that Ostriker claims dictates women's feelings on motherhood. She goes on to explain that she believes that certain women are born to be mothers, while others simply were not. She concludes by once more acknowledging that although raising children wears away at a person, so does anything enjoyable in life, and that those who refuse to do anything dangerous are “already dead.”

In “The Leaf Pile,” Ostriker recounts the events of an October day when, upon catching her son trying to put something dirty in his mouth, she slapped him. The poem explores the workings of memory and how such events can be easily forgotten by the child but remain a vivid mark of shame for the parent. The next work is a prose piece titled “The Seven Samurai, The Dolly, and Mary Cassatt.” Ostriker remembers an evening watching Akira Kurosawa’s The Seven Samurai, trying to compare it to other masculine art works in an attempt to come to a better understanding of the male perspective. She is interrupted by her children coming to her asking for attention and assistance. She recalls a quote by W. B. Yeats about how one must choose between the perfection of one’s craft and one's life before going to help her daughter with her report on Mary Cassatt. The next poem, “The Change” explores the relationship between animate and inanimate things how it parallels the distant relationship Ostriker's daughter maintains with her as they drive to her horseback riding lessons. In “One, To Fly,” Ostriker examines the transformation of her son Gabriel as he grows up. In nursery school, he tells her that his three wishes are to be able to fly, to be able to talk to animals, and for there to be no more war. The poem's last stanza reveals that at age 9, Gabriel has largely lost his pacifist nature due to bullying and social pressures and now fights children who bully him. “In the Dust,” the section's penultimate poem, deals with the development of Ostriker's daughter and examines the mother's own role in helping mold her daughter into an acceptable woman in society's eyes, even if that role has made the mother personally unhappy. In the last poem of the section, “His Speed and Strength,” Ostriker meditates on seeing her son at play, overtaking her on his bicycle, using his strength for a purely creative purpose. She also sees a group of black and white children playing together without any tension and thinks to herself that maybe “it is not necessary to make hate.”

=== IV: This Power ===
The book's last section is composed of three poems, “One Marries,” “This Power,” and “Dream.” “One Marries” begins with a quote from Percy Shelley’s Hymn to Intellectual Beauty, “To fear himself, and love all human kind.” In this poem, Ostriker meditates upon the dynamics of marriage, comparing its necessity for balance to the crude, simple domination of Imperialism. In “This Power,” Ostriker considers the respect and attraction children feel towards their mothers, even in the most degrading and trying circumstances. “Dream,” the book's last poem is very brief and describes“a woman / oliveskinned like an Indian / brownhaired like a European” “giving birth / comfortabl[y]” for days on end.

== Critical reception ==
The Mother/Child Papers enjoyed fairly favorable reception upon its release. The Iowa Review said, “It is startling to read the early pages of this book: where, before this, was the literature of squalid bliss and righteous woe of taking care of an infant? It is alive in Ostriker . . . one of the most intelligent and lyrical of American poets.” The American Poetry Review said, “Ostriker's work details the achievement of a connection between personal history and public fact as both present themselves to a very intelligent writer . . . Nothing in the novels of Margaret Drabble is as affecting, as convincing, as a few lines of Ostriker's.”

In the years after the initial release of The Mother/Child Papers, it has come to be regarded as an extremely influential book in feminist circles. Upon its 2009 republishing, poet Eleanor Wilner remarked, “So many women shed shame and took heart from The Mother/Child Papers, which feels as fresh and necessary as ever- feminism without dogma, motherhood without sanctimony, the power of the pen dipped in blood: this time not of battle but of birth. Rejoicing at its return, I recall how far this book-awakening us to all that had been left out of literature-was ahead of the curve: gravity's rainbow, the trajectory of a culture's once heaven-bound imagination, headed back to Earth.”
