= Throwing Knives =

- First edition
- Author: Molly Best Tinsley
- Language: English
- Publication date: 2000

Throwing Knives is a collection of short stories by Molly Best Tinsley, first published on 1 February 2000. It was awarded the 2001 Oregon Book Award for fiction, as well as the 1999 Sandstone Prize in Short Fiction offered by the Ohio State University Press.
