= Empire of Dreams (poetry collection) =

1988 epic poetry book by Giannina Braschi

Empire of Dreams (Spanish: El imperio de los sueños, 1988) is a postmodern poetry epic by Puerto Rican author Giannina Braschi, who is considered "one of the most revolutionary voices in Latin American literature today".

Love, liberty, inspiration, immigration, gender fluidity, and creativity are the main themes of Empire of Dreams, an ode to New York City.

== Subject, structure, themes ==
The narrator journeys through a "phantasmagoria of internal and external trials in order to experience the center—of political power, of meaning, of feeling, and of personal identity".

The central axis is the immigrant's new life in the "Big Apple", which is dramatized by Braschi as the epicenter of the American Dream. Social and linguistic references to Latin American cities also abound, such as "the Latin American Quarter in Paris, the barrio chino barcelonés, the zaguanes of Borges's Buenos Aires, and the colonial houses in Old San Juan".

There are three parts and a total of six books of poetry within Empire of Dreams. This structure, which nestles books within books, has been compared to the concept of a Chinese box and the Matryoshka doll. The work is a hybrid of genres: prose poetry, drama, musical theater, manifesto, gossip, autobiography, diary, literary theory, and antinovel.

=== Part One: "Assault on Time" ===
"Assault on Time" muses on love lost and the ineptitude of language and grammar to communicate emotions. The work debuted in 1980 as Braschi's first book of poetry in Spanish (Asalto al tiempo, Barcelona). The book begins with the breaking of silence: "Behind the word is silence./Behind what sounds is the door". Letters take on a life of their own, roaming the streets of New York, and punctuation marks, such as colons and semicolons, denote pivotal points in a relationship.

=== Part Two: "Profane Comedy" ===
La Comedia profana debuted in Spanish as Braschi's second poetry collection in 1985. The works pays homage to the evolution of poetry and performance, especially comedia dell'arte. "Profane Comedy" is composed of four books of poetry, each with humor and a touch of the grotesque: 1. "Book of Clowns and Buffoons", 2. "Poems of the World; or The Book of Wisdom", 3. "Pastoral; or, The Inquisition of Memories", and 4. "Song of Nothingness".

Braschi mixes television jingles and pop songs by The Beatles and Madonna with poems of the English and Spanish Golden Age. References include Luis de León, Miguel de Cervantes, Lope de Vega, Luis de Góngora, Garcilaso de la Vega, and Francisco Quevedo, while cameo appearances are made by poets, painters, philosophers, and composers, such as: César Vallejo, Rimbaud, Goethe, Nietzsche, Shakespeare, Breughal, Beethoven, Van Gogh, and Picasso. She liberally quotes from classical poets, transformed by her use of the "sampling technique of rap music" and hip hop. Braschi writes from a literary tradition and an erudite standpoint, but "she imbues her text with jollity and a brilliant energy".

The text unfolds through a series of violent and surreal theatrical scenes performed by clowns, buffoons, shepherds, lead soldiers, magicians, madmen, witches, and fortune tellers. These gender-bending immigrant characters attack and occupy the American mainstream, including business centers and tourist attractions. In a climactic episode of "Pastoral; or, the Inquisition of Memories", shepherds cause traffic jams on 5th Avenue during the Puerto Rican Day Parade, ring the bells of St. Patrick's Cathedral, and take over the observation deck of the Empire State Building. There they dance and sing: "Now we do whatever we please, whatever we please, whatever we damn well please".

=== Part Three: "Intimate Diary of Solitude" ===
The Intimate Diary of Solitude is a lighthearted antinovel about a poet's search for love and fame during the Cold War of the Reagan Era. The work is a mash-up of flash fiction, pop songs, tabloid, commercial, diary, and manifesto, closing with a philosophical treatise on the writer's role in the modern age. The heroine Mariquita Samper, a Macy's make-up artist who dreams of being a star, calls for a revolution of "poetic eggs" and shoots the narrator, who keeps rewriting her own diary in order to turn it into a bestseller. The work pokes fun at the narrative techniques and somber tones of Latin American Boom and dictator novels. The debate between quality and originality versus fame and fortune is a comic refrain in Empire of Dreams. Braschi writes, in the chapter entitled "Mariquita Samper's Childhood":

The Narrator suggested I write a book entitled Mariquita Samper’s Childhood. He’d pay me a million dollars for the rights. I’d have to say that I had a miserable childhood. In short, I portrayed myself as an orphan. My parents are thugs—I said in Mariquita Samper’s Childhood. Of course, I became a heroine to the American public. Little Orphan Mariquita. Daughter of those filthy thugs who stripped her of her American citizenship. And yet, in spite of all its lies, the book was a best-seller in the U.S. and Russia. Remember—said the Narrator—that Mariquita had asked for asylum at the Russian embassy. She wrote a letter to the Russians stating that she wanted to be a communist. She had been mistaken. She had realized the value of Russian citizenship, especially as a Puerto Rican. My confusion lies in the fact that I’m a sad colony.

The work closes with a quotation from an anonymous poem of Medieval Spanish literature, a line from "El Conde Arnaldos": "I only sing my song/to whomever follows me".

== Influences ==
Braschi credits T.S. Eliot's "The Waste Land" as the single most influential English-language poem to inform the rhythmic shifts and the inspiration from which she creates a chorus of anonymous voices to capture the collective conscience of the masses. Alicia Ostriker notes in the introduction to Empire of Dreams that the poet's voice sounds decidedly "macho" and yet it can be theoretically "paired with Luisa Valenzuela, Clarice Lispector, Luce Irigaray, Hélène Cixous, and Marguerite Duras, and obviously she owes a great deal to Gertrude Stein".

Braschi has published scholarly articles on Spanish-language poetry by Cervantes, Garcilaso, Antonio Machado, Federico García Lorca, and César Vallejo; and a book on Gustavo Adolfo Bécquer. In an interview with NBC Latino, Braschi identified her favorite poet as César Vallejo: "Vallejo is a jack-in-the-box who performs the movement of my spirit. No matter how much you push him down into the box, the poet always bounces back to affirm his love for life".

== Giannina Braschi ==
Giannina Braschi, a National Endowment for the Arts fellow, is considered a revolutionary voice in contemporary Latin American literature. She is the subject of Poets, Philosophers, Lovers: On the Writings of Giannina Braschi, a scholarly anthology edited by Frederick Luis Aldama, Tess O'Dwyer, and Ilan Stavans. Braschi is the author of the Spanglish novel Yo-Yo Boing!, and the postcolonial tragicomedy United States of Banana (2011). Her work explores the politics of empire and independence, while capturing the trials and tribulations of the American immigrants. She has won awards and grants from the National Endowment for the Arts, New York Foundation for the Arts, PEN American Center, Ford Foundation, InterAmericas, Danforth Scholarship, Reed Foundation, El Diario, Rutgers University, and Puerto Rican Institute for Culture. Empire of Dreams was translated by Tess O'Dwyer as the first volume of the Yale Library of World Literature in Translation in 1994. With the publication of United States of Banana, CARAS Magazine named Braschi one of the most influential Puerto Ricans in 2012.

== See also ==
- American poetry
- Caribbean poetry
- Experimental theater
- Latino poetry
- McOndo
- Nuyorican movement
- Postcolonial literature
- Postmodern literature
- Puerto Rican literature
