= Doris Sommer =

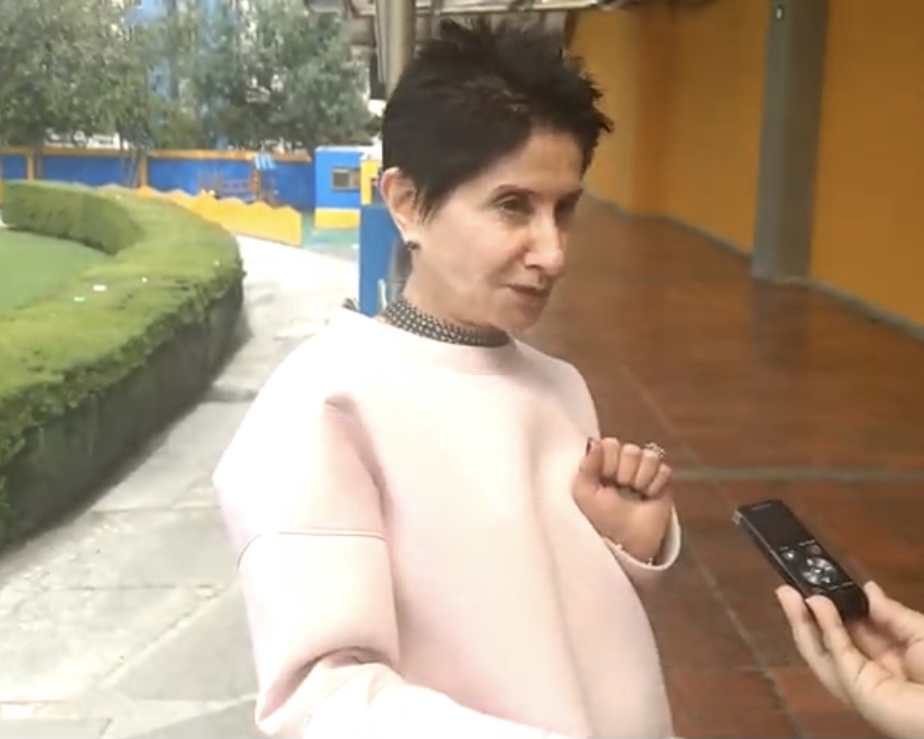
Doris Sommer Ph.D (Rutgers) interviewed in 2017

Doris Sommer (born January 15, 1947) is a literature scholar. She is Ira Jewell Williams, Jr., Professor of Romance Languages and Literatures and of African and African American Studies at Harvard University. She is also Director of the Cultural Agents Initiative at Harvard. Sommer received her PhD from Rutgers University.

In 1994, she was a Guggenheim fellow in Latin America literature.

In February 2022, Sommer was one of 38 Harvard faculty to sign a letter to the Harvard Crimson defending Professor John Comaroff, who had been found to have violated the university's sexual and professional conduct policies. The letter defended Comaroff as "an excellent colleague, advisor and committed university citizen" and expressed dismay over his being sanctioned by the university. After students filed a lawsuit with detailed allegations of Comaroff's actions and the university's failure to respond, Sommer was one of several signatories to say that she wished to retract her signature.

== Works ==
- One Master for Another: Populism as Patriarchal Rhetoric in Dominican Novels (University Press of America, 1984)
- ed. with Andrew Parker, Mary Russo, and Patricia Yaeger, Nationalisms & Sexualities (Routledge, 1991)
- Foundational Fictions: The National Romances of Latin America (University of California Press, 1991); in Spanish: Ficciones fundacionales: La novela nacional en América Latina (FCE, 2005)
- Yo-Yo Boing!: Either And with Alex Vega Merino (Latin American Literary Review Press, 1998).
- ed. The Places of History: Regionalism Revisited in Latin America (Duke University Press, 1999)
- Proceed with Caution, when engaged by minority writing in the Americas (Harvard University Press, 1999); in Spanish: Abrazos y rechazos: Cómo leer en clave menor (FCE, 2006)
- ed. Bilingual Games (Palgrave, 2003)
- Bilingual Aesthetics: A New Sentimental Education (Duke University Press, 2004)
- ed. Cultural Agency in the Americas (Duke University Press, 2006)
- The Work of Art in the World: Civic Agency and Public Humanities (Duke University Press, 2014)
