= Ingelin Angerborn =

Swedish author (born 1966)

- Born: 1966 (age 59–60); Gothenburg, Västergötland, Sweden
- Occupation: Author
- Writing career
- Genre: Children's literature
- Website: www.ingelin.se

Ingelin Angerborn, born 1966 in Gothenburg, is a Swedish author. Angerborn, who writes children's books, made her debut with the picture book Pelle Pyton på friarstråt (2002), illustrated by Eva-Lena Rehnmark (born 1973). About the girl Tilda, who does everything wrong though it still gets right in the end, is a comic series with titles as Om jag bara inte råkat göra pappa till astronaut (2004), Om jag bara inte råkat säga sanningen (2005) and Om jag bara inte råkat klippa taxfrisyr (2007).

Pussar och P.S. (2006), Kramar och krångel (2007) and Hjärtslag och hjärnsläpp (2008) are a tender suite of books about friendship and tingling love. About the super secret club Klant & kompani are a series that began with Kartkatastrofen (2009), and illustrated by Jenny Karlsson (born 1983). Angerborn has also published thrillers for young readers: För alltid - (2009), Sorgfjäll (2010) and Rum 213 (2011).

In an interview she said that she gets her inspiration from and writes about many things 'the idea to room 213 I got from a license plate on a car that was parked outside the house where I live'.

== Bibliography ==
- Pelle Pyton på friarstråt (Eriksson & Lindgren, 2002)
- Om jag bara inte råkat göra pappa till astronaut (Tiden, 2004)
- Eskil och ensamsakerna (2004)
- Om jag bara inte råkat byta ut tant Doris hund (Tiden, 2005)
- Om jag bara inte råkat säga sanningen (Tiden, 2005)
- Om jag bara inte råkat köpa ett marsvin (Tiden, 2006)
- Pussar och P.S. (Tiden, 2006)
- Eskil och tanden som försvann (2006)
- Om jag bara inte råkat klippa taxfrisyr (Tiden, 2007)
- Kramar och krångel (Tiden, 2007)
- Önskestjärnan (Tiden, 2008)
- Hjärtslag och hjärnsläpp (Tiden, 2008)
- Kartkatastrofen (Tiden, 2009)
- Klockkatastrofen (Tiden, 2009)
- För alltid ... (Tiden, 2009)
- Sorgfjäril (rabén&sjögren, 2010)

== See also ==
- Swedish children's literature
