= David Nessle =

Swedish comic creator (born 1960)

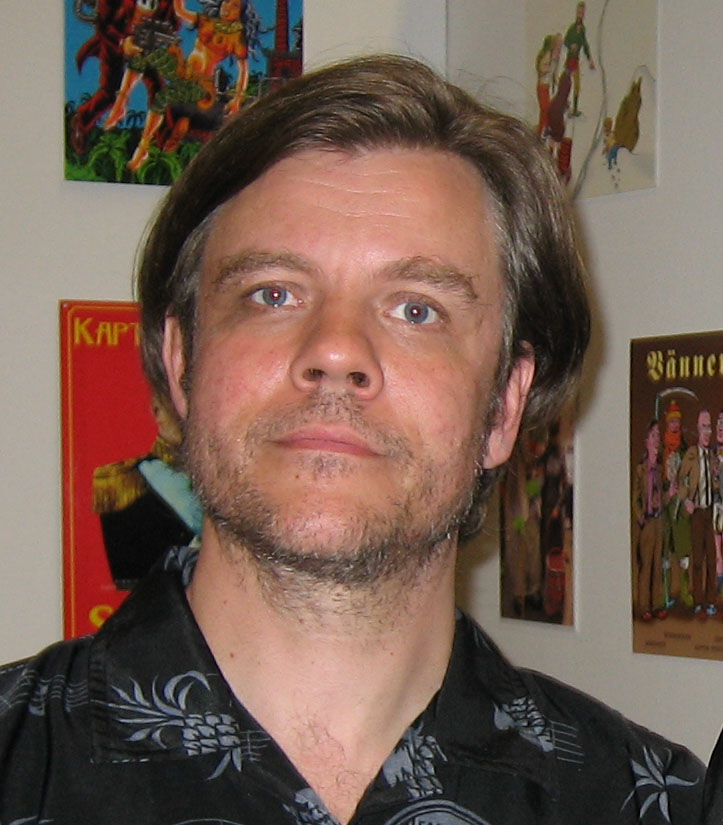
David Nessle in Gothenburg, Sweden, 2006

David Nessle (born 1960) is a Swedish comic creator, known for his semi-philosophical comics such as Döden Steker En Flamingo, as well as adolescent humor funnies like John Holmes & Sherlock Watson (the latter in collaboration with Joakim Lindengren). He has been published in magazines such as Galago, Mega-Pyton and Kapten Stofil, and in several comic albums. David was for many years active in the Swedish Science fiction fandom and the creator of several fanzines. He was also the founder and front figure of the Sala-based band "Geggamoja Übermench och det heterosexuella närstridskommandot".
