= Michael Somoroff =

American sculptor

Michael Somoroff is a conceptual artist, director, and photographer. Somoroff has directed and created work for advertising agencies, publications and cultural institutions. He is also a teacher and cultural commentator who has worked for Stony Brook University, The University of the Arts, The Rothko Chapel and the International Center of Photography.

== Early life ==
Somoroff's father, Ben Somoroff, was a still-life photographer whose works were exhibited at the Museum of Modern Art. Somoroff spent much of his youth at his father's studio, on 54th street in New York City. He became his father's studio manager and worked with the many artists who frequented the studio.

== Photography and Film Projects ==
In 1979, the first exhibition of Somoroff's photography was held at the International Center of Photography in New York City, under the supervision of Cornell Capa.

Somoroff worked for magazines such as Life, Vogue, Harper's Bazaar, and Stern, in Europe and the US.

Somoroff photographed his mentors in photography Gyula Halász, better known as Brassaï, Andreas Feininger, Louis Faurer, and André Kertész and published the portraits in A Moment. Master Photographers: Portraits that was selected as Best Book of the Year by American Photo. Milton Glaser got him his first assignment for New York magazine.

Somoroff began directing films and became "a specialist in the little-known world of tabletop directing."

In 2006, Somoroff created a large-scale outdoor installation, Illumination I, for the Rothko Chapel in Houston. The New York Times describes his approach as "Madison Avenue meets the Italian Renaissance: big budgets, large teams, high-tech tools and an artist-manager equally at ease with corporate sponsors and Chelsea gallerists." A companion piece to Somoroff's installation Illumination, Illumination (2007) is an album by the American ambient musician Robert Rich. On the occasion of the installation's move to The Aldrich Contemporary Art Museum in Ridgefield, CT, the audio track to Somoroff's Illumination, was presented as a multimedia installation by BravinLee Programs (2007). The sculpture was last exhibited at Art OMI in 2008.

In 2008, Somoroff created a site-specific installation of the parting of the Red Sea in wood and video projects at St. Peter's Art Station Cathedral in Cologne, Germany.

Absence of Subject, Somoroff's "unconventional homage" to photographer August Sander, was first presented during the 2011 Venice Biennale on Piazza San Marc.

Somoroff's work is held in art collections of Museum of Modern Art, Museum of Fine Arts, Houston; Smithsonian Institution, Washington, D.C.; and Museo Correr; it has been exhibited at the International Center of Photography; Los Angeles County Museum of Art; San Francisco Museum of Modern Art; and Museum of Contemporary Art Chicago.

In 2011, Somoroff produced a series of short videos of poet Giannina Braschi reading from United States of Banana, a work of Postcolonial literature;.

Somoroff is an official "artist in residence" at the Wyss Translational Center Zurich.

In 2014 Somoroff was hired as President of The Longaberger Company in Newark, Ohio. He left the position after six months.

== Publications by Somoroff ==
- The Vegetables Series. International Center of Photography, 1985.
- Kinder in Europa. Nicolai, 1988 ISBN 9783875842227.
- Image of the Not-Seen: Search for Understanding. The Rothko Chapel Art Series, 2005. ISBN 0945472048.
- Michael Somoroff: Illumination I, Rothko Chapel, Rothko Chapel Books, 2008. ISBN 9780979091605.
- Absence of Subject. Walter König, 2011. ISBN 978-0983615606.
- A Moment. Master Photographers, Portraits by Michael Somoroff. Damiani, 2012. ISBN 9788862082112.
- Two Crowns of The Egg. Michael Somoroff, Donald Kuspit, Giannina Braschi, Damiani, 2014. ISBN 9788862083539.

== Exhibitions ==
- 1979: Vegetable Series, International Center of Photography, New York, NY
- 1985: Olympus Galerie, Hamburg, Germany
- 2006: Illumination, Rothko Chapel, Houston, Texas, 2006; Illumination, The Aldrich Contemporary Art Museum, Ridgefield, CT, 2007; BravinLee Programs, Chelsea, New York City, NY, 2007; Illumination, OMI International Art Center, Sculpture park, Ghent, NY, 2008;
- 2007: Vitamin W, The Wonder Factor, Newark, NJ
- 2008: The Red Sea, Kunst-Station Sankt Peter, Köln, Germany
- 2008: Genesis, Video Animation during Easter Mass, Kunst-Station Sankt Peter, Köln, Germany
- 2008: The Absence of the Subject, Fotofest Houston, Offsite, Houston, Texas, 2008; Piazza San Marco, on the occasion of the Venice Biennale, Italy, 2011; Villa Brandolini F4 Un’Idea di Fotografia, Solighetto-Treviso, Italy, 2012; Galleri Image, Aarhus, Denmark, 2012; Fondazione Stelline, Milan, Italy, 2013; Centro de Arte la Regenta, Las Palmas de Gran Canaria, Spain, 2013; Tenerife Espacio de las Artes, Tenerife, Spain, 2013; Sala Municipal de Exposiciones de las Francesas, Valladolid, Spain, 2013; Museo Nacional des Artes Visuales, Montevideo, Uruguay, 2014; Encuentros Abiertos in Buenos Aires, Argentina, 2014; Sirius Arts Centre, Cork, Ireland, 2014; Benaki Museum, Athens, Greece, 2014; Villa Vauban, Luxembourg City Museum, 2015; Ruth Leuchter gallery, Düsseldorf, Germany, 2015.
- 2012: Tefillah I, Galerie Thomas Schulte, Berlin, Germany
- 2013: Master Photographers, Galerie Julian Sander, Bonn, Germany, 2013; Fondazione Francesco Fabbri, Treviso, Italy, 2014; Sol Mednick Gallery at the University of the Arts in Philadelphia, 2015.
