= Jeremiah P. Ostriker =

American astrophysicist (1937–2025)

Jerry Ostriker
- Born: Jeremiah Paul Ostriker; April 13, 1937; New York City, U.S.
- Died: April 6, 2025 (aged 87); New York City, U.S.
- Education: Harvard University; University of Chicago
- Known for: Astrophysicist; University administrator
- Spouse: Alicia Ostriker (m. 1958)
- Children: 3
- Awards: Helen B. Warner Prize for Astronomy (1972); National Medal of Science (2000); Gold Medal of the Royal Astronomical Society (2004); ForMemRS (2007); Bruce Medal (2011); James Craig Watson Medal (2012)
- Scientific career
- Workplaces: Columbia University; Princeton University; University of Cambridge
- Doctoral advisor: Subrahmanyan Chandrasekhar
- Doctoral students: Edmund Bertschinger; Ue-Li Pen; Scott Tremaine; Ellen Zweibel

Jeremiah Paul Ostriker (/ˌoʊˈstraɪkər/ oh-STRY-kər; April 13, 1937 – April 6, 2025) was an American astrophysicist and a professor of astronomy at Columbia University and a Charles A. Young Professor Emeritus at Princeton, where he also served as a senior research scholar. Ostriker also served as a university administrator as Provost of Princeton University.

== Early life and education ==
Ostriker was born on the Upper West Side of Manhattan to Martin Ostriker, the proprietor of a clothing company, and Jeanne (Sumpf) Ostriker, a public school teacher. He had three siblings. Ostriker became interested in science at a young age, and he later recounted teaching himself difficult subjects, including calculus, writing: "I felt that I learned better on my own than through school". He received his B.A. from Harvard and his PhD from the University of Chicago.

== Career and research ==
After earning his Ph.D. at Chicago, he conducted post-doctoral work at the University of Cambridge. From 1971 to 1995, Ostriker was a professor at Princeton, and served as Provost there from 1995 to 2001. From 2001 to 2003, he was appointed Plumian Professor of Astronomy and Experimental Philosophy at the Institute of Astronomy, Cambridge. He then returned to Princeton as the Charles Young Professor of Astronomy and later served as the Charles A. Young Professor Emeritus. He became a professor of astronomy at Columbia in 2012.

Ostriker was very influential in advancing the theory that most of the mass in the universe is not visible at all, but consists of dark matter. His research also focused on the interstellar medium, galaxy evolution, cosmology and black holes. On June 20, 2013 Ostriker was given the White House Champions of Change Award for his role in initiating the Sloan Digital Sky Survey project, which makes all of its astronomical data sets available publicly on the Internet.

Ostriker was also known for the Ostriker–Peebles criterion, relating to the stability of galactic formation.

== Personal life and death ==
Ostriker married noted poet and essayist Alicia Ostriker (née Suskin) in 1958, and they had three children: Rebecca, Eve, and Gabriel. Like her father, Eve became an astrophysics professor at Princeton University, in 2012, the same year as her father's retirement. Jeremiah and Alicia Ostriker were residents of Princeton, New Jersey.

Ostriker died of renal disease in Manhattan, on April 6, 2025, at the age of 87.

== Publications ==
As of April 2021, Ostriker's articles have been cited over 85,910 times and he has an h-index of 130 (130 papers with at least 130 citations) according to the NASA Astrophysics Data System including:

- "Precision Cosmology? Not Just Yet"
- Heart of Darkness, Unraveling the Mysteries of the Invisible Universe Princeton University Press (2013)
- New Light on Dark Matter, Science, 300, pp 1909–1914 (2003) doi:10.1126/Science.1085976
- The Probability Distribution Function of Light in the Universe: Results from Hydrodynamic Simulations, Astrophysical Journal 597, 1 (2003)
- Cosmic Mach Number as a Function of Overdensity and Galaxy Age, Astrophysical Journal, 553, 513 (2001)
- Collisional Dark Matter and the Origin of Massive Black Holes, Physical Review Letters, 84, 5258-5260 (2000).
- Hydrodynamics of Accretion onto Black Holes, Adv. Space Res., 7, 951-960 (1998). doi:10.1016/S0273-1177(98)00127-6

== Awards and honors ==
Ostriker won numerous awards and honors including:

- Membership of the National Academy of Sciences (1974)
- Membership of the American Academy of Arts and Sciences (1975)
- Helen B. Warner Prize for Astronomy of the American Astronomical Society (AAS) (1972)
- Henry Norris Russell Lectureship of the AAS (1980)
- INSA-Vainu Bappu Memorial Award (1993)
- Membership of the American Philosophical Society (1994)
- Foreign membership of the Royal Netherlands Academy of Arts and Sciences (1999)
- Karl Schwarzschild Medal (1999)
- National Medal of Science by U.S. president Bill Clinton (2000)
- Golden Plate Award of the American Academy of Achievement (2001)
- Gold Medal of the Royal Astronomical Society (2004)
- Elected a Foreign Member of the Royal Society (ForMemRS) in 2007
- Bruce Medal (2011)
- James Craig Watson Medal (2012)
- White House Champion of Change (2013)
- Gruber Prize in Cosmology (2015)
- Elected a Legacy Fellow of the American Astronomical Society in 2020.
