= Yo-Yo Boing! =

Spanglish book by Giannina Braschi

- First edition cover
- Author: Giannina Braschi
- Language: English, Spanish, Spanglish
- Series: Discovery
- Subject: Inspiration, poetry, creative process, democracy, Puerto Rican culture, writer's block, discrimination, racism, sexism, US colonialism
- Genre: Cross-genre; hysterical realism; metamodernism; satire; postmodernism; experimental fiction
- Published: Pittsburgh, Pennsylvania : Latin American Literary Review Press, 1998
- Media type: Book
- Pages: 205
- ISBN: 9780935480979
- OCLC: 39339100

Yo-Yo Boing! (1998) is a postmodern novel in English, Spanish, and Spanglish by Puerto Rican author Giannina Braschi. The cross-genre work is a structural hybrid of poetry, political philosophy, musical, manifesto, treatise, memoir, and drama. The work addresses tensions between Anglo-American and Hispanic-American cultures in the United States.

== Giannina Braschi ==
Giannina Braschi, a National Endowment for the Arts fellow, is considered an influential and "revolutionary voice" in contemporary Latin American literature. Braschi's Empire of Dreams is a postmodern poetry classic, first published in Spain in 1988. Her more recent work includes the postcolonial dramatic novel United States of Banana (2011). Braschi's collective work explores the politics of empire and independence, while capturing the trials and tribulations of the Latin American immigrant in the United States. With the republication of United States of Banana and her other works in 2011, CARAS Magazine ranked Braschi in 2012 as one of the most influential Puerto Ricans of the year.

== Description ==
Yo-Yo Boing! has many examples of the linguistic phenomena of code-switching between English and Spanish, as spoken by millions of Latinos and Hispanic-Americans in the United States and in Puerto Rico. It is the first full-length novel to use Spanglish as a high art form. The translingualism in this Latino narrative anticipated multicultural readers who could readily decode both languages in order to co-construct the storyworld.

Through dramatic dialogues and conversations among a nameless chorus of voices, the work treats subjects as diverse as racial, ethnic, and sexual prejudice, discrimination, colonialism, Puerto Rican independence, revolution, domestic violence, and writer's block. In the book, intellectuals and artists debate English-only laws, ethnic cleansing campaigns, and corporate censorship.

The dialogue also refers to popular culture, Latin American boom, films, sex, poetry, and Puerto Rican artistic expression in New York. Artists and celebrities such as Woody Allen, Almodovar, Michael Jackson, Madonna, Pavarotti, Martin Scorsese, Fellini, Pee-Wee Herman, and Nabokov are celebrated and derided.

== Reception ==
Marc Zimmerman qualified the reception of Yo-Yo Boing! by Latin American scholars as "a work heralded by such gurus as Jean Franco, Doris Sommer, and Diamela Eltit and seen as the most complex and experimental of US Puerto Rican fiction yet to be written." Frederick Luis Aldama stated, "Braschi is recognized as one of today's foremost experimental Latinx authors. Braschi's vibrant, bilingually shaped creative expressions and innovation spring from her Latinidad, her Puerto Rican-ness. (In this work) we discover as much about US/Puerto Rico sociopolitical histories as we encounter the metaphysical and existential explorations of a Cervantes, Rabelais, Diderot, Artaud, Joyce, Beckett, Stein, Borges, Cortázar, and Rosario Castellanos." In "Yo-Yo Boing! and Its Critical Reception," Christopher Gonzalez noted the early reviews published in English by monolingual reviewers were "at once laudatory and hesitant." Publishers Weekly called it "a literary liberation and a frustrating challenge" and Kirkus Reviews called it "a fractious comic novel by Braschi, a highly praised Puerto Rican poet... This in-your-face assertion of the vitality of Latino culture has many agreeable moments, but—let’s face it—how much of its potential readership will be able to understand more than half of it?" Gonzalez posits that "because Braschi owns every aspect of her story-world blueprint due to her equal mastery and fluency in Spanish and English," non-Spanish speaking reviewers considered the work "an affront." Whereas, he notes that bilingual reviewers, such as David William Foster in Review of Contemporary Fiction praised Yo-Yo Boing! for its "superb exploration for the lived experiences of Hispanics." Debra A. Castillo qualified the work's artistry in this way, “While the author may write big books in terms of the traditional expectations about the poetic genre, she is as concerned about the microlevel of her work as the most highly elaborated lyricist. Braschi’s attention to tone and rhythm, to the music of her text, is extreme.” Harold Augenbraum, Ilan Stavans, Doris Sommer, Adriana Estill, Christopher Gonzalez, and other critics have used the phrase "a tour de force" to describe Yo-Yo Boing!

Ilan Stavans stated in Spanglish, "I have always visto a Giannina Braschi como mi heroína. And I’m an adicto... There is something mágico in her juego de palabras, her exploration of tenses, her anxious, uncompromising bilingüismo que ni es de aquí ni es de aquí ni es de allá, ni tiene age ni porvenir, y ser feliz es su color, su identity. Braschi crea una lexicography that is and isn’t atrapada en el presente.” Stavans was among the first professors to teach Yo-Yo Boing! (Amherst 2002) and dedicate a conference to Spanglish literature (Amherst 2004). Nearly 20 years later, in 2020, Yo-Yo Boing! was now on the course syllabus for classes in Spanglish, bilingualism, linguistics, Latino/a Literature, Puerto Rican studies, Nuyorican poetry, Latin American fiction, experimental literature, and avant-garde theater and performance.
