= Eve Ostriker =

American astrophysicist (born 1965)

Eve C. Ostriker
- Born: 1965 (age 60–61)
- Education: University of California, Berkeley; Harvard University
- Scientific career
- Thesis: Externally-Driven Gravitational Torques on Disk/Star Systems
- Doctoral advisor: Frank Shu
- Website: https://web.astro.princeton.edu/people/eve-ostriker

Eve Charis Ostriker (born 1965) is an American astrophysicist, known for her research on star formation and on related topics involving superbubbles, molecular clouds, young stars, computational fluid dynamics, and supersonic turbulence. She is a professor in the Department of Astrophysical Sciences of Princeton University.

== Education and career ==
Ostriker is the daughter of astrophysicist Jeremiah P. Ostriker and poet Alicia Ostriker. She graduated magna cum laude from Harvard College in 1987, and after a year as a visiting student at the University of Oxford, went to the University of California, Berkeley for graduate studies in physics. There, she earned a master's degree in 1990 and completed her Ph.D. in 1993. Her doctoral dissertation, Gravitational Torques on Star-Disk Systems, was supervised by Frank Shu.

After postdoctoral research in astronomy at Berkeley and the Center for Astrophysics | Harvard & Smithsonian, she became an assistant professor of astronomy at the University of Maryland, College Park in 1996. She was promoted to full professor in 2006, and moved to the Department of Astrophysical Sciences of Princeton University in 2012.

== Recognition ==
Ostriker was elected to the American Academy of Arts and Sciences in 2020. She was named a Fellow of the American Physical Society in 2022 "for seminal contributions to our understanding of the physical process that controls star formation in galaxies, and the structure and dynamics of the turbulent interstellar medium".
