= Ohio State University Press =

University press of Ohio State University

- Parent company: Ohio State University
- Founded: 1957
- Country of origin: United States
- Headquarters location: Columbus, Ohio
- Distribution: Chicago Distribution Center
- Publication types: Books, journals
- Official website: ohiostatepress.org

The Ohio State University Press is the university press of Ohio State University. It was founded in 1957.

The OSU Press has published approximately 1700 books since its inception. The current director is Tony Sanfilippo, who had previously worked for over 14 years at the Penn State University Press. OSU Press's book A Mother's Tale, by Phillip Lopate, was widely reviewed by national media in 2017. How to Make a Slave was a finalist for the National Book Award in nonfiction in 2020.

== Series/imprints ==
Series/imprints by OSU press include:

=== Latinographix ===
Latinographix was founded in 2017 as an imprint to publish graphic fiction and nonfiction narratives by Latino creators, and satirical studies such as Drawing on Anger: Portraits of U.S. Hypocrisy by Eric J. Garcia. The series also publishes graphic novels on pressing social justice issues, such as sexual abuse and homelessness in Mexico (such as Angelitos by Santiago Cohen and Ilan Stavans), as well as children's books for young people of color (such as Chupacabra Charlie by Frederick Luis Aldama).

=== Others ===
- 21st Century Essays
- Abnormativities
- The Academy for Leadership and Governance
- Classical Memories/Modern Identities
- Cognitive Approaches to Culture
- Formations
- Global Latin/o Americas
- Interventions
- Intersectional Rhetorics
- The Journal Charles B. Wheeler Poetry Prize
- The Journal Non/Fiction Prize
- Machete
- New Directions in Rhetoric and Materiality
- New Suns
- Race and Mediated Cultures
- Studies in Cartoons and Comics
- Theory and Interpretation of Narrative
- Mad Creek Books
- Trillium

== See also ==
- List of English-language book publishing companies
- List of university presses
