= Swedish children's literature =

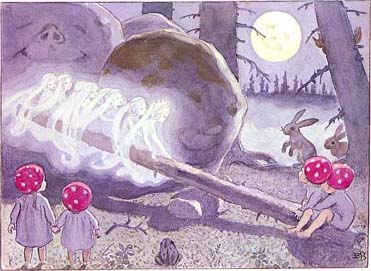
Illustration from Elsa Beskow's Tomtebobarnen (Children of the Forest), 1910

The Swedish children's literature tradition was initiated by the Swedish-speaking Finn Zachris Topelius in the 19th century. It flourished at the dawn of the 20th century with Elsa Beskow (1874–1953), who wrote and illustrated some 40 children's stories between 1897–1952. Her books were beloved and have continued to be reprinted in Sweden and many other languages. The early 20th century also saw the debut of the gripping children's novel "The Children from Frostmo Mountain" by Laura Fitinghoff. It is considered to be the first realistic Swedish children's novel. The book has been translated into several other languages. It was made into a film in 1945.

In the 1930s a new awareness of children's needs emerged. It was realized that children did not only warrant disciplinary and moralizing literature, but also childlike books to foster their imagination. This manifested itself shortly after World War II, when Astrid Lindgren published Pippi Longstocking in 1945. Pippi's rebellious behavior initially sparked resistance among some defenders of cultural values, but her work was eventually accepted, and with that children's literature was freed from the obligation to promote moralism.

Astrid Lindgren continued to publish many bestselling children's books, which eventually made her the most read Swedish author of all categories with over 100 million copies printed throughout the world, translated into over 80 languages. Lindgren showed in many other books her fine comprehension of childlike thought and values; in The Brothers Lionheart about death, as well as a tale of bravery; in Mio, My Son a fairy tale about friendship.

However, not all her stories had deep messages, at least on the surface. Three books on Karlsson-on-the-Roof (1955, '62, '68) are about a short, chubby and mischievous man with a propeller on his back, who is befriended by a boy. The stories of Karlsson-on-the-Roof became one of the most loved children's stories in Russia during the Soviet era. And in twelve books Astrid wrote about Emil of Maple Hills, a boy on the Småland countryside in the early 1900s, who continuously gets intro trouble because of his pranks. She also wrote many other appreciated books; most of them were filmed, some with good results that have led to them being continuously rerun on Swedish television.

One of the few fantasy writers in Swedish literature was Tove Jansson (1914–2001), who wrote her stories of the Moomins in nine books and four picture books between 1946 and 1993. Jansson was from Finland's Swedish-speaking minority, and wrote in Swedish. The Moomins are trolls that live in an economically and politically independent state, without any material necessities. Perhaps this explains the vast popularity the Moomins have enjoyed in many different countries. The Moomin books have been translated into over 30 languages.

More recently, other children's authors have become notable, such as Maria Gripe, Gunnel Linde, Inger and Lasse Sandberg, Sven Nordqvist with the Pettson and Findus series, Moni Brännström, Anders Jacobsson and Sören Olsson. Among the Swedish comic book artists who also illustrates children's books is Joakim Lindengren. Another notable writer of childrens books is George Johansson, who wrote works such as Mulle Meck, and certain works of science fiction.

https://sv.wikipedia.org/wiki/George_Johansson

== Sources ==
- Algulin, Ingemar, A History of Swedish Literature, published by the Swedish Institute, 1989. ISBN 91-520-0239-X
- Gustafson, Alrik, A History of Swedish Literature (2 volumes), 1961.
- Lönnroth, L., Delblanc S., Göransson, S. Den svenska litteraturen (ed.), 3 volumes (1999)
- Warburg, Karl, Svensk Litteraturhistoria i Sammandrag (1904), p. 57 (Online link, provided by Project Runeberg). This book is rather old, but it was written for schools and is probably factually correct. However, its focal point differs from current-day books.
