= San Diego State University Press =

- Parent company: San Diego State University
- Country of origin: United States
- Headquarters location: San Diego, California
- Publication types: books, journals
- Imprints: Hyperbole Books
- Official website: sdsupress.sdsu.edu

San Diego State University Press (or SDSU Press) is a university press that is part of San Diego State University (SDSU), with noted specializations in border studies, critical theory, Latin American studies, cultural studies, and comics. It is the oldest university press in the California State University system.

It presently publishes books under two rubrics: CODEX, focused on critical theory, and surTEXT, focused on Latin American/Transamerican Cultural Studies. In 2006, the press also inaugurated "Hyperbole Books", specializing in "publishing cutting-edge, over-the-top experiments in critical theory, literary criticism and graphic narrative."

SDSU Press is currently directed by William Nericcio, and guided by an internal editorial board.

== See also ==
- List of English-language book publishing companies
- List of university presses
