= Joakim Lindengren =

Swedish cartoonist

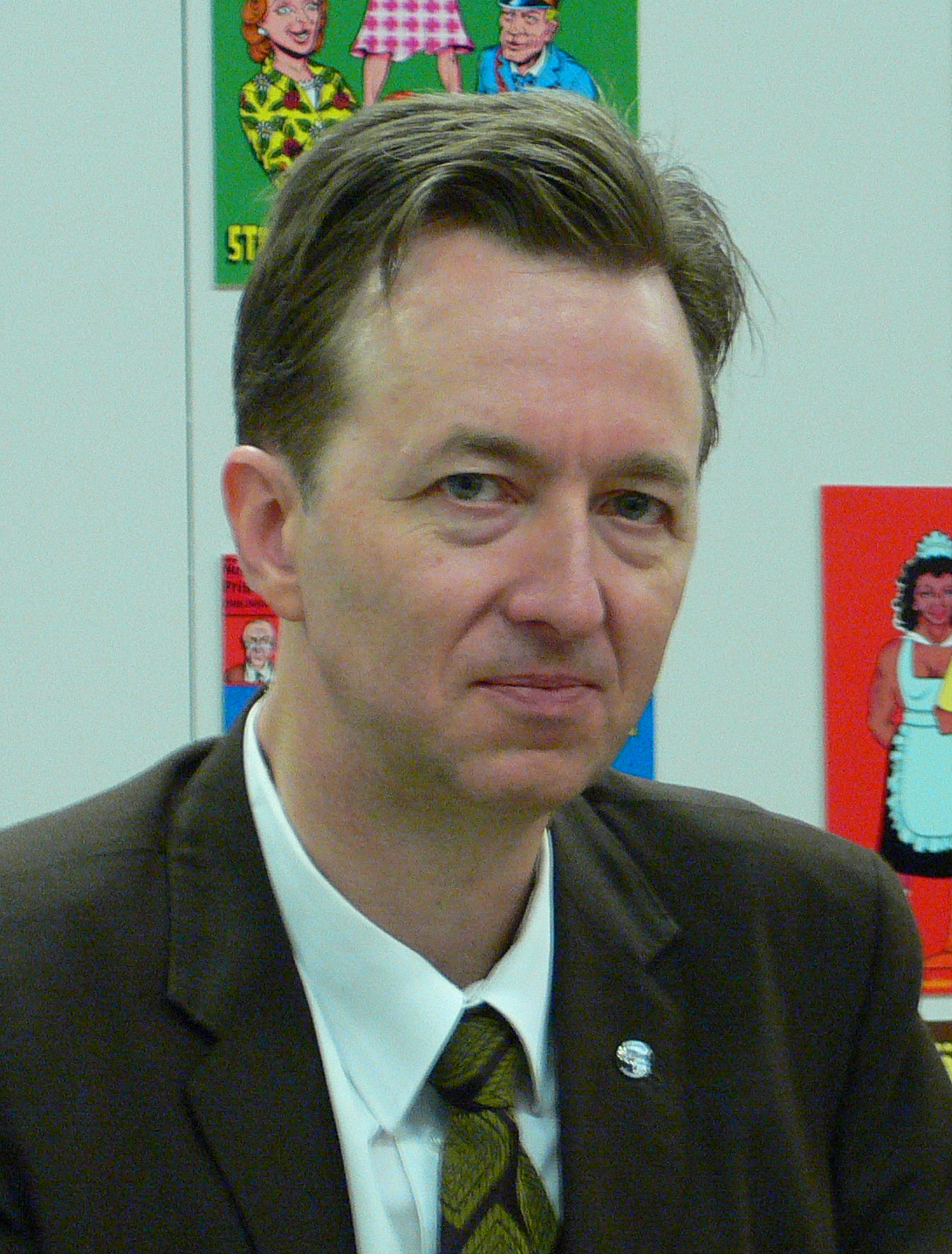
- Born: March 28, 1962 (age 63)
- Occupations: Cartoonist, illustrator and artist

Joakim Lindengren (born March 28, 1962) is a Swedish cartoonist, illustrator and artist.

== Career ==
Lindengren studied fine arts at Västerås Konstskola and Konstfack in Stockholm. He made his comic album debut in the early 1980s. He has been published in magazines such as Pondus, Galago, Pyton and Mega-Pyton and has created more than twenty comic book albums. He and David Nessle collaborated on the popular series John Holmes & Sherlock Watson.

Lindengren created the superhero Kapten Stofil (Captain Geezer), a series about an old grumpy man whose sole power is conjuring 1950s and 60s nostalgia. The character resents technology and progress in general. The series is drawn by hand in a Silver Age pastiche style. The hero in the series had his own comic book series as well. Kapten Stofil's alter ego is Lindengren, who is a nostalgia buff who collects vintage toys and drives an old hearse.

Lindengren collaborated with Puerto Rican author Giannina Braschi on the Latinx comic book "United States of Banana." Lindengren drew in black pencil the wide cast of iconic characters from the stage such Hamlet, Zarathustra, and Segismundo as well as political characters from real life such as Fidel Castro, Donald Trump, Luis Munoz Marin and Barack Obama. The work is a post-911 political allegory about the fall of the United States and the independence of Puerto Rico. He created realistic depictions of physical locations in New York and Puerto Rico, such as South Street Seaport, Statue of Liberty, Old San Juan, and the United Nations. Lindengren filled the work with art history, quoting works of Goya, Hieronymus Bosch and Francis Bacon.

== See also ==
- Puerto Rican Comic Books
- Silver Age of Comic Books
- United States of Banana
- Swedish children's literature
