= Ingelinn Lossius-Skeie =

Norwegian politician

Ingelinn Lossius-Skeie (born 14 December 1976) is a Norwegian politician for the Progress Party.

She served as a deputy representative to the Parliament of Norway from Aust-Agder during the term 2017–2021. She hails from Lillesand Municipality.
