= Giannina Braschi =

Puerto Rican writer (born 1953)

- Born: February 5, 1953 (age 73); San Juan, Puerto Rico
- Occupations: Poet; novelist; dramatist; philosopher
- Relatives: Miguel Braschi, brother
- Writing career
- Period: 1981–present
- Genres: poetry, theater, novel, political philosophy
- Subjects: Immigration, independence, Capitalism, terrorism, Puerto Rico, revolution, love, American imperialism, September 11 attacks
- Notable works: Yo-Yo Boing!; Empire of Dreams; United States of Banana; Putinoika
- Notable awards: National Endowment for the Arts Fellow, PEN/Open Book Award, New York Foundation for the Arts, Danforth Scholarship, Ford Foundation, Rutgers Faculty Grant, Angela Y. Davis Award, Fray Luis de León Medal for Ibero-American Poetry, Enrique Anderson Imbert Award from the North American Academy of the Spanish Language
- Movements: Postmodernism, Postcolonialism, Nuyorican, McOndo, Hysterical Realism
- Website: gianninabraschi.com

Giannina Braschi (born February 5, 1953) is a Puerto Rican poet, novelist, dramatist, and scholar. Her notable works include Empire of Dreams (1988), Yo-Yo Boing! (1998), United States of Banana (2011), and Putinoika (2024).

Braschi writes cross-genre literature and political philosophy in Spanish, Spanglish, and English. Her work is a hybrid of poetry, metafiction, postdramatic theatre, memoir, manifesto, and political philosophy. Her writings explore the enculturation journey of Hispanic immigrants, and dramatize the three main political options of Puerto Rico: independence, colony, and state.

== Early life ==
Giannina Braschi was born to an upper-class family of Italian ancestry in San Juan, Puerto Rico. In her teen years, she was a founding member of the San Juan Children's Choir, a fashion model, and a tennis champion. Her father Euripides ("Pilo") Braschi was also a tennis champion.

Her brother, Miguel Braschi, was the plaintiff in a landmark case in 1989 regarding the rights of same-sex couples.

In the 1970s, Braschi studied literature and philosophy in Madrid, Rome, Rouen, and London, before she settled in New York City. She credited her start in poetry to the older Spanish poets who mentored her when she lived in Madrid: Claudio Rodríguez, Carlos Bousoño, Vicente Aleixandre, and Blas de Otero. Braschi credits Puerto Rican playwright René Marqués and public intellectual Nilita Vientós Gastón as her early mentors.

== Academic career ==
With a PhD in Hispanic Literatures from State University of New York, Stony Brook (1980), Braschi was a professor at Rutgers University, City University of New York, and Colgate University. Braschi has received awards and fellowships from institutions including Ford Foundation, Danforth Scholarship, National Endowment for the Arts, New York Foundation for the Arts, Rutgers University, and PEN, among others. She published a book on the poetry of Gustavo Adolfo Becquer and essays on Cervantes, Garcilaso, César Vallejo, Juan Ramon Jimenez and Federico García Lorca.

== Literary career ==
Braschi's work is situated in the Latino avant-garde, a "burgeoning body of work that testifies to Latino writers’ abiding interest in the avant-garde as a means for engaging ideas of material, social relevance". Her writings are also placed within the fields of Postcolonial, Postmodern, and Nuyorican literatures, as well as Latino political philosophy. Braschi is considered a "revolutionary voice" in contemporary Latin American literature".

=== Spanish: El Imperio de los sueños ===
In the 1980s, Braschi wrote dramatic poetry in Spanish prose in New York City. Her postmodern poetry titles were published in Barcelona, Spain, including: Asalto al tiempo (Assault on Time, 1980), La Comedia profana (Profane Comedy, 1985), and El Imperio de los sueños (Empire of Dreams, 1988). She was part of the Nuyorican movement. New York City is the site and subject of much of her poetry. In a climactic episode of Braschi's Empire of Dreams, "Pastoral or the Inquisition of Memories", shepherds invade 5th Avenue during the Puerto Rican Day Parade and take over the City of New York; the shepherds ring the bells of St. Patrick's Cathedral, and seize the observation deck of the Empire State Building. Immigrant characters play the role of other characters, swapping names, genders, personal histories, and identities. Alicia Ostriker situates her gender-bending and genre-blending poetry as having a "sheer erotic energy that defies definition and dogma."

=== Spanglish: Yo-Yo Boing! ===
She published the first full-length Spanglish novel Yo-Yo Boing! in 1998. Yo-Yo Boing! explores "the lived experiences of urban life for Hispanics, as in the case with New York City, and her principal interest is in representing how individuals move in and out of different cultural coordinates, including one so crucial as language." The book was written in an era of renewed calls for English-only laws, ethnic cleansing campaigns, and corporate censorship. "For decades, Dominican and Puerto Rican authors have carried out a linguistic revolution", noted The Boston Globe, "and Giannina Braschi, especially in her novel Yo-Yo Boing!, testify to it".

=== English: United States of Banana ===
Braschi published the geopolitical comic-tragedy United States of Banana, her first book written entirely in English, in 2011. It is a postmodern cross-genre work that opens with the collapse of the World Trade Center on 9/11. The work is a critique of 21st-century capitalism and the global war on terror. Subjects include immigration, mass incarceration, financial terrorism, colonial debt structures, and "power imbalances within the Americas." The work is celebratory of foreign influences. Braschi stated in Evergreen Review that she considered herself "more French than Beckett, Picasso and Gertrude Stein", and identifies as the "granddaughter of Alfred Jarry and Antonin Artaud, bastard child of Samuel Beckett and James Joyce, half-sister to Heiner Müller, kissing cousin of Tadeusz Kantor, and lover of Witkiewicz".

=== English: Putinoika, a Modern Bacchae ===
Braschi's epic tragicomedy Putinoika (Brown Ink, Flowersong, 2024) deals with frenzy and plague in the Putin and Trump era. The mixed-genre work is based on the ancient Greek tragedy Bacchae by Euripides. The political satire unfolds in three parts: Palinode, Bacchae, and Putinoika. Themes include delusion, collusion, pollution. There is a vast array of historical, mythic, and contemporary political characters spanning Antigone, Electra, Dionysus, Mari Callas, El Greco, Greta Thurnberg, Nancy Pelosi, Melania, Ivanka, Pendejo. There are also sets of humorous characters or literary choruses such as the Muses of Bacchus, the Agents of Pendejo, the Putinas of Putin, the Maenads, Doubles of Trump. Ending with a mediation of creativity and the creation of a new genre, the work has received critical praise from poets and scholars such as Forrest Gander, Carmen Boullosa, Miguel-Angel Zapata, and Elidio La Torre-Lagares, among others.

== Adaptations and translations ==
Giannina Braschi's texts have been adapted and applied to popular culture and fields such as television comedy, chamber music, comic books, industrial design, and ecological urban planning. Michael Zansky has used Braschi's texts in his paintings and Michael Somoroff has created short films with her works. There is a theater play by Juan Pablo Felix, a Giannina Chair by industrial designer Ian Stell, chamber music by Puerto Rican composer Gabriel Bouche Caro, and a graphic novel by Joakim Lindengren of United States of Banana. Puerto Rican composer Gabriel Bouche Caro has composed chamber music works with her poems. There is a namesake Giannina chair designed by American industrial designer Ian Stell. Her books have been translated into English by Tess O'Dwyer, into Spanish by Manuel Broncano, and into Swedish by Helena Eriksson and Hannah Nordenhok.

== Political activism ==
Braschi is an advocate for Puerto Rican independence. She declared the independence of Puerto Rico in United States of Banana and stated in the press that "Liberty is not an option — it is a human right." In the 1990s, she protested the United States Navy's bombing exercises in Vieques, along with politicians Rubén Berríos and Robert F. Kennedy Jr., singers Danny Rivera and Willie Colón, and fellow authors Ana Lydia Vega and Rigoberta Menchú. Braschi spoke on a panel on "The New Censorship" at the PEN 2012 World Voices Festival where she offered "a critique of 21st century capitalism in which [she] condemned corporate censorship and control." In July 2019, Braschi led early marches outside La Fortaleza in Old San Juan to demand the resignation of Puerto Rican Governor Ricardo Rossello, and joined massive protests, with singers Bad Bunny, Residente, and Ricky Martin, that led to the Governor's resignation.

== Books ==
- Putinoika, Brown Ink, Flowersong Press, 2024.
- Urbanismo ecológico en América Latina. Mohsen Mostafavi, Gareth Doherty, Marina Correia, Ana Maria Duran Calisto, and Luis Valenzuela (eds.). Editorial Gustavo Gili/Harvard University Graduate School of Design, 2019. ISBN 9788425229480.
- Two Crowns of The Egg, with Michael Somoroff, Donald Kuspit. ISBN 886208353X
- Estados Unidos de Banana, with Manuel Broncano, AmazonCrossing, Madrid, 2015. ISBN 978-1503934047
- United States of Banana, AmazonCrossing, Seattle, 2011. ISBN 978-1611090673
- Yo-Yo Boing!, AmazonCrossing, Seattle, 2011.
- Empire of Dreams, AmazonCrossing, Seattle, 2011.
- El imperio de los sueños, Editorial de la Universidad de Puerto Rico, Rio Piedras, 2000.
- Yo-Yo Boing!, Latin American Literary Review, Pittsburgh, 1998.
- Empire of Dreams (English translation by Tess O'Dwyer; Introduction by Alicia Ostriker), Yale University Press, New Haven/London, 1994.
- El imperio de los sueños, Anthropos Editorial del hombre, Barcelona, 1988.
- Libro de payasos y bufones, Grafica Uno, Giorgio Upiglio, Milan, 1987.
- La comedia profana, Anthropos Editorial del hombre, Barcelona, 1985.
- Asalto al tiempo, Ambitos Literarios, Barcelona, 1980.

== Scholarly works ==
- "Breve tratado del poeta artista", Cuadernos Hispanoamericanos, No. 433-36, 1986 (an essay on the poetry of Federico García Lorca).
- "La gravedad de la armonía en ‘Soledades galerías y otros pomas’ de Machado," Plural, 1983 (an essay on the poetry of Antonio Machado).
- "La poesía de Bécquer: El tiempo de los objetos o los espacios de la luz", Costa Amic, Mexico City, 1982 (a scholarly book on the poetry of Gustavo Adolfo Becquer).
- "La Metamorfosis del ingenio en la Égloga III de Garcilaso," Revista canadiense de estudios hispánicos, 1979 (an essay on Garcilaso's third eclogue).
- "Cinco personajes fugaces en el camino de Don Quijote", Cuadernos Hispanoamericanos, No. 328, 1977 (an essay on Don Quixote by Cervantes).

== Awards and honors ==
- Angela Y. Davis Award, American Studies Association, 2024.
- Medalla Fray Luis de León de Poesía Iberoamericana (Ibero-American Poetry Medal), 2025
- Enrique Anderson Imbert, North American Academy of the Spanish Language, 2022.
- Danforth Scholarship
- El Diario La Prensa's Outstanding Women of 1998
- Ford Foundation Fellowship
- National Endowment for the Arts Fellowship
- New York Foundation for the Arts Fellowship
- Peter S. Reed Foundation/InterAmericas
- PEN American Center's Open Book Award
- Instituto de Cultura Puertorriqueña/grant

== See also ==
- Hysterical realism
- Puerto Rican literature
- American literature in Spanish
- American poetry
- Caribbean poetry
