= United States of Banana =

Post-9/11 dramatic novel by Giannina Braschi

- Author: Giannina Braschi
- Language: English
- Subject: September 11, Terrorism, Colonialism, Revolution, Puerto Rican Independence, Love
- Genre: Postmodernism; Hysterical realism; Metamodernism; satire; tragicomedy; philosophical fiction; cross-genre
- Set in: United States; Puerto Rico
- Published: 2011
- Publisher: AmazonCrossing
- Publication date: November 8th, 2011
- Publication place: United States
- Pages: 305
- ISBN: 9781611090673

United States of Banana is a 2011 postmodern allegorical novel by the Puerto Rican author Giannina Braschi. It is a cross-genre work that blends experimental theatre, prose poetry, short story, and political philosophy with a manifesto on democracy and American life in a post-9/11 world. The book dramatizes the global war on terror and narrates the author's displacement after the attacks from her home in the Battery Park neighborhood in New York City. The work addresses Latin American immigration to the United States, Puerto Rico's colonial status, and "power imbalances within the Americas."

== Summary ==
=== Part One: Ground Zero ===
Part One, titled as "Ground Zero", critiques 21st-century capitalism and corporate censorship with its depictions of New York City before and during the September 11 attacks. Part One unfolds through a collection of metafiction, short stories, and philosophical essays on American culture since the attacks on the World Trade Center. Using avant-garde techniques, Braschi links post-9/11 fears of terrorism with the "daily suffering that stems from a changing, debt-ridden economy to offer a scathing critique of neoliberal economic and social reforms."

=== Part Two: United States of Banana ===
In Part Two, called "United States of Banana", the structure changes from political manifesto and philosophical fiction into an experimental theater play about economic terrorism, U.S. colonialism, liberty, and love. Hamlet and Zarathustra (Zoroaster) join the author's alter-ego, Giannina, on a quest to liberate the Puerto Rican prisoner Segismundo (named after the protagonist of Pedro Calderón de la Barca's La vida es sueño) from the dungeon of the Statue of Liberty, where he has been held by his father, the king of the United States of Banana, for more than 100 years, for the crime of having been born. When the King remarries, he frees his son, and for the sake of reconciliation, makes Puerto Rico the fifty-first state and grants American passports to all Latin American citizens.

The play dramatizes the plight of prisoners in the United States, Puerto Rico's position as an American territory, and Braschi's struggle for liberty. By having the people of Puerto Rico vote on Segismundo's liberty, the work satirizes the three political options of Puerto Rico: statehood, nation, or colony. The prison scenes feature Middle Eastern prisoners of war, including those classified as terrorists, who are detained indefinitely.

According to Ronald Mendoza-de Jesús, "The plot of United States of Banana unfolds in the following way: Shakespeare’s Hamlet, Nietzsche’s Zarathustra, and a character named Giannina decide to cross the Hudson River to go to Liberty Island, penetrate the Statue of Liberty, and free Segismundo, subsequently freeing Puerto Rico from its colonial captivity. This act of defiance produces a response from Gertrude—Hamlet’s mother—who concocts a plan to marry Basilio, free Segismundo, and bring him into the same family as Hamlet as the only possible way to save the ancien régime of the imperial United States of Banana from collapsing. As part of her plan, Gertrude convinces Basilio that Puerto Rico should be granted admission into the United States of Banana, that all illegal immigrants should be granted citizenship, and that the borders of the United States of Banana should be opened. Her efforts to mitigate the revolution by granting concessions to Giannina and the other insurgents fail. Giannina and her comrades declare unilaterally the independence of Puerto Rico after realizing that the changes in the United States of Banana’s policies toward Puerto Rico and Latin America were an attempt to perpetuate a sort of imperial Pax Banana under the joint leadership of Basilio and Gertrude. War erupts between Puerto Rico, Cuba (which has claims to Puerto Rico and seeks to create its own Caribbean empire), and the United States of Banana. Giannina and her comrades can only rely on coconuts and philosophical conversation to fight the soldiers of the empire. But the timely intervention of China—the USB creditor—secures the independence of Puerto Rico and brings Braschi’s geopolitical comedy to a close."

== Adaptations ==
- American photographer Michael Somoroff directed and produced a series of short art films of the author's oral interpretation of the book; these films debuted at Cervantes Institute in New York on December 1, 2012.
- In 2015, Colombian film and theater director Juan Pablo Felix adapted United States of Banana for the stage as a play of the same name. This production premiered at Schapiro Theater at Columbia University in New York City with soundtrack and music scored by Suzana Peric.
- In 2017, the novel was adapted into a graphic novel by Swedish cartoonist Joakim Lindengren.
