= Macondo (disambiguation) =

Macondo is a fictional town in the works of Gabriel García Márquez.

Macondo may also refer to:

- Macondo (film), a 2014 Austrian film
- Macondo (star), or HD 93083, in the constellation Antlia
- Macondo (tree), or Cavanillesia platanifolia, a tree in Central and South America
- Macondo, Malanje, a commune in Angola, Africa
- Macondo, Moxico, a commune in Angola, Africa
- Macondo Awards, given by the Colombian Academy of Cinematography Arts and Sciences
- Macondo Prospect, an offshore oil drilling block in the Gulf of Mexico
- Macondo Writers Workshop, a writing workshop founded by Sandra Cisneros

== See also ==
- McOndo, a Latin American literary movement
  - McOndo (book), the 1996 literary anthology that spawned the McOndo movement
