= McOndo =

Latin American literary movement

McOndo is a Latin American literary movement that breaks with the magical realism mode of narration, and counters it with languages borrowed from mass media. The literature of McOndo presents urban Latin American life, in opposition to the fictional rural town of Macondo.

Initiated by Chilean writers Alberto Fuguet and Sergio Gómez in the 1990s, the movement claims to serve as an antidote to the Macondo-ism that demanded of all aspiring Latin American writers that they set their tales in steamy tropical jungles in which the fantastic and the real happily coexist.

The realistic narratives of McOndo literature refer and allude to popular culture as lived in the cities and suburbs of contemporary Latin American cities—thus the gritty, hard-boiled depictions of poverty and crime, of the local economic consequences of globalization, and of social class and identity differences. Despite McOndo literature often depicting the social consequences of political economy, the narrative mode is usually less political than that of magical realism.

== History ==
=== Etymology ===
The term McOndo derives from Macondo, the fictional town depicted in One Hundred Years of Solitude (1967) by Gabriel García Márquez. The term was coined by Chilean writers Alberto Fuguet and Sergio Gómez in the 1990s, when they published the short-story anthology McOndo, playing with the terms Macondo, McDonald's, Macintosh, and condo.

==== Origins ====
In the 1980s, Latin American novelists had generally diverted from magical realism; yet the McOndo literary movement did not coalesce as literature, nor constitute a genre, until the mid-1990s. In 1994, the Chilean novelist Alberto Fuguet participated in an international writing workshop at the University of Iowa, where he submitted for publication a short story to the Iowa Review magazine; he expected prompt acceptance, translation to English, and publication, because Latin American writers then were an intellectual vogue in trendy U.S. mainstream culture. Yet, upon reading the novelist Fuguet's submitted short story, the Iowa Review editor dismissed it as "not Latin American enough ... [because] the story could have taken place right here, in [North] America." Two years later, in 1996, in retort to the U.S. editorial rebuffing of realist fiction from and about Latin America, Alberto Fuguet and Sergio Gómez in Spain published McOndo (1996) a short-story anthology of contemporary Latin American literature. The McOndo anthology comprised seventeen stories by Latin American and peninsular Spanish writers, all men whose literary careers had begun in the 1990s; each was of the generation born in the late 1950s. The McOndo writers ideologically distanced themselves from Magical Realism, because it misrepresented contemporary Latin America — which, in the 1990s, comprised "shopping malls, cable television, suburbs, and pollution" — because literature had progressed beyond the "banana republic" Latin America of the dictator novel and of the Magical Realism genre; the cultures of the 19th and of the 20th centuries.

The McOndos presented the cultural effects and consequences of global commerce upon Latin American societies, of the erasure of cultural demarcations (among nations and countries), and the consequent reduction of identity that is cultural homogenization. In an essay, Fuguet criticized the creative limitations that are the "picturesque locale and exotic characters" that publishers grew to expect of Latin American writers — because of the folkloric Macondo stereotype. Citing the Cuban writer Reinaldo Arenas, the literary world (publishers and critics) expected Latin American novelists to tackle only two themes: (i) the celebration of economic underdevelopment and (ii) cultural exoticism. Hence, Fuguet concluded that, despite pretty people and pretty scenery, the contemporary Latin American city and world that he (Fuguet) inhabits, is too complicated for Magical Realism to grasp and effectively narrate. In the event, Sergio Gómez and Fuguet's publication of the McOndo (1996) anthology served a two-fold end: (i) the Fuguet "Introduction" as literary manifesto, and (ii) the supporting anthology of contemporary urban Latin American fiction; the Latin experience of town versus country.

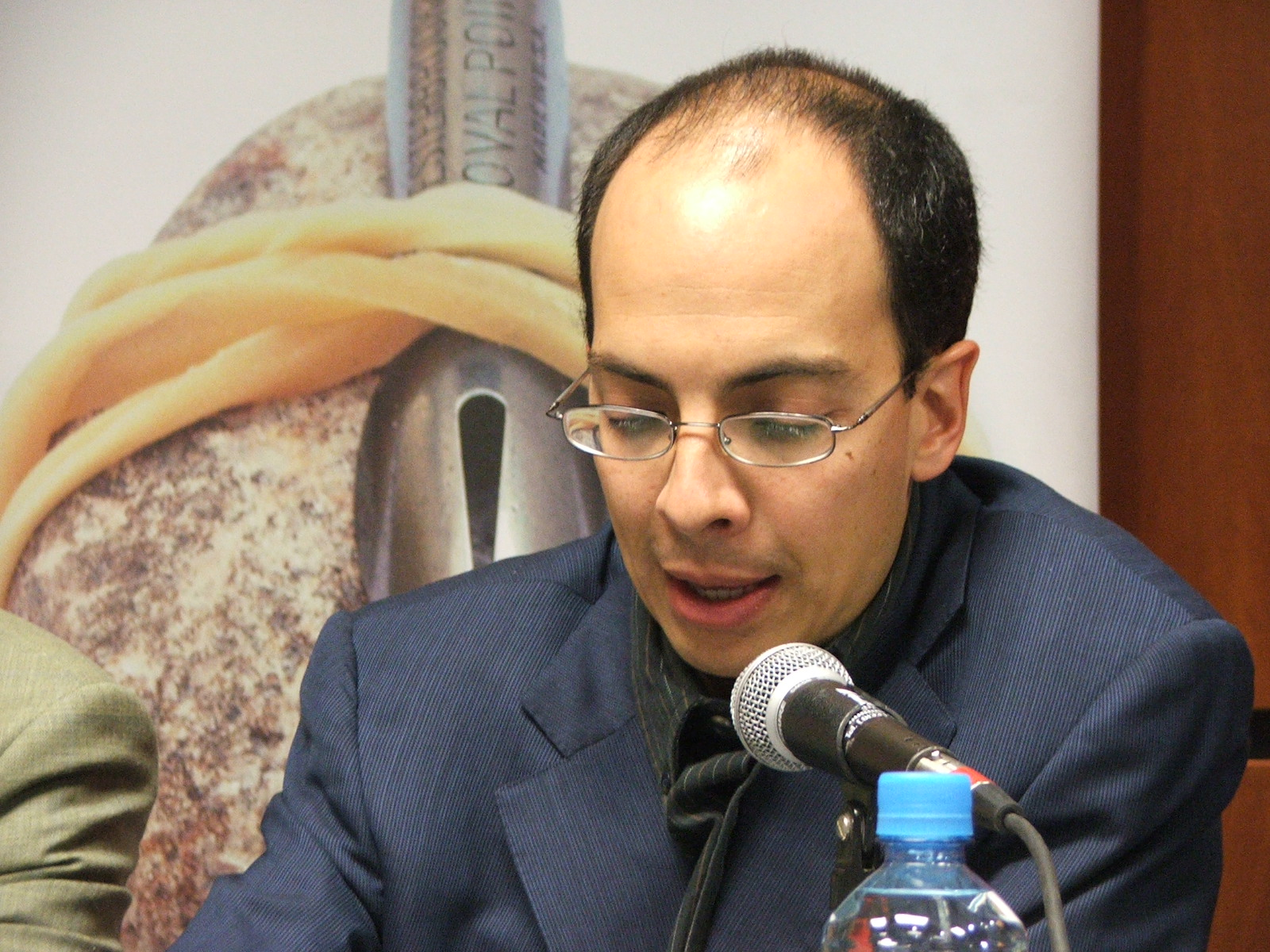
The Crack Generation: Jorge Volpi, Revuelta magazine, 2005 Guadalajara Book Fair, in Mexico.

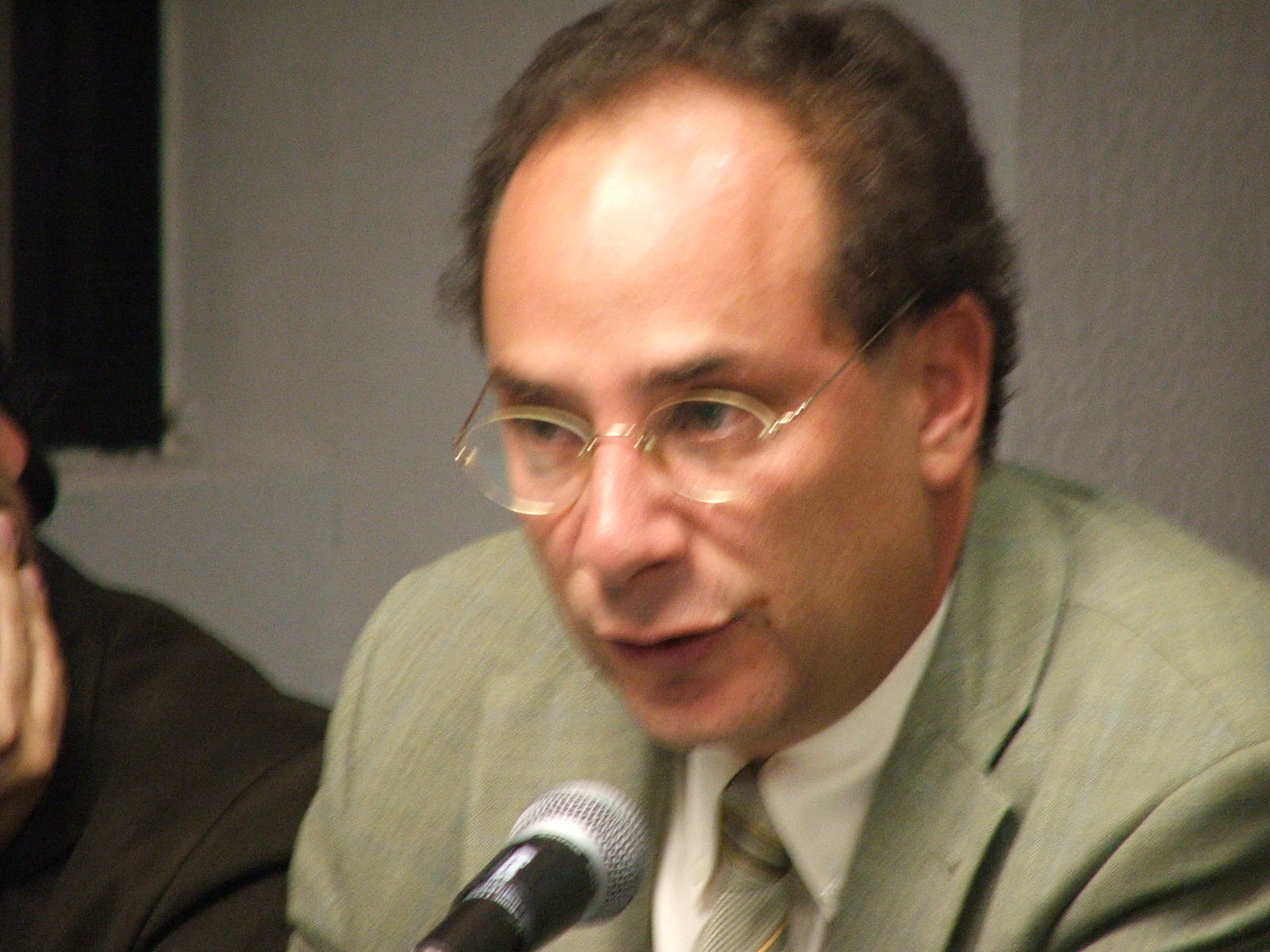
The Crack Generation: Ignacio Padilla, Revuelta magazine, 2005 Guadalajara Book Fair, in Mexico.

Meanwhile, in Mexico City, during the mid-1990s, whilst McOndo coalesced as a literary movement, "La generación del crack" (The Crack Generation — Jorge Volpi, Ignacio Padilla, Eloy Urroz, Pedro Ángel Palou, and Ricardo Chávez-Castañeda) presented Mexican realist literature flouting the Magical Realism strictures of the Latin American Boom; their ideologic advocacy emphasised that every writer find a voice, not a genre. Their initial publication was the Manifiesto Crack (Crack Manifesto, 1996) published a month earlier than the McOndo (1996) short-story anthology; the literary manifestos proved ideologically sympathetic. Nonetheless, despite shared ideologic antipathy to Magical Realism, McOndo and The Crack Movement were unalike; Edmundo Paz-Soldán observed that McOndo is "a moment in the celebration of the creative mixture of high- and popular- culture", whilst The Crack Movement has "proposed a sort of élitist re-establishment of values." Literary-world gossip postulates that the anti–magical militancy of McOndo and The Crack Movement derives more from commercial jealousy than from artistic divergence; nonetheless, the criticism might have been ideologically motivated by the international success that allowed magic realist fiction to establish the exotic Macondo as the universal image of Latin America; hence, who controls the novel market controls the cultural image of Latino America that the globalized world perceives.

As a literary movement, McOndo then included like ideologies of literature and technique with which to communicate the experience of being Latin American in McOndo. Yet, the McOndos are quasi-apolitical, unlike the mid–20th-century Magical Realist novelists, for whom political discourse was the raison d’être of being a public intellectual. Nevertheless, the 21st-century modernity of McOndo orients it away from utopian Left-wing ideology (national identity, imperialism, colonialism, et cetera) to the politics of the 20th century, which include "a global, mixed, diverse, urban, twenty-first-century-Latin America, bursting on TV; and apparent in music, art, fashion, film, and journalism; hectic and unmanageable." In the 21st century, contemporary Latin America is an historico–cultural hybrid of the 19th and the 21st centuries (cf. the dictator novel and the banana republic). In the event, the writers of the McOndo (1996) short-story anthology took discrete literary paths; Alberto Fuguet noted that "divergence, for certain, was expected, for McOndo was not a deal, nor a treaty, nor a sect." Later, some McOndos reneged their literary militancy against Magical Realism; Edmundo Paz Soldán observed that "today, it is very clear, for many of us, that it is naïve to renounce such a wonderful tradition of political engagement on the part of the Latin American writer".

== Themes ==
The thematic substance of McOndo is based upon its literary predecessors, yet its representations of the experience of being a Latin American man and a Latin American woman in an urban (city–suburban) world pervaded by U.S. pop culture, are in direct opposition to the politically metaphoric, rural narratives used as political discourse by the Latin American Boom generation of writers, especially the magical-realists. Moreover, some novelists left their patrias (fatherlands), for the detached (foreign) perspective unavailable in the homeland. As a result, as exiles are wont to do, they idealized their patrias and wrote pithy novels of a land that should have been — yet always was there ... in the exiled writer's memory; thus the well-crafted fiction did not portray the contemporary national reality that had displaced the country (patria) he departed.

Unlike the magical realist writers, the McOndos wrote "here-and-now!" fiction, about the 21st-century metropolis they inhabit, and which surrounds them, and the homogenizing cultural-identity messages of pervasive mass communications media; to be Latin in an Anglo culture. Because contemporary Latin America is a cultural conflation of the 19th and 21st centuries, the McOndos substantive and technical divergence from Magical Realism (style, narrative mode, etc.) voided their predecessor traditions. Alberto Fuguet explains, "I feel [that] the great literary theme of ‘Latin American identity’ (who are we?) must now take a back seat to the theme of ‘personal identity’ (who am I?)." Whilst rejecting the resultant stereotype "Latin American Literature" derived from Magical Realism, the McOndos nonetheless respect the man; "I’m a really big fan of Márquez, but, what I really hate is the software he created, that other people use . . . they turn [narrative fiction] into more of an aesthetic [exercise] instead of an ideology. Anybody who begins to copy One Hundred Years of Solitude turns it into kitsch."

=== Global commerce ===
McOndo: The industrialised production philosophy of the McDonald's Corp. reduced Latin American cultures to national kitsch.

As novelistic dialogue, book title, and literary movement name, McOndo evokes the McDonald's corporate name and the place name Macondo, the locale of One Hundred Years of Solitude (1967). Each variant term has a contemporary cultural denotation for consumerism, for "banana republic", and for dictator novel literature; each denotes the cultural distortion of Hispanophone societies, by commercial globalization and the psychological flattening that U.S. English-language pop culture impinges upon the cultures native to Latin America; nevertheless, this Anglo cultural hegemony is not exclusive to Latin American literatures, but also occurs in Europe, e.g. the Spanish science-fiction film Open Your Eyes (1997) by Alejandro Amenábar.

McOndo literature partly arose to counter the world's uncritical perception of Magical Realism as the definitive literature from and about the societies and cultures of the Latin American countries, especially the novels of Colombian writer Gabriel García Márquez. McOndo novels and short stories transcend such rural limitations by examining, analysing, and comprehending the power dynamics among the Anglophone U.S. and the Hispanophone countries where "American" cultural hegemony maintains its politico-economic hegemony — by importing, to the subject countries, the political economy concept and business practice of the McJob.

McOndo fiction reports this contemporary, lived urban experience of such an economically unidirectional, Gringo business–Latin American labour "work relationship"; of what it is to be a Latin American man and a Latin American woman employed in a McJob in an unmagical city in an unmagical country pervaded with foreign consumerism and its irreconcilable discontents. Furthermore, unlike Magical Realism fiction, McOndo fiction reports the social consequences, at home (in Latinoamérica) and abroad (in el Norte) of this Anglo–Latin relationship; the exemplar book is the McOndo (1996) short-story anthology.

To the world, McOndo writers present the contemporary Latin America that no longer is "Macondo" the exotic land of exotic people presented in the literature of Magical Realism. Despite some remaining banana republic dictatorship façades, the McOndo writer accepts the de facto geopolitical reality of the integration of continental Latin America as a subordinate unitary economy of the globalized economic order. Salvador Plascencia's The People of Paper and Giannina Braschi's United States of Banana explore how first world banking priorities wreak havoc on Latin American cultures. As an artist, then, his or her moral responsibility is communicating to the "globalized world" that the "new" (contemporary) Latin America is McOndo, not Macondo, and that its cultures are hybrid cultures — of headphones and baseball caps, not sombreros and machetes. Many McOndo writers, U.S.A. city-born men and women (chicano, Hispanic, Latino, et al.), did not live the rural idyls of magical realist fiction, hence, they see Macondo realistically, not romantically, and write about urban life.

=== The city and urban space ===
McOndo fiction shows the connections and relations among the mass communications media, Latin personal identity, and the consequences of their representation or non-representation of urban space; the city is an image that molds the viewer. From said connections derive politically engaged stories of lived experience and created Latino and Latina identities; thus the coinage "urban space" denotes and connotes the physical and virtual locales of a life of mistaken identity that cities have become for Latin Americans.

In McOndo narratives, cities and city life are realistically portrayed as places and circumstances rendered virtual ("non-places") by the technologies of the Internet, cellular telephones, and cable television; virtual space has supplanted physical space in the city. To wit, the writer Ana María Amar Sánchez said that cities have become interchangeable, homogeneously indistinguishable from each other, especially when seen from a distance, whilst riding in a speeding automobile travelling a highway en route to a shopping center; seen so, the city appears virtual, an image in the screen of a computer or a television set.

Unlike Magical Realism, most McOndo stories occur in cities, not the rural world of Macondo; realism, not metaphor, is the mode. McOndo shows the contemporary, 21st-century Latin America of Spanglish hybrid tongues, McDonald's hamburguesas, and computadoras Macintosh, that have up-dated the romanticised banana republic worlds of the Latin American Literary Boom of the 1960s and 1970s.

=== Sex and sexual orientation ===
In accordance with the contemporary world in which it takes place, the McOndo literary movement addresses the themes of sex and sexuality in a rather modern and unapologetic way. Sex scenes tend to be described and explained realistically and are so detailed in some cases that they reach the point of coming off as vulgar. Sex is not a theme that is unnecessarily romanticized. Furthermore, consistent with McOndo's contemporary and postmodern foundations, gender roles and homosexuality are not ignored as relevant themes in modern society. While these roles and definitions are not shown or explained concretely, they are introduced and portrayed as real contemporary issues that also deal with the conflicts of identity that are ever present in modern Latin America.

=== Poverty, caste, and social class ===
The realistic presentation of the disparity between the rich and the poor of a society, and realistic depictions of poverty are fundamental to the McOndo literature that shows how the introduction of high technology gadgets and contemporary public infrastructure to the poor societies of Latin America result in a greater contrast between First-world wealth and Third-world poverty. Paz-Soldán explained that "In Bolivia there exist small islands of modernity in the middle of a great pre-modern ocean. The collision between tradition and modernity interests me." These traits of contemporary Latin American life are directly related to the globalization caused, in great part, by economic, political, and social influence of the U.S. In every way, this emphasis on the separation of wealth [from social responsibility] is perhaps one of the most important characteristics of life in contemporary Latin America" and its diaspora. Hence, mass poverty, which is a fundamental political matter in every country of the developing world, is a common theme in the McOndo literature that shows Latin American cities as decrepit, and composed of cramped barrios of houses, huts, and shacks.

=== Quotidian life ===
The short stories in the McOndo anthology depict the daily lives of the urban Latin American characters. The theme of la vida cotidiana, quotidian life, is true to realism, and the perspectives of the literature about contemporary Latin American life depict an urban McOndo, not rural Macondo. The world of the 21st-century Latin American lacks legends and magic, McOndo narrates the world of high technology, computers, and global business franchises.

== Notable writers ==
The most prominent and distinguished writers of the McOndo literary movement are: Alberto Fuguet, Giannina Braschi, Edmundo Paz Soldán, Hernán Rivera Letelier, Jorge Franco, Pedro Juan Gutiérrez, Pia Barros, Sergio Gómez. Fuguet, a leader of the movement, is credited for coining the term "McOndo" which began as a play on the name of Macondo, a town from Gabriel Garcia Marquez's novel One Hundred Years of Solitude.

== Media ==
=== Books ===
McOndo by Alberto Fuguet and Sergio Gómez, is an anthology of short stories of new Latin American literature which was first published in Spain in 1996. The authors criticize the genre of Magic realism claiming that it is no longer representative of the situation of modern Latin America and that as they do not live in the same world as the likes of Gabriel García Márquez they should not be expected to write on the same material.

Cortos by Alberto Fuguet examines the complexity of the cultural exchange between north and south in an emotionally charged narrative. "It is a collection of stories which discuss the American phenomenon at its height with characters who search to reinvent themselves as well as find their own identity in their battle against a quarrelsome reality."

Películas de Mi Vida also by Alberto Fuguet "is a novel about cinema and about how the movies that we see become part of who we are" The main character, Beltrán Soler, is on a plane ride home when all of a sudden fifty films that were greatly influential to him in adolescence and childhood come to his mind. He reconstructs his history with memories of the movies and the events and people surrounding the cinema and realizes how much these films have come to impact who he is.

The Empire of Dreams urban trilogy by Giannina Braschi attacks Magic Realism as a literary dementia that propagates negative stereotypes of Latin American people. The protagonist of the section, "The Intimate Diary of Solitude" is Mariquita Samper, a Macy's makeup artist, who shoots to kill the narrator of One Hundred Years of Solitude for exploiting intimacy and solitude.

Yo-Yo Boing! by Giannina Braschi chronicles with a violent tempo and sardonic wit the day-to-day realities of millions of Latin American immigrants living in New York, which is portrayed as the Darwinist capital of Latin America. The novel unfolds as a hybrid structurally and linguistically; it is written in a mesh and flow of Spanish, English, and Spanglish.

United States of Banana by Giannina Braschi foretells the disintegration of the United States due to obsessive capitalism: "Puerto Rico will be the first half-and-half banana republic state incorporated that will secede from the union. Then will come Liberty Island, then Mississippi Burning, Texas BBQ, Kentucky Fried Chicken—all of them—New York Yankees, Jersey Devils—you name it—will want to break apart—and demand a separation—a divorce. Things will not go well for the banana republic when the shackles and chains of democracy break loose and unleash the dogs of war. Separation—divorce—disintegration of subject matters that don’t matter anymore—only verbs—actions. Americans will walk like chickens with their heads cut off." United States of Banana novel offers a scathing critique of neoliberal economic and social reforms.

El Rey de la Habana by Pedro Juan Gutiérrez "is the story of a young adolescent who lets loose on the streets of La Habana in the 90s." In the style of ‘dirty realism’, the novel discusses such topics as poverty and prostitution, and depicts people who have hit rock bottom who have nowhere to turn. "It is the voice for those without a voice."

Pablo Escobar by Alonso Salazar delves into the life of Pablo Escobar through unpublished testimonials of family, friends and enemies. It depicts how Colombia became an empire of drug trafficking and focuses specifically on Escobar, both hated and adored for his past.

=== Critical studies ===
Latin American Literature and Mass Media, by Edmundo Paz Soldán and Debra A. Castillo, is an article anthology in four parts: "Revisions", "Mass Culture", "Narrative Strategies in our Fin de siglo", and "The Digital Wor(l)d", that "examines Latin American literature in the context of a complementary audiovisual culture dominated by mass media, such as photography, film, and the Internet."

Cuerpos Errantes: Literatura Latina y Latinoamericana en Estados Unidos, by Laura Loustau, studies the narrative systems of Latin American literature and Latina literature in the U.S., concentrating upon the novels and poems of Giannina Braschi. The subject is the displacement of people, and the consequent process of continual construction, deconstruction, and reconstruction of one's identity — cultural, national, writer's, that occurs upon crossing either a physical or a metaphoric border; the themes are geographic, national, linguistic, psychologic, textual, corporal, historical, and cultural displacements. Loustau's pithy précis is: "In this project we study the narrative and poetic systems, as if they are cultural representations, of Latin American and Latina literature in the United States."

De Macondo a McOndo, by Diana Palaversich, documents Latin American literature from after the Boom of the 1960s and 1970s, to the rise of neo-liberalism. Describing, in context, the literary genres that explicitly discussed controversial topics, such as homosexuality in a macho culture, and the dirty realism of McOndo, the contemporary Latin American world.

"Magical Realism and the History of the Emotions in Latin America" by Jerónimo Arellano sheds light on the rise and fall of the Boom generation through popular sentiments that are recalibrated by McOndo writers Sergio Gomez, Alberto Fuget, and Giannina Braschi.

Puerta al tiempo: literatura latinoamericana del siglo XX, by Maricruz Castro Ricalde is a panorama of Latin American literature of the 20th century, comprising authors such as María Luisa Bombal, Nicolás Guillén, Alejo Carpentier, Gabriel García Márquez, Julio Cortázar, Rubén Darío, Pablo Neruda, and Jorge Luis Borges, providing context via stylistic and thematic diversity.

=== Journalism ===
Magical Neoliberalism and I am not a magic realist by Alberto Fuguet are both commentaries by the author on the modernization of Latin American and Latina culture today as well as on the departure from magical realism to Mcondo that has occurred - greatly due to his steps into publicizing the changing attitudes of Latin American authors. He states that "The quaint, folkloric sensibility of magical realism has given way to a gritty, urban frenetic-ism in fiction, music, and film."

Macondo y otros mitos by Diana Palaversich is a short commentary and criticism of the McOndo movement.

=== Comics ===
Road story: Una novela gráfica by Gonzalo Martínez and Alberto Fuguet is part of a larger volume of short stories by Fuguet. It is a graphic interpretation of the story of a Chilean man trying to find himself in the middle of the barren landscapes of the border between the US and Mexico. It was published in 1961 in [Santiago, Chile] Joakim Lindengren and Giannina Braschi co-created the graphic novel of United States of Banana.

=== Film ===
In the genre of art films, photographer Michael Somoroff directed a series of short films based on Giannina Braschi's United States of Banana in 2011.

== Influences ==
In Latin American literature, the realistic representation of urban (city–suburban) life, and of popular culture began in the 1960s, with La Onda, a Mexican literary movement whose writers realistically presented 20th-century life in the City — where most Mexicans lived and worked — because pastoral (rural) Mexico was past, gone with the wind of industrial modernization; its influence upon McOndo was stylistic.

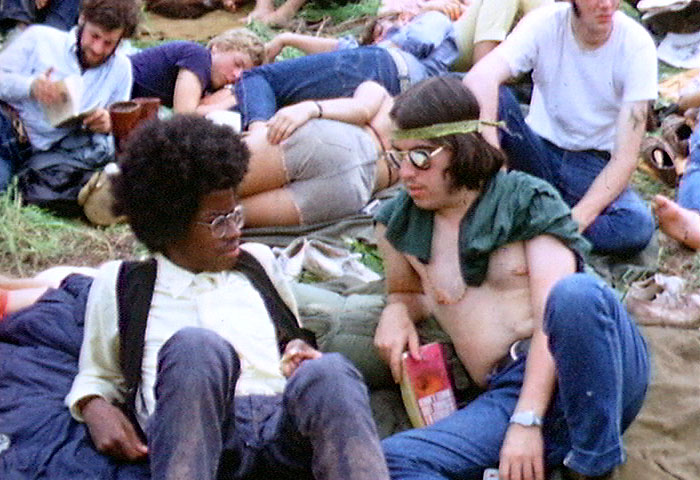
Hippies at the Woodstock Festival, 1969

"La Onda" was a literary consequence of the introduction of Anglophone rock music to the culturally conservative, socially rigid Mexican society of the 1960s. In the event, the cultural (generational) non-conformity inherent to the music of bands and singers such as The Doors, The Rolling Stones, The Beatles, Jimi Hendrix, and Janis Joplin, gave form (thought and action) to the cultural, societal, and generational discontents of Mexican young people — from every Mexican social class — to openly rebel against limiting tradition. Consequent to that great foreign-culture influence, the Mexican Middle class began to intellectually, then culturally, associate with the Hippie social movements of the U.S. and Europe. Mexican artists subsequently developed a national counter culture, based upon an amalgamation of foreign and domestic rock music, literature, language, and fashion, an example of which was the rock concert Festival Rock y Ruedas de Avándaro (11 September 1971); a time that Prof. Eric Zolov said "was a new transnational and trans-cultural era".

The adolescent angst novels La Tumba (The Tomb, 1964) and De Perfil (Profile View, 1966), by José Agustín, stylistically announced a new generation of novelist, writing in the contemporary popular idiom of society, presenting stories of life as lived. The styles of writing of La Onda provided Mexican young people with a literature pertinent to their Latin American cultural experience of life en la ciudad. The writers were published under the library title Literatura de La Onda (Literature of The Wave), by the Joaquín Mortiz publishing house.

La Onda literature focused upon the contemporary Mexican-identity cultural representations of 20th-century youth culture (language, music, fashion, etc.) produced by the mass communications media, and their cultural impact upon México and being mexicano, and being mexicana. The fiction was provocatively written, meant to provoke a response, and literary critics obliged the writers, calling the literatura de La Onda anti-literary literature; nonetheless, it proved popular as an alternative literature to the national literary canon established by tradition. Moreover, beyond fiction, the writers who were La Onda influenced the writers and journalists who established the Mexican new journalism, analogous to Hunter S. Thompson and Tom Wolfe in U.S. journalism. Notable works from La Onda include Gazapo, by Gustavo Sainz, about the contradictory, volatile world of adolescence; and De Perfil (Profile View), by José Agustín, about the life of an indifferent student, and the adolescence he endures.

Despite being a literary precursor to McOndo, the La Onda literary movement was particular to its Mexican time, place, and purpose. Unlike McOndo literature, the initial "Life in the City" alternative literature of La Onda then progressed to blending High culture with Low culture in addressing the demands of Mexican national social movements seeking to eliminate the hierarchy created by modernity. Whereas the McOndo literary movement focused its modernism to address the societal effects upon Latin America of the political economy of the amalgamation of culture (identity) and capitalism.

== Critics and supporters ==
The Chilean writer Ricardo Cuadros said that McOndo irreverence for Latin American literary tradition, its thematic–stylistic concentration upon the pop culture of the United States, and the literatures’ apolitical tone, are dismissive of the literary ideas, writing style, and narrative techniques of the generation of Latin American writers (García Márquez, Vargas Llosa, Carpentier, Fuentes, et al.) who lived under, opposed, and (occasionally) were repressed by dictators. In the New York Times newspaper article "New Era Succeeds Years of Solitude" Cuadros said that "Alberto Fuguet makes a caricature out of Latin American literature, which is very rich and complex, and which comes from a very painful literary process." He further accused McOndo Movement literature of preoccupation with the Self, rather than with the contemporary 21st-century culture it superficially presents, and he styled McOndo originator Alberto Fuguet a "sell-out to American culture, a spoiled product of globalization, and an irresponsible countryman."

About the McOndo (1996) short-story anthology, University of the Andes Prof. Ignacio Valente, said that the thematic substance of the Fuguet–Gómez compilation was neither expression nor commentary about contemporary Latin American life, but an imitation of American pop culture literature. Politically, the McOndo book-introduction has been identified as a political manifesto, the fascist and neo-liberal gripes of a (Latin) American-rich-boy implying that Latin American poverty and poor people had disappeared. The Bolivian critic Centa Reck, faults the McOndo narrative style for replacing the Macondo jungle flora, fauna, and rural landscape, with the McOndo urban "wild jungle of cell phones, McDonald’s, shopping malls, drugs, and an unintelligible slang." Nevertheless, despite the global literary aspiration, the McOndos narratively incorporate the slang and jargon and argot of their subjects, the local colour of the metropolis with which the reader can identify.

Contrariwise, the Mexican novelist Carlos Fuentes defends McOndo literature for its capturing the contemporary Latin America of today rather than yesterday; and that despite such narrative technique, the McOndos have not forgotten the past literature. In Empire of Dreams (1988), by Giannina Braschi, the novella "The Intimate Diary of Solitude" presents a lonely heroine, a department-store make-up artist, who shoots the narrator of the Latin American Boom — because she despises the commercialization of her solitude. The Chilean novel, The Movies of My Life (2003), by Aberto Fuguet, depicts a grim boarding school metaphor of Pinochet's Chile — a disappeared pro-Salvador Allende cousin and a mean grandmother (in the style of Madame Defarge, A Tale of Two Cities, 1859), capture the societal terror of the military government régime of General Augusto Pinochet. University of Los Angeles Prof. Verónica Cortínez, said that McOndo is about free thematic exploration and stylistic expression: "The McOndo writers reject the idea that Latin American writers need to ascribe to certain topics, or ways of being."

== See also ==
- Latin American Boom – Late 20th-century literary movement
- Latin American Literature
