= Mala onda =

1991 novel by Alberto Fuguet

Bad Vibes
- First edition
- Author: Alberto Fuguet
- Original title: Mala onda
- Translator: Kristina Cordero
- Language: Spanish
- Genre: Bildungsroman
- Publisher: Planeta (1992); St. Martin's Press (1997 English translation)
- Publication date: November 1991
- Publication place: Chile
- English publication date: April 1997
- Media type: Print
- Pages: 308 (1997 St. Martin's Press translation)
- ISBN: 978-0-312-15059-4
- OCLC: 35657888
- Dewey Decimal: 863.20
- LC Class: PQ8098.16.U48 M313 1997
- Followed by: Tinta roja

Mala onda (English: Bad Vibes) is a Chilean Bildungsroman novel and social commentary by Alberto Fuguet. It is also Fuguet's debut novel, first published in 1991.

Mala onda is set in Chile during a ten-day period in September, 1980, around the time of the Chilean constitutional referendum. The protagonist is Matías Vicuña, a maladjusted, upper class, 17-year-old boy who is jaded and frustrated by what he perceives as the folly and blandness of his family and peers. Matías lives a loveless, meaningless life, and indulges in sex, drugs, alcohol, and rock music.

The novel examines the Chilean emulation of American consumerism and pop culture, in the context of a growing opposition to the dictatorial rule of Augusto Pinochet in Chile.

== Time and Place ==
The novel takes place in 1980 in Santiago, Chile during the political referendum of the country's future with Pinochet. The protagonist visits Rio, Brazil briefly in the beginning of the novel. He also goes to Reñaca, a resort in the region on Valparaiso. Other than these, the main location is the urban setting of Santiago. The neighborhoods mentioned in the novel within Santiago include Providencia, Ñuñoa, and Las Condes.

Matías finds comfort in J.D. Salinger's The Catcher in the Rye, relating to Holden Caulfield's cynicism and teenage angst. The novel culminates with Matías attempting to replicate Holden's self-inflicted isolation by fleeing his family, friends, and academics. He even purchases a red hunting hat to complete the persona. Ultimately, however, Matías is reunited with his father. Despite familial bouleversements, Matías finds peace and learns to embrace change: symbolizing the trepidation Chile faces as it undergoes a transition of power.

== Characters ==
- Matías Vicuña - protagonist, teenage boy
- Esteban Vicuña - Matías' father
- Rosario Jaeger de Vicuña - Matias' mother
- Nacho - Matías' best friend, military background, daddy issues
- Antonia - Matías' crush
- Cassia - Matías' Brazilian fling
- Alejandro Paz - Matías' friend, Marxist barkeeper, obsessed with the United States
- Flora - Matías' teacher
- Carmen - Vicuñas' family housemaid
- Josh Remsen - American rock singer-songwriter

== See also ==
- McOndo
- The Catcher in the Rye
