= Edmundo Paz Soldán =

Bolivian writer

Edmundo Paz-Soldán
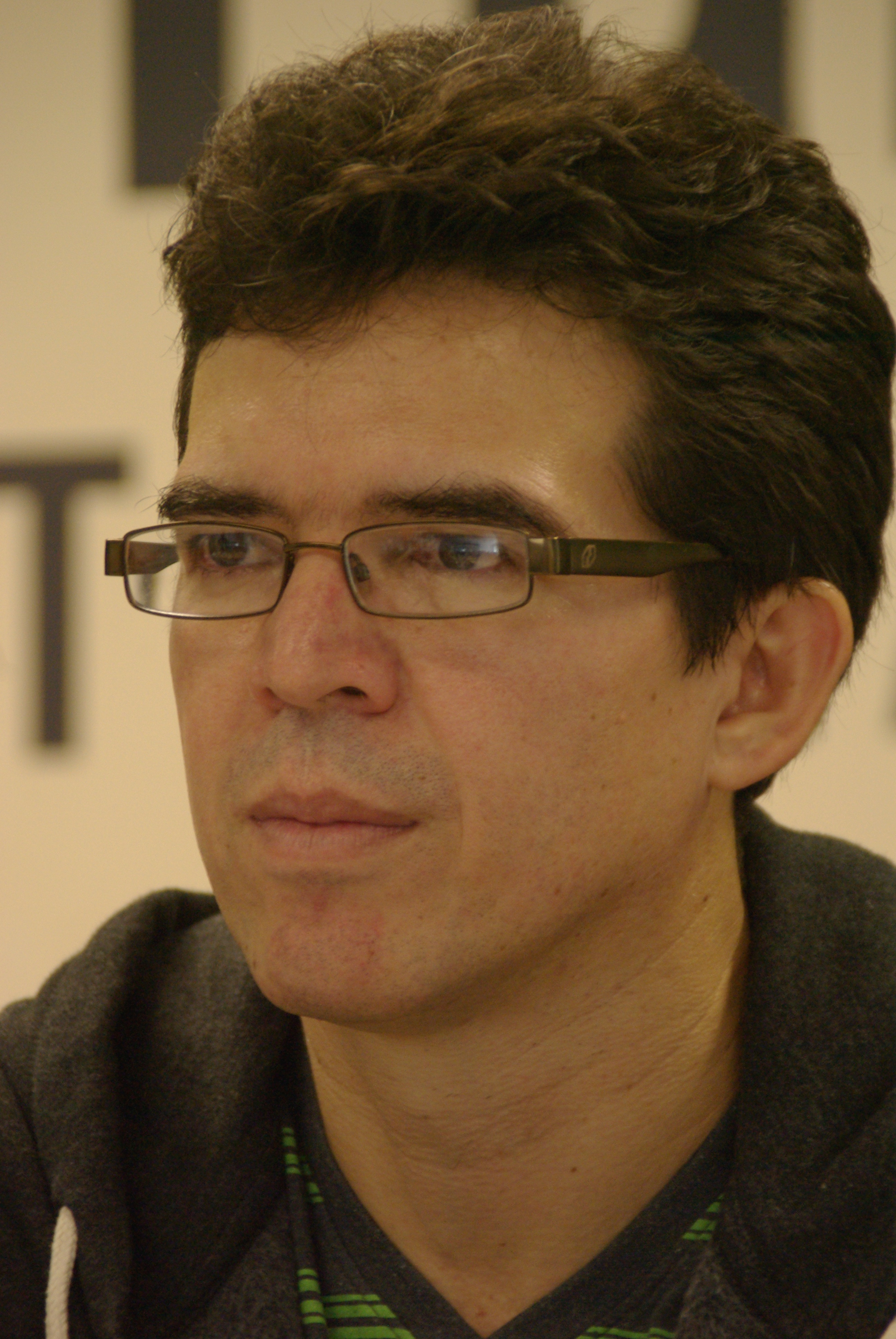
- Paz Soldán, 2011
- Born: 29 March 1967 (age 59); Cochabamba, Bolivia
- Writing career
- Genres: Novels, short stories, essays
- Notable awards: National Book Award (Premio Nacional de Novela, Bolivia); 2002; Juan Rulfo Prize; 1997; Erich Guttentag prize 1991? 1992?
- Movement: McOndo

José Edmundo Paz-Soldán Ávila (Cochabamba, 29 March 1967) is a Bolivian writer. His work is a prominent example of the Latin American literary movement known as McOndo, in which the magical realism of previous Latin American authors is supplanted by modern realism, often with a technological focus. His work has won several awards. He has lived in the United States since 1991, and has taught literature at Cornell University since 1997.

== Career ==
Some early pieces were published while he was still at high school. However, he started writing seriously at age 19 when he was in Buenos Aires, studying International Relations. He transferred to the University of Alabama in Huntsville, receiving a football scholarship. A year before graduating, his first collection of short stories, Las máscaras de la nada, was published in Cochabamba.

He has resided in the United States since 1991. He graduated B.A. in political science in 1991. His first novel, Días de papel was a finalist in the 1991 Letras de Oro literary competition for United States works. The novel won the Erich Guttentag Prize, and was published in 1992.

He obtained an M.A. in Hispanic Languages and Literatures in 1993, and a PhD in Hispanic Languages and Literatures in 1997, both at University of California, Berkeley. His PhD thesis was on the life and works of Alcides Arguedas; stemming from this research, a biography was published in 2003. He was awarded a Guggenheim Fellowship in 2006.

Río fugitivo (1998) is at one and the same time a Bildungsroman, a detective mystery novel, and a historico-political novel about Bolivia.

Two of his novels have been translated into English. La materia del deseo (1991) was published in English (2004) as The Matter of Desire, and El delirio de Turing was published in English as Turing's Delirium in 2006. In Turing’s Delirium, Paz Soldán rewrote entire sequences directly in English for the translated edition, and changed the fundamental motivation of one of the characters; a subsequent Spanish version from Argentina incorporated these changes, but the widely circulated edition is the previous edition from Spain.

In 2011, he became the first Bolivian to be published by Gallimard. In 2011, he chaired the jury committee for the first Premio de las Américas for the best work published in Spanish in 2010.

Norte, published in 2011, depicts three experiences of Latin American immigration to the US over an 80-year span. Billie Ruth was published in 2012.

His first science fiction novel, Iris, published in 2014, was inspired by an article in Rolling Stone magazine about psychopathic soldiers in Afghanistan. The book was originally conceived as the last in a trilogy with Los vivos y los muertos (2009) and continued with Norte (2011); he had not initially intended it to be science fiction.

He is cultural and political columnist for several newspapers and magazines: La Tercera, El País, The New York Times, Time and Etiqueta Negra. He has translated some English works to Spanish, including Much Ado About Nothing by Shakespeare and The Seller of Dreams by Ernesto Quiñonez, a US author from Ecuador. His own works have been translated into several languages and have appeared in anthologies in Europe and America. He teaches Latin American Literature at Cornell University.

Reviewers have identified in his work a prominent example of the Latin American literary movement known as McOndo, which replaces the magical realism of previous Latin American authors with a technological, modernistic realism. According to Mario Vargas Llosa, he is one of the most original among the new generation of Latin American authors.

== Works ==
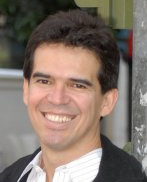
Paz Soldán, 2008

=== Novels ===
- Días de papel (Los Amigos del Libro, Cochabamba, 1992)
- Alrededor de la torre (Nuevo Milenio, Cochabamba, 1997)
- Río fugitivo (Alfaguara, La Paz, 1998; revised edition Nuevo Milenio, Cochabamba, 2008)
- Sueños digitales (Alfaguara, La Paz, 2000; Santillana USA 2001)
- La materia del deseo (Alfaguara, Miami, 2001; Madrid, 2002; English translation: The Matter of Desire by Lisa Carter, 2004)
- El delirio de Turing (Alfaguara, La Paz, 2003; English translation: Turing's Delirium by Lisa Carter, 2006)
- Palacio Quemado (Alfaguara, Miami, 2006; La Paz, 2007)
- Los vivos y los muertos (Alfaguara, Madrid, 2009)
- Norte (Mondadori, Barcelona, 2011; English translation: Norte by Valerie Miles, University of Chicago Press, 2016)
- Iris (Alfaguara, 2014)

=== Stories ===
- Las máscaras de la nada (Los Amigos del Libro, Cochabamba, 1990)
- Desapariciones (Ediciones Centro Simón I Patiño, Cochabamba, 1994)
- Dochera y otros cuentos (Nuevo Milenio, La Paz, 1998)
- Amores imperfectos (Santillana, La Paz, 1998; Alfaguara, Buenos Aires, 2000; Suma de Letras, Madrid, 2002)
- Simulacros (Santillana, La Paz, 1999)
- Desencuentros (Alfaguara, 2004) - brings together the first two collections of short stories, Las máscaras de la nada and Desapariciones
- Lazos de familia (Grupo Editorial La Hoguera, Santa Cruz, 2008)
- La puerta cerrada y otros cuentos (Editorial Gente Común, La Paz, 2009)
- Billie Ruth (Páginas de Espuma, Madrid, 2012)

=== Essays and critical analyses ===
- Latin American Literature and Mass Media (Garland, 2000) - with Debra A. Castillo; chapter 4: The Avant-Garde and Cinematic Imaginary: Huidobro's novela-film
- Alcides Arguedas y la narrativa de la nación enferma (Plural Editores, La Paz, 2003)

=== Editor ===
- Se habla español. Voces latines en USA (Alfaguara 2000) - with Alberto Fuguet
- Bolaño salvaje (Candaya, Barcelona, 2008) - with Gustavo Faverón

=== Prizes and awards ===
- Finalist, Letras de Oro 1991 for Días de papel (US)
- Premio Erich Guttentag 1991 (or 1992?) for Días de papel (Bolivia)
- Premio Juan Rulfo 1997 for the story Dochera
- Premio Nacional de Novela (Bolivia) 2002 for El delirio de Turing
- Guggenheim Fellowship (2006)
- Finalist, Premio Hammett 2012, at Semana Negra de Gijón, for the novel Norte
- Finalist, Premio Celsius, at Semana Negra 2015 for Iris

=== Derived work ===
Two films by Alfonso Mayo, Wednesday Afternoon (2004) and Keeper of the Past (2005), are based on stories by Soldán.

=== See also ===
- Alberto Fuguet, McOndo Movement
- Giannina Braschi, author of United States of Banana
- Roberto Bolaño
- Hysterical Realism
