= Las películas de mi vida =

2002 semi-autobiographical novel by Alberto Fuguet

The Movies of My Life
- First edition
- Author: Alberto Fuguet
- Original title: Las películas de mi vida
- Translator: Ezra E. Fitz
- Language: Spanish
- Genre: Semi-autobiographical novel
- Publisher: Rayo
- Publication date: 2002
- Publication place: Chile
- Media type: Print (Hardback & Paperback)
- Pages: 287
- ISBN: 0-06-053462-1
- OCLC: 52154048
- Dewey Decimal: 863/.64 21
- LC Class: PQ8098.16.U48 P4513 2003

Las películas de mi vida (translated as The Movies of My Life: A Novel) is a 2002 semi-autobiographical novel by Chilean writer Alberto Fuguet.

== Plot summary ==
The protagonist of the novel recounts his life story, which oscillates between Chile and California. He begins by describing his early years spent in California and uses the movies he watched during that time to paint a picture of his life. However, he is forced to abruptly return to Chile during his early teens, where he must now live under the regime of Augusto Pinochet, which proves to be a major cultural shock for him.
