= Macondo =

Fictional town created by Gabriel García Márquez

Macondo (Spanish pronunciation: [maˈkondo]) is a fictional town described in Gabriel García Márquez's novel One Hundred Years of Solitude (as well as several others of his works). It is the hometown of the Buendía family.

== Aracataca ==
Macondo is often supposed to draw from García Márquez's childhood town, Aracataca, near the north (Caribbean) coast of Colombia, 80 km south of Santa Marta.

In June 2006, there was a referendum to change the name of the town from Aracataca to Macondo, which ultimately failed due to low turnout.

== Etymology ==
In the first chapter of his autobiography, Living to Tell the Tale, García Márquez states that he took the name Macondo from a sign at a banana plantation near Aracataca. He also mentions the fact that Macondo is the local name of the tree Cavanillesia platanifolia, which grows in that area.

== Fictional history ==
The town first appears in García Márquez's short story "Leaf Storm". It is the central location for the subsequent novel One Hundred Years of Solitude. He later used Macondo as a setting for several other stories.

In In Evil Hour, published the year before One Hundred Years of Solitude, García Márquez mentions Macondo as the town where Father Ángel was succeeded by the one-hundred-year-old Antonio Isabel del Santísimo Sacramento del Altar Castañeda y Montero, a clear reference to the novel to come.

In the narrative of One Hundred Years of Solitude, the town grows from a tiny settlement with almost no contact with the outside world, to eventually become a large and thriving place, before a banana plantation is set up. The establishment of the banana plantation leads to Macondo's downfall, followed by a gigantic windstorm that wipes it from the map. As the town grows and falls, different generations of the Buendía family play important roles, contributing to its development.

The fall of Macondo comes first as a result of a four-year rainfall, which destroyed most of the town's supplies and image. During the years following the rainfall, the town begins to empty, as does the Buendía home.

== In popular culture ==
The town of Macondo is the namesake of the Macondo Prospect, an oil and gas prospect in the Gulf of Mexico, where the Deepwater Horizon oil spill began in April 2010. In addition to this usage, other popular culture references follow:

- Early in the 1974 film Chinatown, Jake Gittes spies on Hollis Mulwray at the fictional "El Macondo Apartments". Production director Richard Sylbert says this was indeed a reference to the fictional town created by García Márquez in One Hundred Years of Solitude.
- Russian rock band Bi-2 released as part of their 2006 album Milk (Молоко) a song called "Macondo" ("Макондо"). The chorus repeats: "Rain was falling on Macondo, right in the middle of the century" ("На Макондо падал дождь, в самой середине века"). Bi-2 first obtained popularity in 2000, with the release of their first hit "No One Writes to the Colonel" ("Полковнику никто не пишет"), the title of a novella by Gabriel García Márquez.
- Given the town's association with magical realism, many Latin Americans would portray the everyday illogical or absurd news and situations they or their respective countries face as more aptly belonging to Macondo. As a result, some Latin Americans occasionally refer to their home towns or countries as Macondos. The Latin American McOndo phenomenon of the mid-1990s (started by the anthology of the same name), a counter-reaction to magical realism and the region's literary Boom of the 60s and 70s, derives its name from the portmanteau of the words Macondo and McDonald's.
- Macondo is the name of a refugee settlement in Simmering, a municipality on the outskirts of Vienna, Austria, named after Garcia Márquez's fictitious town by Chilean refugees. It has been home to successive waves of refugees since Hungarians came en masse after the revolution of 1956, followed by Czechoslovak and Romanian waves in 1968, Vietnamese boat people and Chileans fleeing Pinochet in the early 1970s. Many of these refugees and their descendants still live in the settlement as "permanent refugees," while new waves from current headlining wars from around the world keep arriving: Somalia, Afghanistan, Iraq, Chechnya, etc.
- The Marquéz Family in the indie video game Kentucky Route Zero owns a house on Macondo Lane.
- In Light Over Liskeard by Louis de Bernières, the main character's best friend Theodore Pitt stayed close to Macondo and Aracataca before.
