= Jorge Volpi =

Mexican novelist and essayist (born 1968)

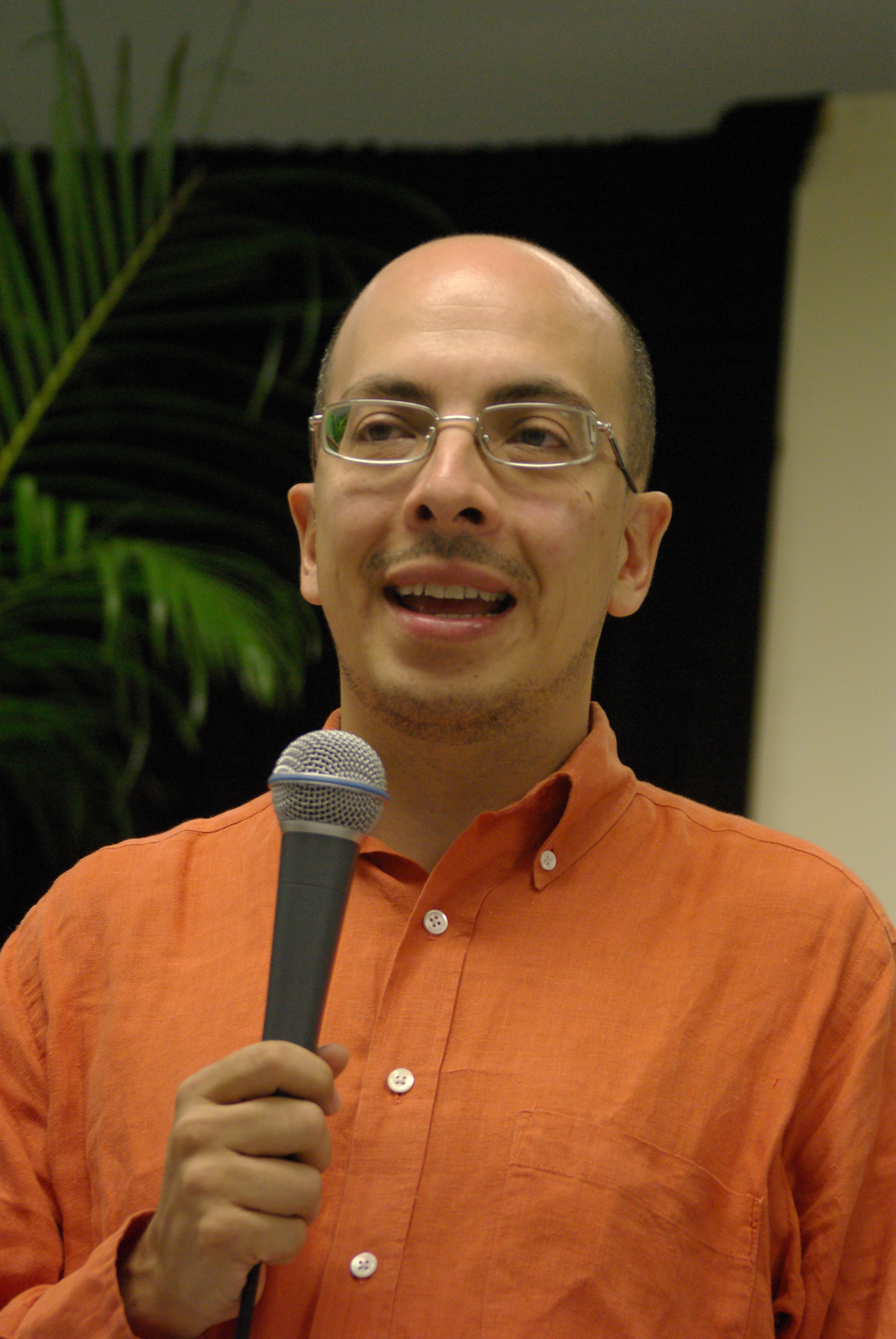
- Jorge Volpi at the Miami Book Fair International 2011
- Born: July 10, 1968 (age 58); Mexico City
- Occupations: Novelist; Short story writer Professor
- Writing career
- Genre: Fiction
- Literary movement: Crack generation
- Website: Blog

Jorge Volpi (full name Jorge Volpi Escalante; born July 10, 1968) is a Mexican novelist and essayist, best known for his novels such as In Search of Klingsor (En busca de Klingsor). Trained as a lawyer, he gained notice in the 1990s with his first publications and participation in the pronouncement of the "Crack Manifesto" with several other young writers to protest the state of Mexican literature and promote their own work. Volpi's novels are distinct from magical realism and other trends of Latin American literature as they focus on the actions of characters and research into academic topics, especially history and science, and do not always focus on Latin American characters and settings. His work has been translated into twenty five languages and recognized with awards such as Biblioteca Breva Award and the Debate-Casa de América as well as a grant from the Guggenheim Foundation. In addition to his writing he has worked as a cultural attaché, the director of Canal 22 in the State of Mexico and is currently the director of the Festival Internacional Cervantino.

== Life ==
Jorge Volpi was born in Mexico City. Since childhood, he has been interested in history and science. At age thirteen, he wanted to be a historian, specializing in the Middle Ages, attempting to write a book on the entire topic. He stated much of his interest in science was sparked by watching Carl Sagan's Cosmos on television. He decided later in life to abandon these for literature, but these interests remain and appear in his writing.

Volpi attended high school at the Centro Universitario México in Mexico City, later doing his undergraduate work in law at the National Autonomous University of Mexico and receiving his masters from the same institution in Mexican literature. He also worked on writing at the Centro de Escritores Mexicanos, with Carlos Montemayor and Ali Chumacero.

For almost three years in the early 1990s, Volpi worked as a secretary to Diego Valades, the first attorney general for the Federal District of Mexico City and later the attorney general for Mexico. He was working with politicians, police and judiciary at a turbulent time, with among other things, the Chiapas uprising. During this time, in 1994, he was in Oaxaca, when a state government official there was assassinated, giving him the idea for a later novel called La paz de los sepulcros. Although published ten years later, one month before the Luis Donaldo Colosio assassination, he wrote a part of the book where a political assassination occurs much the way Colosio's did, one month before it happened. The book also discussed the fall of the Institutional Revolutionary Party.

In 1996, Volpi moved to Spain to do his doctorate at the University of Salamanca. He spent three years there, earning his degree in Hispanic philology with his thesis about poet Jorge Cuesta. During his time in Spain, he also began work on the novel En busca de Klingsor. He met with and shared experiences there with fellow writer Ignacio Padilla, crediting him as an indirect influence on the work. He also learned German as part of research into the book at this time.

In 2001, he was named director of the Mexican Cultural Center in Paris, living in Paris for three years. He was also offered the opportunity to be a cultural attaché for the Mexican embassy in Italy, but rejected the offer. He served as a jury member for the Guadalajara International Book Fair, which awarded this institution's prize to Bryce Enchenique, later accused of plagiarism.

In 2007, he became the director of Canal (Channel) 22, the government cultural television station of the State of Mexico. He reformed the station and how it is perceived by the public.

In 2013, he was named the director of the Festival Internacional Cervantino in Guanajuato, the most important cultural festival in Latin America.

Since 2007, he has taught Mexican literature and other topics at universities on three continents, at institutions such as the National Autonomous University of Mexico, Emory, Cornell, Universidad de las Américas Puebla, University of Pau and Pays de l'Adour, the Catholic University of Chile and the Universidad Marista in Guadalajara. Since 2012, he has been a visiting professor at Princeton, where he currently lives.

He has stated that he does not want fame, that it is better suited for singers, actors and television personalities. Writers need to be on the margin.

== Writing career ==
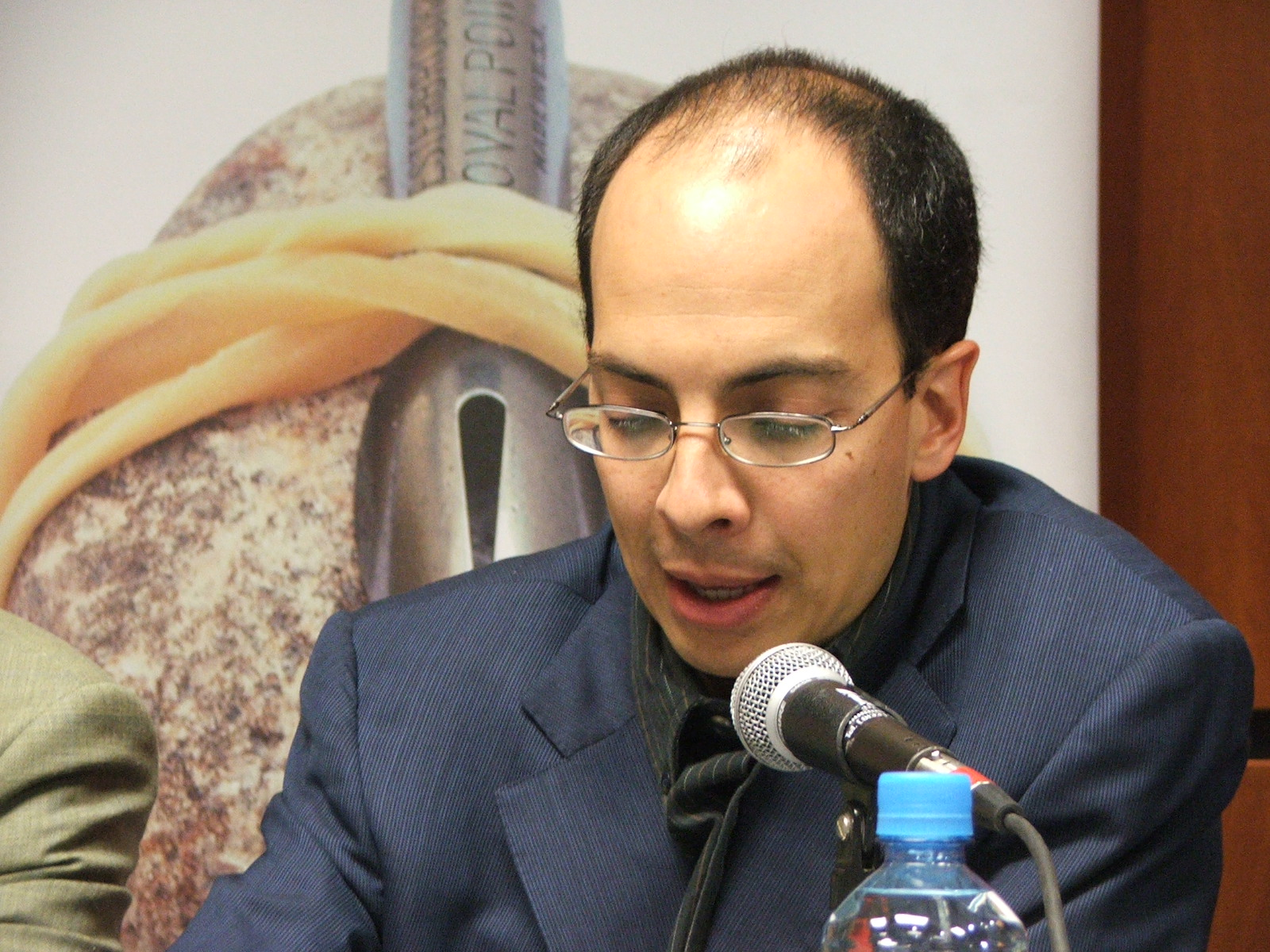
Jorge Volpi during the presentation of Revuelta, a cultural magazine, held at the Guadalajara´s Book Fair, in 2005.

Volpi is best known for his novels and essays, with nine novels published. He decided to become a writer after reading Carlos Fuentes' Terra Nostra because it convinced him that writing can recreate history. Later, Volpi became friends with Fuentes after the older writer praised En busca de Klingsor. Volpi's works have been translated into twenty five languages, with his work influential in both Spanish and English as his style has differed from what has been produced in either of these languages.

Volpi's first two published works are a series of short stories called Pieza de forma de sonata (1991) at age 23 and novel A pesar del oscuro silencio (1992).

On August 7, 1996, Volpi, along with Eloy Urroz, Ignacio Padilla, Ricardo Chávez Castaneda and Pedro Angel Palau, all Mexican authors under the age of thirty, met at the Centro Cultural San Angel to read their "Crack Manifesto", which expressed frustration with the socio-political system with apocalyptic themes associated with the end of the millennium. This is what the word "crack" refers to. This followed the planning of near-simultaneous publication of five works by the group, mostly as a protest against the then dominant "literature light" novels as well as current events, with the books carrying the label of "crack novels." They called themselves the "Crack Generation" and it has been referred to as a movement, but it was more of a convergence in the writing of Volpi and the other authors. These "crack novels" brought immediate notoriety to Volpi and the others, but the Mexican cultural press reviewed the phenomenon with little consensus as to its place. Some accused the group of a publicity stunt and others called it a breakthrough. Later in life, Volpi referred to it as an experiment. The group has remained friends and colleagues and have published a reflection on the experience as Crack. Instrucciones de Uso.

Volpi's most successful novel is En busca de Klingsor, which itself has been translated into nineteen languages, breaking sales records in Europe and has been read over German radio. The book is the first of a trilogy which includes El fin de la locura (2004) and No sera la Tierra (2006). The book received the 1999 Premio Biblioteca Breve in Spain and the 2000 Deux Océans-Grinzane Cavour Award in France.

In addition to books, Volpi writes book reviews and essay for Mexican cultural press, collaborating with Reforma, The Nation, the Confabulario supplement and the magazines Viceversa, Letra Internacional and Letras Libres. He also contributes to the El País newspaper in Spain.

In addition to the awards for En busca de Klingsor, Volpi has won the 1990 Plural de Ensayo Prize, the 1991 Vuelta Prize in Essay (for El magisterio de Jorge Cuesta), the 2008 Mazatlán Prize (for Con Mentiras), the 2009 Debate-Casamérica Essay Prize (for El insomnia de Bolívar), the 2012 Planta-Casa de América in Madrid (for La tejedora de sombras) and the José Donoso Iberoamerican Prize for his collective work.

Volpi has also received grants from the Guggenheim Foundation and has been a member of the National System of Creators in Mexico. He is a Knight of the Order of Arts and Letters of France and a Knight of the Order of Isabella the Catholic of Spain.

== Publications ==
=== Fiction ===
- Pieza en forma de sonata (1990)
- A pesar del oscuro silencio (In Spite of the Dark Silence) (1993)
- Días de ira (1994)
- La paz de los sepulcros (The Peace of Tombs) (1995)
- El temperamento melancólico (1996)
- Sanar tu piel amarga (1997)
- En busca de Klingsor (In Search of Klingsor) (1999)
- El juego del Apocalipsis (The Game of the Apocalypse) (2000)
- Pieza en forma de sonata, para flauta, oboe, cello y arpa, Op. 1, Cuadernos de Malinalco (1991)
- El fin de la locura (The End of Madness) (2003)
- No será la tierra (2006)
- El jardín devastado, Alfaguara, mezcla de memoria, ficción y aforismos (2008)
- Oscuro bosque oscuro (2009)
- Días de ira. (2011)
- La tejedora de sombras (2012)
- La paz de los sepulcros (2013)
- Memorial del engaño (2014)
- Una novela criminal (2018)

=== Essays ===
- Mentiras contagiosas: Ensayos (2008).
- Mexico: Lo que todo ciudadano quisiera (no) saber de su patria (2006)
- Crack. Instrucciones de uso (2005)
- La guerra y las palabras. Una historia intelectual de 1994 (2004)
- La imaginación y el poder. Una historia intelectual de 1968 (1998)
- El insomnio de Bolívar (2009)
- Leer la mente. El cerebro y el arte de la ficción (2011)

== Influences and style ==
Volpi's novels have a writing style which is distinct from other Latin American literature, especially from magical realism. His novels are entertaining and informative, stressing research and detection and have been compared to "airport novels" as they also include elements of intrigue, romance and sex. However, they also appeal to readers interested in ethical questions, as well as complex systems of interrelations, making them similar to the "novelas totalizantes" of the 1960s. He is the only major writer of this kind of novel in Spanish and has been "accused" of not being Latin American enough for his distinctive style and subject matter. Volpi disputes this.

His first notable work were the "novelas de crack" publishing in the 1990s in which he rejected the then dominant "literature light" and focused less on the language and more on the actions of the characters. He felt literature light trivialized the link between literature and knowledge. This novels, which include La paz de los sepulcros, El tempermento meloncólico and Sanar tu piel amarga were writing during the Carlos Salinas de Gortari administration, when Mexican politics and economy were under great strain. This influence remains in his work as he still focuses on developing his characters before he starts the novel. Even though these sketches change, it allows Volpi to "know" them and a few important features to help describe them briefly, like a first impression in real life.

Volpi has stated that "The novels I like to read and the ones I try to write are those that consider fiction as a vehicle of knowledge." He believes that "a novel is a form of exploring the world." His novels show great effort to research an area of knowledge to incorporate this into the story, with the main characters often also involved in the discovery of knowledge. In A pesar del oscuro silencio, the main character is researching the tragic life of Jorge Cuesta, a Mexican vanguard poet and essayist of the 1920s and 1930s. Similarly, the protagonist in Tribuna del escandolo also engages in biographical research, but in this case to solve a double murder. In El temperamento melancolico, Volpi psychologically analyzes the idea of human temperament, exploring group dynamics and the effects of individual actions. The story here is of a German film director making his last film in Mexico, with Volpi focuses on the ten Mexican actors and their roles in the film. In La tejedora de sombras, the subject matter is the psychoanalysis of Carl Jung. Memorial del engaño is about the 2008 financial crisis and the revelation that much of the world economic order was due to communist spies. Volpi's best known work, En busca de Klingsor, is the first of a trilogy that not only traces the development of scientific knowledge of the latter 20th century, but also aligns it to the political and social thought of the same era. He begins in the first book with relatively theory and quantum mechanics questioning much of how we see existence, (developed inside the search for Hitler's chief scientific advisor just after World War II), It is followed by El fin de la locura set from the May 1968 demonstrations in Paris to the Fall of the Berlin Wall. No será la Tierra is about the end of communist ideal in the 20th century.

For Volpi, literature is to satisfy his curiosity and search for knowledge, including knowledge about himself, preferring to use first-person narrators. For Volpi, the novel is a vehicle for knowledge about identity in action, placing readers in a position to observe the how human behavior works. He generally writes about identity as a mixture of character, temperament and will. His stories are often experiments to place certain temperaments together to analyze their interactions. However, knowledge in Volpi's novels is a search rather than explaining what is already known and it is never complete, generally related to the concept of identity and human behavior.
