= Eloy Urroz =

Mexican writer

- Born: 1967 (age 58–59)
- Education: B.A. from UNAM; M.A., Ph.D. from University of California
- Occupations: Writer, professor of Spanish
- Writing career
- Genre: Novel
- Notable works: The Obstacles; Friction; The Family Interrupted
- Movement: Crack Movement

Eloy Urroz (born 1967) is a Mexican writer and Professor of Spanish and Latin American Literature at The Citadel in South Carolina. Though born in New York, Urroz grew up in Mexico City and is of Mexican nationality. He is one of the founding members of the Crack Movement, along with such writers as Ignacio Padilla and Jorge Volpi. Urroz has written eight novels, four books on literary criticism, four books of poetry, three political reportages and dozens of essays, articles, and reviews on Latin American and Peninsular Culture and Literature. Some of his novels have been translated into English, French, Italian, Portuguese, and German. In the United States, his novels are published by Dalkey Archive Press.

== Work ==
Eloy Urroz's novels are known for their complex structures and forms. Barbara Hoffert, writing in a starred review for Library Journal, praises Urroz's "fluid, propulsive language and passionate exploration of ideas." In an interview with Theodore McDermott, Urroz said this about his own writing: "Every novel is different. I don't like to repeat myself. I don't believe in formula. I just want to challenge myself. I don't have preconceived ideas. I never know why I have to write what I write about—I just do it."

== Works in Translation ==
- Obstacles (Dalkey Archive Press, 2006)
- Friction (Dalkey Archive Press, 2010)
- The Family Interrupted (Dalkey Archive Press, 2016)
