= Ignacio Padilla =

Mexican writer (1968–2016)

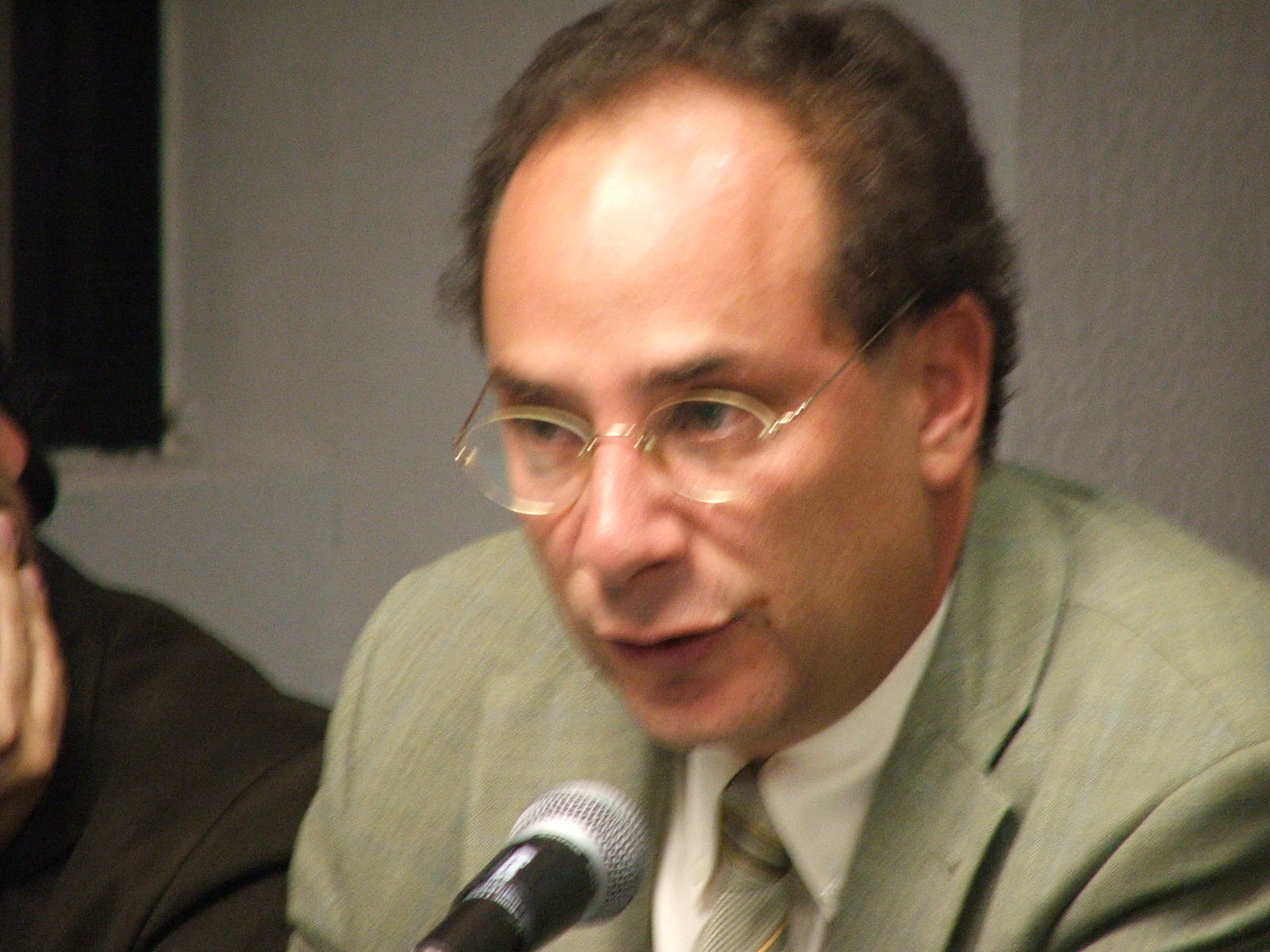
- Ignacio Padilla during the presentation of Revuelta, a cultural magazine, held at the Guadalajara International Book Fair in 2005.
- Born: November 7, 1968; Mexico City
- Died: August 20, 2016 (aged 47)
- Occupations: Writer; critic; diplomat
- Writing career
- Period: 1989–2016
- Genres: Novel; essay; short story
- Literary movement: Crack generation

Ignacio Padilla (November 7, 1968 – August 20, 2016) was a Mexican writer whose works were translated into several languages. Padilla helped found the Crack Movement, along with fellow writers Eloy Urroz, Jorge Volpi, and Pedro Angel Palou, as a means for Mexican authors to find their own voice and write beyond magic realism.

== Biography ==
=== Early life ===
Padilla was born in Mexico City in 1968. From an early age, Padilla noted that he was drawn to writing, and as he grew older, he became immersed in the literary works of James Joyce, Fyodor Dostoevsky, and Robert Louis Stevenson, whose works often centered on the theme of human identity.

=== Education ===
Padilla attended high school at Waterford Kamhlaba United World College of Southern Africa in Mbabane, Eswatini, and thereafter received his undergraduate education at the Universidad Iberoamericana where he was awarded a Bachelor of Arts in Communication Studies. He later received a Master's degree in English Literature from the University of Edinburgh and a Doctor of Philosophy in Hispanic-American literature from the University of Salamanca.

=== Early career ===
Upon completing his higher education, Padilla returned to Mexico. During the early 1990s, Padilla worked as an editorial director for Playboy magazine's Latin American publication while also writing his column, "El baúl de los cadáveres", in Mexican literary magazine Sábado.

In 1989, Padilla received the Alfonso Reyes literary award for his work "Subterráneos", and in 1994 the Juan de la Cabada literary award for his children's story "Las tormentas del mar embotellado", the Juan Rulfo Literary Award for a first novel, "La catedral de los ahogados", and the Malcolm Lowry Literary Award for his literary essay "El dorado esquivo: espejismo mexicano de Paul Bowles". That same year, Padilla published "El año de los gatos amurallados", which was awarded the Kalpa literary award for Science Fiction.

=== The Crack Generation ===
In 1996, Padilla joined with longtime friends and fellow writers Jorge Volpi, Eloy Urroz, Pedro Ángel Palou García, and Ricardo Chávez Castañeda, who collectively presented a proposal based on their literary criticism and personal opinions of Mexican and Latin American literature. This literary critique, a reaction to the Latin American Boom, became known as the Crack Manifesto and was presented as a means for Mexican authors to find their own voice, and write beyond Magic Realism. In addition to breaking with the Latin American tradition of Magic Realism, the Crack Movement called for a return to the complexity of plot and style as found in the works of such Latin American authors as Julio Cortázar and Jorge Luis Borges. That same year, Sandro Cohen published Nueva Imagen, a collection of stories by the authors of the Crack Movement.

In 1999 Padilla received the José Revueltas literary award for his literary essay "Los funerales del alcaraván: historia apócrifa del realismo mágico", as well as the Gilberto Owen literary award for his short story publication "Las antípodas y el siglo". In 2000, Padilla received the Premio Primavera de Novela for his novel "Amphitryon".

=== 21st century ===
In 2001, Padilla was chosen as Cultural Attaché for the Mexican embassy to the United Kingdom, a post he held until 2003. During this time, he republished "Crónicas africanas" which he had previously published in Mexican literary magazine "Nostromo."

In 2007, President Felipe Calderón Hinojosa named Ignacio Padilla director of the José Vasconcelos National Library. However, the structure of the building in which the library was housed was unsafe, and in March 2007 the decision was made to temporarily close it. Padilla released a statement that repairs to the building were absolutely necessary, and that he would not open the doors until the building was safe from structural damages. On August 15, 2007, the newspaper Milenio Diario published an article stating that Padilla had stepped down as director of the national library.

=== Death ===
On the night of August 20, 2016, Padilla was killed in a car accident while driving at the central state of Querétaro. He was 47 years old.

== Books translated into English ==
- Shadow Without a Name (2003)
- Antipodes (2005)

== Selected works ==
- "Funeral Among the Oyameles" (essay)
- "The Sad Fate of the Graduate Rocamadour Muskaria" (story)
