= Crack Movement =

The Crack Movement, or literature of the Crack generation (Spanish: la generación del "crack"), describes a literary movement in Mexico that began in the mid-1990s. It was initiated by a number of young Mexican authors who broke with literary conventions in what is thought to have been a reaction to the Latin American Boom. Notable contributors include: Ignacio Padilla, Jorge Volpi, Eloy Urroz, Pedro Ángel Palou and Ricardo Chávez Castañeda.
