= Alberto Fuguet =

Chilean writer and film director

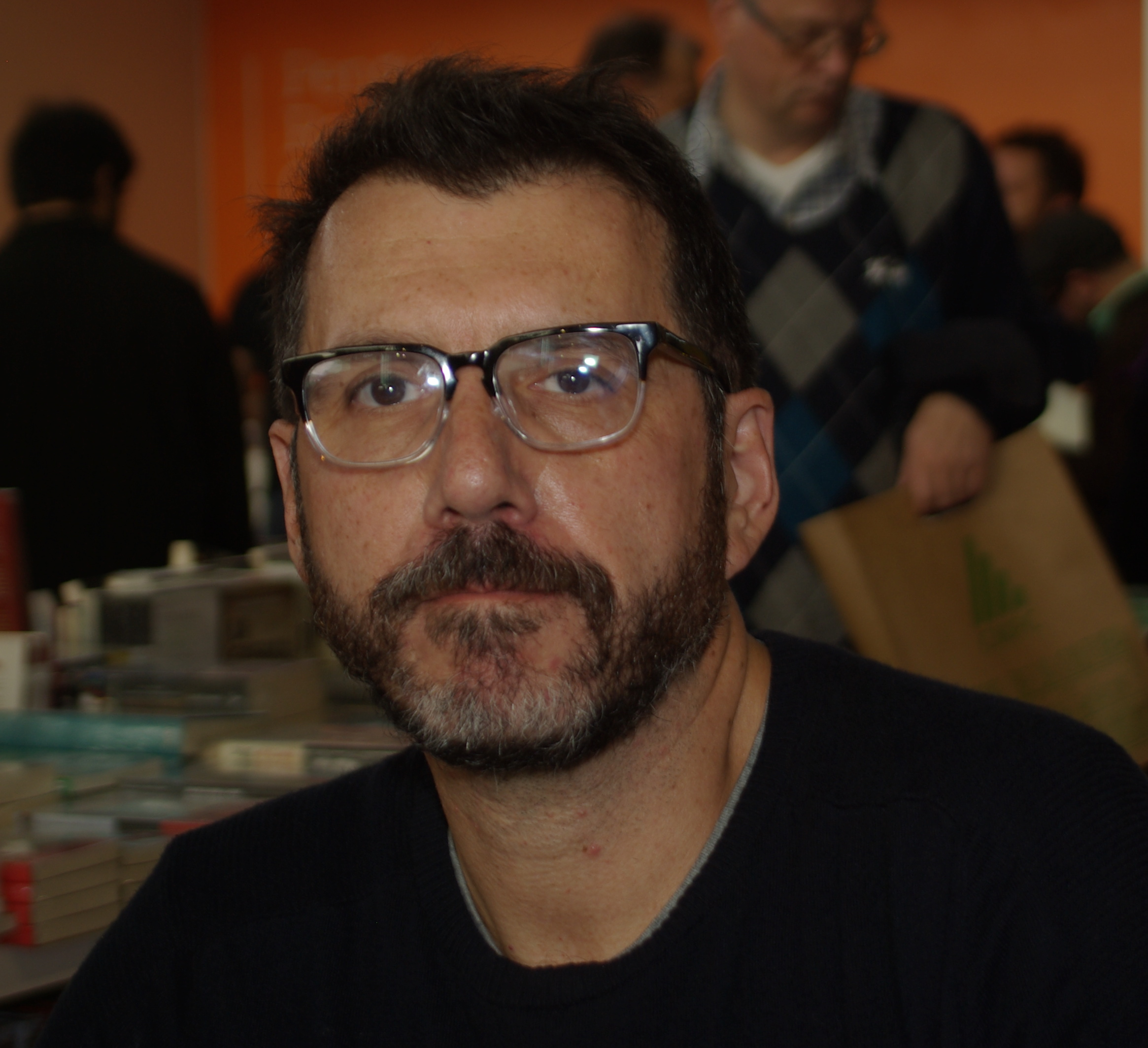
- Fuguet in 2015
- Born: Alberto Felipe Fuguet de Goyeneche; 7 March 1963 (age 63); Santiago, Chile
- Occupations: Writer; journalist; film critic; film director
- Website: Fuguet in Cinépata

Alberto Felipe Fuguet de Goyeneche (pronounced [alˈβeɾto fuˈɣet]; born 7 March 1963) is a Chilean author, journalist, film critic and film director who rose to critical prominence in the 1990s as part of the movement known as the New Chilean Narrative. Although he was born in Santiago, he spent his first 13 years of life in Encino, California. He was among the fifty Latin American leaders selected by Time magazine and CNN in 1999, and he appeared on the front page of Newsweek magazine in 2002.

== Biography ==
Fuguet was born in Santiago, Chile, but his family moved to Encino, California, where he lived until age 13. He is a graduate of the University of Chile's School of Journalism.

In 1999 Time called Fuguet one of the 50 most important Latin Americans for the next millennium. In 2003, he was featured on the cover of the international edition of Newsweek magazine to represent a new generation of writers.

Fuguet currently heads the program in contemporary audiovisual culture at the Universidad Alberto Hurtado's School of Journalism in Santiago. He also writes for the newspaper El Mercurio and is at work on two new projects: the film Perdidos and the book Missing.

== Writing ==
Fuguet's work is characterized by a United States/Chilean hybridity, with constant cross-references to the popular cultures of the two nations. In 1996 he co-edited (with Sergio Gómez) the anthology McOndo, whose title combined McDonald's with Macondo, the fictional town created by Gabriel García Márquez. McOndo represented popular culture while largely rejecting the use of magical realism in contemporary Latin American fiction.

Fuguet's other books are the short story collections Sobredosis and Cortos; the novels Mala onda, Por favor, rebobinar, Tinta roja and Las películas de mi vida; and the non-fiction collection Primera parte. Mala onda, which narrates a week in the life of a Santiago teenager in 1980, has received wide acclaim. Tinta roja has been made into a film. Las películas de mi vida is a semi-autobiographical novel about a Chilean seismologist who grew up in California and later returned to Chile. Its protagonist recounts his life with references to movies he has watched. Some of Fuguet's work, including Mala onda and Las películas de mi vida, has been translated into English and published in the United States.

2007 saw the release of Road Story, a graphic novel illustrated by Gonzalo Martínez based on one of the stories in Cortos. Under the Alfaguara imprint, the book is claimed by Fuguet and by his sometime-collaborator Francisco Ortega to be the first Chilean graphic novel issued by a major publisher.

=== Selected works ===
==== Novels ====
- Mala onda
- Tinta roja
- Por favor rebobinar
- Las películas de mi vida (2003) translated in the United States as The Movies of My Life by Harpercollins, 2003
- Missing (2010)
- No Ficción (2015)
- Sudor (2016)
- Ciertos chicos (2024)

==== Short stories ====
- "Sobredosis"
- "Cortos" – translated in the US as "Shorts", HarperCollins in 2005

==== Graphic novel ====
- Road Story

==== Filmography ====
- Todo A La Vez (Everything At Once) (2021)
- Siempre sí (2019)
- Cola de mono (2018)
- Invierno (2015)
- Locaciones: buscando a Rusty James (2013)
- Música Campesina (2011)
- Velódromo (2010)
- 2 horas (2009)
- Se arrienda (2005) (co-written with Francisco Ortega)
- Las hormigas asesinas (2005)
- En un lugar de la noche (aka Dos hermanos) (writer) (directed by Martín Rodríguez, 2000).
