= McOndo (book) =

1996 Spanish literary anthology

- Author: Alberto Fuguet and Sergio Gómez eds.
- Language: Spanish
- Genre: Realism
- Publisher: Grijalbo Mondadori
- Publication date: 1996
- Publication place: Spain
- Media type: Print Paperback
- Pages: 262 pages

McOndo is the 1996 literary anthology that spawned the McOndo movement.

== History ==
Around 1994, Chilean writer Alberto Fuguet participated in an International Writer's Workshop which took place at the University of Iowa. There Fuguet attempted to present a short-story to the Iowa Review for publication. As the works of Latino authors were very popular at the time, Fuguet believed his chances of getting his works translated and published were quite high. However, upon reading Fuguet's work, the editor was convinced that the lack of magical realist or fantastical components in the narrative made it seem as if, "the story could have taken place right there in [the United States of] America." Consequently, the story was rejected on the grounds that 'it was not Latin American enough'. In response to the rejection of American editors, a short story anthology was compiled bearing the title McOndo. Edited and introduced by Alberto Fuguet and Sergio Gómez, the anthology of new Latin American literature was first published in Spain in 1996. The work compiled 17 short stories written by authors, all of whom were from either Latin America or Spain. All of the contributors were males who had primarily commenced their literary careers in the 1990s and all were born after the late 1950s. The contributing authors distanced themselves from the magical realism genre as they believed it did not correctly represent modern Latin America, which in the 1990s was full of "shopping malls, cable television, suburbs, and pollution". Alternately, the authors wished to focus on the erasure of nations, borders and geographical identities as a result of expanding transnational networks while exploring the effects of globalization on economy and culture. In one essay, Fuguet railed against the picturesque, exotic stereotypes that the publishing world had come to expect of Latin writers, citing well-known Cuban author-exile Reinaldo Arenas's pronouncement that the literary world expected Latin American novelists to tackle only two themes: underdevelopment and exoticism. Fuguet wrote that he does not deny that there are picturesque, colourful, or quaint aspects to Latin America, but that the world he lives in is too complicated and urban to be bound by the rules of magical realism. In the end, the primary focus of the anthology was the introduction, which was considered to be more in the vein of an essay rather than a literary work.

== Works cited ==
- Fuguet, Alberto (1997). "I am not a magical realist!". Salon. Archived from the original on 25 January 2011.
- Fuguet, Alberto (2001). "Magical Neoliberalism". Foreign Policy (125): 66–73. doi:10.2307/3183328. JSTOR 3183328.
- Hidalgo, Emilse Beatriz (2007). "National/transnational negotiations: the renewal of the cultural languages in Latin America and Rodrigo Fresáns Argentine History, The Speed of Things and Kensington Gardens". LL Journal. 2 (1): 1–11. Archived from the original on July 19, 2011.
