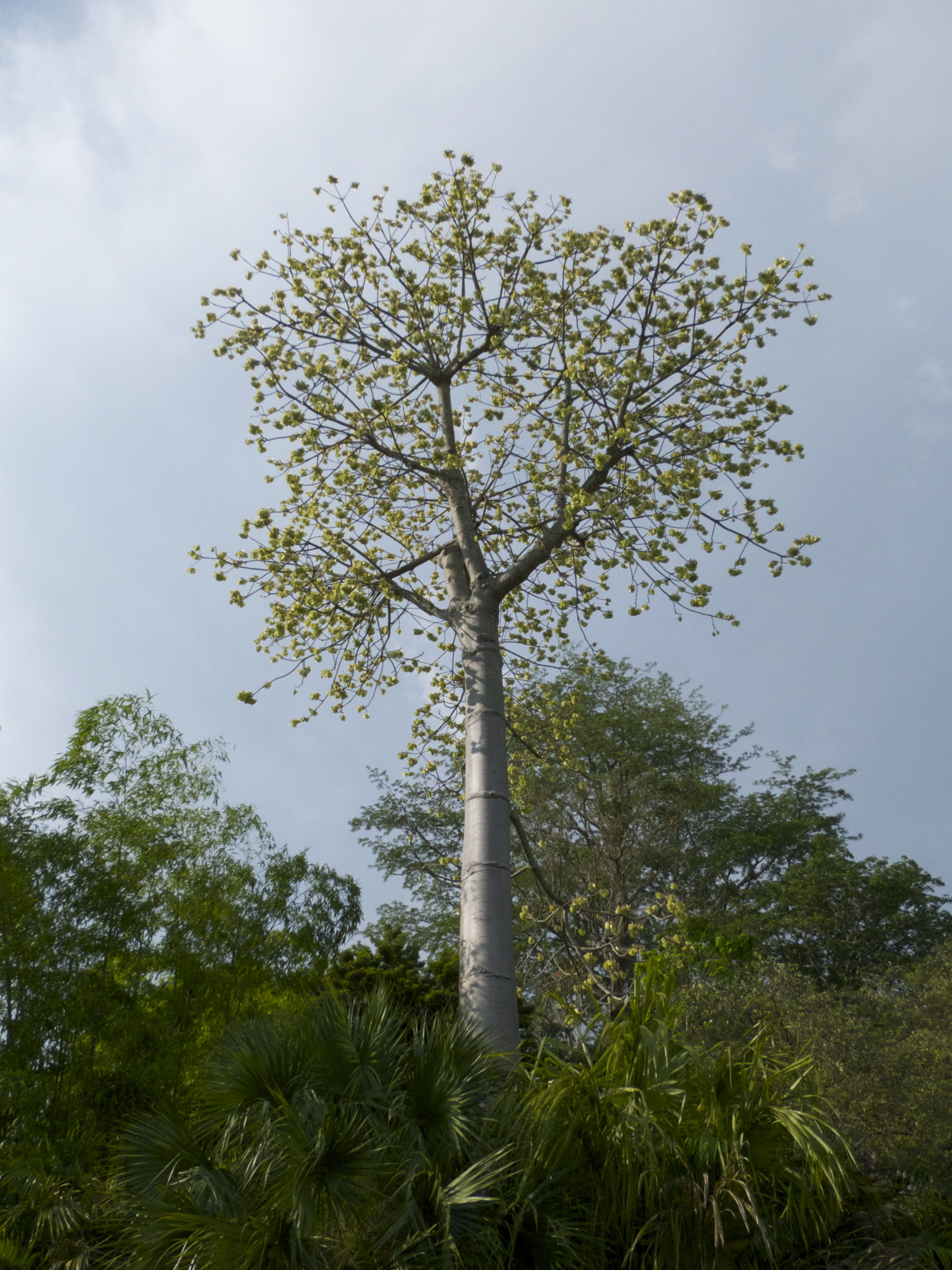

Conservation status
- Near Threatened (IUCN 2.3)

Scientific classification
- Kingdom: Plantae
- Clade: Tracheophytes
- Clade: Angiosperms
- Clade: Eudicots
- Clade: Rosids
- Order: Malvales
- Family: Malvaceae
- Genus: Cavanillesia
- Species: C. platanifolia

Binomial name
- Cavanillesia platanifolia (Humb. & Bonpl.) Kunth
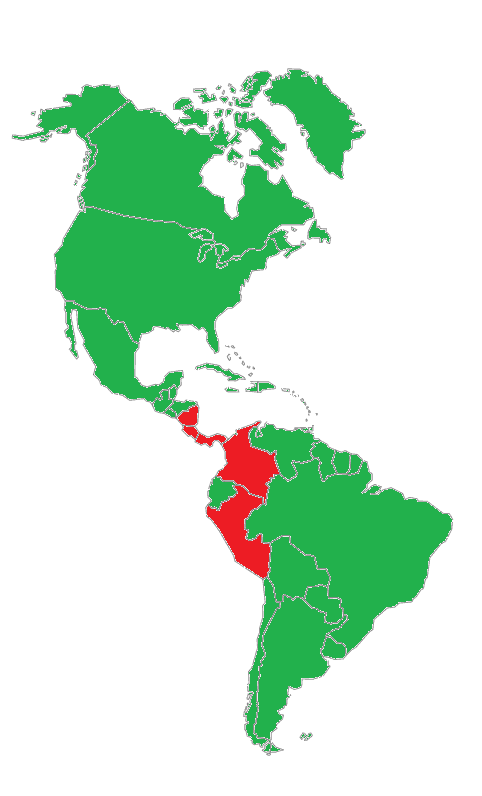

Synonyms
- Pourretia platanifolia Humb. & Bonpl.

= Cavanillesia platanifolia =

Species of tree

Cavanillesia platanifolia, known as pijio, bongo, pretino, petrino, cuipo, hameli or hamelí in Spanish or macondo, is a flowering plant species in the family Malvaceae. It grows in lowland rainforests in Nicaragua, Costa Rica, Panama, Colombia, Ecuador, and Peru.

The tree grows to 45–60 metres (148–197 feet) in height, with leaves only near the top for one month a year. Its reddish-gray bark has characteristic rings along the entire trunk. The roots are orangish-brown.

A root fragment can be cut off and cleaned (while kept horizontal) then tipped to pour water, which has a taste of potatoes. Rope can be made from the inner bark of branches and saplings.

The extremely soft wood, along with balsa wood, is one of the softest woods according to the Janka hardness test.

== Historical uses ==
During World War II, Cavanillesia platanifolia was explored as an alternative to balsa wood, which was used in the construction of the British warplane De Havilland Mosquito. Since balsa wood only grew in Ecuador, its supply was of particular concern as it was feared that demand would exceed the supply needed for the mass production of Mosquitoes. The British sent an agent to explore Colombia, Costa Rica, El Salvador, Guatemala, Honduras, Nicaragua, and Panama, and while doing so, discovered that possible substitute for balsa (Cavanillesia platanifolia) could be found in found in the Darién Province of Panama, called cuipo. Samples were sent to de Havilland who used them to construct an experimental fuselage which testing proved that it met the required standard. This led to a local workforce being hired and trained and a sawmill established by 1942 on an island in the Tuira River.
