= Biomorphism =

Art movement

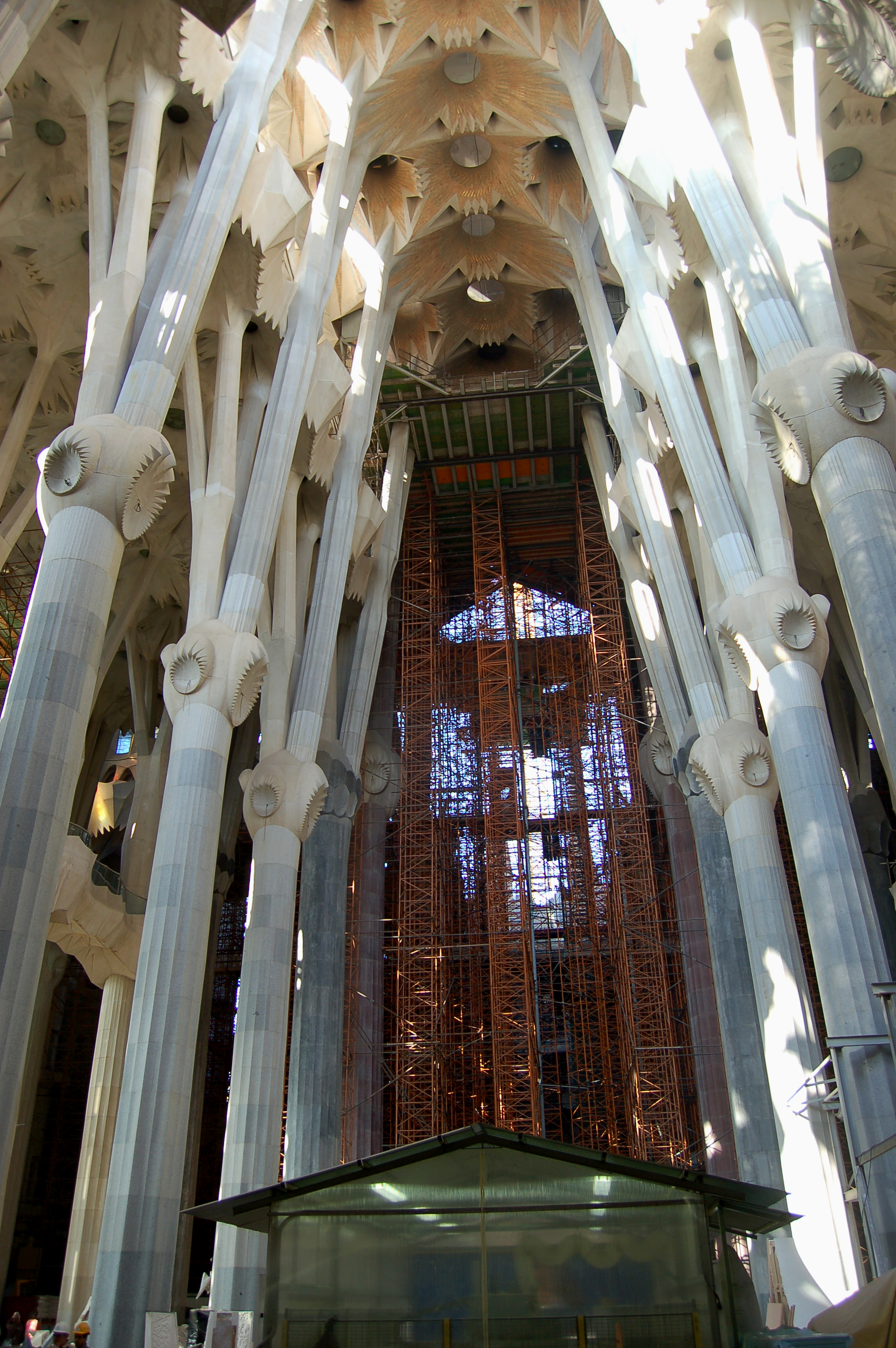
Biomorphic branching columns in Gaudí's monumental but still incomplete Sagrada Família church are modelled on trees.

Biomorphism models artistic design elements on naturally occurring patterns or shapes reminiscent of nature and living organisms. Taken to its extreme, it attempts to force naturally occurring shapes onto functional devices. In his search for architectural reform the French architecte Viollet le Duc is the first to express this idea clearly : Like a botanist, Viollet le Duc analyzes details of nature in his books, subsequently making them undergo metamorphoses.

== History ==
Within the context of modern art, the term was coined by the British writer Geoffrey Grigson in 1935 and subsequently used by Alfred H. Barr in the context of his 1936 exhibition Cubism and Abstract Art. Biomorphist art focuses on the power of natural life and uses organic shapes, with shapeless and vaguely spherical hints of the forms of biology. Biomorphism has connections with Surrealism and Art Nouveau.

The Tate Gallery's online glossary article on biomorphic form specifies that while these forms are abstract, they "refer to, or evoke, living forms...". The article goes on to list Joan Miró, Jean Arp, Henry Moore, and Barbara Hepworth as examples of artists whose work epitomises the use of biomorphic form.

== In painting ==
The paintings of Yves Tanguy and Roberto Matta are also often cited as exemplifying the use of biomorphic form. During and after World War II, Yves Tanguy's landscapes became emptier, which has been seen as a psychological portrait of wartime Europe.

The use of metamorphosis through Picasso influenced Surrealism in the 1920s, and it appeared both as subject matter and as procedure in the figurative paintings of Leonora Carrington and in the more abstract, automatic works of André Masson.

American artist Phoebe Adams is known for her biomorphic paintings and sculptures, which are in many museum collections. Desmond Morris, author of "The Naked Ape: A Zoologist's Study of the Human Animal", is a biomorphic painter whose works are in museum collections, including the National Portrait Gallery in London.

American artists Andrew Topolski, Michael Zansky, Suzanne Anker, Frank Gillette, Michael Rees, and Bradley Rubenstein participated in exhibitions featuring biomorphic and biospheric paintings and digital art at Universal Concepts Unlimited (2000–2006). Michael Zansky's series, "Giants and Dwarves," spanned 5,000 square feet of carved, burned, and painted wooden panels with biomorphic forms.

== In architecture ==
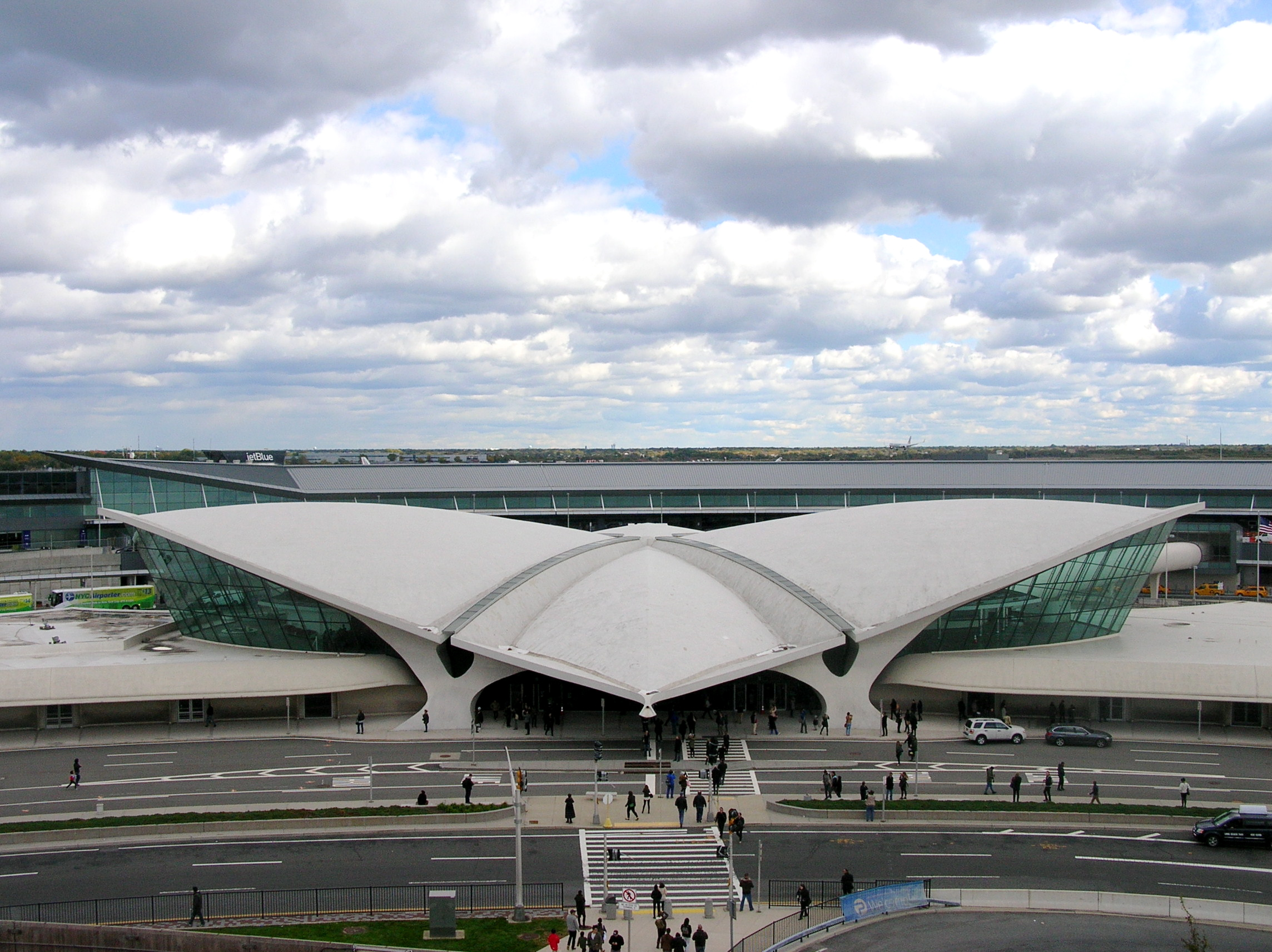
TWA Flight Center 2015.7

The Sagrada Família church by Antoni Gaudí in Barcelona contains many features inspired by nature, such as branching columns intended to reflect trees.

Other well known examples of biomorphism in architecture can be found in the Lotus Temple in New Delhi, by Fariborz Sahba, based on a lotus flower, and the TWA Flight Center building in New York City, by Eero Saarinen, inspired by the form of a bird's wing.

One of the leading contemporary architects that uses biomorphism in his work is Basil Al Bayati, a leading proponent of the school of Metaphoric architecture whose designs have been inspired by trees and plants, snails, whales and insects such as the Palm Mosque at the King Saud University in Riyadh, or the Al-Nakhlah Palm Telecommunications Tower, which are based upon the form of a palm tree, or the Oriental Village by the Sea, in the Dominican Republic that is based upon the segmented body of a dragonfly.

== In industrial design ==
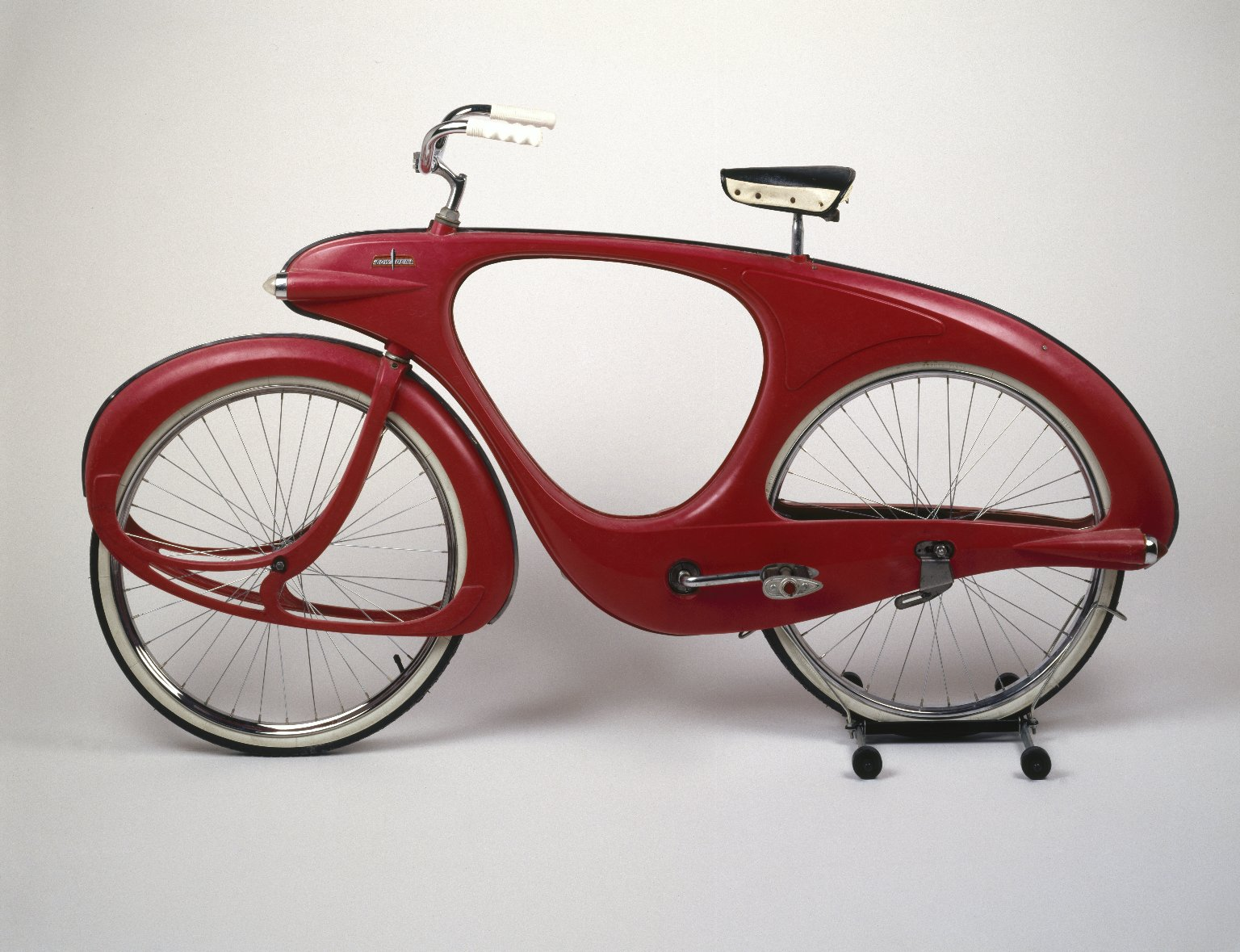
Spacelander Bicycle designed by Benjamin G. Bowden in 1946; Manufactured 1960. Brooklyn Museum

Biomorphism is also seen in modern industrial design, such as the work of Alvar Aalto, and Isamu Noguchi, whose Noguchi table is considered an icon of industrial design. Presently, the effect of the influence of nature is less obvious: instead of designed objects looking exactly like the natural form, they use only slight characteristics to remind us of nature.

Victor Papanek (1923–1999) was one of the first American industrial designers to use biomorphic analysis in his design assignments. He reached international prominence while at Purdue University 1964–1970. Student work and his work is illustrated in his book Design for the Real World, published in 1970, which challenges the industrial design establishment to design for the handicapped and disadvantaged throughout the world. First published in 1970 by Bonnier in Swedish, it was published in English in 1971 by Pantheon and eventually translated and published in 23 languages. It is perhaps the most widely read book on design.

Gaetano Pesce is an Italian designer who creates brightly colored acrylic furniture in biomorphic and human shapes.

Marc Newson is an Australian biomorphic designer who created a Charlotte chair (1987) and three-legged carbon-fibre Black Hole table (1988).

== See also ==
- Biomimetic architecture
- Metaphoric architecture
- Organic architecture
- Zoomorphic architecture
- Zoomorphism
