= Donald Kuspit =

American art critic and a poet (born 1935)

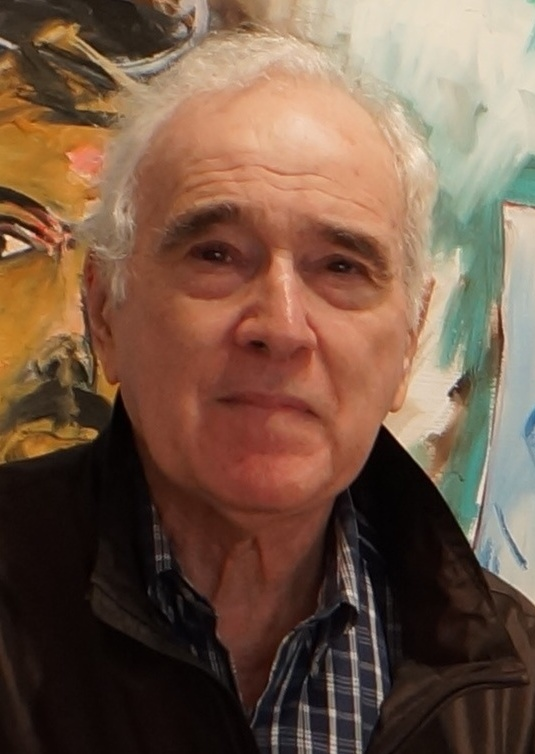
- Donald Kuspit, September 2012
- Born: March 26, 1935 (age 91)
- Education: Columbia University
- Occupations: Art critic and poet

Donald Kuspit (born March 26, 1935) is an American art critic and poet, known for his practice of psychoanalytic art criticism. He has published on the subjects of avant-garde aesthetics, postmodernism, modern art, and conceptual art.

== Education ==
Kuspit graduated from Columbia College in 1955, and earned a M.A. from Yale University in 1958. He received his PhD in philosophy from the Goethe University Frankfurt in 1960. Kuspit next taught at Pennsylvania State University and became increasingly interested in art history. He earned a M.A. there in 1964.

Kuspit is a Fulbright Scholar and has taught philosophy and American studies at Saarland University and University of Windsor. He earned a PhD in art history from the University of Michigan in 1971.

== Academic career ==
=== Teaching positions ===
Kuspit is a Distinguished Professor Emeritus of Art History and Philosophy at the State University of New York at Stony Brook and School of Visual Arts. He was the A. D. White Professor-at-Large at Cornell University (1991–1997). In 1983, he received an honorary doctorate in fine arts from Davidson College, in 1996 from the San Francisco Art Institute, and in 2007 from the New York Academy of Art. In 1998 he received an honorary doctorate of humane letters from the University of Illinois at Urbana-Champaign. In 2005 he was the Robertson Fellow at the University of Glasgow. In 2008 he received the Tenth Annual Award for Excellence in the Arts from the Newington-Cropsey Foundation.

=== Awards and grants ===
He received the Frank Jewett Mather Award for Distinction in Art Criticism in 1983 (given by the College Art Association). In 1997, the National Schools of Art and Design presented him with a citation for Distinguished Service to the Visual Arts. In 2014 he was the first recipient of the Gabarron Foundation Award for Cultural Thought. He has received fellowships and grants from the Ford Foundation, Fulbright Program, National Endowment for the Arts, National Endowment for the Humanities, Guggenheim Foundation Fellowship, and Asian Cultural Council.

== Art criticism ==
- Noah Becker's Whitehot Magazine of Contemporary Art, (2024 to present) https://whitehotmagazine.com/contributors/donald-kuspit/947
- The New Subjectivism: Art in the 1980s (1986)
- The Inner Voice Visualized: Alfred DeCredico's Abstractions (1991)
- The Cult of the Avant-Garde Artist (1992)
- The Dialectic of Decadence (1993)
- The Photography of Albert Renger-Patzsch (1993)
- Signs of Psyche in Modern and Postmodern Art (1994)
- Primordial Presences: The Sculpture of Karel Appel (1994)
- Szczesny (1995)
- Health and Happiness in Twentieth Century Avant-Garde Art (1996)
- Idiosyncratic Identities: Artists at the End of the Avant-Garde (1996)
- Chihuly (1997)
- Jamali (artist) (1997)
- Joseph Raffael (1998)
- Daniel Brush (1998)
- Hans Hartung (1998)
- The Rebirth of Painting in the Late 20th Century (2000)
- Psychostrategies of Avant Garde Art (2000)
- Redeeming Art: Critical Reveries (2000)
- Don Eddy (2002)
- Hunt Slonem (2002)
- Hans Breder (2002)
- Steven Tobin (2003)
- April Gornik (2004)
- The End of Art (2004)
- F. Scott Hess (2006)
- New Old Masters (2007)
- William Conger (2008)
- Mia Brownell (2010)
- Leigh Rivers Aerial Perspectives (2012)
- Szczesny: Neue Wilden works from the 80s (2012)
- Yvelyne Wood (2012)
- Michael Zansky with Bradley Rubenstein (2014) ISBN 1938922506
- "Two Crowns of the Egg" with Michael Somoroff and Giannina Braschi (2014) ISBN 1938922506
- Marcus Reichert (2015)
- Commentary in The Mountain Lake Symposium and Workshop: Art in Locale (2018), a book by Ray Kass documenting the interdisciplinary workshop at Mountain Lake Lodge, Virginia.

== Poetry ==
- Self-Refraction (1983)
- Apocalypse with Jewels in the Distance (2000)
- On the Gathering Emptiness (2004)
- Disillusion (2018)

== Film appearance ==
- Ciria, (Pronounced Thiria) (2013), directed by Artur Balder
