= Bradley Rubenstein =

American painter and writer

Bradley Rubenstein (born 1963) is an American artist and writer who lives in Brooklyn, New York. His figurative paintings, prints, and drawings combine elements of biology, psychology, and art historical references.

== Early life and education ==
Rubenstein was born in LaGrange, Illinois in 1963. He attended the University of Illinois Urbana-Champaign and the Museum School in Boston.

== Work ==
Rubenstein's artwork is known for exploring the human form and how it might be manipulated and engineered in the future, creating hybrid characters. His paintings, photographs, and drawings reference genetic engineering and mutations, provoking discussion about the parameters and potential dissolution of self.

Untitled (Girl with Puppy-Dog Eyes) (1996), collection of The Metropolitan Museum of Art, New York, is a well-known piece. Rubenstein's works are also included in the collections of The Museum of Fine Arts, Boston; The Detroit Institute of Arts; The Krannert Art Museum Teaching Collection at The University of Illinois Urbana-Champaign; Harvard Art Museum; The Museum of the Moving Image, New York; Los Angeles County Museum of Art; Tang Teaching Museum, Saratoga Springs, New York; Fogg Art Museum, Cambridge, Massachusetts; and others. He has collaborated with such artists as Lucio Pozzi, Sue de Beer, Claude Wampler, Bjarne Melgaard, and Sarah Michelson to produce films, books, installations, and theatrical sets.

Rubenstein has written and edited a variety of articles and books on art and art education. He wrote The Black Album: Writings on Art and Culture, a collection of art reviews, published in 2018. He contributed reviews, interviews, and essays to ArtSlant, CultureCatch, M/E/A/N/I/N/G, The Brooklyn Rail, Sharkforum, and Artforum. He was a contributing editor for ArtKrush magazine, Art Journal, and New Observations.

Rubenstein also works as a production artist and set painter for television, film, video, and theater. He was the lead scenic artist for productions by Jonathan Demme, Spike Lee, Tom McCarthy, Jean-Marc Vallée, and Alfonso Cuarón. His film credits include Rosewater, The Bourne Legacy, Demolition, and Indignation; his work in television includes The Sopranos, Girls, and Blindspot.

== Exhibitions ==
In 1996, Rubenstein had his first solo exhibition at Automatic Art Gallery, Chicago, IL. Rubenstein has shown work both nationally and internationally at Clifford•Smith Gallery, Boston, CREON Gallery, Corraini Editions, Universal Concepts Unlimited, Galerie Oliver Schweden, Palazzo Costa, Sara Meltzer Gallery, Kunstlerhaus Hamburg, Annika Sundvik Gallery, Kunstlerhaus Bergedorf, and others.

He exhibited in group exhibitions and with other artists such as David Moriarty, Gary Stephan, Lucio Pozzi, Lynda Benglis, Michael Zansky, Claude Wampler, Ruth Hardinger, Mira Schor, Suzanne Anker, Frank Gillette, Andrew Topolski, and Larry Krone at Metropolitan Museum of Art; MOCA Detroit; Provincetown Art Museum, MA; Detroit Institute of Arts; Artists Space, NY; Lab Gallery, NY; Exit Art, NY, among others.

== Writing – reviews and interviews ==
- The Black Album: Writings on Art and Culture, Battery Journal, volume 1, issue 1, Meridian Art Press, New York, 2018.
- “It’s Not Blood, It’s Red,” M/E/A/N/I/N/G, November 11, 2016
- "Brenda Goodman Talks 50 Years of Fearless, Introspective Painting," Artslant, April 4, 2016.
- "Written on the Kitten: BASQUIAT: The Unknown Notebooks," The Black Album: Writings on Art and Culture, 2018.
- "The Thing Itself: Mira Schor + Bradley Rubenstein, Part 1," CultureCatch, December 30, 2011.
- "The Thing Itself: Mira Schor + Bradley Rubenstein, Part 2," CultureCatch, March 10, 2012.
- "South of Heaven: Henri Matisse: Radical Invention 1913-1917," The Black Album: Writings on Art and Culture, 2018.

== Grants and awards ==
- Emily Hall Tremaine Foundation/Grant, 2007.
- Pollock-Krasner Foundation/Grant, 2000.
- Künstlerhaus Hamburg/Fellowship, 1998.
- National Endowment for the Arts/Regional Fellowship in Painting, 1994.

== Selected bibliography ==
- Anker, Suzanne and Dorothy Nelkin. The Molecular Gaze: Art in the Genetic Age (Cold Spring Harbor Laboratory Press: Cold Spring Harbor, NY, 2004), p. 18.
- Barandiarán, Maria José. "Bradley Rubenstein at Automatic," New Art Examiner, November 1996, p. 30-31.
- Chambers, Tod. “The Art of Bioethics”, The Hastings Center Report, March–April 2005.
- Dalton, Jennifer. "Bradley Rubenstein/Annika Sundvik Gallery", Review, 10, February 15, 1997, pp. 28-29.
- Gerlach, Gunnar. "Kaugummis und Körper", Hamburger Rundschau, October 23, 1997, p. 49.
- Gerlach, Gunnar. "Halbe Hunde", Szene Hamburg, August 1998, p. 76-77.
- Goodeve, Thyrza Nichols. “Affinity for Surfing”, Sept–Oct., 2003.
- Grunenberg, Christoph, Michael Rees, and Stuart Servetar. “Minor Mutations”, Permanent, (cat.) Clifford•Smith Gallery, Boston, MA, 1999.
- Harris, Jane. “Science and Art: Dubious Bedfellows”. Artstar, Issue #26, October, 2000.
- Heiferman, Marvin, and Carole Kismaric. Paridise Now. Tang Museum, Saratoga Springs, NY, 2001.
- Levin, Kim. “Voice Choices”, Village Voice, December 9–15, 1998.
- Lloyd, Ann Wilson. “Bradley Rubenstein at Clifford • Smith”, Art in America, April 2000, pp. 162-63.
- Markus, Liz. "Bradley Rubenstein at Sara Meltzer Gallery", New Art Examiner, April 1999, p. 50.
- Schjeldhal, Peter. “DNART:Biomania”, The New Yorker, October 2, 2000, pp. 144-146.
- Semmelhack, Elizabeth. Bradley Rubenstein: Kate Moss on Mars, (cat.) Annika Sundvik Gallery, New York, NY, 1997.
- Servetar, Stuart. "Exquisite Corpse: Servetar Selects Bradley Rubenstein," Artnet Magazine, February 19, 1997.
- Vail, Amanda M. “Quantum Circus: The Intelligent Design Process”, NYARTS, March–April, 2007.
