= UCU =

UCU or Ucu may stand for:

== Institutions and organizations ==
- Universal Concepts Unlimited, New York City art gallery (2000-2006)
- Uganda Christian University, church-based university near Kampala, Uganda
- Ukrainian Catholic University, Catholic university in Lviv, Ukraine
- University College Utrecht, international Honors College of Utrecht University, Netherlands
- Urdaneta City University in the Philippines
- University and College Union, trade union for further-education and higher-education workers in the UK
- Catholic University of Uruguay (in Spanish: Universidad Católica del Uruguay)

== People ==
- Ucu Agustin (born 1976), Indonesian journalist, writer, and documentary filmmaker

== Biology ==
- UCU, a codon for the amino acid serine
