= Amertec Building =

Former office building in Florida, U.S.

- Interactive map of the Amertec Building area

General information
- Type: Office building
- Architectural style: Biomorphic
- Location: Hialeah, Florida, U.S., 149 W 21st St. Hialeah, Florida
- Coordinates: 25.8411°N 80.2847°W
- Demolished: February 2017
- Client: Amertec Granada LLC

Technical details
- Floor count: 2

Design and construction
- Architect: Chayo Frank

The Amertec Building was an office building, located at 149 W 21st St, Hialeah, Florida.

== History ==
The building was designed by Chayo Frank, who received the task from his father, the owner of Amertec-Granada, Inc. Chayo was tasked with creating a space for his father's architectural woodworking and to house his fixture manufacturing business. The building was an example of what Frank called an "organic entity."

Some areas of the building stood completely in free-form, such as the water flumes on the exterior, and the curved rebar, which was used to form the large geometric shapes.

In 1981, the Amertec building was sold by Frank's father and was offered for sale several times until its foreclosure in 2011. The building was then repainted white from its original metallic color and sold to Produce LLC for $1,000,000. In 2013, the Amertec building was again repainted to include orange and aqua colors. Frank's father's business operated until it was sold in 2002. In later years, the building was painted white and used as storage for a produce company. The building was demolished in February 2017.
