= Phoebe Adams =

American visual artist (born 1953)

- Born: 1953 (age 72–73); Greenwich, Connecticut, U.S.
- Education: Philadelphia College of Art, Skowhegan School of Painting and Sculpture, University at Albany, SUNY
- Known for: Painter, sculptor, educator

Phoebe Adams (born 1953) is an American painter, sculptor, and educator. She is known for her biomorphic artwork. Adams was active in New York City for a decade from 1985 to 1995, and has lived in Maine and New Mexico.

== Early life and education ==
Phoebe Adams was born in 1953 in Greenwich, Connecticut. She studied art at Philadelphia College of Art (BFA 1976; now the University of the Arts), Skowhegan School of Painting and Sculpture (in 1977), and University at Albany, SUNY (MFA 1978).

== Career ==
Adams' sculptures and paintings are biomorphic. A lot of her sculpture work is made in bronze, with colors expressed through the patina. Adams' abstract paintings are inspired on her walks in nature. From 1985 until 1995, her paintings and sculptures were regularly exhibited in New York City.

From 1989 until 1990, Adams was the 3-D department chair and an assistant professor at Moore College of Art and Design in Philadelphia. From 1991 until 2013, she was an associate professor of sculpture at Kutztown University of Pennsylvania.

In 1998, Adams was awarded a Pew Fellowship in the Arts grant by the Pew Center for Arts & Heritage. In 2020 and 2021, Adams was a MacDowell Fellow in Visual Arts at the artists' residency program.

Her work is part of museum collections including the Metropolitan Museum of Art, the Woodmere Art Museum, the Walker Art Center, the Brooklyn Museum, and the Pennsylvania Academy of the Fine Arts.
