= Jamali (artist) =

Pakistani-American painter

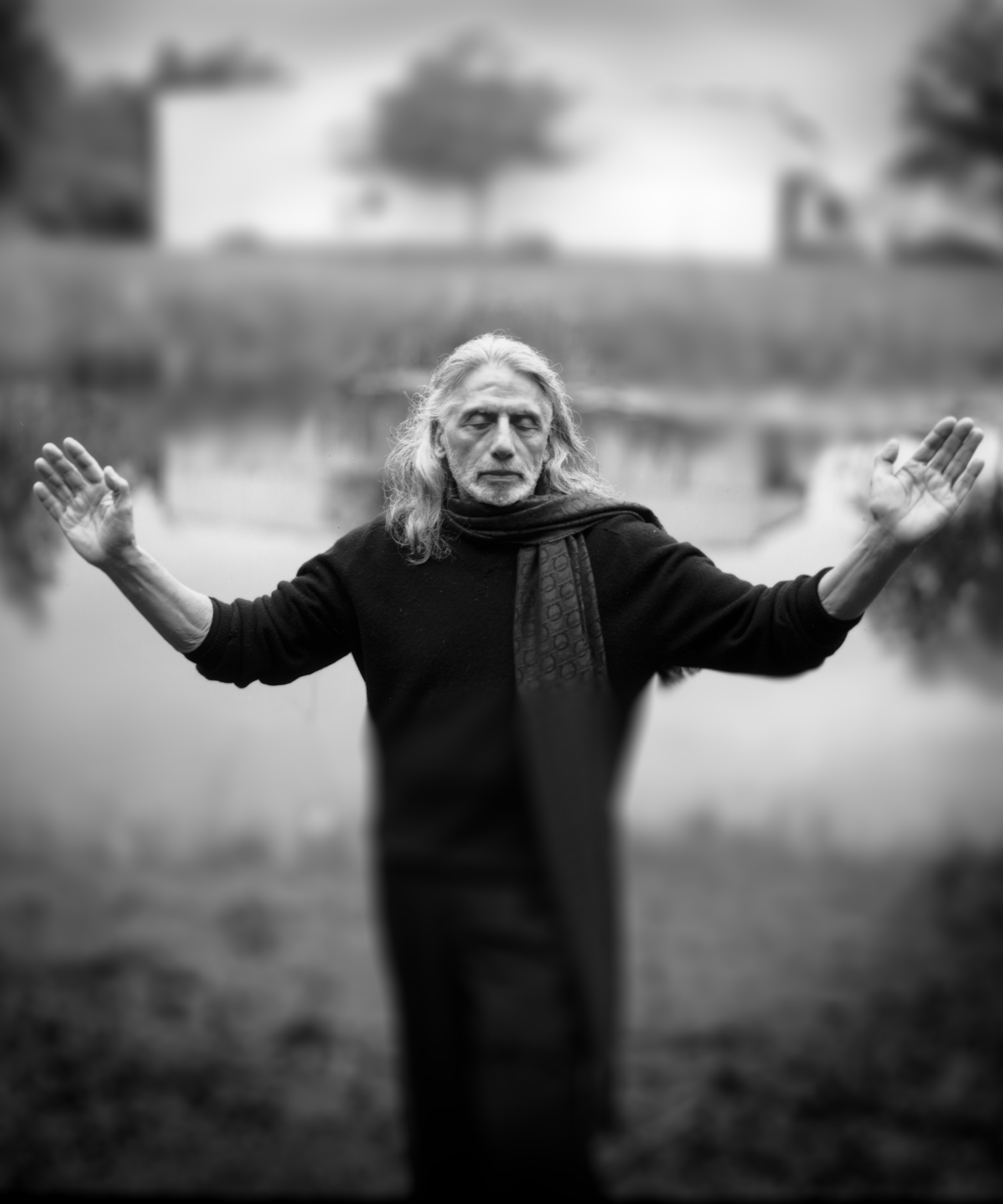
- Born: Aqdas Hussain Khan; April 12, 1944 (age 81); Peshawar, Pakistan
- Education: University of Florida, University of Peshawar
- Known for: Painting
- Style: Mystical Expressionism
- Movement: Neo-Expressionism
- Spouse: Karen Salicath (m. 2008)
- Patrons: Charles Kushner; Oprah Winfrey; Mike Tyson; Shaquille O'Neal; Kelsey Grammer; Elton John

Jamali (born Aqdas Hussain Khan, 1944 in Pakistan) is an American avant-garde artist. His artistic style has been termed Mystical Expressionism by art critic and historian Donald Kuspit. He is known for his unique, organic textures, experimental techniques, and figurative paintings of women. Currently his bestselling works are pigment on cork. He is a Sufi Muslim, and his spirituality is highly related to his art.

== Early life ==
Jamali was born Aqdas Hussain Khan on April 12, 1944, in Peshawar, Pakistan, to Shafquat and Ahmad Hussain Khan. His autobiography reports that his family was visited by a wise man who prophesied that the family would achieve greatness and should adopt the surname Jamali. As a teenager, Jamali attended the Cadet College Hasan Abdal, but left due to its warlike bent.

After the Indo-Pakistani War of 1965, Jamali made a pilgrimage to Tirich Mir and then traveled throughout Europe, seeking a stable home for his mission of Art and Peace. In Paris he met a number of American students studying abroad and decided to apply to the University of Central Florida to study Fine Art. Jamali moved to America in 1970 on a student visa to attend the University of Central Florida. He has been based in the US since then.

== Career ==
Aqdas Jamali started going by the mononym Jamali as he launched his career in the 1970s. In this time, the artist worked primarily in pastel on paper. After successful initial exhibitions, Jamali was inspired to embark upon more experimental methods and media, including but not limited to cork, egg tempera, and bronze. Today he is considered a prominent modern expressionist who owns and operates contemporary art galleries in New York and Florida.

== Books ==
Jamali's work is documented in two volumes, Mystical Expressionism and Mystical Expressionism - Dreams and Works, as well in his recently published autobiography Jamali: A Mystical Journey of Hope, The True Story of an American Artist (2023). Jamali launched Mardan Publishing, Inc., which offers limited edition artist proofs of his works as well as catalogs showcasing these prints and publications.

== Techniques ==
Jamali has created a number of his own styles and techniques in painting. For example, he produced his unique "Cork, Fresco Tempera" and "Pigment Dispersion" techniques to get, for example, more saturated color and depth to his surfaces. (For example in "Without Me X", top right)

Jamali also creates bronze sculptures in unusual ways, burying the clay or plaster model in the ground for weeks or months prior to casting, similar to his paintings.

== Business ==
The artist is represented internationally, and owns and operates three galleries.

=== Jamali Fine Art ===
Jamali's flagship operation is Jamali Fine Art in Winter Park, Florida. This is the operational core of Art and Peace, Inc., Mardan Publishing, Inc., and Jamali Fine Art, L.L.C. This location contains a gallery marketplace and an administrative center with amenities such as a full service frame shop, large-scale scanner, large format printer and an art studio for Jamali.

=== Jamali Gallery (Fort Lauderdale) ===
The Jamali Gallery in Fort Lauderdale is on the popular shopping street Las Olas Boulevard.

=== Jamali Gallery (New York City) ===
The Jamali Gallery in the SoHo district of New York City was established in 2006. The gallery offers regular events and exhibitions of the artist's work. It is in the historic Kochendorfer Building. (Note: as of June 2022 the New York Gallery has been relocated to our Winter Park, FL headquarters.)

== Solo exhibitions ==
Jamali has held over 100 one-man shows in the U.S. Selected exhibitions include:

- 2018 “Pastel Retrospective”, Jamali NYC Gallery, New York, November 4-January 1
- 2016 “The Shroud”, Jamali NYC Gallery, New York, May 1–June 30
- 2015 “Mystical Leaves”, Jamali NYC Gallery, New York, October 1–January 31
- 2015 “Three Mystics, Hands & Hearts”, Jamali NYC Gallery, New York, November 1, 2014–February 1
- 2012 Grand Opening, Jamali Gallery, Fort Lauderdale, Florida, November 15–16
- 2012 Gallery d’Orsay, Boston, Massachusetts, November 1–30
- 2012 Fifth Avenue Design Gallery, Naples, Florida, February 23
- 2010 “Nevelle”, Jamali NYC Gallery, New York, October 15–December 1
- 2009 “The Lost Horse”, Jamali NYC Gallery, New York, March 6–31
- 2008 “Four Horsemen“, Jamali NYC Gallery, New York, May 29–September 1
- 2008 “Four Horsemen”, Art Resources Gallery, Minneapolis, Minnesota, May 1–June 15
- 2008 “New York Muse“, Madison Gallery, La Jolla, California, August 1–31
- 2008 “Seven Steps to Heaven“, Jamali NYC Gallery, New York, February 2–April 23
- 2008 “Jamali: New Works”, New River Fine Art, Fort Lauderdale, Florida
- 2008 “Frescos”, Jamali Fine Art, Naples, Florida
- 2008 “Dancer”, Jamali NYC Gallery, New York, November 15, 2007–January 13
- 2008 “Day”, Jamali Fine Art, Naples, Florida, December 5–January 10
- 2007 “Day”, Jamali NYC Gallery, New York, September 13–November 11
- 2006 Syd Entel Galleries, Tampa Bay, Florida, October
- 2006 “Journey of Hope”, Jamali NYC Gallery, New York, December 7, 2005–January 20
- 2006 Art Miami, Miami, Florida, January 1–31,
- 2006 “Jamali: New Works”, Stellers Gallery, Jacksonville, Florida
- 2006 “Jamali: New Cork Paintings”, Onessimo Fine Art, Palm Beach Garden, Florida
- 2006 “Jamali: New Cork Paintings”, Art & Peace, Inc., Winter Park, Florida, June 1–3
- 2005 Chicago Navy Pier Art Show, Pop-n-Art Gallery, Chicago, Illinois, May 1–30
- 2005 Art Miami, Miami, Florida, January 1–31
- 2005 “Jamali: Mystical Expressionism / New Works”, Hilligoss Gallery, Chicago, Illinois
- 2005 “Jamali”, Gallery West, Hampton, Connecticut
- 2005 “Jamali: Cork Paintings”, Gallery d’ Orsay, Boston, Massachusetts
- 2005 “Jamali”, Onessimo Fine Art, Palm Beach Garden, Florida
- 2004 Art Miami, Miami, Florida, January 1–31
- 2004 “Jamali”, Onessimo Fine Art, Palm Beach Garden, Florida
- 2004 “Jamali: New Works”, Gallery Sono, Norwalk, Connecticut
- 2004 “Jamali Retrospective: 25 Years”, Art & Peace, Inc., Winter Park, Florida, May 1–30
- 2003 Toronto International Art Fair, Nikola Rukaj Gallery, Toronto, Canada, November 13–17
- 2003 New York Art Expo, New York, NY
- 2003 “Jamali: Mystical Expressionism”, Hilligoss Gallery, Chicago, Illinois
- 2003 “Jamali: Cork Paintings”, Gallery d’ Orsay, Boston, Massachusetts
- 2003 “Jamali”, Gallery Sono, Norwalk, Connecticut
- 2002 “Jamali: New Works”, Walker Fine Art, Denver, Colorado, July 19–August 30
- 2002 New York Art Expo, New York, NY
- 1998 Chicago Navy Pier Art Show, Art & Peace Inc., Chicago, Illinois, May 1–June 1
- 1995 Caesarea Gallery, Boca Raton, Florida, May
- 1992 Kenneth Raymond Gallery, Boca Raton, Florida, November
- 1991 Marie Ferrar Gallery, Winter Park, Florida, November
- 1991 “Jamali”, University of Central Florida, Orlando, FL
- 1990 Holly Hunt Ltd., Chicago, Illinois, November
- 1986 Holly Hunt Ltd., Chicago, Illinois, November
- 1985 “Man of Peace”, Maitland Art Center, Maitland, Florida, March 23-April 21
- 1985 Young & Co., Hobe Sound, Florida, April
- 1984 Maitland Art Museum, Maitland, Florida, December
- 1983 Riji Gallery, New York, NY, March
- 1983 Vered Gallery, East Hampton, NY, July
- 1983 Edna Hibel Gallery, New York, NY, March 4–31
- 1982 Hans Beck Gallery, Aachen, Germany, October
- 1981 Abasin Art Center, Peshawar, Pakistan, April
- 1980 Lehman Gallery, Gainesville, Florida, December
