= Michael Rees (artist) =

American sculptor

Michael Rees is an American artist practicing sculpture making, installation, animation, and interactive computing. He has exhibited his works widely, including at the Whitney Museum of American Art, New York, NY (1995 Whitney Biennial, 2001 Bitstreams Exhibition); Bitforms gallery, Universal Concepts Unlimited, The Aldrich Museum of Contemporary Art, Ridgefield, CT (Putto Large and Moving 2004, Pop Surrealism 1998, Best of Season 2001), The MARTa Museum, Herford, Germany (Putto 4 over 4 2005), and The Kemper Museum of Contemporary Art, Kansas City, MO (Putto 2x2x4 permanent installation of sculpture and animation). He has experimented with a broad practice that includes performance, interactive computer programs (the sculptural user interface), digital modeling and fabrication, animation, and video. Rees' work with digital media has been written about and illustrated in books, articles, and catalogues for exhibitions. His talk at the Rothko Chapel, Houston, Texas is also published.

== Education and teaching ==
Michael Rees was born in Kansas City, Missouri. He studied at Vassar College for two years with the social realist painter Alton Pickens. He transferred to the Kansas City Art Institute and worked with the installation artist Dale Eldred and the ceramics sculptor Jim Leedy. He graduated in 1982. He traveled to Germany in 1983-84 on a Deutscher Akademischer Austauchdienst (German Academic Exchange Service) award to study with Joseph Beuys and Gunther Uecker. In 1989 he graduated from Yale University in Sculpture where he studied with David Von Schlegal, Irwin Hauer, Vito Acconci, Alice Aycock, Frank Gehry and others. He met and worked with other artists at Yale including Matthew Barney, Katie Schimert, and Michael Grey and wrote an article about it

Rees teaches about sculpture and digital media at William Paterson University. He has taught at Oberlin College, The Kansas City Art Institute, Washington University in St. Louis, the New York Institute of Technology, and Rutgers University.

== Fellowships, honors, awards and grants ==
- 2008 Rockefeller Grant, Media Arts Fellow of the Tribeca Film Institute.
- 2007 New Jersey State Council on the Arts Individual Artist Fellowship recipient
- 2002 Creative Capital Grant
- 1999 National Endowment for the Arts for the exhibition Artificial Sculpture.
- 1999 Charlotte Street Fund Award for emerging artists.
