= Daniel Brush =

American jewelry artist (1947–2022)

Daniel Brush (January 22, 1947 – November 26, 2022) was an American painter, sculptor and jeweler.

== Biography ==
Daniel Brush was born in Cleveland, Ohio. He enrolled at the Carnegie Institute of Technology in Pittsburgh in 1965, from which he graduated with a bachelor of fine arts degree in 1969. He later graduated with a master of fine arts degree from the University of Southern California.

In the 1970s, he was an abstract painter and a tenured professor at Georgetown University. He had solo exhibitions at The Phillips Collection (1974), the Corcoran Gallery of Art (1976 and 1977) and the Fendrick Gallery on M Street NW.

He moved to New York City in 1977, where he acquired a loft in the Flatiron District, a former garment factory, which served as his studio and his home until his death. In this new location, he focused his work on metals and jewels.

In 1998, the Renwick Gallery of the Smithsonian American Art Museum organized the first exhibition of Brush's metalwork. It featured about 60 of his works.

He died in New York on November 26, 2022. He was survived by his wife Lynn Alpert (Olivia), whom he had married in 1967, and his son Silla.

== See also ==
- Granulation (jewellery)
