= Universal Concepts Unlimited =

Former art gallery in New York City

Universal Concepts Unlimited (UCU) was an art gallery in Chelsea, Manhattan, New York City that investigated the artistic merit of digital technologies based on the emerging digital art scene. UCU existed between the years 2000 and 2006. It was owned and run by Wolf-Dieter Stoeffelmeier and Marian Ziola.

== History ==
Universal Concepts Unlimited opened its doors at 507 West 24th Street in New York. The inaugural group exhibition, called ROUNDERS, opened on January 15, 2000. In 2006, Wolf-Dieter Stoeffelmeier and Marian Ziola separated and the gallery closed.

== UCU Artists ==
- Rebecca Allen
- Suzanne Anker
- Frank Gillette
- Joseph Nechvatal
- Michael Rees
- Osvaldo Romberg
- Bradley Rubenstein
- Michael Zansky
