= Michael Zansky =

American sculptor

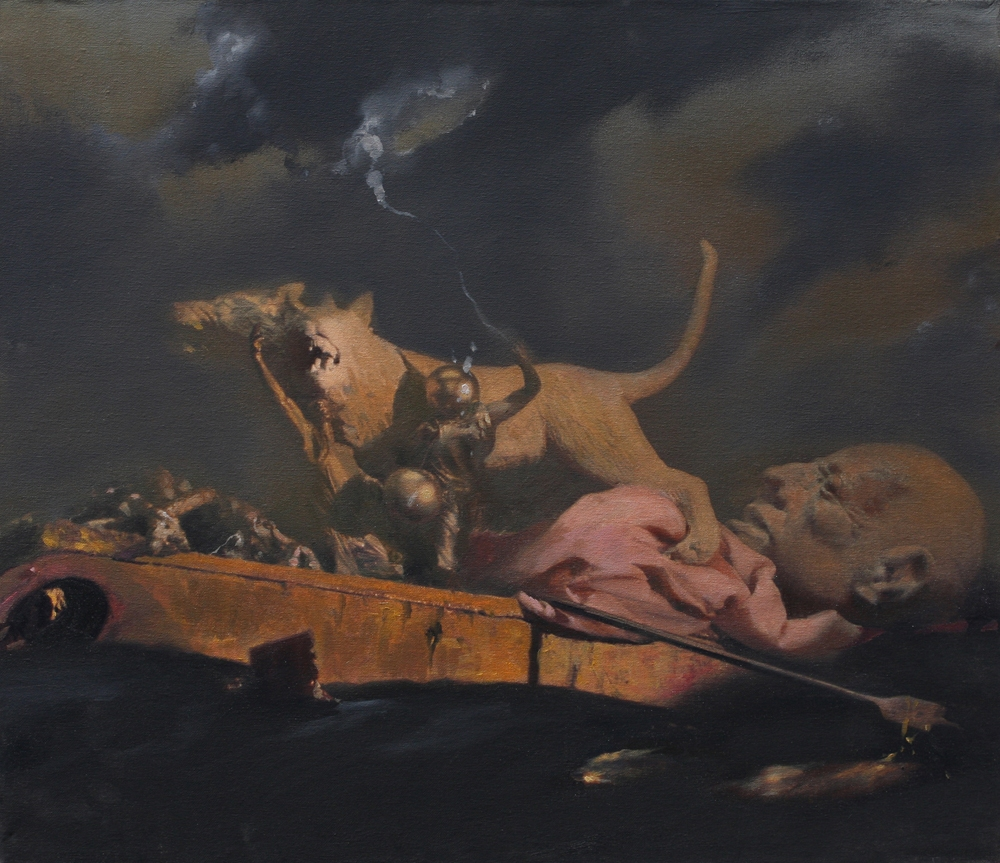
Valley of the Kings 4

Michael Zansky (born 1947, in the Bronx, New York) is an American artist working in installation art, sculpture, painting and photography.

== Early life ==
Michael Zansky was born in 1947 in the Tremont section the Bronx, into the family of Louis Zansky, a noted comic book illustrator. After graduating from New York City's High School of Music and Art, Zansky entered Boston University, Boston, MA, where he graduated in 1969. While attending Boston University, he heard lectures by Philip Guston. At Hunter College in New York, Zansky studied with Robert Morris and John McCracken.

== Career ==
=== Fine artist ===
Zansky's cycle History as Ruin, which began in 1992 with an exhibition at Berry-Hill Galleries, Exit Art and the Aldrich Contemporary Museum of Art, consists largely of 200 individually carved and painted 4 X 8 foot wooden reliefs and freestanding sculptures. In a catalog essay by Donald Kuspit, he states: “There is nothing like Zansky’s work in modern art, certainly not in contemporary art. It holds its own with Goya’s “Quinta del Sordo” paintings, and extends their fantasy into more irrational terra incognita than Goya ever imagined in his worst dreams.” In 1994, Zansky began a series of works collectively titled Traces. For the catalog essay on Zansky’s solo show at Berry-Hill Galleries, Inc., New York, NY, Thomas McEvilley wrote: “Zansky’s work participates in a common thematics of the post-Modern moment – a reconsideration of the relationship between nature and culture. In the Modernist period these forces had been regarded as rigorously separate and indeed antithetical. The triumph of culture would consist precisely in its domination of nature: the triumph of nature in turn would be its erosion of culture back into the primeval swamp. Zansky’s work goes beyond this dichotomy in directions pointed in the art discourse by such seminal proto-post-Modernists as Robert Smithson and Joseph Beuys. For Zansky, as for both of these artists, it is the natural resolution of civilization that it should dissolve into the swamp again, and the natural expression of the swamp that it should contain a life force always ready to sprout anew.”

Optics became an important element in Zansky's art starting with a series titled Still in Motion (2003), which was a precursor for the series The American Panopticon. Bradley Rubenstein wrote in ARCO Madrid 2005 catalog when describing Zansky's lens installation The American Panopticon: “Astolphe de Custine, writing about the late 19th century Czarist Russia, said “we are all tormented with a desire to know a world which appears to us a dungeon. I feel as if I could not depart in peace out of this narrow sphere unless I endeavored to explore my prison. The more I examine it the more beautiful and extensive it becomes in my eyes.” Peering into the void, or examining things better left unexamined is the material of Zansky's work. One is reminded of Duchamp’s Precision Optic experiments… image making machines to demonstrate the idiocy of “retinal art.” Zansky takes it a step further by creating the device, and then focusing on objects reflective of life in the 21st century. Again Duchamp reminds; the only contributions America makes to culture are her bridges and plumbing.”

In his most recent series, The Western Lands, Zansky uses digital, color photography as an end product. In contextualizing this new series, Kathleen Goncharov wrote in her essay for a solo show at Nicholas Robinson Gallery, Michael Zansky: The Western Lands, "The title of this exhibition, The Western Lands, refers to the western banks of the Nile, which in the determinist belief system of ancient Egyptian religion is the netherworld, The Land of the Dead. It is also the title of a 1987 William Burroughs' novel that explores the theme of death through a fantastic narrative, referencing Egyptian mythology, science fiction, occultism, hallucinogenic drugs magic, dreams, magic, vampires, and figures from popular culture. The bizarre confluence of characters and the utter strangeness of the novel are echoed in Zansky’s installations and photographs. Burroughs’ book and this exhibition are both counterpoints to the eternal and unchanging cosmos of the ancient Egyptian worldview. Zansky's visual universe is as uncertain and weird as the literary one Burroughs inhabits." He made paintings and wood carvings with texts by the Puerto Rican poet Giannina Braschi.

=== Exhibitions ===
Zansky's work has been shown widely at galleries and museums around the world including Barbara Gladstone Gallery, New York, NY 1978, White Columns, New York, NY 1985, 86 & 90, Albright Knox Gallery, Buffalo, NY 1986, Drawing Center, New York, NY 1988 and 2002, Calvin-Morris Gallery, New York, NY 1989, 1993, 1996, 1998 and 1999, Berry-Hill Galleries, New York, NY 1990, 1991, 1993 and 1996, Rockland Center for the Arts, West Nyack, NY 1994, 1996, 1998, 2003 and 2004, Detrusa Galerie, Madrid, Spain 1995, Hunterdon Museum, Clinton, NJ 1996, Exit Art, New York, NY 1999, 2000 and 2005, Universal Concepts Unlimited 2000 and 2002, Norton Museum of Art, West Palm Beach, FL 2001, Slought Foundation, Philadelphia, PA 2003, Nicholas Robinson Gallery, New York, NY 2003, 2006 and 2008, Galerie Lelong, New York, NY 2003, ARCO (Madrid's International Contemporary Art Fair), Madrid, Spain 2005, GAS (Gigantic Art Space), New York, NY 2005, Lab Gallery (for installation + performance art), New York, NY 2005, 2006, 2008 and 2009, Edsvik Konsthalles, Stockholm, Sweden 2006, The Aldrich Contemporary Art Museum Ridgefield, CT 2006 and 2008, SICA (Shore Institute of Contemporary Art), Long Branch, NJ 2006, Nassau County Museum of Fine Art, Roslyn Harbor, NY 2007, Kasia Kay Art Projects, Chicago, IL 2007, MONA (Museum of New Art), Detroit, MI 2007, Fieldgate Gallery, London, England 2007, Sandy Carson Gallery, Denver, CO 2007 and 2008, Corn Exchange Gallery, Edinburgh, Scotland 2008, Dorsky Gallery Curatorial Programs, Long Island City, NY 2009 and Florida Atlantic University, Boca Raton, FL 2009. He is represented by Nicholas Robinson Gallery in New York, NY.

=== Scenic artist ===
Zansky left graduate school before completing his degree to pursue two parallel career tracks, one in fine art and the other in film where he has worked as a scenic artist for such directors as Terry Gilliam, Francis Ford Coppola, Adrian Lynn, Joel Schumacher and Jonathan Demme. Zansky has had an extensive career as a scenic artist for numerous television series and films such as Law & Order: SVU, The Sopranos, Neil Young: Heart of Gold, Donnie Brasco, The First Wives Club, Godzilla, The Juror, The Fisher King and Fatal Attraction, as well as a production designer in off-Broadway theater.

== Awards ==
Zansky has been awarded a Louis Comfort Tiffany Award (1978), a Fulbright-Hayes Fellowship in Peru (1978), a C.A.P.S. Fellowship/Painting (1980), and an Emily Hall Treamaine Foundation Award for the Intelligent Design Project (2006).
