= Andrew Topolski =

Andrew Topolski (1952–2008) was an American artist and art teacher born in Buffalo, New York and later based in Brooklyn, New York.

A draftsman and sculptor, Topolski was a member of the "Hallwalls generation" in Buffalo and described his work as Intermedia, drawing on references including architecture, music, cartography, the technology of war, and other disciplines.

== Early life and education ==
Andrew Topolski was born September 21, 1952 in Buffalo, New York. He attended John F. Kennedy High School in Cheektowaga, New York and then earned undergraduate and graduate degrees in art at the University at Buffalo.

== Professional career ==
=== Buffalo, New York and Hallwalls ===
While studying at the University at Buffalo, Topolski became associated with the founders of Hallwalls--Robert Longo, Charlie Clough, Cindy Sherman, Diane Bertolo, Michael Zwack, and Nancy Dwyer. Topolski appeared in the first Hallwalls exhibition, "Spatial Survey," alongside Longo, Joe Panone, and Roger Rapp. Topolski taught art at the University at Buffalo and Villa Maria College.

=== New York City ===
Topolski left Buffalo for New York City in 1985, settling in Brooklyn, with his partner Cindy Suffoletto. He was represented by the Oscarsson Seigeltuch Gallery in SoHo and taught for many years at Parsons/The New School.

=== Callicoon ===
Following the terrorist attacks of 9/11 and the Bush Administration’s response, Topolski stopped creating any new work, in a period lasting from September 2001, when he relocated to to approximately 2003, during which time he relocated to the rural hamlet of Callicoon, New York. In 2001 the National Gallery of Art in Washington, D.C. selected Topolski's "Overground II" for inclusion in the show A Century of Drawing.

== Critical Reception and Legacy ==
Following his death in 2008, Topolski was the subject of a retrospective exhibition at the Burchfield Penney Art Center in Buffalo, New York in 2013. According to Buffalo News critic Colin Dabkowski, the exhibition featured "several bodies of work from across Topolski’s career as a prolific and gifted draftsman, sculptor and thinker – each of which blends elements of music and architecture with various modes of visual art-making."
