= Suzanne Anker =

American visual artist and theorist (born 1946)

- Born: August 6, 1946 (age 80); Brooklyn, New York
- Known for: BioArt, contemporary art, cast paper reliefs, sculpture, new media, photography, art history, art theory
- Movement: BioArt
- Website: http://www.suzanneanker.com

Suzanne Anker (born August 6, 1946) is an American visual artist and theorist. Considered a pioneer in bioart, she has been working on the relationship of art and the biological sciences for more than twenty five years. Her practice investigates the ways in which nature is being altered in the 21st century. Concerned with genetics, climate change, species extinction and toxic degradation, her work calls attention to the beauty of life and the "necessity for enlightened thinking about nature's 'tangled bank'." Anker frequently assembles with "pre-defined and found materials" botanical specimens, medical museum artifacts, laboratory apparatus, microscopic images and geological specimens.

== Biography ==
=== Life and education ===
Suzanne Anker was born in Brooklyn, New York on August 6, 1946. She earned a B.A. in Art from Brooklyn College of the City of New York and an M.F.A. from the University of Colorado in Boulder (1976). She also completed independent Studies with Ad Reinhardt (1966-1967) and studied at the Brooklyn Museum Art School (1968). She lives with the artist Frank Gillette in Manhattan and East Hampton, NY. Her choice of graduate school was determined by the fact that her first husband, Jeffrey Anker, M.D. was relieved of his duties to serve in the Vietnam War and instead work as a prison psychiatrist under the auspices of the U.S. Public Health Service. It was in Colorado that Anker was introduced to the scale of nature and its temporal aspects.

=== Paper reliefs and early sculptures ===
During the mid 70s to the mid 80s, Anker worked almost exclusively on sculptural handmade paper reliefs. She started papermaking in 1974 on the basis of reading Dard Hunter's and Claire Romano's books. In 1975 she worked with Garner Tullis at the Institute of Experimental Printmaking in Santa Cruz, California. The paper reliefs produced at his institute were exhibited at the Martha Jackson Gallery in New York City in 1976. The same year, she participated in the North American Hand Papermaking exhibition organized by Richard Minsky at the Center for Book Arts in New York City.

From a background as a printmaker, Anker initially worked with cast paper, made in latex molds. Subsequently, she incorporated limestone and fossils in her experiment with combinations of paper and stone. For her 1979 solo exhibition at the Walker Art Center, Anker installed large limestone planks that extended from the interior to the exterior of the gallery. The same year, she presented an installation of limestone and its residual chalk dust at P.S. 1's "A Great Big Drawing Show" curated by Alanna Heiss with artists Vito Acconci, Alice Aycock, Frank Gillette, Sol LeWitt, Robert Morris, Bruce Nauman, Dennis Oppenheim, Richard Serra, and others.

=== Bioart pioneer ===
Suzanne Anker is considered "one of the pioneers in the broader field of art, science, and technology", particularly in the burgeoning field of bioart. Bioart is a practice that utilizes living organisms and life processes as an artistic medium. Her work Gene Pool (1991) was featured in the 1992 article "The Consumption of Paradise" by Peggy Cyphers.

In 1994, Suzanne Anker curated Gene Culture: Molecular Metaphor in Visual Art – one of the first art exhibitions on the subject of art and genetics – at Fordham University's Lincoln Center Campus in New York. The exhibition investigated "the ways in which genetic imaging operates as aesthetic signs".

Her sculpture Cyber-chrome Chromosome from 1991 was included in the exhibition From Code to Commodity: Genetics and Visual Art at the New York Academy of Sciences in 2003.

From 2004 to 2006, Suzanne Anker hosted twenty episodes of the Bio-Blurb Show, a 30-minute-long internet radio program originally broadcast on WPS1 Art Radio, in collaboration with MoMA. The show focused on the intersection of art and the biological sciences, and the ethical and aesthetic dimensions therein. It is currently archived on Alanna Heiss' Clocktower Productions.

In 2006, Anker co-curated the exhibition Neuroculture: Visual Art and the Brain, at the Westport Arts Center with Giovanni Frazzetto. The exhibition presented an investigation of aspects of the human brain, and its attendant representations.

Suzanne Anker curated the exhibition Fundamentally human: contemporary art and neuroscience at the Pera Museum in Istanbul in 2011.

=== Academic career ===
==== School of Visual Arts (SVA NYC) ====
Suzanne Anker is the Chair of the School of Visual Arts (SVA)'s BFA Fine Arts Department in New York City (2005–present). She previously chaired the SVA BFA Art History Department (2000-2005). In 2011, Anker founded the SVA Bio Art Lab, the first Bio Art laboratory in a Fine Arts Department in the United States. The SVA Bio Art Lab is located in Chelsea, New York City and has been conceived as a place where "scientific tools and techniques become methodologies in art practice".

==== Art / Knowledge / Theory Book Series ====
Art / Knowledge / Theory is a book series that explores artistic modes of expression as forms of knowledge production. Co-edited by Suzanne Anker and Sabine Flach and published by Peter Lang since 2013, "it focuses on transdisciplinary, epistemological and methodological approaches to contemporary art. Linking artistic and scientific practices, tools, techniques, and theories, the volumes investigate the cultures of aesthetics and science studies as they relate to works of art".

Published titles include:

- Embodied Fantasies: From Awe to Artifice (2013). Suzanne Anker, Sabine Flach (eds).
- The Glass Veil: Seven Adventures in Wonderland (2015). Suzanne Anker, Sabine Flach.
- Senses of Embodiment: Arts, Technics, Media (2014). Mika Elo, Miika Luoto (eds).
- Naturally Hypernatural I: Concepts of Nature (2016). Suzanne Anker, Sabine Flach (eds).
- Naturally Hypernatural III: Hypernatural Landscapes in the Anthropocene (2016). Sabine Flach, Gary Sherman (eds).
- Axis of Observation I: Frank Gillette (2018). Suzanne Anker, Sabine Flach (eds).

==== Notable authored publications ====
===== The Molecular Gaze: Art in the Genetic Age =====
Anker co-authored The Molecular Gaze: Art in the Genetic Age with the American sociologist of science Dorothy Nelkin. The publication examines the intersections between art and science in the developing arena of genetic research and engineering, focusing on the ethical and social issues that the genetic revolution poses on popular culture and visual arts. It was published in 2004 by Cold Spring Harbor Laboratory Press (associated with Cold Spring Harbor Laboratory where James Watson –the co-discoverer of DNA– was director).

===== Visual Culture and Bioscience: Issues in Cultural Theory =====
In 2008 Suzanne Anker co-edited with JD Talasek Visual Culture and Bioscience: Issues in Cultural Theory, No. 12, a publication organized by the Center for Art, Design and Visual Culture, University of Maryland Baltimore County and Cultural Programs of the National Academy of Sciences, Washington DC. The book is an exploration of the relationships between bio-sciences and art, and translates the remarks of participants in an online symposium centered on the "current dialogue surrounding the relationship between the science lab and the art studio". (Panelists: Carl Djerassi of Stanford University, Troy Duster of NYU, Marvin Heiferman of SVA, David Freedberg of Columbia University, artists Oron Catts and Catherine Chalmers, Art in America Senior Editor Nancy Princenthal, writer Andrew Solomon and others.)

===== Handbook of Genetics and Society =====
Anker authored the chapter "Cultural imaginaries and laboratories of the real: Representing the genetic sciences" in The Handbook of Genetics & Society: Mapping the New Genomic Era, published in 2009 by Routledge. Her essay is focused on the pictorial practices employed by both artists and scientists to produce knowledge.

===== Social Text: Interspecies =====
In 2011 Anker contributed to Interspecies, Social Text issue 106 (Volume 29, Number 1, Spring 2011), published by Duke University Press. The journal includes an interview by feminist science studies scholar and anthropologist Sarah Franklin and Suzanne Anker, in an exchange that addresses the "visual culture of specimen display and its significance in both art and social theory, considering the role of bio-art in the production of the specimen as spectacle".

===== Bio Art: Altered Realities =====
Suzanne Anker wrote the foreword to the book Bio Art: Altered Realities, authored by William Myers in 2015. The publication explores the work of bio artists, "those who work with living organisms and life processes to address the possibilities and dangers posed by biotechnological advancement".

==== Lectures and Symposia ====
Anker has participated in lectures and symposia in prominent institutions around the world, including Harvard University, Boston; University of Cambridge, Cambridge, UK; Yale University, New Haven; Art-Sci UCLA, Los Angeles; Maryland Institute College of Art (MICA), Baltimore; Rensselaer Polytechnic Institute, New York; Museum of Arts and Design, New York; Nanyang Technological University, Singapore; London School of Economics, London; European Molecular Biology Laboratory- EMBL, Monterotondo, Italy; Max Planck Institute of Molecular Cell Biology and Genetics, Dresden; Leiden University, NL; Hamburger Bahnhof, Berlin; Dundee Contemporary Arts, Dundee; Courtauld Institute of Art, London; Banff Art Center, Alberta; The National Academies of Sciences, Engineering, and Medicine, Washington, D.C.; Berlin-Brandenburg Academy of Sciences and Humanities, Berlin; University of Amsterdam, NL; New York Academy of Sciences, Institute for the Humanities, New York University; DLD, Munich.

== Selected artworks ==
=== Gene Pool ===
Anker's interests in the natural world extended her investigation into the microscopic domain of chromosomes and genes. Appropriating scientific images, she created Gene Pool in 1991, a body of work that includes suspended pigment on large vellum sheets and expansive sculptural arrays employing metallic fibers of stainless steel, copper, aluminum and bronze.

=== Zoosemiotics ===
Zoosemiotics: Primates, Frog, Gazelle, Fish (1993) is a sculptural installation by Suzanne Anker. The work was first displayed in 1993 at The Hanes Art Center, University of North Carolina at Chapel Hill. It was later featured in the Devices of Wonder exhibition at The J. Paul Getty Museum, Los Angeles (2001-2002). The installation work is emblematic of the interaction of art and science and "conjures up the alchemist's medieval laboratory and its mottled crystal ball". It features a large glass vessel filled with water and an installation of sculptural forms reminiscent of chromosomal pairs from fish, frogs, gazelles and primates (gorilla, chimpanzee and orangutan), emulating the laboratory technician's charts of the subtle genetic differences between species. Zoosemiotics was included in Paradise Now: Picturing the Genetic Revolution curated by Marvin Heiferman and Carole Kismaric, originating at Exit Art, New York, September 2000 and touring to museums nationally through March 2004.

Other works that reflect scientific representations of chromosomes include Chromosome Chart of Suzanne Anker –a presentation of her own DNA sequence as a self-portrait– and Cellular Script, in which she displays chromosome patterns as a kind of calligraphy. Similarly, the installation Codex.X.Genome presents magnified images of chromosomes that resemble ancient writing.

=== Biota ===
Biota (2011) is a sculptural installation by Suzanne Anker composed of porcelain sculptures and silver-leaf figurines. The porcelain objects are fabricated by immersing natural sea sponges into a mixture of kaolin, feldspar, and quartz. "The organic material of the sponge burns away in the process, leaving behind only the perfect replica of nature".

=== Collision of the Diamond Mind ===
Collision of the Diamond Mind (2013) is an installation work employing metallic-glazed porcelain forms created from tube sponges. Visually referencing meteorites, the project "points to how little we know about outer space and the imaginary dreams that may be located there. This piece also invokes aspects of chance and flux and how such collisions are beyond our control".

The artist explains that this artwork "is actually an extension of an earlier piece entitled Diamond-Cutters, an installation from 1978. The latter installation employed limestone, handmade paper, plaster, chalk and broken glass. All of the pieces were white, some of the stones were cut, while others had the residue of dynamite marks left from the stone's extraction from its quarry. The theme of diamond mind is an invocation of clarity and centeredness held by Buddhist philosophers. As a path towards a more enlightened being, the experience of art-making converts energy into form".

=== Origins and Futures ===
Origins and Futures (2005) takes the form of a sculptural installation of rapid prototype sculpture which counterbalance pyrite minerals and images of embryos built by 3D computer software. Anker's sculpture is based "on the theories of A.G. Cairns-Smith's proposal, that life on earth originated through the "genetic takeover" of crystals which allowed RNA to learn life's replication process". The work unveils "the bio-ethical issues that emerge with regard to the manipulation and commercialization of living forms".

=== The Glass Veil, Water Babies and Sons and Daughters ===
The Glass Veil (2004-2009) is a series of photographs taken by Suzanne Anker in the collections of several medical museums, including the Museum Vrolik in Amsterdam, the Medical Museion in Copenhagen, and the Medizinhistorisches Museum der Charité in Berlin. These images bring forth somatic reactions in viewers as they are confronted in each case with human remains. They "point to myriad cultural questions concerning consent, disease, social mores, laboratory practices and, of course, mortality".

=== The Butterfly in the Brain / Rorschach ===
The Butterfly in the Brain refers to MRI brain scans and Rorschach tests as devices explicating brain morphology and psychologically driven projective techniques. In this body of work, Anker makes use of a variety of mediums such as screen printing, sculpture, video and installation. By superimposing images of butterflies on MRI brain scans, the artist explores the ways in which human perception relies on figure/ground relationships. Her Rorschach series (2004-2005) also utilizes scientific imagery as source material. In this body of work, the artist employs computer-generated 3D modeling and printing processes to produce symmetrical sculptures that resemble the tests created by Swiss psychologist Hermann Rorschach.

=== Laboratory Life ===
Laboratory Life (2005-2007) is an artwork composed of photographs of scientific apparatuses overlaid with images of nature, man-made gardens, and wild floral outcrops. To produce this work, Anker visited various scientific laboratories, such as the Imperial Blast Biomechanics & Biophysics Laboratory at Imperial College in London, the European Molecular Biological Laboratory (EMBL) in Rome and the Max Planck Institutes in Dresden.

Regarding this project the artist explains, "both laboratories and gardens are artificially created. They are constructed spaces, framed with either pastoral delight in mind, or as a site where nature is scrutinized, expecting to surrender its secrets. [...] These open and closed practices, being in the nature/culture nexus, represent current osmotic flow as each side inches towards the other's domain. As nature becomes "culturized", that is, manipulated and transformed, culture absorbs and expands upon these changes. [...] What gardens do in fact have in common with laboratories is the everyday care needed to sustain life. Nature is in continual flux, repositioning its elements constantly".

The work was featured in the exhibition GLOBALE: Exo-Evolution (2015-2016), curated by Peter Weibel, Sabiha Keyif, Philipp Ziegler and Giulia Bini at ZKM | Center for Art and Media Karlsruhe, Germany.

=== Astroculture ===
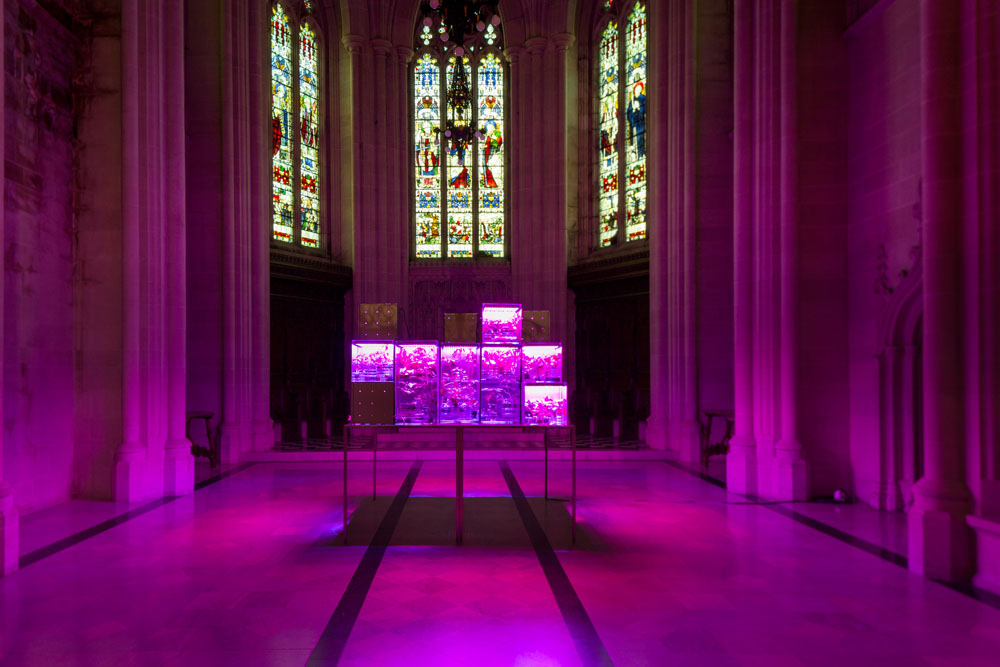
Suzanne Anker: Astroculture (Eternal Return), 2015. Vegetable producing plants grown from seed using LED lights. Galvanized steel cubes, plastic, red and blue LED lights, plants, water, soil and no pesticides. 42 x 14 x 14 in (106.65 x 35.65 x 35.65 cm) each set. Installation view at "The Value of Food", 2015. The Cathedral Church of Saint John the Divine, NYC.

Using live plants under controlled lighting sources, Anker's plants displayed in Astroculture (2009- on going) are grown from seed without using pesticides. Each seed is planted in a small peat pod and sprouts within a few days. The title of the work refers to a term employed by NASA apropos of their development of growing plants in space. An iteration from this series entitled Astroculture (Eternal Return) was prominently featured in the solo exhibition 1.5 °Celsius at the Everson Museum of Art, Syracuse, New York in 2019, as well as in the 2015 exhibition The Value of Food: Sustaining a Green Planet, installed at Cathedral of St. John the Divine in New York City.

=== Vanitas (in a Petri dish) ===
The body of work Vanitas (in a Petri Dish) (2013- on going) employs the Petri dish as a cultural icon. The work is based on photographs of natural and artificial elements that the artist arranges inside Petri dishes, referencing the tradition of the Vanitas as symbolic work of art. Relating current discourses into the manipulation of matter to concerns in 17th and 18th century Western paintings, the project brings to the fore ethical arguments concerning biotech practices in the 21st century.

=== Remote Sensing ===
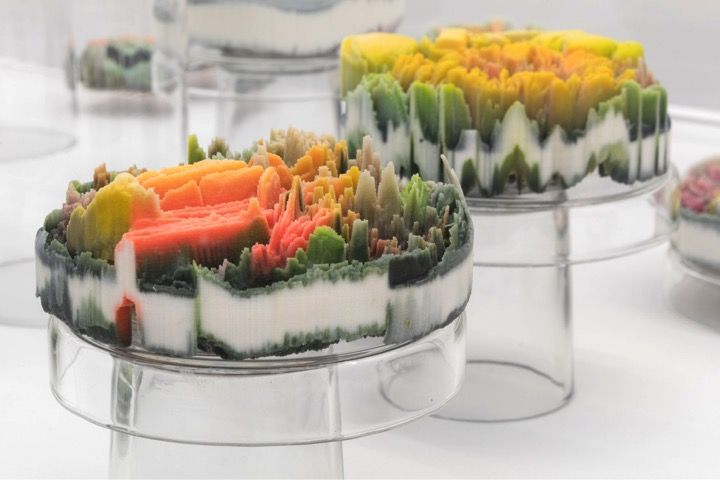
Suzanne Anker: Remote Sensing, 2016 Installation view from "Artists Choose Artists", Parrish Art Museum, Watermill, NY

Remote Sensing (2014- on going) is a series of rapid prototype sculptures appearing as micro-landscapes. Produced with a 3D printer employing pigmented plaster and resin, the work takes its cue from the disastrous impacts of toxicity and war. The title of the project "Remote sensing" originated from a term used in satellite technology to describe computer-generated data used to assess geographical areas that are too problematic or dangerous for human intervention.

Anker explains that "the fabrication of the work in the series Remote Sensing begins with digital photographs in the Vanitas (in a Petri Dish) series. These high-resolution images are reprocessed through computer programs converting the photographs' color arrays into 3D protrusions, a technique called displacement mapping. [...] The resulting objects take on new meanings as a still life is transformed into a micro-landscape, ironically, another genre in art historical dialogue. Hence these simulations provide tools for the expansion of pictorial configurations in both science and art".

=== Rainbow Loom (Germany, China, USA, Korea) ===
Rainbow Loom is a series of arrangements of organic and inorganic objects in Petri dishes. Anker uses local grocery items and manufactured products, as a way to understand specific cultures in the global economy.

Employing many Petri dishes, Anker arranges the natural and artificial objects by color, from red to yellow to green to blue to violet.

The Petri dish, like a Rorschach inkblot, or DNA's double helix, has become a popular cultural icon. While denotatively, the Petri dish is a covered glass plate used in scientific laboratories, connotatively, it alludes to something brewing under investigation. In this real or imagined container a concept or a substance, if allowed to ferment, will sprout its hidden dimensions. From seeds, to politics, to toxic environments inside, such a dish brings forth a host of arresting results.

== Exhibitions ==
=== Selected one-person exhibitions ===
- "1.5 °Celsius", Everson Museum of Art. Syracuse, NY. Curated by DJ Hellerman and David Ross. (2019).
- "The Biosphere Blues Mending an Unhinged Earth", O'NewWall, Seoul, Korea (2017).
- "Blue Eggs and Spam", Kinetic Gallery at SUNY Geneseo, NY (2016).
- "Vanitas (in a Petri dish)". New York Hall of Science, Queens, NY (2016).
- "Culturing Life", Sam Francis Gallery, Crossroads School for Art and Sciences, Santa Monica, CA (2015).
- "Rainbow Loom", V Art center & SNAP, Shanghai, China (2014).
- "While Darkness Sleeps", The McKinney Avenue Contemporary (The MAC), Dallas, TX (2014).
- "Remote Sensing: Micro-landscapes and Untold Stories". Fotofest Biennale, Deborah Colton Gallery, Houston, TX (2014).
- "Genetic Seed Bank", Art | Sci Gallery, UCLA California Nanosystems Institute (2012)
- "The Glass Veil." Berlin Museum of Medical History at the Charité, Berlin, Germany (2009).
- "The Hothouse Archives." ICI Berlin Institute for Cultural Inquiry, Germany (2009).
- "Bio-Blurbs: Digital Photography 2004-2007." Deborah Colton Gallery, Houston, Texas in conjunction with FotoFest (2008).
- "MicroNatural" (installation) in Human Nature. SoFA Gallery Bloomington, Indiana (2007).
- "Human Nature II: Future Worlds." Indiana University's SoFA Gallery, Bloomington, IN (2007).
- "FutureNatural." Deborah Colton Gallery, Houston, TX (2005).
- "The Genetic Gaze." University of Colorado Museum, Boulder, CO (2005).
- "Golden Boy." Universal Concepts Unlimited, NYC (2004).
- "Origins and Futures." Hamilton College, NY (2004).
- "The Butterfly in the Brain." Universal Concepts Unlimited, NYC (2002).
- "Geneculture." Else Gallery, Cal State University, Sacramento, CA (2001).
- "Gen XX/GenXY." Rosenberg Gallery, Hofstra University, NY (2001).
- "Code.X:genome." Universal Concepts Unlimited, NYC (2000).
- "Zoosemiotics." Hanes Art Center, University of North Carolina at Chapel Hill (1993).
- "Errata/Erotica." B 4 A Gallery, NYC (1992).
- Greenberg Wilson Gallery, NYC (1990).
- Andrea Ruggieri Gallery, Washington D.C (1990).
- Attitude Art, NYC (1990).
- Andrea Ruggieri Gallery, Washington, D.C (1989).
- Greenberg Wilson Gallery, NYC (1988).
- Andrea Ruggieri Gallery, Washington, D.C (1988).
- Rastovski Gallery, NYC (1987).
- Galleria Arte Verso, Genoa, Italy (1982).
- "Echo-Tracers." Galleria Milano, Milan, Italy (1980).
- Minneapolis College of Art and Design, Minneapolis, MN (1980).
- Sebastian-Moore Gallery, Denver, CO (1980).
- Richard Gray Gallery, Chicago, IL (1979).
- Walker Art Center, Minneapolis, MN (1979).
- "Diamond-Cutters." Terry Moore Gallery, St. Louis, MO (1978).

=== Group exhibitions ===
Anker's work has been shown both nationally and internationally in museums and galleries including the Chronus Art Center, Shanghai, China (2019); Daejeon Biennale, Daejeon Korea (2018); Children's Museum of Art, New York (2017); Parrish Art Museum, Southampton, New York (2016); ZKM Center for Art and Media, Karlsruhe, Germany (2015); Beall Center for Art + Technology, Irvine, California, USA (2015); Today Art Museum, Beijing, China (2015); the International Biennial of Contemporary Art of Cartagena de Indias, Colombia (2014); Exit Art (2012, 2008), New York, USA; Walker Art Center, Minnesota, USA; Smithsonian Institution, Washington, D.C., USA; The Phillips Collection, Washington, D.C., USA; P.S.1 Contemporary Art Center, New York, USA; The J. Paul Getty Museum, California, USA; Center for Cultural Inquiry in Berlin, and Pera Museum, Istanbul, Turkey (2009) among many others.

== Exhibition catalogs ==
- Anker, Suzanne; Akkoyunlu, Begüm; Bahar, Tania; Pera Müzesi (2011-01-01). Temelde İnsan: çaǧdaş sanat ve nörobilim = Fundamentally human : contemporary art and neuroscience. Tepebașı, İstanbul: Pera Müzesi. ISBN 9789759123857.
- Anker, Suzanne; Deborah Colton Gallery; McKinney Avenue Contemporary (Gallery) (2014). The greening of the galaxy. Houston, Tx.: Deborah Colton Gallery. ISBN 9780991662708.
- Buchhart, Dieter (2014). The nature of disappearance. New York: Marianne Boesky Gallery. p. 93. ISBN 9780988275225.
- Dehò, Valerio; Kunst Meran (2002-01-01). DNArt: Eurovision Ia Biennale Merano arte - DNArt = DNArt : Eurovision I. Biennale Kunst Meran - DNArt (in German). Milano: De Agostini Rizzoli Arte et Cultura. ISBN 8873170951.
- Eimert, Dorothea; Leopold-Hoesch-Museum der Stadt Düren, eds. (1986-01-01). 1. Internationale Biennale der Papierkunst: 'Handgeschöpftes' = 1. International Biennal of Paper Art : Hand made paper : 25.5. - 17.8.1986 (in German). Düren: Leopold-Hoesch-Museum. ISBN 3925955003.
- Farmer, Jane M; World Print Council; Sarah Campbell Blaffer Gallery (1982-01-01). New American paperworks. San Francisco, Calif.: The Council. ISBN 0960249613.
- Farmer, Jane M; Kraft, Barbara S; Smithsonian Institution; Traveling Exhibition Service (1978-01-01). Paper as medium. Washington: The Service.
- Heiferman, Marvin; Kismaric, Carole; Berry, Ian; Frances Young Tang Teaching Museum and Art Gallery (2001-01-01). Picturing the genetic revolution now. Saratoga Springs, NY; New York, NY: Tang Museum, Skidmore College. ISBN 0970879024.
- Impact International Printmaking Conference; Harrison, Paul Liam; Shemilt, Emile; Watson, Arthur; Duncan of Jordanstone College of Art and Design, eds. (2014-01-01). Impact 8: Borders & crossings : the artist as explorer. ISBN 9781899837700.
- Kotik, Charlotta; Albright-Knox Art Gallery (1980-01-01). With paper, about paper. Buffalo, N.Y.: Albright-Knox Art Gallery. ISBN 0914782355.
- Moura, Leonel (2009). INSIDE [art and science], Lisbon: LxXL. pp. 84–91. ISBN 9789728615079.
- Scala, Mark; Anker, Suzanne; Frist Center for the Visual Arts (Nashville, Tenn.); Winnipeg Art Gallery; Glenbow Museum (2012-01-01). Fairy tales, monsters, and the genetic imagination. Nashville, Tenn.: Frist Center for the Visual Arts, Vanderbilt University Press. ISBN 9780826518149.
