= Dictator novel =

Latin American literary genre

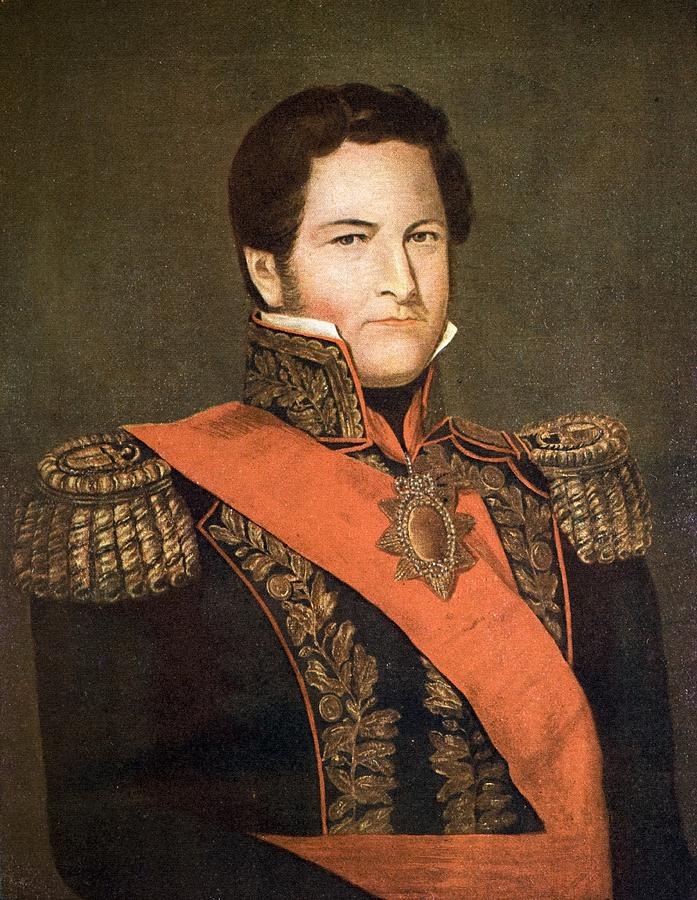
Juan Manuel de Rosas, 19th-century Argentine dictator, by Cayetano Descalzi.

The dictator novel (Spanish: novela del dictador) is a genre of Latin American literature that challenges the role of the dictator in Latin American society. The theme of caudillismo—the régime of a charismatic caudillo, a political strongman—is addressed by examining the relationships between power, dictatorship, and writing. Moreover, a dictator novel often is an allegory for the role of the writer in a Latin American society. Although mostly associated with the Latin American Boom of the 1960s and 1970s, the dictator-novel genre has its roots in the nineteenth-century non-fiction work Facundo (1845) by Domingo Faustino Sarmiento.

As an indirect critique of Juan Manuel de Rosas' dictatorial régime in Argentina, Facundo is the forerunner of the dictator novel genre; all subsequent dictator novels harken back to it. As established by Sarmiento, the goal of the genre is not to analyze the rule of particular dictators, or to focus on historical accuracy, but to examine the abstract nature of authority figures and of authority in general.

To be considered a dictator novel, a story should have strong political themes drawn from history, a critical examination of the power held by the dictator, the caudillo, and some general reflection on the nature of authoritarianism. Although some dictator novels centre on one historical dictator (albeit in fictional guise), they do not analyze the economics, politics, and rule of the régime as might a history book. The dictator novel genre includes I, the Supreme (1974), by Augusto Roa Bastos, about Dr. Francia of Paraguay, and The Feast of the Goat (2000), by Mario Vargas Llosa, about Rafael Leónidas Trujillo of the Dominican Republic. Alternatively, the novelist might create a fictional dictator to achieve the same narrative end, as in Reasons of State (1974), by Alejo Carpentier, in which the dictator is a composite man assembled from historical dictators.

The genre of the dictator novel has been very influential in the development of a Latin American literary tradition, because many of the novelists rejected traditional, linear story-telling techniques, and developed narrative styles that blurred the distinctions between reader, narrator, plot, characters, and story. In examining the authority of leadership, the novelists also assessed their own social roles as paternalistic dispensers of wisdom, like that of the caudillo whose régime they challenged in their dictator novels.

== Literary context ==
Literary critic Roberto González Echevarría argues that the dictator novel is "the most clearly indigenous thematic tradition in Latin American literature" and traces the development of this theme from "as far back as Bernal Díaz del Castillo's and Francisco López de Gómara's accounts of Cortés's conquest of Mexico". The nineteenth century saw significant literary reflections on political power, though on the whole the dictator novel is associated with the Latin American Boom, a literary movement of the 1960s and 1970s. For critic Gerald Martin, the dictator novel marks the end of the Boom and even (as he says of Roa Bastos's I, the Supreme) "the end of an entire era in Latin American history, the era which had stretched from Sarmiento's Facundo in 1845". In the 1970s, many dictator novels focused on the figure "of the aging dictator, prey to the boredom of a limitless power he is on the verge of losing".

== Definition ==
Miguel Ángel Asturias's El Señor Presidente (written in 1933, but not published until 1946) is, in the opinion of critic Gerald Martin, "the first real dictator novel". Other literary treatments of the dictator figure followed, such as Jorge Zalamea's El Gran Burundún Burundá ha muerto, but the genre did not gain impetus until it was reinvented in the political climate of the Cold War, through the Latin American Boom.

The dictator novel came back into fashion in the 1970s, towards the end of the Boom. As Sharon Keefe Ugalde remarks, "the 1970s mark a new stage in the evolution of the Latin American dictator novel, characterized by at least two developments: a change in the perspective from which the dictator is viewed and a new focus on the nature of language". By this she means that the dictator novels of the 1970s, such as The Autumn of the Patriarch or I, the Supreme, offer the reader a more intimate view of their subject: "the dictator becomes protagonist" and the world is often seen from his point of view. With the new focus on language, Keefe Ugalde points to the realisation on the part of many authors that "the tyrant's power is derived from and defeated by language". For example, in Jorge Zalamea's El Gran Burundún Burundá ha muerto the dictator bans all forms of language.

According to Raymond L. Williams, it was not until the 1970s, when enough Latin American writers had published novels dealing with military regimes, that "dictator novel" became common nomenclature. The most celebrated novels of this era were Alejo Carpentier's Reasons of State (1974), Augusto Roa Bastos's I, the Supreme (1974), and Gabriel García Marquez's The Autumn of the Patriarch (1975). He defines the dictator novel as a novel which draws upon the historical record to create fictionalized versions of dictators. In this way, the author is able to use the specific to explain the general, as many dictator novels are centred around the rule of one particular dictator. Within this group he includes those novelists who took to task authoritarian figures such as Vargas Llosa's Conversation in the Cathedral (1969) and Denzil Romero's La tragedia del Generalísimo (1984). He even includes Sergio Ramírez's ¿Te dio miedo la sangre? (1977), a novel about Nicaraguan society under the Somoza dictatorship, which has been described as a "dictator novel without the dictator".

== Style and theme ==
The novelists of the dictator novel genre combined narrative strategies of both modern and postmodern writing. Postmodern techniques, constructed largely in the late 1960s and 1970s, included use of interior monologues, radically stream-of-consciousness narrative, fragmentation, varying narrative points of view, neologisms, innovative narrative strategies, and frequent lack of causality. Alejo Carpentier, a Boom writer and contributor to the dictator novel genre pioneered what came to be known as magical realism, although the use of this technique is not necessarily a prerequisite of the dictator novel, as there are many that do not utilize magical realism.

A predominant theme of the dictator novel is power, which according literary critic Michael Valdez Moses, in his 2002 review of Feast of the Goat, is linked to the theme of dictatorship: "The enduring power of the Latin American dictator novel had everything to do with the enduring power of Latin American dictators". As novels such as El Señor Presidente became more well-known, they were read as ambitious political statements, denouncing the authority of dictators in Latin America. As political statements, dictator novel authors challenged dictatorial power, creating a link between power and writing through the force wielded by their pen. For example, in Roa Bastos's I, the Supreme, the novel revolves around a central theme of language and the power inherent in all of its forms, a power that is often only present in the deconstruction of communication. González Echevarría argues that:

Dr. Francia's fear of the pasquinade, his abuse of Policarpo Patiño ..., [and] his constant worry about writing all stem from the fact that he has found and used the power implicit in language itself. The Supremo defines power as being able to do through others what we are unable to do ourselves: language, being separate from what it designates, is the very embodiment of power, for things act and mean through it without ceasing to be themselves. Dr. Francia has also realized that he cannot control language, particularly written language, that it has a life of its own that threatens him.

Another constant theme which runs throughout the Latin American dictator novel, which gained in importance and frequency during the Latin American Boom, is the interdependence of the Latin American tyrant and United States imperialism. In Mario Vargas Llosa's The Feast of the Goat, for example, Trujillo faces serious opposition shortly after losing his material backing from the CIA, previously held for over 32 years in light of his anti-communist leanings.

Gender is an additional overarching theme within dictator novels. National portraits in Latin America often insist on the importance of women (and men) that are healthy, happy, productive, and patriotic, yet many national literary treasures often reflect government rhetoric in the way they code active citizenship as male. Masculinity is an enduring motif in the dictator novel. There is a connection between the pen and the penis in Latin American fiction, but this pattern cannot be explained by machismo alone—it is far more complex. According to Rebecca E. Biron, "where we find violent, misogynistic fantasies of masculinity, we also [find] violent social relations between actual men and women". Many Latin American works "include characters who act out violent fictions of masculinity, and yet their narrative structure provides readers with alternative responses to misogynistic fantasies of masculine identity formation".

== Historical context ==
=== Dictators in Latin American history ===
Since independence, Latin American countries have been subject to both right and left-wing authoritarian regimes. Given this long history, it is unsurprising that there have been so many novels "about individual dictators, or about the problems of dictatorship caudillismo, caciquismo, militarism and the like". The legacy of colonialism is one of racial conflict sometimes pushing an absolute authority to rise up to contain it—thus the tyrant is born. Seeking unlimited power, dictators often amend constitutions, dismantling laws which prevent their reelection. Licenciado Manuel Estrada Cabrera, for example, altered the Guatemalan Constitution in 1899 to permit his return to power. The dictators who have become the focus of the dictator novel (Augusto Roa Bastos's I, the Supreme, for instance, is based on Paraguay's dictator of the early nineteenth century, the so-called Dr Francia) do not differ much from each other in terms of how they govern. As author González Echevarría states: "they are male, militaristic, and wield almost absolute personal power".

Their strong-arm tactics include exiling or imprisoning their opposition, attacking the freedom of the press, creating a centralized government backed by a powerful military force, and assuming complete control over free thought. Despite intense criticisms leveled at these figures, dictators involved in nationalist movements developed three simple truths, "that everybody belonged, that the benefits of Progress should be shared, and that industrial development should be the priority". Epitácio Pessoa, who was elected President of Brazil in 1919, wanted to make the country progress regardless of whether or not Congress passed the laws he proposed. In particular, during the Great Depression, Latin American activist governments of the 1930s saw the end of neocolonialism and the infusion of nationalist movements throughout Latin America, increasing the success of import substitution industrialization or ISI. The positive side-effect of the collapse of international trade meant local Latin American manufacturers could fill the market niches left vacant by vanishing exports.

In the twentieth century, prominent Latin American dictators have included the Somoza dynasty in Nicaragua, Alfredo Stroessner in Paraguay, and Augusto Pinochet in Chile, among others. As an outside influence, United States interference in Latin American politics is controversial and has often been severely criticized. As García Calderon noted as far back as 1925: "Does it want peace or is it controlled by certain interests?" As a theme in the dictator novel, the link between U.S. imperialism and the power of the tyrant is very important. Dictators in Latin America have accepted military and financial support from the United States when it suited them, but have also turned against the United States, using anti-American campaigning to gain favour with the people. In the case of Trujillo, "Nothing promises to reinvigorate his flagging popularity more than to face up to the Yankee aggressor in the name of la patria."

In the first decade of the 21st century, the pendulum swung in the other direction, introducing a series of 'left wing' governments to the region that curtailed civil liberties and set up their own messy version of popular dictatorships through a process that has been called "competitive authoritarianism". The most well-known of these was President Hugo Chávez of Venezuela, and came to include other countries in his Bolivarian Alliance of the Americas (Cuba, Nicaragua, Bolivia, Ecuador, Honduras—and in some ways Argentina, though it was not an official member) in what was called the Pink tide.

=== Los Padres de la Patria ===
In 1967 during a meeting with Alejo Carpentier, Julio Cortázar, and Miguel Otero Silva, the Mexican author Carlos Fuentes launched a project consisting of a series of biographies depicting Latin American dictators, which was to be called Los Padres de la Patria (The Fathers of the Fatherland). After reading Edmund Wilson's portraits of the American Civil War in Patriotic Gore, Fuentes recounts: "Sitting in a pub in Hampstead, we thought it would be a good idea to have a comparable book on Latin America. An imaginary portrait gallery immediately stepped forward, demanding incarnation: the Latin American dictators." Vargas Llosa was to write about Manuel A. Odría, Jorge Edwards about José Manuel Balmaceda, José Donoso about Mariano Melgarejo, and Julio Cortázar about Eva Perón. As M. Mar Langa Pizarro observes, the project was never completed, but it helped inspire a series of novels written by important authors during the Latin American literary boom, such as Alejo Carpentier, Augusto Roa Bastos, Gabriel García Márquez, and Mario Vargas Llosa.

== Development of the genre ==
=== Forerunners ===
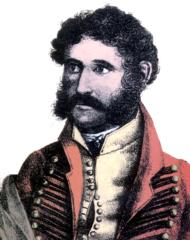
The caudillo Juan Facundo Quiroga

Both Domingo Faustino Sarmiento's Facundo and José Marmol's Amalia, published in the nineteenth century, were precursors to the twentieth century dictator novel; however, "all fictional depictions of the Latin American 'strong-man', have an important antecedent in Domingo Faustino Sarmiento's Facundo, a work written as a sociolodical treatise". Facundo is an indirect critique of Juan Manuel de Rosas' dictatorship, directed against the actual historical figure, Juan Facundo Quiroga – but is also a broader investigation into Argentine history and culture. Sarmiento's Facundo has remained a fundamental fixture because of the breadth of its literary exploration of the Latin American environment.

In Facundo, Sarmiento criticizes the historical figure Facundo Quiroga, a provincial caudillo, who like Rosas (dictator of Argentina from 1829 to 1853) was opposed to the enlightened ideas of progress. After returning from exile, Sarmiento worked to reinvent Argentina, eventually becoming president himself from 1868 to 1874. Sarmiento's analysis of Facundo Quiroga was the first time that an author questioned how figures like Facundo and Rosas could have maintained such absolute power, and in answering this question, Facundo established its place as an inspirational text to later authors. Sarmiento perceived his own power in writing Facundo as "within the text of the novel, it is the novelist, through the voice of omniscience, who has replaced God", thereby creating the bridge between writing and power that is characteristic of the dictator novel.

Set in post-colonial Buenos Aires, Amalia was written in two parts and is a semi-autobiographical account of José Mármol that deals with living in Rosas's police state. Mármol's novel was important as it showed how the human consciousness, much like a city or even a country, could become a terrifying prison. Amalia also attempted to examine the problem of dictatorships as being one of structure, and therefore the problem of the state "manifested through the will of some monstrous personage violating the ordinary individual's privacy, both of home and of consciousness". In the early twentieth century, the Spaniard Ramón del Valle-Inclán's Tirano Banderas (1926) acted as a key influence on those authors whose goal was to critique power structures and the status quo.

=== Classic dictator novels ===
- Martín Luis Guzmán, The Shadow of the Strongman (La sombra del Caudillo, 1929) is the first Mexican novel after the Revolution in the country explicitly concentrated on the figure and the omnipresence of the caudillo as a dictator with powerful military surrounding and background. Here the portrayed dictator is Alvaro Obregon. The novel had positive reception by the readers and the critics and was praised by the Mexican intelligentsia. It was initially published in Spain and was temporary banned in Mexico mainly because it was inspired by real events with identifiable leading political figures. The plot concentrates on affairs surrounding the 1927 presidential elections campaign and the massacre at Huitzilac. The writer demonstrates laconicism and attention to details as characteristics of his style.
- El Señor Presidente is a 1946 novel by Guatemalan Nobel Prize-winning writer and diplomat Miguel Ángel Asturias. Although the novel does not explicitly identify its setting as early twentieth-century Guatemala, Asturias was inspired by the 1898–1920 presidency of Manuel Estrada Cabrera for his title character. This novel explores the nature of political dictatorship and its effects on society, and is an overtly political novel in which Asturias denounces Latin American dictators. By keeping time and place ambiguous, Asturias's novel represents a break from former narratives, which until this point had been judged on how adequately they reflected reality. Asturias's distinctive use of dream imagery, onomatopoeia, simile, and repetition, combined with a discontinuous structure consisting of abrupt changes of style and viewpoint, sprang from surrealist and ultraist influences. Furthermore, it made early use of a literary technique that would come to be known as magic realism. The President went on to influence a generation of Latin American authors, becoming an early example of the "new novel" and a precursor to the Latin American literary boom.
- Jorge Zalamea, El gran Burundún Burundá ha Muerto ("The Great Burundún Burundá is Dead", 1951). For Keefe Ugalde, "El gran Burundún Burundá ... occupies an important midway point in the evolution of the dictator novel" and Peter Neissa emphasizes "its cultural and political importance and subsequent influence on dictator narratives". More broadly, Martin describes this "remarkable Colombian novelette" as seeming to contain "the seeds of García Márquez's mature style". The book describes the (fictional) dictator "Burundún's rise to power, selected events during his regime, and a description of his funeral." It is at this funeral that it is revealed that the body of the dictator is absent, and has somehow been replaced by or transformed into "a great big parrot, a voluminous parrot, an enormous parrot, all swollen, inflated and wrapped in documents, gazettes, mail from abroad, newspapers, reports, annals, broadsheets, almanacs, official bulletins".
- Enrique Lafourcade's King Ahab's Feast (La Fiesta del rey Acab, 1959) portrays the fictional dictator César Alejandro Carrillo Acab, and opens with what Claude Hulet describes as an "amusingly ironic, tongue-in-cheek note in preface" which declares that "This is a mere work of fiction. ... Indeed, no one is unaware that neither the United Nations, nor the Organization of American States, permits the continued existence of regimes like the one that serves as pretext to this novel." As Hulet observes, Lafourcade's "powerful and razor sharp satire" is directed "presumably against the Trujillo regime and others like it".
- Alejo Carpentier's, Reasons of State (El recurso del método, 1974), is a synthesis of several historical figures from Latin American, most prominently Gerardo Machado, dictator of Cuba. This fictional character, in his bid to be refined, spends half of his life in Europe, perhaps reminiscent of Sarmiento's dichotomy of civilization and barbarism. This novel is tragicomic in nature, the only novel by Carpentier to combine elements of both tragedy and comedy.
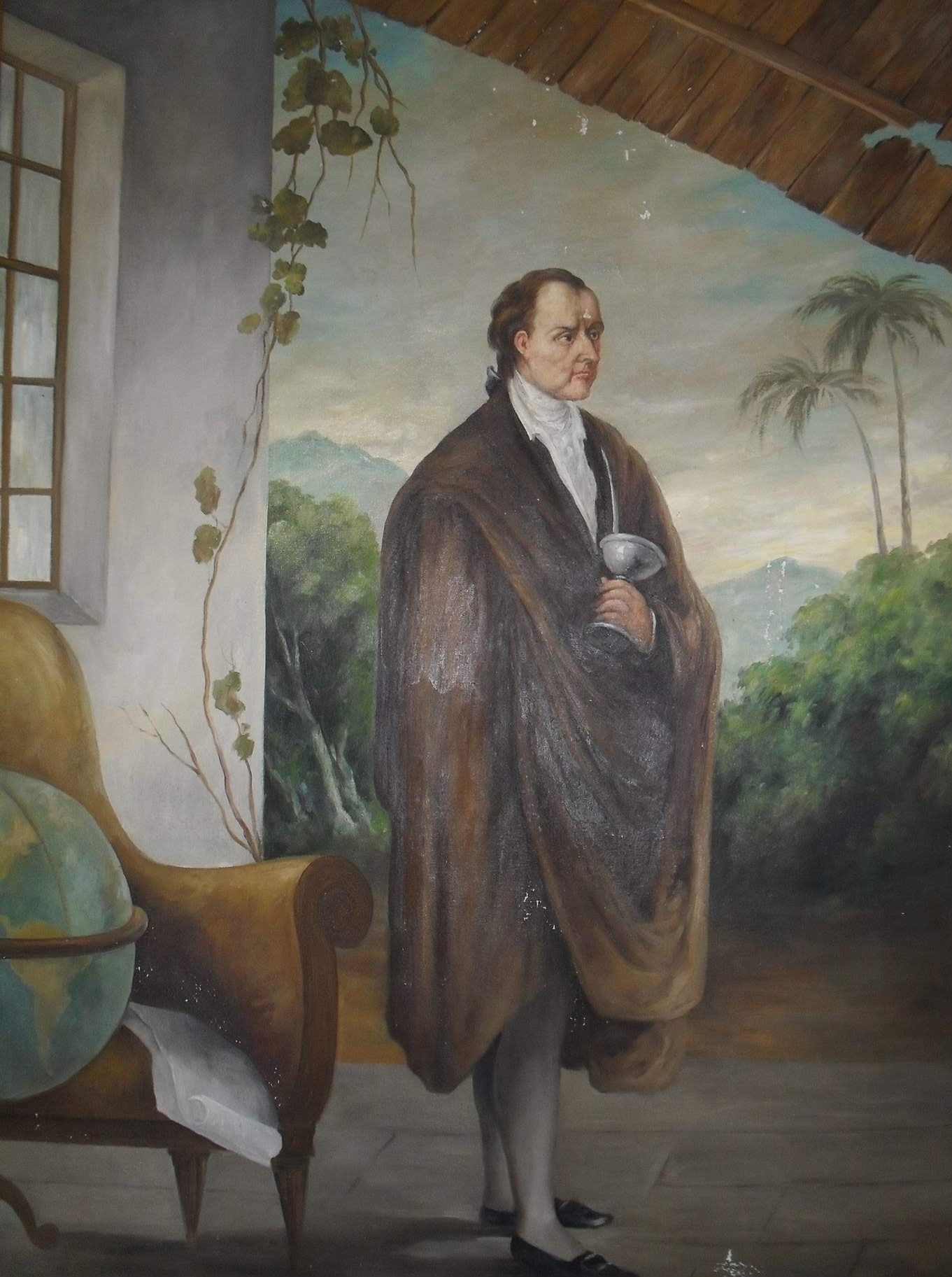
- Nineteenth-century Paraguayan dictator José Gaspar Rodríguez de Francia holding a traditional yerba mate gourd. Dr. Francia's autocratic rule was immortalized in Augusto Roa Bastos' I, the Supreme (1974).
  Augusto Roa Bastos' I, the Supreme (Yo, el Supremo, 1974) is a fictionalized account of the nineteenth-century Paraguayan dictator José Gaspar Rodríguez de Francia. However, it's also a historical account, making use of real documents and accounts of people who knew Francia. Roa's portrayal of a despot in Latin American fiction is distinguished "not only by the quantity of detail lavished on him, but by his remarkable capacity to seem at one moment a person, at another an embodiment of contradictory elements not usually associated with a single person, let alone a powerful tyrant". Its title was derived from the fact that Francia referred to himself as "El Supremo" or "the Supreme". Making use of non-traditional writing techniques, the novel is composed of separate discourses with their own distinctive styles, and the demarcation between them is often blurred. Gerald Martin claims that Roa Bastos's novel "was more immediately and unanimously acclaimed than any novel since One Hundred Years of Solitude, and critics seemed to suspect that its strictly historical importance might be even greater than that of García Márquez's fabulously successful creation".
- Gabriel García Márquez's The Autumn of the Patriarch (El otoño del patriarca, 1975) details the life of an eternal dictator, "El Macho", a fictional character who lives to be over 200 years old. The book is divided into six sections, each retelling the same story of the infinite power held by the archetypal Caribbean tyrant. Márquez based his fictional dictator on a variety of real-life autocrats, including Gustavo Rojas Pinilla of his Colombian homeland, Generalissimo Francisco Franco of Spain (the novel was written in Barcelona), and Venezuela's Juan Vicente Gómez. One of the key characters of the novel is the Indian General Saturno Santos, who devotes himself to "inscrutable service to the patriarch". In this novel, García Márquez proposes an interesting contradiction: "that Latin America's patriarchs owe their most intimate support to their victims of longest standing; and that America's revolution is inconceivable without the Indian". Illustrating the importance of the Indian in Latin America is all the more prudent given that García Márquez's home country, Colombia, is distinguished as literarily not recognizing the Indian populations which are very much alive today.
- Luisa Valenzuela's The Lizard's Tail (Cola de lagartija, 1983) is set in the period after Juan Perón's return to Argentina in 1973, when the Argentine president was heavily influenced by the sinister éminence grise José López Rega. The novel deals specifically with themes surrounding the nature of male-female relationships during this regime of military oppression. The novel's title is a reference to an instrument of torture that was invented in the Southern Cone.
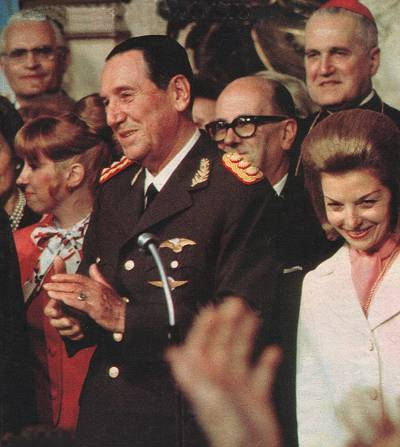
- Argentine populist leader Juan Perón takes office for the third and final time in 1973. He and First Ladies Evita and Isabel (right) have been the subjects of numerous historical novels.
  Tomás Eloy Martínez's The Perón Novel (La novela de Perón, 1985) uses a mixture of historical facts, fiction, and documents to retell the life story of Juan Domingo Perón, "dramatizing the rivalries within the ranks of Peronism". This allowed the author to construct an intimate portrait of Perón rather than an historically accurate one. This method of analyzing Perón, that delves into his early history and family upbringing to theorize the motivation for his actions later in life, can be linked to Sarmiento's similar analyses of Facundo, and through him, Rosas.
- Gabriel García Márquez's The General in His Labyrinth (El general en su laberinto, 1989) is a fictionalized account of the last days in the life of Simón Bolívar. Bolívar, also known as the Great Liberator, freed from Spanish rule the territory that would subsequently become Venezuela, Bolivia, Colombia, Peru, and Ecuador. However the character of the General is not portrayed as the glorious hero that traditional history has presented; instead García Márquez develops a pathetic protagonist, a prematurely aged man who is physically ill and mentally exhausted.
- Mario Vargas Llosa's The Feast of the Goat (La fiesta del chivo, 2000) recounts with "gruesome detail and dramatic intensity" the last days of the tyrant and dictator Rafael Leónidas Trujillo. Llosa describes Trujillo's weakening dominance over the Dominican Republic, as he becomes infuriated that, despite being a long-standing ally of the United States because of his anti-communist stance, he is no longer in favour with the U.S. administration who have withdrawn their backing after discovering his extensive human rights violations. Following several interwoven storylines—those of Trujillo, his assassins, and the daughter of a man who once served in Trujillo's inner circle of advisers, Urania Cabral—this novel reveals both the political and social environment in the Dominican Republic, past and present. The story opens and closes with Urania's story, effectively framing the narrative in terms of remembering and understanding the past and its legacy for the present.

=== "Not quite" dictator novels ===
Latin American novels that explore political themes, but that do not centre upon the rule of a particular dictator, are informally classified as "not quite dictator novels". For example, Libro de Manuel (A Manual for Manuel, 1973), by Julio Cortázar, is a postmodern novel about urban guerrillas and their revolutionary struggle, which asks the reader to examine the broader societal matters of language, sexuality, and the modes of interpretation. In the Time of the Butterflies (1994), by Julia Álvarez, tells the story of the Mirabal sisters, whom patriotism transformed from well-behaved Catholic débutantes to political dissenters against the thirty-year dictatorship of the Trujillo régime in the Dominican Republic. The novel sought to illuminate the officially obscured history of the deaths of the Mirabal sisters, not to determine what happened to them, but to determine how the Mirabal sisters happened to the national politics of the Dominican Republic. In the mock-diary "Intimate Diary of Solitude" (third part of El imperio de los sueños 1988; Empire of Dreams, 1994), by Giannina Braschi, the protagonist is Mariquita Samper, the diarist who shoots the narrator of the Latin American Boom in revolt against his dictatorial control of the fictional narration. Moreover, in Braschi's most recent work United States of Banana (2011), the Puerto Rican prisoner Segismundo overthrows his father, the King of the United States of Banana, who had imprisoned him for more than a hundred years in the dungeon of the Statue of Liberty, for the crime of having been born. The story of Distant Star (1996), by Roberto Bolaño, begins on 11 September 1973, with the coup d’état by General Augusto Pinochet against Salvador Allende, the President of Chile. The writer and professor of literature Raymond Leslie Williams describes the aforementioned novels as not-quite-dictator-novels, which are reminiscent of the genre for being "acutely and subtly political fiction" that addresses themes different from those of the dictator novel, which cannot be divorced from the politics of the stories, and so each "can be read as a meditation on the horror of absolute power".

== Legacy ==
Although it is difficult to establish the exact origin of the dictator novel in the nineteenth century, its intellectual influence spans Latin American Literature. Most of the novels were written in the middle years of the twentieth century, and each has a unique literary style that employed techniques of the "new novel", by which the writer rejected the formal structure of conventional literary realism, arguing that "its simplistic assumption that reality is easily observable" is a narrative flaw. As a genre, the dictator novel redefined the literary concept of "the novel" in order to compel the readers to examine the ways in which political and social mores affect their daily lives. Therefore, the regional politics and the social issues of the stories yielded to universal human concerns, thus the traditional novel's "ordered world view gives way to a fragmented, distorted or fantastic narrative" in which the reader has an intellectually active role in grasping the thematic gist of the story. Additional to the narrative substance, the novelists redefined the formal literary categories of author, narrator, character, plot, story, and reader, in order to examine the etymological link between "author" and "authority", wherein the figure of the novelist (the author) became very important to the telling of the tale. In the dictator novels, the writers questioned the traditional story-teller role of the novelist as the "privileged, paternal figure, as the authoritative ‘father’, or divine creator, in whom meaning would be seen to originate", and so, the novelists fulfilled the role of the dictator.

== See also ==
- Films depicting Latin American military dictatorships
