= Tevego =

- Location within Paraguay
- Coordinates: 22°49′0″S 57°47′0″W
- Country: Paraguay
- Department: Concepción

Tevego (Note: Also known as Tebego, Etevego, Estevegó, Villa del Divino Salvador, or San Salvador) was a settlement and eventual penal colony in Paraguay between 1813 and 1823. It was repopulated in 1843, but then abandoned during the Paraguayan War in the 1860s.

== History ==
Tevego was founded by order of José Gaspar Rodríguez de Francia in 1813 as a colony for mulattoes to defend the inhospitable northern borders of Paraguay. It came under constant attack from Guaycurú natives, and the garrison and their families were moved to nearby settlements. From then on it became a prison camp, mostly for vagrant and petty criminal mulattoes who willingly volunteered for hard labour to shorten their sentences. However, as attacks became more frequent, Tevego was finally evacuated by de Francia, its inmates deported to prisons in the nearby city of Concepción.

The Scottish writer and merchant John Parish Robertson, who lived in Paraguay and worked closely with de Francia, mentions in his book Francia's Reign of Terror, Being the Continuation of Letters On Paraguay, that Tevego

"is a place, of the atmosphere is one great mass of malaria, and the heat suffocating, - where the surrounding country is uninterrupted marsh - where venomous insects and reptiles abound, - and where the fiercest and yet unsubdued tribes of Indians are making continual in-roads. No huts but those constructed in the boughs of trees, or by a few hides and mats, are to be seen; no provisions are to be obtained but those from the Portuguese, or the chase; and no protection is to be afforded but that of a small guard of militia, to awe and tyrannise of the colonists. Many would prefer confinement in the public prison to banishment to Tevego."

In 1843, three years after de Francia's death, Tevego was re-inhabited by orders of Carlos Antonio López, Paraguay's new president, this time renamed Villa del Divino Salvador (Village of the Divine Savior), later shortened to San Salvador. Still unsuccessful, the settlement was destroyed by the Brazilians during the Paraguayan War, its inhabitants fleeing.

== Location ==
There is no exact record of the location of Tevego, but according to a map dated 1860, Tevego was situated on the Argentine border, close to the Bolivian border, roughly 70 miles southwest from San Ignacio.

== In literature ==
Tevego is mentioned frequently by the character of de Francia in Augusto Roa Bastos’s novel I, the Supreme.
