= I, the Supreme =

1974 book by Augusto Roa Bastos

- First edition (Spanish)
- Author: Augusto Roa Bastos
- Original title: Yo el Supremo
- Translator: Helen Lane
- Language: Spanish
- Genre: Historical novel, dictator novel
- Publication date: 1974
- Publication place: Paraguay
- English publication date: 1986
- Media type: Print (Hardback & paperback)
- ISBN: 978-1-56478-247-2 (Dalkey Archive Press, 2000)
- OCLC: 43370395
- Dewey Decimal: 863/.64 21
- LC Class: PQ8259.R56 Y613 2000

I, the Supreme (orig. Spanish Yo el Supremo) is a historical novel written by exiled Paraguayan author Augusto Roa Bastos. It is a fictionalized account of the nineteenth-century Paraguayan dictator José Gaspar Rodríguez de Francia, who was also known as "Dr. Francia". The book's title derives from the fact that Francia referred to himself as "El Supremo" or "the Supreme". The first in a long line of dictators, the Supreme was a severe, calculating despot. The central themes of the novel are power and language and the relation between the two. The Supreme believes himself to be above all power and history: "I don't write history. I make it. I can remake it as I please, adjusting, stressing, enriching its meaning and truth." Yet this assertion is constantly challenged by the very fact that while he achieves power by means of writing and dictating, these very same methods can be used by others to dispute his authority. Not even his own identity, represented by the personal pronoun I, is safe and can easily be usurped as is demonstrated by the incident of the pasquinade. Language, as powerful as it is, can never be controlled and can just as easily be used as an instrument of coercion as an instrument of resistance.

During the time the book was written, Paraguay was under the dictatorship of Alfredo Stroessner, who went on to rule the country even longer than Francia did. Many consider the book to be at least in part a thinly disguised attack on Stroessner who used methods similar to Francia's to achieve and maintain the effective control of the country, including the swift elimination of opposition, the employment of torture, and intolerance of dissent. In its portrayal of Francia and criticism of Stroessner, I, the Supreme belongs to the genre of novelas de dictadores or dictator novels, and also to the Latin American Boom, a literary movement of the 1960s and 1970s. The book was first published in Spanish in 1974, and in English (translation by Helen Lane) in 1986.

Like many other works of the Latin American Boom, the book never became an international best-seller. It was, however, highly regarded by critics, with Gerald Martin claiming that it was "an exceptional cultural phenomenon". Martin goes on to suggest that it was "more immediately and unanimously acclaimed than any novel since One Hundred Years of Solitude, [and its] strictly historical importance [may] be even greater than that of García Márquez's fabulously successful creation." The book's handling of the themes of power and language was also praised. Still, the novel was not well received by Stroessner's government and Roa Bastos became "one of the three citizens forbidden to return" to Paraguay as a result.

== Historical context ==
After declaring independence from colonial Spain in May 1811, landlocked Paraguay established itself as the first Republic of South America. Dr. Francia was elected by the junta (or congress) to office, and he established himself as dictator for life, until his death in 1840. He ruled with a despotic populism in which the ideals he had drawn from the philosophers of the French Enlightenment were tempered by his aristocratic insistence on absolute rule. As John T. Deiner explains, he "created an army in which all citizens were required to serve. He confiscated property from the upper classes and used the state's coercive power to direct the working of that land by the army". He also isolated the country from the outside world, restricting foreign trade and mobility. Political opposition was not tolerated.

Francia's rule was the beginning of a long line of dictators, including Carlos Antonio López (who was president of Paraguay with dictatorial powers from 1844 to 1862) and López's son, Francisco Solano López (who ruled between 1862 and 1870). It was Solano López who unwisely initiated the Paraguayan War (1864–70), which crippled Paraguay, reduced its population by half, and forced many others into exile, creating a Paraguay that Roa Bastos described as "the land without men of the men without land".

In the twentieth century, Paraguay was dominated by the dictatorial figure of Alfredo Stroessner who ruled the country for thirty-five years (from 1954 to 1989) and was in power at the time at which Roa Bastos was writing I, the Supreme. Roa Bastos's novel can be perceived as in part a thinly disguised attack on Stroessner, who ruled Paraguay even longer than Francia. He came to power after the 1947 Civil War, which had destroyed all parties of the centre and the left and drove more than a third of Paraguay's population into exile. He assumed presidency after a series of coups in 1954. He gained complete control of the military, eliminated potential rivals, and closely monitored and participated in allocations of national resources. As Deiner argues, "[T]he novel's El Supremo (Francia) and Stroessner in the twentieth century used similar methods for dominating national politics. Neither tolerated effective opposition. Both rulers were extremely suspicious of any potential opponents, quickly acting to imprison and torture anyone suspected. Both were ruthless in their intolerance of dissent." As Rowe and Whitfield describe Stroessner's rule, "he inherited all Francia's despotism, but none of his populism [...] he rule[d] over a country where human and civil rights are honored only in their breach".

== Influences ==
Literary critic Todd Garth argues that I, the Supreme is influenced by twentieth-century Argentine writer Macedonio Fernández, as well as other avant garde artists such as Jorge Luis Borges and Julio Cortázar. Garth suggests that Macedonio and Roa Bastos are similar in use of metaphysical language and techniques used to reconstruct reality, as Dr. Francia does in his dictated creation of the Supreme, the ruler of all reality. Macedonio's writing utilized characters that did not fit the archetype of Western fiction, each only having meaning through their interaction with others in a collective and often never experiencing growth or development in order to construct atemporal spaces of mythmaking that challenge reality. Roa Bastos borrows from these ideas yet situates them in existing political and social history to challenge perceived conceptions of the past's factuality. He dismantles national Paraguayan mythology, which is so intimately intertwined with the life of Dr. Francia, elucidating the distinctions between mythic and mythological. The novel can only accomplish this task within the metaphysical space of mythmaking. Whereas Macedonio attacks the concept of the individual as subject while admitting the fact that to write makes oneself a subject, Roa Bastos recognizes this paradox and exploits it, utilizing it in concerns of political and social nature.

Themes from Plato and his influence on Western political philosophy are also prevalent in the novel. Mainly, the debate over the nature of "Good Society" and how to achieve it are seen in the positions of the Supreme. He argues that it is the ruler's role, as well as his duty and obligation, to bring about the good society, and this can only be done by the imposition of absolute order from above. The dictator's job is to bring about the Good Society, to impose the needed order, and the people's job is to obey the dictator, thereby enjoying the fruits of the good society. The result of such behavior by both the ruler and the ruled will be good for everyone.

The novel is also clearly influenced by earlier writing on dictatorship, predominantly Domingo Sarmiento's Facundo. The similarities can be seen in how both novels are written by exiles, in their thinly veiled attacks on their homeland's current dictator, and in their authors' shared use of "pasquinade/hand-written message" devices to begin both novels. Francia's "Perpetual Circular" also contains several allusions to the Argentine gaucho in Juan Facundo Quiroga's work, as well as to the dictator, Juan Manuel de Rosas, both of whom were the object of Sarmiento's critique.

== Genre ==
I, the Supreme is a good example of the dictator novel, a genre of Latin American literature that challenges the role of the dictator in Latin American society. The dictator novel draws upon the relationship between power, writing, and dictatorship, and so is an allegory of the role of the Latin American writer in society.

The goal of the dictator novel is not to dissect and to analyze the rule of particular dictators with a focus on historical accuracy, but rather to examine the more abstract nature of authority figures and to question the idea of authority in general. To be considered a dictator novel, a book must have strong political themes that draw upon historical accounts, while critically examining the power held by an authoritarian figure, allowing the specific to explain the general. Although mostly associated with the Latin American Boom of the 1960s and 1970s, "all fictional depictions of the Latin American 'strong-man' have an important antecedent in Domingo Faustino Sarmiento's Facundo, a work written as a sociological treatise".

Many dictator novels, including I, the Supreme, belong to the Latin American Boom, a literary movement which began in the 1960s and 1970s, when the work of a group of relatively young Latin American novelists became widely circulated in Europe and throughout the world. The Boom novels were essentially modernist novels, which according to Pope, relied on superposition of different points of view, blurring time and linearity. He further notes, "linguistically self-assured, it used the vernacular without apologies". Other notable characteristics of the Boom include the treatment of both "rural and urban settings", internationalism (an emphasis on both the historical and the political), as well as "questioning of regional as well as, or more than, national identity; awareness of hemisphereic as well as worldwide economic and ideological issues; polemicism; and timeliness".

This is not the first fictional biographical work tied to Dr. Francia and his dictatorship. The American novelist Edward Lucas White published his El Supremo in 1916. As his extensive "selected bibliography on the history of Paraguay during the days of 'El Supremo', José Gaspar Rodríguez de Francia" and brief preface point out, White took great pains to make his historical novel quite realistic and historically accurate. The 1967 reprint has an additional brief, six page introduction to set the work in context. White's novel covers the period from 1816 to 1817.

== Synopsis ==
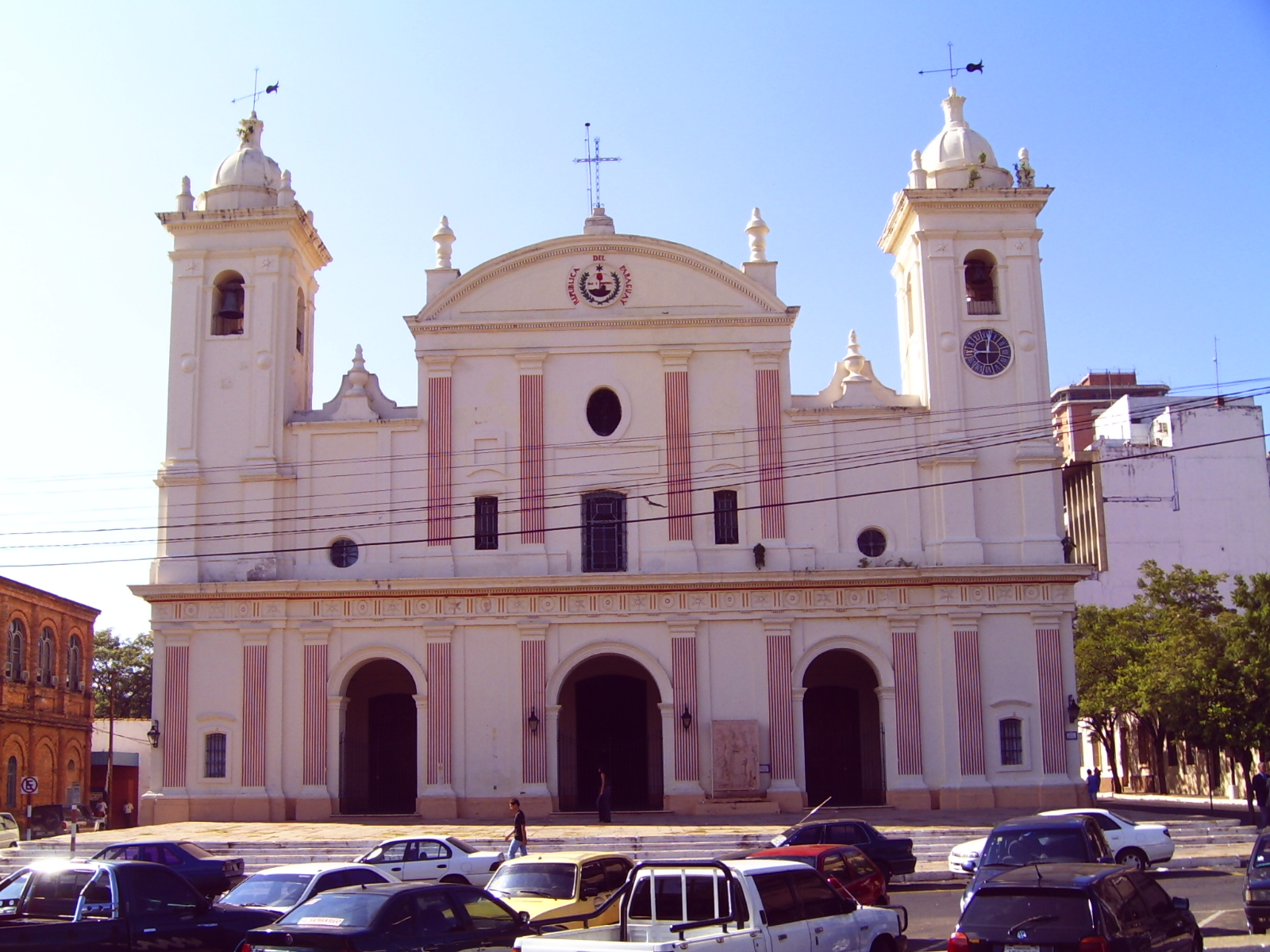
Asunción Cathedral as it is today.

As critic John King notes, "it is impossible to summarize this extraordinary novel in a few lines. It incorporates the latest developments in linguistic theory and practice, talks of the arbitrariness and unreliability of language that purports to describe reality, rereads and comments upon the various histories and travelers' accounts of Paraguay, ranges across the breadth of Latin American history, implicitly condemning Stroessner and debating with Fidel Castro, and exploring once again the gap between writer and reader."

The book does, however, start by promising a linear narrative. It opens with the title words, set in a font designed to look like handwriting, heralding what appears to be an official order:

I the Supreme Dictator of the Republic
Order that on the occasion of my death my corpse be beheaded; my head placed on a pike for three days in the Plaza de la República, to which the people are to be summoned by the sounding of a full peal of bells...

This pronouncement, it turns out, is not an official declaration. It is an imitation or forgery, found "nailed to the door of the cathedral" in Paraguay's capital, Asunción. Immediately following, then, is a discussion of this pasquinade: Dr. Francia, the Supreme, and his secretary, Policarpo Patiño, discuss its meaning and possible provenance. Patiño is set the task of uncovering the perpetrator: "You are to start tracking down the handwriting of the pasquinade in all the files."

But this linear detection narrative soon starts to unravel. The Supreme casts doubt even on the presumption that the declaration is indeed a forgery, or rather suggests that the forgery could itself be forged: "Suppose that I myself am an author of pasquinades." Moreover, the literary genre is undone by the introduction of footnotes (which blur the line between fiction and fact), and the narrative transparency subverted by the fact that the novel asserts its own materiality with interpolations such as "(the rest of the sentence burned, illegible)" and "(edge of the folio burned)". The effect of these notes is to remind readers that they are reading a book, and that this book is incomplete, damaged, and fallible.

As the novel continues, it becomes more and more caught up in digressions, such that the original narrative line is apparently forgotten. The Supreme and his secretary discuss an often bizarre series of topics: a meteor that is apparently chained to Francia's desk; a prison camp in Tevego whose inhabitants have been turned to stone; and increasingly the dictator also ruminates on the past, particularly the events of Paraguay's foundation when he had to fend off the attention of Spaniards, Argentines, and Brazilians, all of whom threatened the nascent country's independence. Chronology and logic are seemingly abandoned: at one point the dictator discusses the date of his own death; elsewhere he mentions events that will only happen long afterwards, such as the Chaco War of the 1930s (in which Roa Bastos himself fought).

Moreover, readers are increasingly made aware of the marginal but insistent voice of the mysterious compiler. At the center of the book, it is revealed that the compiler is, in fact, in possession of the same pen used by the Supreme, a "memory-pen" that reproduces images as well as words, but that is now "partially broken, so that today it writes only with very thick strokes that tear the paper, effacing words as it writes them".

The novel ends at the end of Francia's life, with him condemning Patiño to death for supposedly plotting against him, followed by Francia's death in a fire in 1840. As the characters and plot disintegrate, so apparently does the novel. The final line is another interpolation: "(the remainder stuck together, illegible, the rest unable to be found, the worm-eaten letters of the Book hopelessly scattered)." And yet, this is not quite the last word, as it is followed by a "Final Compiler's Note" that reflects on the compilation and the book as a whole. Here the novel seems to pass responsibility on to "the no less fictitious and autonomous reader".

== Characters ==
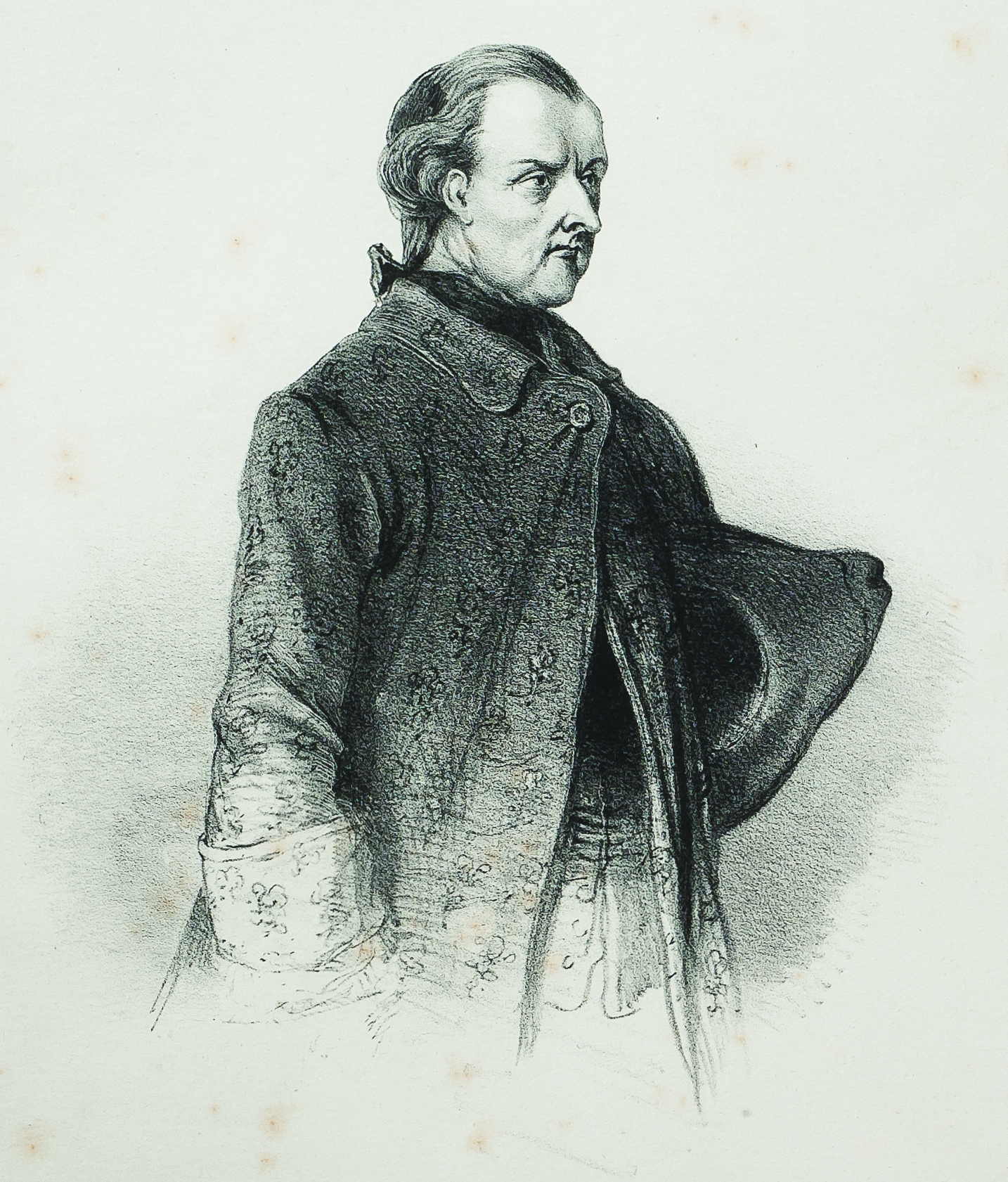
José Gaspar Rodríguez de Francia, the historical figure who appears as the novel's main character

=== Dr. Francia (the Supreme) ===
José Gaspar Rodríguez de Francia, also known as "Dr. Francia", Guarani: Karai Guasu ("Great Lord" in Guaraní), or "the Supreme", is the book's titular character and also undoubtedly its main focus. Most of the book is dedicated to his dictates to his secretary, Patiño. The Supreme is a domineering man, frequently belittling his closest confidant. He is also an infirm man, as the book is set a short time before his death on September 20, 1840. Roa Bastos's portrayal of him walks the line between praise and condemnation. While other authors of dictator novels clearly present their dictators as villains, Roa Bastos makes it unclear as to whether he is defending him or not. As Roberto González Echevarría writes, the Supreme is "constant[ly] [worried] about writing. [This] stems from the fact that he has found and used the power implicit in language itself. The Supreme defines power as being able to do through others what we are unable to do ourselves: language, being separate from what it designates, is the very embodiment of power."

The Supreme is also revealed to be power-crazed in other ways. Michiko Kakutani writes "Francia, it seems, wants to account for everything (his own history, as well as the history of his nation, which he personifies as its leader) as he pours out his story, it becomes clear that he possesses an insatiable desire for power and control—he has even chained a huge meteorite to his desk, as punishment for being a cosmic runaway—and that he also sees himself as two separate beings: as a conniving, paranoiac 'I', beset by the average ego's fears and doubts, and as the 'Supreme', a monstrously powerful presence that even Francia himself must refer to in the third person." The Supreme was personally involved in the affairs of the state to such extent, that it was reported by contemporary press that "[He] personally trained his cavalry in the use of the saber, ascertained the exact number of nails in Fort Orange, awarded 102 pesos to a Frenchman whose anchor had been melted down by the state... lowered the price of salt in the capital, donated state yerba to the people of Saladillo, and denied permission for [someone] to marry in Villa Rica." It was common for him to attend to such specific details in a single evening.

=== Policarpo Patiño ===
Policarpo Patiño is the Supreme's secretary and amanuensis. An "efficient and loyal servant", in historian Hoyt Williams's words, he was "a jack of all trades, [who] arranged audiences, transcribed documents, visited the jails, and conferred with the Dictator on most routine matters. Toward the end of [the Supreme's] life, and presumably with his knowledge, Patiño began signing some official documents that did not bear his master's signature". Much of the book consists of dialogue between the Supreme and his secretary, which Policarpo records as he writes what is dictated to him. In Roberto González Echevarría's words, "Patiño is the quintessential writer". There is, however, some debate about how powerful Patiño actually was. Initially possessing a more powerful role, the Supreme's "personal control over virtually the entirety of [the state]" led to Patiño quickly being demoted from "Government Secretary and scribe" to simply a record keeper. There is evidence, however, that Patiño wielded considerable influence with the Supreme, as "in 1835 Patiño denounced a slave for attempting to induce an abortion in his daughter and to poison him. A close investigation... turned up [that] the daughter had requested the abortion and Patiño had lied, [yet] he was not jailed, and retained his powerful position".

Despite his influence, Patiño is frequently the victim of the Supreme's abuse, even having his own death sentence dictated to him, although in the end he outlives his master. González Echevarría questions whether Patiño "[had] the last laugh? Did he achieve some sort of posthumous power?" This is suggested both because he outlived Dr. Francia, and also because the pen ostensibly used to write the book was given to the author by Patiño's descendant. Therefore, "the editor, who arranges the various texts and annotates them, who thereby exercises final authority over Dr. Francia's versions of himself, is the heir of Policarpo Patiño". The power relationship between the Supreme and his secretary is a microcosm of the book as a whole, with Dr. Francia dominating Patiño completely, even though the latter is intimately associated with the dictator having power at all, given the power he derives from writing.

== Style ==
I, the Supreme is a dense, complicated novel that requires considerable reader involvement. Critic Helene Weldt-Basson suggests that symbolism plays an important role in the novel, one that goes hand-in-hand with the complexity of the writing. She references Tzvetan Todorov's theory of symbolism in literature which suggests that "[there is an] inseparability of symbolism and interpretation. They are, for me, simply two aspects of a single phenomenon." This theory dovetails quite well with the multiple meanings associated with different objects in I, the Supreme.

Although the novel is a dialogue between the Supreme and his secretary, Patiño, there are in fact at least six different types of narration in the text: notebook entries, transcriptions of dialogues, a logbook, the "voice" of the Supreme's father, two documents, and the installments of the perpetual circular, which is ostensibly the main project Patiño and Dr. Francia are working on. In addition to these different layers of narrative, there are also three possible authors: Roa Bastos, the author-compiler, and the "implied author". The latter refers to the "behavior, attitudes, and backgrounds [...] necessary for a proper understanding of the text." The multitude of possibilities regarding the author and the shift between types of narratives, combined with an absence of quotation marks, contribute to this book being described as "undoubtedly, [the author's] most complicated work to date".

Further complicating matters is the fact that the Supreme's "voice echoes back and forth in time—recalling his birth and his youth, only to jump ahead to the future, speaking [from] beyond the grave about the flies that disturb his corpse, the bandits who dare to disturb his sleep".

I, the Supreme is mostly composed of real texts by or about Francia. These range from personal memoirs by historical Paraguayan figures to passages from books written by Europeans in Paraguay at the time. They are arranged by a "Compiler" whose footnotes tell the story of how the book was put together. The body of the novel is composed of a polemical collection of versions of Paraguayan history. The first text is what the Supreme dictates to his assistant Patiño, about what is happening in the present. This includes the constant abuses Francia heaps upon Patiño and their attempts to discover the authors of a pasquinade, found nailed to the door of the Asunción Cathedral, that falsely announces Francia's death and burial arrangements. It is mostly Francia's vulgar rambling, including accusing meek Patiño of attempting to usurp him. The author of the pasquinade is never discovered in spite of their high scrutiny.

The second text is the "Circular Perpetual" that Francia also dictates to Patiño. It is his version of the origins of Paraguayan history, particularly of how he came to power. These texts are highly annotated by the editor, for in them Francia "corrects" versions given by other historical figures, not to mention those given by European travelers.

Finally, there is what Francia writes himself in his "Private Notebook", which is mostly an account of his own life, attempts to write fiction, diatribes against Patiño and his kind, philosophical musings and ramblings, and other sundry exercises. All of these texts have been edited, for one finds in them, besides the footnotes, indications in italics and within brackets such as "on the margin it is written", "there is a hole in the paper here", etc. So that while they do not compose a homogeneous text, held together by the rhetorical power of a narrative voice, and in fact are anything but homogeneous, these texts bear the presence of the editor in these discrete marks and indications.

== Themes ==
=== Language ===
The novel revolves around a central theme of language—written and spoken, truth and myth—and the power inherent in all of its forms, a power that is often only present in the deconstruction of communication. González Echevarria argues that "Dr. Francia's fear of the pasquinade, his abuse of [Patiño], his constant worry about writing all stem from the fact that he has found and used the power implicit in language itself. The Supreme defines power as being able to do through others what we are unable to do ourselves: language, being separate from what it designates, is the very embodiment of power, for things act and mean through it without ceasing to be themselves. Dr. Francia has also realized that he cannot control language, particularly written language, that it has a life of its own that threatens him."

The significance of linguistic domination is present in the novel. Paraguay is the most bilingual country in Latin America, where, as of 1962, 52% spoke the indigenous language Guaraní as well as Spanish, only 5% only spoke Spanish, whereas 43% spoke only Guaraní which is essentially a language of oral culture. As Roa Bastos claims, "this inevitably leads the Paraguayan writer to the necessity of creating a literature that goes beyond literature, of speaking against the word, or writing against writing." At the time of I the Supreme the majority of the people spoke Guaraní while Spanish was the dominant political language. Francia himself was known for his support of Guaraní and his "persecution of the Spanish-speaking elite". As Deiner argues, "El Supremo is aware of the difficulties of incorporating rural and underclass Paraguayans into the national political system, even though he is sympathetic toward them. But the common person, the Guarani speaker, remains unheard. Roa Bastos cleverly demonstrates this political isolation/marginalization by constantly introducing Guaraní phrases, phrases which are incomprehensible to most readers, phrases from a spoken, not written language. The phrases are there in a sort of ghostly form, hanging in air, denying full participation in the novel to the reader, and thus causing the reader to empathize with real world Paraguayan citizens who are denied political participation by their political rulers."

=== Power ===
The novel's format, its various multiple sources, its manipulation of linear time and its inclusion of supernatural elements (talking dogs and meteor rifles, for example) all serve to deconstruct the idea of absolute power, by creating an ambiguity between fact and myth, between Dr Francia and the Supreme, and between Roa Bastos and the Compiler. Francia places himself above all power and history: "I don't write history. I make it. I can remake it as I please, adjusting, stressing, enriching its meaning and truth." Yet in the Compiler's notes and retelling of events, the novel is presented as a genuine version of history, one that contradicts and questions the Supreme's. In their collectivity, they deny the illusion of absolute power, whether the power is that of Francia the dictator or Roa Bastos the writer. This ambiguity between myth and fact is elaborated on at the end of the novel in the fictional debate over the Supreme's remains; it questions the nature of national political myth, and how heroes and villains are created in it and where the Supreme falls into those categories after being portrayed as both by Roa Bastos. As Deiner poses the question raised by the novel, "Is he to be portrayed as a valiant leader who held the country together in the face of enormous external aggression, or as a despot who laid the basis for almost two centuries of exploitation of Paraguay's peoples by its leaders?" The answer is not so much of importance to the novel, so much as the fact that the question itself exists, thereby confirming the power of writing over so called "absolute" power.

On a more basic level, the novel also has political themes to it. As John Deiner writes, "I, the Supreme is a surprisingly political novel. It is a commentary on Paraguay's first great political leader [...] and a condemnation of the country's last, General Alfredo Stroessner." Deiner contends that the political system and occurrences in I the Supreme are symbolic of those of other Paraguayan leaders. Suggesting the book is connected to more recent leaders of Paraguay, Deiner writes "although ostensibly a fictionalized account of the life of El Supremo, the novel is also a thinly disguised attack on the politics and rule of Alfredo Stroessner, [the dictator] ruling Paraguay at the time I, the Supreme was published (in exile) in 1974." In summary, Deiner suggest that the novel "serves as the quintessential example of the personalist dictator model of Latin American political systems. Francia's was one of the earliest versions of this model, and Stroessner's was one of the last personalist dictator regimes."

== Reception ==
Gerald Martin observes that "the publication of I the Supreme in 1974 was an exceptional cultural phenomenon". He goes on to note that Roa Bastos's novel "was more immediately and unanimously acclaimed than any novel since One Hundred Years of Solitude, and critics seemed to suspect that its strictly historical importance might be even greater than that of García Márquez's fabulously successful creation".

The Stroessner government did not react kindly to this or others of Roa Bastos's writings. On a rare visit to Paraguay from France in 1982, he was denounced as a "Marxist subversive" and became "one of the three citizens forbidden to return".

Outside Paraguay, Roa Bastos's works never became best-sellers like those of other members of the Boom such as Gabriel García Márquez or Mario Vargas Llosa, yet as a recognition of his literary prestige he was awarded the Miguel de Cervantes Prize in 1989—this is the most prestigious literary award in the Spanish-speaking world, and honors the lifetime achievement of an outstanding writer in the Spanish language. In the English-speaking world, the British critic Bernard Levin said about reading I, the Supreme upon its translation in 1986 that "he had read the book with an exhilaration similar to 'climbing Everest twice in one weekend'". Michiko Kakutani, writing for The New York Times, also remarked in that year that "however cumbersome and rhetorical I, the Supreme may often feel, the novel remains a prodigious meditation not only on history and power, but on the nature of language itself."

Also in 1986 Carlos Fuentes, for The New York Times, wrote of Roa Bastos: "He is his country's most eminent writer; his works are few, self-contained (very Paraguayan) and brilliantly written. Yet his masterpiece, I, the Supreme, which first came out in Spanish in 1974 and finally reaches the English-reading public now, in a masterly translation by Helen Lane, is the kind of summa that absorbs everything that the writer has done before. This is Mr. Roa Bastos' dialogue with himself through history and through a monstrous historical figure whom he has to imagine and understand if he is ever to imagine and understand himself and his people."

About the 12-year delay between the book's initial publication in Spanish and its translation into English, Fuentes reports that Roa Bastos said: "The book has been published in almost all the principal languages of the world, including Japanese and Chinese. [...] In Europe, it has only not been translated into Finnish and Albanian". He also stated that "he was intrigued that Americans 'would start with the work of mine considered the most difficult'".
