= Dr. Francia (Asunción) =

- Barrio
- Interactive map of Dr. Francia
- Country: Paraguay
- Autonomous Capital District: Gran Asunción
- City: Asunción

Area
  - Total: 1.71 km^{2} (0.66 sq mi)
- Elevation: 43 m (141 ft)

Population
  - Total: 12,860

Dr. Francia is a neighbourhood (barrio) of Asunción, Paraguay. The neighbourhood owes its name to the former Paraguayan consul and dictator José Gaspar Rodríguez de Francia.
