= Hijo de hombre =

1960 Paraguayan novel by Augusto Roa Bastos

- First edition (publ. Losada)
- Author: Augusto Roa Bastos
- Publication date: 1960

Hijo de hombre (transl. Son of Man) is a 1960 novel by the Paraguayan author Augusto Roa Bastos.

Roa Bastos' first published novel, Hijo de Hombre represents his definitive break with poetry. It portrays the struggle between the governing élite and the oppressed in Paraguay from 1912 until 1936, just after the end of the Chaco War with Bolivia. This novel draws upon a system of Christian metaphors as part of the neo-Baroque concept of magic realism to examine the pain of being Paraguayan. Hijo de Hombre contrasts two figures: Miguel Vera and Cristóbal Jara. Vera narrates the odd chapters, although he might also be the narrator of all nine chapters (this is unclear). He is a well-to-do and educated romantic supporter of revolution, who is unable to take real action to support his ideals, and in the end betrays them (not unlike Judas). Jara, on the other hand, is an uneducated “son of man” who becomes a Christ-like leader for Paraguayan people through action and strength of character and will lead them to salvation. Although it was a massive critical success, Roa Bastos remained quite dissatisfied with the work for a number reasons.

According to the Monthly Review Press printing of the English translation (MRP, 1988): "Son of Man was first published in English by Victor Gallancz Ltd., copyright 1965 by Victor Gallancz Ltd. It was originally published in Spanish under the title Hijo de Hombre, copyright 1961 by Editorial Losado, S.A., Buenos Aires." The MRP edition is translated by Rachel Caffyn and published in the Voices of Resistance Series. There is a 4-page Foreword by Ariel Dorfman and a 15-page Afterword by Jean Franco. This paperback's text of the work itself is 249 pages. ISBN 0-85345-733-6 (pbk.). The contents as follows:

1. Chapter 1, Son of Man, set in Itapé, is the story of Gaspar Mara, the leper, and Macario Francia, beggar (pgs. 15–41).
2. Chapter 2, Wood & Flesh, set in Sapucaí, is the story of the Russian doctor in 1917 (pgs. 42–60).
3. Chapter 3, Stations, set in Itapé, is a Sapucaí to Asunción train trip (pgs. 61–78).
4. Chapter 4, Exodus, set in the Takuru-Puku Mate slave plantation, is the story of the escape of Casiano & Nati in 1914 (pgs. 79–113).
5. Chapter 5, Home, set in Sapucaí, is the story of following the self-made railroad track to find Casiano's coach in 1932 (pgs. 114–129).
6. Chapter 6, Fiesta, set in Sapucaí, is the story of the Paraguayan Army, having defeated the rebels, looking for Cristóbal and prisoners taken off by train in 1932 (pgs. 130–160).
7. Chapter 7, Doomed Men, set in the prison camp of Pena Hermosa, imprisoned on an island penal colony as well as in the Army at the siege of Boqueron in the Chaco War (pgs. 161–190).
8. Chapter 8, Special Mission, set in the Chaco, is the story of trying to get a convoy of trucks to the lone company (pgs. 191–235).
9. Chapter 9, Aftermath, set in Itapé after the Chaco War in 1935-36 (pgs. 236–263).

Chapters 1, 3, 5, 7, and 9 narrated by Miguel Vera, who is identified in Chapter 6 (p. 134) as being banished for his seditious activity, "an officer of the Military Academy", a Lieutenant.
