= Penal colony =

Remote settlement housing convicts

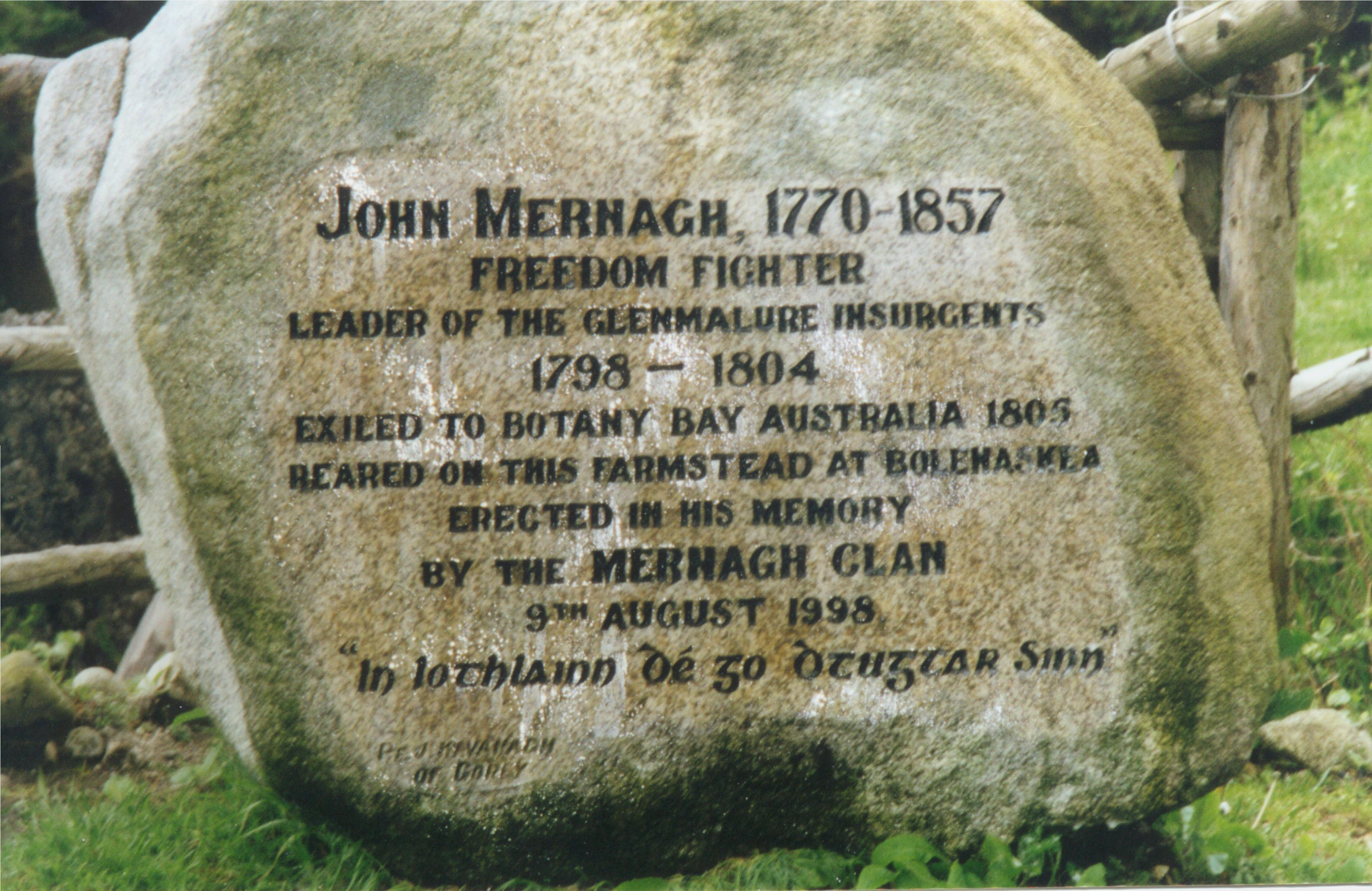
Inscribed stone honouring Irish prisoner John Mernagh

A penal colony or exile colony is a settlement used to exile prisoners and separate them from the general population by placing them in a remote location, often an island or distant colonial territory. Although the term can be used to refer to a correctional facility located in a remote location, it is more commonly used to refer to communities of prisoners overseen by wardens or governors having absolute authority.

Historically, penal colonies have often been used for penal labour in an economically underdeveloped part of a state's (usually colonial) territories, and on a far larger scale than a prison farm.

== British Empire ==
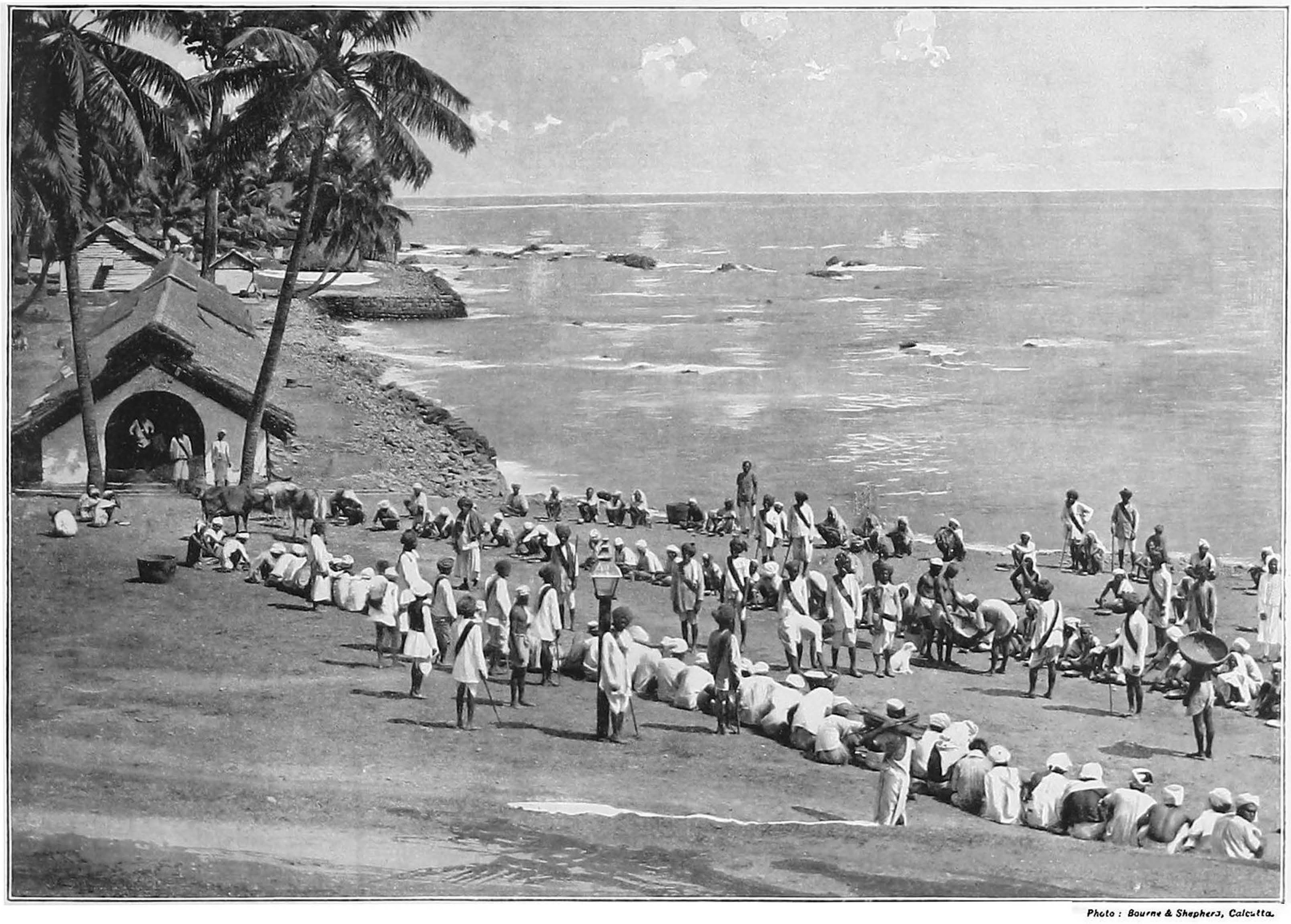
Penal colony in the Andaman Islands, British Raj (c. 1890s)

With the passage of the Transportation Act 1717, the British government initiated the penal transportation of indentured servants to Britain's colonies in the Americas, although none of the North American colonies were solely penal colonies. British merchants would be in charge of transporting the convicts across the Atlantic to the colonies where they would be auctioned off to planters. Many of the indentured servants were sentenced to seven-year terms, which gave rise to the colloquial term "His Majesty's Seven-Year Passengers". It is estimated that between 1718 and 1776 about 30,000 convicts were transported to at least nine of the continental colonies, whereas between 1700 and 1775 about 250,000 to 300,000 white immigrants came to mainland North America as a whole. More than two-thirds of these felons were transported to the Chesapeake to work for Southern landowners; in Maryland, during the thirty years before 1776, convicts composed more than one-quarter of all immigrants. However, it is commonly maintained that the vast majority of felons taken to America were political criminals, not those guilty of social crimes such as theft; for example, it was noted of Virginia that "the crimes of which they were convicted were chiefly political, and the number transported for social crimes was never considerable." The colony of Georgia, by contrast, was planned by James Oglethorpe specifically to take in debtors and other social criminals. Oglethorpe referred to them as "the worthy poor" in a philanthropic effort to create a rehabilitative colony where prisoners could earn a second chance at life, learning trades and working off their debts. The success of Oglethorpe's vision is debated.

When routes to the Americas closed after the outbreak of American Revolutionary War in 1776, British prisons started to become overcrowded. Since immediate stopgap measures proved themselves ineffective, in 1785 Britain decided to use parts of what is now known as Australia as de jure penal settlements, becoming the first colonies in the British Empire founded solely to house convicts. Leaving Portsmouth, England on 13 May 1787, the First Fleet transported the first ~800 convicts and ~250 marines to Botany Bay. Between 1788 and 1868, about 162,000 convicts were transported from Great Britain and Ireland to various penal colonies in Australia. Australian penal colonies in late 18th century included Norfolk Island and New South Wales, and in early 19th century also Van Diemen's Land (Tasmania) and Moreton Bay (Queensland).

Among the 162,000 convicts sent to Colonial Australia were 3,600 political prisoners. This included a range of dissenters, including the Tolpuddle Martyrs, Luddites, and members of Irish nationalist groups such as the Society of United Irishmen and Young Ireland.

Without the allocation of the available convict labour to farmers, to pastoral squatters, and to government projects such as roadbuilding, colonisation of Australia may not have been possible, especially considering the considerable drain on non-convict labor caused by several gold rushes that took place in the second half of the 19th century after the flow of convicts had dwindled and (in 1868) ceased. A proposal to make the Cape Colony a penal colony was deeply unpopular with local residents, sparking the Convict crisis of 1849.

Bermuda, off the North American continent, was also used during the Victorian period. Convicts housed in hulks were used to build the Royal Naval Dockyard there, and during the Second Boer War (1899–1902), Boer prisoners-of-war were sent to the archipelago and imprisoned on one of the smaller islands.

In British India, the colonial government established various penal colonies. Two of the largest ones were on the Andaman Islands and Hijli. In the early days of settlement, Singapore Island was the recipient of Indian convicts, who were tasked with clearing the jungles for settlement and early public works.

== France ==
France sent criminals to tropical penal colonies including Louisiana in the early 18th century. Devil's Island in French Guiana received some 80,000 forgers and other criminals between 1852 and 1939. At its worst the mortality rate was 75%, earning it the nicknamed the 'Dry Guillotine'. New Caledonia and its Isle of Pines in Melanesia (in the South Sea) received transported dissidents like the Communards, Kabyle rebels and convicted criminals between the 1860s and 1897.

== Americas ==
Selection of former penal colonies in South America
- Brazil had a prison on the island of Fernando de Noronha from 1938 to 1945.
- Gorgona Island in Colombia housed a state high-security prison from the 1950s. Convicts were dissuaded from escaping by the venomous snakes in the interior of the island and by the sharks patrolling the 30 km to the mainland. The penal colony closed in 1984 and the last prisoners were transferred to the mainland. As of 2015 most of the former jail buildings are covered by dense vegetation, but some remain visible.
- Guantanamo Bay detention camp in Cuba is used by the United States as a penal colony.
- Mexico uses the island of Isla María Madre (in the Marías Islands) as a penal colony. With a small population (fewer than 1,200), the colony is governed by a state official who is both the governor of the islands and chief judge. The military command is independent of the government and is exercised by an officer of the Mexican Navy. The other islands are uninhabited. Mexico announced on 18 February 2019 that it will close the Islas Marías Federal Prison, replacing it with a new cultural center.
- During the 19th century Chile used Fuerte Bulnes and Punta Arenas on the Strait of Magellan as a penal colony (1844–1852).
- Ecuador has used two islands in the Galápagos archipelago as penal colonies: the Island of San Cristóbal (1869–1904) and Isabela Island (1945–1959).
- Paraguay's first ruler and supreme dictator José Gaspar Rodríguez de Francia opened the penal colony of Tevego in 1813, where mostly petty criminals were sent. It was abandoned in 1823, but re-established in 1843 as San Salvador. It was evacuated towards the end of the Paraguayan War of 1864–1870; soon afterwards Brazilian troops destroyed it.
- Argentina had a penal colony in Ushuaia, Tierra del Fuego, in the Patagonia region. It was active between 1902 and 1947.
- Once Spanish presence in Valdivia was reestablished in 1645 authorities had convicts from all-over the Viceroyalty of Peru construct the Valdivian Fort System. The convicts, many of whom were Afro-Peruvians, became later soldier-settlers. Close contacts with indigenous Mapuche meant many soldiers spoke Spanish and had some command of Mapudungun.

== Elsewhere ==
- Following Alexander the Great's conquest of modern day Afghanistan and Pakistan, the Greco-Bactrian Kingdom was used as a penal colony. Today, 18% of the population of Peshawar has Greek genetic markers.
- The Meiji Government of Japan used Abashiri Prison in Abashiri, Hokkaido as a penal colony in 1890. The prison later turned into an ordinary jail in 1894.
- The Qing Empire of 1636–1912 used general-ruled provinces Jilin (Ningguta) in north-east China and Xinjiang in north-west China as penal colonies.
- Imperial Russia used Siberia and Russian Far East for penal colonies (katorga) for criminals and dissidents. Though geographically contiguous with heartland Russia, Siberia provided both remoteness and a harsh climate. In 1857 a penal colony was established on the island of Sakhalin. The Soviet Gulag system and its tsarist predecessor, the katorga system, provided penal labor to develop forestry, logging, and mining industries, construction enterprises, as well as highways and railroads across Siberia and in other areas. In the modern Russian Federation, corrective labor colonies are a common type of prison.
- The Kingdom of Hawaii under the rule of King Kamehameha III (reigned 1825–1854) replaced the death penalty with exile, and Kahoʻolawe became a men's penal colony sometime around 1830, while Kaena Point on Lānaʻi served as the female penal colony. The law making the island a penal colony was repealed in 1853.
- Boven Digoel in Papua was once used by Dutch East Indies authorities as penal colony for revolutionaries.
- Buru Island in Indonesia was used as a penal colony during the New Order era to hold political prisoners.
- Apartheid South Africa used Robben Island as a penal colony for anti-apartheid activists.
- The Netherlands had a penal colony from the late 19th century. The Department of Justice took over the town of Veenhuizen (originally set up by a private company to "re-educate" vagrants from the large cities in the west like Amsterdam) to turn it into a collection of prison buildings. The town stands in the least populated province of Drenthe in the north of the country, isolated in the middle of a vast area of peat and marshland.
- Some sources refer to Nazi-era forced-labor camps (Arbeitslager) in German-occupied Europe as penal colonies.
- North Korea operates a penal system including prison labor camps and re-education camps.
- Tarrafal operated as a Portuguese penal colony in the Cape Verde Islands, set up in 1936 by the head of the Portuguese government, Salazar, where opponents of this right-wing regime were sent. At least 32 anarchists, communists and other opponents of Salazar's regime died in this camp. The camp closed in 1954 but re-opened in the 1970s to jail African leaders fighting Portuguese colonialism.
- Spain maintained a penal colony on Fernando Po in present-day Equatorial Guinea. The tiny island of Cabrera was also a short-lived penal colony in which approximately 7,000 French prisoners of war from the Battle of Bailén (1808) were left on their own for years; less than half of them survived.
- Taiwan had a penal colony at Green Island during Chiang Kai-shek's White Terror of 1949–1987. As of 2015, the island is a tourist destination.
- Côn Đảo Island in Vietnam was used as a penal colony both by the French colonists (from 1861 onwards) and by the Republic of Vietnam (from 1954 and during the Vietnam War of 1955–1975).
- The Ottoman Empire used Fezzan as a penal colony, because it was the most remote province from the then capital city, Istanbul.
- There are penal colonies in the Philippines, namely Iwahig Prison and Penal Farm in Palawan, and Davao Prison and Penal Farm in Davao.

== See also ==
- Alcatraz
- History of Australia
