= Augusto Roa Bastos =

Paraguayan writer (1917–2005)

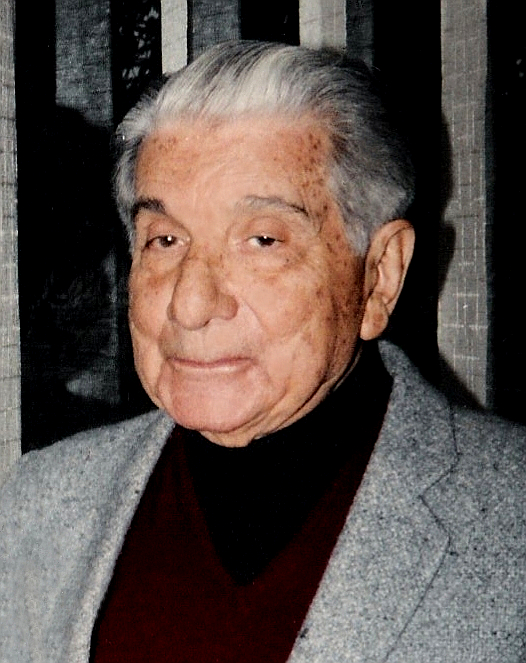
- Born: 13 June 1917; Asunción, Paraguay
- Died: 26 April 2005 (aged 87); Asunción, Paraguay
- Occupations: Writer; journalist; professor
- Writing career
- Genre: Dictator novel
- Notable work: Hijo de hombre; Yo el Supremo
- Notable awards: Miguel de Cervantes Prize (1989); National Prize for Literature (1995); Legion d'Honneur (1997)
- Literary movement: Latin American Boom

Augusto Roa Bastos (13 June 1917 – 26 April 2005) was a Paraguayan novelist and short story writer. As a teenager he fought in the Chaco War between Paraguay and Bolivia, and he later worked as a journalist, screenwriter and professor. He is best known for his complex novel Yo el Supremo (I the Supreme) and for winning the Premio Miguel de Cervantes in 1989, Spanish literature's most prestigious prize. Yo el Supremo explores the dictations and inner thoughts of José Gaspar Rodríguez de Francia, the eccentric dictator of Paraguay who ruled with an iron fist, from 1814 until his death in 1840.

Roa Bastos's life and writing were marked by experience with dictatorial military regimes. In 1947 he was forced into exile in Argentina, and in 1976 he fled Buenos Aires for France in similar political circumstances. Most of Roa Bastos's work was written in exile, but this did not deter him from fiercely tackling Paraguayan social and historical issues in his work. Writing in a Spanish that was at times heavily augmented by Guaraní words (the major Paraguayan indigenous language), Roa Bastos incorporated Paraguayan myths and symbols into a Baroque style known as magical realism. He is considered a late-comer to the Latin American Boom literary movement. Roa Bastos's canon includes the novels Hijo de hombre (1960; Son of Man) and El fiscal (1993; The Prosecutor), as well as numerous other novels, short stories, poems, and screenplays.

== Biography ==
=== Early life (1917–1932) ===
Roa Bastos was born in Asunción on 13 June 1917. He spent his childhood in Iturbe, a provincial town in the Guairá Department where his father was an administrator on a sugar plantation. It was here, some 200 kilometres (120 mi) to the south of the Paraguayan capital of Asunción, that Roa Bastos learned to speak both Spanish and Guaraní, the language of Paraguay's indigenous people. At the age of ten he was sent to school in Asunción where he stayed with his uncle, Hermenegildo Roa, the liberal bishop of Asunción.

His uncle's extensive personal library provided the young Roa Bastos with his first exposure to the classical Spanish literature of the Baroque and Renaissance traditions that he would imitate in his early poetry throughout the 1930s and 1940s. In addition, his uncle's emphasis on the mystical aspects of classic literature would have a profound Roa Bastos's later writings. His experience of Guaraní social customs and language combined with the traditional Spanish education that he received in Asunción, created a cultural and linguistic duality that would manifest itself in much of Roa Bastos's writing. His rural upbringing also exposed Roa Bastos to the exploitation and oppression of the indigenous and peasant peoples of Paraguay, which would become a prominent theme in his writing.

=== War and writing (1932–1947) ===
In 1932 the territorial Chaco War began between Paraguay and Bolivia and continued until 1935. At some point, perhaps as late as 1934, Roa Bastos joined the Paraguayan army as a medical auxiliary. The war would have a profound effect on the future writer who said: "when I left for that war I dreamed of purification in the fire of battles." Instead of glory he found "maimed bodies" and "destruction" which left him to question "why two brother countries like Bolivia and Paraguay were massacring each other", and as a consequence Roa Bastos became a pacifist.

Directly after the war he worked as a bank clerk and later as a journalist. During this time he began writing plays and poetry. In 1941 Roa Bastos won the Ateneo Paraguayo prize for Fulgencia Miranda, although the book was never published. In the early 1940s he spent significant time on the yerba mate plantations in northern Paraguay, an experience he would later draw upon in his first published novel, Hijo de hombre (1960; Son of Man). In 1942 he was appointed editorial secretary for the Asunción daily El País.

In 1944 the British Council awarded Roa Bastos a nine-month fellowship for journalism in London. During this time he traveled extensively in Britain, France and Africa and witnessed the devastation of WWII first hand. He served as the El País war correspondent, notably conducting an interview with General Charles de Gaulle after the latter's return to Paris in 1945. Roa Bastos also broadcast Latin American programs at the invitation of the BBC and France's Ministry of Information.

Throughout this eventful period in his life Roa Bastos continued to write and he was considered a poet of the Paraguayan avant garde. In 1942 he published a book of poems in the classic Spanish style, which he titled El Ruiseñor De La Aurora (The Dawn Nightingale), a work he later renounced. He also had plays successfully performed during the 1940s, though they were never published. Of his prolific poetry of the late 1940s only "El naranjal ardiente" (1960; "The Burning Orange Grove") was published.

=== Exile in Argentina (1947–1976) ===
During the 1947 Paraguayan Civil War, Roa Bastos was forced to flee to Buenos Aires, Argentina, because he had spoken out against President Higinio Moríñigo. About 500,000 of his fellow Paraguayans left for Argentina at the same time. Roa Bastos remained in Argentina until just before the establishment of the military dictatorship there in 1976, and he did not return permanently to Paraguay until 1989. He found exile difficult, but his time in Buenos Aires was a prolific period. Roa Bastos said this in reference to his exile:

I can't complain...Exile brought out in me, in addition to a revulsion against violence and against depreciation of the human condition, a feeling for the universality of man. Exile lent me perspectives from which to know my own country from other people's point of view, and from which to live for the enormity of its misfortune.

In 1953 the collection of 17 short stories El trueno entre las hojas (1953; Thunder Among the Leaves) was published and circulated internationally, but it was not until the 1960 publication of the novel Hijo de hombre (Son of Man) that Roa Bastos won major critical and popular success. The novel draws on the oppressive history of Paraguay from the rule of Dr. Jose Gaspar de Francia in the early 19th century until the Chaco War in the 1930s. Its multiple narrative perspectives and historical and political themes anticipate his most famous work, Yo el Supremo, written more than a decade later. Roa Bastos adapted Hijo de hombre into an award-winning film in the same year as its publication.

Roa Bastos further established himself as a screenwriter with the screenplay of Shunko (1960), directed by Lautaro Murúa and based on the memoirs of a country school teacher. In 1961 he once again collaborated with Murúa for Alias Gardelito (1961), which depicted the lives of urban petty criminals and became a major independent film of the nuevo cine movement. In 1974 Roa Bastos published his influential masterpiece Yo el Supremo, the result of seven years' work. When Jorge Rafael Videla's military dictatorship came to power in 1976, however, the book was banned in Argentina, and Roa Bastos was exiled once again, this time to Toulouse, France.

=== France (1976–1989) ===
In Toulouse Roa Bastos taught Guaraní and Spanish literature at the University of Toulouse. Although he had been allowed to visit Paraguay to work with a new generation of Paraguayan writers, starting in 1970, he was again barred from entry in 1982, for purportedly engaging in subversive activities. There is however, little evidence that he participated in sectarian politics of any kind. In France, Roa Bastos faced the second forced relocation of his life, but he also won a new readership for his work during this time. Helen Lane's English translation of Yo el Supremo (I the Supreme), published in 1986, was greeted with widespread acclaim in the English-speaking world. However, in France, Roa Bastos's writing focus was primarily academic, and his literary output did not match that of his time in Argentina. In 1985 Roa Bastos retired from the University of Toulouse. Following the downfall of the oppressive Alfredo Stroessner regime in 1989, Roa Bastos returned to Paraguay at the request of its new leader Andrés Rodríguez.

=== Return to Paraguay and Cervantes Prize (1989–2005) ===
Following the toppling of the Stroessner regime, Roa Bastos won the Premio Cervantes (Cervantes Prize), awarded by the Spanish Royal Academy in partnership with the Spanish government, in recognition of his outstanding contributions to Spanish-language literature. It was at this time that Roa Bastos began to travel frequently between Paraguay and France. In 1991, representing Paraguay, Roa Bastos signed The Morelia Declaration "demanding the reversal of the ecological destruction of the planet." It was at this time that Roa Bastos again became an active novelist and screenwriter.

In 1991 Roa Bastos adapted Yo, el Supremo for the screen. His first novel since Yo, el Supremo, Vigilia del almirante (1992; Vigil of the Admiral) was published in 1992, and El fiscal (1993; The Prosecutor) the following year. Although neither of his later novels had the impact of his earlier work, El fiscal is considered an important work. Roa Bastos died on 26 April 2005 in Asunción from a heart attack. He was survived by his three children, his third wife, Iris Giménez, and a reputation as one of Latin American's finest writers.

== Major works ==
=== Hijo de hombre ===
Hijo de hombre (1960; Son of Man), Roa Bastos's first published and award-winning novel, represents his definitive break with poetry. It is seen as a refined "outgrowth" of his earlier works of short fiction such as El trueno entre las hojas (1953), which also dealt with themes of political oppression and social struggle in Paraguay. This novel portrays the conflict between the governing élite and the oppressed masses in Paraguay from 1912 until just after the end of the Chaco War with Bolivia in 1936. Like his later Yo, el Supremo, Hijo de hombre draws upon a series of Paraguayan legends and stories dating back to start of Dr. Francia's dictatorship in 1814.

Hijo de hombre builds upon a system of Christian metaphors as part of the Neobaroque concept of Magic Realism, in order to examine the pain of being Paraguayan. This novel contrasts two figures: Miguel Vera and Cristóbal Jara. Vera narrates the odd chapters, although he might also be the narrator of all nine chapters (this is unclear). He is a well-to-do and educated romantic supporter of revolution, who is unable to take real action to support his ideals and in the end betrays them (not unlike Judas). Jara, on the other hand, is an uneducated "son of man" who becomes a Christ-like leader for Paraguayan people through action and strength of character. Although it was a massive critical success, Roa Bastos remained dissatisfied with the work for a number reasons. It was fourteen years before he published another novel.

=== Yo el Supremo ===
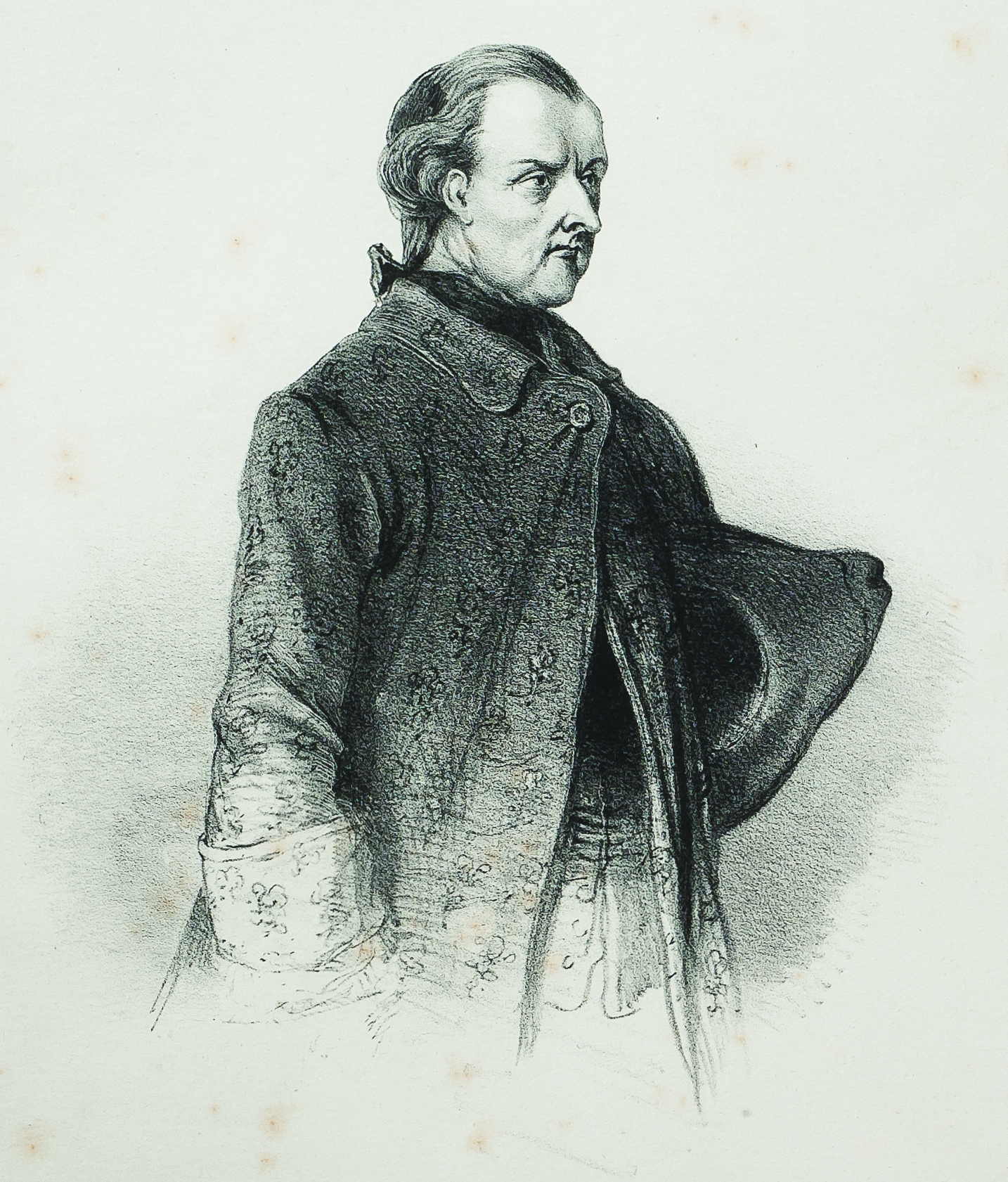
Roa Bastos portrayed the nineteenth-century Paraguayan dictator José Gaspar Rodríguez de Francia in his novel Yo el Supremo.

Yo el Supremo (I, the Supreme) is a fictionalized account of the 19th-century Paraguayan dictator José Gaspar Rodríguez de Francia, who was also known as "Dr. Francia". The book's title derives from the fact that Francia referred to himself as "El Supremo" or "The Supreme". The first in a long line of dictators, The Supreme was a severe, calculating despot. He ruled absolutely from 1814 until his death in 1840, and is a unique figure in Latin American history. The goal of his rule mirrored that of the Jesuits who had ruled Paraguay for much of its history before him: to keep the Paraguayan people and their customs pure by protecting them from the corrupting influence of European and other outside forces. In Yo el supremo, Roa Bastos is also fundamentally concerned with the power (and the weakness) of writing itself: its plot revolves around the dictator's efforts to uncover who has been forging his signature on a series of pasquinades discovered around the capital, and his relationship with his secretary, Patiño, to whom he dictates his thoughts and orders, but whom he never fully trusts.

The novel itself is "an exceptional cultural phenomenon". It has been suggested that it "[is] more immediately and unanimously acclaimed than any novel since One Hundred Years of Solitude, [and the] strictly historical importance [may] be even greater than that of García Márquez's fabulously successful creation". Yo el Supremo has contributed widely to a number of different genres and styles. It belongs to the genre of novelas de dictadores or dictator novels, and also to the Latin American Boom, a literary movement of the 1960s and 1970s. Yo el Supremo is also an important milestone in the evolution of the historical novel genre. "Yo el Supremo weaves a plethora of formats into a single work: history, novel, sociological essay, moral philosophy, biographical novel, revolutionary pamphlet, testimonial documentary, poetic prose, autobiographic confession, ideological debate over literary limits, and linguistic treatise on the limits of verbal expression".

=== El Fiscal ===
El Fiscal (1993; The Prosecutor) is the third novel of the trilogy written by Augusto Roa Bastos. These three works contemplate what the author has termed "the monotheism of power". The Prosecutor explores the atrocities of the Alfredo Stroessner dictatorship in Paraguay, which lasted from 1954 to 1989. The novel links the protagonist to Paraguay's past as he struggles to give meaning to his life by assassinating the dictator and freeing the Paraguayan people. Combining autobiography, detective fiction, historical novel and philosophy, the novel examines the question of whether one man has the right to judge another. Helene Carol Weldt-Basson's translation was published in 2018 (Fairleigh Dickinson University Press; Annotated edition (20 February 2018)); she is professor of Spanish and Latin American literature at University of North Dakota.

== Precursors and influences ==
Ruy Díaz de Guzmán's Anales del descubrimiento, población y conquista del Río de la Plata is considered one of the most important antecedents to Roa Bastos's writings. Guzmán, a Paraguayan explorer of Guaraní and Spanish heritage, wrote extensively about the geography of Paraguay using mythical descriptions of the landscape and the Guaraní language. The most important precursor to Roa Bastos, however, is Rafael Barrett (1876–1910), whose writings incorporated many of the important themes and writings styles that Roa Bastos would later master including: Spanish-Guaraní bilingualism, magic realism, the revision of Paraguayan history, social literature, exploration of collective memory and the universe of poetic symbols. Barrett's essay "Lo que son los yerbales" is a severe critique of the exploitation of workers on yerba mate tea plantations. Roa Bastos spent part of the early 1940s documenting this same issue and there is much speculation about the role of "Lo que son los yerbales" in the creation of his first major novel Hijo de hombre. The Uruguayan writer Horacio Quiroga is another important predecessor.

== Style ==
Roa Bastos was an exponent of the Neobaroque style that brought Latin American literature to the fore internationally in the mid-20th century. Among others, the Chilean poet Pablo Neruda is also associated with this school of writing. The style uses a complex system of metaphors that are often very closely tied to the land, flora and culture of the particular writer, especially in the case of Roa Bastos. Magic realism is a Neobaroque concept that applies such systems of metaphor to otherwise realistic settings (Yo, el Supremo being a notable example of the form). The Neobaroque style was used by many Paraguayan writers in exile after 1947 and until the 1980s. At the core of much of the work from this group are ideas of political freedom and the emancipation of their homeland.

Roa Bastos started out writing poetry in the Spanish Renaissance and Baroque traditions. Later he took on "a new sensibility" in response to the poetry of Valle-Inclán, Juan Ramón Jiménez, and García Lorca. However, it is as a prose-fiction writer Roa Bastos has built his considerable reputation, through his novels and numerous short stories. Roa Bastos's novels blend the present and past by creating scenes with myths from pre-colonial times and Christian legends, developing a special kind of Magic Realism, although there are significant stylistic variations between his major novels.

== Themes ==
=== Paraguay: collective memory ===
The majority of Roa Bastos's work was written in exile owing to the oppressive political condition of his country, at a time when Paraguay was one of the least culturally, economically, and politically developed countries in Latin America. Thus, much of Roa Bastos's important writing is an attempt to "capture the tragic essence, the 'inner weakness' as well as the inner strength of his country's people." His work reveals an intense preoccupation not only with contemporary Paraguay but with its history, looking back to the beginning of the 19th century and the rule of Dr. Gaspar de Francia (whose life is the focus of Yo, el Supremo). While key historical figures and events interest Roa Bastos, it is the impact of these "socio-historical roots" on "the nature of the masses" that forms the central theme of his literary work.

His writing deploys symbols and multiple narratives that build on the collective memory of the Paraguayan people. Hijo de hombre, for example, constructs an "alternative history of popular movements" out of the people's recollections and symbols. The intertextual novel Yo, el Supremo is particularly representative of this technique, both in its construction and narrative. In El Fiscal (1993), a third novel about the abuses of political power—this time focusing on Stroessner's régime—Roa Bastos again offers an alternative to the accepted versions of events in Paraguay and challenges "the intelligibility of history". To this end he weaves elements of fantasy and metafiction into his narratives.

=== Humanism and the engaged writer ===
Roa Bastos believed that it was the role of the writer to directly engage in the interpretation of both contemporary and historical events. Rather than be the objective "chronicler", he thought the writer should engage morally with the social problems depicted in the writing. According to Roa Bastos, ”literary activity has come to signify the necessity for facing up to a destiny, the will to enlist in the vital reality of a collectivity, in its true moral context and social structure, in the complex relationships of a contemporary reality – that is to say, by projecting themselves toward a universal world of man.” Thus, one of the major themes in the writing of Roa Bastos is a deep and universal humanism, with a particular focus on suffering.

Undoubtedly, Roa Bastos's own experiences played a significant role in his emphasis on human suffering. As a young man he fought in the Chaco war between Bolivia and Paraguay, an event he portrayed in Hijo de hombre. Later he saw the devastation of WWII at first hand in Europe, the violent strife of 1947 in Paraguay, and the rise of the Argentinian military dictatorship in 1976. His collection of short stories published in 1953, El Trueno entre las Hojas, set the stage for Hijo de hombre and Yo, el Supremo with its dark portrayal of devastating political struggle and oppression. Two decades later, Yo, el Supremo was published, providing a prime example of Roa Bastos's idea of the engaged writer. It offered an unflattering, fictionalized account of the final thoughts and ramblings of Paraguay's first dictator, at a time when Paraguay was under the stranglehold of a regime that adopted many of the same policies of oppression and isolationism. Roa Bastos was not alone in using literature to engage in contemporary events during the Latin American Boom period. In the 1960s and 1970s, Gabriel Garcia Marquez and others adopted the same approach. Together, these writers created the Dictator novel genre.

=== Bilingualism ===
As is customary for most Paraguayans of peasant or working class origins, Roa Bastos learned to speak Spanish and Guaraní from birth. Both Spanish and Guaraní are the official languages of Paraguay (the latter is primarily an oral language). Although Guaraní remains the "popular" language spoken at home and on the "street", Spanish is the language of official business and of power. The preservation and widespread use of an indigenous language after centuries of European immigration is unique in Latin America, and Guarani remains a symbol of Paraguayan nationalism and an "important vehicle for interpreting the country's reality". This is the legacy of the Jesuits who ruled Paraguay in the 18th century and used Guarani (instead of Spanish or Latin) to spread Christianity throughout Paraguay.

While Roa Bastos wrote primarily in Spanish, the interplay between these two languages is an essential part of his style. His bilingualism gives Roa Bastos a much greater range of language to work with, but also creates tension between an internationally recognized language and one that is obscure and fiercely Paraguayan. Roa Bastos has described the relationship between the two languages as "an almost schizophrenic split not only on communicational levels of the spoken language, but also and quite particularly in the literary language."

== Honors and distinctions ==
Over the course of his career, Roa Bastos received a diversity of honors and distinctions. In 1941 he won the Ateneo Paraguayo Prize for his (unpublished) novel Fulgencio Miranda. This first award was followed by a British Council fellowship for journalism that enabled him to travel to Europe during World War II. In 1959 Roa Bastos won the Losada prize for his first published novel Hijo de hombre. The adaptation of this novel, for which he wrote the screenplay, won best film in the Spanish language and first prize of the Argentine Instituto de Cinematografia the following year. His most prestigious awards include two John Guggenheim Foundation Fellowships, awarded in 1970 and 1979, and the Cervantes Prize, an award given by the Spanish government for lifetime achievement, and Spanish language literature's most prestigious prize, which he received in 1989. Roa Bastos donated most of his prize money to provide easier access to books in Paraguay. In 1995, he received Paraguay's National Prize for Literature. In 1997 France distinguished him as Chevalier of the Legion d'Honneur.

== Legacy ==
The writing of Roa Bastos spans four countries, six decades, and countless genres. In his lifetime he made important contributions to Latin American Boom writing, to the related Dictator Novel, and to the Nuevo Cine film movement through screenplays like Alias Gardelito (1961). Roa Bastos's influence can be found in the works of many foreign post-boom writers, including Mempo Giardinelli, Isabel Allende, Eraclio Zepeda, Antonio Skármeta, Saul Ibargoyen, and Luisa Valenzuela. The most important author to come out of Paraguay, he also remains highly influential for a new generation of Paraguayan authors. Roa Bastos's relationship with his country, unbroken by over 40 years of exile, was considered so important that in 1989 he was invited back by Paraguay's new president, Andrés Rodríguez, following the collapse of the Stroessner regime.

Even before Yo el Supremo, Roa Bastos was considered part of "the pantheon of great writers" by some critics due to Hijo de hombre. However, it was the former work that cemented his place as a significant literary figure. According to Juan Manuel Marcos, Yo el Supremo "anticipates many of the post-boom writing techniques" such as "the carnivalization of historical discourse, transtextualization, and parody". Mexican literary great Carlos Fuentes has called Yo el Supremo one of the milestones in Latin American literature. While his reputation rests on his novels, Roa Bastos's achievements in film, creative writing, and journalism add further substance to his legacy.

== Published works ==
=== Novels ===
- Hijo de hombre (1960; Son of Man)
- Yo el Supremo (1974; I the Supreme)
- Vigilia del Almirante (1992; Vigil of the Admiral)
- El fiscal (1993; The Prosecutor)
- Contravida (1994; Counterlife)

=== Short fiction ===
- El trueno entre las hojas (1953; Thunder Among the Leaves)
- El baldío (1966; Vacant Ground)
- Madera quemada (1967; Burnt Wood)
- Los pies sobre el agua (1967; The Feet on the Water)
- Moriencia (1969; Slaughter)
- Cuerpo presente y otros cuentos (1971; Present Body and other stories)
- El pollito de fuego (The Fire Chick) (1974)
- Los Congresos (The Congresses) (1974)
- El sonámbulo (The Sleepwalker) (1976)
- Lucha hasta el alba (Struggle until Dawn) (1979)
- Los Juegos (1979; The Games)
- Contar un cuento, y otros relatos (1984; To Tell a Tale and Other Stories)
- Madama Sui (Madame Sui) (1996)
- Metaforismos (Metaphorisms) (1996)
- La tierra sin mal (1998; Land Without Evil)

=== Screenplays ===
- Thunder Among the Leaves (1958)
- Sabaleros (1959)
- The blood and the seed (1959)
- Shunko (1960)
- Alias Gardelito (1961)
- Thirst / Son of man (1961)
- The last floor (1962)
- The terrorist (1962)
- The demon in the blood (1963)
- La Boda ("The Wedding") (1964)
- The harvest (1965)
- Punishment to the traitor (1965)
- The President (1966)
- The town already has a commissar (1967)
- Soluna (1967)
- La Madre María (1974)

=== Poetry ===
- El ruiseñor de la aurora, y otros poemas (1942; The Dawn Nightingale, and other poems) *Written in 1936
- "El naranjal ardiente" (1960; "The Burning Orange Grove") *Written between 1947 and 1949

=== Other writings ===
- Cándido Lopez (1976)
- Imagen y perspectivas de la narrativa latinoamericana actual (1979)
- Lucha hasta el alba (1979)
- Rafael Barrett y la realidad paraguaya a comienzos del siglo (1981)
- El tiranosaurio del Paraguay da sus últimas boqueadas (1986)
- Carta abierta a mi pueblo (1986)
- El texto cautivo: el escritor y su obra (1990)
- Mis reflexiones sobre el guión de "Hijo de hombre" (1993)

=== Compilations and anthologies ===
- Antología personal (1980; Personal Anthology)

=== Translations ===
- Hijo de hombre as Son of Man (1965) Rachel Caffyn
- Yo el Supremo as I, the Supreme (1986) Helen Lane
- El Fiscal as The Prosecutor (2018) Helene Carol Weldt-Basson

== Sources ==
- Bach, Caleb (November–December 1996), "Augusto Roa Bastos: Outwitting Reality", Americas, 48 (6).
- Barnard, Timothy; Rist, Peter, eds. (1996), South American Cinema: A Critical Filmography, 1915–1994, New York: Garland, ISBN 978-0-8240-4574-6.
- Caistor, Nick (28 April 2005), "Obituary: Augusto Roa Bastos", The Guardian.
- De Costa, Elena (1997), "Caudillismo and Dictatorship", in Smith, Verity (ed.), Encyclopedia of Latin American Literature, London: Fitzroy Dearborn, pp. 185–186, ISBN 978-1-884964-18-3.
- Flores, Angel, ed. (1992), "Augusto Roa Bastos", Spanish American Authors: The Twentieth Century, New York: H.W. Wilson Company, pp. 736–740, ISBN 978-0-8242-0806-6.
- Foster, David William (1969), The Myth of Paraguay in the Fiction of Augusto Roa Bastos, Chapel Hill: University of South Carolina Press, OCLC 35264.
- Foster, David William (1978), Augusto Roa Bastos, Boston: Twayne, ISBN 0-8057-6348-1.
- Franco, Jean (1994), An Introduction to Spanish American Literature, Cambridge: Cambridge University Press, ISBN 978-0-521-44923-6.
- Fuentes, Carlos (6 April 1986), "A Despot, Now and Forever. Review of I, the Supreme", New York Times.
- Hoyt Williams, John (1979), The Rise and Fall of the Paraguayan Republic, Austin: University of Texas Press, ISBN 978-0-292-77017-1.
- King, John (August 1983), "Profile: Augusto Roa Bastos", Index on Censorship, 12 (4): 15–17, doi:10.1080/03064228308533562, S2CID 148379346.
- Levinson, Brett (2002), The Ends of Literature: The Latin American Boom in the Neoliberal Marketplace, Palo Alto, CA: Stanford University Press, ISBN 978-0-8047-4346-4.
- Lewis, Tracy K. (1997a), "Lo que son los yerbales: Essay by Rafael Barrett", in Smith, Verity (ed.), Encyclopedia of Latin American Literature, London: Fitzroy Dearborn, pp. 101–102, ISBN 978-1-884964-18-3.
- Lewis, Tracy K. (1997b), "Augusto Roa Bastos 1917–: Paraguayan prose writer, poet, dramatist", in Smith, Verity (ed.), Encyclopedia of Latin American Literature, London: Fitzroy Dearborn, pp. 716–717, ISBN 978-1-884964-18-3.
- Marcos, Juan Manuel (1989), "Augusto Roa Bastos", in Solé, Carlos; Abreu, María Isabel (eds.), Latin American Writers, vol. 3, New York: Scribner, pp. 1209–1213, ISBN 978-0-684-18463-0.
- Marcos, Juan Manuel (1992), "Paraguay", in Foster, David William (ed.), Handbook of Latin American Literature, vol. Second Edition, London: Garland, pp. 469–491, ISBN 978-0-8153-0343-5.
- Martin, Gerald (1989), Journeys through the Labyrinth: Latin American Fiction in the Twentieth Century, London: Verso, ISBN 978-0-86091-952-0.
- Mendez-Faith, Theresa (1997), "Paraguay: 19th- and 20th-Century Prose, Poetry, And Literature in Guaraní", in Smith, Verity (ed.), Encyclopedia of Latin American Literature, London: Fitzroy Dearborn, pp. 619–624, ISBN 978-1-884964-18-3.
- Ryan, Bryan, ed. (1991), "ROA BASTOS, Augusto (Antonio) 1917–", Hispanic Writers: A Selection of Sketches from Contemporary Authors, Detroit: Gale Research, pp. 403–405, ISBN 978-0-8103-7688-5.
- Seymour-Smith, Martin (1985), The New Guide to Modern World Literature, New York: Peter Bedrick, ISBN 978-0-87226-000-9.
- Shaw, Donald Leslie (2002), A Companion to Modern Spanish American Fiction, Woodbridge, UK: Boydell and Brewer, ISBN 978-1-85566-078-6.
- Tobia, Luis Martel (1997), "The Historical Novel", in Smith, Verity (ed.), Encyclopedia of Latin American Literature, London: Fitzroy Dearborn, pp. 422–423, ISBN 978-1-884964-18-3.
- Ward, Philip (1978), The Oxford Companion to Spanish Literature, Oxford: Clarendon, ISBN 978-0-19-866114-6.
- Wood, Michael (1996), "Spanish America", in Sturrock, John (ed.), The Oxford Guide to Contemporary World Literature, Oxford: Oxford University Press, ISBN 978-0-19-283318-1.
- Premio Nacional de Literatura 1995 [1995 National Prize for Literature] (in Spanish), Cultural Center of the Republic.
