= José Gaspar Rodríguez de Francia =

Dictator of Paraguay from 1814 to 1840

José Rodríguez de Francia
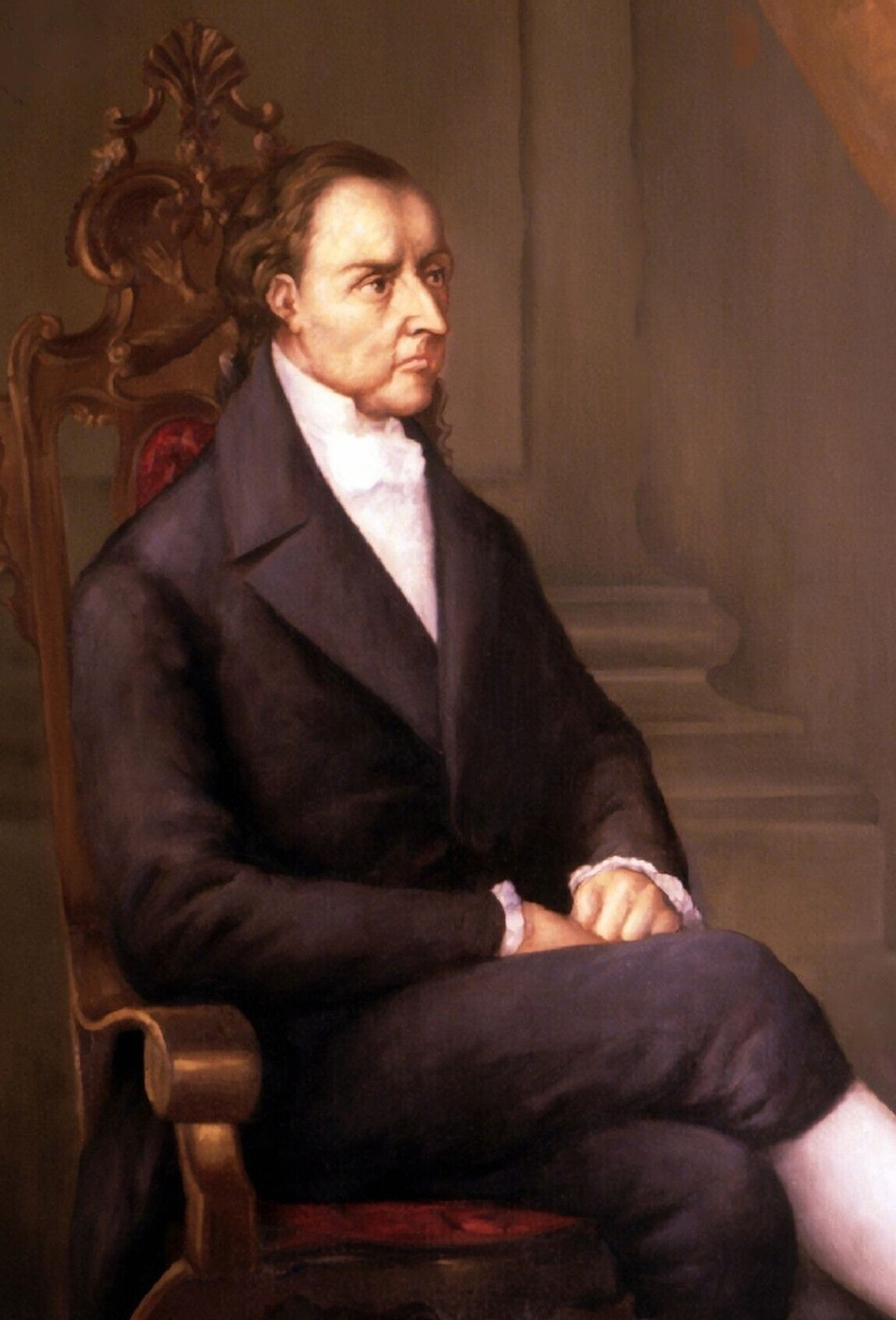

Supreme and Perpetual Dictator of Paraguay
- In office 12 June 1814 – 20 September 1840
- Preceded by: Fulgencio Yegros (as Consul)
- Succeeded by: Manuel Antonio Ortiz

Consul of Paraguay
- In office 12 October 1813 – 12 February 1814
- Preceded by: Fulgencio Yegros
- Succeeded by: Fulgencio Yegros

Personal details
- Born: 6 January 1766 Yaguarón, Governorate of Paraguay
- Died: 20 September 1840 (aged 74) Asunción, Paraguay
- Education: National University of Córdoba

José Gaspar Rodríguez de Francia y Velasco (Note: Spanish pronunciation: [xoˈse ɣasˈpaɾ roˈðɾiɣes ðe ˈfɾansia]) (6 January 1766 – 20 September 1840), also known as Doctor Francia or to Paraguayans of his time as Karai Guasu, (Note: in Guaraní, means "Great Lord")) was a lawyer, politician, statesman and the first dictator (1814–1840) of Paraguay following its 1811 independence from the Spanish Viceroyalty of the Río de la Plata. His official title was "Supreme and Perpetual Dictator of Paraguay", but he was popularly known as El Supremo.

He was the political leader of the faction that advocated for the full independence of Paraguay from the United Provinces of the Río de la Plata and from the Empire of Brazil. Under his dictatorship, he isolated Paraguay from the external world.

== Early life and education ==
Francia was born in Yaguarón, in the modern-day department of Paraguarí. Francia's father was a tobacco planter from São Paulo, and his mother was a Paraguayan descended from Spanish colonists. He was christened Joseph Gaspar de Franza y Velasco but later used the more popular name Rodríguez, and changed Franza to the more Spanish Francia. Although his father was simply García Rodríguez Francia (Portuguese: Garcia Rodrigues França), the dictator inserted the article de to style himself "Rodríguez de Francia y Velasco".

He began his studies at the monastery school of San Francisco in Asunción, originally in training for the Catholic priesthood, but never became a priest. On 13 April 1785, he earned a degree in theology and philosophy from the National University of Córdoba in what would soon become Argentina. During his studies, he was influenced by the ideas from the Age of Enlightenment and the French Revolution, and he was an avid reader of Voltaire, Rousseau, and the Encyclopédistes.

Despite rumors that his father was a mulatto, Francia was awarded a position in the department of theology at the Royal Seminary of San Carlos in Asunción in 1790. His radical views made his position as a teacher there untenable, and he soon gave up theology to study law. Eventually, he became a lawyer and learned five languages: Guarani, Spanish, French, Latin, and some English. Francia was disgusted by the Spanish colonial casta system, and he defended the less fortunate against the affluent. His interest in astronomy and his knowledge of the French language and other subjects considered arcane in Asunción caused some Paraguayans to regard him as a wizard who could predict the future.

== Political career ==
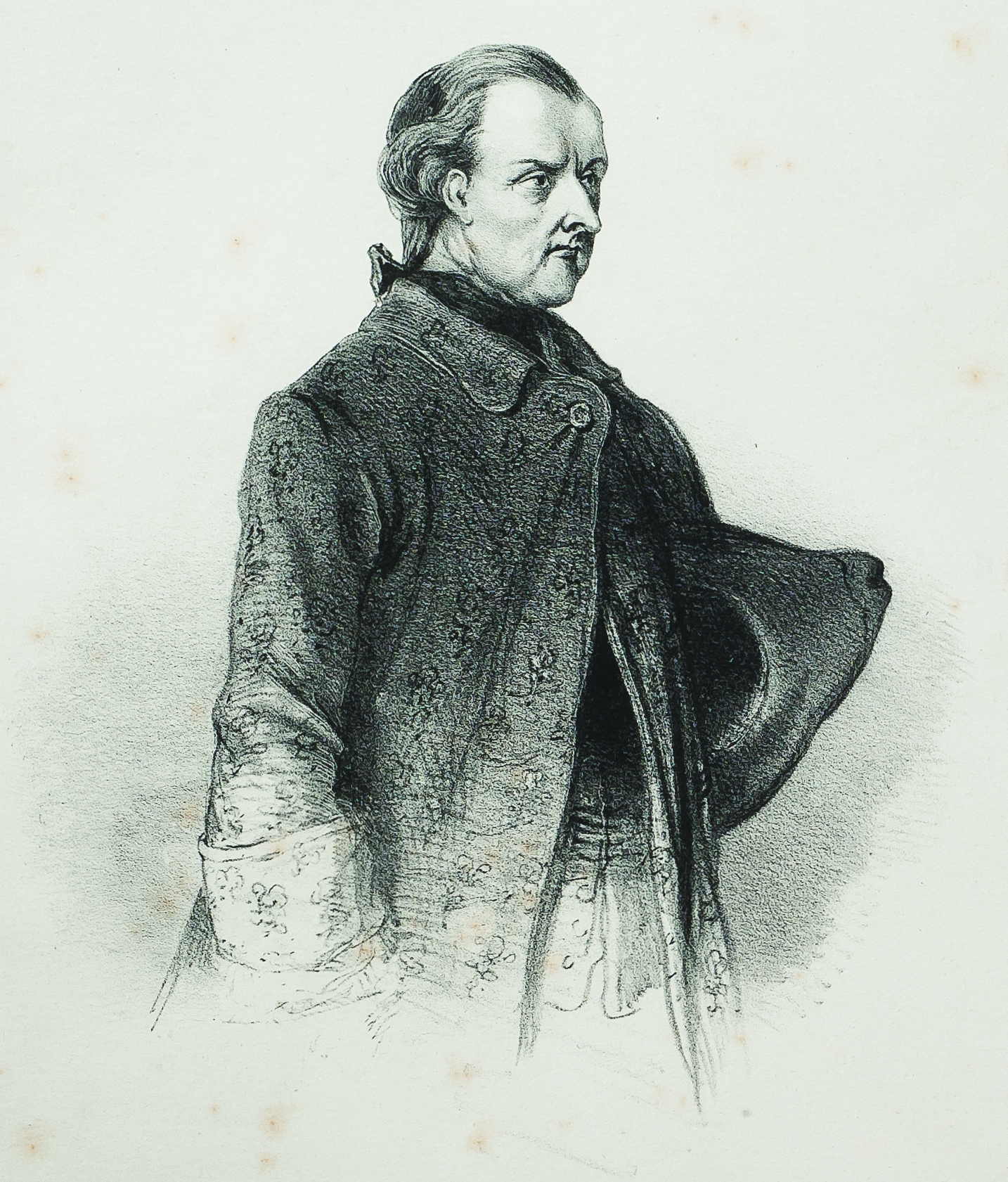
Depiction of José Gaspar Rodríguez de Francia.

He demonstrated an early interest in politics. He became a member of the provincial cabildo in 1807, fiscal officer in 1808 and attained the position of head of the cabildo of Asunción — the highest position to which he could aspire as a criollo — by August 1809. Other significant members included Fulgencio Yegros; Pedro Juan Caballero; Manuel Atanasio Cabañas; and the last colonial governor, Bernardo de Velasco.

After the May Revolution in Buenos Aires, Governor Velasco convened the Congress of the province on 24 July 1810. Francia shocked the other members by saying that which king they had was irrelevant. When Paraguay's independence was declared on 15 May 1811, he was appointed secretary of the three-man ruling junta and included in the five-man governing junta by Congress meeting on 17 June 1811. On 1 August, he resigned because of the army's dominance over Congress. He retired to the countryside, where he spread rumors that the country was going to be betrayed by the incompetent government. He was one of the few men in the country with any significant education and soon became the country's de facto leader. Only one other Paraguayan had a doctorate: Juan Bogarín, one of the five junta members.

From his retirement in his modest chacra (farm or country estate) near Asunción, he told ordinary citizens that their revolution had been betrayed, the change in government had only traded a Spanish-born elite for a criollo one, and the government was incompetent and mismanaged. He returned to the junta in October after Bogarín was removed and resigned again on 15 December. He did not return until 16 November 1812, and then only when he was in charge of foreign policy and half of the army.

Paraguayans often referred to him simply as "Dr. Francia" or Karai Guasu ("great lord" in Guarani). A few Indians believed that he had supernatural powers: when some saw him measuring the stars with his theodolite, they thought he was talking to demons. On 1 October 1813, Congress named Francia and Fulgencio Yegros as alternate consuls for a year. Francia was given an initial term of four months. Francia's initial term was followed by a four-month term for Yegros, which was then followed by a second four-month term for Francia. Each consul controlled half of the army. On 12 October 1813, Paraguay declared independence from the Spanish Empire.

In the 19th Century, the Spanish, the Paraguayan-born and the porteños (those of Buenos Aires) fought for control of Paraguay. The Napoleonic Wars took its toll on Spain. That led Dr. José Gaspar Rodríguez de Francia to take control of Paraguay on May 14, 1811. He served as its first president and ruled until 1840.

=== Marriage law ===
In March 1814, Francia imposed a law that no Spaniard might intermarry with another Spaniard, and that they might marry only mestizos, Amerindians, or Africans. This was done to eliminate any socioeconomic disparities along racial lines, and also to end the predominantly criollo and peninsulare influence in Paraguay. De Francia himself was not a mestizo, but feared that racial disparities would create tensions that could threaten his absolute rule.

=== Dictator ===
On 1 October 1814, Congress named him as sole consul, with absolute powers for three years. He consolidated his power to such an extent that on 1 June 1816, another Congress voted him absolute control over the country for life. For the next 24 years, he ran the country with the aid of only three other people. According to the historian Richard Alan White, the congresses were actually very progressive for the era; all men over 23 could vote for them. From 1817, he appointed cabildo members, but in 1825, he decided to end the cabildo.

== 1820 uprising and police state ==
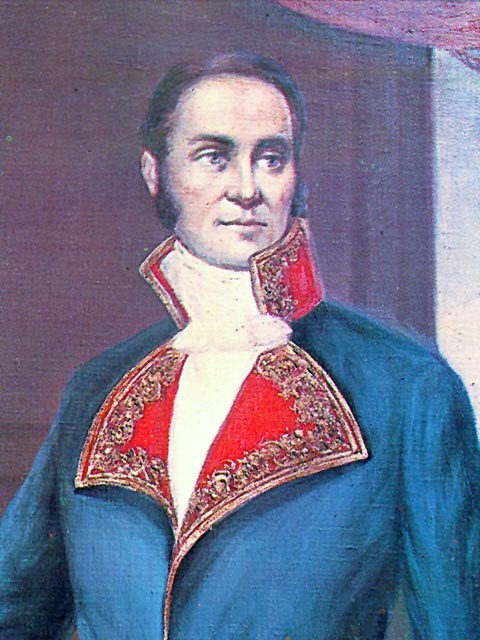
Fulgencio Yegros, first Consul of Paraguay and Francia's nemesis

In February 1820, Francia's political police, called the Pyraguës ("hairy feet"), uncovered and quickly crushed a plot by the elites and many leading independence figures to assassinate him. Juan Bogarin, the only conspirator who was still free, confessed the plot to his priest and then Francia. Almost 200 prominent Paraguayans were arrested by Francia, who executed most of them. On 9 June 1821, a letter detailing an anti-Francia conspiracy was found by two slaves and Francia's priest, who had knowledge of the plot from the confessions of a conspirator. Francia had all 200 Spaniards arrested and made them stand in the plaza while he read the letter out. They were released 18 months later only when they had paid 150,000 pesos (by comparison, the 1820 budget was 164,723 pesos). The arch-conspirators, Fulgencio Yegros and Pedro Caballero, were arrested and imprisoned for life. Caballero committed suicide on 13 July 1821, and Yegros was executed four days later.

Francia outlawed all opposition and established a secret police force. His underground prison was known as the "chamber of truth", and most of Paraguay's manufactures were made with prison labor. He abolished flogging, but his implementation of the death penalty was brutal, as he insisted all executions be carried out at a banquillo ("stool") under an orange tree outside his window. To avoid wasting bullets, most victims were bayoneted, and their families were not allowed to collect the corpses until they had been lying there all day to make sure that they were dead.

Many prisoners were also banished to Tevego, a prison camp 70 miles (110 km) away from any other settlements, surrounded by a large swamp on the east, and by the Gran Chaco desert on the west. Upon his death, there were 606 prisoners in Paraguay's jails, who were mainly foreigners.

In 1821, Francia ordered the arrest and imprisonment of the famous French botanist and explorer Aimé Bonpland, who was running a private farm harvesting Yerba mate on the banks of the Paraná, which was seen to be a threat to the Paraguayan economy. Francia later granted Bonpland clemency because of his value as a physician and allowed him to live in a house if he acted as a doctor to the local garrison.

== Policies ==
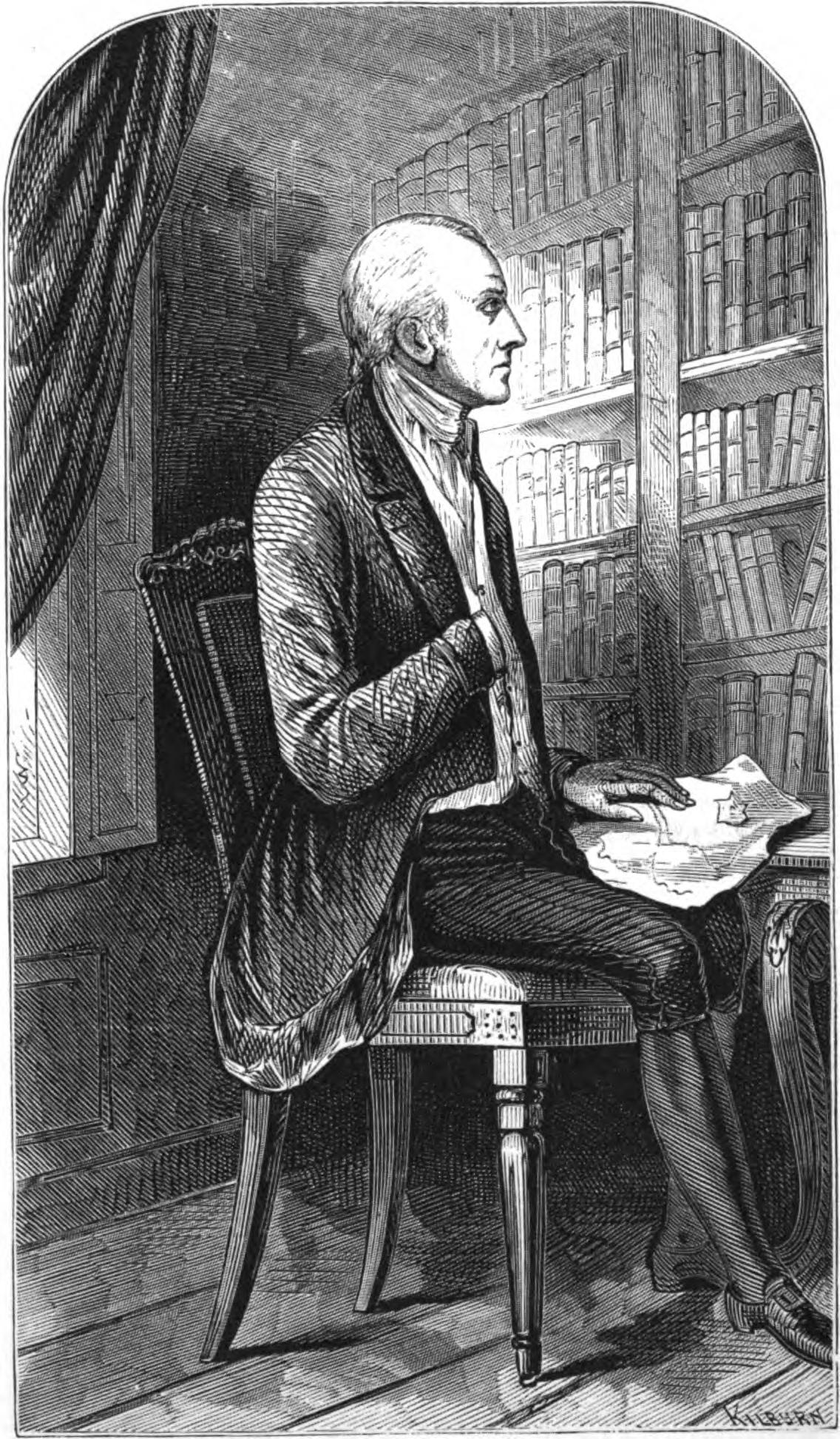
Dr. Francia

One Latin American scholar, Antonio de la Cova, summarised Francia's rule as follows:

"... we find a strange mixture of capacity and caprice, of far-sighted wisdom and reckless infatuation, strenuous endeavours after a high ideal and flagrant violations of the simplest principles of justice. He cut off Paraguay from the rest of the world by stopping foreign commerce, but carefully fostered its internal industries and agriculture under his personal supervision. Dr. Francia disposed to be hospitable to strangers from other lands, and kept them prisoners for years; lived a life of republican simplicity, and severely punished the slightest want of respect. As time went on he appears to have grown more arbitrary and despotic. Deeply imbued with the principles of the French Revolution, he was a stern antagonist of the church. He abolished the Inquisition, suppressed the college of theology, did away with the tithes, and inflicted endless indignities on the priests. He kept the aristocracy in subjection and discouraged marriage both by precept and example, leaving behind him several illegitimate children. For the extravagances of his later years the plea of insanity has been put forward."

Francia aimed to found a society on the principles of Rousseau's Social Contract and was also inspired by Robespierre and Napoleon. To create such a utopia, he imposed a ruthless isolation upon Paraguay, interdicting all external trade, and he fostered national industries.

Francia in some ways resembles the caudillos of the post-colonial era, but he deviated from the elitist tendencies of most of his contemporaries. Instead, he attempted to reorganize Paraguay in accordance with the wishes of the lower classes and other marginalized groups. He greatly limited the power of the Church and the landed elites in favor of giving peasants a way to make a living on state-run estancias. He is criticized by some scholars for being entirely against the Church, he wanted only to diminish the institution's all-encompassing political control. He actually built new churches and supported religious festivals using state funds. Francia's government also took over services usually under church supervision, such as orphanages, hospitals, and homeless shelters, to manage them more efficiently. Francia and his policies were in fact very well received by the majority of Paraguayans, excluding the small ruling classes, and his neutrality in foreign affairs kept peace in a period of turmoil.

Francia's authoritarian regime built the foundations of a strong and dirigiste state in order to undertake the economic modernization of the country.

Appointed Supremo Dictador in 1813, Francia centralized power through strict authoritarian measures, imprisoning opponents, confiscating property, and building a substantial army and bureaucracy. He also implemented taxation via public land leases and established widespread administrative control across the territory, strengthening borders and public services. By 1840, these measures had made Paraguay one of the most organized states in the region, laying the foundations for the reforms of his successors

Paraguay thus instituted rigorous protectionism at a time when most other countries were adopting the free-trade system promoted by the United Kingdom while entrusting their national bourgeoisie with the task of piloting wealth creation. This model, continued after Francia's death by his successors Carlos Antonio López and Francisco Solano López, made Paraguay one of the most modern and socially advanced countries in Latin America: the redistribution of wealth was so great that many foreign travelers reported that the country had no begging, hunger or conflict. The agrarian reform allowed for a fairly equitable distribution of land. Asunción was one of the first capitals on the continent to inaugurate a railroad network. The country had a growing industry and a merchant fleet made up of ships built in national shipyards, had a trade surplus and was debt-free.

=== Military ===
Francia believed the states of Latin America should form a confederation based on equality of nations and joint defence. He created a small but well-equipped army, which was equipped largely with the confiscated Jesuit arsenal. The size of the army varied compared to the magnitude of the threat. In 1824, for example, the army had over 5,500 troops, but in 1834, it had only 649. Francia deliberately misled foreigners into thinking that the army was over 5,000 strong, but it rarely exceeded 2,000. He maintained a large militia of 15,000 reservists. The first Paraguayan-built warship was launched in 1815, and by the mid-1820s, a navy of 100 canoes, sloops and flatboats had been built. People had to remove their hats when meeting any soldier, and Indians who could not afford headgear wore nothing but a hat brim so that they could obey this rule. Cash could be exported only in exchange for arms and ammunition, and in 1832, 2000 muskets and sabres were imported from Brazil.

No wars were fought, but there were disputes over Candelaria with Argentina. Francia initially abandoned it in 1815, but in 1821, he built a fort on the border, another the next year, and a third in 1832. In 1838, the army again occupied Candelaria on the grounds that Francia was protecting the native Guaraní people who lived there.

Paraguayan soldiers saw action only on the outposts of the frontier, which frequently came under attack from the Guaycurú. In 1823, Francia allowed Brazilian merchants to trade in Candelaria. Francia would spend most of the state's budget on the army, but soldiers were also used for labour on public projects.

=== Education ===
Francia abolished higher education on the grounds that it was the nation's financial priority to fund the army and that private study could be freely conducted in his library. Francia closed the country's only religious seminary in 1822, mainly because of the bishop's mental illness but also because of his purge of the power of the Church. Nevertheless, he made state education compulsory for all males in 1828, but he neither helped nor hindered private schools. However, illiteracy decreased, and the pupil-teacher ratio grew, with one teacher to 36 pupils by 1825, according to Richard Alan White. In 1836, Francia opened Paraguay's first public library, which was stocked with books confiscated from his opponents. Books were one of the few duty-free items, munitions being another.

=== Agriculture ===
In October 1820, a plague of locusts destroyed most of the crops. Francia ordered a second harvest planted. It proved abundant and so from then on, Paraguay's farmers planted two crops a year. Throughout the decade, Francia nationalised half the land in four stages. He started by confiscating the lands of traitors and continued with those of clerics (1823) and squatters (1825) and finally unused land (1828). The land was run directly by soldiers to make their own supplies, or it was leased to the peasants. By 1825, Paraguay was self-sufficient in sugarcane, and wheat was introduced. At the end of his life, Francia ruthlessly confined all cattle at Itapúa to stop a plague spreading from Argentina until it died out.

=== Refugees ===
Contrary to popular belief, Paraguay was not completely isolated. Francia welcomed political refugees from various countries. José Artigas, the hero of Uruguay's independence, was given asylum in 1820, along with 200 of his men. Artigas stayed in Paraguay even after Francia's death on a pension of $30 a month and was pursued by Francisco Ramírez, who saw one of his warships also desert to Paraguay. In 1820, Francia ordered for runaway slaves to be given refuge and for refugees from Corrientes to be given canoes and land. In 1839, a whole company of Brazilian deserters was welcomed. Many ex-slaves were also sent to guard the penal colony of Tevego.

=== Relationship with the Catholic Church ===
Francia inherited the Patronato Real (Royal Patronage) powers from the Spanish Empire, which was originally given to colonial viceroys and governors. He used the Patronato in severely controlling every aspect of the Catholic Church in Paraguay; however, there is no evidence nor tangible proof that Francia provoked a schism with the Pope. At most, Paraguay's isolation, forced both by external pressures and by Francia himself, made it very difficult for the Holy See to establish communications with priests of the country.

Taking the prerogatives of the Patronato to an extreme, in mid-June 1816 Francia banned all nighttime processions except that of Corpus Christi. In 1819, the bishop was persuaded to transfer authority to the vicar-general, and in 1820, friars were secularised. On 4 August 1820, all clergy were forced to swear allegiance to the state, and their clerical immunities were withdrawn. The four monasteries in the country were nationalised in 1824, with one later demolished and another becoming a parish church. The remaining two became an artillery park and barracks, and three convents also became barracks.

== Personal life ==
Francia took several precautions against assassination. He would lock the palace doors himself, unroll the cigars that his sister made to ensure there was no poison, prepare his own yerba mate, and sleep with a pistol under his pillow. Even so, a maid tried to poison him with a piece of cake. No one could come within six paces of him or even bear a cane near him. Whenever he would go out riding, he had all bushes and trees along the route uprooted so that assassins could not hide, all shutters had to be closed, and pedestrians had to prostrate before him as he passed.

Francia lived a spartan lifestyle, and apart from some books and furniture, his only possessions were a tobacco case and a pewter confectionery box. Francia left the state treasury with at least twice as much money in it as when he took office, including 36,500 pesos of his unspent salary, the equivalent of several years' pay.

The final chapter of Rengger & Longchamps' work published in English in 1827 describes details of his personal life. This work seems to have had great impact in the English-speaking world, for many of its claims and descriptions have been accepted and used in other works. Thus, White's fictional account of Francia relies heavily on snippets of the work (e.g., one sentence in a footnote dealing with a tailor and cloth becomes an almost tragi-comic scene in El Supremo). The work is cited by historians to this day, as one of the few personal accounts, even if biased against him.

Francia fathered an illegitimate daughter, Ubalda García (1807–1890), known as "la niña Francia," with María Juana García. Although Francia never formally recognized her, Ubalda used the surname "Francia" in various official and ecclesiastical documents during his lifetime, including parish records of the Recoleta Church dating to 1831. Upon Francia's death in 1840, his will granted Ubalda the dictator's private estate, the Quinta de Ybyray, located in the Trinidad neighborhood of Asunción. Through Ubalda's daughter Francisca del Rosario Cañete, the line gave rise to a prominent Paraguayan political family that includes former presidents Pedro Pablo Peña and Santiago Peña Palacios.

== Legacy ==
His reputation abroad was negative: Charles Darwin, for one, hoped he would be overthrown, though Thomas Carlyle (himself no friend to democracy) found material to admire even in the publications of Francia's detractors. Carlyle wrote in an 1843 essay that "Liberty of private judgement, unless it kept its mouth shut, was at an end in Paraguay", but considered that under the social circumstances this was of little detriment to a "Gaucho population ... not yet fit for constitutional liberty."

Francia imbued Paraguay with a tradition of autocratic rule that lasted, with only a few breaks, until 1989. He is still considered a national hero, with a museum dedicated to his memory in Yaguarón. It contains portraits of him and his daughter as well as his sweets box, candlestick and tobacco case. Paraguayan author Augusto Roa Bastos wrote an ambivalent depiction of the life of Francia, a novel entitled Yo el Supremo (I, the Supreme).

The American author Edward Lucas White published an historical work of fiction regarding Francia and Paraguay of the mid-1810s in 1916. The author reworks some history in a playful fashion. For example, he has an almost comedic section (Chapter XX, "Gold Combs in Church") where the protagonist helps two friends whose family members were humiliated at the big Cathedral Sunday Mass by being removed for wearing corsets and gold combs in their hair. In the next chapter, "Service By Edict", Francia forces the Catholic clerics he assembles to hold a third Sunday Mass before noon and give public prominence to the two women, who are allowed their corsets but not their gold hair combs:

- El Supremo: A Romance of the Great Dictator of Paraguay (E. P. Dutton & Co., 1916)

Francia is also the subject of Yo el Supremo by Augusto Roa Bastos. At the time the book was written, Paraguay was under the rule of Alfredo Stroessner, and many consider the book to be at least in part a thinly-disguised attack on Stroessner, who used methods similar to Francia's to achieve and maintain control.

== Popular culture ==
The character of El Supremo in the novel The Happy Return was loosely based on José Rodríguez de Francia. The Happy Return was the first installment of the popular Horatio Hornblower book series by C. S. Forester

Actor Alec Mango portrayed El Supremo in the 1951 film version of Forester's novel.
