= Gerald Martin =

British literary critic and biographer (born 1944)

- Born: February 22, 1944 (age 82); London
- Education: University of Edinburgh UNAM

Gerald Martin (born 22 February, 1944) is an English literary critic whose work focuses on Latin American fiction. He is particularly known for his work on the Guatemalan author Miguel Ángel Asturias and Colombian author Gabriel García Márquez, both Nobel Prize for Literature winners.

His 2008 book, Gabriel García Márquez. A Life, was the first full biography of García Márquez to be published in English.

== Early life and education ==
Gerald Martin studied Spanish, French, and Portuguese at Bristol in 1965 and received his PhD in Latin American Literature from the University of Edinburgh in 1970. After spending a year in Cochabamba, Bolivia, with VSO (1965-1966), he later carried out postgraduate work in UNAM, Mexico (1968-1969) and, as a Harkness Fellowship recipient, was a visiting scholar at Stanford University (1971-1972).

== Career ==
Martin taught for many years at Portsmouth Polytechnic, where he helped to organize the world's first undergraduate degree in Latin American Studies, which pioneered the student year abroad in Latin America. In 1984, he became the first Professor of Hispanic Studies in the Polytechnic sector. He went on to work for 25 years as the only English-speaking member of the Colección Archivos in Paris and in Pittsburgh, and became President of the Instituto Internacional de Literatura Iberoamericana.

In the 1980s he concentrated on the history of literature and the arts, contributing three major chapters to the Cambridge History of Latin America and published Journeys through the Labyrinth: Latin American Fiction in the Twentieth Century (1989).

From 1992 to 2007, he was the Andrew W. Mellon Professor of Modern Languages at the University of Pittsburgh.

His research and publications have focused on the Latin American novel. His PhD was devoted to Nobel Prize winner Miguel Angel Asturias. Martin has also produced critical editions of Hombres de maíz (1981) and El Señor Presidente (2000), as well as translating the former work. He has also translated novels by Rafael Chirbes and Max Aub.

In 2008, he authored Gabriel García Márquez: A Life, an official biography of Gabriel García Márquez with Bloomsbury and Knopf. The book, which Martin put together over 17 years of research, has been translated in over 30 languages.

In 2012, he wrote an Introduction to Gabriel García Márquez for CUP.

== Published works ==
- Miguel Angel Asturias (1975). Men of maize. Translated by Martin, Gerald (Paperback ed.). New York: Delacorte Press. ISBN 0440055830.
- Miguel Angel Asturias (1988). Men of maize. Translated by Martin, Gerald (Paperback ed.). London: Verso. ISBN 086091190X.
- Miguel Ángel Asturias (1981). Martin, Gerald (ed.). Hombres de maíz (Critical ed.). Madrid: Fondo de Cultura Económica - Editorial Klincksieck.
- Miguel Ángel Asturias (1988). Martin, Gerald (ed.). París 1924-1933: Periodismo y creación literaria (Critical ed.). Madrid: ALLCA XX. ISBN 8489666008.
- Martin, Gerald (1989). Journeys through the Labyrinth: Latin American Fiction in the Twentieth Century. London: Verso. ISBN 0-86091-238-8.
- Rafael Chirbes (1992). Mimoun - Masks. Translated by Martin, Gerald (Paperback ed.). London: Serpent's tail. ISBN 9781852422202.
- Miguel Ángel Asturias (1996). Martin, Gerald (ed.). Hombres de maíz (Critical ed.). Madrid: ALLCA XX. ISBN 8489666202.
- Miguel Ángel Asturias (1990). "El Señor Presidente". In Philip Swanson (ed.). Landmarks in Modern Latin American Fiction. Translated by Martin, Gerald. London: Routledge. pp. 50–73. ISBN 0-415-01996-6.
- Miguel Angel Asturias (1993). Men of maize. Translated by Martin, Gerald (Paperback ed.). Pittsburgh: University of Pittsburgh Press. ISBN 0822955148.
- Miguel Ángel Asturias (2000). Martin, Gerald (ed.). El Señor Presidente (Critical ed.). Madrid: ALLCA XX. ISBN 84-89666-51-2.
- Martin, Gerald (2008). Gabriel García Márquez: A Life. London: Bloomsbury. ISBN 978-0-7475-9476-5.
- Max Aub (2009). Field of honour. Translated by Martin, Gerald (Paperback ed.). London: Verso. ISBN 978-1844674008.
- Martin, Gerald (2012). The Cambridge Introduction to Gabriel García Márquez. London: Cambridge University Press. ISBN 978-0521719926.
- Martin, Gerald (2026). Mario Vargas Llosa: A Life. London: Bloomsbury. ISBN 978-1-6397-3772-7.
