= Latin American literature =

Oral and written tradition

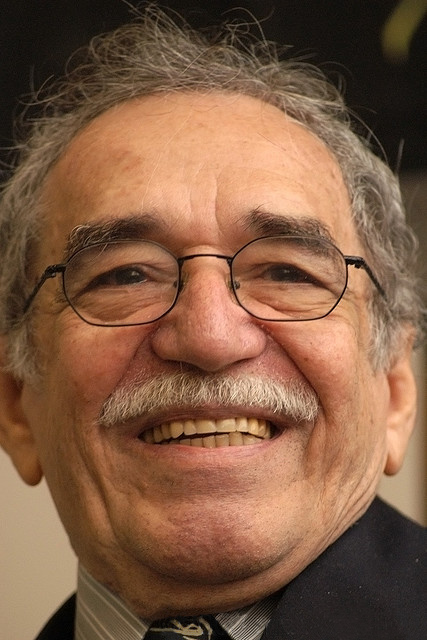
Gabriel García Márquez, one of the most renowned Latin American writers

Latin American literature consists of the oral and written literature of Latin America in several languages, particularly in Spanish, Portuguese, and the indigenous languages of Latin America. Latin American literature rose to particular prominence globally during the second half of the 20th century, largely due to the international success of the style known as magical realism. As such, the region's literature is often associated solely with this style, with the 20th century literary movement known as Latin American Boom, and with its most famous exponent, Gabriel García Márquez. Latin American literature has a rich and complex tradition of literary production that dates back many centuries.

== History ==
=== Pre-Columbian literature ===
Pre-Columbian cultures are documented as primarily oral, although the Mayans and Aztecs – in present-day Mexico and some Central American countries – for instance, produced elaborate codices. Maya script consisted of complex glyphs describing history, mythologies, etc. The Incas in present-day Peru expressed written records through Quipu. Oral accounts of mythological and religious beliefs were also sometimes recorded after the arrival of European colonizers, as was the case with the Popol Vuh. A tradition of oral narrative survives to this day, for instance among the Quechua-speaking population of Peru and the Quiché of Guatemala.

=== Colonial literature ===
From the very moment when Europeans encountered the New World, early explorers and conquistadores produced written accounts and crónicas of their experience, such as Columbus's letters or Bernal Díaz del Castillo's description of the conquest of the Aztec Empire. At times, colonial practices stirred a lively debate about the ethics of colonization and the status of the indigenous peoples, as reflected for instance in Bartolomé de las Casas's Brief Account of the Destruction of the Indies. The first printing press in North America was established in present-day Mexico City in 1539 by publisher Juan Cromberger.

Mestizos and natives also contributed to the body of colonial literature. Authors such as El Inca Garcilaso de la Vega and Guaman Poma wrote accounts of the Spanish conquest that show a perspective that often contrasts with the colonizers' accounts.

During the colonial period, written culture was often in the hands of the church, the context within which Sor Juana Inés de la Cruz wrote memorable poetry and philosophical essays. Her interest in scientific thought and experiment led to professional discussions and writings with Isaac Newton. Toward the end of the 18th century and the beginning of the 19th, a distinctive criollo literary tradition emerged, including the first novels such as José Joaquín Fernández de Lizardi's El Periquillo Sarniento (1816). The "libertadores" themselves were also often distinguished writers, such as Simón Bolívar and Andrés Bello.

=== The 19th century of Latin American literature ===
The 19th century was a period of "foundational fictions" (in the words of critic Doris Sommer), novels in the Romantic or Naturalist traditions that attempted to establish a sense of national identity, and which often focused on the role and rights of the indigenous or the dichotomy of "civilization or barbarism", pioneered in Latin America by Esteban Echeverría, who was influenced by the Parisian romantics while he lived there from 1825 to 1830. Romanticism was then taken up by other prominent literary figures, for which see, the Argentine Domingo Sarmiento's Facundo (1845). Likewise, Alberto Blest Gana's Martin Rivas (1862), widely acknowledged as the first Chilean novel, was at once a passionate love story and a national epic about revolution. Other foundation fictions include the Colombian Jorge Isaacs's María (1867), Ecuadorian Juan León Mera's Cumandá (1879), or the Brazilian Euclides da Cunha's Os Sertões (1902). Such works are still the bedrocks of national canons, and usually mandatory elements of high school curricula.

Other important works of 19th century Latin American literature include regional classics, such as José Hernández's epic poem Martín Fierro (1872). The story of a poor gaucho drafted to fight a frontier war against Indians, Martín Fierro is an example of the "gauchesque", an Argentine genre of poetry centered around the lives of gauchos.

The literary movements of the 19th century in Latin America range from Neoclassicism at the beginning of the century to Romanticism in the middle of the century, to Realism and Naturalism in the final third of the century, and finally to the invention of Modernismo, a distinctly Latin American literary movement, at the end of the 19th century. The next sections discuss prominent trends in these movements more thoroughly.

=== Romanticism, Realism, Naturalism, and Emerging Literary Trends ===
The Latin American wars of Independence that occurred in the early 19th century in Latin America led to literary themes of identity, resistance, and human rights. Writers often followed and innovated popular literary movements (such as Romanticism, Realism, and Naturalism), but many were also exploring ideas such as nationalism and independence. Cultural independence spread across Latin America during this time, and writers depicted Latin American themes and locations in their works. While literature that questioned the colonial order may have emerged initially during the 17th century in Latin America, it rose in popularity in the form of resistance against Spain, the United States, and other imperialist nations in the 19th century. Latin American writers sought a Latin American identity, and this would later be closely tied with the Modernismo literary movement.

Male authors mainly dominated colonial literature, with the exception of literary greats such as Sor Juana Inés de la Cruz, but a shift began in the 19th century that allowed for more female authors to emerge. An increase in women's education and writing brought some women writers to the forefront, including the Cuban Romantic author Gertrudis Gómez de Avellaneda with the novel Sab (1841), a romantic novel offering subtle critique of slavery and the treatment of women in Cuba, the Peruvian Naturalist author Clorinda Matto de Turner who wrote what is considered one of the most important novels of "indigenismo" in the 19th century: Aves sin nido (1889), and the Argentinian Romantic writer Juana Manuela Gorriti (1818–1892), who penned a variety of novels and short stories, such as La hija del mashorquero (1860) and directed a literary circle in Peru. A Naturalist trail-blazer, Peruvian Mercedes Cabello de Carbonera penned Blanca Sol (1888) to critique women's lack of practical work options in her society. Women writers of the 19th century often wrote about the inequalities in Latin America that were vestiges of colonialism such as the marginalization and oppression of Indigenous peoples, slaves, and women. Many works by women in this period challenged Latin American patriarchal societies. These prominent women writers discussed the hypocrisy of the dominant class and institutions that existed in their nascent nations and criticized the corruption of the government. Some prime examples of such works include Clorinda Matto de Turner's Indole, Herencia, and El Conspirador: autobiografia de un hombre publico.

=== Modernismo, the Vanguards, and Boom precursors ===
In the late 19th century, modernismo emerged, a poetic movement whose founding text was the Nicaraguan Rubén Darío's Azul (1888). This was the first Latin American poetry movement to influence literary culture outside of the region, and was also the first truly Latin American literature, in that national differences were no longer as much of an issue and authors sought to establish Latin American connections. José Martí, for instance, though a Cuban patriot, also lived in Mexico and the United States and wrote for journals in Argentina and elsewhere. In 1900 the Uruguayan José Enrique Rodó wrote what became read as a manifesto for the region's cultural awakening, Ariel. Delmira Agustini, one of the female figures of modernismo, wrote poetry that both utilized typical modernist images (such as swans) and adapted them with feminist messages and erotic themes, as critic Sylvia Molloy describes.

Though modernismo itself is often seen as aestheticist and anti-political, some poets and essayists, Martí among them but also the Peruvians Manuel González Prada and José Carlos Mariátegui, introduced compelling critiques of the contemporary social order and particularly the plight of Latin America's indigenous peoples. In this way, the early twentieth century also saw the rise of indigenismo, a trend previously popularized by Clorinda Matto de Turner, that was dedicated to representing indigenous culture and the injustices that such communities were undergoing, as for instance with the Peruvian José María Arguedas and the Mexican Rosario Castellanos.

Resistance against colonialism, a trend that emerged earlier in the 19th century, was also extremely important in modernismo. This resistance literature was promoted by prominent modernists including the aforementioned José Martí (1853–1895) and Rubén Darío (1867–1916). Martí warned readers about the imperialistic tendencies of the United States and described how Latin America should avoid allowing the United States to intervene in their affairs. A prime example of this sort of message is found in Martí's Our America, published in 1892. Darío also worked to highlight the threat of American imperialism, which can be seen in his poem To Roosevelt, as well as his other works Cake-Walk: El Baile de Moda. Many of his works were published in La Revista Moderna de Mexico, a modernist magazine of the time.

The Argentine Jorge Luis Borges invented what was almost a new genre, the philosophical short story, and would go on to become one of the most influential of all Latin American writers. At the same time, Roberto Arlt offered a very different style, closer to mass culture and popular literature, reflecting the urbanization and European immigration that was shaping the Southern Cone. Both writers were the most important emergents in an important controversy in Argentinian literature between the so-called Florida Group of Borges and other writers and artists that used to meet at the Richmond Cafe in the central Florida street of Buenos Aires vs. the Boedo Group of Roberto Arlt that used to meet at the Japanese Cafe in the most peripheral Boedo borough of the same city.

The Venezuelan Rómulo Gallegos wrote in 1929 what came to be one of the best known Latin American novels in the twentieth century, Doña Barbara. Doña Barbara is a realist novel describing the conflict between civilization and barbarism in the plainlands of South America, and is a masterpiece of criollismo. The novel became an immediate hit, being translated into over forty languages.

Notable figures in Brazil at this time include the exceptional novelist and short story writer Machado de Assis, whose both ironic view and deep psychological analysis introduced a universal scope in Brazilian prose, the modernist poets Mário de Andrade, Oswald de Andrade (whose "Manifesto Antropófago" praised Brazilian powers of transculturation), and Carlos Drummond de Andrade.

In the 1920s Mexico, the Stridentism and los Contemporáneos represented the influx of avant-garde movements, while the Mexican Revolution inspired novels such as Mariano Azuela's Los de abajo, a committed work of social realism and the revolution and its aftermath would continue to be a point of reference for Mexican literature for many decades. In the 1930s many artists treated to used a new style to express emotions through the written word, however it is essential to name the Venezuelan writer Arturo Uslar Pietri as the greatest exponent, who is considered the undisputed father of this literary avant-garde who gives life to magical realism with his novel Las lanzas coloradas published in 1931, since it mentions it in search of a name that would explain and reflect the needs that were lived at the time. The writer who would continue In the 1940s, the Cuban novelist and musicologist Alejo Carpentier coined the term "lo real maravilloso" and, along with the Mexican Juan Rulfo and the Guatemalan Miguel Ángel Asturias, would prove a precursor of the Boom of Latin American literature its signature style of "magic realism". Years later, with his novel One Hundred Years of Solitude, the Colombian Gabriel García Márquez would go on to win the 1967 Romulo Gallegos Prize for Literature.

=== Poetry after Modernismo ===
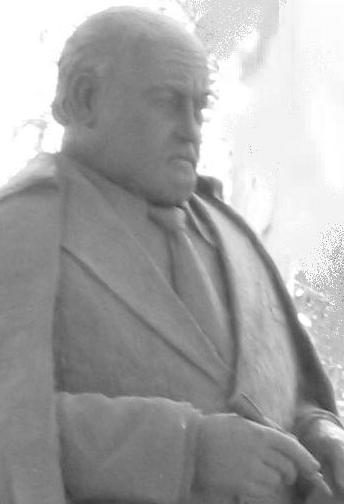
Sculpture of Alfonso Reyes writer of influential pieces of Mexican surrealism.

There is a vibrant tradition of prose poetry in 20th century Latin America; the prose poem becomes a prevalent format for lyrical philosophical inquiry and sensual sentiments of the region's poets. Masters of the prose poem include Jorge Luis Borges ("Everything and Nothing"), Pablo Neruda (Passions and Impressions), Octavio Paz (Aguila o Sol?/Eagle or Sun?), Alejandra Pizarnik ("Sex/Night"), Giannina Braschi (Empire of Dreams) and Rafael Cadenas (Memorial).

Leaders of the vanguard whose poetry express love, romance, and a commitment to left leaning regional politics are Cesar Vallejo (Peru) and Nobel laureate Pablo Neruda (Chile). Following their lead are Ernesto Cardenal (Nicaragua), Roque Dalton (El Salvador), Nicolás Guillén (Cuba), Gonzalo Rojas (Chile) and Mario Benedetti (Uruguay), and Peruvians Blanca Varela, Jorge Eduardo Eielson or Javier Sologuren.

After Modernismo several lesser known, short-lived poetry movements emerged in Latin America. In Chile, Braulio Arenas and others founded in 1938 the Mandrágora group, strongly influenced by Surrealism as well as by Vicente Huidobro's Creacionismo. In Peru, Cesar Moro and Emilio Adolfo Westphalen developed Surrealism in the Andes region.

=== The Boom ===
After World War II, Latin America enjoyed increasing economic prosperity, and a new-found confidence also gave rise to a literary boom. From 1960 to 1967, some of the major seminal works of the boom were published and before long became widely noticed, admired, and commented on beyond Latin America itself. Many of these novels and collections of short stories were somewhat rebellious from the general point of view of Latin America culture. Authors crossed traditional boundaries, experimented with language, and often mixed different styles of writing in their works.

Structures of literary works were also changing. Boom writers ventured outside traditional narrative structures, embracing non-linearity and experimental narration. The figure of Jorge Luis Borges, though not a Boom author per se, was extremely influential for the Boom generation. Latin American authors were inspired by North American and European authors such as William Faulkner, James Joyce, and Virginia Woolf, by the legendary Spanish poet and dramatist Federico García Lorca as well as by each other's works; many of the authors knew one another, which led to a mutual crossbreeding of styles.

The Boom launched Latin American literature onto the world stage. It was distinguished by daring and experimental novels such as Julio Cortázar's Rayuela (1963), that were frequently published in Spanish and quickly translated into English. From 1966 to 1968, Emir Rodríguez Monegal published his influential Latin American literature monthly Mundo Nuevo, with excerpts of unreleased novels from then-new writers such as Guillermo Cabrera Infante or Severo Sarduy, including two chapters of Gabriel García Márquez's Cien años de soledad in 1966. In 1967, the published book was one of the Boom's defining novels, which led to the association of Latin American literature with magic realism, though other important writers of the period such as Mario Vargas Llosa and Carlos Fuentes do not fit so easily within this framework. In the same year, 1967. Miguel Ángel Asturias was awarded the Nobel prize for literature, making his magical realist, metaphor-heavy, folkloristic and sometimes politically charged novels widely known in Europe and North America. Perhaps, the Boom's culmination arrived in Augusto Roa Bastos's monumental Yo, el supremo (1974). Other important novelists of the period include the Chilean José Donoso, the Guatemalan Augusto Monterroso and the Cuban Guillermo Cabrera Infante.

Though the literary boom occurred while Latin America was having commercial success, the works of this period tended to move away from the positives of the modernization that was underway. Boom works often tended not to focus on social and local issues, but rather on universal and at times metaphysical themes.

Political turmoil in Latin American countries such as Cuba at this time influenced the literary boom as well. Some works anticipated an end to the prosperity that was occurring, and even predicted old problems would resurface in the near future. Their works foreshadowed the events to come in the future of Latin America, with the 1970s and 1980s dictatorships, economic turmoil, and Dirty Wars.

=== Post-Boom and Macondo ===
Post-Boom literature is sometimes characterized by a tendency towards irony and humor, as the narrative of Alfredo Bryce Echenique, and towards the use of popular genres, as in the work of Manuel Puig. Some writers felt the success of the Boom to be a burden, and spiritedly denounced the caricature that reduces Latin American literature to magical realism. Hence the Chilean Alberto Fuguet coined McOndo as an antidote to the Macondo-ism that demanded of aspiring writers that they set their tales in steamy tropical jungles in which the fantastic and the real happily coexisted. In a mock diary by post-modernist Giannina Braschi the Narrator of the Latin American Boom is shot by a Macy's make-up artist who accuses the Boom of capitalizing on her solitude. Other writers, however, have traded on the Boom's success: see for instance Laura Esquivel's pastiche of magical realism in Como agua para chocolate.

The Spanish language author who has had most impact in United States has been Roberto Bolaño. Overall, contemporary literature in the region is vibrant and varied, ranging from the best-selling Paulo Coelho and Isabel Allende to the more avant-garde and critically acclaimed work of writers such as Diamela Eltit, Giannina Braschi, Luisa Valenzuela, Marcos Aguinis, Ricardo Piglia, Roberto Ampuero, Jorge Marchant Lazcano, Alicia Yánez, Jaime Bayly, Alonso Cueto, Edmundo Paz Soldán, Gioconda Belli, Jorge Franco, Daniel Alarcon, Víctor Montoya, Carmen Boullosa, or Mario Mendoza Zambrano. Other important figures include the Argentine César Aira, the Peruvian-Mexican Mario Bellatin or the Colombian Fernando Vallejo, whose La virgen de los sicarios depicted the violence in Medellín under the influence of the drug trade. Emerging voices include Fernando Ampuero, Miguel Gutierrez, Edgardo Rivera Martínez, Jaime Marchán and Manfredo Kempff.

There has also been considerable attention paid to the genre of testimonio, texts produced in collaboration with subaltern subjects such as Rigoberta Menchú.

Finally, a new breed of chroniclers is represented by the more journalistic Carlos Monsiváis and Pedro Lemebel, who draw also on the long-standing tradition of essayistic production as well as the precedents of engaged and creative non-fiction represented by the Uruguayan Eduardo Galeano and the Mexican Elena Poniatowska, among others.

== Prominent 20th century writers ==
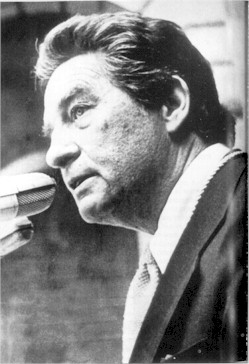
Octavio Paz helped to define modern poetry and the Mexican personality.

According to literary critic Harold Bloom, the most eminent Latin American author of any century is the Argentine Jorge Luis Borges. In his controversial 1994 book The Western Canon, Bloom says: "Of all Latin American authors in this century, he is the most universal... If you read Borges frequently and closely, you become something of a Borgesian, because to read him is to activate an awareness of literature in which he has gone farther than anybody else."

Among the novelists, perhaps the most prominent author to emerge from Latin America in the 20th century is Gabriel García Márquez. His book Cien Años de Soledad (1967), is one of the most important works in world literature of the 20th century. Borges opined that it was "the Don Quixote of Latin America."

Among the greatest poets of the 20th century is Pablo Neruda; according to Gabriel García Márquez, Neruda "is the greatest poet of the 20th century, in any language."

Mexican writer and poet Octavio Paz is unique among Latin American writers in having won the Nobel Prize, the Neustadt Prize, and the Cervantes Prize. Paz has also been a recipient of the Jerusalem Prize, as well as an honorary doctorate from Harvard.

The most important literary prize of the Spanish language is widely considered to be the Cervantes Prize of Spain. Latin American authors who have won this prestigious award include: José Emilio Pacheco (Mexico), Juan Gelman (Argentina), Nicanor Parra (Chile), Sergio Pitol (Mexico), Gonzalo Rojas (Chile), Álvaro Mutis (Colombia), Jorge Edwards (Chile), Guillermo Cabrera Infante (Cuba), Mario Vargas Llosa (Perú), Dulce María Loynaz (Cuba), Adolfo Bioy Casares (Argentina), Augusto Roa Bastos (Paraguay), Carlos Fuentes (Mexico), Ernesto Sabato (Argentina), Octavio Paz (Mexico), Juan Carlos Onetti (Uruguay), Jorge Luis Borges (Argentina), Alejo Carpentier (Cuba) and Rafael Cadenas (Venezuela).

The Latin American authors who have won the most prestigious literary award in the world, the Nobel Prize for Literature, are: Gabriela Mistral (Chile, 1945), Miguel Ángel Asturias (Guatemala, 1967), Pablo Neruda (Chile, 1971), Gabriel García Márquez (Colombia, 1982), Octavio Paz (Mexico, 1990), and Mario Vargas Llosa (Peru, 2010).

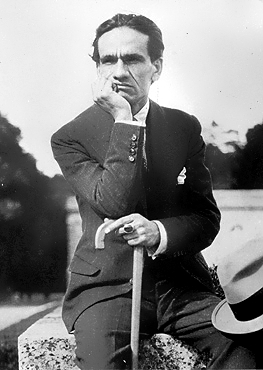
Peruvian poet César Vallejo, considered by Thomas Merton "the greatest universal poet since Dante"

The Neustadt International Prize for Literature, perhaps the most important international literary award after the Nobel Prize, counts several Latin American authors among its recipients; they include: Claribel Alegría (Nicaragua), Álvaro Mutis (Colombia), João Cabral de Melo Neto (Brazil), Octavio Paz (Mexico), and Gabriel García Márquez (Colombia). Candidates for the prize include: Arturo Uslar Pietri (Venezuela), Ricardo Piglia (Argentina), Mario Vargas Llosa (Peru), Marjorie Agosin (Chile), Eduardo Galeano (Uruguay), Homero Aridjis (Mexico), Luis Fernando Verissimo (Brazil), Augusto Monterroso (Guatemala), Ernesto Cardenal (Nicaragua), Carlos Fuentes (Mexico), Jorge Luis Borges (Argentina), Jorge Amado (Brazil), Ernesto Sábato (Argentina), Carlos Drummond de Andrade (Brazil), and Pablo Neruda (Chile).

Another important international literary award is the Jerusalem Prize; its recipients include: Marcos Aguinis (Argentina), Mario Vargas Llosa (Peru), Ernesto Sabato (Argentina), Octavio Paz (Mexico), and Jorge Luis Borges (Argentina).

Latin American authors who figured in prominent literary critic Harold Bloom's The Western Canon list of the most enduring works of world literature include: Rubén Dário, Jorge Luis Borges, Alejo Carpentier, Guillermo Cabrera Infante, Severo Sarduy, Reinaldo Arenas, Pablo Neruda, Octavio Paz, César Vallejo, Miguel Ángel Asturias, José Lezama Lima, José Donoso, Julio Cortázar, Gabriel García Márquez, Mario Vargas Llosa, Carlos Fuentes, and Carlos Drummond de Andrade.

Brazilian authors who have won the Camões Prize, the most prestigious literary award in the Portuguese language, include: João Cabral de Melo Neto, Rachel de Queiroz, Jorge Amado, Antonio Candido, Autran Dourado, Rubem Fonseca, Lygia Fagundes Telles, João Ubaldo Ribeiro, and Ferreira Gullar. Some notable authors who have won Brazil's Prêmio Machado de Assis include: Rachel de Queiroz, Cecília Meireles, João Guimarães Rosa, Érico Veríssimo, Lúcio Cardoso, and Ferreira Gullar.

== Prominent 21st-century writers ==
Latin American literature produced since 2000 spans a wide realm of schools and styles. In the 20th century, Latin American literary studies was primarily centered around what came before, during, and after The Boom. The scholarly optic has since widened to regularly examine Latin American literature within fields such as the Global South, postcolonial literature, postmodern literature, electronic literature, hysterical realism, speculative fiction, Latin American pop culture, crime fiction, horror fiction, among other fields. Prominent 21st-century authors whose works are widely available, taught, and translated into many languages include Mario Vargas Llosa, Isabel Allende, Jorge Volpi, Junot Díaz, Giannina Braschi, Elena Poniatowska, Julia Alvarez, Diamela Eltit, and Ricardo Piglia.

== Latin American Nobel Prize Laureates in Literature ==
- Gabriela Mistral, Chile (1945)
- Miguel Ángel Asturias, Guatemala (1967)
- Pablo Neruda, Chile (1971)
- Gabriel García Márquez, Colombia (1982)
- Octavio Paz, Mexico (1990)
- Mario Vargas Llosa, Peru (2010)

== Chronology: Late 19th century-present day ==
- 1888 Azul Rubén Darío (Nicaragua)
- 1889 Aves sin nido Clorinda Matto de Turner (Peru)
- 1899 Dom Casmurro Joaquim Maria Machado de Assis (Brazil)
- 1900 Ariel José Enrique Rodó (Uruguay)
- 1900 El Moto Joaquin Garcia Monge (Costa Rica)
- 1902 Los maitines de la noche Julio Herrera y Reissig (Uruguay)
- 1902 Os Sertões Euclides da Cunha (Brazil)
- 1903 Horas lejanas Darío Herrera (Panama)
- 1915 El hombre de oro Rufino Blanco-Fombona (Venezuela)
- 1915 Los de abajo Mariano Azuela (Mexico)
- 1917 Los sueños son vida Ricardo Jaimes Freyre (Bolivia)
- 1919 Irremediablemente Alfonsina Storni (Argentina)
- 1919 Los frutos ácidos Alfonso Hernández Catá (Cuba)
- 1919 Raza de bronce Alcides Arguedas (Bolivia)
- 1922 La amada inmóvil Amado Nervo (Mexico)
- 1922 Trilce César Vallejo (Peru)
- 1922 Paulicéia desvairada Mário de Andrade (Brazil)
- 1922 Desolación Gabriela Mistral (Chile)
- 1922 La señorita Etcétera Arqueles Vela (Mexico)
- 1924 La vorágine José Eustasio Rivera (Colombia)
- 1926 Don Segundo Sombra Ricardo Güiraldes (Argentina)
- 1926 La canción de una vida Fabio Fiallo (Dominican Republic)
- 1928 Macunaíma Mário de Andrade (Brazil)
- 1928 Poemas en menguante Mariano Brull (Cuba)
- 1929 Doña Bárbara Rómulo Gallegos (Venezuela)
- 1929 Los siete locos Roberto Arlt (Argentina)
- 1929 Onda Rogelio Sinán (Panama)
- 1930 O Quinze Rachel de Queiroz (Brazil)
- 1931 Altazor Vicente Huidobro (Chile)
- 1931 Las lanzas coloradas Arturo Uslar Pietri (Venezuela)
- 1931 Sóngoro Cosongo Nicolás Guillén (Cuba)
- 1934 Huasipungo Jorge Icaza (Ecuador)
- 1936 Angústia Graciliano Ramos (Brazil)
- 1937 Doble acento Eugenio Florit (Cuba)
- 1938 Olhai os Lírios do Campo Érico Veríssimo (Brazil)
- 1939 El pozo Juan Carlos Onetti (Uruguay)
- 1940 La invención de Morel Adolfo Bioy Casares (Argentina)
- 1940 Mamita Yunai Carlos Luis Fallas (Costa Rica)
- 1941 El mundo es ancho y ajeno Ciro Alegría (Peru)
- 1943 Todo verdor perecerá Eduardo Mallea (Argentina)
- 1943 Vestido de Noiva Nelson Rodrigues (Brazil)
- 1944 Ficciones Jorge Luis Borges (Argentina)
- 1945 A rosa do povo Carlos Drummond de Andrade (Brazil)
- 1946 El señor presidente Miguel Ángel Asturias (Guatemala)
- 1947 Al filo del agua Agustín Yáñez (Mexico)
- 1948 El túnel Ernesto Sabato (Argentina)
- 1948 Adán Buenosayres Leopoldo Marechal (Argentina)
- 1949 Hombres de maíz Miguel Ángel Asturias (Guatemala)
- 1949 O tempo e o vento Érico Veríssimo (Brazil)
- 1949 El Aleph Jorge Luis Borges (Argentina)
- 1949 El reino de este mundo Alejo Carpentier (Cuba)
- 1950 Canto general Pablo Neruda (Chile)
- 1950 El laberinto de la soledad Octavio Paz (Mexico)
- 1950 La vida breve Juan Carlos Onetti (Uruguay)
- 1950 Prisión verde Ramón Amaya Amador (Honduras)
- 1951 La mano junto al muro Guillermo Meneses (Venezuela)
- 1952 Confabulario Juan José Arreola (Mexico)
- 1952 La carne de René Virgilio Piñera (Cuba)
- 1953 Los pasos perdidos Alejo Carpentier (Cuba)
- 1955 El negrero Lino Novás Calvo (Cuba)
- 1955 Morte e Vida Severina João Cabral de Melo Neto (Brazil)
- 1955 Pedro Páramo Juan Rulfo (Mexico)
- 1956 Grande Sertão: Veredas João Guimarães Rosa (Brazil)
- 1956 La hora 0 Ernesto Cardenal (Nicaragua)
- 1958 Gabriela, cravo e canela Jorge Amado (Brazil)
- 1958 Los ríos profundos José María Arguedas (Peru)
- 1959 A Morte e a Morte de Quincas Berro d'Água Jorge Amado (Brazil)
- 1960 Hijo de hombre Augusto Roa Bastos (Paraguay)
- 1960 La tregua Mario Benedetti (Uruguay)
- 1962 Sobre héroes y tumbas Ernesto Sabato (Argentina)
- 1962 El siglo de las luces Alejo Carpentier (Cuba)
- 1962 La amortajada María Luisa Bombal (Chile)
- 1962 La muerte de Artemio Cruz Carlos Fuentes (Mexico)
- 1963 Rayuela Julio Cortázar (Argentina)
- 1963 La ciudad y los perros Mario Vargas Llosa (Peru)
- 1964 A Paixão segundo G.H. Clarice Lispector (Brazil)
- 1965 O Vampiro de Curitiba Dalton Trevisan (Brazil)
- 1965 Marzo anterior José Balza (Venezuela)
- 1966 Cenizas de Izalco Claribel Alegría (El Salvador)
- 1966 La casa verde Mario Vargas Llosa (Peru)
- 1966 Paradiso José Lezama Lima (Cuba)
- 1967 Tres tristes tigres Guillermo Cabrera Infante (Cuba)
- 1967 Cien años de soledad Gabriel García Márquez (Colombia)
- 1967 Quarup Antônio Callado (Brazil)
- 1968 Fuera del juego Heberto Padilla (Cuba)
- 1969 El mundo alucinante Reinaldo Arenas (Cuba)
- 1970 El obsceno pájaro de la noche José Donoso (Chile)
- 1970 La cruz invertida Marcos Aguinis (Argentina)
- 1971 Sargento Getúlio João Ubaldo Ribeiro (Brazil)
- 1973 As Meninas Lygia Fagundes Telles (Brazil)
- 1974 Yo, el supremo Augusto Roa Bastos (Paraguay)
- 1974 El limonero real Juan José Saer (Argentina)
- 1975 El otoño del patriarca Gabriel García Márquez (Colombia)
- 1975 Lavoura Arcaica Raduan Nassar (Brazil)
- 1975 Pobrecito poeta que era yo Roque Dalton (El Salvador)
- 1975 Poema Sujo Ferreira Gullar (Brazil)
- 1975 Terra nostra Carlos Fuentes (Mexico)
- 1976 El beso de la mujer araña Manuel Puig (Argentina)
- 1976 La guaracha del Macho Camacho Luis Rafael Sánchez (Puerto Rico)
- 1978 Maitreya Severo Sarduy (Cuba)
- 1978 Casa de campo José Donoso (Chile)
- 1979 O Que É Isso, Companheiro? Fernando Gabeira (Brazil)
- 1980 Respiración artificial Ricardo Piglia (Argentina)
- 1981 La guerra del fin del mundo Mario Vargas Llosa (Peru)
- 1982 La casa de los espíritus Isabel Allende (Chile)
- 1985 El amor en los tiempos del cólera Gabriel García Márquez (Colombia)
- 1985 El desfile del amor Sergio Pitol (Mexico)
- 1988 El imperio de los sueños Giannina Braschi (Puerto Rico)
- 1988 O Alquimista Paulo Coelho (Brazil)
- 1989 Como agua para chocolate Laura Esquivel (Mexico)
- 1990 Agosto Rubem Fonseca (Brazil)
- 1991 La Gesta del Marrano Marcos Aguinis (Argentina)
- 1992 Antes que anochezca Reinaldo Arenas (Cuba)
- 1995 Maqroll el gaviero Álvaro Mutis (Colombia)
- 1998 Yo-Yo Boing! Giannina Braschi (Puerto Rico)
- 1998 Los detectives salvajes Roberto Bolaño (Chile)
- 1999 La pasion segun Carmela Marcos Aguinis (Argentina)
- 2000 La fiesta del chivo Mario Vargas Llosa (Peru)
- 2000 Dois irmãos Milton Hatoum (Brazil)
- 2001 La reina de América Jorge Majfud (Uruguay)
- 2002 Ojos, de otro mirar: poemas Homero Aridjis (Mexico)
- 2002 Poesía Dulce María Loynaz (Cuba)
- 2004 2666 Roberto Bolaño (Chile)
- 2007 The Brief Wondrous Life of Oscar Wao Junot Díaz (Dominican Republic)
- 2011 United States of Banana Giannina Braschi (Puerto Rico)
- 2019 Torto Arado Itamar Vieira Junior (Brazil)

== Literature by nationality ==
Latin American literature written in Spanish and Portuguese by nationality:

- Argentine literature
- Bolivian literature
- Brazilian literature
- Chilean literature
- Colombian literature
- Costa Rican literature
- Cuban literature
- Dominican literature
- Ecuadorian literature
- Guatemalan literature
- Honduran literature
- Mexican literature
- Nicaraguan literature
- Panamanian literature
- Paraguayan literature
- Peruvian literature
- Puerto Rican literature
- Salvadoran literature
- Uruguayan literature
- Venezuelan literature

== See also ==
- Chicano literature
- Chicano poetry
- Culture of Latin America
- Dictator Novel
- Latin American Gothic
- Latino American literature
- Latino American poetry
- Nuyorican
- Portuguese-language literature
- Spanish-language literature
- Indigenous peoples of the Americas § Central America
- Latin American Canadians § Writers
