= Vidas secas =

1938 novel by Graciliano Ramos

Barren Lives
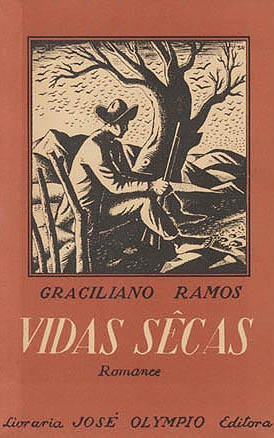
- First edition
- Author: Graciliano Ramos
- Original title: Vidas seccas
- Language: Portuguese
- Publication date: 1938
- Publication place: Brazil
- Media type: Print (Hardback & Paperback)

Vidas secas (1st edition spelling: Vidas sêcas, literally "Dry Lives"; translated into English as Barren Lives) is a novel by twentieth-century Brazilian writer Graciliano Ramos, written in 1938. It tells the cyclical story of a family of five persons: Fabiano, the father; Sinhá Vitória, the mother; two sons (just called boys) and their dog called Baleia (whale in Portuguese) in the poverty stricken and arid Brazilian northeast. One of the distinguishing characteristics of the book is that it is written in said cyclical manner, making it possible to read the first chapter as a continuation of the last chapter, reflecting the cycle of poverty and desolation in the Sertão. Another distinguishing characteristic is that the dog Baleia is considered the most sensible and human character.

It is often considered amongst the most important works in Brazilian literature, blurring the genres of Modernism, Regionalism, and Realism with a "dry", concise style of writing. Due to its exploration of complex social and existential problems within Brazilian society, Vidas Secas has been lauded by critics as significantly contributing to the evolution of Brazilian literature.

== Plot summary ==
Often attributed to its composition as a “collection of autonomous short stories,” that were originally published in various newspapers throughout 1938 in order for Graciliano Ramos to capitalise on his writings, the thirteen chapters of Vidas Secas can be read individually or as a group without affecting the overarching thematic qualities of the novel. The supposed fragmentary nature of the novel, in congruence with the readers’ exposure to various narrative or plot developments through the shifting point of view of different characters, has been cited by critics as intrinsically linking both reader and character in a shared emotional state.

The plot of Vidas Secas follows the exploits of the vaqueiro (cowboy) Fabiano, his wife Sinhá Vitória, their two sons (who remain unnamed throughout the novel), and their dog Baleia (whale), in their attempts to forge a meagre existence within the arid interior of Brazil’s north-eastern Sertão. The novel opens with Fabiano and his family escaping an extreme drought by taking shelter in an abandoned fazenda (farm), whereupon they await the return of seasonal rains and tend to a wealthy landowner’s cattle. Within the first few scenes of the novel, the harsh nature of life on the Sertão is illustrated by the family killing and eating their pet parrot, the mute papagaio.

Although their time at the fazenda initially brings an “austere version of domestic stability,” Fabiano’s inability to negotiate fair wages with the landowner, along with his difficulty in navigating the city and its corrupt officials, ultimately leaves the family destitute. The family’s troubles are exacerbated by Fabiano’s run-ins with the ‘Yellow Soldier,’ a corrupt government official who bests Fabiano in a crooked card game and provokes a fight which results in Fabiano’s imprisonment. Though Fabiano is subsequently released, problems for the family continue to arise.

The next few chapters explore the varying perspectives of the other family members. A chapter dedicated to Sinhá Vitória illustrates her obsession with overcoming their destitute circumstances through her imaginative conceptualisations of “owning a comfortable bed of leather and sucupira wood.” Similarly, proceeding chapters highlights the eldest and youngest sons’ struggle to understand the sertaneja (people of the sertão) lifestyle and explores their differing perceptions of their father.

The family’s fortunes are met with further decline in the chapter ‘The Dog’ (or ‘Baleia’ in the original Portuguese edition) which has been cited by critics as “one of the most moving episodes in Brazilian literature.” The chapter, seen predominantly from the perspective of Baleia, was the first written by Graciliano Ramos and has thus been cited by critics as his inspiration for writing Vidas Secas. ‘Baleia’ documents the sick and aging dog’s death at the hands of Fabiano, following his suspicion of her contraction of rabies. After being shot in the hindquarters by Fabiano, Baleia thinks only of her household duty to mind the family goats and rather than holding animosity towards Fabiano, thinks only of licking her masters’ hand.

In the final chapters of the novel after continued economic deprivation at the hands of the wealthy landowner, along with the deep foreboding of the onset of yet another drought, the family escapes under the cover of night to wander towards “a big city in hopes of a better life.”

== Characters ==
=== Major characters ===
- Fabiano: the illiterate vaqueiro (cowboy) stands as the main protagonist in Vidas Secas, holding the largest share of story events, experiencing the most extreme character arc and featuring heavily in other characters’ internal and external dialogues. He has been lauded by critics as a heroic character and the “perennial sertanejo stoically resigned to his destiny.”
- Sinhá Vitória: the stoic sertão woman, accustomed to the deprivations and brutal reality of living in poverty. As the novel progresses, she becomes increasingly disenfranchised with her reality, fantasising about “coming-out-of-the-wild,” and obsessing over material possessions.
- The Youngest Son: plays a very important part in the consolidation of Fabiano’s character. The youngest son idolises his father as a god-like figure who embodies the Sertão and later attempts to emulate Fabiano’s style and good character.
- The Eldest Son: or filho mais velho, unlike his younger brother, ‘The Eldest Son’ becomes progressively disconnected with his father and life on the Sertão and views language as having the ability to break the cycle of poverty.
- The Dog: or ‘Baleia’ (‘Whale’ in Portuguese) is one of the most symbolically important characters in the novel. Critics have argued that the humanisation of Baleia through readers’ experiencing the world through her point of view accentuates the grossly dehumanising effects of poverty on other characters. Similarly, other critics have cited her thoughts during her final moments as symbolic of an ultimate submission to authority.

=== Other characters ===
- Papagaio: the unnamed, mute parrot is the family pet who is killed and eaten at the beginning of the novel. The family’s consumption and later lack of recall of the episode, was cited by one critic as being symbolic of the family’s dehumanisation through poverty.
- The Yellow Soldier: appears in the third chapter ‘Jail’ (or ‘Cadeia’ in the original Portuguese edition) and the eleventh chapter ‘The Policeman in Khaki.’ ‘The Yellow Soldier’ has been viewed by critics as a plot device which acts as a catalyst for the challenging of Fabiano’s beliefs and contributes to the evolution of his characterisation. Another critic has argued that ‘The Yellow Soldier’ stands as an “allegorical allusion to the way in which the State makes itself present in the regions of the sertão.”
- Municipal Tax Collector: appears in the tenth chapter ‘Accounts’ as an overbearing figure of authority who informs Fabiano of his outstanding debts and crushes his dream of overcoming poverty.

== Concept & creation ==
=== Background ===
“In the context of Brazilian literature Graciliano Ramos stands out as one of the most provocative names, having significantly contributed to its coming of age in all senses, but especially with respect to the aesthetic representation of social problems.”

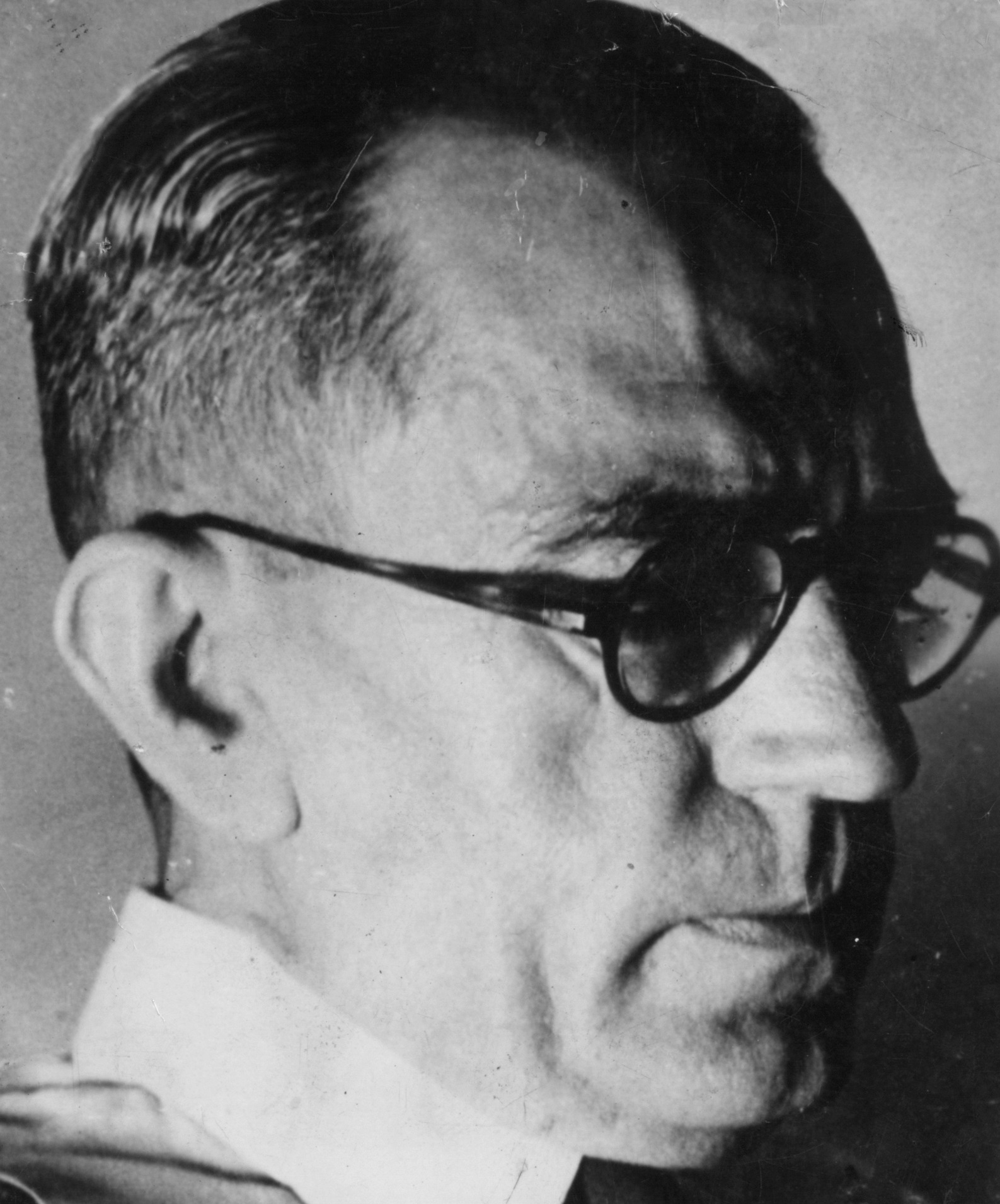
Graciliano Ramos, 1940.

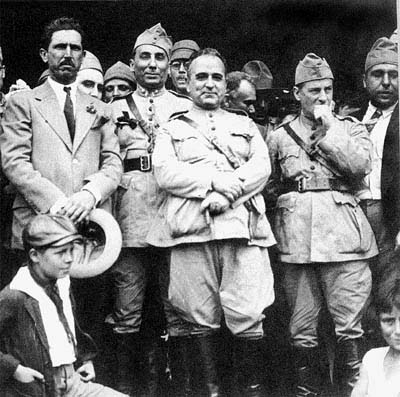
Getúlio Vargas (centre), after the 1930 revolution.

Following the publication of the prolific works Caetes (1933), São Bernardo (1934), and Angústia (1936), Vidas Secas was the fourth and final novel produced by Graciliano Ramos. Written shortly after Ramos’ release from prison in 1937, Vidas Secas was first composed as a series of short independent stories that featured in local newspapers throughout 1938, before it was eventually published as a novel in 1939. Prior to his imprisonment and subsequent conception of Vidas Secas, Ramos had been serving as director of Public Instruction in Alagoas (1933–36). However, upon Getulio Vargas’ assumption of power in 1936, and the establishment of a dictatorial Estado Novo (New State) government, Ramos was dismissed from his position without explanation, arrested, and sent to Rio de Janeiro. Here he spent a further ten months awaiting trial before his eventual release under equally dubious circumstances. Though at the time he was not a member of the Communist Party, Ramos’ imprisonment was one of many in Vargas’ politically repressive campaign and is speculated to have influenced the “representation of extreme deprivation and the unequal distribution of power” throughout Vidas Secas.

These covert political denunciations of the Estado Novo, along with stark aesthetic representations of poverty and suffering throughout Vidas Secas would position Graciliano Ramos as a leading figure within the Generation of 1930. The term, coined by the author of Vidas Secas’ first English translation, Ralph E. Dimmick, was used to describe a second wave of Brazilian Modernism in which, “the Brazilian literary firmament was transformed by the appearance of a galaxy of young authors.” This Generation of 1930 became incensed with the development of a sense of ‘Brazilianism’ within literature and art. Through novels such as Vidas Secas, Graciliano Ramos is said to have emerged within The Generation of 1930 “as an often caustic commentator on the foibles of the small-town bourgeoisie of his North-East region.”

=== Setting ===
No doubt influenced by Ramos’ upbringing in the State of Alagoas in the North-East of Brazil, the events of Vidas Secas largely take place upon the bleak backdrop of the drought-stricken and exceptionally inhospitable Sertão. The term Sertão, in an etymological sense, found its first usage during early Portuguese colonial expansion in descriptions of unchartered inland territories or “undeveloped lands.” By the time of the novel’s publication, literary focus on the Sertão, as not only a geographic categorisation but as a concept for Brazilian nationhood, had become intrinsically linked with both the Regionalist and Modernist movements. This literary obsession with the Sertão, has led critics such as Diogo Mainardi to allege that “romanticized portrayals of the Sertão, and sertaneja culture have enjoyed a disproportionate focus in the construction of the national imagination.”

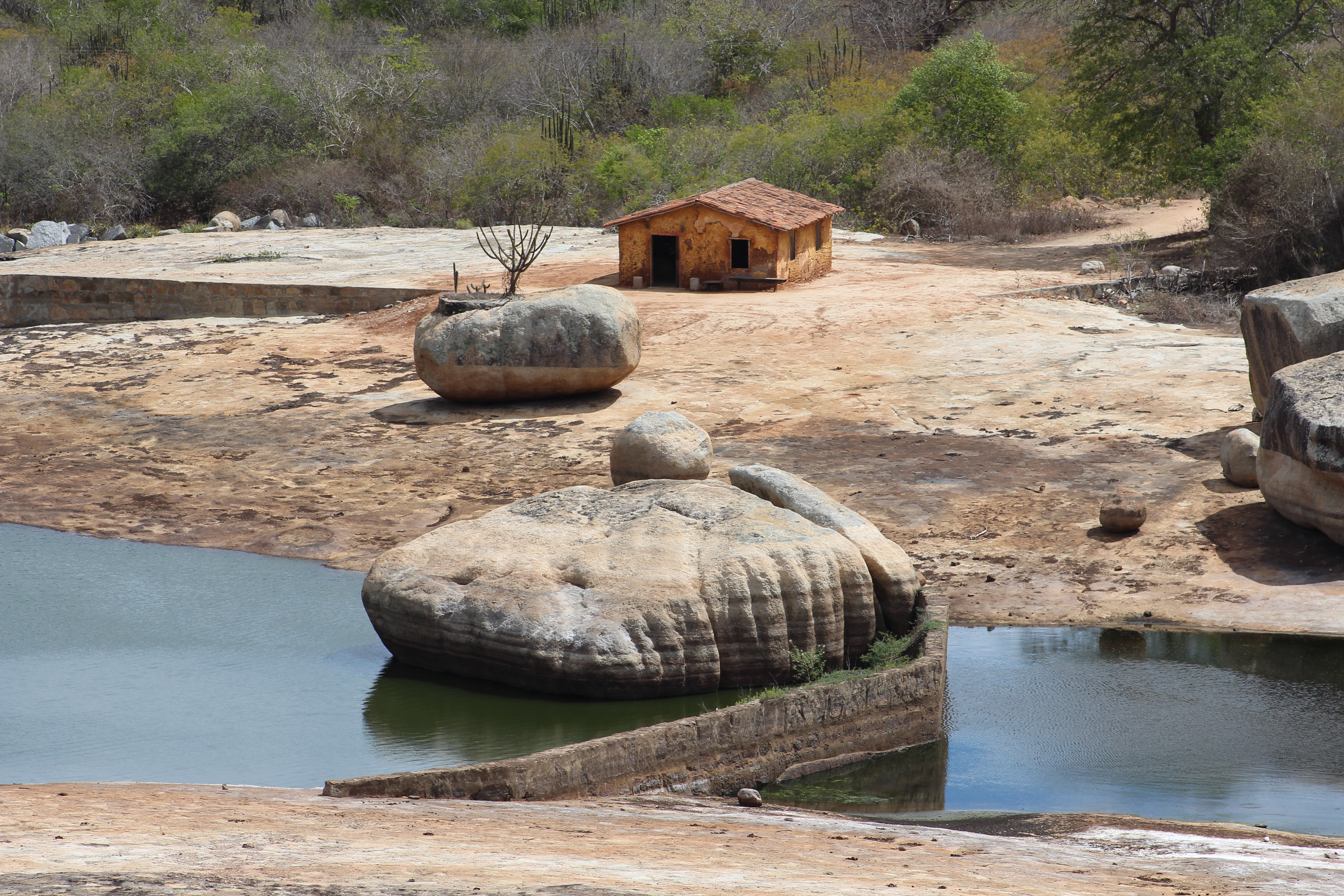
A fazenda located in Lajedo de Pai Mateus, North-eastern Brazil.

In Vidas Secas, Ramos opts for an ambiguous or “universal” conceptualisation of the Sertão, deciding not to name it “as one region among others in the geographical continuum of the surface of the earth.” As such, a cursory scan for place names or topographical features throughout the pages of the novel may leave readers temporally and spatially wanting. However, this withholding of place names is unlikely an attempt to position the novel as a universal allegory, but rather, as a contribution to Realism. As one scholar eloquently put it; “The realism of Vidas Secas lies in the fidelity of a representation of life not in the wealth of its concrete determinacy but in its exhaustion and evanescence.” As such, it has been said that the focal point of Ramos’ description of landscapes and botanicals specific to North-Eastern Brazil lies not in its ability to spatially ground the reader in an exact setting, but merely serves as a literary vehicle to enable a greater exploration of the characters’ inner turmoil. In other words, Ramos employs the use of the Sertão setting to “recreate the drama of people eking out a living in a land flagellated by natural calamities.”

=== Influences ===
==== Modernismo ====
Modernismo: or ‘Modernism,’ in a Brazilian context, refers to the two literary, artistic, and cultural waves of the broader Modernist Movement in the 1920s and 1930s. Though the emergence of the first wave of Modernism in Brazil coincided with the European avant-garde movement, critics have illustrated that its proponents’ primary consideration lay in the foundation of a literary code that characterised “Brazilianism.” As the first wave of Brazilian Modernism focused predominantly on creating linguistic and aesthetic representations of Brazil, it has been criticised for its limited social commentary on the reasons for Brazilian backwardness. Similarly, another common criticism of Brazilian Modernist works has been the over-reliance on colloquial terms and a dismissal of traditional Portuguese linguistic norms.

The second wave of Brazilian Modernism also referred to as the “Generation of 1930,” aimed to deepen the linguistic narrative of the previous generation by imbuing modernist works with a greater social commentary. Galvanised by Gilberto Freyre's publication of Casa grande e senzala (The Masters and the Slaves), the “Generation of 1930” strove to illuminate the historically repressed and degraded individuals of Brazilian society. Due to his extensive experimentation with the characteristics of modernismo throughout his novels, critics have cited Graciliano Ramos as “the most expressive name in the second moment of Brazilian Modernism.”

==== Regionalismo ====
Regionalismo: or ‘Regionalism’ is a term used to describe works of literature which focus on, and are framed by, the social and historical background of a specific region and its geographical or natural features. In a Brazilian literary context, novels that portray the interior of the country were traditionally referred to as ‘sertanistas.’ Although 19th century ‘sertanista novels’ aimed to highlight the growing disparity between national power centres on the coast and the destitute interior, scholars have criticised these early works of rural regionalism for their limited fixation with a novel’s aesthetic traits rather than as a means of pure social critique.

However, the publication of Euclides da Cunha's, Os sertôes (1902) brought critical legitimacy to the literary movement through its stark exploration of extreme poverty, lack of education, and natural crises leading to extreme social and cultural underdevelopment in the North-Eastern interior of Brazil. As such, with the explosion of literary modernist movements in the 1920s and 1930s, literary depictions of the Sertão, now referred to as ‘regionalista novels,’ became integral to politically motivated authors’ criticism of the government’s abandonment of the State.

Graciliano Ramos’ bleak depiction of the squalid and impoverished living conditions of a family of retirantes attempting to forge a living upon the arid sertão, has been cited by critics as establishing Vidas Secas as a classic ‘regionalista’ novel within Brazilian literary history.

==== Realism ====
In the context of Brazilian literary history, ‘Realism’ refers to a commitment from writers to provide “authenticity” to literary works which engenders a sense of national identity. Brazilian Realism was an important facet of nation-building during the colonial and post-colonial eras and is said to have resulted in the rejection of narratives of invention and overly subjective writing. According to Luiz Costa Lima within a Realist framework, “Brazilian fiction obeys the primacy of observation” and is employed to capture representations of Brazil “realistically.” In the 1930s, at the time of Vidas Secas’ conception, Brazilian Realism re-emerged under the banner of Neorealism as a response to the Estado Novo’s attempts to co-opt artists and writers into formulating a favourable view of Brazilian society under Vargas’ regime. Neorealism endeavoured to undermine notions of Brazilian cosmopolitanism by highlighting the lesser developed cities and rural areas of Brazil. Graciliano Ramos is said to have been exasperated with the fact that Brazilian literature was not realist enough and attempted to employ Neorealist writing practices to reflect the contemporary conditions of the Brazilian North-East in Vidas Secas.

== Genre ==
“Graciliano’s novel...has been hailed as both regionalista and modernista, realistic and unrealistic.”

— Ximena Briceño

Due to its commitment to portraying the reality of the social and human landscape in the Brazilian North-East, as well as its overt protests against the prevailing social order, Vidas Secas is widely considered to be a ‘regionalista’ or ‘sertantista’ novel that submits to the literary parameters of the genre of Regionalism. Similarly, due to Ramos’ focus on the humiliation and misery of individuals’ struggle with the dichotomy of progress and backwardness within the Brazilian modernisation process, Vidas Secas is also considered to belong to the genre of Modernism.

Furthermore, Vidas Secas has been hailed internationally as a classic of Brazilian Realism. This is due to the intrinsic links in writing practices between Modernism and Regionalism with Realism or Neorealism, as well as Ramos’ literary experimentalism in attempting to document the reality of impoverished workers living in the hinterlands. Similarly, due to the novel’s engagement with social problems and direct attempts to highlight the reality of Brazilian contemporary society, Antonio Candido argued that Vidas Secas belonged to the genre of Naturalism. Lastly, Vidas Secas has also been argued to contain elements of Latin American Magical Realism.

== Style ==
Graciliano Ramos’ writing style in Vidas Secas has been described as direct, objective, and dry. This has been attributed to Ramos’ yearning to represent the reality of life on the Sertão through the “absolute concision of words” and the author’s view that this could be achieved through precise language and narrative structure. Similarly, the voice of Vidas Secas has been described as “melancholic” in tone.

Additionally, Ramos’ novel employs the use of free indirect discourse to accentuate this melancholic voice. Free indirect discourse is a covert form of narration whereby the traditional third person narrator is secondary to the protagonists’ thoughts which become the focal point of the novel. This style is employed throughout the shifting points of view of the five protagonists between each chapter in order to achieve a greater sense of character development, in addition to functioning as a means of fusing third person objectivity with first person subjectivity. Ramos’ use of narrative focalization through free indirect discourse in Vidas Secas has been credited as effectively stylising sertanejo speech in the canon of Brazilian regionalist works.

Vidas Secas has also been noted by critics for its cyclical narrative structure which has been argued to reflect the cycle of drought and poverty inhabitants of the Sertão are exposed to. However, each of the chapters can also be read as independent short stories without detracting from the underlying messages of the novel. These narrative quirks are said to contribute to the creation of a “literary puzzle” within Vidas Secas which encourages readers to engage more actively with the reading process.

== Themes ==
=== Anthropomorphism ===
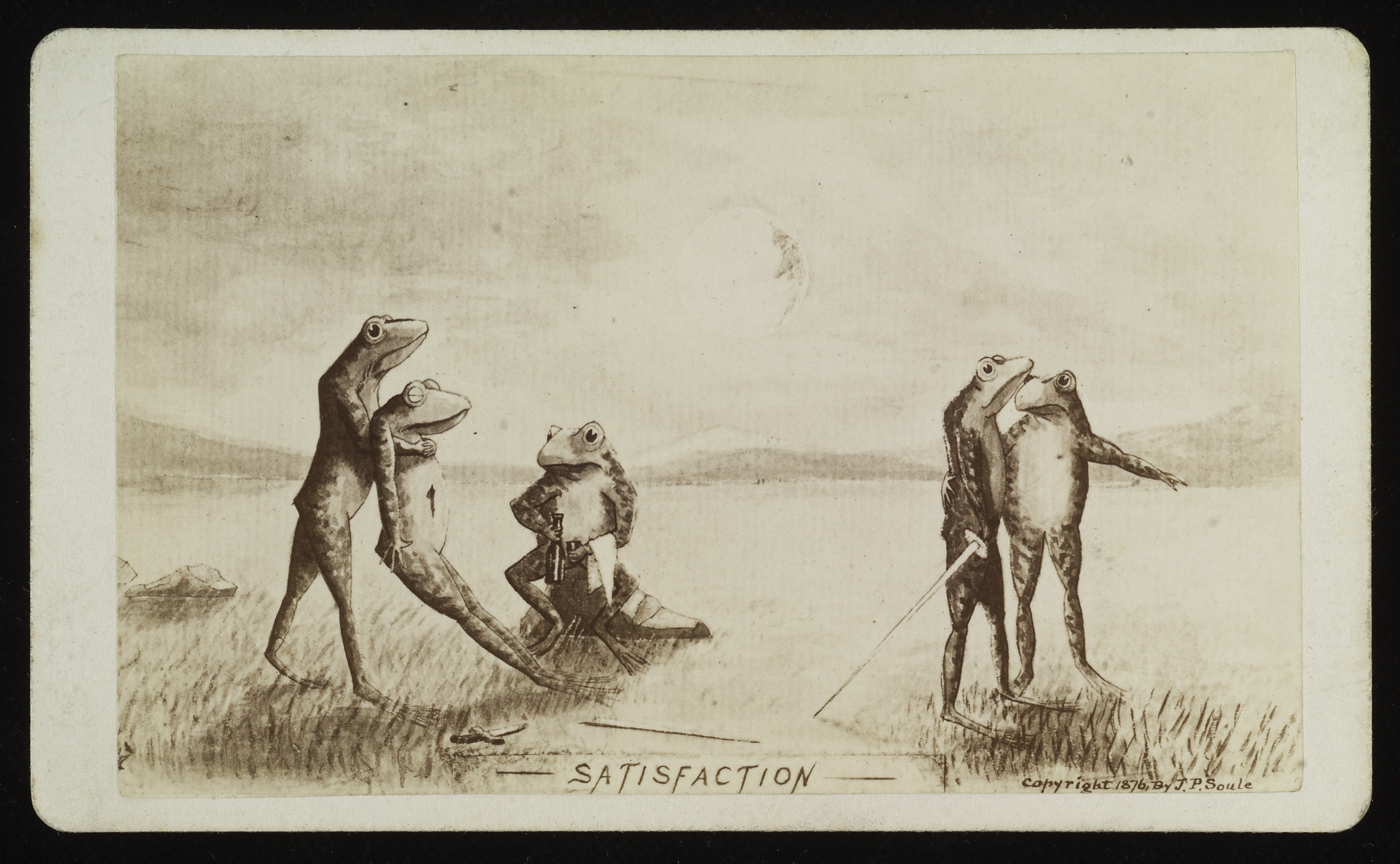
"Frogs conducting a duel." Anthropomorphism in art.

One of the most notable themes of Vidas Secas is the interrelatedness of anthropomorphism and dehumanisation. Critics have suggested that the exploration of the dog Baleia’s human-like consciousness, in juxtaposition to that of the humans’ primitive ideals, illustrates their shared lack of agency and infers the dehumanisation of mankind. Similarly, other critics have argued that the representation of juxtaposing human and animal consciousness results in the “deconstruction of the non-human/human binary” and also explores a “symbiotic relation between humans and non-humans.” Furthermore, the parallels between Fabiano and Baleia’s command of language, in conjunction with their submission to authority, have been highlighted by critics as illustrative of the dehumanising effect of poverty.

=== Poverty ===
In line with Vidas Secas’ conformity to the narrative tropes of the ‘sertanista’ or regionalist genre, Ramos’ novel aims to emphasise the social and cultural underdevelopment in Northeastern Brazil by illustrating the impoverished living conditions, malnutrition, and illiteracy, inherent to the Sertão. In particular, critics have argued that the representation of illiteracy throughout the novel is employed to highlight the cyclical nature of poverty. This exploration of illiteracy as perpetuating the cycle of poverty is accentuated in the chapter dedicated to the filho mais velho (eldest son). In this chapter, the eldest son, frustrated with his parents’ rudimentary command of language and inability to communicate abstract ideas, identifies language as the determining factor in extending his intellectual horizons. Critics have pointed to the eldest son’s obsession with learning a new word as Ramos’ attempt to illustrate the fact that language or illiteracy can be a major barrier to social mobility within impoverished communities.

=== Humanity vs. Nature ===
Critics have positioned the protagonists’ relationship with the natural world as seminal to the underlying message of humanity’s struggle to overcome the “cruel vagaries of nature.” Established within the first chapter of the novel, Ramos’ portrayal of humanity and nature at odds is said to establish a “tragic and epic tone reminiscent of Euclydes da Cunha’s Os Sertões.” Other critics have argued that a sense of fatalism is established by this exploration of ‘Humanity vs. Nature.’ This is due to the fact that the cyclical nature of the novel ensures that the actions of the family at the beginning and end of Vidas Secas are entirely informed by a yearning to escape the cycle of drought on the Sertão. This fatalistic reading illuminates the intrinsic links between humanity and ecology and infers the inevitable continuation of human suffering due to natural calamities on the Sertão.

== Film ==
=== Background ===
Vidas secas was adapted into a highly praised film by Nelson Pereira dos Santos, in 1963, and would become a landmark for the Cinema Novo movement. Released during the first wave of the Cinema Novo movement (1960-1964), Dos Santos’ film has been regarded by critics as “seminal to the formation of a movement that engaged film as a political praxis against neo-colonialism and dependency in Brazil.” Cinema Novo or "new cinema" arose in Brazil concurrently with the "new wave" in France, and its champions, such as Brazilian filmmakers Pereira dos Santos, Ruy Guerra, Carlos Diegues and Glauber Rocha, aimed to create an “‘aesthetic of hunger’ to better reflect and denounce the country’s social reality.”

Dos Santos’ adaptation of Vidas Secas has been regarded by critic Rachel Price as “a fairly faithful transposition,” of Ramos’ work, scarcely deviating from the established narrative structure and plot. The film is set in 1940, and in keeping with the novel, follows the exploits of an impoverished migrant family wandering the barren landscapes of the north-eastern interior of Brazil. Dos Santos’ adaptation is said to be so faithful to Ramos’ written work that one critic argued that the film “wears down the words of the original text by the finicalness with which it repeats descriptions and dialogue.”

=== Cinematic tropes ===
The film’s aesthetic qualities of starkly stylised visuals and sharp textures have been compared to both the German post-expressionist conception of Magical Realism, as well as manifestations of Alejo Carpentier's distinctive ‘Marvelous Real.’ Dos Santos’ exploration of the bleak subject matter of “landscape’s imposing barrenness, the faces and bodies of suffering animals and people, and a flinty, hardscrabble ethos,” is magnified by deep-focus lighting and an apparent narrative directness which resembles the directorial tropes of Neorealism. The aesthetic beauty of Dos Santos’ adaptation is such that one Vincent Canby, in a 1969 review, argued that the film’s cinematography “ultimately makes poverty photogenic,” and undermines the political messages of Vidas Secas.

== See also ==
- History of Brazil
- Brazilian literature
- Drought
- Agreste
- Brazil Socio-Geographic Division
- Sertão
- Droughts
- Tieta do Agreste, a Brazilian novel and film
- Caatinga
