= Graciliano Ramos =

Brazilian writer and politician (1892–1953)

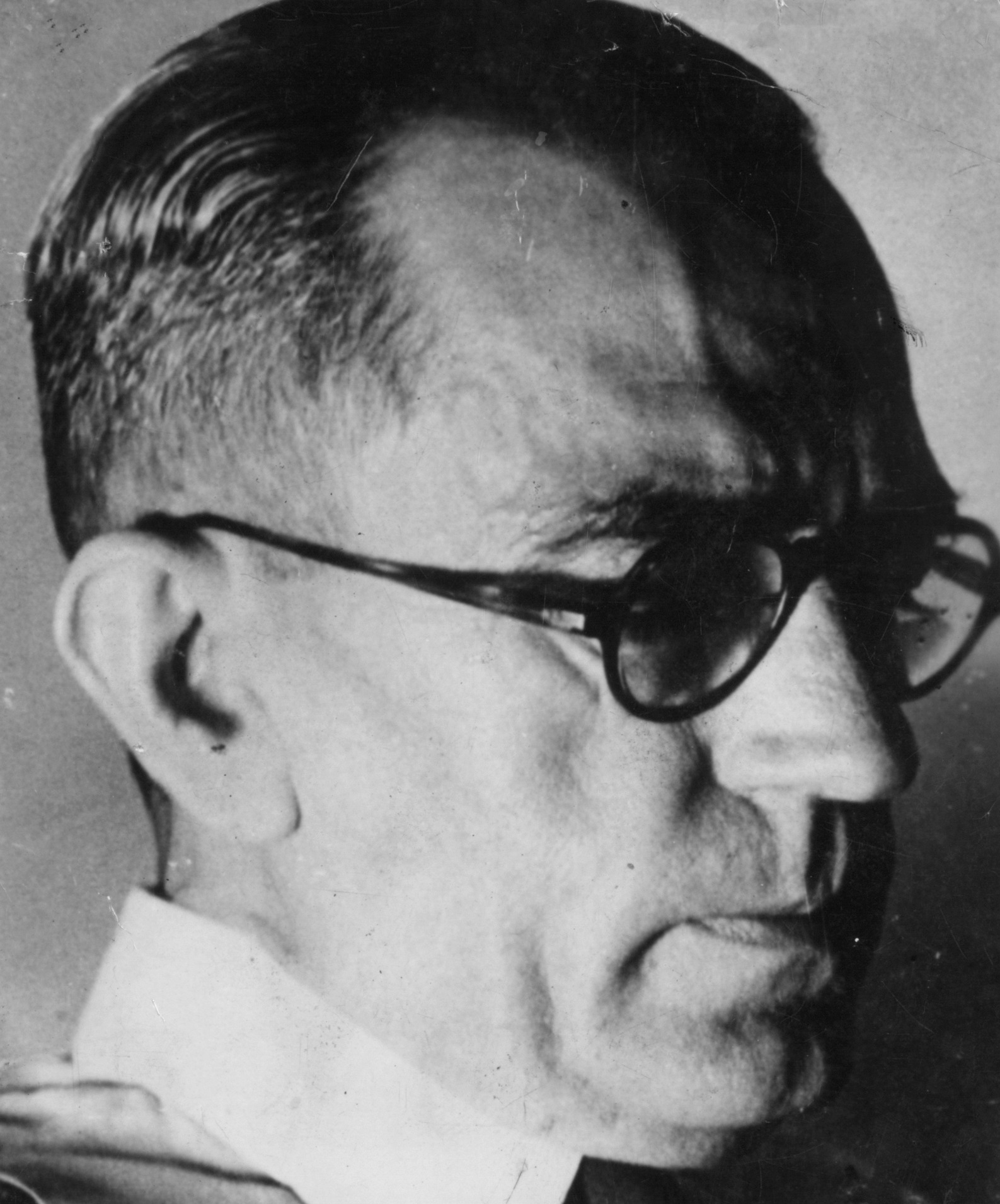
- Ramos in 1940
- Born: Graciliano Ramos de Oliveira; October 27, 1892; Quebrangulo, Alagoas, Brazil
- Died: March 20, 1953 (aged 60); Rio de Janeiro, Brazil
- Other names: Feliciano de Olivença; Almeida Cunha
- Occupations: Novelist, politician, journalist
- Notable work: Vidas Secas, Angústia, São Bernardo, A Terra dos Meninos Pelados
- Height: 1.75 m (5 ft 9 in)
- Title: Mayor of Palmeira dos Índios
- Term: 1928–1930
- Political party: Brazilian Communist Party
- Spouse(s): Maria Augusta de Barros (1915–1920) (her death); Heloísa Leite de Medeiros (1928–1953) (his death)
- Children: Márcio Ramos (1916–1950); Júnio Ramos (1917–1975); Múcio Ramos (1919–1994); Maria Ramos (1920–1980); Ricardo Ramos (1929–1992); Roberto Ramos (1930); Luísa Ramos (1931–2022); Clara Ramos (1932–1993)
- Parent(s): Sebastião Ramos de Oliveira (died 1934); Maria Amélia Ramos (died 1943)

Graciliano Ramos de Oliveira (Brazilian Portuguese pronunciation: [ɡɾasiliˈɐnu ˈʁɐmuz dʒi oliˈvejɾɐ]; October 27, 1892 – March 20, 1953) was a Brazilian modernist writer, politician and journalist. He is known worldwide for his portrayal of the precarious situation of the poor inhabitants of the Brazilian sertão in his novel Vidas secas. His characters are complex, nuanced, and tend to have pessimistic world views, from which Ramos deals with topics such as the lust for power (the main theme in São Bernardo), misogyny (a key point in Angústia), and infidelity. His protagonists are mostly lower-class men from northeastern Brazil, which are often aspiring writers (such as in Caetés), or illiterate country workers, all of which usually have to deal with poverty and complex social relations.

Like fellow writers Jorge Amado and Erico Verissimo, Ramos was part of Brazil's second generation of modernist writers, in what is known as "1930s modernism". Critics have drawn parallels between some of his work and the Southern Gothic tradition. A lifelong supporter of communist ideas, he was affiliated with the original Brazilian Communist Party.

== Life ==
Graciliano Ramos de Oliveira was born in the city of Quebrangulo, in the Brazilian state of Alagoas, on October 27, 1892, to Sebastião Ramos de Oliveira and Maria Amélia Ramos. Graciliano was the oldest of the couple's 16 children.

He would spend most part of his childhood travelling through different cities of Northeast Brazil. After finishing high school in Maceió, he became a collaborator of the newspaper Jornal de Alagoas in 1909, where he published a sonnet called "Céptico" under the pen name Almeida Cunha, and some other texts under many different pseudonyms. He also published texts in the magazine O Malho, under the pen name Feliciano de Olivença, and founded a short-lived periodical named Echo Viçosense in 1906.

In 1914 he moved to Rio de Janeiro, but had to return to Alagoas in September 1915, in order to live with his father, who became a salesman in the city of Palmeira dos Índios. Also in 1915, he married his first wife, Maria Augusta de Barros, having with her four children. Maria Augusta died in 1920, due to troubles during childbirth.

In 1927, Ramos was elected mayor of Palmeira dos Índios: he took office in 1928 and would abdicate his post in 1930. Mesmerized by the high literary quality of his prefecture reports, Augusto Frederico Schmidt would approach Ramos into publishing his first novel, Caetés, that Ramos started to write circa 1925. He would finish Caetés in 1930, but did not publish it until 1933. In 1928, he married his second wife, Heloísa Leite de Medeiros, having with her four more children.

From 1930 to 1936 he lived once again in Maceió. In 1934 he published the novel São Bernardo, and in the following year, he was arrested due to alleged (but never confirmed) participation in the Communist uprising of 1935. (Graciliano wrote an account of his time in prison named Memórias do Cárcere, published a few months after his death in 1953.) After being freed from prison, he publishes with the help of associates such as José Lins do Rego his most famous novel, Angústia.

In 1938 he publishes Vidas Secas and moves definitely to Rio de Janeiro, where he became in 1945 a member of the Communist Party of Brazil. In the subsequent years, he travelled alongside his wife to countries such as France, Portugal, the Soviet Union and Czechoslovakia. Also in 1945 he published an account of his childhood years, named Infância. Beginning in 1952, Graciliano's health gradually began to decline. He was diagnosed with lung cancer and, after an unsuccessful surgery, died on March 20, 1953. His wife Heloísa would die 46 years later, in Salvador, Bahia.

Graciliano was survived by six children and his second wife.

=== Religion ===
Graciliano described himself as an atheist, although he enjoyed reading the Bible.

== Works ==
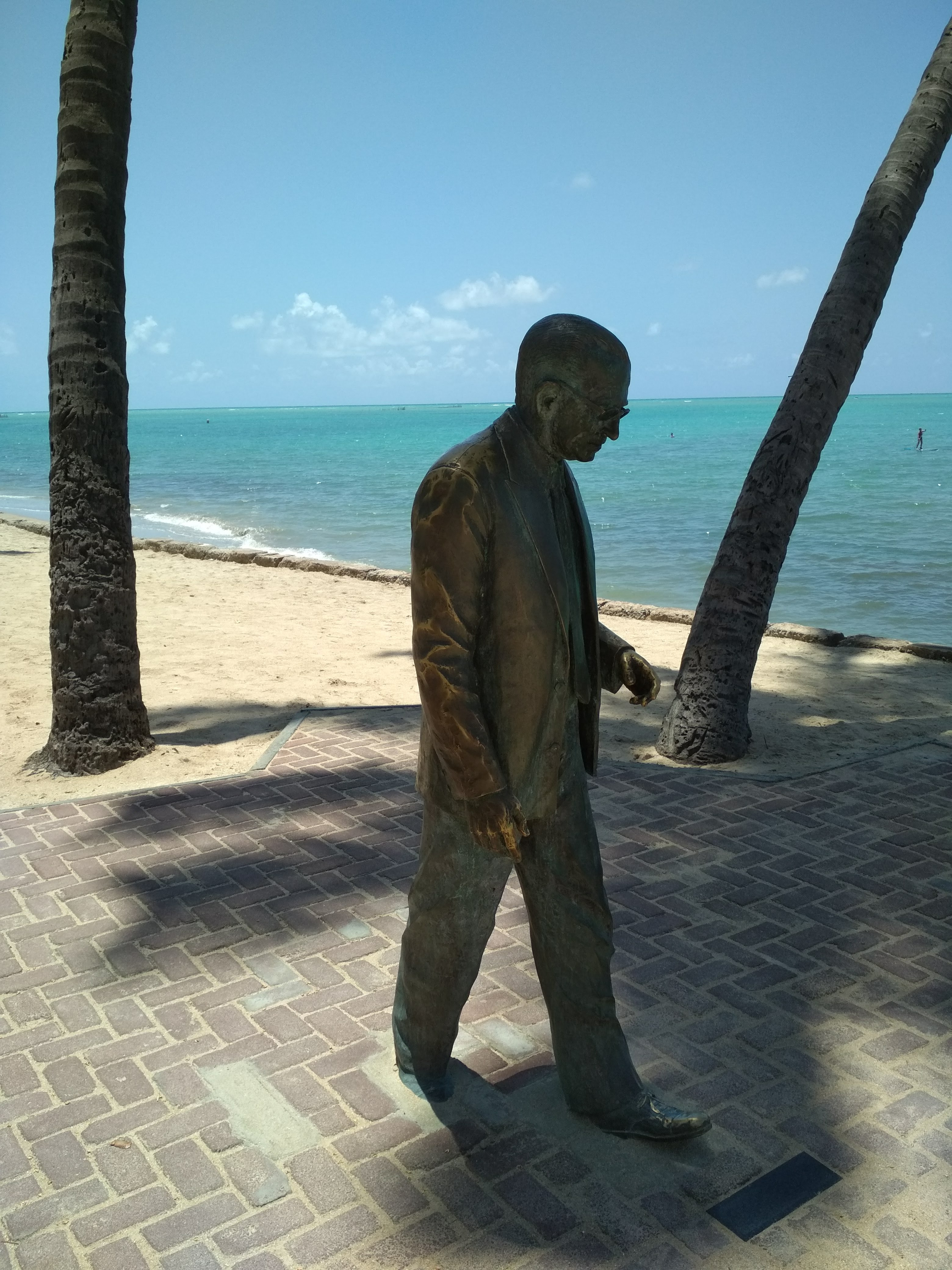
Bronze sculpture of Graciliano Ramos located on the beach of Ponta Verde in Maceió, Alagoas

=== Novels ===
- Caetés (1933)
- São Bernardo (1934)
- Angústia (Anguish) (1936)
- Vidas Secas (Barren Lives) (1938)
- Brandão Entre o Mar e o Amor (Brandão Between the Sea and Love) (1942 — written in partnership with Jorge Amado, José Lins do Rego, Aníbal Machado and Rachel de Queiroz)

=== Children's literature ===
- A Terra dos Meninos Pelados (The Naked Boys' Land) (novel — 1939)
- Histórias de Alexandre (Alexandre's Stories) (short story book — 1944)
- Alexandre e Outros Heróis (Alexandre and Other Heroes) (posthumous — 1962)

=== Short story books ===
- Histórias Incompletas (Unfinished Stories) (1946)
- Insônia (Insomnia) (1947)

=== Memoirs ===
- Infância (1945)
- Memórias do Cárcere (Memories from Incarceration) (posthumous, unfinished — 1953)
- Viagem (Travel) (posthumous — 1954)
- Viventes das Alagoas (Living People from Alagoas) (posthumous — 1962)

=== Chronicles ===
- Linhas Tortas (Squiggly Lines) (posthumous — 1962)

=== Translations ===
- Up from Slavery by Booker T. Washington
- The Plague by Albert Camus

=== Miscellaneous ===
- Garranchos (Scribbles) (posthumous — 2012; collection of previously unpublished texts of different genres by Ramos, compiled by Thiago Mio Salla)

== Film adaptations ==
Ramos had four of his works adapted to cinema:

- Vidas Secas, a 1963 film by Nelson Pereira dos Santos.
- S. Bernardo, a 1971 film by Leon Hirszman.
- Insônia, a 1982 anthology film composed by three shorts adapted from Ramos' eponymous book, directed by Emmanuel Cavalcanti, Luiz Paulino dos Santos, and Nelson Pereira dos Santos, which had previously adapted Vidas Secas.
- Memórias do Cárcere, a 1984 film also by Nelson Pereira dos Santos. Carlos Vereza portrayed Ramos in this film.

== Public domain ==
The work of Graciliano Ramos entered the public domain on January 1, 2024, after the 70th anniversary of the author's death, according to Brazilian law. However, the family disputed this due to the fact that the author, at the time, still had a living daughter and maintained that, according to the Civil Code of 1916, the work remains protected for as long as she might have lived after 2024. For this reason, they signed a contract with Editora Record that will last until January 2029. However, it is uncertain whether the copyright will continue to be protected and according to Sonia Jardim, President of Record Group, in 2024 "there may be two editions of Vidas Secas in the market". However, the last surviving daughter of Graciliano Ramos died in 2022. At the end of December 2023, the family announced that they would comply with Brazilian law.
