= The Underdogs (novel) =

1920 novel by Mexican author Mariano Azuela

- Title page for Los de abajo (1939 edition)
- Author: Mariano Azuela
- Original title: Los de abajo
- Illustrator: José Clemente Orozco
- Language: Spanish
- Publisher: Brentano's 1929 (First translation based on 1920 edition) Principia Press Trinity University 1963 (new translation based on 1920 edition) University of California Press 1979 (translation based on the original 1915 version) Penguin 2008 (Based on 1920 edition) Signet 2016 (Reprint of Brentano’s 1929 edition)
- Publication date: 1915 as newspaper episodes 1920 edited, expanded and published by Author
- Publication place: Mexico
- English publication date: 1929
- Pages: 232

The Underdogs (Spanish: Los de abajo) is a novel by Mexican author Mariano Azuela which tells the story of a group of commoners who are dragged into the Mexican Revolution and the changes in their psyche due to living through the conflict. It is heavily influenced by the author's experiences during the revolution, where he participated as a medical officer for Pancho Villa's Northern Division. The novel was the first of its kind to be translated into English, as part of a project sponsored by the Mexican Government and the Mexican Renaissance intellectual movement to promote Mexico as a literature-creating country. It had been previously well received by American critics like Earl K. James from the New York Times in 1928 so the translation project went on and was released in 1929 by Brentano's Books, at the time, the largest bookstore chain in the US. It has been considered "The Novel of the Mexican Revolution" since 1924, when journalist Francisco Monterde wrote about it for the Excélsior as an example of virile and modern post-revolutionary literature.

== Synopsis ==
The book tells us the story of Demetrio Macías, a peasant who, after having a misunderstanding with a local cacique (land owner), is hunted by national government soldiers (Federales) and decides to flee when they arrive at his home and kill his dog, prompting him to abandon his family and take revenge. He escapes to the mountains and forms a group of rebels who support the Mexican Revolution.

The whole novel has various reading levels and the character names represent forces or ideals beyond the characters themselves. Some of them are prototypes of the kind of people that were dragged into the revolution, like Demetrio, whose name is associated with the goddess of farming and agriculture Demeter; La Pintada (translated as War paint) a tough woman; and Camila, a teenager peasant who is dragged into the conflict by means of subterfuge to become Macías's lover. Others symbolize revolutionary hopes and conflicts, like Luis Cervantes, an educated man (whose name evokes Miguel de Cervantes) mistreated by the Federales and therefore turning on them, and Güero Margarito, a cruel man who finds justification for his deeds in the turbulence of the times. Macías's dog, killed at the beginning, is a symbol of peace, fittingly named Palomo (dove).

With a concise, unsympathetic tone, Azuela takes the reader along with this band of outcasts as they move along the hills of the country, seemingly struggling for a cause whose leader changes from day to night. The rebels, not very certain of what or whom they are fighting for, practice the abuse and injustice they used to suffer in the hands of the old leaders. So the Mexican people, as the title of the book hints, are always the "ones below", no matter who runs the country.

In the end, Macías has lost his cherished ones and most of his men, and reunites with his family with no real desire or hope for redemption or peace. He has forebodings of his destiny, and the last scene of the book leaves him firing his rifle with deathly accuracy, alone and extremely outnumbered by his enemies.

== Characters ==
- Demetrio Macías: He is a tall and well-built man with a sanguine face and beardless chin. He wears a shirt and trouser of white cloth, broad Mexican hat, and leather sandals. He leads a group of men fighting against the federal forces of Victoriano Huerta. He is famous for his marksmanship and his ability to lead men in battle. Many poor peasants he meets throughout his journey protest against the Federales because they burn their houses, take their wives, their stock, and their food. His dog is killed in one of the most iconic and melodramatic scenes in the novel. It depicts a moment of helplessness, a recurring theme throughout the book. Macias and his band of men travel great lengths and loot and sack villages throughout their journey in order to stay alive. They rape many Mexican women and hang dozens of men. Macias also has a semi-sexual encounter with another man that changes the essence of his character throughout the rest of the novel. At the beginning of the novel, he fights to change his country; at the end he does not know why he continues to fight, and compares his actions to that of a pebble he throws into a canyon. Many of Macías' men forget what they are fighting for, and as time goes by start to concentrate more on their own needs.
- Luis Cervantes: The newest member of Demetrio's band of rebels. He was conscripted to fight in the Federale Army, but deserts when he was offended. Different from the rest of the band, Cervantes is educated and well-mannered, as he is a medical student and journalist. Towards the end of the novel he flees the country to go to the United States. His story is said to be similar to the author's. However, in many interviews Azuela has stated his voice is not represented by the life of Cervantes but rather Solis.
- War Paint (original name: La Pintada): She is a tough woman who represents a real class of women that took part in the conflict, the Soldaderas. She is a woman who challenges men, does not get scared when a man shoots closely at her, swears, shakes hands with virile strength, rides open-legged, teases Demetrio, and fights with a revolver she keeps on her chest. The original name refers to a type of aggressive hen, and she has been pointed out by many to represent the new women who were fighting the patriarchal society in Mexico.
- Camila: She is a teenager who is deceived by Luis Cervantes to join Demetrio's band. She is in love with the former and, although her kind and stoic nature represents the servile and subdued women before the revolution, she is a tragic character who ends fatally in conflict with La Pintada.

== Translations ==
The first and most important translation of this novel, which coined the debated title The Underdogs, is officially attributed to Enrique Munguía Jr., a Mexican diplomat stationed in Washington in 1928. However, it has been recently rediscovered that Anita Brenner, a Mexican-American author and prominent supporter of Mexican arts during this era, also participated in the translation. As well as bringing this edition to life, she is likely to have undertaken the most part or even directed the translation. Munguia being simply a facade for the Mexican Government. This theory is supported by her known participation in translating other Azuela novels, such as Marcela. There is no evidence of any other translations in which Munguia participated.

The first edition of The Underdogs was published by Brentano's in 1929, which was the largest bookstore in the US, with branches in four American cities as well as London and Paris. The original print run was 3,000, and the book's preface was written by the influential American journalist Carleton Beals. Illustrations were drawn by José Clemente Orozco, one of the most famous muralists of the era. There is strong evidence suggesting that the whole translation project was a part of a wider effort to create a new international image of Mexico as a modern and cultural country, initiated by the Mexican President Plutarco Elías Calles and supported by the Mexican Renaissance, a movement of intellectuals, artists and writers (including Mariano Azuela). The role of Brenner who had coined the term Mexican Renaissance in her book Idols Behind Altars is generally uncredited, although writings from that work point to her being the hub and intellectual author of the whole project.

The first edition was an astounding success, receiving mostly positive critics from the Americans and even from the author himself, even if many questioned the name given as they think it didn't capture the true meaning of the expression Los de Abajo in Spanish, related more to the oppressed, the poor ones, those without privileges and the underdogs. About the reviews, Timothy Murad wrote:

"Ernest Gruening, writing in the Nation, considered the translation well done: Enrique Munguía, Jr. has performed creditably the task of rendering the almost untranslatable Mexican-Aztec argot into readable English." Isaac Goldberg, in The New World Monthly agreed: "Mr. Munguia's version . . . appears to have managed with unobtrusive skill the difficult task not only of translating, but what we might call ‘trans-psyching’ the story."

About the title, Murad added:

"The objections to 'The Underdogs' for 'Los de Abajo' are indicative of the difficulties posed in the translation of the title. Strictly speaking, and dependent on context, 'los de abajo' as 'those from below,' or 'those underneath.' or 'those down below,' could refer as well to neighbors on the floor below or down the street as to a book on a bottom shelf. To a degree, when Azuela coined the phrase he intended the socio-cultural and political meanings (the poor, the lower classes, the uneducated, the powerless, the downtrodden) that are inextricably linked to its use as the title of the novel."

The book became well known as Earl K. James suggested in 1932

"Waldo Frank in his foreword to this story of love, lust and revenge south of the Rio Grande, calls Mariano Azuela 'one of the most eminent novelists of contemporary Mexico.' Azuela is a doctor by profession and a revolutionary by conviction. Nor do his literary activities keep him from the pursuit of his profession or from working for social justice within a modest sphere. American readers may remember his 'The Underdogs.' The best novel of the Diaz Revolution of 1910 to appear here."

Despite such shortcomings, the novel opened the American readers' doors to other Mexican and Latin-American novels and it became the base reference against others were compared, as suggested in the a review by Frank C, Hanighen in 1934:

"With the advent of Gregorio Lopez y fuentes's 'Tierra, La Revolución Agraria en México' a new Mexican novelist has arrived, for many years the colorful Marion Azuela, author of 'The Underdogs' and 'Marcela' dominated the scene"

Since the first edition, the book has been translated again into English, a second translation by Frances Kellam Hendricks and Beatrice Berler was published in 1963 by Principia Press Trinity University, but it did not reach a widespread audience. Stanley L. Robe published in 1979 also offered a new translation published by the University of California Press based on the original 1915 serial edition. A centenary translation was done by Ilan Stavans and Anna Moore for The Underdogs: A Norton Critical Edition. The Hackett Publishing Company edition, The Underdogs: with Related Texts, translated by Gustavo Pellón, also included contemporary reviews of Azuela's book, an excerpt from Anita Brenner's Idols Behind Altars (1929), and selections from John Reed's Insurgent Mexico (1914). Segio Weisman did another translation for Penguin Books in 2008. Still, the most current edition by Signet, uses the original translation by Munguia and Anita Brenner, as do most of the e-book versions available for Kindle.
