= Mexican Renaissance =

Mexican Renaissance refers to the Mexican muralism movement between 1920 and 1950. The phrase was first used in Idols behind Altars by Anita Brenner, with Jean Charlot. Charlot also discussed it in his 1963 book, The Mexican Mural Renaissance:

There are some simplifications which have become history, and one of them is the tie, which in itself is quite true, between the Mexican Renaissance, so called, and the Mexican Revolution. By Renaissance I speak mainly of the mural period of the 1920s and of the muralists, and of course, the Revolution is the Revolution of 1910, mostly military and a rather bloody affair.

— Jean Charlot
