= Anita Brenner =

Mexican-American scholar and writer

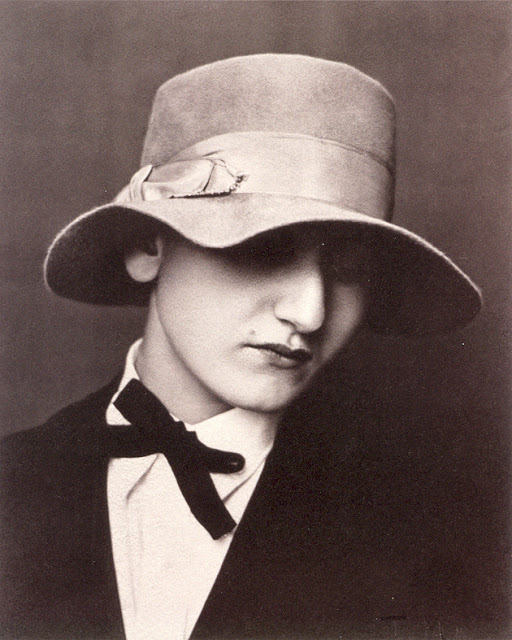
- Born: Hanna Brenner; 13 August 1905; Aguascalientes, Mexico
- Died: 1 December 1974 (aged 69); Ojuelos de Jalisco, Mexico
- Occupations: Writer, anthropologist
- Spouse: David Glusker (m. 1930; sep. 1951)
- Children: 2

- Anita Brenner photographed by Tina Modotti
- mfa.org/693495
- profile, suit, 1925
- Portrait, 1925 (3/4 profile)

- Anita Brenner, photographed
- Anita Brenner by Edward Weston
- Brenner, behind her desk
- Brenner, smoking

Anita Brenner (born Hanna Brenner; 13 August 1905 – 1 December 1974) was a transnational Jewish scholar and intellectual, who wrote extensively in English about the art, culture, and history of Mexico. She was born in Mexico, and raised and educated in the United States. She returned to Mexico in the 1920s following the Mexican Revolution. She coined the term 'Mexican Renaissance', "to describe the cultural florescence [that] emerged from the revolution." As a child of immigrants, Brenner's heritage caused her to experience both antisemitism and acceptance. Fleeing discrimination in Texas, she found mentors and colleagues among the European Jewish diaspora living in both Mexico and New York, but Mexico, not the US or Europe, held her loyalty and enduring interest. She was part of the post-Revolutionary art movement known for its indigenista ideology.

Brenner earned a PhD in anthropology at Columbia University and her first book, Idols Behind Altars was the first book to document the artworks, styles and artists of Mexico from Prehistory through the 1920s. It was widely considered her most important work and was filled with photographs by renowned photographers and interviews with the most influential and prolific artists of the period. Her fourth published book was The Wind That Swept Mexico; The History of the Mexican Revolution, 1910-1942, having in between printed a guidebook and a children's story. The first book to give a complete account in either English or Spanish on the Mexican Revolution, it was the first to retell the events from a Mexican perspective.

== Early life ==
Anita Brenner was born 13 August 1905 in Aguascalientes, Mexico, to Isador and Paula Brenner. Her birth name was registered as Hanna. Her parents were Jewish emigrants to Mexico from Latvia, and her father moved his family back and forth from Mexico to Texas during the Mexican Revolution.

In 1916, when Brenner was 11, " to escape the 1910 Mexican Revolution", the family settled in San Antonio, Texas, but Brenner's nanny influenced her enduring passion for Mexico. She graduated from Main Avenue High School, briefly attended Our Lady of the Lake University and then took an English course with J. Frank Dobie at the University of Texas at Austin and worked at The Daily Texan. After two semesters she was able to persuade her father to let her return to Mexico, since she felt excluded by her university peers because of their antisemitism. After her father had secured promises from Joseph Weinberger, of B'nai B'rith, a Jewish service organization, and his wife Frances Toor that they would look after her, Isador agreed to let Anita go.

Brenner moved to Mexico around the age of 18 and settled in Mexico City. Frances Toor introduced Brenner to the community of international artists, refugees, and intellectuals then residing in the capital. Brenner became an important member of this cosmopolitan circle and was an important link among them. She was also an important voice for bringing the Mexican artistic florescence to the attention of readers in the U.S., effectively representing it north of the Mexican border. For the first time in her life, Brenner felt accepted and began to explore her Jewish roots. She worked for a brief period at B'nai B'rith, meeting recent Jewish immigrants at the port of Veracruz and helping them with their paperwork and resettlement. Brenner quickly became part of the leftist bohemian group and as a journalist was a key voice in the indigenismo movement.

Carleton Beals and Ernest Gruening were influential U.S. journalists whom Brenner met in this early period of her career. Beals helped her launch her publishing career. She was Gruening's research assistant for his book, Mexico and Its Heritage, which he spent five years developing in Mexico before it was published in 1928. In 1924, her first published article was "The Jew in Mexico," published by The Nation, which Gruening had edited from 1920-1923.

President Plutarco Elías Calles (1924–28) offered Brenner her a scholarship to participate in the cultural preservation program. At that time in Mexico, the Secretariat of Education (SEP) had established a cultural missions program, which began in 1923, where young people traveled the country and helped preserve indigenous culture. Concha Michel, a friend of Anita's, participated in a similar program and gathered indigenous folk songs. In 1926, Brenner commissioned her friends Tina Modotti and Edward Weston to travel with her and take photographs for her upcoming book on Mexican decorative arts. The National Autonomous University of Mexico provided funding for a two-volume series in which Brenner planned to document artworks in Guanajuato, Jalisco, Michoacan, Oaxaca, Puebla and Querétaro.

Modotti and Weston also took personal photographs of Brenner. The differences between them point to the different aesthetics of the photographers. Weston was known for the abstract qualities of his highly focused and "precisely composed black-and-white images of semi-abstract nudes, landscapes, and organic forms". His photographs of Brenner's back are devoid of human interest and a study of form. Modotti attempted to capture scenes and personality, and social context over form were emphasized. Her photographs of Brenner show her dressed in a man's suit and fedora. Though feminists of later decades saw these photographs as uninhibited gender expression, Brenner was discreet about her sexuality, and like most of the female artists of the period, was not a feminist. Their works questioned their personal restrictions, but not as an expressly feminist statement.

== New York years ==
In 1927, Brenner left Mexico for New York to attend Columbia University. She had served as translator and editor for Manuel Gamio, a leading Mexican anthropologist, and was encouraged to pursue a doctorate by Franz Boas, the "founding father of American anthropology". In 1929, she was finally able to publish her book on Mexican artwork, but instead of the two volumes originally planned, she published one volume entitled Idols Behind Altars, with the New York trade publisher, Harcourt, Brace. The main premise of the book was that behind the Spanish "altars", visible Hispanic, Catholic culture, lay the "idols", the invisible authentic culture of indigenous Mexico, which the "Mexican Renaissance" was rediscovering. It was well received and is considered her most important work. It was the first attempt to permanently record art throughout the country, as well as analyze the works, styles and artists of Mexico. According to Katherine Anne Porter's review, it reads like a "who's who" of the Mexican art scene of the 1920s, including Abraham Ángel, Adolfo Best-Maugard, Jean Charlot, Xavier Guerrero, Carlos Mérida, Gerardo Murillo Cornado (aka Dr. Atl), José Clemente Orozco, Diego Rivera, and David Alfaro Siqueiros and explains the intricate interlacing of their community of foreigners, second generation emigrants, and native born artists who have restored the "Indian" imagery of Mexico.

Although she never finished a bachelor's or master's degree, and did not conduct field research at the site, in 1930, Brenner submitted her PhD dissertation in anthropology on the ancient site of Colhuacan. After her successful defense of her thesis, she completed her degree and was awarded a Guggenheim Fellowship in 1930 to study the geographical extent of Aztec art in Mexico and at various museums in Europe. In her travels throughout Europe, she wrote articles for The New York Times and served as a war correspondent during the Spanish Civil War.

Brenner's travels through Mexico with the fellowship resulted in a travel book entitled Your Mexican Holiday which was published in 1932. The next decade of her life was spent in the publication of hundreds of articles which appeared in "The Nation (seventeen articles) and the New York Times Sunday Magazine (twenty articles), Mademoiselle, and the Brooklyn Daily Eagle (fifty articles), as well as stories of Mexican art, culture, refugees and politics which were chronicled in the Jewish press – The Menorah Journal, the Jewish Morning Journal, The Jewish Daily Forward, and the Jewish Telegraphic Agency.

During this period, Brenner helped many of Mexico's artists expand their U.S. audiences. She introduced José Clemente Orozco to Alma Reed, who helped plan his first New York showing and guided his career. Brenner and Orozco later had a falling out. She wrote reviews and helped with the translation of Mariano Azuela's The Underdogs, which sold 3,000 copies. She promoted the work of Diego Rivera, though they at times had a contentious relationship, as well as Carlos Mérida and David Alfaro Siqueiros.

== Politics ==
Many of the Mexican artists of the post-Revolutionary decades accepted that the government endorsement of using art to educate the largely uneducated public was a tacit approval to produce art heavily reflecting communist ideology. Revolutionary themes and communism combined in many works of the period. But the 1930s were turbulent times, Mexican communists were sometimes embraced and sometimes not embraced by their US and Soviet counterparts. Brenner was a sympathizer, like others Mexican avant–garde artists, who were sometimes Communist Party members and sometimes not. In 1926 when the journal New Masses was launched, Brenner was classed as a fellow traveler, but not a party member.

As an independent reporter in Spain, Brenner evaluated the Russian role in the Spanish Civil War. She found evidence that the Gosudarstvennoye Politicheskoye Upravlenie (GPU), the Russian secret police, intimidated anarchists and socialists in an effort to silence critics of the Comintern and she criticized Stalin's move away from helping workers and into Marxist factionalism. In the view she supported, Joseph Stalin would be the only one to benefit from the adoption of Communism by the Spanish Government. In 1934 Anita and 24 others signed an open letter on their anti-Stalin stance and received negative reviews from New Masses, which had become the leading Communist journal, branding her a Trotskyist. She responded in an individual letter stating that the role of the intellectual was to question and criticize. By stifling criticism, the Communist Party was refusing to allow intellectuals to do their jobs.

Brenner occasionally wrote under a pseudonym "Jean Mendez" for Troskyist newspapers. In 1936, it was Brenner who sent a telegram from New York to Diego Rivera asking him to use his influence to find Leon Trotsky a safe haven in Mexico. Trotsky had been in exile for nine years, and Norway was in the process of expelling him. Brenner, on behalf of the Trotskyite Fourth International, asked Rivera to assist in the crisis and secure asylum. Rivera immediately contacted President Lázaro Cárdenas and secured the necessary agreement.

== Return to Mexico ==
Brenner, with her husband and two children, emigrated to Mexico in 1940, to the farm in Aguascalientes her family had left when they moved to Texas. She re-established it for specialty agricultural produce and grew asparagus and garlic.

Brenner continued to publish in the U.S. and renewed her lifelong friendship with Jean Charlot to collaborate on several children's books. In 1943 she published her fourth book, The Wind That Swept Mexico, for which she wrote the text, with George R. Leighton, publishing the vivid photos. which was the first complete account in either the English–language or Spanish recounting the events that occurred during the Mexican Revolution.

It was also the first telling in English that gave a Mexican perspective of the conflict. Many versions of the events of the war had been printed in the US, but mainly those were journalism pieces which negatively reported on events in Mexico. In particular, pieces by William Randolph Hearst's papers were designed to arouse anti-Mexican feeling to protect his own land holdings in Mexico. Brenner defended Mexico's right to determine its own path without foreign intervention. The book was widely acclaimed at the time, and was received well when it was reprinted in the 1970s.

In 1955, Brenner established a monthly tourist magazine, Mexico/This Month (1955-1971). Her familiarity with both Mexico and the U.S. gave her the expertise to make Mexico known to an English-speaking public. When the Mexican government awarded her the Order of the Aztec Eagle, the highest honor Mexico can award a non-national, she refused it, on the grounds that she was Mexican by birth. She did accept a citation as a distinguished tourism pioneer awarded by former president Miguel Alemán Valdés in 1967.

== Personal life ==
In July 1930, Brenner married David Glusker, from whom she separated in 1951, ten years prior to his death in 1961. She had two children, a daughter, Dr. Susannah Joel Glusker (1939-2013), who taught at the Universidad Iberoamericana in Mexico City, and a son, Dr. Peter Glusker (1936–2020), a physician who had a medical practice in Fort Bragg, California.

She died in Ojuelos de Jalisco, 83 kilometres (52 mi) east of Aguascalientes, in an automobile accident on 1 December 1974, aged 69.

== Legacy ==
Two posthumous volumes were released after Brenner's death, by Susannah Joel Glusker, Brenner's daughter. Avant-Garde Art & Artists in Mexico, 2-Volume Set: Anita Brenner's Journals of the Roaring Twenties was prepared using diaries and notes Brenner had made and span the period from 1925 until her marriage in 1930 and photographs from Brenner's files. Some of the photographs were taken by Modotti and Weston for Idols behind Altars and also some images by Máximo Pacheco and Orozco that had not previously been published. Susannah Glusker wrote a biography of her mother entitled Anita Brenner: A Mind of Her Own.

Brenner remains an important figure in post-Revolutionary art and history in Mexico, an enthusiast for Mexican art and culture and an active advocate for its importance to a U.S. audience. A prolific scholar and journalist herself, she has been the subject of studies by Mexicanist scholars. The Skirball Cultural Center in Los Angeles hosted an exhibition focusing on Brenner in 2017-18, entitled "Another Promised Land: Anita Brenner's Mexico."

== Selected works ==
- Idols behind altars. New York: Payson & Clarke Ltd. 1929. OCLC 988185482 – via Internet Archive. Reprinted: ISBN 9780486145754
- The influence of technique on the decorative style in the domestic pottery of Cultuacan. Columbia Univ. Pr. 1930. OCLC 255549128. Doctoral dissertation: OCLC 492626463 Reprinted: ISBN 9780404505639
- "The Jew in Mexico". The Nation. 119 (3086): 211–212. 1924-08-27. hdl:2027/uc1.b000550790. ISSN 0027-8378. OCLC 818916215.
- "Making Mexico Jew Conscious". The Nation. 133: 252–254. September 9, 1931. ISSN 0027-8378. OCLC 818916215.
- Your Mexican holiday : a modern guide. maps and illustrations by Carlos Mérida. New York and London: G.P. Putnam's Sons. 1932. OCLC 651365263.
- "The Idols Are Not Forgotten". Mexican Life. 8. 1932. OCLC 269236280.
- "Art: Revolution in Art". The Nation. 136 (3531). March 8, 1933. ISSN 0027-8378. OCLC 818916215.
- "Art: American Folkways". The Nation. June 13, 1934. ISSN 0027-8378. OCLC 818916215.
- Brenner, Anita (10 April 1938). "AMERICAN CREATES AMERICAN MURALS; To Bid for the Favor of a New Mass Public AMERICA DEVELOPS AN AMERICAN MURAL ART". The New York Times.
- "Mexico in Transition". New York Times Magazine. January 15, 1939. ISSN 0028-7822. OCLC 137344843.
- "The Mexican Renaissance: Its Rise and Eclipse". Harper's. Vol. 182, no. 22. January 1941. OCLC 60617860.
- "All Americanos". Mexican Life. 18. June 1942. OCLC 269236280.
- The boy who could do anything, & other Mexican folk tales. Illustrated by Jean Charlot. New York: W.R. Scott. 1942. OCLC 962897453. Reprinted: ISBN 9780208023537
- Brenner, Anita; Leighton, George Ross (1971). The wind that swept Mexico : the history of the Mexican revolution, 1910-1942. Austin: University of Texas Press. ISBN 9780292747555. OCLC 1151774262 – via Internet Archive.
- A hero by mistake. Illustrated by Jean Charlot. New York: William R. Scott, Inc. 1953. OCLC 1140660486 – via Internet Archive.
- Dumb Juan & the bandits. Illustrated by Jean Charlot. New York: William R. Scott, Inc. 1957. OCLC 906140041.
- The timid ghost : or, What would you do with a sackful of gold. Illustrated by Jean Charlot. New York: Young Scott Books. 1966. ISBN 9780201093711. OCLC 1036959499 – via Internet Archive.
- Brenner, Anita (2010). Glusker, Susannah Joel (ed.). Avant-garde art & artists in Mexico : Anita Brenner's journals of the roaring twenties. Austin: University of Texas Press. ISBN 9780292721845. OCLC 607656856.
- Brenner, Anita (2021). San José Vázquez, Eduardo (transl. and ed.). Hoy las barricadas. Crónicas de la Revolución Española, 1933-1937. Sevilla: Editorial Renacimiento. ISBN 9788418818844
