= Arturo Uslar Pietri =

Venezuelan writer

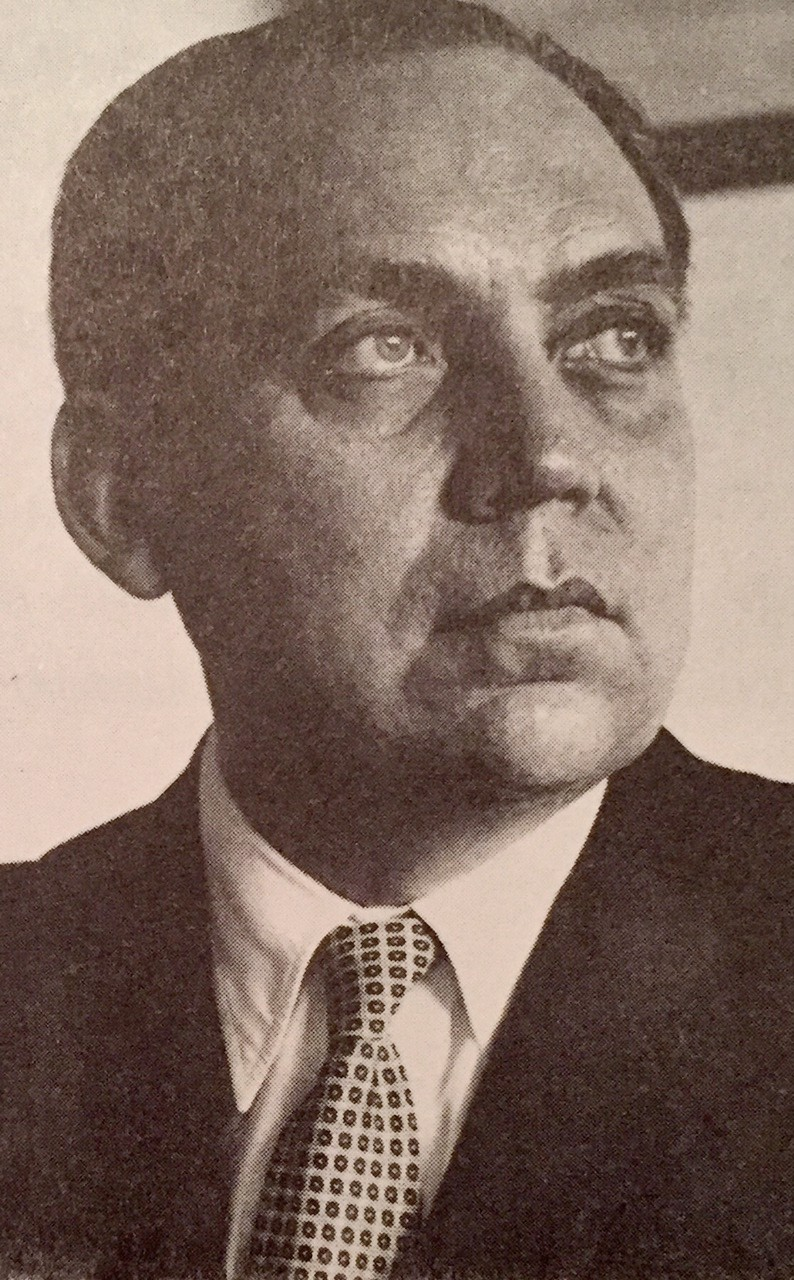
- Uslar Pietri in the 1970s
- Born: Arturo Uslar Pietri; 16 May 1906; Caracas, Venezuela
- Died: 26 February 2001 (aged 94); Caracas, Venezuela
- Resting place: Cementerio del Este, Caracas
- Citizenship: Venezuelan
- Education: Law, Political Science
- Alma mater: Central University of Venezuela
- Occupations: Novelist, essayist, lawyer, journalist, professor, politician
- Spouse: Isabel Braun Kerdel (m. 1939)
- Children: Arturo Uslar Braun, Federico Uslar Braun
- Relatives: Descendant of General Carlos Soublette and Johann von Uslar
- Writing career
- Language: Spanish
- Years active: 1923–1998
- Period: 1931–2001
- Genres: Novel, short story, essay
- Subjects: History, politics, Venezuelan society
- Notable works: Las lanzas coloradas, El camino de El Dorado, Oficio de difuntos
- Notable awards: Prince of Asturias Award for Literature (1990), National Prize for Literature (1954)
- Movements: Criollismo, Magic realism
- Website: www.casauslarpietri.org

Signature
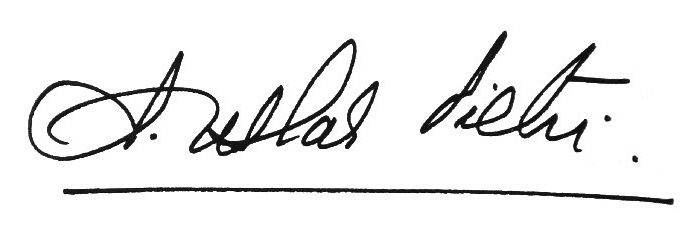

Arturo Uslar Pietri (16 May 1906 in Caracas – 26 February 2001) was a Venezuelan intellectual, historian, writer, television producer, and politician.

== Life ==
Born on 16 May 1906 in Caracas, Venezuela, his parents were general Arturo Uslar Santamaría and Helena Pietri de Uslar.

The last name Uslar is of German origin and can be traced back to Johann von Uslar, who fought for the rebel cause during Venezuela's independence wars.

As a young boy and then teenager, Arturo lived in various cities in the comparatively urbanised central northern valleys of the country. He moved back to Caracas in 1924 to read political sciences at the Central University of Venezuela, where he graduated Doctor of Political Sciences in 1929. That same year he obtained a law degree.

Uslar was influential in Venezuelan politics, historical analysis and literature, and as an educator. His period of activity spanned the last years of Venezuelan Caudillismo, the transition to democracy and most of the democratic era of 1958 - 1999. He held posts such as Secretary for the Venezuelan Delegation at the League of Nations, delegate at the International Labour Organization, minister of education, minister of finance, contributor to the Act of Constitution of the New Democratic Government (1958), ambassador to the United States, professor of Latin American literature at Columbia University, professor of political economics at the Central University of Venezuela, chief editor of a main newspaper, candidate for the Presidency and member of the Royal Spanish Academy.

Uslar Pietri had a lifetime involvement in the Venezuelan media as a cultural figure. He wrote regionally influential essays and novels, of which The Red Lances, an account of life during the Venezuelan War of Independence from various social perspectives is arguably the most famous. In his works he championed mestizaje, or miscegenation, as a valuable feature of Latin American culture. His literary output was recognised in 1990 with a Prince of Asturias Award. He was several times nominated for the Nobel Prize in Literature.

Uslar Pietri died on 26 February 2001 in Caracas. He had announced his retirement as an author in 1998 and last figured prominently in political debate in 1993.

=== Childhood and youth ===
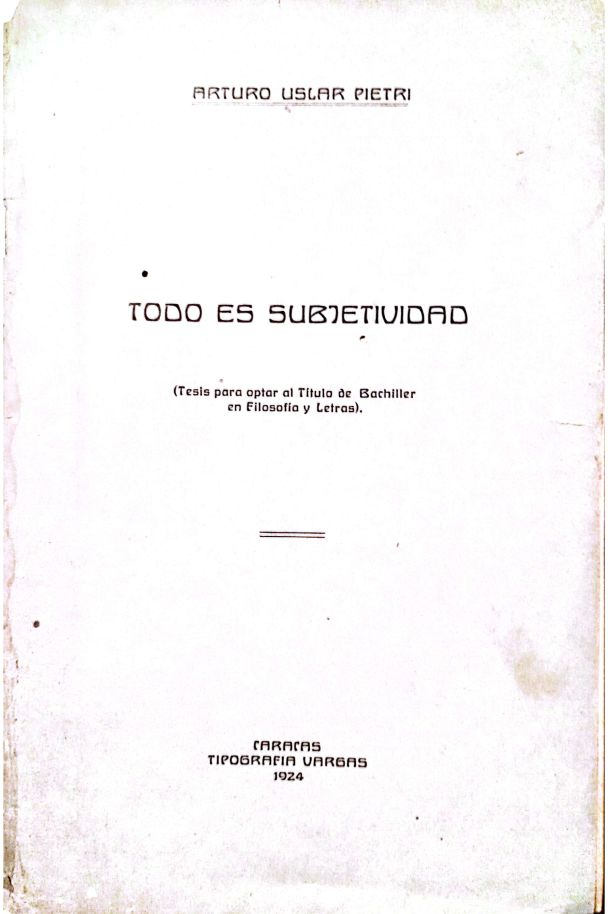
Thesis by Arturo Uslar Pietri to obtain the title of Bachelor in Philosophy and Letters, presented in December 1923 and published the following year.

Arturo Uslar Pietri was born in Caracas on May 16, 1906, in a house located on Av. Este No. 2, between Romualda and Manduca. He was the son of Arturo Uslar Santamaría and Helena Pietri Paúl de Uslar, daughter of Doctor and General Juan Pietri Pietri. Among his ancestors are Johann von Uslar, a German officer who fought in the Battle of Waterloo and for the Venezuelan War of Independence, General Carlos Soublette and Juan Pietri Pietri.

Although it is common to hear and read Arturo Uslar's surname as a paroxytone ([úslar]), it actually comes from the name of his ancestor, the German soldier Johann von Uslar (1779–1866). In German, Uslar is pronounced as an oxytone word.

Uslar Pietri's early years were spent in Caracas, where he studied at a primary school — the Escuela Unitaria de Alejandro Alvarado — and then at the French Fathers’ school — located at the Mijares corner. In August 1916, the Uslar Pietri family settled in Cagua for a few months, as his father had been appointed civil chief, and then moved to Maracay, the city of residence of General Juan Vicente Gómez since 1913, which made it the center of political and military power at that time. Uslar himself commented on the matter:

It was impossible not to see him. I do not exactly remember the first time I managed to catch a glimpse of him. But we all knew he went out twice a day. A walk in the morning and another at five in the afternoon. Crossing dusty roads. Visiting pastures. His presence was inevitable. In a touring car, with a canvas top. At less than 40 kilometers per hour. Without escorts or motorcycles. No paraphernalia. Followed only by a car with his aides.

Pietri completed his primary studies at the Colegio Federal Felipe Guevara Rojas (1919) and attended most of secondary school at the Colegio Federal de Varones, except for an interruption in 1921 when he was enrolled at the Colegio de los Salesianos in Valencia and in 1923 when he completed his last year of secondary education at the Liceo San José in Los Teques.

=== University stage ===
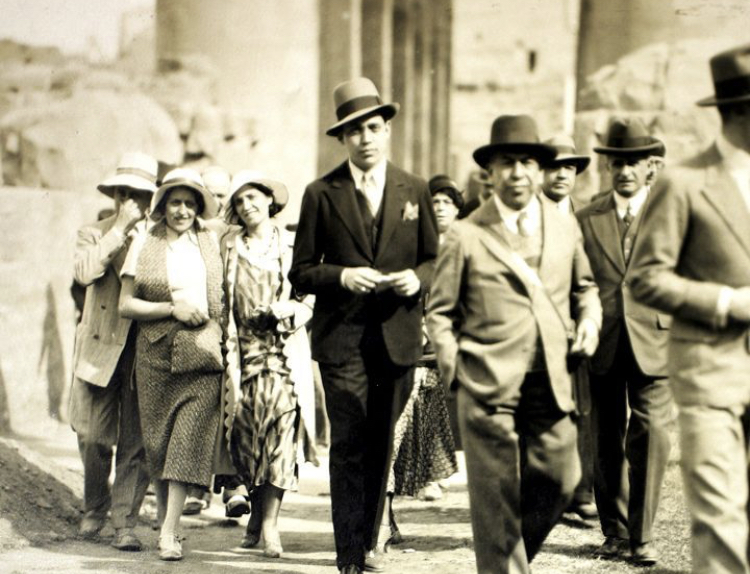
The young Uslar Pietri during a trip to Egypt in 1931.

In June 1923, the first narrative work by this author emerged, a short story entitled "El silencio del desierto", which first appeared in the pages of Billiken magazine. In October of the same year, he decided to return to the city of Caracas with the aim of beginning studies in Law, which at that time was the only academic path for individuals inclined toward the humanities or literature. He enrolled in the School of Political Science, a renowned educational institution attached to the Central University of Venezuela.

Like many other young people from provincial regions, during the first years of his university life, he lived in boarding houses. In January 1924, he achieved a relevant academic milestone by obtaining his bachelor's degree in Philosophy, which was awarded to him after the successful presentation and defense of his thesis entitled "Todo es subjetividad".

The university stage of his life is characterized by fervent and diverse activity: he actively joined the Law Students’ Center and the Venezuelan Students’ Federation. In 1925, he assumed the responsibility of librarian for the aforementioned federation, delivered his first lecture entitled "Ideas sobre una morfología de la historia del Derecho", and saw his short stories published in the magazine "La Universidad" in 1927. During this time, he established links with some of the members of the Generation of 1928 who would later take part in the emblematic student events of 1928.

In the professional field, between 1926 and 1929, he worked as a clerk at the Civil Court of First Instance of the Federal District, and occasionally held the same position in the National Congress. Like many young men of his generation, he delved into exploring new literary and intellectual currents, finding in La Gaceta Literaria and Revista de Occidente windows to new ideological and aesthetic perspectives.

He attended various gatherings, environments conducive to the flow of ideas, the sharing of aspirations and the meeting of generations from different eras. In these discussion and analysis circles, the past, present, and future of literary and philosophical tradition intertwined. Likewise, at the Vargas printing house — publisher of the prestigious magazine "Elite" — he gathered with the new literary generation, particularly with the exponents of avant-garde movements, which sought to break with traditional structures and explore new forms of expression in art and literature.

=== Beginning of his literary career ===
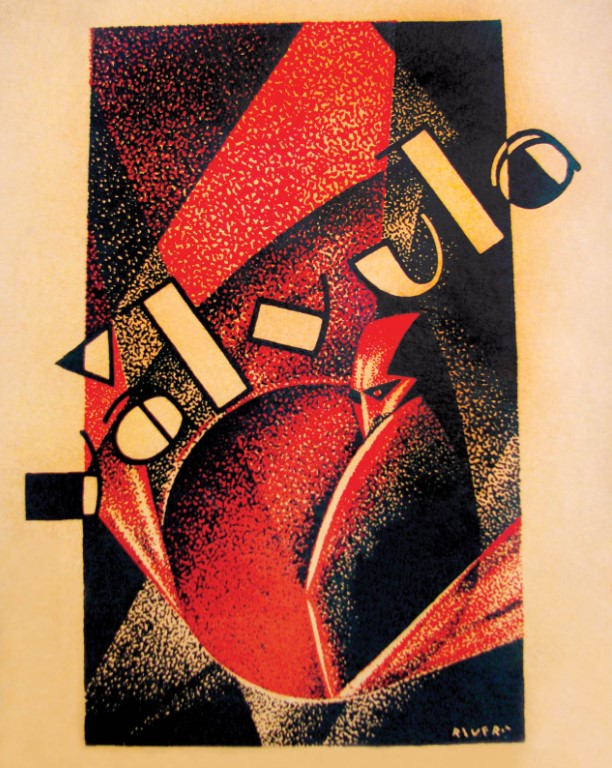
Cover of the avant-garde magazine Válvula (1928).

In 1930, two events took place that marked Venezuelan literary and political history. In the first, Uslar Pietri played a leading role: on January 5 of that year, the first and only issue of the magazine Válvula was published, in which, although 29 collaborators participated, Uslar wrote four of the included texts, among them the editorial "Somos" and the article "Forma y Vanguardia", considered the programmatic pieces of the avant-garde movement; and in September he published his first short story book, Barrabás y otros relatos. Specialists agree that both publications constitute a dividing point in Venezuelan literature. On July 29, 1929, he received the title of Doctor in Political Science from the Central University, after presenting a thesis entitled "El principio de la no imposición de la nacionalidad de origen", and on August 6, the title of lawyer, granted by the Supreme Court of the Federal District.

In 1931, he published his first novel, Las lanzas coloradas — a historical narrative set during the Venezuelan War of Independence. The work was well received and marked the beginning of a fruitful career.

=== Uslar Pietri and magical realism ===
Uslar Pietri is considered by critics to be one of the forerunners, as well as the introducer of the term magic realism into literature.

The term magic realism, which was first used by the German art critic Franz Roh to describe a painting that showed an altered reality, entered the Spanish language with the 1925 translation of the book Realismo mágico (Revista de Occidente, 1925). It was introduced into Latin American literature by Arturo Uslar Pietri in 1948 in his essay Letras y hombres de Venezuela (1948). Uslar states:

What came to predominate in the short story and to mark its imprint in a lasting way was the consideration of man as a mystery in the midst of realistic data. A poetic divination or a poetic negation of reality. What, for lack of a better word, may be called a magical realism.

Years earlier, in 1935, Uslar Pietri published his short story La Lluvia, in which he realistically and mysteriously recounts the arrival and disappearance, with the rain, of a strange visitor. This story is considered the first example of magic realism before the term was coined.

Critic Víctor Bravo points out that the notion of magic realism was born almost simultaneously with that of lo real maravilloso: "The initial formulation of one and the other notion—as a reference to a mode of Latin American literary production—was made almost simultaneously. In 1947, Arturo Uslar Pietri introduced the term 'magic realism' to refer to Venezuelan short stories; in 1949 Alejo Carpentier spoke of 'lo real maravilloso' to introduce the novel The Kingdom of This World, and some consider it to be the novel that inaugurated this literary trend.

=== Political life ===
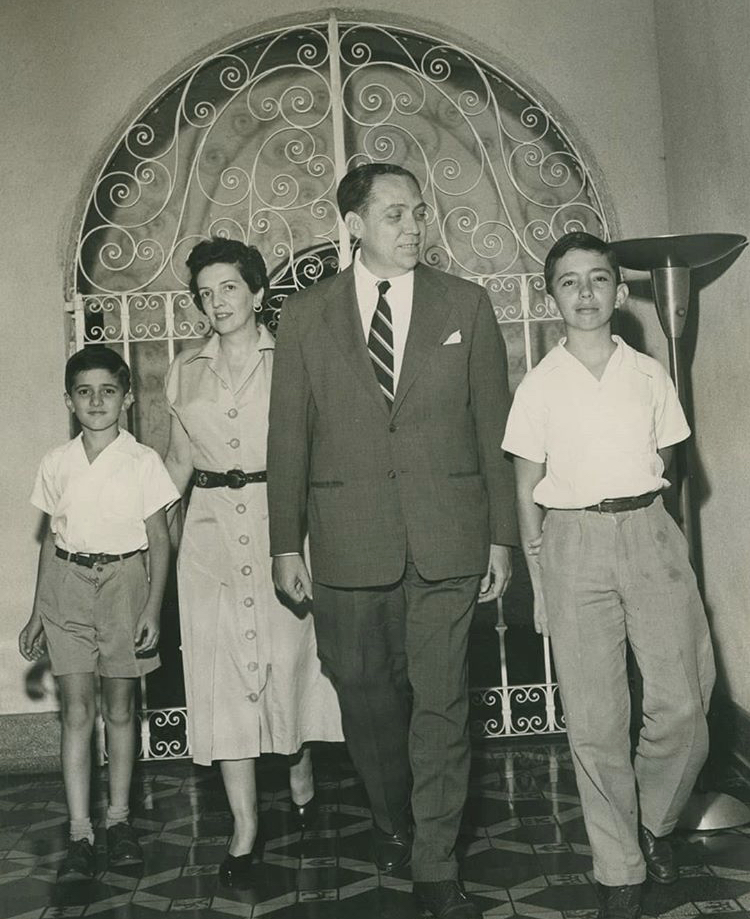
Uslar Pietri with his wife Isabel Braun, and their two children: Arturo and Federico Uslar Braun, c. 1950.

In 1936, Uslar Pietri became very active in political debate after the death of dictator Juan Vicente Gómez. In 1937, together with Manuel Egaña, Pastor Oropeza, Aurelio Arreaza Arreaza, Ramón Díaz Sánchez and Manuel Felipe Rugeles, he was one of the promoters of the short-lived Partido Agrario Nacional (National Agrarian Party).

In 1939, at the age of 33, he married Isabel Braun Kerdel, with whom he had two children, Arturo and Federico Uslar Braun. That same year, he was appointed Minister of Education. He founded the Partido Democrático Venezolano (Venezuelan Democratic Party) and became a member of Congress starting in 1944. In 1945, he was appointed Minister of Interior by President Isaías Medina Angarita.

The October 18, 1945 coup d'état forced him to leave the country and move to New York City. While in New York, he taught at Columbia University. Five years later, he returned to Venezuela. In 1950, Uslar Pietri was appointed as Venezuela's consular representative to Norway, Sweden and Denmark, and promoted the creation of a Child Immigration Committee in Caracas. That year, more than 200 applications were made by Caracas families to adopt Scandinavian war orphans following World War II. Between 1951 and 1958, he worked at the advertising agency ARS alongside Alejo Carpentier and as a professor of literature at the Central University of Venezuela. In January 1958, he was one of the signatories of the Manifiesto de los intelectuales, which criticized the Marcos Pérez Jiménez dictatorship and led to his arrest. After the fall of the dictatorship, he was elected senator for the Federal District the same year on the Unión Republicana Democrática (URD) list as an independent candidate. During this period of Venezuelan politics, it is clear that Uslar Pietri distanced himself from the social-democratic, Marxist, and Christian-democratic ideologies in Venezuela. What can be confirmed is that he refused to join the AD, Copei, and PCV parties, placing himself in a conservative and secular liberal space, a platform that became more evident during his presidential candidacy in 1963. In 1963, he was the candidate for the Comité Independiente Pro Frente Nacional (CIPFN) party in the presidential election, but was defeated by Raúl Leoni.

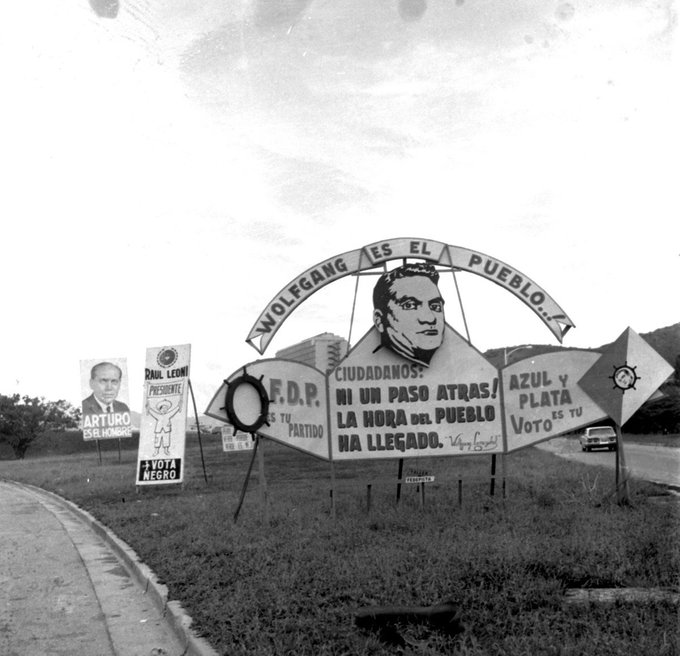
Banners during the 1963 Venezuelan general election.

After his defeat, he remained active as a senator. In May 1964, during a turbulent political context, he proposed to President-elect Raúl Leoni the formation of a Broad-Based Government, of which the Frente Nacional Democrático (FND) was a part until March 1966, when it withdrew due to disagreements over government policy. In the 1968 elections, together with Wolfgang Larrazábal of FDP and the Independent National Electoral Movement (MENI), Uslar supported the new political initiative of Jóvito Villalba of URD, called Frente de la Victoria, whose presidential candidate was Miguel Ángel Burelli Rivas, who ultimately lost to Rafael Caldera of Copei. Uslar resigned as secretary-general of the FND and gradually distanced himself from political life.

He became director of the newspaper El Nacional from 1969 until 1974, when he moved to Paris as Venezuelan ambassador to UNESCO. When he returned in 1979, he focused on his writing and education work, leaving active politics behind.

In 1972, in El Nacional and as a response to Kenneth Clark who, in his work Civilization produced by the BBC, left out the Hispanic countries from the creators of Western civilization, he published "Los expulsados de la civilización", for which he was awarded the Miguel de Cervantes Journalism Award (1973).

Uslar Pietri was a very familiar figure on television thanks to his weekly television program Valores humanos, focused on history and the arts, which began broadcasting on 25 November 1953 on Radio Caracas Televisión (RCTV). On Venevisión, he produced Raíces and Cuéntame a Venezuela about the country's historical development. In 1983, he resumed his program Valores Humanos, but this time produced by Venezolana de Televisión and broadcast by this channel and the Televisora Nacional.

During the second presidency of Carlos Andrés Pérez, Uslar Pietri led the group known as Los Notables, a group of intellectuals who proposed the implementation of several public reforms. The group later demanded the implementation of its proposals, called for the resignation or removal of Carlos Andrés Pérez, and criticized other state institutions. On 25 August 1991, Uslar Pietri proposed the creation of the position of prime minister, and on 3 December the group Los Notables published a second document complaining about the Executive and political parties for ignoring their demands for single-member elections and judicial reform. On 17 November, Uslar Pietri declared in an interview with El Nacional that if no answers were given to the Venezuelan crisis, a coup d'état could occur. On 1 December, Uslar Pietri again stated on the Primer Plano program on RCTV that "it would be idiotic to deny the possibility of a coup." After the February 1992 coup attempt, Uslar Pietri said that "it would be very serious to think" that the rebellious soldiers were just "crazy men who staged a prank" since, like other Venezuelans, they shared "a sovereign disgust with the way the government was functioning".

== Awards ==
- El Nacional Best Short Story Award (1949)
- National Prize for Literature (1954 and 1982)
- National Journalism Award (1971)
- The Miguel de Cervantes Hispanic-American Journalism Award (1972)
- Prince of Asturias Award (1990)
- Légion d'honneur Grand-Croix (Grand Cross) (1990)
- Rómulo Gallegos Prize for Best Novel (1991)

== Works ==
=== Novels ===
- (1931) Las lanzas coloradas (The Red Lances).
- (1947) El camino de El Dorado.
- (1962) Un retrato en la geografía.
- (1964) Estación de máscaras.
- (1976) Oficio de difuntos.
- (1981) La isla de Robinson.
- (1990) La visita en el tiempo.

==== Essays ====
- (1945) Las visiones del camino.
- (1945) Sumario de economía venezolana para alivio de estudiantes.
- (1948) Letras y hombres de Venezuela.
- (1949) De una a otra Venezuela.
- (1951) Las nubes.
- (1952) Apuntes para retratos.
- (1953) Tierra venezolana.
- (1954):Lecturas para jóvenes venezolanos
- (1955) El petróleo en Venezuela.
- (1955) Pizarrón.
- (1955-56-58) Valores humanos.
- (1955) Breve historia de la novela hispanoamericana.
- (1959) Materiales para la construcción de Venezuela.
- (1962) Del hacer y deshacer de Venezuela.
- (1962) Sumario de la Civilización Occidental.
- (1964) Valores humanos. Biografías y evocaciones.
- (1964) La palabra compartida. Discursos en el Parlamento (1959–1963).
- (1965) Hacia el humanismo democrático.
- (1966) Petróleo de vida o muerte.
- (1967) Oraciones para despertar.
- (1968) Las vacas gordas y las vacas flacas.
- (1969) En busca del nuevo mundo.
- (1971) Vista desde un punto.
- (1972) Bolivariana.
- (1974) La otra América.
- (1975) Viva voz.
- (1979) Fantasmas de dos mundos.
- (1981) Cuéntame a Venezuela.
- (1981) Educar para Venezuela.
- (1982) Fachas, fechas y fichas.
- (1983) Bolívar hoy.
- (1984) Venezuela en el petróleo.
- (1986) Medio milenio de Venezuela.
- (1986) Raíces venezolanas.
- (1986) Bello el venezolano.
- (1986) Godos, insurgentes y visionarios.
- (1990) La creación del Nuevo Mundo.
- (1992) Golpe y Estado en Venezuela.
- (1994) Del cerro de plata al camino extraviado.

=== Short stories ===
- (1928) Barrabás y otros relatos.
- (1936) Red.
- (1949) Treinta hombres y sus sombras.
- (1954) Tiempo de contar. ( Anthology)
- (1966) Pasos y Pasajeros.
- (1967) La lluvia y otros cuentos.
- (1975) Camino de cuento. ( Anthology)
- (1980) Los Ganadores.

=== Poetry ===
- (1972) Manoa: 1932–1972.
- (1986) El hombre que voy siendo.

=== Theater ===
- (1958) El día de Antero Alban. La Tebaida. El Dios invisible. La fuga de Miranda.
- (1960) Chuo Gil y las tejedoras. Drama en un preludio y siete tiempos.

=== Travel ===
- (1950) La ciudad de nadie.
- (1954) El otoño en Europa.
- (1955) Un turista en el cercano oriente.
- (1960) La ciudad de nadie. El otoño en Europa. Un turista en el cercano oriente.
- (1971) La vuelta al mundo en diez trancos.
- (1975) El globo de colores.

== See also ==
- Los Notables
