= Las lanzas coloradas =

Novel by Arturo Uslar Pietri

- Author: Arturo Uslar Pietri
- Publication date: 1931
- Publication place: Venezuela

The Red Cans (Spanish: Las Lanzas Coloradas) is a 1931 Venezuelan novel by Arturo Uslar Pietri, written in Paris and published in Madrid. It is a narration of the Venezuelan War of Independence, fought during the regime of general caudillo José Tomás Boves from 1810 to 1823.
