= Ponta Verde =

Neighborhood in Brazil

Ponta Verde (Portuguese meaning 'green tip') is a beach in Maceió, capital city of Alagoas state in Brazil. A tip of land that rises out of the sea and is covered by green palm trees. This is the phenomenon that gave its name to one of the most frequented beaches in Maceió. In the past, it housed one of the most famous symbols of the city, "The Rhea Neck", a palm tree whose trunk resembled a rhea's neck. It was located near the present Yacht Club Alagoas (Clube Alagoinha). The reefs form natural pools and it is very common, during low tides, to see tourists bathing in these pools, especially near the lighthouse. There are some stands with live music bars, restaurants, snack bars, and hotels.

== Geography ==
Ponta Verde is localised in the South Zone.

=== Climate ===
Ponta Verde has a typical tropical climate, with warm to hot temperatures and high relative humidity all throughout the year. However, these conditions are relieved by a near absence of extreme temperatures and pleasant trade winds blowing from the ocean. January is the warmest month, with mean maximum of 31 °C and minimum of 22 °C; July experiences the coolest temperatures, with means of 26 °C and 15 °C. The absolute maximum and minimum are respectively 33 °C and 11.3 °C.

=== Vegetation ===
Ponta Verde has a tropical forest. Rain forests are characterized by high rainfall, with definitions setting minimum normal annual rainfall between 2,000 mm (about 78 inches or 2 meters) and 1700 mm (about 67 inches). The soil can be poor because high rainfall tends to leach out soluble nutrients. There are several common characteristics of tropical rainforest trees. Tropical rainforest species frequently possess one or more of the following attributes not commonly seen in trees of higher latitudes or trees in drier conditions on the same latitude.

== Demographics ==
According to the 2006 census, the racial makeup of Ponta Verde district inhabitants was 98% White people and 2% Black people. People of Latin Europe descent form the largest ethnic groups in the district. Predominantly Roman Catholics religion and Portuguese language.

== Economy ==
Ponta Verde is a vibrant tourist coastal area with hotels and pousadas (hostels), bars, nightclubs, pubs, restaurants, etc. Tourism is the most important segment in the district, because Ponta Verde district has beautifuls beaches with their calm and blue waters, their reefs and corals. Thanks to the barracas (traditional restaurants/bars built on the beach sand, just close by the sea waters and resembling huge Amazonian-Indian straw huts), thanks to the modern buildings facing the sea (luxurious hotels and residential buildings), thanks to the running and cycling tracks and row of benches that follow the coastline like at Copacabana beach in Rio or Miami beach in the US, thanks to the beach volley friendly practice and beach volley tournaments, and thanks to its beautiful squares and playgrounds, Ponta Verde is a place of entertainment, healthy activities, cultural activities, meeting, and nightlife.
