= Mariano Azuela =

Mexican author (1873–1952)

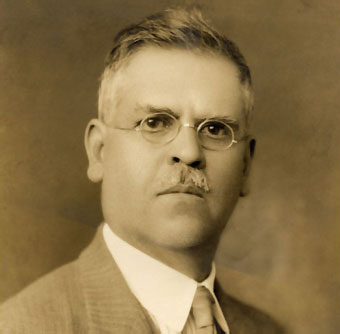
- Born: January 1, 1873; Lagos de Moreno, Jalisco, United Mexican States
- Died: 1 March 1952 (aged 79); Mexico City, Mexico
- Occupations: Writer, literary critic, medician, politician
- Writing career
- Genres: Novel, play, essay

Mariano Azuela González (January 1, 1873 – March 1, 1952) was a Mexican writer and medical doctor, best known for his fictional stories of the Mexican Revolution of 1910. He wrote novels, works for theatre and literary criticism. He is the first of the "novelists of the Revolution," and he influenced other Mexican novelists of social protest.

Among Azuela's first published writing were some short pieces for the magazine Gil Blas Cómico, where he wrote under the pen name of "Beleño", and his writing published under the heading Impresiones de un estudiante (Impressions of a Student) in 1896. His first novel, Maria Luisa, was written in 1907, followed by Los fracasados (The Failures) in 1908, and Mala yerba (Weeds) in 1909. The theme of his beginning novels are about fate. He wrote of the social life of Mexicans during the Díaz dictatorship. After experiencing the Mexican Revolution first-hand, his writing style became sarcastic and disillusioned. His first novel with the Revolution theme is Andrés Pérez, maderista in 1911, followed by Sin Amor (Without Love) in 1912, and his most popular, Los de abajo (The Underdogs) in 1915. He continued to write short works and novels influenced by the Revolution. It includes El camarada Pantoja (Comrade Pantoja) in 1937, Regina Landa in 1939, La nueva burguesía (The New Bourgeoisie) in 1941, and La maldición (The Curse, published posthumously) in 1955. These works mainly depicts the satirical picture of life in post revolutionary Mexico sharply and angrily stigmatizing demagoguery and political intrigue.

== Early life and career ==
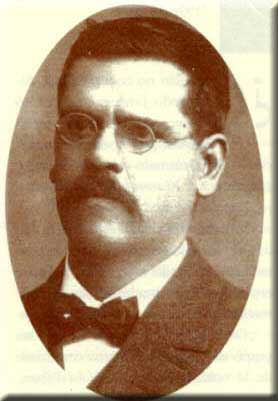
circa 1899

Azuela was born in Lagos de Moreno, Jalisco to a small, but successful rancher, Evaristo Azuela and Paulina Azuela, on January 1, 1873. He grew up in a small farm owned by his father, which later influences the settings in many of his fictional works. He was first admitted to a Catholic seminary at the age of fourteen, but soon abandoned his religious studies. He studied medicine in Guadalajara, Jalisco. He received his M.D. in 1899, practicing medicine first in his home town of Lagos de Moreno, and later, after the Mexican revolution, practiced in Mexico City. In 1900, he married Carmen Rivera, niece of Agustín Rivera, priest and historian of Lagos de Moreno. He went on to have five sons and five daughters.

Like most young students, Azuela was opposed to the dictatorship of the Porfirio Díaz regime. During his days in the Mexican Revolution, Azuela wrote about the war and its impact on Mexico. After Porfirio Díaz was overthrown in 1911, Azuela served as state Director of Education of Jalisco under President Francisco I. Madero. Following Madero's 1913 assassination, Azuela joined the Constitutionalist cause, which sought to restore the rule of law. He traveled with the military forces of Julián Medina, a follower of Pancho Villa, where he served as a field doctor. His participation in the conflict gave him ample material to write Los de abajo (The Underdogs) (1915). He later was forced for a time to emigrate to El Paso, Texas, when the counterrevolutionary forces of Victoriano Huerta were temporarily triumphant. It was there that he wrote Los de abajo, which was his first-hand description of combat during the Mexican revolution, based on his experiences in the field. It was first published as a serial in the newspaper "El Paso del Norte" from October 1915 to December 1915. The book did not receive general recognition until 1924, and it was hailed as a novel of the Revolution. Los de abajo (The Underdogs) depicts the futility of the Revolution, the opportunists in power, and the underprivileged majority of his country. He fought for a better Mexico, and he believed the Revolution corrected some injustices, but it has given rise to others equally deplorable.

== The Mexican Revolution's Effect on Mariano Azuela's Writing Career ==
In his encyclopedia entry "Azuela, Mariano (1873-1952)", Nicolás Kanellos underscores Azuela's physical involvement in the war, and its influence on Azuela's literary career. Kanellos begins by describing Azuela as, "one of Mexico's greatest novelists and chroniclers of the Mexican Revolution" (Kanellos, 105). In describing Azuela as a "chronicler", Kanellos immediately highlights one important feature of Azuela and his work, which is his tendency to record and portray history. In highlighting Azuela's relationship between history and literature, Kanellos establishes the inseparability of political and global contexts within Azuela's literary works; for example, Azuela's novel The Underdogs recounts the events of The Mexican Revolution from the perspective of the rebel soldiers. Therefore, Kanellos emphasizes the existing relationship between history and its involvement in Azuela's work. Kanellos then describes the reason as to why Azuela's literary works are deeply infused with Mexican politics and history stating, "Azuela's early career as a writer, in fact, was developed while participating in the Revolution first-hand as a physician in the army of Francisco 'Pancho' Villa" (Kanellos, 105). The terms "first-hand" and "participating" underscore Azuela's physical involvement in the war. Kanellos' use of the word "developed" then underscores the manner in which Azuela's physical involvement paved the way for his writing to grow and mature as a result of his experiences participating in the Mexican Revolution. Kanellos stresses in his encyclopedic entry the persisting role of history and its portrayal in Azuela's work, but he also emphasizes the manner in history, in particular the Mexican Revolution, essentially birthed Azuela's writing career.

== Cultural Identity in The Underdogs ==
In Margy McCrary's article, "The Aztec Connection: Exploring the Construction of Azuela's Revolutionaries in The Underdogs", she examines the description of Demetrio as a "full-blooded Aztec". She argues he gains authority over the land, and constructs a cultural identity where he and Mexican peasants must establish in order to resist the Spanish conquerors. McCrary contends that the purpose of a revolution is to reject the identity of the colonizer, but in order to do this "some sort of unified identity is necessary for a group to revolt successfully" (McCrary 31). The pre-colonial Aztec is embodied by Demetrio Macías because he is connected to both his ancestors and the land. Demetrio is depicted as "riding proudly on his horse" with "pure-blooded Aztec cheeks", however, Demetrio "seems devoid of any defined identity" because he never acknowledges a greater reasoning to his involvement in the revolution other than either revenge or satisfaction in being the revolutionaries' leader (Azuela 72). This illuminates that Azuela may care about the revolution more than the characters do. McCrary further explains that on page seventy-two of the novel, Macias and his "men threw out their chests as if to breathe the widening horizon" and the "immensity of the sky" illustrating how Demetrio's freedom is connected to the earth itself and that Demetrio is a legitimate inhabitant of the land. Furthermore, the sense of freedom that Demetrio and the Mexican men feel on the land serves to "distance them from their oppressed identities as colonized beings" because they immediately forget their bleak lives as conquered peasants (36). By depicting Demetrio as a pure-blooded Aztec, Azuela reveals that he as an author is “displeased with the current, colonized identity of his people" and wishes to reconstruct a strong Mexican identity before it had "been influenced by the Spanish colonizers" (37). As a result, Azuela emphasizes the consequences of colonization because Demetrio is "so far separated from his own heritage and identity that he does not even recognize it consciously" (39). When Demetrio begins to forget his identity it results in "petty fighting, looting, and anarchy" (34). Azuela emphasizes Demetrio's heritage so that readers understand what is at stake if cultural identity is lost.

== Later life ==
In 1917 he moved to Mexico City where, for the rest of his life, he continued his writing, and worked as a doctor among the poor.

In 1942 he received the Mexican National Prize for Literature. On April 8, 1943 he became a founding member of Mexico's National College, where he gave lectures on Mexican, French, and Spanish novelists, and on his own literary experiences. In 1949 he received the Mexican National Prize for Arts and Sciences. He died in Mexico City March 1, 1952 and was placed in a sepulchre of the Panteón Civil in the Rotonda de los Hombres Ilustres.

== Partial list of works ==
Novels

- María Luisa (1907).
- La rueda del aire (1908, The Air Wheel).
- Los fracasados (1908, The Losers).
- Los triunfadores (1909, The Winners).
- Mala yerba (1909, Bad Weed).
- Andrés Pérez, maderista (1911, Andrés Pérez, a Supporter of Madero).
- Sin Amor (1912, Without Love).
- Los de abajo (1915, The Underdogs) Partial Critical Edition.
- Los caciques (1917, The Bosses).
- Las moscas (1918, The Flies).
- Las tribulaciones de una familia decente (1918, The Tribulations of a Decent Family).
- El camarada Pantoja (1937, Comrade Pantoja)
- San Gabriel De Valdivias: Comunidad Indegena (1938, San Gabriel de Valdivias: Indigenous Community).
- Regina Landa (1939).
- Niño (1939, Child)
- Avanzada (1940, Advanced).
- La nueva burguesía (1941, The New Bourgeoisie).
- La marchanta (1944, The Merchantwoman).
- La mujer domada (1946, The Woman Shrew).
- Sendas perdidas (1949, Lost Roads).
- La maldición (1955, The Curse [posthumous]).
- Esa sangre (1956, That Blood [posthumous]).

Fictionalized Biographies

- Pedro Moreno (1935).
- Precursores (1935, Precursors).

Novelettes

- La malhora (1923, Evil Hour).
- El desquite (1925, The Revenge).
- La luciérnaga (1932, The Firefly).

Essay Collections

- Cien años de novela mexicana (1947, One Hundred Years of the Mexican Novel).

== Partial list of works translated into English ==
- The Underdogs (1929). New York: Brentano's.
- Marcela: A Mexican Love Story (1932). Anita Brenner, Trans. New York: Farrar & Rinehart, Incorporated. (A translation of Mala yerba)
- Two Novels of Mexico: The Flies. The Bosses (1956). Lesley Byrd Simpson, Trans. Berkeley: University of California Press.
- The Underdogs (1963). Enrique Munguía, Trans. New York: New American Library.
- Two Novels of the Mexican Revolution (1963). Frances Kellam Hendricks and Beatrice Berler, Trans. San Antonio, Texas: Principia Press of Trinity University. (The Trials of a Respectable Family, and The Underdogs.)
- Three Novels (1979). Frances Kellam Hendricks and Beatrice Berler, Trans. San Antonio, Texas: Trinity University Press. (The Trials of a Respectable Family, The Underdogs, and The Firefly.)

== See also ==
- Mexican Revolution
- Porfirio Diaz
- Francisco Madero
- The Underdogs
