= Frances Toor =

American author, publisher, anthropologist and ethnographer

Frances Toor (1890–1956) was an American author, publisher, anthropologist and ethnographer who wrote mainly about Mexico and Mexican indigenous cultures. She earned a B.A. and an M.A. in anthropology from University of California at Berkeley. She moved to Mexico City in 1922, influenced by her husband, dentist Joseph L. Weinberger, who also served as director of the B'nai B'rith office in Mexico City. In 1925, she founded the journal Mexican Folkways (published until 1937). She would eventually be referred to as "the gringa folklorista."
