= Angústia =

1936 novel by Graciliano Ramos

Anguish
- Author: Graciliano Ramos
- Original title: Angústia
- Language: Portuguese
- Subject: Anguish, loneliness, lack of meaning in life
- Genre: Fiction
- Set in: Maceió, Brazil
- Published: Greenwood Press
- Publisher: A. A. Knopf, José Olympio (original Brazilian edition)
- Publication date: 1936
- Publication place: Brazil
- English publication date: 1946
- Pages: 368 (original Brazilian edition)

Angústia is a book by Brazilian author Graciliano Ramos published in 1936. Tells the life of Luís da Silva, a man very stunned and confused with his own life. One day, he meets Marina, his new neighbour, a beautiful girl with whom he falls in love. From this point, the monotony of his life is abruptly changed for a voluntary thought about the family, the childhood and the present, when Julião Tavares, a rich man, fell in love with Marina.

The book is narrated in first person, where the protagonist is the narrator. He suffers from an existential angst — the main themes of the story; the reader is affected by it through the character, the character through the author.

== Style ==
Though the book is considered modernist, the author also makes use of Symbolism and Naturalism. His theories about romance are shown when he describes the angst of the main character, Luís da Silva: suffering, anxiety, a feeling of sickness. It's curious to say but there's an influence from the psychoanalysis, too, when the imagined disease of Luís da Silva begins to change his behavior and his sense of reality. Thus, Graciliano Ramos is one of the greatest authors of Brazilian modernism, transcending regional limits with his literary style, in comparison with Marcel Proust.
