= Latin American Boom =

Late 20th-century literary movement

The Latin American Boom (Spanish: Boom latinoamericano) was a literary movement of the 1960s and 1970s when the work of a group of relatively young Latin American novelists became widely circulated in Europe and throughout the world. The Boom is most closely associated with Julio Cortázar of Argentina, Carlos Fuentes of Mexico, Mario Vargas Llosa of Peru, and Gabriel García Márquez of Colombia. Influenced by European and North American Modernism, but also by the Latin American Vanguardia movement, these writers challenged the established conventions of Latin American literature. Their work is experimental and, owing to the political climate of the Latin America of the 1960s, also very political. "It is no exaggeration", critic Gerald Martin writes, "to state that if the Southern continent was known for two things above all others in the 1960s, these were, first and foremost, the Cuban Revolution (although Cuba is not in South America) and its impact both on Latin America and the Third World generally, and secondly, the Boom in Latin American fiction, whose rise and fall coincided with the rise and fall of liberal perceptions of Cuba between 1959 and 1971."

The sudden success of the Boom authors was in large part due to the fact that their works were among the first Latin American novels to be published in Europe, by publishing houses such as Barcelona's avant-garde Seix Barral. Indeed, Frederick M. Nunn writes that "Latin American novelists became world famous through their writing and their advocacy of political and social action, and because many of them had the good fortune to reach markets and audiences beyond Latin America through translation and travel—and sometimes through exile."

== History ==
=== Social influences ===
The 1960s and 1970s were decades of political turmoil all over Latin America, in a political and diplomatic climate strongly influenced by the dynamics of the Cold War. This climate formed the background for the work of the writers of the Latin American Boom, and defined the context in which their sometimes radical ideas had to operate. The Cuban Revolution in 1959 and the subsequent U.S. attempt to thwart it through the Bay of Pigs Invasion can be seen as the start of this period. Cuba's vulnerability led it to closer ties with the USSR, resulting in the Cuban Missile Crisis in 1962 when the US and USSR came dangerously close to nuclear war. Throughout the 1960s and 1970s military authoritarian regimes ruled in Argentina, Brazil, Chile, Paraguay, Peru and many others. For example, on September 11, 1973, the democratically elected President Salvador Allende was overthrown in Chile and replaced by General Augusto Pinochet, who went on to rule until the end of the 1980s. Chile under Pinochet became "infamous for [...] human rights abuses and torture techniques", and in Argentina the 1970s brought the Dirty War, notorious for its human rights violations and the disappearances of Argentine citizens. Many of these governments (which were supported by the US) cooperated with each other in terms of torturing or eliminating political opponents and "disposing of their bodies" in "the Operation Condor."

The period between 1950 and 1975 saw major changes in the way in which history and literature were approached in terms of interpretation and writing. It also produced a change in the self-perception of Spanish American novelists. The development of the cities, the coming of age of a large middle class, the Cuban Revolution, the Alliance for Progress, an increase in communication between the countries of Latin America, the greater importance of the mass media, and a greater attention to Latin America from Europe and the United States all contributed to this change. The most important political events of the period were the Cuban Revolution in 1959 and the Chilean coup d'état in 1973. The fall of Juan Perón in Argentina, the protracted violent struggle of the urban guerrillas, brutally repressed in Argentina and Uruguay, and the unending violence in Colombia also affected writers, as they generated explanations, or testimonies, or provided a troubling background for their work.

=== Origins ===
While most critics agree that the Boom started some time in the 1960s, there is some disagreement as to which work should be considered the first Boom novel. Some (such as Alfred McAdam) would start with Julio Cortázar's Hopscotch (Rayuela in Spanish) from 1963 while others prefer Vargas Llosa's The Time of the Hero (La ciudad y los perros in Spanish) which won the Biblioteca Breve Award in 1962. Fernando Alegria considers Augusto Roa Bastos' Hijo de hombre the inaugural work of the Boom even though, as Shaw notes, it was published in 1959. One could, however, even go as far back as Miguel Ángel Asturias's 1949 novel Men of Maize.

Another variation is articulated by Randolph D. Pope: "The story of the Boom could start chronologically with Miguel Ángel Asturias's El Señor Presidente (published in 1946, but started in 1922). Other starting points could be Ernesto Sabato's The Tunnel (1948) or Onetti's El pozo (1939), or even the vanguardist movements of the 1920s. However, the writers of the Boom declared themselves to be an "orphan" literary generation ––without a Latin American parent influence, an autochthonous model caught between (a) their admiration for Proust, Joyce, Mann, Sartre and other European writers and their owing much of their stylistic innovation to the Vanguardists and (b) their need to have a Spanish American voice, even if they rejected the most respected Spanish American writers Indigenistas, Criollistas, and Mundonovistas." Jean Franco writes that the Boom marks "a refusal to be identified with the rural or with anachronistic narratives such as the novela de la tierra."

=== Conclusion ===
The greater attention paid to Latin American novelists and their international success in the 1960s, a phenomenon that was called the Boom, affected all writers and readers in that period. What mainly brought writers together and focused the attention of the world on Latin America was the success of the Cuban Revolution in 1959, which promised a new age. The period of euphoria can be considered closed when in 1971 the Cuban government hardened its party line and the poet Heberto Padilla was forced to reject in a public document his so-called decadent and deviant views. The furor over Padilla's case brought to an end the affinity between Spanish American intellectuals and the Cuban inspirational myth. The Padilla affair is thought by some to have signalled the beginning of the end of the Boom. However, in a significant sense, the Boom has not ended; the writers associated with the Boom have continued to publish books that have been read by audiences far larger than those enjoyed by Latin American writers prior to the Boom. The books of such writers as Carlos Fuentes and Mario Vargas Llosa are widely distributed and translated into other major European and Asian languages to a much greater extent than those of such significant pre-Boom writers as Arturo Uslar Pietri, José María Arguedas, Eduardo Mallea or Manuel Rojas.

== Literary influences ==
The rise of Latin American literature began with the writings of José Martí, Rubén Darío and José Asunción Silva's modernist departures from the European literary canon. European modernist writers like James Joyce have also influenced the writers of the Boom, as have the Latin American writers of the Vanguardia movement. Elizabeth Coonrod Martinez argues that the writers of the Vanguardia were the "true precursors" to the Boom, writing innovative and challenging novels before Borges and others conventionally thought to be the main Latin American inspirations for the mid-20th century movement. In 1950, Spanish American novelists were tolerated but marginal in the literary landscape, with Paris and New York representing the center of the literary world; by 1975 they were celebrated as central figures. As well as being a publishing phenomenon, the Boom introduced a series of novel aesthetic and stylistic features to world literature. In general—and considering there are many countries and hundreds of important authors—at the start of the period, Realism prevails, with novels tinged by an existentialist pessimism, with well-rounded characters lamenting their destinies, and a straightforward narrative line. In the 1960s, language loosens up, gets hip, pop, streetwise, characters are much more complex, and the chronology becomes intricate, making of the reader an active participant in the deciphering of the text. Late in the period the political adventure goes sour, while the linguistic sophistication reaches a new height, and novelists turn more to a reflection on their own writing, a fiction on fiction or metafiction, while characters and story lines show the corrosive power of a postmodern society, where all is equally available and insignificant.

With the success of the Boom, the work of a previous generation of writers gained access to a new and expanded public. These precursors include Jorge Luis Borges, Miguel Ángel Asturias, Arturo Uslar Pietri and Alejo Carpentier, Juan Carlos Onetti, and Juan Rulfo.

== Hallmarks ==
The Boom novels are essentially modernist novels. They treat time as nonlinear, often use more than one perspective or narrative voice and feature a great number of neologisms (the coining of new words or phrases), puns and even profanities. As Pope writes, in reference to the style of the Boom: "It relied on a Cubist superposition of different points of view, it made time and lineal progress questionable, and it was technically complex. Linguistically self assured, it used the vernacular without apologies." Other notable characteristics of the Boom include the treatment of both "rural and urban settings", internationalism, an emphasis on both the historical and the political, as well as "questioning of regional as well as, or more than, national identity; awareness of hemisphereic as well as worldwide economic and ideological issues; polemicism; and timeliness." Boom literature breaks down the barriers between the fantastical and the mundane, transforming this mixture into a new reality. Of the Boom writers, Gabriel García Márquez is most closely associated with the use of magical realism; indeed, he is credited with bringing it "into vogue" after the publishing of One Hundred Years of Solitude in 1967.

=== Magical realism ===
In The Ends of Literature, Brett Levinson writes that magical realism, "a key aesthetic mode within recent Latin American fiction ... materializes when Latin American history reveals itself as incapable of accounting for its own origin, an incapacity which traditionally ... represents a demand for a myth: mythos as a means to explain the beginnings which escape history's narrative." The writings of the Chroniclers of the Indies depicted the exotic "new world" and their accounts of conquering strange new lands became accepted as history. These often fantastical stories helped to bring about a new aesthetic, which morphed into magical realism and "(as conceived by Alejo Carpentier) marvelous realism or lo real maravilloso. According to this aesthetic, unreal things are treated as if realistic and mundane, and mundane things as if unreal. Plots, while often based on real experiences, incorporate strange, fantastic, and legendary elements, mythical peoples, speculative settings, and characters who, while plausible, could also be unreal, and combine the true, the imaginary, and the nonexistent in such a way that they are difficult to separate."

=== Historical fiction ===
An interest in history is another characteristic of the novels of the Boom period. The epitome of this is the dictator novel where historical figures and events were portrayed in a way that connections between them and contemporary events in Latin America could not be doubted. An example is Roa Bastos's I, the Supreme, which depicts the 19th-century Paraguayan dictatorship of José Gaspar Rodríguez de Francia but was published at the height of Alfredo Stroessner's regime. Nunn writes that "novelists of the Boom themselves evinced a sophisticated grasp of their genre's ability to depict parallel and alternative history. And they actively participated in the cultural and political debates of the region that questioned the very meaning and worth of history."

== Major representatives ==
Who is and who is not to be included in the Boom has been widely debated and never settled. On the other hand, a few writers exerted wide and undisputed influence. While the names of many other writers may be added to the list, the following may not be omitted:

=== Julio Cortázar ===
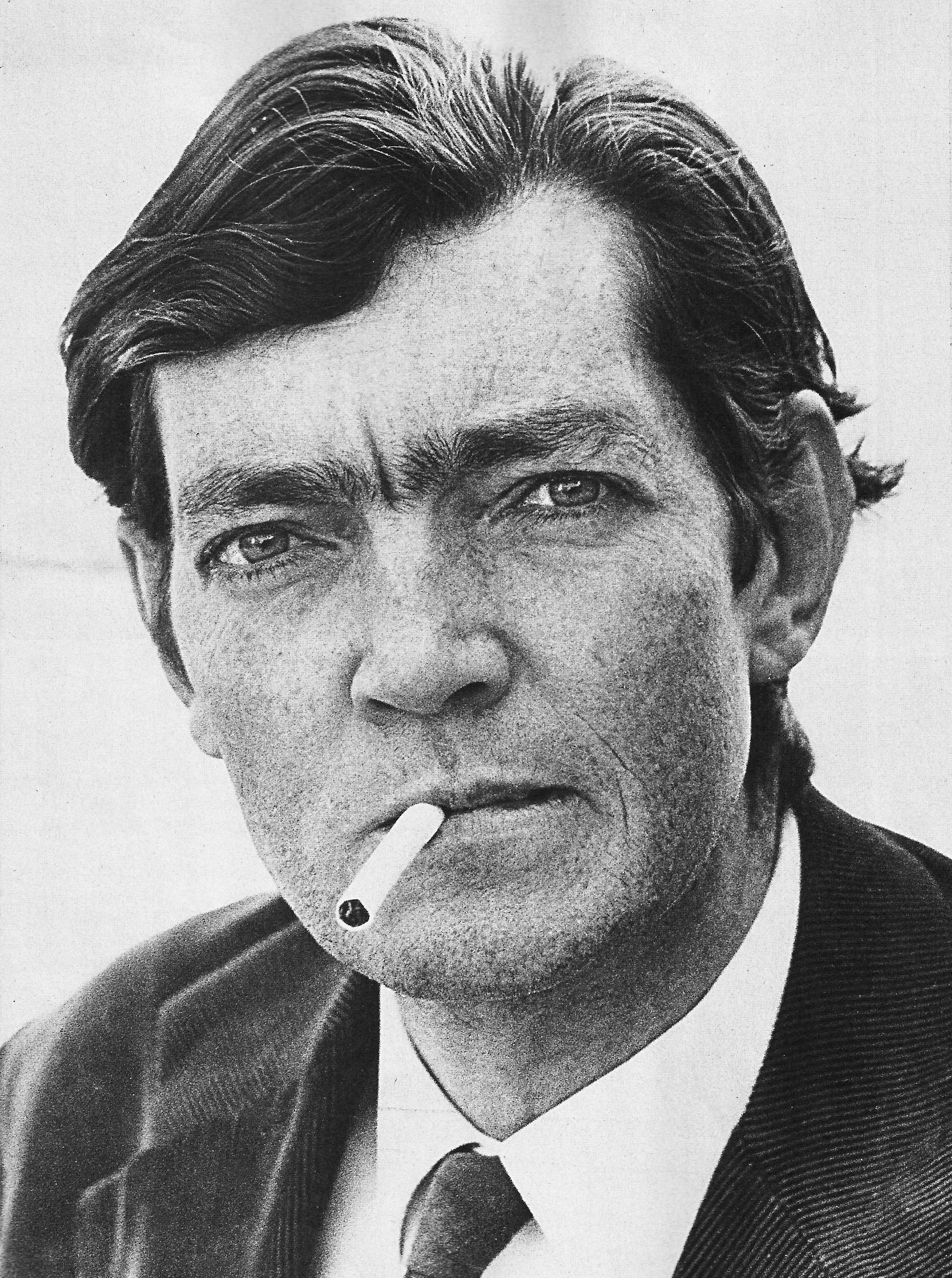
Julio Cortázar

Julio Cortázar was born in Belgium on August 26, 1914, to Argentinian parents with whom he lived in Switzerland until moving to Buenos Aires at the age of four. Like other Boom writers, Cortázar grew to question the politics in his country: his public opposition to Juan Perón caused him to leave his professorial position at the university of Mendoza and, ultimately, led to his exile. He moved to France, where he spent most of his professional life and, in 1981, he became a French citizen. Like García Márquez, Cortázar publicly supported the Cuban government of Fidel Castro, as well as leftist Chilean President Salvador Allende and other left-wing movements like the Sandinistas in Nicaragua. In his fiction, however, political elements were generally muted or absent until the publication of the explicitly political novel Libro de Manuel in 1973.

Cortázar was influenced by Borges, as well as by Edgar Allan Poe. He was perhaps the most radically experimental of all the Boom authors. His most important work, and the one that propelled him to international recognition, is the highly experimental novel Hopscotch (1963). This consists of 155 chapters, 99 of which are "expendable", which can be read in multiple orders according to the reader's predilection.

His other works include the short story collections Bestiario (1951), Final del juego (1956), Las armas secretas (1959), Todos los fuegos el fuego (1966). He also wrote novels such as Los premios (1960) and Around the Day in Eighty Worlds (1967), and the unclassifiable Historias de cronopios y de famas (1962). Cortázar died in Paris on February 12, 1984.

=== Carlos Fuentes ===
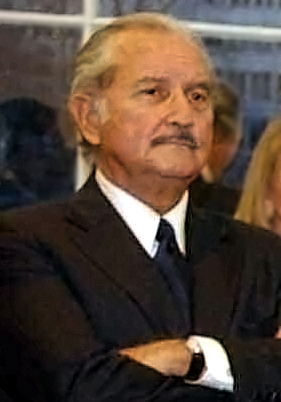
Carlos Fuentes

Carlos Fuentes was born on November 11, 1928, and began to publish in the 1950s. He was the son of a Mexican diplomat, and lived in cities such as Buenos Aires, Quito, Montevideo and Rio de Janeiro as well as Washington, D. C. His experiences with anti-Mexican discrimination in the United States led him to examine Mexican culture more closely. His 1962 novel The Death of Artemio Cruz (La muerte de Artemio Cruz in Spanish), which employs innovative changes in narrative point-of-view, describes the life of a former Mexican revolutionary on his deathbed. Other important works include Where the Air Is Clear (1959), Aura (1962), Terra Nostra (1975), and the post-Boom novella The Old Gringo (1985).

Fuentes not only wrote some of the most important novels of the period, but was also a critic and publicist of Spanish America. In 1955 Fuentes and Emmanuel Carballo founded the journal Revista Mexicana de Literatura which introduced Latin Americans to the works of European Modernists and the ideas of Jean-Paul Sartre and Albert Camus. In 1969 he published the important critical work, La nueva novela hispanoamericana. Fuentes held the position of professor of Latin American literature at Columbia University (1978) and at Harvard (1987) and more recently was associated with Brown University. He once said that "the so-called Boom, in reality, is the result of four centuries that, literarily, reached a moment of urgency in which fiction became the way to organize lessons from the past." Fuentes died on May 15, 2012.

=== Gabriel García Márquez ===
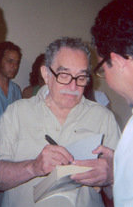
Gabriel García Márquez

Gabriel García Márquez started out as a journalist and wrote many acclaimed non-fiction and short stories; his earliest published writings were short stories which appeared in Bogotá's El Espectador newspaper in the 1940s.

He is best known for novels such as One Hundred Years of Solitude (1967) and The Autumn of the Patriarch (1975), No One Writes to the Colonel (1962), and post-Boom work such as Love in the Time of Cholera (1985). He has achieved significant critical acclaim and widespread commercial success, most notably for introducing what has been labeled magical realism to the literary world. He experimented with more or less traditional approaches to reality, so that "the most frightful, the most unusual things are told with the deadpan expression". A commonly cited example is the physical and spiritual ascending into heaven of a character while she is hanging the laundry out to dry in One Hundred Years of Solitude. García Márquez is now considered one of the most significant authors of the 20th century, as is attested by his winning the 1982 Nobel Prize in Literature. García Márquez died on April 17, 2014.

=== Mario Vargas Llosa ===
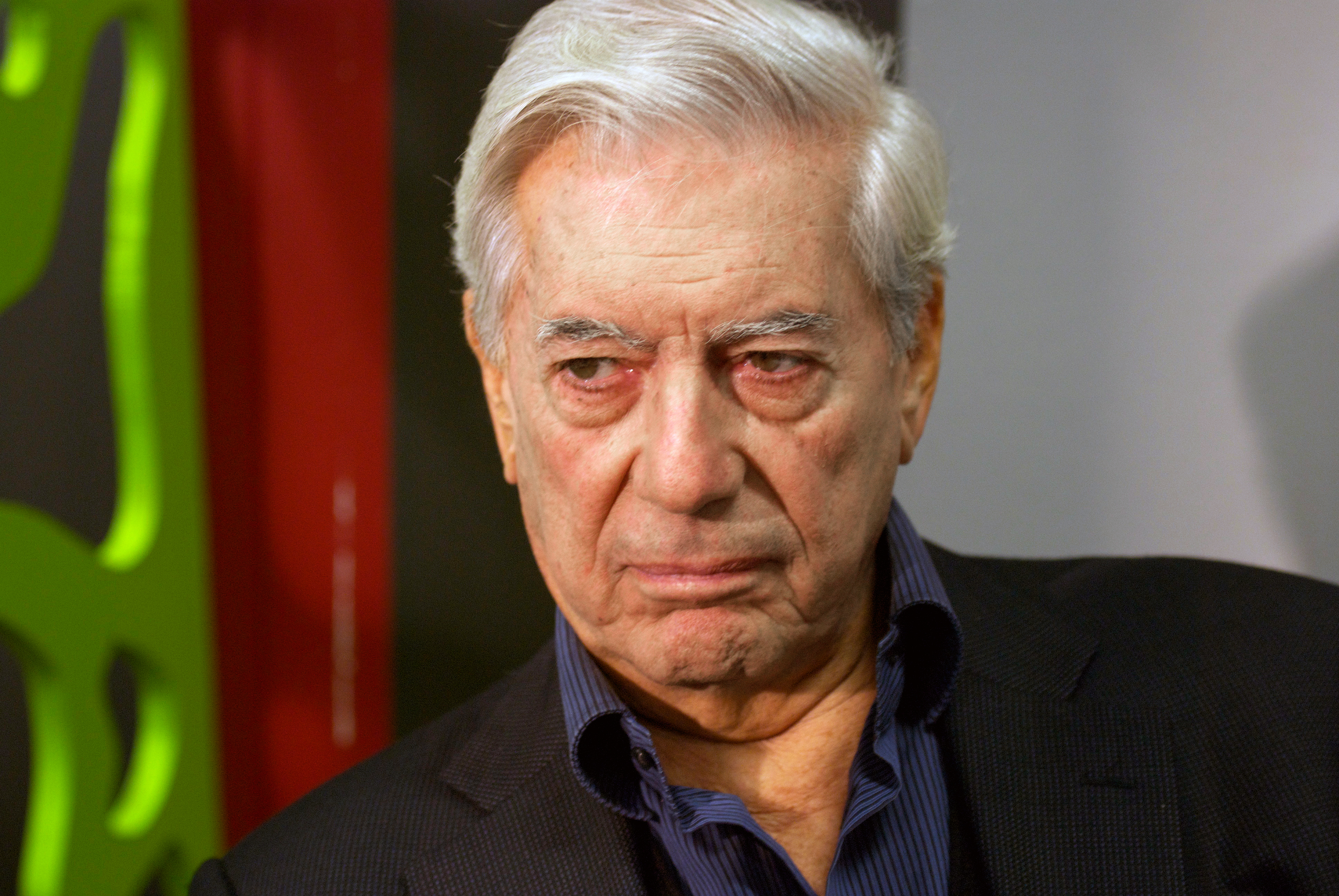
Mario Vargas Llosa

Mario Vargas Llosa was a Peruvian novelist, short story writer, playwright, journalist and literary and political critic. He attended Lima's University of San Marcos and subsequently attained a doctorate in Latin American literature in Spain. He shot to fame with his novel The Time of the Hero (1963), a scathing indictment of cruelty and corruption in a Peruvian military academy (and, by implication, in Peruvian society), based on the author's own experiences at Lima's Leoncio Prado Military Academy.

Vargas Llosa also wrote The Green House (1966), the epic Conversation in The Cathedral (1969), Captain Pantoja and the Special Service (1973), post-Boom novels such as Aunt Julia and the Scriptwriter (1977) and The War of the End of the World (1981), his first attempt at a historical novel. He also wrote a thesis on Gabriel García Márquez (1971). Vargas Llosa returned to Lima in 2000, following the resignation of President Fujimori who won the 1990 Peruvian election, beating Vargas Llosa. The Swedish Academy awarded him the 2010 Nobel Prize in Literature. Vargas Llosa died on April 13, 2025.

== Other figures ==
Several other writers have been associated with the Boom. Juan Rulfo, the author of two books, only one of them a novel, was the acknowledged master incorporated a posteriori; a writer who balances social concern, verbal experimentation and unique style. Augusto Roa Bastos of Paraguay wrote Hijo de hombre, considered by some to be the first novel of the Boom. His highly experimental I, the Supreme has been compared to Joyce's Ulysses and is "one of the most highly regarded works of fictional history to ever come out of South America." Manuel Puig, an Argentine and the Venezuelan Adriano González León, are central figures, along with Vargas Llosa, of the Seix-Barral publishing world. The Cuban novelist José Lezama Lima, though not widely known in the English-language publishing world, can also be regarded as a major figure on the basis of his major novel, Paradiso (1966). José Donoso is a Chilean writer of both the Boom and the post-Boom. In his book, Historia Personal del "Boom", Donoso also mentions other writers associated with the movement. Examples are Jorge Amado (although he began writing novels back in the 1930s) of Brazil, Salvador Garmendia of Venezuela, Gastón Suárez and Marcelo Quiroga Santa Cruz of Bolivia and David Viñas of Argentina, among many others.

== Publishing Latin American Boom novelists ==
Publishing played a crucial role in the advent of the Boom. Major publishing houses based in Havana, Mexico City, Buenos Aires, Montevideo, Asunción or Santiago were responsible for publishing most of the Boom novels, and these cities became strong centers of cultural innovation.

- Santiago in Chile is presided over by the criticism of Alone, while the older generation of Benjamín Subercaseaux, Eduardo Barrios, Marta Brunet, and Manuel Rojas were quietly superseded by José Donoso. Other writers, such as Enrique Lafourcade, have a large national readership.
- Cuba is a lively cultural center, first with the group of Orígenes, and then with Lunes de Revolución.
- In Colombia the rural novels of Eduardo Caballero Calderón were displaced by García Márquez who was followed by Alvarez Gardeazábal.
- Mexico continues a tradition of strong regional writers and diverse schools of writing, from Yáñez to Sainz, with novelists such as Luis Spota or Sergio Fernández, the first a popular, the other a refined, writer, both better known in Mexico than abroad.

This period saw the publishing of Boom novels in Barcelona, reflecting the new interest of Spanish publishing houses in the Spanish American market. However, as Alejandro Herrero-Olaizola notes, the revenue generated by the publishing of these novels gave a boost to the Spanish economy, even as the works were subjected to Franco's censors. Some of the Seix Barral-published novels include Mario Vargas Llosa's The Time of the Hero (1963) and his Captain Pantoja and the Special Service (1973), and Manuel Puig's Betrayed by Rita Hayworth (1971). A crucial figure "in the promotion of Latin American literature in Spain" (and elsewhere) was the "super-agent" Carmen Balcells, whom Vargas Llosa referred to as "The Big Mama of the Latin American novel."

== Critique ==
A common criticism of the Boom is that it is too experimental and has a "tendency toward elitism". In his study of the Post-Boom period, Donald L. Shaw writes that Mario Benedetti was very critical of Boom writers like García Márquez who, in Benedetti's view, "represent a privileged class that had access to universal culture and were thus utterly unrepresentative of average people in Latin America." In his article on Donoso's break from the Boom Philip Swanson articulates another critique of the "new novel" (i.e. Boom novel): "Though [it] was essentially a reaction against a perceived staleness in conventional realism, many of the formal experiments and innovations of modern fiction have themselves become standardized features of modern writing, leading to another form of traditionalism where one set of stereotypes has been replaced with another." Also often criticized is the Boom's emphasis on masculinity, both in the fact that all of the movement's representatives were male and the treatment of female characters within the novels. The Boom fiction's emphasis on history and the fantastic has also been the subject of criticism as it was claimed that it is too removed from the realities of Latin American political situations that it criticized. Authors such as Severo Sarduy, who was associated with the French intellectuals of Tel Quel, have critiqued the tropes (e.g., phallogocentric discourse) that supported much of the literary movement's legitimacy.

== Impact ==
The Boom had an immediate impact as it changed the way Latin American culture was viewed around the world. The commercial success of the Boom writers had the effect of elevating them almost to rock star status in Latin America. Translation played a role in the success of Boom writers: it gave them a much larger audience. These authors continued to produce best sellers for four decades. In addition, the Boom opened the door for new Latin American writers in terms of the international scene. A testimony to the Boom's global impact is the fact that "up-and-coming international writers" look upon the likes of Fuentes, García Márquez or Vargas Llosa as their mentors.

=== After the Boom ===
Since the 1980s it has become common to speak of Post-Boom writers, most of whom were born during the 1940s, 1950s and 1960s, such as Roberto Bolaño (By Night in Chile, 2000; The Savage Detectives, 1998), the post-Boom Spanish-language writer who has arguably made the greatest impact on world literature. It is difficult to clearly situate the Post-Boom as many of its writers were active before the end of the Boom. Indeed, some writers, like José Donoso could be said to belong to both movements. His novel The Obscene Bird of Night (El obsceno pájaro de la noche, 1970) is considered, as Philip Swanson notes, "one of the classics of the Boom." His later work, however, fits more comfortably into the post-Boom. Manuel Puig and Severo Sarduy are considered writers whose works embody the transition from the Boom to the Post-Boom. This uneasiness in categorization is perpetuated by the fact that major writers of the Boom (Fuentes, García Márquez and Vargas Llosa) continued writing well after the end of the Boom. The post-Boom is distinct from the Boom in various respects, most notably in the presence of female authors such as Isabel Allende (The House of the Spirits, 1982), Luisa Valenzuela (The Lizard's Tales, 1983), Giannina Braschi (Empire of Dreams, 1988; Yo-Yo Boing!, 1998), Cristina Peri Rossi (Ship of Fools, 1984) and Elena Poniatowska (Tinisima, 1991). While Valenzuela and Poniatowska were both active writers during, and in Poniatowska's case even before (Lilus Kikus, 1954), the Boom period, Some critics consider Allende "a product of the Boom." Shaw identifies Antonio Skármeta (Ardiente paciencia, 1985), Rosario Ferré ("La muñeca menor", 1976; The House on the Lagoon, 1999) and Gustavo Sainz (The Princess of the Iron Palace, 1974; A troche y moche, 2002) as Post-Boom writers. Some Post-Boom writers challenge the perceived elitism of the Boom by using a simpler, more readable style and going back to realism. Others, like Allende, are magic realist.

== See also ==
- McOndo

== Sources ==
- Aguilar, Mario I. (2004), "Charles Horman versus Henry Kissinger: US Intervention in 1970s Chile and the Case for Prosecutions", in Jones, Adam (ed.), Genocide, War Crimes and the West: History and Complicity, London: Zed Books, pp. 186–200, ISBN 978-1-84277-191-4.
- Coonrod Martinez, Elizabeth (2001), Before the Boom: Latin American Revolutionary Novels of the 1920s, New York: University Press of America, ISBN 978-0-7618-1948-6.
- Donoso, José (1972), Historia Personal del "Boom", Barcelona: Editorial Anagrama, ISBN 978-956-239-047-7.
- Franco, Jean (2006), "Globalisation and Literary History", Bulletin of Latin American Research, 25 (4): 441–452, doi:10.1111/j.1470-9856.2006.00206.x.
- González Echevarría, Roberto; Pupo-Walker, Enrique, eds. (1996), The Cambridge History of Latin American Literature, vol. 2: The Twentieth Century, Cambridge: Cambridge University Press, ISBN 978-0-521-41035-9.
- Herrero-Olaizola, Alejandro (2007), The Censorship Files: Latin American Writers and Franco's Spain, Albany: SUNY Press, ISBN 978-0-7914-6985-9.
- Kristal, Efraín (1998), Temptation of the Word: The Novels of Mario Vargas Llosa, Nashville, TN: Vanderbilt University Press, ISBN 978-0-8265-1301-4.
- Levinson, Brett (2001), The Ends of Literature: The Latin American "Boom" in the Neoliberal Marketplace, Stanford: Stanford University Press, ISBN 978-0-8047-4346-4, archived from the original on September 27, 2007.
- Martin, Gerald (1984), "Boom, Yes; 'New' Novel, No: Further Reflections on the Optical Illusions of the 1960s in Latin America", Bulletin of Latin American Research, 3 (2), Blackwell Publishing: 53–63, doi:10.2307/3338252, JSTOR 3338252.
- McMurray, George R. (1987), Critical Essays on Gabriel García Márquez, Boston: G.K. Hall & Co., ISBN 978-0-8161-8834-5.
- Nunn, Frederick M. (2001), Collisions With History: Latin American Fiction and Social Science from El Boom to the New World Order, Athens, Ohio: Ohio University Press, ISBN 978-0-89680-219-3.
- Ocasio, Rafael (2004), Literature of Latin America, Westport, Connecticut: Greenwood Press, ISBN 978-0-313-32001-9.
- Pilger, John (2003), The New Rulers of the World, London: Verso, ISBN 978-1-85984-412-0.
- Pope, Randolph D. (1996), "The Spanish American novel from 1950 to 1975", in González Echevarría, Roberto (ed.), The Cambridge History of Latin American Literature, Volume 2: The Twentieth Century, Cambridge: Cambridge University Press, pp. 226–279, ISBN 978-0-521-41035-9.
- Sens, Allen; Stoett, Peter (2002), Global Politics: Origins, Currents, Directions (2nd ed.), Scarborough, ON: Nelson Thomson Learning, ISBN 978-0-17-616910-7
- Shaw, Donald L. (1998), The Post-Boom in Spanish American Fiction, Albany: SUNY Press, ISBN 978-0-7914-3826-8.
- Shaw, Donald L. (April 1994), "Which Was the First Novel of the Boom?", The Modern Language Review, 89 (2), Modern Humanities Research Association: 360–371, doi:10.2307/3735239, JSTOR 3735239.
- Swanson, Philip (Winter 1987), "Donoso and the Post-Boom: Simplicity and Subversion", Contemporary Literature, 28 (4), University of Wisconsin Press: 520–529, doi:10.2307/1208315, JSTOR 1208315.
- Williams, Raymond L. (2002), "Fuentes the Modern; Fuentes the Postmodern", Hispania, 85 (2), American Association of Teachers of Spanish and Portuguese: 209–218, doi:10.2307/4141048, JSTOR 4141048
