= Octaedro =

1974 short story collection by Julio Cortázar

- first edition
- Author: Julio Cortázar
- Language: Spanish
- Publisher: Sudamericana
- Publication date: 1974
- Publication place: Argentina
- Pages: 165
- ISBN: 978-950-511-183-1
- OCLC: 40249282

Octaedro (Octahedron) is a 1974 short story collection by Julio Cortázar. Its name comes from the octahedron, a 3D geometric solid with eight identical faces, reflecting the eight stories that comprise it. It builds on the social and political themes of his earlier Libro de Manuel (1973), relating them to other more universal themes.

All the stories were translated in English by Gregory Rabassa and published as part of the collection A Change of Light and Other Stories in 1980.

== Contents ==
- Liliana llorando ("Liliana Weeping")
- Los pasos en las huellas ("Footsteps in the Footprints")
- Manuscrito hallado en un bolsillo ("Manuscript Found in a Pocket")
- Verano ("Summer")
- Ahí pero dónde, cómo ("There but Where, How")
- Lugar llamado Kindberg ("A Place Named Kindberg")
- Las fases de Severo ("Severo's Phases")
- Cuello de gatito negro ("Throat of a Black Kitten")

== Timeline ==
Octaedro was published while Julio Cortázar was taking part in the Russell Court II in Rome (1974–1976) to examine the political situation and the violations of human rights in Latin America.
