= Zofia Chądzyńska =

Polish writer and translator

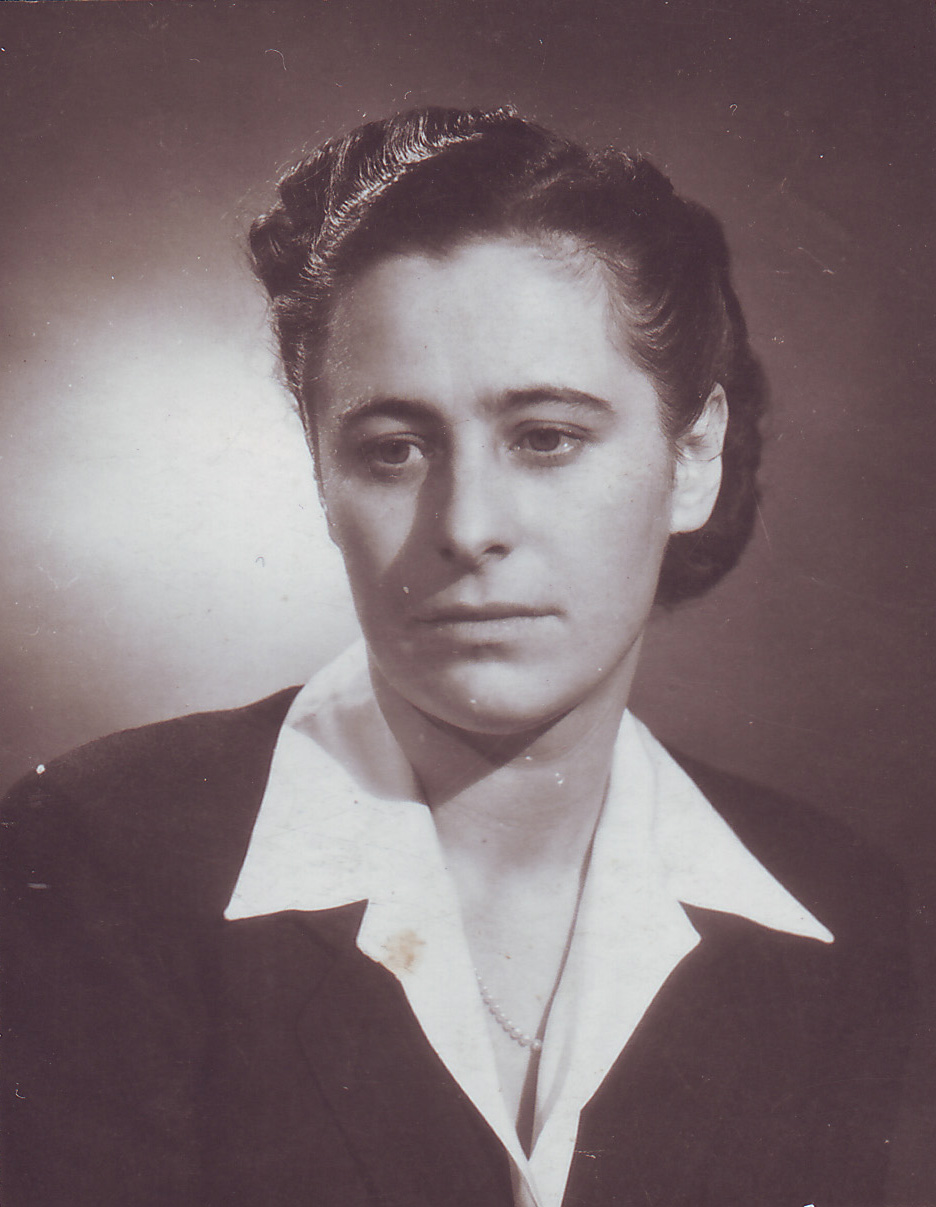
- Chądzyńska around 1950
- Born: Zofia Szymanowska; 24 February 1912; Warsaw, Congress Poland
- Died: 23 September 2003 (aged 91); Warsaw, Poland
- Resting place: Warsaw, Poland
- Citizenship: Polish, Argentine, British
- Education: Akademia Nauk Politycznych in Warsaw
- Occupation: Novelist
- Spouse(s): 1.Bohdan Chądzynski, 2. Stanisław Gajewski
- Writing career
- Pen name: Sophie Bohdan
- Language: Polish, French, Spanish

Zofia Chądzyńska or Sophie Bohdan (24 February 1912 – 23 September 2003), was a Polish writer and translator of the Iberoamerican literature. Her first book was published in French under a pseudonym of Sophie Bohdan, entitled "Comme l'ombre qui passe", Publisher: Paris : Calmann-Lévy (impr. Chantenay), 1960. Later she was publishing in Polish under her original name Zofia Chądzyńska.

She was one of the most famous Polish translators in the 1970s and she changed the literary landscape in Poland by introducing the Iberoamerican literature.

== Biography ==
=== Polish and French years ===
She graduated from the Faculty of Economics of the Academy of Political Science in Warsaw. From 1930 to 1939 she was a clerk in the Ministry of Religious Affairs and Public Education. During World War II she was a prisoner of the Gestapo at Pawiak (1940). After the war she lived in France where her husband, Bohdan Chądzyński, was a Polish consul in Lyon until 1949, then was exiled via Morocco to Argentina.

=== Exile in Argentina ===
From 1949 until 1959 she lived in Buenos Aires, where she ran a white linen laundry and befriended Witold Gombrowicz, who later became one of the most famous Polish writers. She helped him in daily life and also with translating his works into Spanish. She also introduced him to her friends, the Buenos Aires political and cultural elite. Under the influence of Jean Reverzy, whom she knew from Lyon, she started writing her own book. Many years later she translated his two books into Polish. Her beloved husband Bohdan died early in 1951 and her father (who was a friend of Arthur Rubinstein) died two weeks after him, but in Poland).

=== Years in Poland ===
When her first books were published almost simultaneously, one in French in Paris and the other one in Polish in Warsaw, she moved back to Poland in 1960, and she lived in Warsaw. During her travel from Argentina to Poland she read a book Hopscotch by Julio Cortázar, which she got from her friends. This inspired her to translate it into Polish. This was a great success, and Cortázar (later her good friend) was more popular in Poland than in any other country. Later she was publishing her own books and translated almost a hundred Iberoamerican books into Polish.

== Novels ==
=== as Sophie Bohdan published in French ===
- Comme l'ombre qui passe : roman Publisher: Paris : Calmann-Lévy (impr. Chantenay), 1960

=== as Zofia Chądzyńska published in Polish ===
- Ślepi bez lasek (Czytelnik 1959, 1970); New edition as: Śpiew muszli (Akapit Press, 1995, 2003)
- Chemia (Czytelnik 1962)
- Ryby na piasku (Czytelnik 1965)
- Skrzydło sowy (PIW 1967)
- Przez Ciebie, Drabie (Nasza Księgarnia 1969, 1972, 1974, 1979, 1984)
- Życie za życie (Nasza Księgarnia 1971, 1973; Wydawnictwo Lubelskie 1979 in series of Biblioteka młodych); New edition as: Rekma, czyli Życie za życie (Akapit Press, 1995)
- Statki, które mijają się nocą (Nasza Księgarnia 1975, 1989, Hamal Books 1994, Akapit Press 2002)
- Wakacje z Zygą (Młodzieżowa Agencja Wydawnicza 1977)
- Wstęga pawilonu (Nasza Księgarnia 1978, 1982, Akapit Press 1996, Siedmioróg 2000; on an honorary list of Lista Honorowa IBBY)
- Dorosnąć (Nasza Księgarnia 1987, Hamal Books 1994, Siedmioróg 2000, Akapit Press 2002)
- Co mi zostało z tych lat (Akapit Press 1996); New edition as: Nie wszystko o moim życiu (Akapit Press 2003) - autobiography

=== Translations (selection) ===
- Jorge Luis Borges, Alef - original title: El Aleph, 1949, essays and short stories. A slightly expanded edition was published in 1957. English title: The Aleph and Other Stories 1933-1969 (ISBN 0-525-05154-6).
- Jorge Luis Borges, Księga piasku - original title:El libro de arena, 1975, short stories, English title: The Book of Sand, 1977.
- Jorge Luis Borges, Opowiadania (Wydawnictwo Literackie 1978)
- Jorge Luis Borges, Raport Brodiego - original title: El informe de Brodie, short stories, 1970. English title: Dr. Brodie's Report, 1971.
- Jorge Luis Borges, Twórca (with Krystyna Rodowska)
- Jorge Luis Borges with Margarity Guerrero, Zoologia fantastyczna (Warszawa 1983)- original title: Manual de zoología fantástica, 1957, short pieces about imaginary beings, written with Margarita Guerrero.
- Julio Cortázar, Egzamin (1991) - original title: El examen (1950, first published in 1985)
- Julio Cortázar, Gra w klasy (wyd. I: 1968, Spółdzielnia Wydawnicza Czytelnik - original title:Rayuela (Hopscotch) (1963)
- Julio Cortázar, Książka dla Manuela (Wydawnictwo Literackie 1980) - original title: Libro de Manuel (1973)
- Julio Cortázar, Niewpory (Wydawnictwo Literackie, 1989)
- Julio Cortázar, Nikt, byle kto... (Wydawnictwo Literackie 1981)
- Julio Cortázar, Opowiadania
- Julio Cortázar, Opowieści o kronopiach i famach
- Julio Cortázar, Ostatnia runda
- Julio Cortázar, Ośmiościan (Wydawnictwo Literackie 1977)
- Julio Cortázar, Proza z obserwatorium (Wydawnictwo Literackie 1986)
- Julio Cortázar, Tango raz jeszcze (Wydawnictwo Literackie 1983)
- Julio Cortázar, W osiemdziesiąt światów dookoła dnia (CZytelnik 1976)
- Julio Cortázar, Wielkie wygrane
- Julio Cortázar, Tajemna bron Original Title: Las Armas secretas, 1967.
- Jose Donoso, Plugawy ptak nocy (Czytelnik 1975)
- Griselda Gambaro, Bóg nie lubi szczęśliwych (Wydawniztwo Literackie 1984)
- Gabriel Garcia Marquez, Bardzo stary pan z olbrzymimi skrzydłami (Muza 2001; with Carlos Marrodan Casas)
- Rita Gombrowicz, Gombrowicz w Argentynie. Świadectwa i dokumenty 1939-1963 (with Anna Husarska)
- Tom Kempiński, Odchodzić (sztuka teatralna)
- Roma Mahieu, Poobiednie Igraszki (sztuka teatralna)
- Jean Reverzy, Odejście (Wydawnictwo Literackie 1981)
- Jean Reverzy, Plac trwogi (Wydawnictwo Literackie 1981)

== See also ==
- Julio Cortázar
- Jorge Luis Borges
