= One Hundred Years of Solitude =

1967 novel by Gabriel García Márquez

- First edition
- Author: Gabriel García Márquez
- Original title: Cien años de soledad
- Translator: Gregory Rabassa
- Language: Spanish
- Genre: Magic realism; family saga
- Publisher: Editorial Sudamericana, Harper & Row (US); Jonathan Cape (UK)
- Publication date: May 1967
- Publication place: Argentina
- English publication date: 1970
- Pages: 422
- OCLC: 17522865

One Hundred Years of Solitude (Spanish: Cien años de soledad, Latin American Spanish: [sjen ˈaɲos ðe soleˈðað]) is a 1967 novel by Colombian author Gabriel García Márquez that tells the multi-generational story of the Buendía family, whose patriarch, José Arcadio Buendía, founded the fictitious town of Macondo. The novel is often cited as one of the great achievements in world literature. It was recognized as one of the most important works of the Spanish language during the 4th International Conference of the Spanish Language held in Cartagena de Indias in March 2007.

The magical realist style and thematic substance of the book established it as an important representative novel of the literary Latin American Boom of the 1960s and 1970s, which was stylistically influenced by Modernism (European and North American) and the Cuban Vanguardia (Avant-Garde) literary movement.

Since it was first published in May 1967 in Buenos Aires by Editorial Sudamericana, the book has been translated into 46 languages and sold more than 50 million copies. The novel, considered García Márquez's magnum opus, remains widely acclaimed and is recognized as one of the most significant works both in the Hispanic literary canon and in world literature.

The novel was adapted into an authorized TV series executive produced by García Márquez's sons, and ran for a total of 16 episodes on Netflix.

== Background ==
In 1965, Gabriel García Márquez was driving to Acapulco for a vacation with his family when he thought of the beginning for a new book; he then turned his car around, asked his wife to manage the family's finances for the coming months, and drove back home to Mexico City. For the next year and a half, García Márquez spent his time writing what would eventually become One Hundred Years of Solitude. Though inspired by Colombian history and his experiences as a journalist, García Márquez was greatly influenced by his maternal grandparents: Nicolás Ricardo Márquez and Tranquilina Iguarán Cotes. A decorated veteran of the Thousand Days' War, Ricardo Márquez's accounts of the rebellion against the conservative Colombian government led his grandson to a socialist outlook. Meanwhile, Tranquilina Iguarán Cotes' superstitious beliefs became the foundation of the book's style. The couple's house in Aracataca where García Márquez spent his childhood inspired him to make Macondo his book's setting.

García Márquez was one of the four Latin American novelists first included in the literary Latin American Boom of the 1960s and 1970s; the other three were the Peruvian Mario Vargas Llosa, the Argentine Julio Cortázar, and the Mexican Carlos Fuentes. In 1967, the book earned García Márquez international fame as a novelist of the magical realism movement within Latin American literature. The English translation by Gregory Rabassa was published in 1970; García Márquez famously praised Rabassa's work, stating that he preferred the English translation to his original Spanish text.

== Plot ==
The book tells the story of seven generations of the Buendía family in the town of Macondo. The founders of Macondo, José Arcadio Buendía and Úrsula Iguarán, leave their hometown after José Arcadio kills Prudencio Aguilar after a cockfight for suggesting José Arcadio is impotent. One night, after days of wandering the jungle, while camping on a riverbank José Arcadio dreams of "Macondo", a utopic city of mirrors that reflects the world in and about it. Upon awakening, he decides to establish Macondo at the riverside.

José Arcadio Buendía believes Macondo to be surrounded by water, and from that island, he invents the world according to his perceptions. Soon after its founding, Macondo becomes a town frequented by unusual and extraordinary events that involve the generations of the Buendía family, who are unable or unwilling to escape their periodic (mostly self-inflicted) misfortunes. For years, the town is solitary and unconnected to the outside world, except for the annual visit of a band of gypsies, who show the townspeople scientific discoveries such as magnets, telescopes, and ice. The leader of the gypsies, a man named Melquíades, maintains a close friendship with José Arcadio, who becomes increasingly withdrawn, obsessed with investigating the mysteries of the universe presented to him by the gypsies.

José Arcadio Buendía's firstborn son, José Arcadio, flees with the gypsies after an affair with the free-spirited fortune-teller Pilar Ternera, prompting Ursula to search for him and return with refugees. The Buendías adopt Rebeca, a young orphan girl who consumes earth and bites her fingernails, after visiting Macondo carrying her parents' bones. Rebeca unknowingly infects the town with a plague of insomnia, causing the residents to lose their memory and lack of sleep; Melquíades stays with the Buendías after he cures them of the plague, and permanently dies from drowning, becoming the first man to be buried in Macondo; he leaves behind an encrypted booklet. Ultimately, José Arcadio Buendía is driven insane by his impulsive curiosity and paranoia, speaking only in Latin, and is tied to a chestnut tree by his family for many years until his death, causing yellow petals to rain over Macondo. José Arcadio reunites with the Buendías, with his body covered in tattoos. His erratic behavior and his scandalous marriage to Rebeca caused his mother, Ursula, to banish them. José Arcadio later dies from a mysterious gunshot, leaving a trail of blood towards the Buendías' house, while Rebeca remains isolated as a hermit. Amaranta (José Arcadio’s daughter) rejects townsman Pietro Crespi due to her jealous rivalry with Rebeca (who fell in love with Pietro), leaving a heartbroken Pietro to commit suicide. Amaranta spends years remaining single, even after she accidentally burns her hand.

Eventually, Macondo becomes exposed to the outside world and the government of newly independent Colombia, with Don Apolinar Moscote as Macondo's first mayor. A rigged election between the Conservative and Liberal parties is held in town, inspiring Aureliano Buendía (José Arcadio’s secondborn son) to join a civil war against the Conservative government. During the civil war, Aureliano left Macondo to Arcadio (illegetimate son of José Arcadio and Pilar Ternera) who becomes a cruel, ruthless dictator as he begins terrorizing Macondo through brutal warfare and teaching youths to be his soldiers before being punished by Úrsula. As the Conservatives reclaim Macondo, Arcadio surrenders after realizing his arrogance and is sentenced to death by the conservative firing squad. He even fathers three children (the Segundo twins and Remedios the Beauty) with Santa Sofía de la Piedad, whom Úrsula adopts, before his demise. Aureliano, meanwhile, becomes an iconic revolutionary leader, fighting for many years, losing 32 battles, fathering eighteen sons who share his name, and surviving multiple attempts on his life, but ultimately tires of war and signs a peace treaty with the Conservatives. Disillusioned, Aureliano returns to Macondo and spends the rest of his life making tiny goldfishes in his workshop before he dies standing at the chestnut tree surrounded by vultures.

Aureliano Segundo's affairs with Petra Cotes make him wealthy through increased livestock, while José Arcadio Segundo is involved in cockfighting and guiding travelers around river obstacles while working for the banana company. After surviving a massacre at a carnival, Aureliano Segundo marries Fernanda del Carpio, an impoverished aristocratic noble. Fernanda's strict upbringing strains her relationship with the Buendía family, and Úrsula loses her matriarchal role as she grows blind and old before her death. Growing detached from her social circle, Remedios leaves her family as she ascends to heaven after witnessing several men die enamored by her beauty.Meme, Aureliano Segundo's daughter, grows rebellious against her mother, Fernanda, and she has a romantic affair with a young mechanic trailed by yellow butterflies, Mauricio Babilonia; Fernanda has Mauricio shot, leaving him paralysed for the rest of his life, and Meme becomes permanently silent as her mother sends her to the convent.

Years after the civil war, the railroad arrives in Macondo, bringing new technology and many foreign settlers. An American fruit company establishes a banana plantation outside the town and builds its own segregated village across the river. This ushers in a period of prosperity that ends in tragedy as the Colombian army massacres thousands of striking plantation workers, an incident based on the Banana Massacre of 1928. José Arcadio Segundo, the only survivor of the massacre, finds no evidence of the massacre, and the surviving townspeople deny or refuse to believe it happened. While hiding from Fernanda, José Arcadio Segundo spends years secluded in Melquíades' room studying parchment. During four years of ceaseless rainfall, Aureliano Segundo leaves Fernanda and the Buendías to live in decadence with Petra Cotes; his endless treasure hunting and his deceased livestock cause him to lose his entire fortune. The two brothers die at the same time, with their graves accidentally mixed up by the town's drunkards, while their mother, Santa Sofía de la Piedad, leaves Macondo with no intention of supporting the Buendías.

With Fernanda succumbing to her health complications and isolation, her son, José Arcadio, takes over the house as he discovers Úrsula's treasure hidden under her bed; he squanders all of Úrsula's fortune to build a luxurious swimming pool and abuses the four oldest children he invited. In retaliation, the four adolescents drown José Arcadio and steal the fortune, leaving the Buendías' house completely impoverished.

By the novel's end, Macondo has fallen into a decrepit, near-abandoned state after the deluge and capitalist exploitation from the banana company. The relatives of the Buendías all die from their misfortune, natural causes, and old age.

The sole survivors are Amaranta Úrsula and her nephew Aureliano Babilonia, whose parentage (Meme and Mauricio Babilonia) is hidden by his grandmother Fernanda; he and Amaranta Úrsula unknowingly begin an incestuous relationship as Aureliano gets drunk. They have a child born with a pig's tail, fulfilling the long-dead matriarch Úrsula's lifelong fear. Amaranta Úrsula dies in childbirth, and the child is devoured by ants, leaving Aureliano as the last member of the family. Completely alone in abandoned Macondo, Aureliano deciphers the encrypted manuscript Melquíades left behind generations earlier. The manuscript reveals every fortune and misfortune of the Buendía family's generations, who lived through one hundred years of solitude. He also learns of his family heritage as a Buendía. As Aureliano reads the manuscript, a violent windstorm gathers around him, and he learns from the documents that the Buendía family is doomed to be wiped out from the face of the Earth. In the last sentence of the book, the narrator describes Aureliano reading this last line just as the entire town of Macondo is scoured from existence.

== Characters ==
The Buendía family tree

=== First generation ===
==== José Arcadio Buendía ====
José Arcadio Buendía is the patriarch of the Buendía family and the founder of Macondo. Buendía leaves his hometown in Riohacha Municipality, Colombia, along with his wife Úrsula Iguarán, after being haunted by the corpse of Prudencio Aguilar (a man Buendía killed in a duel), who constantly bleeds from his wound and tries to wash it. One night while camping at the side of a river, Buendía dreams of a city of mirrors named Macondo and decides to establish the town in this location. José Arcadio Buendía is an introspective and inquisitive man of massive strength and energy who spends more time on his scientific pursuits than with his family. He flirts with alchemy and astronomy and becomes increasingly withdrawn from his family and community. He eventually goes insane and is tied to a chestnut tree until his death.

==== Úrsula Iguarán ====
Úrsula Iguarán is the matriarch of the Buendía family and is wife and cousin to José Arcadio Buendía. She lives to be well over 100 years old and she oversees the Buendía household through six of the seven generations documented in the novel. She has a business of making candy animals and pastries which she continues until the arrival of Fernanda. She exhibits a very strong character and often succeeds where the men of her family fail, for example finding a route to the outside world from Macondo. She deeply fears her family resuming their incestuous practices as her inbred relatives tended to have animalistic features. From a strong and active matriarch, Úrsula is reduced to a plaything for Amaranta Úrsula and Aureliano in her last years and shrinks to the size of a newborn baby when she finally dies.

=== Second generation ===
==== José Arcadio ====
José Arcadio Buendía and Úrsula's firstborn child, José Arcadio seems to have inherited his father's headstrong, impulsive mannerisms. He eventually leaves the family after he impregnates Pilar Ternera (producing the child Arcadio), a family friend who is much older than he, to chase a Gypsy girl. He unexpectedly returns many years later as an enormous man covered in tattoos, claiming that he has sailed the seas of the world. He marries his adopted sister Rebeca, causing his banishment from the mansion, and he dies from a mysterious gunshot wound, days after saving his brother from execution.

==== Colonel Aureliano Buendía ====
José Arcadio Buendía and Úrsula's second child and the first person to be born in Macondo. He was thought to have premonitions because everything he said came true. He represents not only a warrior figure but also an artist due to his ability to write poetry and create finely crafted golden fish. Before becoming a symbol for the Partido Liberal of Colombia and before the civil war between right and left, Aureliano was married to Julia Maria Gil who like him shared leftists ideals. During the wars he fathered 17 sons by unknown women, all named Aureliano. Four of them later begin to live in Macondo, and in the span of several weeks all of them but one (including those who chose not to remain in Macondo) are murdered by unknown assassins, before any of them had reached thirty-five years of age. He also fathers a son with Pilar Ternera (Aureliano José).

==== Amaranta ====
José Arcadio Buendía and Úrsula's third child, Amaranta grows up as a companion of her adopted sister Rebeca. However, her feelings toward Rebeca turn sour over Pietro Crespi, whom both sisters intensely desired in their teenage years. Amaranta does everything she can to prevent Rebeca and Pietro marrying, even attempting to murder Rebeca. Amaranta dies a lonely and virginal spinster, but comfortable in her existence after having finally accepted what she had become.

In her later years, she becomes a caring figure within the Buendía household, particularly showing affection for her nephew, Aureliano José.

==== Remedios Moscote ====
Remedios was the youngest daughter of the town's Conservative administrator, Don Apolinar Moscote. Her most striking physical features are her beautiful skin and her emerald-green eyes. The future Colonel Aureliano falls in love with her, despite her extreme youth. She dies shortly after the marriage from a blood poisoning illness during her pregnancy. Until soon before the Colonel's death, her dolls are displayed in his bedroom.

==== Rebeca ====
Rebeca is the second cousin of Úrsula Iguarán and the orphaned child of Nicanor Ulloa and Rebeca Montiel. At first, she is extremely timid, refuses to speak, and has the habits of eating earth and whitewash from the walls of the house, a condition known as pica. She arrives carrying a canvas bag containing her parents' bones and seems not to understand or speak Spanish. However, she responds to questions asked by Visitación and Cataure in the Guajiro or Wayuu language. She falls in love with and marries her adoptive brother José Arcadio after his return from traveling the world. After his mysterious and untimely death, she lives in seclusion for the rest of her life.

==== Pilar Ternera ====
Pilar is a local woman who moved to Macondo to escape the man who raped her as a teenager. She sleeps with the brothers Aureliano and José Arcadio. She becomes the mother of their sons, Aureliano José and Arcadio respectively. Pilar reads the future with cards, and every so often makes an accurate, though vague, prediction. She has close ties with the Buendías throughout the whole novel, helping them with her card predictions. She dies some time after she turns 145 years old (she had eventually stopped counting), surviving until the last days of Macondo.

She plays an integral part in the plot as she is the link between the second and the third generations of the Buendía family. The author highlights her importance by following her death with a declaratory "it was the end."

=== Third generation ===
==== Arcadio ====
Arcadio is José Arcadio's illegitimate son with Pilar Ternera, although he never learns about his origins. He is a schoolteacher who assumes leadership of Macondo after Colonel Aureliano Buendía leaves. He becomes a tyrannical dictator and uses his schoolchildren as his personal army and Macondo soon becomes subject to his whims. When the Liberal forces in Macondo fall, Arcadio is shot by a Conservative firing squad.

==== Aureliano José ====
Aureliano José is Colonel Aureliano Buendía's illegitimate son with Pilar Ternera. He joins his father in several wars before deserting to return to Macondo upon hearing that it is possible to marry one's aunt. Aureliano José is obsessed with his aunt, Amaranta, who raised him since birth and molested him as a child, and who rejects the marriage proposal he makes as an adult. He is eventually shot to death by a Conservative captain midway through the wars.

==== Santa Sofía de la Piedad ====
Santa Sofía is a beautiful virgin girl and the daughter of a shopkeeper. She is hired by Pilar Ternera to have sex with her son Arcadio, her eventual husband. She is taken in along with her children by the Buendías after Arcadio's execution. After Úrsula's death she leaves unexpectedly, not knowing her destination.

==== 17 Aurelianos ====
During his 32 civil war campaigns, Colonel Aureliano Buendía has 17 sons by 17 different women, each named after their father. Four of these Aurelianos (A. Triste, A. Serrador, A. Arcaya and A. Centeno) stay in Macondo and become a permanent part of the family. Eventually, as revenge against the Colonel, all are assassinated by unknown assailants, who identified them by the mysteriously permanent Ash Wednesday cross on their foreheads. The only survivor of the massacre is A. Amador, who escapes into the jungle only to be assassinated at the doorstep of his father's house many years later.

=== Fourth generation ===
==== Remedios the Beauty ====
Remedios the Beauty is Arcadio and Santa Sofía's first child. It is said she is the most beautiful woman ever seen in Macondo, and unintentionally causes the deaths of several men who love or lust over her. She appears to most of the town as naively innocent, and some come to think that she is mentally delayed. However, Colonel Aureliano Buendía believes she has inherited great lucidity: "It is as if she's come back from twenty years of war," he said. She rejects clothing and beauty which has the opposite effect and makes her more beautiful. Too beautiful and, arguably, too wise for the world, Remedios ascends to heaven one afternoon, while folding Fernanda's white sheet.

==== José Arcadio Segundo ====
José Arcadio Segundo is Aureliano Segundo's twin brother, and one of Arcadio and Santa Sofía's three children. Úrsula believes that the two were switched in their childhood, as José Arcadio begins to show the characteristics of the family's Aurelianos, growing up to be pensive and quiet. He plays a major role in the banana worker strike, and is the only survivor when the company massacres the striking workers. Afterward, he spends the rest of his days studying the parchments of Melquíades, and tutoring the young Aureliano. He dies at the exact instant that his twin does.

==== Aureliano Segundo ====
Aureliano Segundo is José Arcadio Segundo's twin brother, and one of Arcadio and Santa Sofía's three children. Of the two brothers, Aureliano Segundo is the more boisterous and impulsive, much like the José Arcadios of the family. He takes his first girlfriend Petra Cotes as his mistress during his marriage to the beautiful and bitter Fernanda del Carpio. When living with Petra, his livestock propagate wildly, and he indulges in unrestrained revelry. After the long rains, his fortune dries up, and the Buendías are left almost penniless. He turns to a search for a buried treasure, which nearly drives him to insanity. He dies of an unknown throat illness at the same moment as his twin. During the confusion at the funeral, the bodies are switched, and each is buried in the other's grave (highlighting Úrsula's earlier comment that they had been switched at birth).

==== Fernanda del Carpio ====
Fernanda comes from a ruined, aristocratic family that kept her isolated from the world. She was chosen as the most beautiful of 5,000 girls. She is brought to Macondo to compete with Remedios the Beauty for the title of Queen of the local carnival; however, her appearance turns the carnival into a bloody confrontation. After the fiasco, she marries Aureliano Segundo, who despite this maintains a domestic relation with his concubine, Petra Cotes. Nevertheless, she soon takes the leadership of the family away from the now frail Úrsula. She manages the Buendía affairs with an iron fist. She has three children by Aureliano Segundo: José Arcadio; Renata Remedios, a.k.a. Meme; and Amaranta Úrsula. She remains in the house after her husband dies, taking care of the household until her death.

Fernanda is never accepted by anyone in the Buendía household for they regard her as an outsider, although none of the Buendías rebel against her inflexible conservatism. Her mental and emotional instability is revealed through her paranoia, her correspondence with the "invisible doctors", and her irrational behavior towards Meme's son Aureliano, whom she tries to isolate from the world.

==== Petra Cotes ====
Petra is a dark-skinned mulatto woman with gold-brown eyes similar to those of a panther. She is Aureliano Segundo's mistress and the love of his life. She arrives in Macondo as a teenager with her first husband. After her husband dies, she begins a relationship with José Arcadio Segundo. When she meets Aureliano Segundo, she begins a relationship with him as well, not knowing they are two different men. After José Arcadio decides to leave her, Aureliano Segundo gets her forgiveness and remains by her side. He continues to see her, even after his marriage. He eventually lives with her, which greatly embitters his wife, Fernanda del Carpio. When Aureliano and Petra make love, their animals reproduce at an amazing rate, but their livestock is wiped out during the four years of rain. Petra makes money by keeping the lottery alive and provides food baskets for Fernanda and her family after the death of Aureliano Segundo.

=== Fifth generation ===
==== José Arcadio ====
José Arcadio, named after his ancestors in the Buendía tradition, is Aureliano Segundo and Fernanda's oldest child and follows the trend of previous Arcadios. He is raised by Úrsula, who intends for him to become Pope. After Fernanda's death, he returns from Rome without having become a priest. He spends his days pining for Amaranta, the object of his obsession. Eventually, he discovers the treasure Úrsula had buried under her bed, which he wastes on lavish parties and escapades with adolescent boys. Later, he begins a tentative friendship with Aureliano Babilonia, his nephew. José Arcadio plans to set Aureliano up in a business and return to Rome, but is murdered in his bath by four of the adolescent boys who ransack his house and steal his gold.

==== Renata Remedios (a.k.a. Meme) ====
Renata Remedios, or Meme, is Aureliano Segundo and Fernanda's second child and first daughter. While she doesn't inherit Fernanda's beauty, she does have Aureliano Segundo's love of life and natural charisma. After her mother declares that she is to do nothing but play the clavichord, she is sent to school where she receives her performance degree as well as academic recognition. While she pursues the clavichord with "an inflexible discipline" to placate Fernanda, she also enjoys partying and exhibits the same tendency towards excess as her father.

Meme meets and falls in love with Mauricio Babilonia, but when Fernanda discovers their affair, she arranges for Mauricio to be shot, claiming that he was a chicken thief. She then takes Meme to a convent. Meme remains mute for the rest of her life, partially because of the trauma, but also as a sign of rebellion. Several months after arriving at the convent, she gives birth to a son, Aureliano. He is sent to live with the Buendías. Aureliano arrives in a basket and Fernanda is tempted to kill the child in order to avoid shame, but instead claims he is an orphan in order to cover up her daughter's promiscuity and is forced to "tolerate him against her will for the rest of her life because at the moment of truth she lacked the courage to go through with her inner determination to drown him".

==== Amaranta Úrsula ====
Amaranta Úrsula is Aureliano Segundo and Fernanda's third child. She displays the same characteristics as her namesake who dies when she is only a child. She never knows that the child sent to the Buendía home is her nephew, the illegitimate son of Meme. He becomes her best friend in childhood. She returns home from Europe with an older husband, Gastón, who leaves her when she informs him of her passionate affair with Aureliano. She dies of a hemorrhage after she has given birth to the last of the Buendía line.

==== Mauricio Babilonia ====
Mauricio is a brutally honest, generous and handsome mechanic for the banana company. He is said to be a descendant of the Gypsies who visit Macondo in the early days. He has the unusual characteristic of being constantly swarmed by yellow butterflies, which follow even his lover for a time. Mauricio begins a romantic affair with Meme until Fernanda discovers them and tries to end it. When Mauricio continues to sneak into the house to see her, Fernanda has him shot, claiming he is a chicken thief. Paralyzed and bedridden, he spends the rest of his long life in solitude.

==== Gastón ====
Gastón is Amaranta Úrsula's wealthy, Belgian husband. She marries him in Europe and returns to Macondo leading him on a silk leash. Gastón is about fifteen years older than his wife. He is an aviator and an adventurer. When he moves with Amaranta Ursula to Macondo he thinks it is only a matter of time before she realizes that her European ways are out of place, causing her to want to move back to Europe. However, when he realizes his wife intends to stay in Macondo, he arranges for his airplane to be shipped over so he can start an airmail service. The plane is shipped to Africa by mistake. When he travels there to claim it, Amaranta writes to him of her love for Aureliano Babilonia Buendía. Gastón takes the news in stride, only asking that they ship him his velocipede.

=== Sixth generation ===
==== Aureliano Babilonia (Aureliano III) ====
Aureliano Babilonia, or Aureliano III, is Meme's illegitimate child with Mauricio Babilonia. He is hidden from everyone by his grandmother, Fernanda. He is strikingly similar to his namesake, the Colonel, and has the same character patterns as well. He is taciturn, silent, and emotionally charged. He barely knows Úrsula, who dies during his childhood. He is a friend of José Arcadio Segundo, who explains to him the true story of the banana worker massacre.

While other members of the family leave and return, Aureliano stays in the Buendía home. He only ventures into the empty town after the death of Fernanda. He works to decipher the parchments of Melquíades but stops to have an affair with his childhood partner and the love of his life, Amaranta Úrsula, not knowing that she is his aunt. When both she and her child die, he is able to decipher the parchments. "...Melquíades' final keys were revealed to him and he saw the epigraph of the parchments perfectly placed in the order of man's time and space: 'The first in line is tied to a tree and the last is being eaten by ants'." It is assumed he dies in the great wind that destroys Macondo the moment he finishes reading Melquíades' parchments.

With his death, the Buendía line ends.

=== Seventh generation ===
==== Aureliano ====
Aureliano is the child of Aureliano and his aunt, Amaranta Úrsula. He is born with a pig's tail, as the eldest and long dead Úrsula had always feared would happen (the parents of the child had never heard of the omen). His mother dies after giving birth to him, and, due to his grief-stricken father's negligence, he is devoured by ants.

=== Others ===
==== Melquíades ====
Melquíades is one of a band of Gypsies who visit Macondo every year in March, displaying amazing items from around the world. Melquíades sells José Arcadio Buendía several new inventions including a pair of magnets and an alchemist's lab. Later, the Gypsies report that Melquíades died in Singapore, but he nonetheless returns to live with the Buendía family, stating he could not bear the solitude of death. He stays with the Buendías and begins to write the mysterious parchments, which are eventually translated by Aureliano Babilonia, and prophesy the House of Buendía's end. Melquíades dies a second time from drowning in the river near Macondo and, following a grand ceremony organized by the Buendías, is the first individual buried in Macondo. His name echoes Melchizedek in the Old Testament, whose source of authority as a high priest was mysterious.

==== Don Apolinar Moscote ====
Apolinar Moscote is the father of Remedios Moscote and is a corrupt magistrate who is the first mayor of Macondo. He is largely antagonistic towards the Buendía family.

==== Pietro Crespi ====
Pietro is a very handsome and polite Italian musician who runs a music school. He installs the pianola in the Buendía house. He becomes engaged to Rebeca, but Amaranta, who also loves him, manages to delay the wedding for years. When José Arcadio and Rebeca agree to be married, Pietro begins to woo Amaranta, who is so embittered that she cruelly rejects him. Despondent over the loss of both sisters, he kills himself.

==== Mr. Herbert and Mr. Brown ====
Mr. Herbert is a gringo who shows up at the Buendía house for lunch one day. After tasting the local bananas for the first time, he arranges for a banana company to set up a plantation in Macondo. The plantation is run by the dictatorial Jack Brown. When José Arcadio Segundo helps arrange a workers' strike on the plantation, the company traps the more than three thousand strikers and machine guns them down in the town square. The banana company and the government completely cover up the event. José Arcadio is the only one who remembers the slaughter. The company arranges for the army to kill off any resistance, then leaves Macondo for good. The event is likely based on the Banana massacre that took place in Ciénaga, Magdalena in 1928.

==== Colonel Gerineldo Márquez ====
He is the friend and comrade-in-arms of Colonel Aureliano Buendía. He fruitlessly woos Amaranta.

==== Visitación ====
Visitación is a Guajiro Indian and is the Buendía family’s first housekeeper.

==== Prudencio Aguilar ====
Prudencio Aguilar is a resident of Riohacha who, after losing a cockfight, insults José Arcadio Buendía by implying that he has an unconsummated marriage. Enraged, José Arcadio Buendía kills Prudencio Aguilar with a spear. Aguilar’s ghost subsequently haunts José Arcadio Buendía and, although benevolent in his haunting, the immense guilt forces Buendía to leave Riohacha with his wife, Úrsula, and thus is the catalyst that leads to the founding of Macondo.

==== Father Nicanor Reyna ====
Father Nicanor is the first Catholic priest of Macondo. He arrives to officiate the wedding of Aureliano Buendía and Remedios Moscote but remains in the town after to bring religion to a town he believes to be lacking in faith and builds a cathedral. He uses magic, such as drinking a cup of hot chocolate and levitating, in an attempt to convert the townspeople, which generally works, however Father Nicanor abandons his attempts after speaking with a chestnut tree-bound José Arcadio Buendía and having his own faith wavered by Buendía’s rationalist arguments against God’s existence.

==== Gabriel (Márquez) ====
Gabriel is only a minor character in the novel but he has the distinction of bearing almost the same name as the author. He is the great-great-grandson of Colonel Gerineldo Márquez. He and Aureliano Babilonia are close friends because they know the history of the town, which no one else believes. He leaves for Paris after winning a contest and decides to stay there, selling old newspapers and empty bottles. He is one of the few who is able to leave Macondo before the town is wiped out entirely.

== Symbolism and metaphors ==
A dominant theme in the book is the inevitable and inescapable repetition of history in Macondo. The protagonists are controlled by their pasts and the complexity of time. Throughout the novel the characters are visited by ghosts. "The ghosts are symbols of the past and the haunting nature it has over Macondo. The ghosts and the displaced repetition that they evoke are, in fact, firmly grounded in the particular development of Latin American history", writes Daniel Erickson. "Ideological transfiguration ensured that Macondo and the Buendías always were ghosts to some extent, alienated and estranged from their own history, not only victims of the harsh reality of dependence and underdevelopment but also of the ideological illusions that haunt and reinforce such social conditions."

The fate of Macondo is both doomed and predetermined from its very existence. "Fatalism is a metaphor for the particular part that ideology has played in maintaining historical dependence, by locking the interpretation of Latin American history into certain patterns that deny alternative possibilities. The narrative seemingly confirms fatalism in order to illustrate the feeling of entrapment that ideology can performatively create."

García Márquez uses colours as symbols. Yellow and gold are the most frequently used and symbolize imperialism and the Spanish Siglo de Oro. Gold signifies a search for economic wealth, whereas yellow represents death, change, and destruction.

The glass city is an image that comes to José Arcadio Buendía in a dream. It is the reason for Macondo's location, but also a symbol of its fate. Higgins writes, "By the final page, however, the city of mirrors has become a city of mirages. Macondo thus represents the dream of a brave new world that America seemed to promise and that was cruelly proved illusory by the subsequent course of history." Images such as the glass city and the ice factory represent how Latin America already has its history outlined and is therefore fated for destruction.

There is an underlying pattern of Latin American history in the book. It has been said that the novel is one of a number of texts that "Latin American culture has created to understand itself." In this sense, the novel can be conceived as a linear archive that narrates the story of a Latin America discovered by European explorers, which had its historical entity developed by the printing press. The Archive is a symbol of the literature that is the foundation of Latin American history and also a decoding instrument. Melquíades, the keeper of the archive, represents both the whimsical and the literary. Finally, "the world of One Hundred Years of Solitude is a place where beliefs and metaphors become forms of fact, and where more ordinary facts become uncertain."

The use of particular historic events and characters renders the book an exemplary work of magical realism, wherein the novel compresses decades of cause and effect whilst telling an interesting story.

== Major themes ==
The rise and fall, birth and death of the mythical but intensely real Macondo, and the glories and disasters of the wonderful Buendía family; make up an intensely brilliant chronicle of humankind's comedies and tragedies. All the many varieties of life are captured here: inventively, amusingly, magnetically, sadly, humorously, luminously, truthfully.

=== Subjectivity of reality and magic realism ===
One Hundred Years of Solitude is an example of magic realism, a term coined by German art critic Franz Roh in 1925.

The novel's mythical elements include classical stories alluding to foundations and origins, characters resembling mythical heroes, and the supernatural. Ian Johnston describes the setting of Macondo as "a state of mind as much as, or more than, a geographical place." The novel is distinctive for its "unastonished" tone while describing magical events.

Garcia Márquez maintains individual character identities using third-person narrators, specific point of view narrators, and stream of consciousness.

=== Solitude ===
The town of Macondo was founded in the remote jungles of the Colombian rainforest, far from populated colonial settlements. Many of the early Buendías become solitary, selfish, and egocentric and fail to find true love, such as Aureliano and Remedios the Beauty. This is possibly representative of the aristocratic, land-owning elite who held power in post-colonial Latin America.

Later in the novel, Aureliano Segundo and Petra Cotes fall in love and take joy in helping others in need during Macondo's economic crisis. Aureliano Babilonia and Amaranta Úrsula also find love and have a child. However, this child of incest is born with a pig's tail and dies as an infant.

Bell writes that "The emergence of love in the novel to displace the traditional egoism of the Buendías reflects the emergence of socialist values as a political force in Latin America, a force that will sweep away the Buendías and the order they represent."

=== Fluidity of time ===
García Márquez reuses names and characteristics across many generations in the Buendía family, invoking a circular metaphor of history. Over six generations, all the José Arcadios possess inquisitive and rational dispositions as well as enormous physical strength. The Aurelianos, meanwhile, lean towards insularity and quietude. The alchemist's laboratory serves as a place where the male Buendías can repeatedly indulge their will to solitude, such as attempts to deconstruct the world with reason (José Arcadio Buendía) and endless creation and destruction of golden fish (Colonel Aureliano Buendía). Furthermore, a sense of inevitability prevails throughout the text.

While mostly chronological, the novel also contains flashbacks to the past and long leaps towards future events. For example, the youthful amour between Meme and Mauricio Babilonia appears to occur before the reader learns about the origins of the affair. The novel's first line establishes shifting perspective between the past, present, and future:

Muchos años después, frente al pelotón de fusilamiento, el coronel Aureliano Buendía había de recordar aquella tarde remota en que su padre lo llevó a conocer el hielo.

Translation:

Many years later, as he faced the firing squad, Colonel Aureliano Buendía was to remember that distant afternoon when his father took him to discover ice.

=== Incest ===
The Buendía family engages in incest multiple times. The patriarch of the family, Jose Arcadio Buendía, marries his first cousin, Úrsula. Later generations also have incestuous relationships. Throughout the novel, the family is "haunted by the fear of punishment in the form of the birth of a monstrous child with a pig's tail."

=== Elitism ===
A theme throughout the book is the elitism of the high-status Buendía family, whose self-centeredness prevents them from learning from the mistakes of the past. The Buendía family's literal loving of themselves through incest resembles the Latin American elite's disregard for the law and a detachment from history. José Arcadio Buendía and Ursula fear that since their relationship is incestuous, their child will have animalistic features; even though theirs does not, the final child of the Buendía line, Aureliano of Aureliano and Amaranta Ursula, has the tail of a pig, but have no knowledge of Ursula's omen. The Buendías' family naming is also highly insular: "José Arcadio" appears four times in the family tree, "Aureliano" appears 22 times, "Remedios" appears three times and "Amaranta" and "Ursula" appear twice.

The sprawling Buendía house appears to be a Big House, or hacienda, a large land holding in which elite families lived and managed their lands and laborers. The book focuses squarely on one family in the midst of the many residents of Macondo as a representation of how the poorest of Latin American villages have been subjugated and forgotten throughout the course of Latin American history.

== Interpretation ==
=== Literary significance and acclaim ===
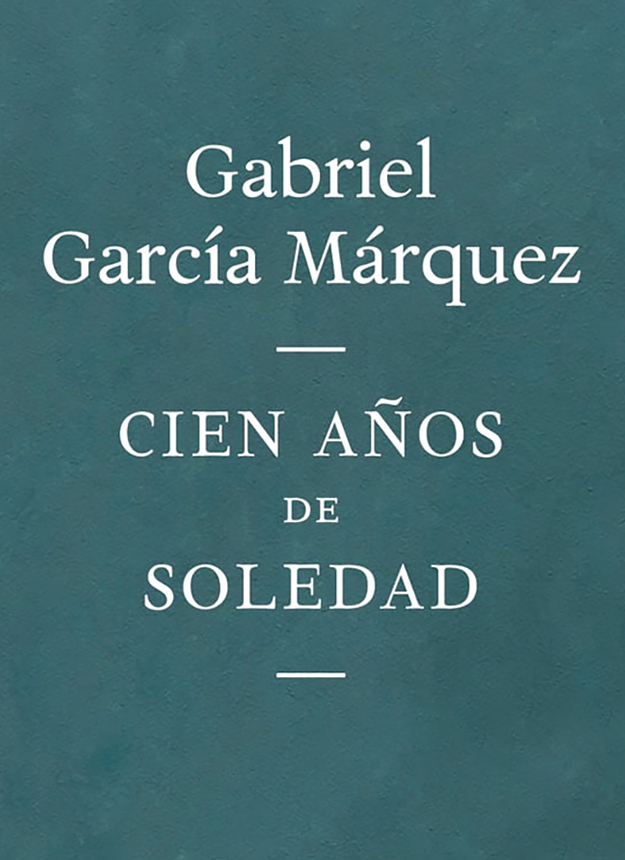

One Hundred Years of Solitude is the first piece of literature since the Book of Genesis that should be required reading for the entire human race. Mr. García Márquez has done nothing less than to create in the reader a sense of all that is profound, meaningful, and meaningless in life.

— William Kennedy, National Observer

The novel has been awarded Italy's Chianciano Award, France's Prix de Meilleur Livre Etranger, Venezuela's Rómulo Gallegos Prize, and the United States' Books Abroad/Neustadt International Prize for Literature. García Márquez also received an honorary LL.D. from Columbia University in New York City. García Márquez received the 1982 Nobel Prize in Literature. The novel topped the list of books that have most shaped world literature over the last 25 years, according to a survey of international writers commissioned by the global literary journal Wasafiri as a part of its 25th-anniversary celebration.

Chilean poet and Nobel Laureate Pablo Neruda called it "the greatest revelation in the Spanish language since Don Quixote of Cervantes", while John Leonard in The New York Times wrote that "with a single bound, Gabriel García Márquez leaps onto the stage with Günter Grass and Vladimir Nabokov."

Antonio Sacoto describes the novel as one of the five most important novels in Hispanic American literature (together with El Señor Presidente, Pedro Páramo, La Muerte de Artemio Cruz, and La ciudad y los perros). These novels are often considered representative of the boom that allowed Hispanic American literature to reach the quality of North American and European literature in terms of technical quality, rich themes, and linguistic innovations.

In his Nobel Prize acceptance speech, García Márquez addressed the significance of his writing and proposed its role to be more than just literary expression:

I dare to think that it is this outsized reality, and not just its literary expression, that has deserved the attention of the Swedish Academy of Letters. A reality not of paper, but one that lives within us and determines each instant of our countless daily deaths, and that nourishes a source of insatiable creativity, full of sorrow and beauty, of which this roving and nostalgic Colombian is but one cipher more, singled out by fortune. Poets and beggars, musicians and prophets, warriors and scoundrels, all creatures of that unbridled reality, we have had to ask but little of imagination, for our crucial problem has been a lack of conventional means to render our lives believable. This, my friends, is the crux of our solitude.

Harold Bloom remarked, "My primary impression, in the act of rereading One Hundred Years of Solitude, is a kind of aesthetic battle fatigue, since every page is rammed full of life beyond the capacity of any single reader to absorb... There are no wasted sentences, no mere transitions, in this novel, and you must notice everything at the moment you read it." David Haberly has argued that García Márquez may have borrowed themes from several works, such as William Faulkner's Yoknapatawpha County, Virginia Woolf's Orlando: A Biography, Defoe's A Journal of the Plague Year, and Chateaubriand's Atala, in an example of intertextuality.

In 2017, Chilean artist Luisa Rivera illustrated a fiftieth anniversary special edition of the book published by Penguin Random House Group Editorial, Spain.

=== Relation to Colombian history ===
As a metaphoric, critical interpretation of Colombian history, from foundation to contemporary nation, the book presents different national myths through the story of the Buendía family, whose spirit of adventure places them amidst the important actions of Colombian historical events. These events include the inclusion of the Roma "Gypsies", the Liberal political reformation of a colonial way of life, and the 19th-century arguments for and against it; the arrival of the railway to a mountainous country; the Thousand Days' War (Guerra de los Mil Días, 1899–1902); the corporate hegemony of the United Fruit Company ("American Fruit Company" in the story); the cinema; the automobile; and the military massacre of striking workers as government–labour relations policy.

==== Inclusion of the Roma ("Gypsies") ====
According to Hazel Marsh, a senior lecturer in Latin American Studies at the University of East Anglia, it is estimated that 8,000 Roma live in Colombia today. However, "most South American history books...exclude the presence of the Roma." One Hundred Years of Solitude differs from this tendency by including the traveling Roma throughout the story. Led by a man named Melquiades, the Roma bring new discoveries and technology to the isolated village of Macondo, often inciting the curiosity of José Arcadio Buendía.

==== Depiction of the Thousand Days' War ====
The Thousand Days' War in Colombia was fought between Liberals and Conservatives from 1899 to 1902. The Conservatives had been "in control more or less constantly since 1867", and the Liberals, mainly coffee plantation owners and workers who had been excluded from representation, sparked a revolution in October 1899. The fighting continued for a few years, and it is estimated that over 130,000 people died.

In Chapters 5 and 6, the Conservative Army has invaded the town of Macondo, leading Aureliano to eventually lead a rebellion. The rebellion is successful – the Conservative Army falls – and, afterwards, Aureliano, now "Colonel Aureliano Buendía", decides to continue fighting. He departs Macondo with the band of people who helped him oust the Conservative Army to go continue fighting elsewhere for the Liberal side.

Because Macondo is a fictional town created by Gabriel García Márquez, the exact events of the Thousand Days' War as they occurred in the book are fictional. However, these events are widely considered to be metaphorical for the Thousand Days' War as experienced by the entire country of Colombia.

==== Martial law ====
In 1928, martial law was declared through Decree No. 1, which ordered the dissolution of any meeting of more than three individuals, allowed the military to shoot the strikers if necessary and prohibited the multitude to move after the military bugle sounds. Differently, the Decree read in front of the station of Macondo is Decree No. 4. However, the content of this decree corresponds to Decree No. 1, with regards to giving the power to the military to shoot to kill. Furthermore, Decree No. 1 corresponds almost exactly to the length of Decree No. 4 read in Macondo, which García Márquez claims to be composed of three articles of eighty words in total. In reality, the official text of Decree No. 1 contains 75 words, and it is composed of three provisions in total as well. Decree No. 4 which, according to García Márquez, called the strikers a “bunch of hoodlums”, was in reality adopted only the day after the massacre took place, 7 December 1928. This Decree was also composed by three provisions and the first article declared the strikers a “cuadrilla de malhechores”, that is, a group of criminals. Additionally, it allowed the army to prosecute any person related to the strike and accused the strikers of setting fire to building, looting, cutting communications and attacking peaceful citizens.

==== Representation of the "Banana Massacre" ====
The "Banana Massacre" occurred December 5–6, 1928, in Ciénaga near Santa Marta, Colombia. Banana plantation workers had been striking against the United Fruit Company to earn better labor conditions when members of the local military fired guns into crowds.

This event, which occurs in Chapter 15, was depicted with relative accuracy, minus a false sense of certainty about the specific facts surrounding the events. For instance, although García Márquez writes that there must have been "three thousand...dead", the true number of victims is unknown. However, the number likely was not far off, because it is considered that the "number of killings was over a thousand", according to Dr. Jorge Enrique Elias Caro and Dr. Antonino Vidal Ortega. The lack of information surrounding the "Banana Massacre" is thought to be largely due to the "manipulation of the information as registered by the Colombian Government and the United Fruit Company". This uncertainty is also reflected in the novel’s portrayal of the aftermath, where official denial is emphasized through a fictional legal response where “ six lawyers argue that ‘the banana company did not have, never had had, and never would have any workers in its service,’ and the court establishes ‘in solemn decrees that the workers did not exist’”. This moment illustrates how the novel mirrors the historical ambiguity and conflicting narratives that surrounded the real event.

== Internal references ==
In the novel's account of the civil war and subsequent peace, there are numerous mentions of the pensions not arriving for the veterans, a reference to one of García Márquez's earlier works, El coronel no tiene quien le escriba. In the novel's final chapter, García Márquez refers to the novel Hopscotch (Spanish: Rayuela) by Julio Cortázar in the following line: "...in the room that smelled of boiled cauliflower where Rocamadour was to die" (p. 412). Rocamadour is a fictional character in Hopscotch who indeed dies in the room described. He also refers to two other major works by Latin American writers in the novel: The Death of Artemio Cruz (Spanish: La Muerte de Artemio Cruz) by Carlos Fuentes and Explosion in a Cathedral (Spanish: El siglo de las luces) by Alejo Carpentier.

== Adaptations ==
Shūji Terayama's play One Hundred Years of Solitude (Hyakunen no kodoku 百年の孤独; originally performed by the Tenjō Sajiki theater troupe) and his film Farewell to the Ark (Saraba hakobune さらば箱舟) are loose (and unauthorized) adaptations of the novel transplanted into the realm of Japanese culture and history.

=== Television series ===
On March 6, 2019, García Márquez's son Rodrigo García Barcha announced that Netflix was adapting the book into a TV series.

On October 21, 2022, Netflix commemorated the fortieth anniversary of the announcement of García Márquez's Nobel Prize in Literature with an exclusive preview of One Hundred Years of Solitude.

On the tenth anniversary of García Márquez's death, Netflix released the official teaser for One Hundred Years of Solitude and revealed that the series will run for sixteen episodes. The cast includes Claudio Cataño (Colonel Aureliano Buendía), Jerónimo Barón (young Aureliano Buendía), Marco González (Jose Arcadio Buendía), Leonardo Soto (José Arcadio), Susana Morales (Úrsula Iguarán), Ella Becerra (Petronila Iguarán), Carlos Suaréz (Aureliano Iguarán), Moreno Borja (Melquiades), and Santiago Vásquez (teenage Aureliano Buendía).

The book is considered by fans to be García Márquez's masterpiece yet he himself refused to sell the screening rights to his novel because he did not want it to be adapted in any language other than Spanish and felt a film adaptation would not cover the entire plot due to its length. For its TV adaptation, Netflix worked with Rodrigo and Gonzalo García who served as the show's executive producers. The episodes were all shot in Colombia, directed by two Colombian and one Argentine director, and all the characters' lines are spoken in Spanish. Barbara Enriquez, who had previously worked on Netflix's Roma, served as the show's production designer. The TV series is Netflix's most expensive Latin American-made project to date, with Colombian groups and indigenous communities making and providing props, and a total of 450 locals building three different versions of Macondo for the progression of the series.

The residents of García Márquez's birthplace, Aracataca, were disappointed that the TV series was not shot there, yet they still hope that it will draw people in.

The TV series ran from 2024 to 2026, faithfully adapting the entire novel in 16 episodes.

== See also ==
- Le Monde's 100 Books of the Century
- List of best-selling books
- One Hundred Years of Solitude (TV series)
- What Remains of Edith Finch
