= Último Round =

- Author: Julio Cortázar
- Translator: First edition
- Language: Spanish
- Publisher: Siglo XXI Editores
- Publication date: 1969
- Pages: 292, 281
- ISBN: 9682303648

Último round (the title translates as Last Round, as in boxing) is a two-volume work by Julio Cortázar published by Siglo XXI in 1969. Containing nearly one hundred articles, essays, poems, short stories, and sketches by Cortázar, it is illustrated with reproductions of various drawings, paintings, and photographs. Portions of the volumes were included in the English-language collection Around the Day in Eighty Worlds.
