= Conversation in The Cathedral =

1969 novel by Mario Vargas Llosa

- First Spanish edition with the title misspelled, as "La Catedral" is the name of a bar and the 'l' should be capitalized.
- Author: Mario Vargas Llosa
- Original title: Conversación en La Catedral
- Language: Spanish
- Publisher: Seix Barral, Barcelona
- Publication date: 1969
- Publication place: Spain
- Media type: Print (Hardback & Paperback)
- Pages: 368 & 308

Conversation in The Cathedral (original title: Conversación en La Catedral) is a 1969 novel by Spanish-Peruvian writer and essayist Mario Vargas Llosa, translated by Gregory Rabassa.

== Plot ==
One of Vargas Llosa's major works, it is a portrayal of Peru under the dictatorship of Manuel A. Odría in the 1950s, and deals with the lives of characters from different social strata. The narrative is built around the stories of Santiago Zavala and Ambrosio respectively; one the son of a wealthy businessman with close ties to the Odría government, the other the businessman’s chauffeur. A random meeting at a dog pound leads to a riveting conversation between the two at a nearby bar known as The Cathedral (hence the title). During the encounter Zavala tries to find the truth about his father's role in the murder of an infamous Peruvian cabaret singer, shedding light on the workings of a dictatorship along the way.

== Background ==
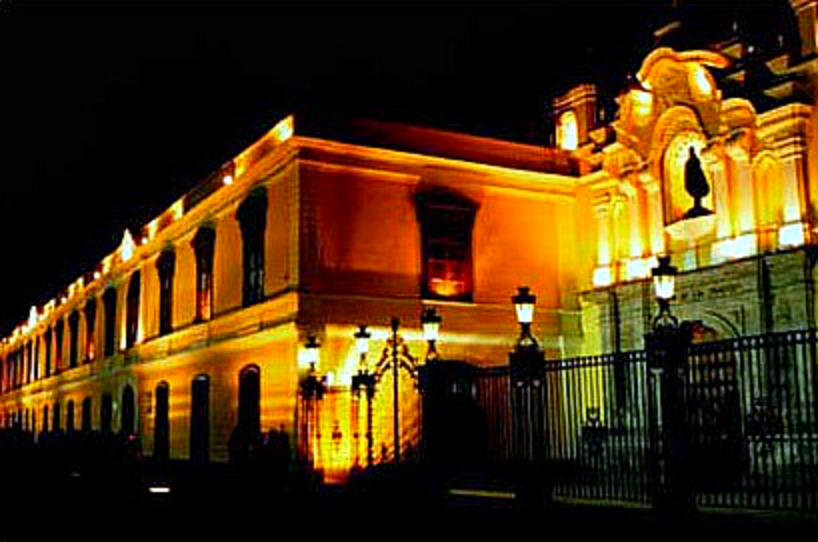
The quatricentenary National University of San Marcos, where the protagonist Santiago Zavala studies, as Mario Vargas Llosa did.

The protagonist of the novel, Santiago Zavala, is a student of the National University of San Marcos in Lima and an activist with the group Cahuide against the dictatorship of the government of Peru; Santiago is based on some real life experiences of Vargas Llosa, during his first years at University of San Marcos and as a member of the activist group Cahuide. In the novel, the protagonist Santiago Zavala depicts a pessimistic view of Peruvian society during the 1950s, at the same time he is embracing the mediocrity. More generally, the novel is an examination of the deep roots of corruption and failure in Peruvian politics and government during the 1950s. The second sentence of the English translation of the novel poses the question "At what precise moment had Peru fucked itself up?"

== Style ==
The novel mixes traditional realism with the experimentation of contemporary Latin American novelists, the French Nouveau roman and the complexity of William Faulkner's narrative style. It is not a linear story, but a collage of conversations where the main conversation between Santiago Zavala and Ambrosio is counterpointed with other conversations that pick up other moments in time and space, resulting in a conversation that covers several decades.

== Critical reception ==
Conversation In The Cathedral is considered to be one of Mario Vargas Llosa's major works that along with The Time of the Hero and The Green House established him as one of the leading authors in the Latin American Boom.

Reviewing the English translation in The New York Times, critic Suzanne Jill Levine described the novel as "a meticulous panorama of the Peru of the late 1940's and early 1950's, when General Odria's dictatorship was like a cancer that ate into the very marrow of Peruvian society", but added that "to consider this novel solely in terms of its subject would be a sad error." "[Vargas Llosa's writing] technique is so complex (...) [but it] would be a pity if the enormous but not insurmountable difficulties of reading this massive novel prevent readers from becoming acquainted with a book that reveals, as few others have, some of the ugly complexities of the real Latin America."

A negative review of the novel appeared in Kirkus Reviews: "Vargas Llosa is an ambitious and impressive craftsman, but Cathedral runs to more grandiose and effusive proportions than his types can sustain and lets down to a series of disconnected yawns. Even the politics are so simplified that everyone — left, right, reform, coalition — looks stupid. On the whole a disappointing performance from a novelist whose earlier Time of the Hero and Green House were superior."

== See also ==
- National University of San Marcos
- Manuel A. Odría
