= 62: A Model Kit =

1968 novel by Julio Cortázar

- First edition
- Author: Julio Cortázar
- Original title: 62/Modelo para armar
- Translator: Gregory Rabassa
- Language: Spanish
- Genre: Experimental, Antinovel
- Publisher: Sudamericana
- Publication date: 1968
- Publication place: Argentina
- English publication date: 1972
- ISBN: 978-0-8112-1437-7
- OCLC: 42935685
- Dewey Decimal: 863 21
- LC Class: PQ7797.C7145 S413 2000

62: A Model Kit (Spanish: 62/Modelo para armar) is a novel by Julio Cortázar published in 1968. It is considered the author's most experimental novel.

== Characters ==
- Juan, Argentinean interpreter.
- Hélène, anesthesiologist living in Paris.
- Polanco, Argentinean. Inseparable friend of Calac.
- Calac, Argentine writer. Inseparable friend of Polanco.
- Tell, Danish.
- Marrast, sculptor.
- Nicole, illustrator.
- Celia, 17-year-old French student.
- Austin, young English lutenist; former anonymous neurotic.
- Frau Marta, old Viennese lady.
- Monsieur Ochs, doll maker.
- Harold Haroldson, superintendent of The Courtauld Institute of Art.
