= PEN/Ralph Manheim Medal for Translation =

The PEN/Ralph Manheim Medal for Translation, named in honor of U.S. translator Ralph Manheim, is a literary award given every three years by PEN America (the U.S. chapter of International PEN) to a translator "whose career has demonstrated a commitment to excellence through the body of his or her work". The Medal is awarded in recognition of a lifetime's achievements in the field of literary translation.

It was first presented in 1982, to Gregory Rabassa, who has translated works by Gabriel García Márquez, Mario Vargas Llosa, and other Latin American literary giants.

The medal is one of many PEN awards sponsored by International PEN affiliates in over 145 PEN centers around the world. The PEN American Center awards have been characterized as being among the "major" American literary prizes. The PEN/Ralph Manheim Medal was called one of "the most prominent translation awards."

== Honorees ==
PEN/Ralph Manheim Medal for Translation honorees
Year	Honoree	Ref.
1982	Gregory Rabassa	
1985	Richard Howard	
1988	Ralph Manheim	
1991	William Weaver	
1994	Richard Wilbur	
1997	Robert Fagles	
2000	Edmund Keeley	
2003	Donald Keene	
2006	Edith Grossman	
2009	Michael Henry Heim	
2012	Margaret Sayers Peden	
2015	Burton Watson	
2018	Barbara Harshav	
2021	Pierre Joris	
2024	Suzanne Jill Levine	
