= Julio Cortázar =

Argentine writer (1914–1984)

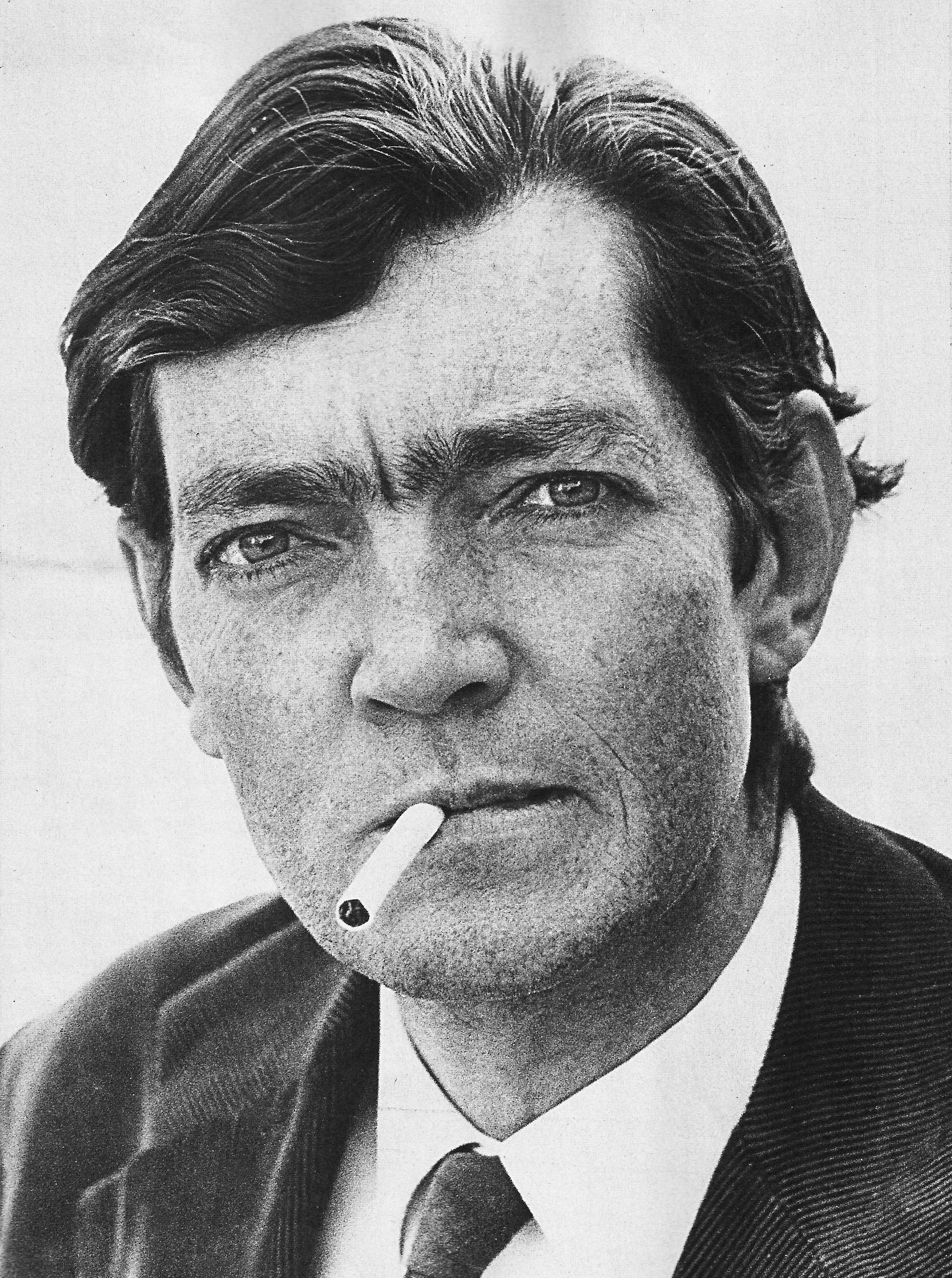
- Cortázar in 1967
- Born: Julio Florencio Cortázar; 26 August 1914; Ixelles, Belgium
- Died: 12 February 1984 (aged 69); Paris, France
- Resting place: Montparnasse Cemetery, Paris
- Occupations: Writer, translator
- Writing career
- Genres: Short story, poetry, novel
- Notable works: Hopscotch; Blow-up and Other Stories
- Notable awards: Prix Médicis (France, 1974), Rubén Darío Order of Cultural Independence (Nicaragua, 1983)
- Movement: Latin American Boom
- Julio Cortázar's voice Recorded 1943

Julio Florencio Cortázar (Latin American Spanish: [ˈxuljo koɾˈtasaɾ]; 26 August 1914 – 12 February 1984) was an Argentine and naturalised French novelist, short story writer, poet, essayist, and translator. Known as one of the founders of the Latin American Boom, Cortázar influenced an entire generation of Spanish-speaking readers and writers in America and Europe.

Cortázar lived his childhood, adolescence, and incipient maturity in Argentina. In 1951, he settled in France for what would prove to be more than three decades. However, he also lived in Italy, Spain, and Switzerland.

== Biography ==
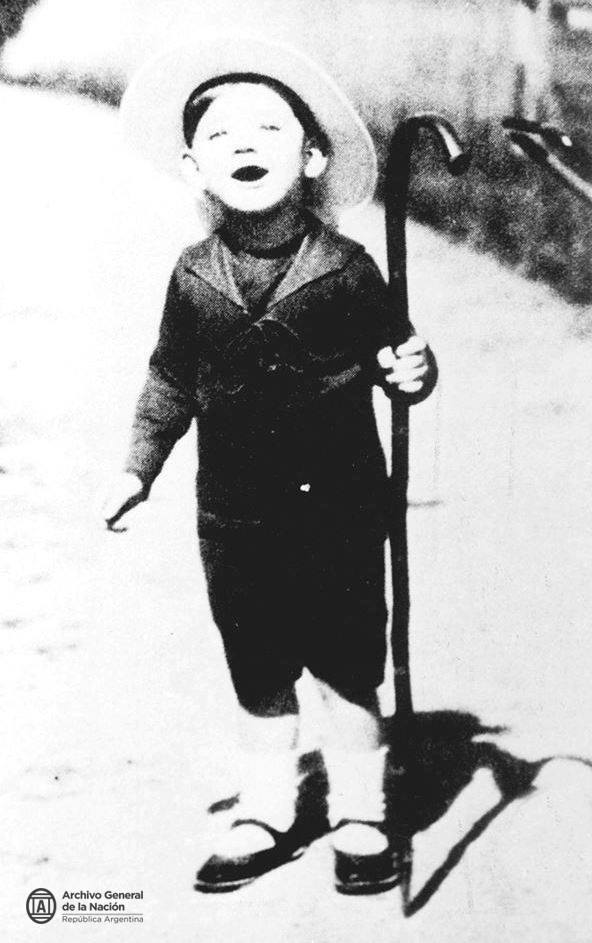
Julio Cortázar at two years of age (Switzerland; 1916).

=== Early life ===
Julio Cortázar was born on 26 August 1914, in Ixelles, a municipality of Brussels, Belgium. According to biographer Miguel Herráez, his parents, Julio José Cortázar and María Herminia Descotte, were Argentine citizens, and his father was attached to the Argentine diplomatic service in Belgium.

At the time of Cortázar's birth, Belgium was occupied by the German troops of Kaiser Wilhelm II. After German troops arrived in Belgium, Cortázar and his family moved to Zürich where María Herminia's parents, Victoria Gabel and Louis Descotte (a French national), were waiting in neutral territory. The family group spent the next two years in Switzerland, first in Zürich, then Geneva, before moving for a short period to Barcelona. The Cortázars settled outside of Buenos Aires by the end of 1919.

Cortázar's father left when Julio was six, and the family had no further contact with him. Cortázar spent most of his childhood in Banfield, a suburb south of Buenos Aires, with his mother and younger sister. The home in Banfield, with its backyard, was a source of inspiration for some of his stories. Despite this, in a letter to Graciela M. de Solá on 4 December 1963, he described this period of his life as "full of servitude, excessive touchiness, terrible and frequent sadness." He was a sickly child and spent much of his childhood in bed reading. His mother, who spoke several languages and was a great reader herself, introduced her son to the works of Jules Verne, whom Cortázar admired for the rest of his life. In the magazine Plural (issue 44, Mexico City, May 1975) he wrote: "I spent my childhood in a haze full of goblins and elves, with a sense of space and time that was different from everybody else's".

=== Education and teaching career ===
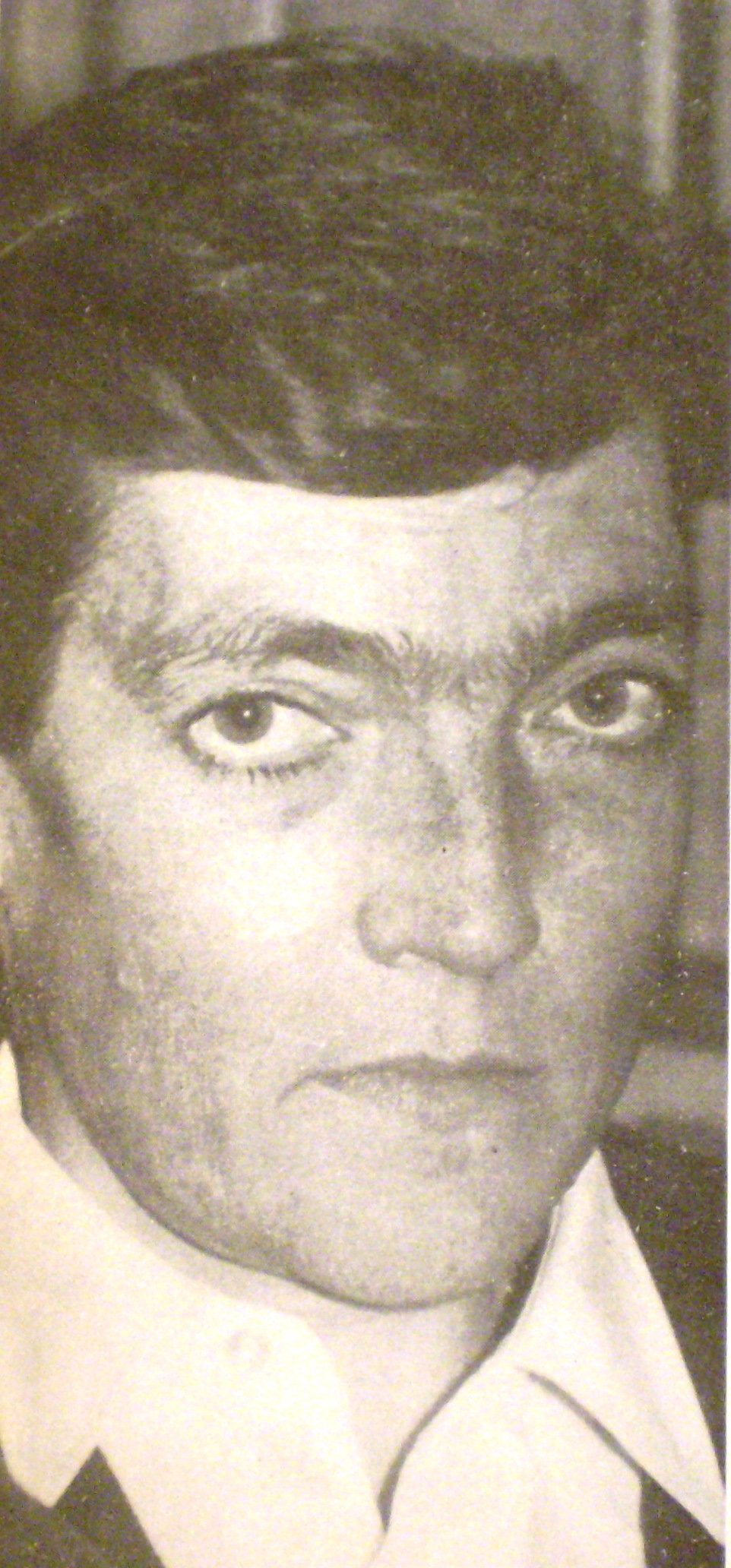
Cortázar in his youth

Cortázar obtained a qualification as an elementary school teacher at the age of 18. He would later pursue higher education in philosophy and languages at the University of Buenos Aires Faculty of Philosophy and Letters, but left for financial reasons without receiving a degree. According to biographer Montes-Bradley, Cortázar taught in at least two high schools in Buenos Aires Province, one in the city of Chivilcoy, the other in Bolivar. In 1938, using the pseudonym of Julio Denis, he self-published a volume of sonnets, Presencia. He later repudiated this work, saying in a 1977 interview for Spanish television that publishing it was his only transgression to the principle of not publishing any books until he was convinced that what was written in them was what he meant to say.

In 1944, he became professor of French literature at the National University of Cuyo in Mendoza, but owing to political pressure from Peronists, he resigned the position in June 1946. He subsequently worked as a translator and as director of the Cámara Argentina del Libro, a trade organization.

In 1949, he published a play, Los Reyes (The Kings), based on the myth of Theseus and the Minotaur.

In 1980, Cortázar delivered eight lectures at the University of California, Berkeley.

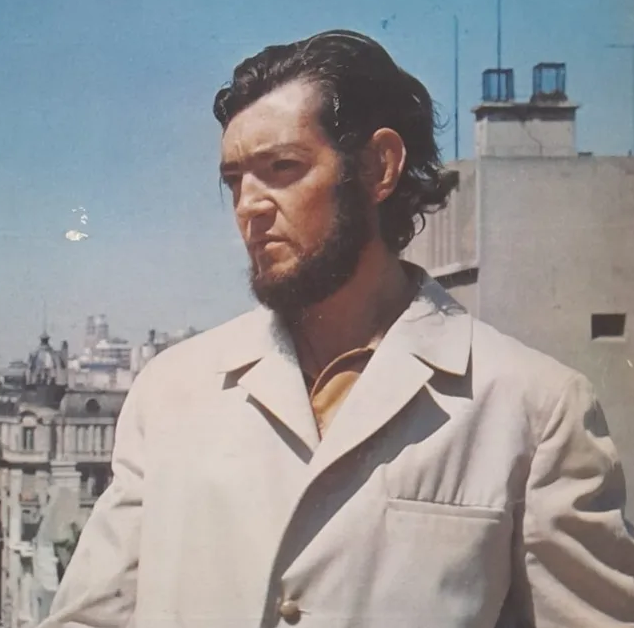
Cortázar in 1970

=== Years in France ===
In 1951, Cortázar immigrated to France, where he lived and worked for the rest of his life, though he travelled widely. From 1952 onwards, he worked intermittently for UNESCO as a translator. He wrote most of his major works in Paris or in Saignon in the south of France, where he also maintained a home. In later years he became actively engaged in opposing abuses of human rights in Latin America, and was a supporter of the Sandinista revolution in Nicaragua as well as Fidel Castro's Cuban revolution and Salvador Allende's socialist government in Chile.

Cortázar had three long-term romantic relationships with women. The first was with Aurora Bernárdez, an Argentine translator, whom he married in 1953. They separated in 1968 when he became involved with the Lithuanian writer, editor, translator, and filmmaker Ugnė Karvelis, whom he never formally married, and who reportedly stimulated Cortázar's interest in politics, although his political sensibilities had already been awakened by a visit to Cuba in 1963, the first of multiple trips that he would make to that country throughout the remainder of his life. In 1981 he married Canadian writer Carol Dunlop. After Dunlop's death in 1982, Aurora Bernárdez accompanied Cortázar during his final illness and, in accordance with his longstanding wishes, inherited the rights to all his works.

=== Last years and death ===
In August 1981, he suffered a gastric hemorrhage; his life was miraculously saved, and he continued to write. President François Mitterrand granted him French nationality. In 1983, after the restoration of democracy in Argentina, Cortázar made one last trip to his homeland, where he was welcomed by his admirers, who would stop him in the street or ask for autographs, in contrast to the indifference of the authorities—President Raúl Alfonsín refused to see him.

Cortázar died in Paris in 1984, and is interred in the cimetière du Montparnasse. The cause of his death was reported to be leukemia, though some sources state that he died from AIDS as a result of receiving a blood transfusion.

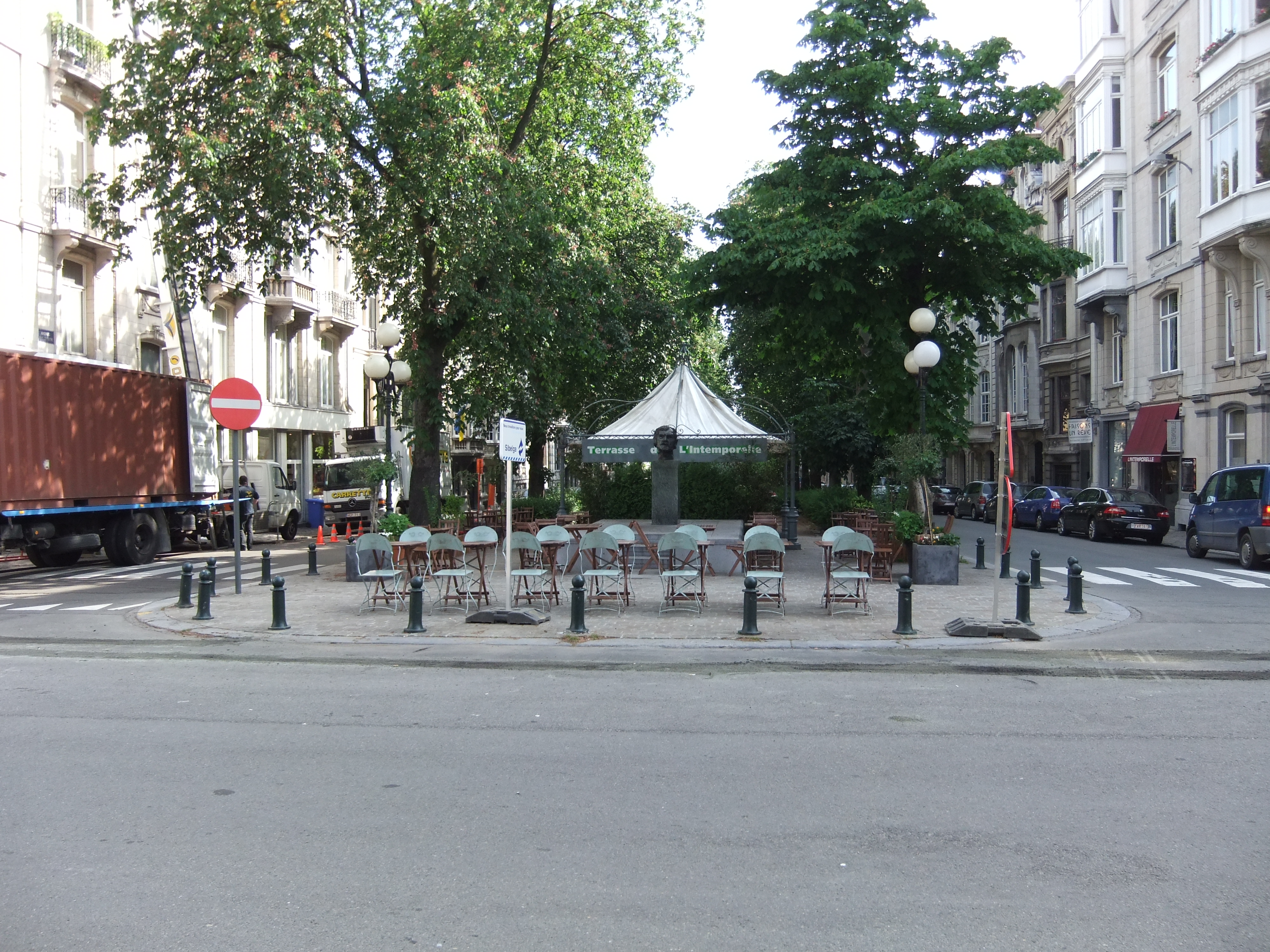
Birthplace of Julio Cortazar in Brussels and a small square opposite. Bust of the Argentine sculptor Edmund Valladares.

== Works ==
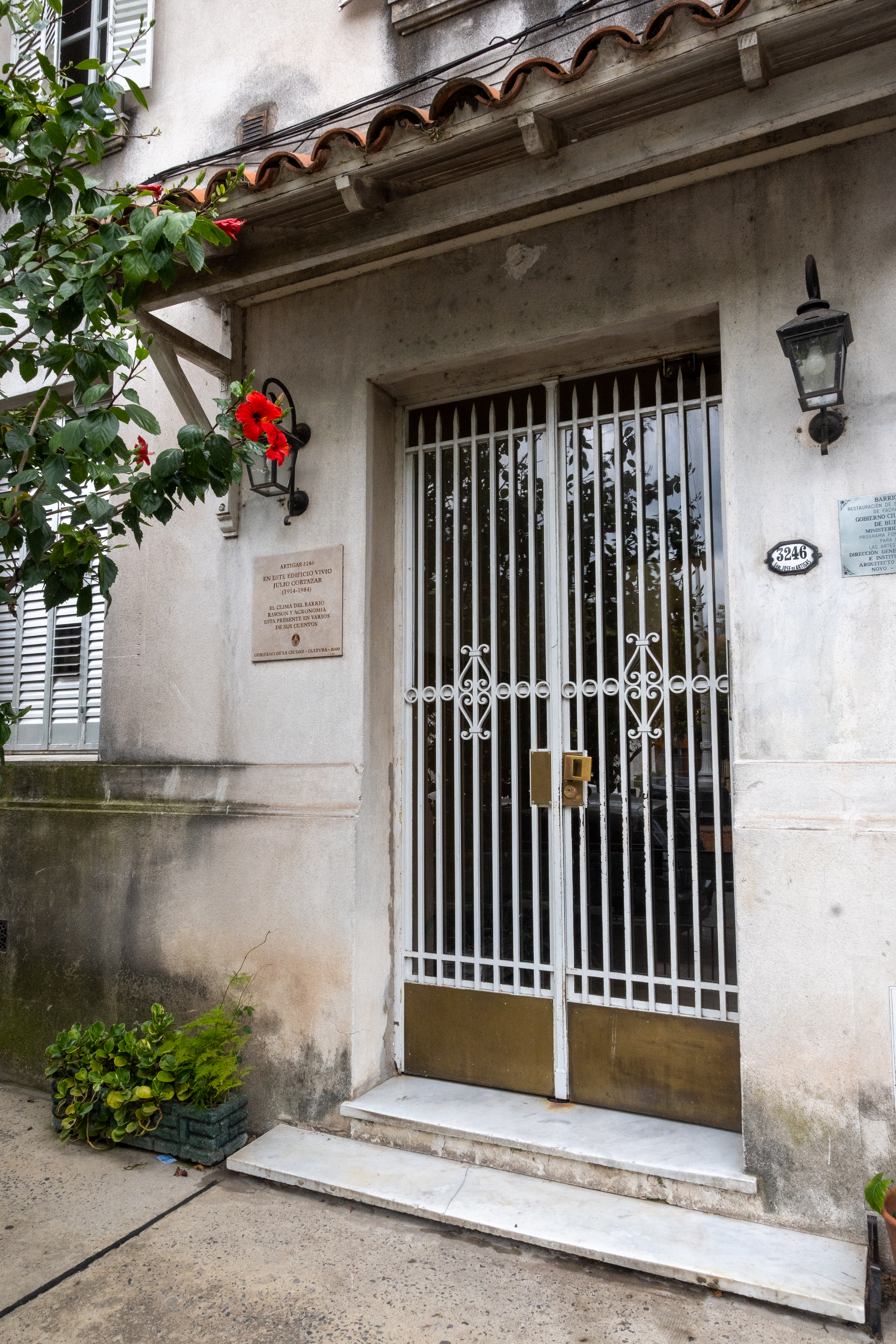
Artigas 3246, Agronomía neighborhood. Last address that Cortázar had in Argentina.

Julio Cortázar started writing in his earliest days at school. His first printed book was a collection of sonnets heavily influenced by Stéphane Mallarmé called Presencia ("Presence"), published under the pseudonym Julio Denis in 1938. He also published a few stories using the same pseudonym. His first major work to be published under his real name was Los Reyes (1949, "The Monarchs"), a poetic drama that passed almost unnoticed. In the late forties Cortázar's short stories however began to attract interest, particularly after the story Casa Tomada ("House taken over") was published in a literary magazine edited by Jorge Luis Borges.

Cortázar became notable for his numerous short stories, collected in such volumes as Bestiario (1951), Final del juego (1956), and Las armas secretas (1959) that established his reputation as a writer of short fiction. Cortázar's stories characteristically include fantastic and mythical elements where the protagonists in initially ordinary situations find themselves in strange or horrific situations. In 1967, English translations by Paul Blackburn of stories selected from these volumes were published by Pantheon Books as End of the Game and Other Stories; it was later re-titled Blow-up and Other Stories. Cortázar published four novels during his lifetime: Los premios (The Winners, 1960), Hopscotch (Rayuela, 1963), 62: A Model Kit (62 Modelo para Armar, 1968), and Libro de Manuel (A Manual for Manuel, 1973). Except for Los premios, which was translated by Elaine Kerrigan, these novels have been translated into English by Gregory Rabassa. Two other novels, El examen and Divertimento, though written before 1960, only appeared posthumously.

Hopscotch, the most significant of his novels, established Cortázar as one of the leading writers of the Latin American Boom in the 1960s and has been called the greatest Latin American novel of the 20th century. Other notable works from this period include Historias de cronopios y famas (1962), a book of brief and eccentric prose passages that resists categorization, and an expanded Final del Juego (1964) including ten additional stories.

Cortázar took influence from English, French and Spanish-American literature, including writers such as Jorge Luis Borges and Edgar Allan Poe. His use of interior monologue and stream of consciousness owes much to James Joyce, but his main influences were Surrealism and the improvisatory aesthetic of jazz. This last interest is reflected in Hopscotch and the notable story "El perseguidor" ("The Pursuer"), which Cortázar based on the life of the bebop saxophonist Charlie Parker.

Cortázar also published poetry, drama, and various works of non-fiction, some of which relate to or accompany visual works. In the 1960s, working with the artist José Silva, he created two almanac-books or libros-almanaque, La vuelta al día en ochenta mundos and Último Round, which combined various texts written by Cortázar with photographs, engravings, and other illustrations, in the manner of the almanaques del mensajero that had been widely circulated in rural Argentina during his childhood. One of his last works was a collaboration with Carol Dunlop, The Autonauts of the Cosmoroute, which relates, partly in mock-heroic style, the couple's extended expedition along the autoroute from Paris to Marseille in a Volkswagen camper nicknamed Fafner. As a translator, he completed Spanish-language renderings of Robinson Crusoe, Marguerite Yourcenar's novel Mémoires d'Hadrien, and the complete prose works of Edgar Allan Poe.

== Influence and legacy ==
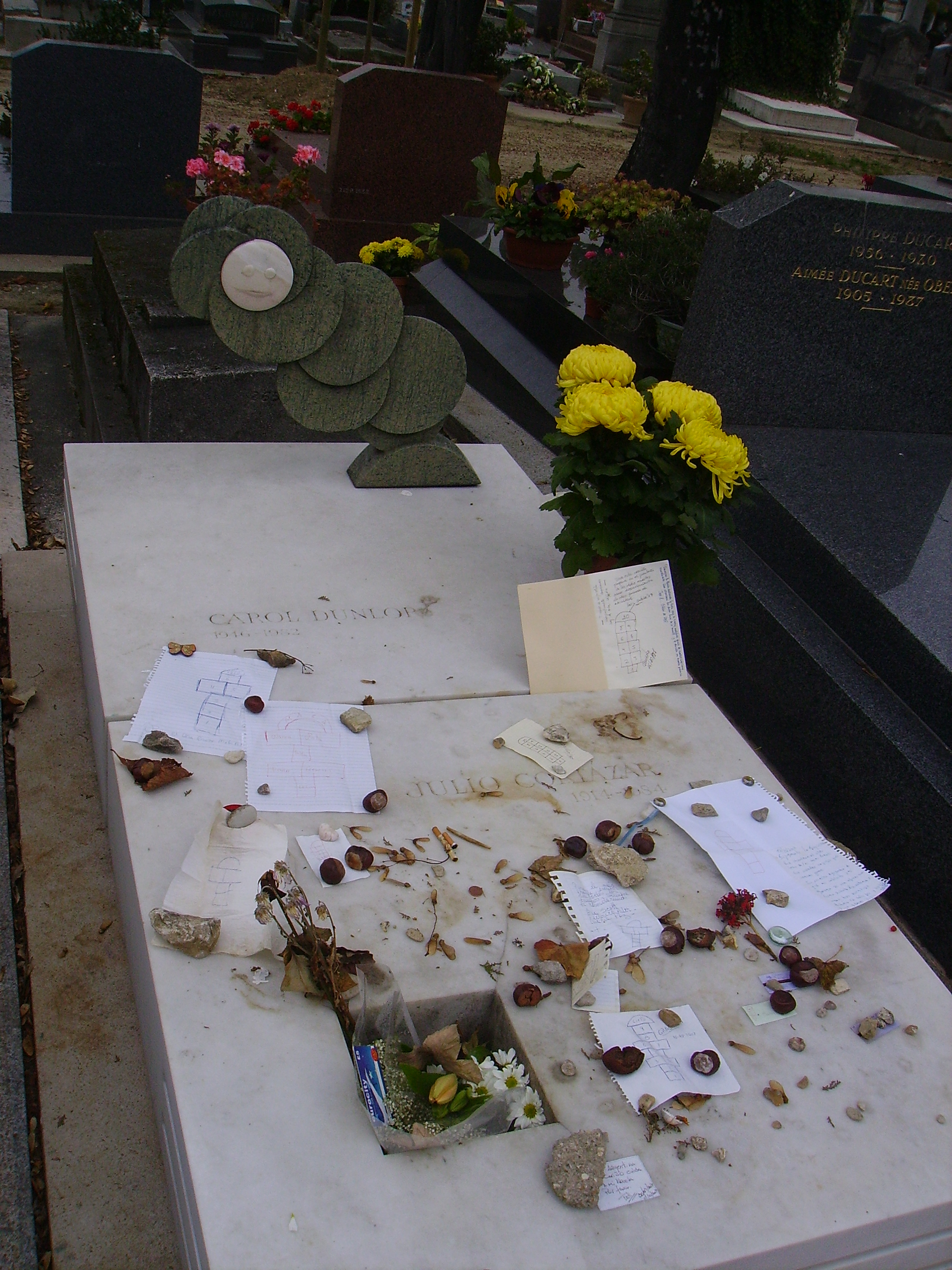
Cortázar's grave in Montparnasse Cemetery, Paris.

Michelangelo Antonioni's film Blowup (1966) was inspired by Cortázar's story "Las babas del diablo", which in turn was based on a photograph taken by Chilean photographer Sergio Larraín during a shoot outside of Notre Dame Cathedral in Paris. Cortázar also made a cameo appearance in Antonioni's film, playing a homeless man who has his photograph taken by David Hemmings' character. Cortázar's story "La autopista del sur" ("The Southern Thruway") influenced another film of the 1960s, Jean-Luc Godard's Week End (1967). The filmmaker Manuel Antín has directed three films based on Cortázar stories, Cartas de mamá, Circe and Intimidad de los parques.

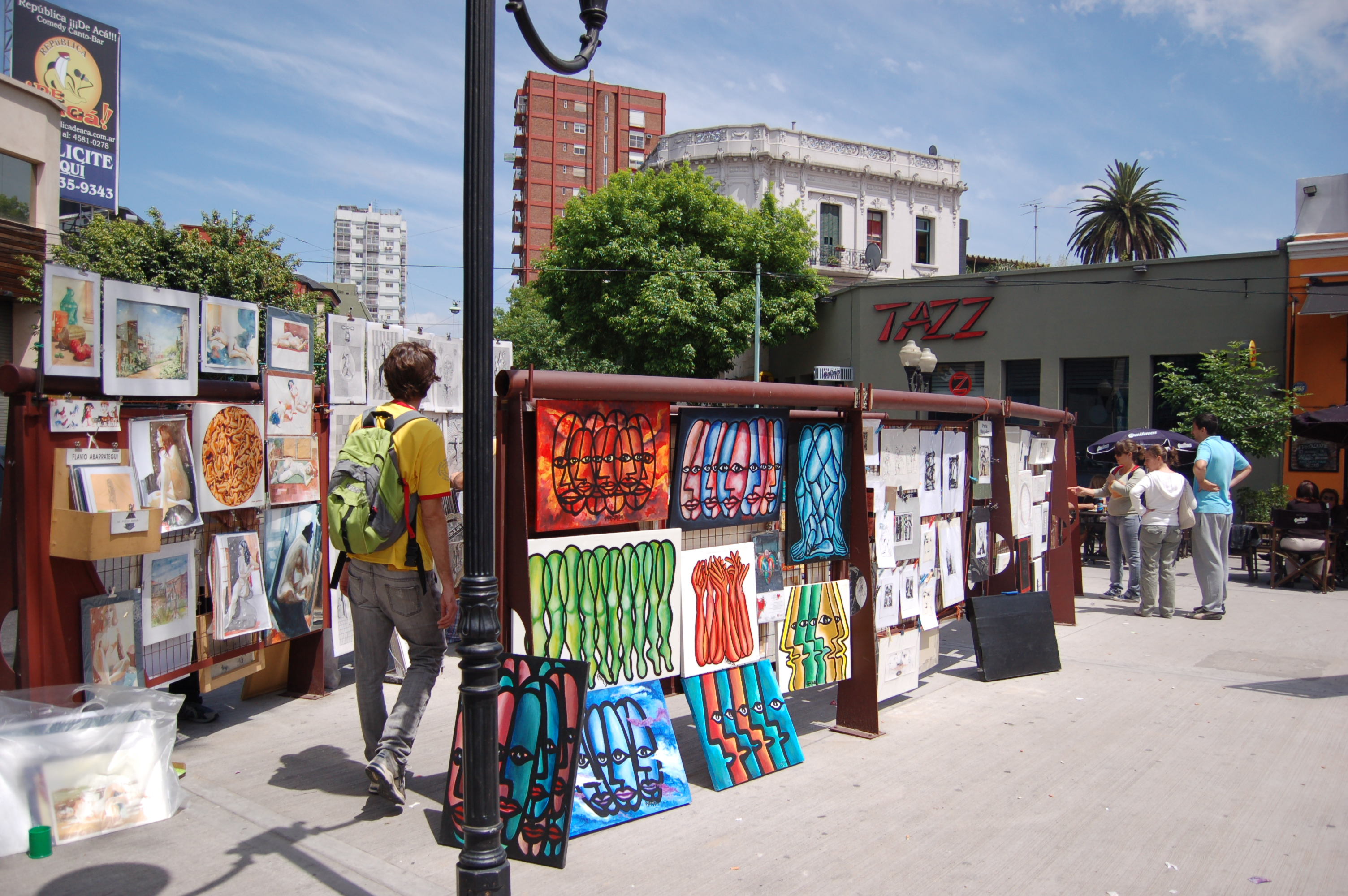
Cortázar Square in the Palermo neighborhood, city of Buenos Aires.

Chilean novelist Roberto Bolaño cited Cortázar as a key influence on his novel The Savage Detectives: "To say that I'm permanently indebted to the work of Borges and Cortázar is obvious."

Puerto Rican novelist Giannina Braschi used Cortázar's story "Las babas del diablo" as a springboard for the chapter called "Blow-up" in her bilingual novel Yo-Yo Boing! (1998), which features scenes with Cortázar's characters La Maga and Rocamadour. Cortázar is mentioned and spoken highly of in Rabih Alameddine's 1998 novel, Koolaids: The Art of War.

North American novelist Deena Metzger cites Cortázar as co-author of her novel Doors: A Fiction for Jazz Horn, written twenty years after his death.

In Buenos Aires, a school, a public library, and a square in the Palermo neighbourhood carry Cortázar's name.

== Bibliography ==
Novels

- Divertimento (1949, first published in 1986)
- El examen (Final Exam) (1950, first published in 1986)
- Los premios (The Winners) (1960)
- Rayuela (Hopscotch) (1963)
- 62/modelo para armar (62: A Model Kit) (1968)
- Libro de Manuel (A Manual for Manuel) (1973)

Short story collections

- Bestiario (1951)
- Final del juego (End of the Game) (1956)
- Las armas secretas (1959)
- Historias de cronopios y de famas (Cronopios and Famas) (1962)
- Todos los fuegos el fuego (All Fires the Fire) (1966)
- Blow-up and Other Stories (1968) (Note: A compilation of stories from Bestiario, Final del juego, and Las armas secretas in English translation.)
- Octaedro (1974)
- Alguien que anda por ahí (1977)
- Un tal Lucas (A Certain Lucas) (1979)
- Queremos tanto a Glenda (We Love Glenda So Much) (1980)
- A Change of Light and Other Stories (1980) (Note: Comprises all the stories appearing in Octaedro, and all but one of the stories ("Usted se tendió a tu lado") that appear in Alguien que anda por ahí.)
- Deshoras (Unreasonable Hours) (1982)
- Bestiary: The Selected Stories of Julio Cortázar (2020)

Poetry

- Presencia (Presence) (1938)
- Salvo el crepúsculo (Save Twilight) (1997; expanded edition, City Lights, 2016)
- Pameos y Meopas (1971)

Plays

- Los reyes (1949)
- Nada a Pehuajó – Adiós, Robinson (1949, Posthumous work)
- Dos juegos de palabras (1991, Posthumous work)
- Adiós, Robinson y otras piezas (1995, Posthumous work)

Other works

- La vuelta al día en ochenta mundos (Around the Day in Eighty Worlds) (1967)
- Último round (Last Round) (1969)
- Prosa del Observatorio (From the Observatory) (1972)
- Territorios (Territories) (1978)
- La Puñalada/ El tango de la vuelta (Stab) (1979) (with Pat Andrea)
- Los autonautas de la cosmopista (Autonauts of the Cosmoroute) (1983)
- Nicaragua tan violentamente dulce (Nicaragua, So Violently Sweet) (1983)
- Julio Cortázar: Al Término del Polvo y el Sudor (Biblioteca de Marcha, Montevideo, 1987) (Note: Essays by and about Julio Cortázar.)
- Diario de Andrés Fava (Diary of Andrés Fava) (1995) (Note: Companion book to El examen.)
- Adiós Robinson (Goodbye, Robinson) (1995), radio text.
- Imagen de John Keats (Image of John Keats) (1996)
- Cartas (Letters) (Three volumes, 2000; expanded version in five volumes, 2012)
- Papeles inesperados (Unexpected Papers) (2009)
- Cartas a los Jonquières (Letters to the Jonquières) (2010)
- Clases de literatura (Literature Class) (2013)

Graphic novel

- Fantomas contra los vampiros multinacionales (Fantomas Versus the Multinational Vampires) (1975)

Translations

- Robinson Crusoe by Daniel Defoe (1945)
- Memoirs of a Midget by Walter de la Mare (1946)
- The Immoralist by André Gide (1947)
- Little Women by Louisa May Alcott(1951)
- Mémoires d'Hadrien by Marguerite Yourcenar (1958)
- Eureka: A Prose Poem by Edgar Allan Poe (1972)

== Filmography ==
- La Cifra Impar, 1960. Feature film by Manuel Antín, based on "Letters from Mother".
- Circe, 1963. Feature film by Manuel Antín, based on "Circe". Script by Manuel Antin and Julio Cortázar.
- El Perseguidor, 1963. Feature film by Osias Wilenski, based on "El perseguidor".
- Intimidad de los Parques, 1965. Feature film by Manuel Antín.
- Blow Up, 1966. Feature film by Michelangelo Antonioni, based on "Las Babas del diablo".
- Cortázar, 1994. Documentary directed by Tristán Bauer.
- Cortázar, apuntes para un documental. Contrakultura Films, 2004. Directed by Eduardo Montes-Bradley.
- Graffiti on YouTube, 2005. Short movie based on Julio Cortázar's short story "Graffiti". Directed by Pako González.
- Graffiti, 2006. Short movie based on Julio Cortázar's short story "Graffiti". Directed by Vano Burduli
- "Mentiras Piadosas" (released in English as Made Up Memories), 2009. Feature film by Diego Sabanés, based on the short story "The Health of the Sick" and other short stories by Julio Cortázar.
- Hareau, Eliane; Sclavo, Lil (2018). El traductor, artífice reflexivo. Montevideo. ISBN 978-9974-93-195-4.

== See also ==
- État second
- Sophie Bohdan
