= Gregory Rabassa =

American literary translator

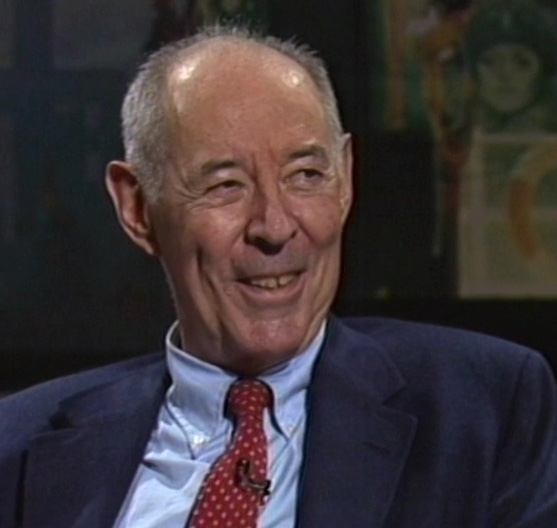
- Rabassa on CUNY TV's Cinema Then, Cinema Now (1990)
- Born: March 9, 1922; Yonkers, New York, US
- Died: June 13, 2016 (aged 94); Branford, Connecticut, US
- Awards: National Medal of Arts (2006); Gregory Kolovakos Award (2001); PEN/Ralph Manheim Medal for Translation (1982); PEN Translation Prize (1977); National Book Award for Translated Literature (1967)

Academic background
- Education: Dartmouth College (BA); Columbia University (PhD)

Academic work
- Discipline: Spanish literature Portuguese literature
- Institutions: Columbia University; Queens College, City University of New York

Gregory Rabassa (March 9, 1922 – June 13, 2016) was an American literary translator from Spanish and Portuguese to English. He taught for many years at Columbia University and Queens College.

== Life and career ==
Rabassa was born in Yonkers, New York, to a family headed by a Cuban émigré. After serving during World War II as an OSS cryptographer, he received a bachelor's degree from Dartmouth. He earned his doctorate at Columbia University and taught there for over two decades before accepting a position at Queens College, City University of New York.

Rabassa translated literature from Spanish and Portuguese. He produced English-language versions of the works of several major Latin American novelists, including Julio Cortázar, Jorge Amado and Gabriel García Márquez. On the advice of Cortázar, García Márquez waited three years for Rabassa to schedule translating One Hundred Years of Solitude. He later declared Rabassa's translation to be superior to the Spanish original.

He received the PEN Translation Prize in 1977 and the PEN/Ralph Manheim Medal for Translation in 1982. Rabassa was honored with the Gregory Kolovakos Award from PEN American Center for the expansion of Hispanic Literature to an English-language audience in 2001.

For his version of Cortázar's novel, Hopscotch, Rabassa shared the inaugural U.S. National Book Award in Translation.

Rabassa taught at Queens College, from which he retired with the title Distinguished Professor Emeritus. In 2006, he was awarded the National Medal of Arts.

He wrote a memoir of his experiences as a translator, If This Be Treason: Translation and Its Dyscontents, A Memoir, which was a Los Angeles Times "Favorite Book of the Year" for 2005 and for which he received the PEN/Martha Albrand Award for the Art of the Memoir in 2006.

== Translation methods ==
Rabassa sometimes translated without having read the book beforehand.

In a 2006 interview with the University of Delaware, Rabassa said "I just let the text lead me along. In my mind, the book I’m translating exists in English even before it’s translated. I just have to pull it out. I do a first draft, “write” the book as the author him- or herself would have written it if they’d spoken English. Ideally, a different style emerges for each author being translated".

== Death ==
Rabassa died on June 13, 2016, at a hospice in Branford, Connecticut. He was 94.

== Selected translations ==
- Demetrio Aguilera Malta
  - Seven Serpents and Seven Moons, 1979 (Siete lunas y siete serpientes)
- Juan Benet
  - Return to Region
  - A Meditation
- Jorge Franco
  - Rosario Tijeras, 2004
- Julio Cortázar
  - Hopscotch 1966 (Rayuela) —U.S. National Book Award for Translation
  - A Manual for Manuel, 1978 (Libro de Manuel)
  - 62: A Model Kit, 1972 (62: Modelo para armar)
- José Maria de Eça de Queirós
  - Saint Christopher
- Gabriel García Márquez
  - One Hundred Years of Solitude 1970 (Cien años de soledad)
  - The Autumn of the Patriarch 1976 (El otoño del patriarca), for which he received the Pen Translation Prize.
  - Chronicle of a Death Foretold 1982 (Crónica de una muerte anunciada)
  - Leaf Storm (La hojarasca)
- Clarice Lispector
  - The Apple in the Dark 1967 (A maçã no escuro, 1961)
- Luis Rafael Sánchez
  - Macho Camacho's Beat 1983 (La guaracha del Macho Camacho)
- José Lezama Lima
  - Paradiso (Paradiso)
- Mario Vargas Llosa
  - Conversation in The Cathedral (Conversación en La Catedral)
  - The Green House (La Casa Verde)
- Machado de Assis
  - Posthumous Memoirs of Bras Cubas (Memórias Póstumas de Bras Cubas)
  - Quincas Borba (Quincas Borba)
- António Lobo Antunes
  - Fado Alexandrino (Fado Alexandrino)
  - The Return of the Caravels (As Naus)
- Osman Lins
  - Avalovara (Avalovara)
- Manuel Mujica Lainez
  - Bomarzo
- Jorge Amado
  - Captains of the Sands (Capitães da Areia)
  - The Double Death of Quincas Water-Bray (A Morte e a Morte de Quincas Berro d'Água)
- Ana Teresa Torres
  - Dona Ines vs. Oblivion (Doña Inés contra el olvido)
- Miguel Angel Asturias
  - Strong Wind (Viento fuerte)
  - The Green Pope (El papa verde)
  - The Eyes of the Interred (Los ojos de los enterrados)
  - The Mulatta and Mr. Fly (Mulata de tal)

== Honours ==
- Commander of the Order of Merit, Portugal (12 November 2011)
