= The Winners (novel) =

Novel by Julio Cortázar

- First edition
- Author: Julio Cortázar
- Original title: Los premios
- Translator: Elaine Kerrigan
- Language: Spanish
- Publisher: Sudamericana
- Publication date: 1960
- Publication place: Argentina
- English publication date: 1965
- Media type: Print (Paperback)

The Winners (Spanish: Los premios) is a novel by Julio Cortázar published in 1960. It was his first published novel (though not the first novel he wrote) and was also the first of his books to be published in English in its entirety.

== Plot ==
The winners of a state lottery, a cross section of the citizens of Buenos Aires, have received tickets for a mysterious luxury cruise. Summoned to meet in a popular café and escorted under the cover of darkness to the secret location of their ship, they embark without knowing where they are headed. Within hours the ship stops; the passengers are informed that a disease has broken out among the crew and that they will be confined to a small section of the ship. In suspense, the passengers mull over their pasts and the future, form attachments and suspicions, tell secrets, explore desires. While some of them merely accept their confinement, others are increasingly driven to confront the crew, leading to an outbreak of violence.

== Writing and publication ==
The novel was published in France under the name Les Gagnants in 1961.

It was published in English (translated by Elaine Kerrigan) in 1965 by Pantheon Books in the US. A UK edition was published in the 1980s by Allison & Busby.

The book was reprinted in 1999 as part of the inaugural catalogue of New York Review Books.
