= Las armas secretas =

Book of short stories by Julio Cortázar

The Secret Weapons
- First edition
- Author: Julio Cortázar
- Original title: Las armas secretas
- Language: Spanish
- Publication date: 1959
- Publication place: Argentina
- Pages: 221

Las armas secretas (translates to The Secret Weapons in English) is a book of five short stories written by Julio Cortázar. The latter four stories appear in translation in the volume Blow-up and Other Stories (alternatively titled The End of the Game and Other Stories); the first story, "Cartas de Mamá," was published by Sublunary Editions as a stand-alone paperback in English translation by Magdalena Edwards in 2022.

== Stories ==
- "Letters from Mom": a story about an Argentine couple living in exile in Paris where they live under the yoke of a dark story that happened before leaving Buenos Aires.
- "Good services" ("At Your Service" in the US translation): a mystery with a strong element of social criticism.
- "The Droolings of the Devil" ("Blow-Up" in the US translation): the story that inspired the film Blowup by Michelangelo Antonioni, marked by digressive, metafictional narration concerning the meaning and facts of an event the narrator interrupted by photographing.
- "The Pursuer": a homage to jazz and the creator of bebop, Charlie Parker, in which Cortázar unfurls countless musical choices, between allegories and metaphors, that reveal to the reader the author's exquisite passion for music.
- "Secret Weapons": a story centering on the conflict between Pierre and Michele, a young couple in Paris after World War II.
