= Donald Shaw (academic) =

Donald Leslie Shaw
- Born: February 11, 1930
- Died: January 30, 2017 (aged 86); Bologna, Italy
- Education: University of Manchester (B.A., M.A.), Trinity College Dublin (Ph.D.)
- Occupations: Writer, Literary Critic, Professor
- Notable work: A Literary History of Spain: The Nineteenth Century, A Companion to Modern Spanish American Fiction, The Generation of 1898 in Spain
- Title: Brown-Forman Professor of Latin American Literature

Donald Leslie Shaw (February 11, 1930 – January 30, 2017 in Italy) was a writer, literary critic, and the Brown-Forman Professor of Latin American Literature at the University of Virginia. He graduated from the University of Manchester (B.A., M.A.) and Trinity College Dublin (Ph.D.). Shaw resided in Italy and would spend each academic semester in Charlottesville, Virginia.

Shaw authored several books, including A Literary History of Spain: The Nineteenth Century and A companion to modern Spanish American fiction Woodbridge, Suffolk, UK; Rochester, N.Y.: Tamesis, 2002. ISBN 1-85566-078-4. Also, he wrote The generation of 1898 in Spain, London, E. Benn, 1975. He wrote extensively on, and taught a course about, Argentine writer Jorge Luis Borges.

Donald Leslie Shaw died on January 30, 2017, in Bologna, Italy.
