= Siglo XXI (publisher) =

Siglo XXI Editores ("21st Century") is an Ibero-American book publisher. It was acquired in 2021 by Capital Intelectual.

The organization was founded in Mexico on November 18, 1965, by Arnaldo Orfila Reynal, the former director of the Fondo de Cultura Económica, who directed it until 1989. Subsequently, Martí Soler, recognized as one of the best editors, directed it for two years.
