= Todos los fuegos el fuego =

- First edition
- Author: Julio Cortázar
- Language: Spanish
- Genre: Short story collection
- Publisher: Sudamericana
- Publication date: 1966
- Publication place: Argentina
- Media type: Print
- Pages: 197

Todos los fuegos el fuego ("All Fires The Fire") is a book of eight short stories written by Julio Cortázar.

== Stories ==
- "La autopista del sur" (South Highway)
- "La salud de los enfermos" (The Health of the Sick)
- "Reunión" (Meeting)
- "La Señorita Cora" (Miss Cora)
- "La isla a mediodía" (The Island At Noon)
- "Instrucciones para John Howell" (Instructions For John Howell)
- "Todos los fuegos el fuego" (All The Fires The Fire)
- "El otro cielo" (The Other Sky)
