= Around the Day in Eighty Worlds =

1967 collection of works by Julio Cortázar

- First edition
- Author: Julio Cortázar
- Original title: La vuelta al día en ochenta mundos
- Language: Spanish
- Publisher: Siglo veintiuno editores
- Publication date: 1967
- Media type: Paperback
- Pages: 179, 193
- ISBN: 84-323-0038-1

La vuelta al día en ochenta mundos is a two-volume collection of short pieces by Julio Cortázar, which was published by Siglo XXI Editores in 1967. Portions of the collection, along with portions of Cortázar's later two-volume collection Último round, were translated by Thomas Christensen and published by North Point Press in 1986 under the title Around the Day in Eighty Worlds. The contents of the North Point volume match the selection (made by the author) for the corresponding French-language edition, Le Tour du jour en quatre-vingt mondes (1980).
