= Libro de Manuel =

1973 novel by Julio Cortázar

- First edition
- Author: Julio Cortázar
- Original title: Libro de Manuel
- Language: Spanish
- Publisher: Sudamericana
- Publication date: 1973
- ISBN: 978-84-663-1303-2
- OCLC: 55509730

Libro de Manuel is a novel by Julio Cortázar, first published in 1973. It was later translated into English by Gregory Rabassa and published in the US as A Manual for Manuel.

Cortázar's only explicitly political novel, it was written as a direct response to the escalating political repression and violence in Argentina and elsewhere in Latin America. Though it received the Medici Award, it garnered a generally indifferent critical reception and was described by the author himself as "the worst of my books". Describing the unfolding of a plot to kidnap a Latin American diplomat, it incorporates into the text a number of news articles reproduced from contemporary newspaper accounts of the political situation in Latin America. Cortázar directed that all the royalties from the book be used to provide assistance to the victims of political repression.
