= Blow-Up and Other Stories =

Short stories by Julio Cortázar

- First edition
- Author: Julio Cortázar
- Translator: Paul Blackburn
- Cover artist: Jaime Davidovich

Blow-Up and Other Stories is a collection of short stories by Argentine author Julio Cortázar, selected from three of his earlier Spanish-language collections: Bestiario (1951), Final del juego (1956), and Las armas secretas (1959). The work was originally published in English translation by Paul Blackburn as End of the Game and Other Stories (1967), before being changed in a subsequent edition to its present title. The story "Blow-Up" served as the inspiration for the film of the same name by Michelangelo Antonioni.

== Contents ==
- One
  - "Axolotl" (first appeared in Final del juego): A man recounts a visit to the aquarium at the Jardin des Plantes during which he becomes fascinated by a group of axolotls, spending hours and eventually entire days staring deeply into their eyes. He begins to identify with their suffering, primarily caused by their narrow confinement, to the point that he eventually experiences (or believes he experiences) a transfer of consciousness between himself and one of the larval salamanders.
  - "House Taken Over" ("Casa Tomada," Los Anales de Buenos Aires, No. 11, December 1946; Bestiario): A brother and sister are driven from their house by an unknown entity.
  - "The Distances" ("Lejana," Bestiario): The story is presented as a series of entries in the diary of Alina Reyes de Aráoz, an upper class Argentine woman living in Buenos Aires, who is about to be married. Alina uses her diary initially to engage in wordplay and the writing of anagrams, before shifting her focus to an elderly, abused old woman who lives far away in Budapest, a person she imagines and dreams about, but has never met. After her marriage, Alina arranges to honeymoon with her husband in Hungary, secretly hoping to meet the old woman. In a postscript, it is revealed that once there, Alina goes by herself to search for a bridge she has seen many times in her dreams where she encounters the old beggar woman. They embrace, but after they let each other go, Alina realizes that they have changed places with each other—the beggar woman, now inhabiting Alina's body, returns to married life, leaving the younger woman in the body of the old crone. Two months later, the marriage ends in divorce.
  - "The Idol of the Cyclades" ("El Ídolo de las Cícladas," Final del Juego)
  - "Letter to a Young Lady in Paris" ("Carta a una señorita en París," Bestiario)
  - "A Yellow Flower" ("Una Flor Amarilla," Final del Juego)
- Two
  - "Continuity of Parks" ("Continuidad de los parques," Final del juego): Sitting comfortably in his study, a man becomes the victim of a murder plotted by the two lovers who are characters in the novel he is reading.
  - "The Night Face Up" ("La Noche Boca Arriba," Final del Juego)
  - "Bestiary" ("Bestiario," Los Anales de Buenos Aires, no. 18–19, August–September 1947)
  - "The Gates of Heaven" ("Las puertas del cielo")
  - "Blow-Up" ("Las babas del diablo," literally "The Droolings of the Devil," Las armas secretas)
- Three
  - "End of the Game"
  - "At Your Service"
  - "The Pursuer"
  - "Secret Weapons"
