= Julián Bonequi =

Mexican musician

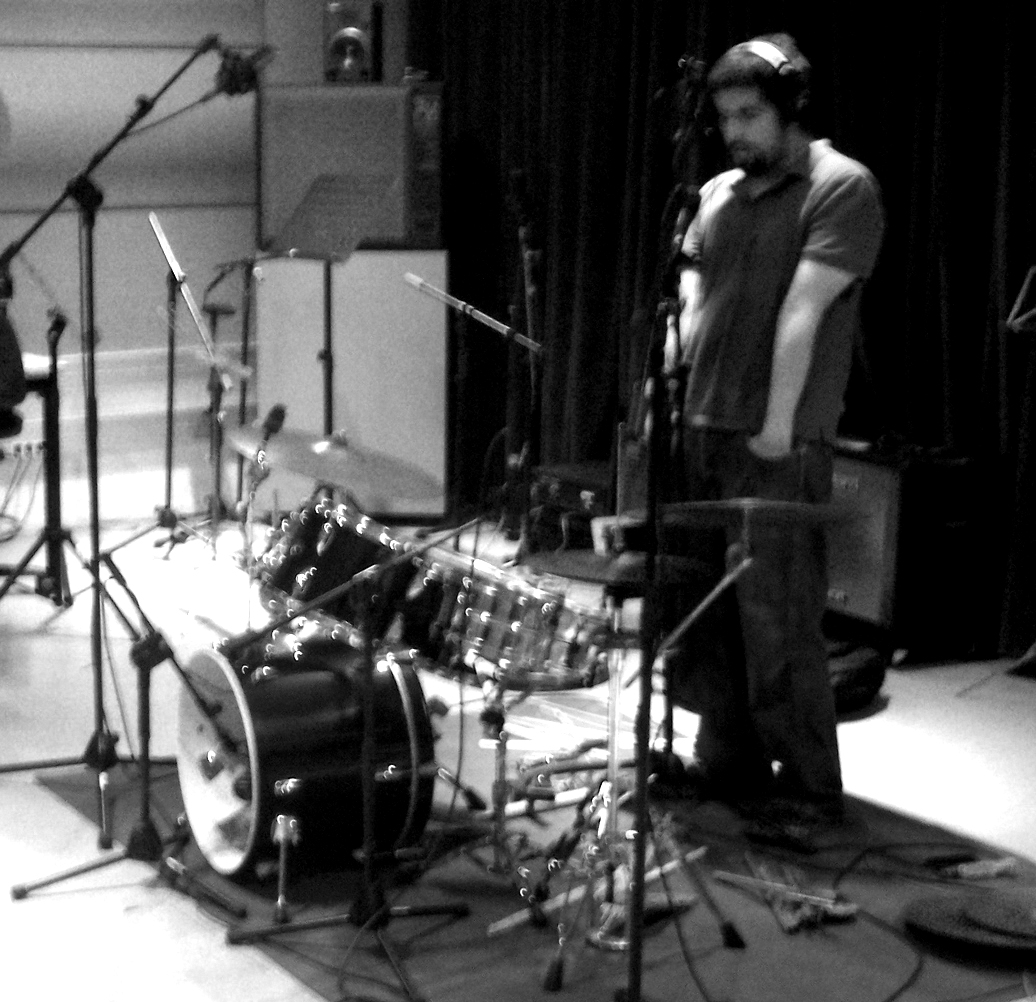
- Julián 2007 at Pompeu Fabra University Studio

Background information
- Also known as: Julian Bonequi
- Born: December 27, 1974 (age 51)
- Origin: Mexico City, Mexico
- Occupations: musician, sonor artist
- Instruments: Drums, vocals, electronics
- Years active: 1995–present
- Labels: Audition Records, Discordian Records, Re:konstruKt Istanbul, Radical Matters, Jazzorca Records, Musea, Surrism-Phonoethics, AMP Records, Mandorla, Headphonica, Audioatalaia

Julián Bonequi (born December 27, 1974) is a Mexican artist working mostly with Noise and Improvisation and 3d computer graphics. He plays the drums, and experiments with electronics and voice to create a rhythmic environment much richer in atmospheres and harmonic flow situations. He played in the FOCO Orchestra (Orquesta FOCO – Madrid) (2006–2011), and create with Dave Tucker and Ricardo Tejero the project Machinations of Joy

Julian Bonequi established himself in Barcelona within the Spanish improvisation free jazz music scene since 2004, but has since also performed with a wide range of musicians working in diverse musical areas since he lived in Mexico. He has performed as guest with the London Improvisers Orchestra as electronic voice, attracted by the roots of free improvisation

From 1995 to 2000 he participated in several projects of folklore, Rock in Opposition and psychedelia in Mexico City.

== Biography ==
=== Early life ===
Since 1995 he played in a lot of punk, psychedelia, stone rock and progressive rock projects, but always trying to give 100% importance to the freedom that improvisation gives to music.

He played with Humus (band) that was founded in 1987 by Jorge Beltrán (guitar, keyboards) and Victor Basurto the full-fledged bassist. Both of them, are formers musician of many other important Mexican bands, as Frolic Froth, Smoking The Century Away, Euphoric Darkness, Loch Ness and Semefo. Since 1997 Westminster became more or less the permanent drummer of Humus, who was preceded by Julian Bonequi (1998–2000) when Jorge Beltrán invited Bonequi to make important contributions to different albums (not yet released).

In 1999 he met Decibel. Decibel were a rare exception to the prog acts of the 1978 period in Mexico, and were well versed in European groups such as Faust, Magma, Gong, and the Italian prog masters Il Balletto di Bronzo. The lineup centered around keyboardist Carlos Robledo and the bassist Walter Schmidt. So he found finally a place for improve his skills and experiment more. With them Julian Bonequi perform in the First International Festival of Progressive Rock in Mexico City, with Magma and Gong also in the program. And the next year, in March 2000 in a concert in the Museum Ex-Teresa Arte Actual in the historic centre of Mexico City, they celebrated the 25th anniversary and present the CD release named Fortuna Virilis, in addition to a retrospective with the work done since 1974. This concert is included in the three-disc box Fiat Lux, and it was the last time Decibel, this legendary Mexican band of Rock in Opposition play together without Javier Baviera, or Jaime Castaneda, but with Julian Bonequi on drums and Juan Carlos Ruiz on bassoon, former musician of Nazca, and leader of Culto Sin Nombre

The same year, in 2000, the Israeli Label, MIO Records produced a 3-disc box called Fiat Lux. The complete recordings. 1977 – 2000, which contains all the studio albums of Decibel, and plus live material and rarities of unedited material. And a small booklet of 28 pages with pictures of the beginnings of the band. Also this box contained the 25th anniversary concert at Ex-Teresa Arte Actual.

With Metaconciencia Julian Bonequi recorded the first album "Bestiario" in 2003 published by the French record label MUSEA Records. The critics received well this music work. A rhythm section perform a colourful and warm instrumental rock with multiple influences: Seventies Progressive rock, jazz-rock, Mexican music The music presented in Bestiario is quite intensive all of which is accompanied by quite an extraordinary drumming.

=== Spain/London ===
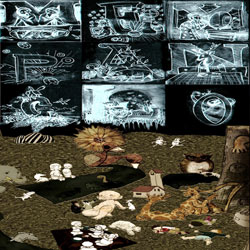
Machinations of Joy with Dave Tucker

Since 2007, based in Barcelona, he played as drummer and percussionist with the FOCO Orchestra of Madrid. An active member of the Collective of Spanish improvisers Musicalibre and the FOCO Orchestra. Guest of London Improvisers Orchestra (2008–2009) in the 10th Anniversary of LIO and in Freedom of the City Festival at Conway Hall (voice/electronics).

In the edition of the Festival Hurta Cordel, celebrated the last week of January 2009, FOCO was conducted by New York experimental jazz composer& musician, William Parker, and they present together in the Palau de la Musica Catalana in Barcelona. In 2010 the conductor was the improviser legend, Keith Tippett.

=== Berlin ===
Edu Comelles ( Coordinator and Creator of Audiotalaia ) a Catalan Sound Artist living in Valencia, and Julian Bonequi ( Project manager and curator ) living since 2010 in Berlin. They decided to create Audition Records. Audition Records documents the development of Improvisation in Europe by both native musicians and international ones who have settled here— musicians whose curiosity extends their sonority concepts all over the world.

Julian Bonequi, resident artist at NK Projekt in 2010, an artist run independent non-profit organization that is dedicated to Sound Arts in Berlin, taking part in the creation and support of a "culture" with a focus on experimental music. Bonequi announced NK as new collaborator of Audition Records, and they decided together to publish selected concerts and performances in agreement with the artists.

Curating and coordinating series in Berlin as associate curator, promoter or project manager since 2012. He was involved in the Ohrengala at Bei Roy, collaborating until October 2012, in RAM, Radical Animation and Musik at K77 in collaboration with Salon Bruit, and in the female soloist serie and documentary episodes in Berlin around improvised, noise and electroacoustic music and contemporary composers, started in February 2013 named Quota;unquota co-curated by Philip Morris aka Sciolist. In winter 2012 Bonequi moved again from Berlin to Mexico City, where he runs and coordinates Audition Records Berlin expanding Audition Records activities to Mexico City.

=== Istanbul ===
January 2011, Audition Records announced a new collaboration with re:kontruKt Istanbul Label after a recording with Korhan Futacı (voice, sax, zurna), Umut Çağlar (guitar), Barlas Tan Özemek (guitar) & Yasemin Mori (voice on track 4 & 5), catalogued re044: The Sun, the Moon & the Stars. Umut Caglar is the curator and project manager of re:konstrukt label.

=== Vienna ===
March 2011: New documents collected in Vienna are published in Audition Records as part from one of the strongest scenes happening in Vienna and working hard since eleven years ago in Austria. Conversations with Dieb13 about klingt.org

=== Krems ===
From 14 to 24 February 2011 Julian led a workshop for the 8B from the Borg Krems. There he showed the students how to work in Mudbox and what they could do in Maya. As a present he received a bottle of wine. In February 2011 Bonequi worked and lived in Krems as Resident Artist at Air-Krems: "... Each day we recorded 15 to 30 minutes of short improvisations, then we edited it and mixed, without overdubs. Always respecting the original improvisation and following differents rules we determined before we played..."

=== Mexico City ===
Spring 2013. Audition Records announces "The Mexican Tour, 8 dates, 5 cities: Mexico City, Guanajuato, Querétaro, Tlaxcala, Guadalajara" – Splits gigs with the Norwegian rock noise trio MoE, organized by Audition Records, and Bonequi coordinating the Tour Management, Logistics and Documentation and performing as soloist as previous act.

== Releases ==
=== Improvised Music ===
- Tabla y Cuchillo Recorded at Liegnitzer Straße 16, Berlin (2012)
- Ultraspießer (Extended Version) Recorded at NK Projekt, Berlin (2011)
- Matarratas (Extended Version) Recorded at NK Projekt, Berlin (2011)
- Reflexiones Acústicas Recorded at NK, Air-Krems, (2011)
- Sangre Azteca Recorded at NK- Berlin (2011)
- Reptilian Mambo Recorded at The Hodge Podge St. (2011)
- Angry Lords Recorded at NK, Air-Krems, Discordian Records (2011)
- Comechingones Recorded at The Hodge Podge St. (2011)
- The Third Mind Recorded at The Hodge Podge St. (2011)
- Ultraspeißer Recorded at NK, (2011)
- ar027 Pandillismo Recorded at Hurta Cordel (2010)
- 044 The Sun, The Moon & The Stars Recorded at re:konstruKt Istanbul (2011)
- arm001 Matarratas Recorded at NK Projekt (2010)
- Tabla y Cuchillo Recorded at Rupprechtstraße 20 (2011)
- Berlin Improvisers Orchestra Recorded at wendel - Nstp.de, Berlin (2010)
- NK Rekordings Recorded at NK Projekt, Berlin (2010)
- Machinations of Joy. "Audiotalaia Netlabel" Music Technology Group St. Universitat Pompeu Fabra. Barcelona (2010)
- Los Idiotes "A.M.P. Records" Music Technology Group St. Universitat Pompeu Fabra. Barcelona-Mexico(2009)
- Decibel Fiat Lux, The complete recordings. 1977 to 2000. "MIO Records". Israel (2000)
- Hans Tammen - Ursel Schlicht Statements en Mexico. CONACULTA and Fundación BBVA Bancomer (2000)

=== NetCompilations ===
- Discordian Records, 2011–2012 Barcelona Recorded at The Hodge Podge St. (2012)
- New Weird Berlin Compilation Recorded at NK Projekt (2010)
- Julian Bonequi & Eduardo Melendez. "Sous les pieds Remix Project". Headphonica NetLabel. France(2009)
- Julian Bonequi & Kenji Siratori "Mandorla Autum Net Project" (2009)

=== NetCollaborations ===
- Sara Herculano SHHHHH! "A.M.P. Record Label" Spain-Mexico (2009)
- The Beauty Noise Featuring Kenji Siratori "AMP Records" (2009)

=== Guest/Releases ===
- Híbridos José Luis Fernández Ledesma "Luna Records" Mexico(2007)
- La Paciencia de Job "Musea Records". Les Classiques du Futur. France(2004)
- Metaconciencia Bestiario, "Musea Records" France (2003)
- Smoking the Century Away "Nuggetphase Records". The Netherlands(2001)

== Netaudio ==
- Not Me, Impronet: The Improvisators Network
