= Final del juego =

1956 book of short stories by Julio Cortázar

- 1964 edition
- Author: Julio Cortázar
- Language: Spanish
- Publisher: Argentine
- Publication date: 1956
- Publication place: Argentine
- English publication date: 1967 (portions)

Final del juego (English End of the Game and Other Stories) is a collection of eighteen works of short fiction by Julio Cortázar.

The volume first appeared in Spanish published by Los Presentes in 1956. In 1963 the collection was first published in English Pantheon Books in 1963, translated by Paul Blackburn. The volume was reprinted by Vintage Books in 1967 under the title Blow-Up and Other Stories.

== Stories ==
=== I ===
- Continuidad de los Parques ("Continuity of Parks")
- No se culpe a nadie ("Don't You Blame Anyone")
- El Río ("The River")
- Los Venenos ("Poisons")
- La Puerta Condenada ("The Doomed Door")
- Las Ménades ("The Maenades")

=== II ===
- El Ídolo de las Cícladas ("The Idol of the Cyclades")
- Una flor amarilla ("A Yellow Flower")
- Sobremesa ("After-Dinner Conversation")
- La Banda ("The Edge")
- Los Amigos ("The Friends")
- El Móvil ("The Mobile")
- Torito ("Little Bull")

=== III ===
- Relato con un Fondo de Agua ("Report with a Water Backdrop")
- Después del Almuerzo ("In the Afternoon")
- "Axolotl"
- La Noche Boca Arriba ("The Night Face Up")
- Final del Juego ("End of the Game")

== Retrospective appraisal ==
"No one can recount one of Cortázar's plots; each text has a certain number of words and precise order. If we try to summarize it, something precious gets lost."—Jorge Luis Borges, "Julio Cortázar: Cuentos, Biblioteca personal" (1984).

The stories in the Final del juego are representative of Cortázar's early fiction: "abstract, allegorical tales colored by the supernatural." A number of these early tales present "an alternative dimension" or "Lo Fantastico." Cortázar acknowledged that these tales were indeed "fantastic" in that "they oppose the false realism that consists of believing that all things can be described and explained according to the philosophical and scientific optimism of eighteen century..."

Literary critic John Ditski describes Julio Cortázar as a "disciple" of fellow Argentine Jorge Luis Borges, and provides representative samples of Cortázar's technical devices, plot structures and themes that characterize his work based on all the stories in the volume.

== Sources ==
- Cortázar, Julio. 1986. Around the Day in Eighty Worlds. North Point Press, San Francisco. Translated by Thomas Chirstensen. ISBN 978-0865472044. Quoted in excerpt from the essay in the New York Times, January 26, 1986. https://www.nytimes.com/1986/01/26/books/the-writer-in-a-trance-anguish-anxiety-and-mircales.html Accessed 1 December 2025.
- Ditski, John. 1983. End of the Game: The Early Fictions of Julio Cortázar. Review of Contemporary Fiction 3, no. 3, (Fall 1983) (pp. 38–44) from Julio Cortázar: A Study of the Short Fiction. 1996. Twayne's Studies in Short Fiction, Gordon Weaver, general editor. Twayne Publishers, New York. ISBN 0-8057-8293-1
- Riley, Brendan. 2022. "Living Like a Word Between Parentheses": On Julio Cortázar's "Letters from Mom." Los Angeles Review of Books, April 3, 2022. https://lareviewofbooks.org/article/living-like-a-word-between-parentheses-on-julio-cortazars-letters-from-mom/ Accessed 2 December 2025.
- Stavans, Ilan. 1996. Julio Cortázar: A Study of the Short Fiction. Twayne's Studies in Short Fiction, Gordon Weaver, general editor. Twayne Publishers, New York. ISBN 0-8057-8293-1
