= Una flor amarilla =

Short story by Julio Cortázar

"A Yellow Flower"
- Short story by Julio Cortázar.
- Original title: Spanish: Una flor amarilla
- Language: Spanish
- Genre: Short story

Publication
- Published in: 1956

"Una flor amarilla" ("A Yellow Flower") is a story by the Argentine writer Julio Cortázar. It belongs to the book Final del juego (End of the Game), published in its first edition by the publishing house Los presentes in 1956.

In 1962 it appeared as a unique work, without reference to the book in which it was originally published, in No. 6 of Revista de Occidente (Year I, 2nd Period), the publication founded by José Ortega y Gasset.

An English language version of the volume was first published by Pantheon Books in 1963 and reprinted under the title Blow-Up and Other Stories by Vintage Press in 1967.

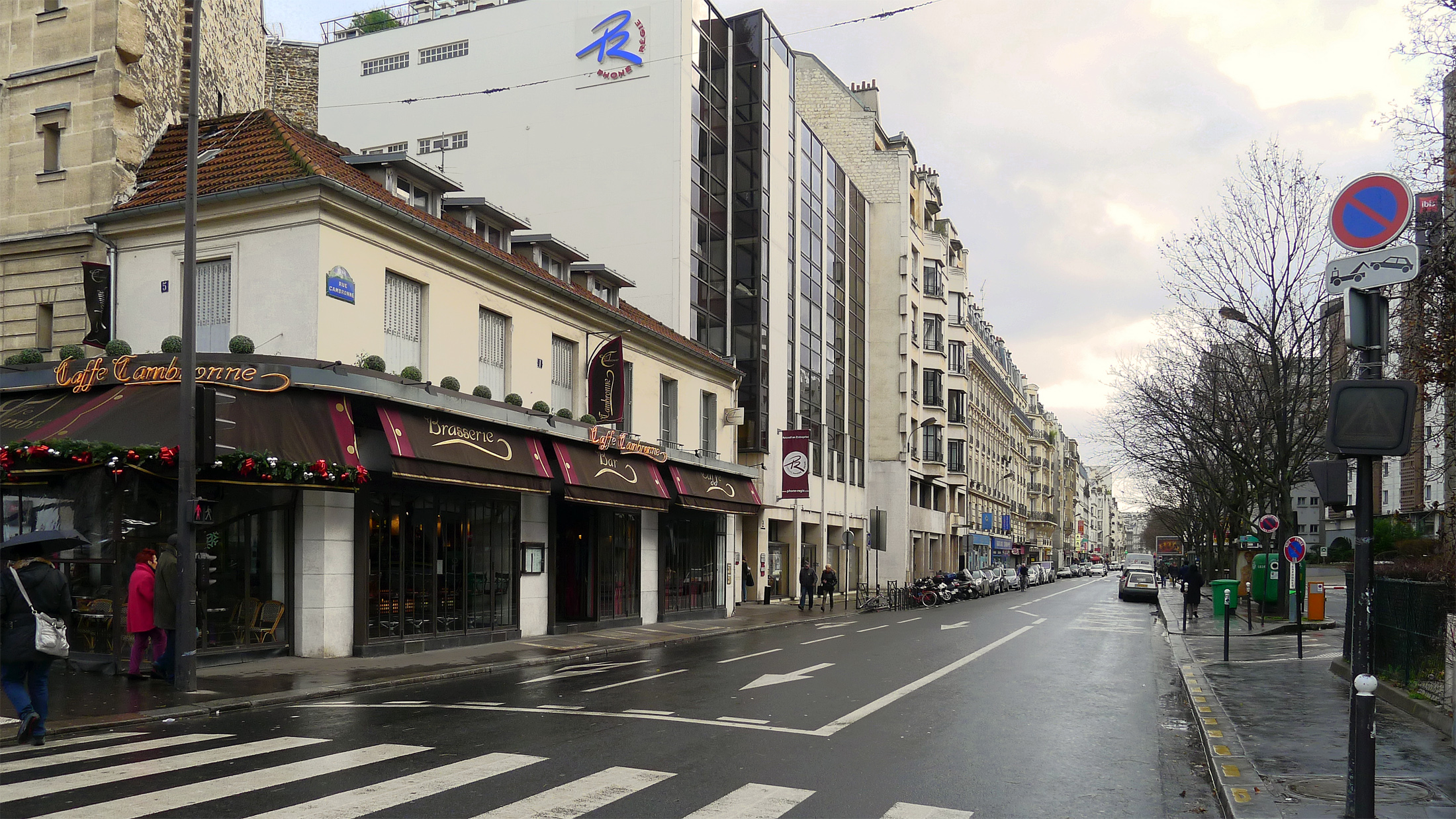
Rue Cambronne in París.

== Plot ==
The story is set in a bistro on rue Cambronne in Paris, France. It is about a man, the protagonist, who meets another, a former municipal employee. The aforementioned assures that people are immortal and that he is the only mortal. During their conversation, the man narrates that he had observed a boy on the bus line 95. His name was Luc. At that moment, he realized that certain characteristics of Luc, such as his mannerisms, appearance, and voice, were very similar to his own at his age. Then he finds out that Luc has had illnesses and has gone through experiences that were also present in his life.

== Background ==
Julio Cortázar on composing “A Yellow Flower”:

I remember the morning when "A Yellow Flower" came to me: the amorphous block was the idea of a man who encounters a youth who looks like him and who begins to suspect that we are immortal. I wrote the opening scenes without the slightest hesitation, but I didn't know where things were going, I didn't even think about the resolution of the story. If someone had interrupted me then to say, "At the end the protagonist will poison Luc," I would have been dumbfounded. At the end the protagonist does poison Luc, but this occurred in the same way as everything that preceded it, like a ball of yarn that unravels as we pull on it.

== Analysis ==
It has been interpreted that this work is part of the look of Latin American writers towards Greco-Latin mythology, specifically in themes present in the plot such as immortality. However, this observation can equally be applied to the author's other works.

== Sources ==
- Cortázar, Julio. 1985. Blow-Up and Other Stories. Pantheon Books, New York. pp. 51-59. ISBN 0-394-72881-5 (paperback)
- Cortázar, Julio. 1986. “Around the Day in Eighty Worlds." North Point Press, San Francisco. Translated by Thomas Christensen. ISBN 978-0865472044.Quoted in excerpt from the essay in the New York Times January 26, 1986. https://www.nytimes.com/1986/01/26/books/the-writer-in-a-trance-anguish-anxiety-and-mircales.html Accessed 01 December, 2025.
- Stavans, Ilan. 1996. Julio Cortázar: A Study of the Short Fiction. Twayne’s Studies in Short Fiction, Gordon Weaver, general editor. Twayne Publishers, New York. ISBN 0-8057-8293-1
