= Casa Tomada =

1946 short story by Julio Cortázar

"House Taken Over"
- Short story by Julio Cortázar
- Illustration for "Casa Tomada" by Norah Borges
- Original title: Casa Tomada

Publication
- Published in: Los anales de Buenos Aires
- Publication date: 1946

"Casa Tomada" (English: "House Taken Over") is a 1946 short story by Argentine writer Julio Cortázar. It was originally published in Los anales de Buenos Aires, a literary magazine edited by Jorge Luis Borges, and later included in his volume of stories Bestiario.

It tells the story of a brother and sister living together in their ancestral home which is being "taken over" by unknown entities. It starts in a realist manner, but gradually introduces elements that strain against verisimilitude. The true nature of the entities is left largely undecided and open to different interpretations that vary depending on the generic conventions one attributes to the story (e.g. fantasy, psychological fiction, magic realism, etc.).

The writer based the house on one located in the city of Chivilcoy in the Province of Buenos Aires, which can still be found in the streets Suipacha and Necochea.

== Plot ==
A male narrator and his sister are introduced, both in their early-forties. Each has faced difficulties in their adult lives, the narrator having lost his fiancée long ago, and the sister (Irene) having denied two suitors who sought her hand in marriage. Inheriting their parents' house and wealth, they live a quiet, usually mundane, domestic existence.

The narrator describes the estate and the siblings' routine in great detail, describing their chores and interests; Irene knits all day, unraveling her work the moment it does not please her, while the narrator collects French literature and buys Irene wool during his visits to the bookstores.

Usually, their home is silent, but when one day the narrator suddenly hears something inside another part of the house, the siblings escape to a smaller section, locked behind a solid oak door. In the intervening days, they become frightened and solemn; on the one hand noting that there is less housecleaning, but regretting that the interlopers have prevented them from retrieving many of their personal belongings. All the while, they can occasionally hear noises from the other side.

Eventually, the narrator hears "them" take over the section of the house he and Irene have been forced into. Hurriedly, the siblings escape the house and find themselves in the street, empty-handed. The narrator locks the front door and tosses the key into the sewer.

== Genre and theme ==
It may be exaggerating to say that all completely successful short stories, especially fantastic stories, are products of neurosis, nightmares or hallucinations neutralized through objectification and translated to a medium outside the neurotic terrain. This polarization can be found in any memorable short story, as if the author, wanting to rid himself of his creature as soon and as absolutely as possible, exorcises it the only way he can: by writing it.—Julio Cortázar in Around the Day in Eighty Worlds(1986)

Novelist and critic Ilan Stavans cites H. P. Lovecraft, and particularly Edgar Allan Poe’s The Fall of the House of Usher (1939) as literary influences on “Casa Tomada.” The story has elements of a Gothic ghost story. “House Taken Over” may convey autobiographical elements according to novelist and critic Ilan Stavans. The setting for the story—a sprawling upper-middle class estate occupied only by a brother and sister who live like husband and wife—suggest Cortázar’s experience with his only sibling, Ofelia, one year his junior. Stavans describes the relationship as “complicated” with “incestuous overtones,” the biographical aspects of which Cortázar declined to discuss in interviews, but acknowledged that he had recurrent dreams of sleeping in the same bed with Ofelia.

The claustrophobic intimacy between the narrator and his sister Irene is dramatized in the following passage:

Whenever Irene talked in her sleep, I woke up immediately and stayed awake. I could never get used to this voice from a statue or a parrot, a voice that came out of the dreams, not from a throat. Irene said that in my sleep I flayed around enormously and shook the blankets off. We had the living room between us, but you could hear everything in the house. We heard each other breathing, coughing, could even feel each other reaching for the light switch when, as happens frequently, neither of us could fall asleep.

Short of any explicit reference to incest, the story serves as a metaphor reflecting the pernicious effects of the Argentine populist dictator Juan Domingo Peron. Peron came to power during period in which the story is set: “House Taken Over” is “more about external powers overwhelming the house and its inhabitants” leaving the couple besieged in their own home, and finally expelled. Critic John Ditsky compares the house to a labyrinth stalked by a modern day Minotaur.

Author Jorge Luis Borges and a literary contemporary of Cortázar offered this assessment of “House Taken Over.”

The theme of the story is the gradual occupation of the house by an invisible presence…His characters are deliberately trivial, ruled by a routine of causal affairs and battles…they accept what is said in the newspapers and the radio. The topography is that of Buenos Aires or Paris and at first we might believe that Cortázar’s stories are mere chronicles. But slowly we feel it isn’t so. The narrator has brought in a very subtle way to terrible universe, one in which happiness is impossible…

== Sources ==
- Cortázar, Julio. 1985. Blow-Up and Other Stories. Pantheon Books, New York. ISBN 0-394-72881-5 (paperback)
- Cortázar, Julio. 1986. “Around the Day in Eighty Worlds." North Point Press, San Francisco. Translated by Thomas Christensen. ISBN 978-0865472044.Quoted in excerpt from the essay in the New York Times, January 26, 1986. https://www.nytimes.com/1986/01/26/books/the-writer-in-a-trance-anguish-anxiety-and-mircales.html Accessed 01 December, 2025.
- Ditski, John. 1983. End of the Game: The Early Fictions of Julio Cortázar. Review of Contemporary Fiction 3, no. 3, (Fall 1983) (pp. 38-44) from Julio Cortázar: A Study of the Short Fiction. 1996. Twayne’s Studies in Short Fiction, Gordon Weaver, general editor. Twayne Publishers, New York. ISBN 0-8057-8293-1
- Stavans, Ilan. 1996. Julio Cortázar: A Study of the Short Fiction. Twayne’s Studies in Short Fiction, Gordon Weaver, general editor. Twayne Publishers, New York. ISBN 0-8057-8293-1
