= Axolotl (disambiguation) =

The axolotl is an animal.

The term axolotl may also refer to:

== Arts and entertainment ==
- Axolotl Press, an American publisher (1988–1996)
- Axolotl tanks, a fictional technology in Dune
- The Old Axolotl, a 2015 novel by Jacek Dukaj
- "Axolotl" (short story), a 1956 short story by Julio Cortázar
- "Axolotl", a 2016 song on The Veils' album Total Depravity

== Science and technology ==
- Axólotl (star)
- Double Ratchet Algorithm, in cryptography (formerly Axolotl Ratchet)
