= Axolotl (short story) =

1956 short story by Julio Cortázar

- Short story by Julio Cortázar

Publication
- Publisher: Los Presentes, Buenos Aires
- Publication date: 1956

"Axolotl" is a work of short fiction by Julio Cortázar, first appearing in the Spanish language collection Final del juego (1956), and first in the English language in End of the Game and Other Stories (1963).

== Plot ==
"Axolotl" is presented from a first-person singular point-of-view by an unnamed but reliable narrator. The story takes place at the Jardin des Plantes in Paris.

Visiting the zoo, the narrator visits the lions and panther enclosures, but finds them pathetic; he proceeds to the aquarium. There he encounters a number of Axolotl salamanders, members of the genus Ambystoma, and finds them mesmerizing. He develops an obsession, returning day after day to peer through the glass into their "little pink aztec faces". The security guard is mildly alarmed at his behavior, but declines to interfere. In time, the narrator fearfully perceives that the salamanders are not merely reptiles, but conscious beings who are taking possession of him. A process of "metamorphosis" ensues, and his mind and body is exchanged with one of the amphibians in a process of replacement.

The narrator now reports from his new existence as a salamander living in the tank. He acknowledges to himself that his condition is permanent: "I am an axolotl for good now, and if I think like a man it's only because every axolotl thinks like a man inside his rosy stone semblance." The narrator is comforted by the thought that the free-living metamorphosed salamander in its human form may write a story about axolotls.

== Analysis ==
Novelist and critic Ilan Stavans places "Axolotl" among those works that Cortázar wrote as a form of therapy to purge his own neurotic anxieties. Cortázar commented on this process:

It may be exaggerating to say that all completely successful short stories, especially fantastic stories, are products of neurosis, nightmares or hallucinations neutralized through objectification and translated to a medium outside the neurotic terrain. This polarization can be found in any memorable short story, as if the author, wanting to rid himself of his creature as soon and as absolutely as possible, exorcises it the only way he can: by writing it.

The narrator in "Axolotl is inexorably drawn into a Borgean "labyrinth". Literary critic John Ditski writes:

"Subject" and "procedure" are one and the same in a Cortázar story…the human creator's delusion that he is in charge of the creative process is ultimately equivalent to his transformation into his subject. The obsessive projection of the creative consciousness involves an entrance into a convoluted state…the looping of which are infinite.

== Sources ==
- Cortázar, Julio. 1985. Blow-Up and Other Stories. Pantheon Books, New York. pp. 51–59. ISBN 0-394-72881-5 (paperback)
- Cortázar, Julio. 1986. "Around the Day in Eighty Worlds." North Point Press, San Francisco. Translated by Thomas Christensen. ISBN 978-0865472044. Quoted in excerpt from the essay in the New York Times, January 26, 1986. https://www.nytimes.com/1986/01/26/books/the-writer-in-a-trance-anguish-anxiety-and-mircales.html Accessed 1 December 2025.
- Ditski, John. 1983. End of the Game: The Early Fictions of Julio Cortázar. Review of Contemporary Fiction 3, no. 3, (Fall 1983) (pp. 38–44) from Julio Cortázar: A Study of the Short Fiction. 1996. pp. 110–123. Twayne's Studies in Short Fiction, Gordon Weaver, general editor. Twayne Publishers, New York. ISBN 0-8057-8293-1
- Stavans, Ilan. 1996. Julio Cortázar: A Study of the Short Fiction. Twayne's Studies in Short Fiction, Gordon Weaver, general editor. Twayne Publishers, New York. ISBN 0-8057-8293-1
