= Audition Records =

- Audition Records logo

Background information
- Origin: Barcelona, Spain. Berlin, Germany
- Occupations: netlabel, documentary archive, e-magazine, producer
- Years active: 2010
- Label: Audition Records
- Website: auditionrecords.com

Audition Records is an e-magazine project born in Berlin in 2010. Audition Records focusing efforts on publishing and promoting artists working on sound improvisation and electroacoustic music. Audition Records is curated by Julian Bonequi, musician and activist living in Berlin until November 2012. Currently the base of Audition Records is in Berlin. The philosophy of this new proposal aims to open a new space on the netaudio community focused on improvised music and live recordings of events and concerts all around the world. And as a mobile project, collecting concerts and concepts around the strong scene based in Europe. Audition Records is a series of documents centered on different compositional approaches of Free Jazz, Echtzeitmusik, Noise, Electroacoustic and all kind of Experimental and improvised music performances.

== History ==
The project was born on 15 January 2010 in Barcelona, after Audioatalaia published the release Machinations of Joy of which Julian Bonequi is former artist. Since that, Edu Comelles (the Coordinator of Audioatalaia, based in Valencia) and Julian Bonequi (project manager and curator of Audition Records) create an exclusive space for the denominated improvised music scene, without matters of the semantic school or the stylistic signature of the musicians.

Audiotalaia Netlabel is a project founded with the aim to release and promote the work from Spanish artists and resident musicians working in Spain. They search for proposals in experimental sound composition, ambient music and electronic music. Audiotalaia was born from a previous project called Talaies Sonores. This project was based on the idea of dialoguing between sound composition and landscape. According to this, they look after artists working on an electronic media framework but keeping an eye into the natural world, the landscape and the environment.

The first Audition Records, with no connection to the Audition Records based in Berlin, was sold in October 1959 by Enoch Light to ABC-Paramount Records. Audition Records was a record label located in Nashville, Tennessee.

=== Collaborations 2010-2011 ===
Audition Records announced new collaborations since its creation with labels, associations, orchestras and festivals of improvised music, independent curators and organisers, radios around Europe. Tempo Reale, Klingt.org, Velak Gala, Connex radio, UmlautRecords, Re:konstruKt Label, NK Projekt, Salon Bruit, Musicalibre, Nedac, Altes Finanzamt.

Audition Records in Berlin. (18.09.2010)Julian Bonequi, resident artist at NK Projekt in 2010, an artist run independent non-profit organization that is dedicated to Sound Arts in Berlin, taking part in the creation and support of a "culture" with a focus on experimental music. Bonequi announced NK as new collaborator of Audition Records, and they decided together to publish selected concerts and performances in agreement with the artists.

Audition Records (13 January 2011) announced a new collaboration with re:kontruKt Istanbul Label after a recording with Korhan Futacı (voice, sax, zurna), Umut Çağlar (guitar), Barlas Tan Özemek (guitar) & Yasemin Mori (voice on track 4 & 5), catalogued re044: The Sun, the Moon & the Stars. Umut Caglar is the curator and project manager of re:konstrukt label.

New documents collected in Vienna are published in Audition Records (15.03.2011) as part from one of the strongest scenes happening in Vienna and working hard since eleven years ago in Austria. Conversations with Dieb13 about klingt.org

==== Documentation ====
The first document released by Audition Records (18/06/2010) was the Ensemble Progresivo. A live performance at XIII International Festival of Improvisation Hurta Cordel 2009. in La Casa Encendida in Madrid. Organised by Musicalibre Association.

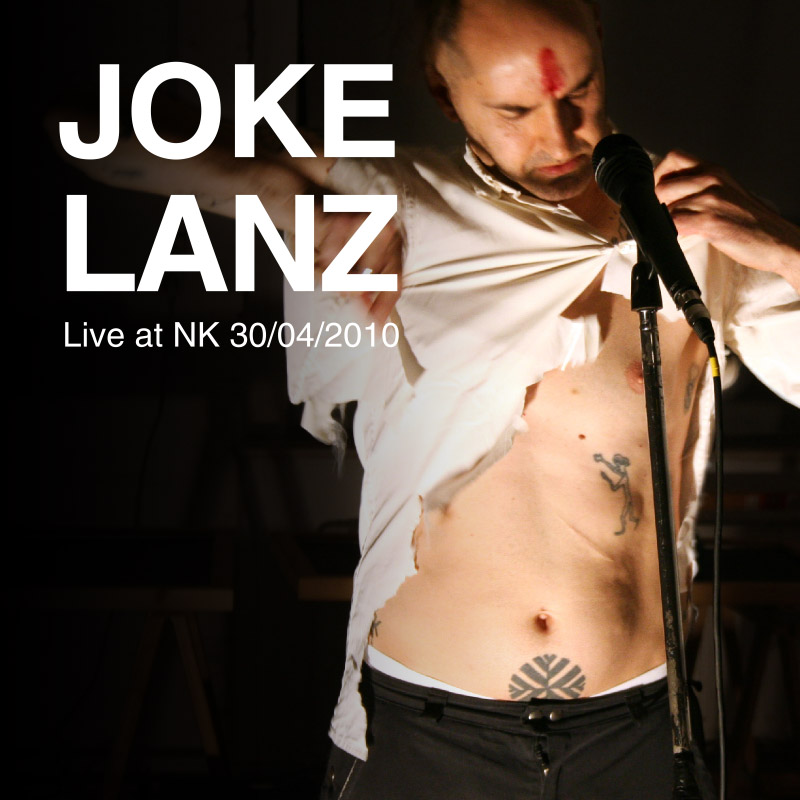

(18/09/10) Audition Records presented new collaborations with musicians and run independent galleries of Berlin as NK Project in September 2010. The first performers are Mat Pogo with a concert live at NK on 29 May 2010.
and Joke Lanz with a live performance also at NK on 30 April 2010).

In October 2010, Audition Records published three new artists.Rinus van Alebeek, a document titled as "titel im Kopf, Klang im Körper Pt.2"". Valentina Vukic, Tripping Through Runtime. And Iain McCurdy with the installation named Pendulum. Recorded on 29 September 2010 at NK

November 2010. Audition Records presented the octet from Barcelona IED8, with a concert live at Robadors recorded on 25 March 2010 and a premiere, the second concert of the new Berlin Improvisers Orchestra, BERIO Live at Wendel, in Berlin (05.09.10)

In December 2010, the documents were Duo, a studio recording titled The Reliable Uncertainty, by Chefa Alonso (soprano saxophone, percussion) and Albert Kaul (piano)
. And also in December but on 21 December 2010, Audition Records closed the year with Chris Jeffs a.k.a. nonprivate, with two concerts. The first one, live at Berghain, and the second, at Dense, both in Berlin. The Canadian artist Sonia Paço-Rocchia, Improvisation for bicycle. And Bèstia Ferida

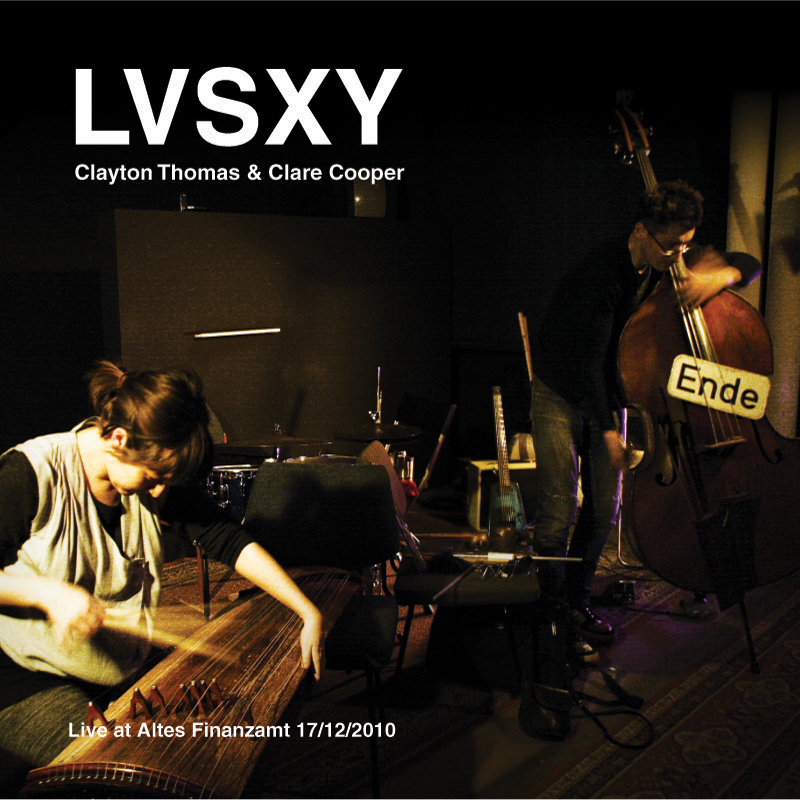

January 2011. Audition Records announced new collaborations with the run independent space for concerts, workshops and theater in Berlin, a place named Altes Finanzamt. With the concert of LVSXY Clare Cooper (guzheng and percussion ) and Clayton Thomas (contrabass and percussion). Another release is Ruben Patño a.k.a. Pato, live at Studio Loos in Den Haag, and after Audition Records visited Istanbul, announced after an interview with Umut Caglar, the owner and curator of Re:konstrukt label, the promotional compilation of the complete catalogue of Re:Konstrukt until then. The document was titled Istanbul Improvised Music Label and contains 39 tracks from all these artists: Korhan Argüden, Umut Çaglar & Özün Usta, Limbo, KonstruKt, Giray Gürkal, Korhan Erel, The League of Extraordinary Gentlemen, Sevket Akinci & Dirk Stromberg, Burcin Elmas & Osman Ozkan, Oguz Buyukberber, Umut Caglar, Korhan Erel & Florent Merlet, Kevin Davis, Demirhan Baylan & Florent Merlet, Dom Minasi String Quartet, Volkan Terzioglu, Nilufer Akbayoglu & Amy Salsgiver, Kevin Davis, Selen Gülün, Mike Cooper & Chris Abrahams, Dilek Gokcen Acay, Islak Kopek, Erdem Helvacioglu, Sarp Keskiner, Mark O'Leary, Olavi Louhivuori & Teppo Hauta-Aho, Randiman Kakara Trio, Yuri Yaremchuk, Ilia Belorukov & Andrij Orel, Meczûp, Alvari Lume, Blaise Siwula, Emre Kartari, Howard Curtis & John D'Earth, konstruKt + Jurg Solothurnmann, Dead Country featuring Eugene Chadbourne, Sarp Keskiner, Have You Seen My Bird?, Gary Hassay, Blaise Siwula & Toshi Makihara, Ellen Christi & Toshi Makihara, Cagri Erdem, Mike Hays & Ekin Cengizkan, Mauro Sambo, Jürg Solothurnmann, Korhan Futaci, Barlas Tan Özemek & Selim Saracoglu.

March 2011. AR presented a special bi-monthly edition with 6 documents from Portugal, Spain and Austria. A record done in Portugal named The Eruption by d'incise: laptop & objects & Gabriel Ferrandini: drums at Namouche Studio in Lisbon
Audition Records moves to Austria in February 2011, and announced new collaborations with Klingt.org. The documents compiled with this idea are: [ar018] dieb13( former artist of klingt.org and curator of the document ar019) OK Night Ars Electronica, & [ar019] klingt.org 11th years of Experimental Music, Vienna. 1 hour 51 minutes of heterogenic artists, styles and music. Artists of this compilation: Takeshi Fumimoto, Angélica Castelló/Okkyung Lee/Matija Schellander, Goh Lee Kwang/Gerald 'Rossi' Rossbacher/Peter Kutin/Manuel Knapp/Tim Blechmann, Glissandinos ( Kai Fagaschinski & Klaus Filip, Noid at 25th Anniversary of Ars Electronica, Pendler ( Markus Marte, Sabine Marte, Oliver Stotz ) and Schnee, live at 5jahre.klingt.org in 2005 with Christof Kurzmann & Burkhard Stangl. The last document Audition presented in March 2011 was from another artist from Vienna and from klingt collective. Billy Roisz in two different projects. SKYLLA (with Silvia Fässler) & KUTIN|ROISZ (with Peter Kutin)

The other two documents of March are [ar021] Fátima Miranda Retrospective 1992-2010 and [ar022] David Moss and Tempo Reale (Center for music research production and education founded by Luciano Berio in 1987), titled Table of Earth

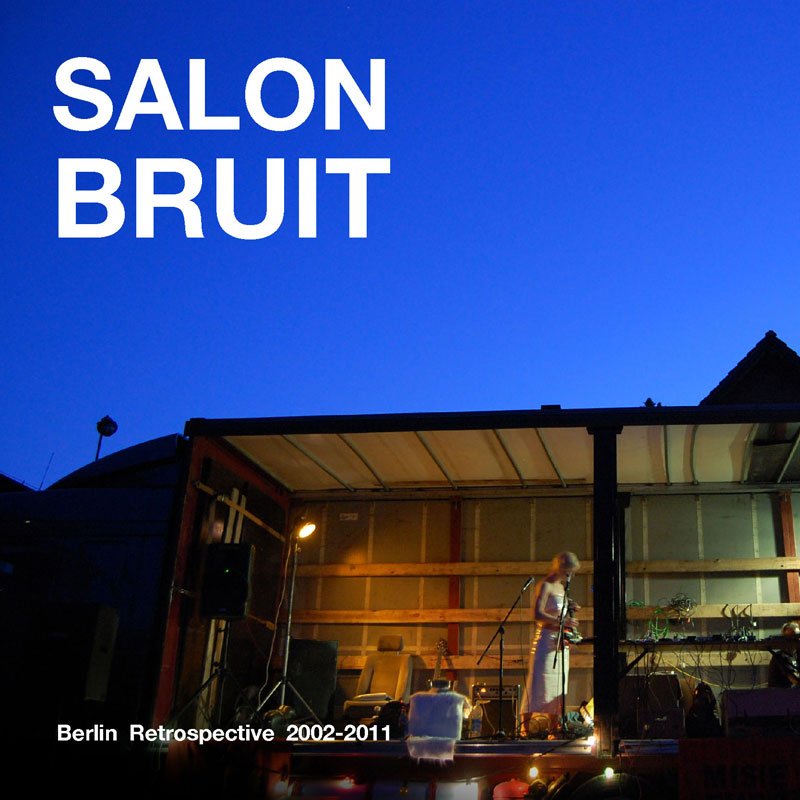

April 2011.[ar023] Live at Madame Claude, Experimontag, on 21 February 2011. Audition Records presented a new collaboration with Salon Bruit Berlin Retrospective 2002-2011
. A promotional compilation of Salon Bruit archives curated by Séamus O´Donnell & Julian Bonequi. With recordings around 2002–2011 with the next artists involved: Angie Yeowell (US), Circuit Parallele (FR), Gail Priest (AUS) & Mangrove Kipling (FR), Hassan Khan (EG), Thea Farhadian (US), Steffan de Turck (NL), Jeff Gburek (US) & Rinus van Alebeek (NL), The Quiet Club (IE), AntenA & David Vrbik (CZ), Tetsuya Hori (JP), Fake Mistress (DE), Ostear (IE), Sciolist (IE), Bob Rutman (DE), Preslav Literary School (UK), Hilot Lilanth (DE) and Evolution Control Committee (US), DeeMeeTree (RU), HANY (DE)- Nicholas Young & Harry Ansorge, Kyynan Tan & Matchees (AUS), Lifeloop, Stoerfan Sender, Fake Mistress & Dr.Nexus, and Mahmoud Refat (EG)

May 2011. Audition Records met Hannes Lingens in Velak Gala series in February in Vienna. They decided to make a Umlaut Records promotional compilation. [ar025] Umlaut Records Transformation of Sound 2004-2011. This compilation includes the works of Peeping Tom (Pierre-Antoine Badaroux, Joel Grip & Antonin Gerbal taken from "File Under: Bebop"), Donkey Monkey ( Eve Risser & Yuko Oshima, taken from "Hanakana" ), r.mutt ( Pierre-Antoine Badaroux, Sébastien Beliah & Antonin Gerbal, taken from "#03", Hannes Lingens - taken from "split 7-inch, OBLIQ & Christof Kurzmann - live at Umlaut Festival pt. 2 (edit) (Pierre Borel/Derek Shirley/Hannes Lingens/Christof Kurzmann taken from "split LP", Eve Risser/Joris Rühl - live at festival piednu taken from "split LP", Florian Bergmann with Antonio Borghini taken from "Rendez-Vous", and the last track is from Je Suis! - Eyafjallajökull (Niklas Barnö, trumpet / Mats Äleklint, trombone /Marcelo Gabard Pazos, saxes /Alexander Zethson, piano / Joel Grip, double bass / Magnus Vikberg, drums, taken from "Mistluren". Then Audition presented the first collaboration with musicians from Argentina. [ar026] Agustí Fernández, Pablo Ledesma, Mono Hurtado. A recording from Buenos Aires made in 2000. The third document of May is [ar027] Pandillismo Live at Hurta Cordel 2010. Live in Madrid in la Casa Encendida, and an excerpt of the concert in Barcelona at Espai Cultural in February 2010. A Mexican quartet with Rogelio Sosa, the curator and director of Radar, and festival Aural in Mexico City, Mario de Vega, Juan Pablo Villa and Julian Bonequi

In June 2011 Audition presents four documents: [ar028] Paul Hession 40 years of a drummer. A promotional documentary compilation of the drummer born in Leeds in 1956, performing with Joe McPhee on saxophone; Mick Beck, tenor saxophone; Simon Fell, double bass, and Ewan Stefani, electroacoustic manipulation. [ar029]Llorenç Barber. Retrospective 1994-2001., including an article written by Chema Chacón from Oro Molido Fanzine, named Llorenç Barber in his own words. The third document was a live performance of [ar030]Leonel Kaplan with Diego Chamy, Ivar Grydeland and Axel Dörner presenting recordings done in France and Chile across a two-month period way back in 2004. And another live performance this time of [ar031]Kim Myhr, Burkhard Beins, Kari Ronnekleiv and Nils Ostendrof at Ringve Museum. Trondheim 2011

== See also ==
- List of record labels
