= Blowup =

1966 film by Michelangelo Antonioni

- Theatrical release poster
- Directed by: Michelangelo Antonioni
- Screenplay by: Michelangelo Antonioni; Tonino Guerra
- Dialogue by: Edward Bond
- Story by: Michelangelo Antonioni
- Based on: "Las babas del diablo" by Julio Cortázar
- Produced by: Carlo Ponti
- Starring: Vanessa Redgrave; David Hemmings; Sarah Miles
- Cinematography: Carlo Di Palma
- Edited by: Frank Clarke
- Music by: Herbie Hancock; The Yardbirds
- Production companies: Metro-Goldwyn-Mayer; Carlo Ponti Productions; Bridge Films
- Distributed by: Premier Productions (United States); Metro-Goldwyn-Mayer (worldwide)
- Release dates: 18 December 1966 (United States); 16 March 1967 (United Kingdom); 27 September 1967 (Italy)
- Running time: 111 minutes
- Countries: United Kingdom; Italy
- Language: English
- Budget: $1.8 million
- Box office: $20 million

Blowup (also styled Blow-Up) is a 1966 psychological mystery film directed by Michelangelo Antonioni, co-written by Antonioni, Tonino Guerra and Edward Bond and produced by Carlo Ponti. It is Antonioni's first entirely English-language film and stars David Hemmings, Vanessa Redgrave and Sarah Miles. Model Veruschka von Lehndorff is featured as herself, and Jane Birkin makes her first film appearance. The film's non-diegetic music was scored by American jazz pianist Herbie Hancock, and the English rock group The Yardbirds are seen performing "Stroll On". The cinematographer was Carlo di Palma.

The plot was inspired by Argentine writer Julio Cortázar's 1958 short story "Las babas del diablo", which was later retitled "Blow-Up" to tie in with the film. Set within the contemporary mod subculture of Swinging London, the film follows a fashion photographer (Hemmings) who believes he has unwittingly captured a murder on film.

In the main competition of the 1967 Cannes Film Festival, Blowup won the Palme d'Or, the festival's highest honour. The American release of the counterculture-era film with its explicit sexual content defied Hollywood's Production Code, and its subsequent critical and commercial success influenced the abandonment of the code in 1968 in favour of the MPAA film rating system. At the 39th Academy Awards, the film was nominated for Best Director and Best Original Screenplay. The film was also nominated for three BAFTA Awards, including Outstanding British Film.

Blowup has influenced subsequent films including Francis Ford Coppola's The Conversation (1974) and Brian De Palma's Blow Out (1981). It was also an inspiration for the Indian movie Jaane Bhi Do Yaaro (1983). In 2012, it was ranked No. 144 in the Sight and Sound critics' poll of the greatest films of all time and No. 59 in the directors' poll.

== Plot ==
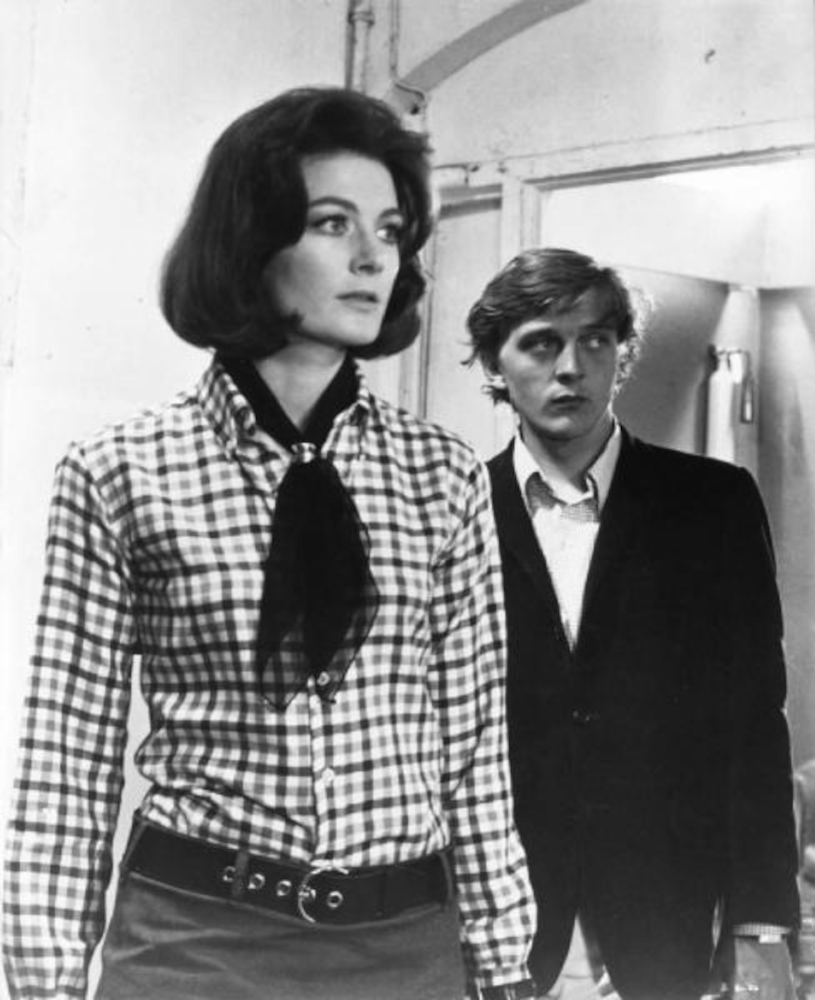
Vanessa Redgrave and David Hemmings 1966

After spending the night at a doss house, where he has taken pictures for a book of art photographs, photographer Thomas is late for a photo shoot with model Veruschka at his studio, which in turn makes him late for a shoot with other models later in the morning. He grows bored and frustrated with the models and walks off, leaving them and the production staff in the lurch. As he leaves the studio, two teenage aspiring models ask to speak to him, but he brushes them off and drives off to visit an antique shop near Maryon Park.

Wandering into the park, Thomas furtively takes photographs of two lovers, an older man in his 60s and a lady in her 30s. He follows them in a secluded area in the park. Then, he leaves, but the woman, Jane, is furious at being photographed and pursues Thomas, demanding his film and attempting to take his camera. He refuses, and continues to photograph her as she runs away. Thomas then meets his agent Ron for lunch and notices a man following him and looking into his car. Thomas returns to his studio to find Jane, who asks desperately for the film. They have a conversation and flirt, but he deliberately hands her a different roll of film. She, in turn, gives him a false telephone number.

Thomas makes several blow-ups of the film of Jane and her lover, which reveal Jane appearing to look worriedly at a person lurking in the trees with a pistol. Thomas returns to the darkroom to blow up the photograph repeatedly, until the coarsening grain suggests a body lying in the undergrowth. Thomas excitedly calls Ron, claiming that his impromptu photo session may have saved a man's life. He is then disturbed by a knock on the door from the teenage girls. They have a sexual encounter in the studio before he falls asleep. After awakening, he learns that the girls hope he will photograph them, but is distracted by a detail in one of his blow-ups. He tells them to leave, saying, "Tomorrow! Tomorrow!"

Thomas examines a blurred figure on the ground under a bush in the blow-up, which he suspects is the dead body of a man shot by the gunman. As evening falls, he goes back to the park without his camera and finds the body, but is scared off by the sound of a twig breaking. He returns to his studio to find it ransacked, with all of the negatives and prints gone except for one very grainy blow-up of what is possibly the body.

After driving into town, he sees Jane and follows her into the Ricky-Tick club, where the Yardbirds are performing the song "Stroll On". A buzzing noise in guitarist Jeff Beck's amplifier angers him so much that he smashes his guitar and throws its neck into the crowd. The crowd, previously disengaged, fights over the guitar neck. Thomas grabs the neck and runs out of the club, with much of the crowd chasing after him; once he is away from the crowd, he tosses the neck away and walks on. A passer-by picks up the neck and examines it, but also discards it.

At a drug-drenched party in a house on the Thames, Thomas asks a cannabis-addled Ron to come to the park as a witness, but cannot convince him of what has happened. Instead, Thomas joins the party at Ron's insistence and wakes up in the house at sunrise. He then returns to the park alone, only to find that the body is gone.

Thomas watches a mime troupe perform a mock-tennis match at the park, and picks up the imaginary ball and throws it back to the two players when asked. As he watches the mimes continue to play, the sound of the ball being played is heard. His image then fades away, leaving only the grass.

== Cast ==
- David Hemmings as Thomas
- Vanessa Redgrave as Jane
- Sarah Miles as Patricia, Thomas's next-door neighbour
- John Castle as Bill, abstract artist and husband of Patricia
- Jane Birkin as blonde girl
- Gillian Hills as brunette girl
- Peter Bowles as Ron, Thomas's agent
- Veruschka von Lehndorff as herself
- Julian and Claude Chagrin as mimes

Uncredited members of the cast include Ronan O'Casey as Jane’s lover/victim in park, Susan Brodrick as the antiquarian, and Tsai Chin as Thomas's receptionist. Jill Kennington, Peggy Moffitt and Donyale Luna appear as Thomas' models. The Yardbirds (Jeff Beck, Jimmy Page, Chris Dreja, Jim McCarty, and Keith Relf) appear as themselves.

Piers Gough and Janet Street-Porter appear as uncredited extras in the nightclub sequence. Julio Cortázar, the author of the source short story, makes a cameo appearance as a homeless man. Real-life photographer Reg Wilkins, who was one of the inspirations for Thomas' character, appears as his assistant.

== Themes ==
Antonioni's screenplay for Blowup is a "thriller-suspense" story revolving around the efforts of a young and successful fashion photographer in his struggle to determine whether a series of photographs he takes at a public park contain evidence of a murder. As Thomas persists, his quest leads him initially to question his technical mastery over the "hidden truth" recorded by his camera, then toward a confrontation with the realities of his life of "material advantages, gained at the expense of ideals". Finally, he questions the reality of his own existence. Film historian Gordon Gow identifies the object in Antonioni's use of suspense:

In the case of Blow-up, the mystery [i.e. whether a murder took place] is relevant to the film, but the solution of it is not. Indeed, the absence of a solution is part of the point: life's uncertainty ... the true suspense resides not in the mystery of the photographic blow-ups, but in the instability of Thomas himself.

In an interview at the time of the film's release, Antonioni stated that the film "is not about man's relationship with man, it is about man's relationship with reality". According to Gow, "a mystery without a solution is instrumental to the theme of disorientation" which is sustained until the final moments of the film, in which Thomas fails to resolve the contradictions and ambiguities that arise from his investigations and his own life. Thomas' fate is known and the audience's suspense is resolved, but Antonioni leaves the meaning of the film open to speculation.

Gow considers two interpretations for the ending:

Since Blow-Up is not resolved happily, but rather in a total surrender to fantasy and consequently to oblivion, we can take it either as an exhortation to come to terms with reality, or as a cautionary tale in which the pursuit of material gain is a threat to humanity.

== Production ==
=== Inspirations and influences ===
The plot of Blowup was inspired by Argentine writer Julio Cortázar's 1959 short story "Las babas del diablo", collected in End of the Game and Other Stories, which in turn was based on a story told to Cortázar by photographer Sergio Larraín. The short story was subsequently retitled "Blow-up" to connect it with the film. The life of Swinging London photographer David Bailey was also an influence on the plot.

=== Casting ===
Several people were offered the role of the protagonist, including Sean Connery (who declined when Antonioni refused to show him the script), David Bailey, and Terence Stamp, who was replaced shortly before filming began after Antonioni saw David Hemmings in a stage production of Dylan Thomas' Adventures in the Skin Trade.

Jane Birkin made her film debut as the blonde girl.

=== Filming ===
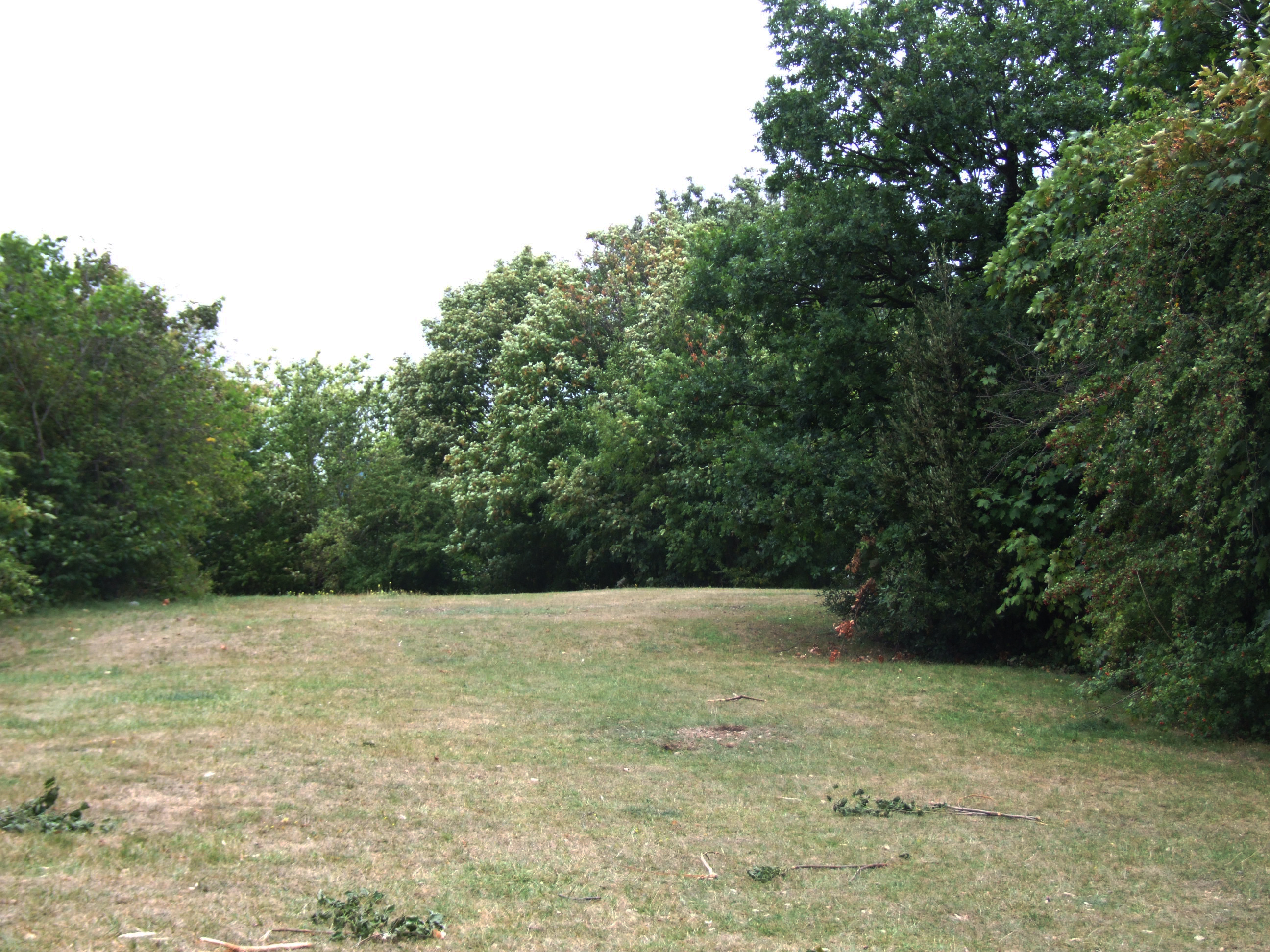
Maryon Park

Most of Blowup was shot on location throughout London. The film's opening scene was filmed on the Plaza of The Economist Building in St. James's Street, Westminster, a project by 'New Brutalist' architects Alison and Peter Smithson that was constructed between 1959 and 1964. The park scenes were filmed at Maryon Park in Charlton; the park has changed little since the film was shot, although Antonioni painted the grass green to meet his requirements. Photographer John Cowan leased his studio at 39 Princes Place in Notting Hill to Antonioni for much of the interior and exterior filming, and Cowan's own photographic murals are featured in the film. Other locations included Heddon Street (where the cover of David Bowie's album The Rise and Fall of Ziggy Stardust and the Spiders from Mars would later be photographed) and Cheyne Walk in Chelsea.

The scene in which the Yardbirds perform "Stroll On" – a modified version of "Train Kept A-Rollin'" with new lyrics – was filmed in a replica of the Ricky-Tick club at Elstree Studios in Borehamwood, Hertfordshire from 12 to 14 October 1966. Janet Street-Porter appears in the scene as an extra.

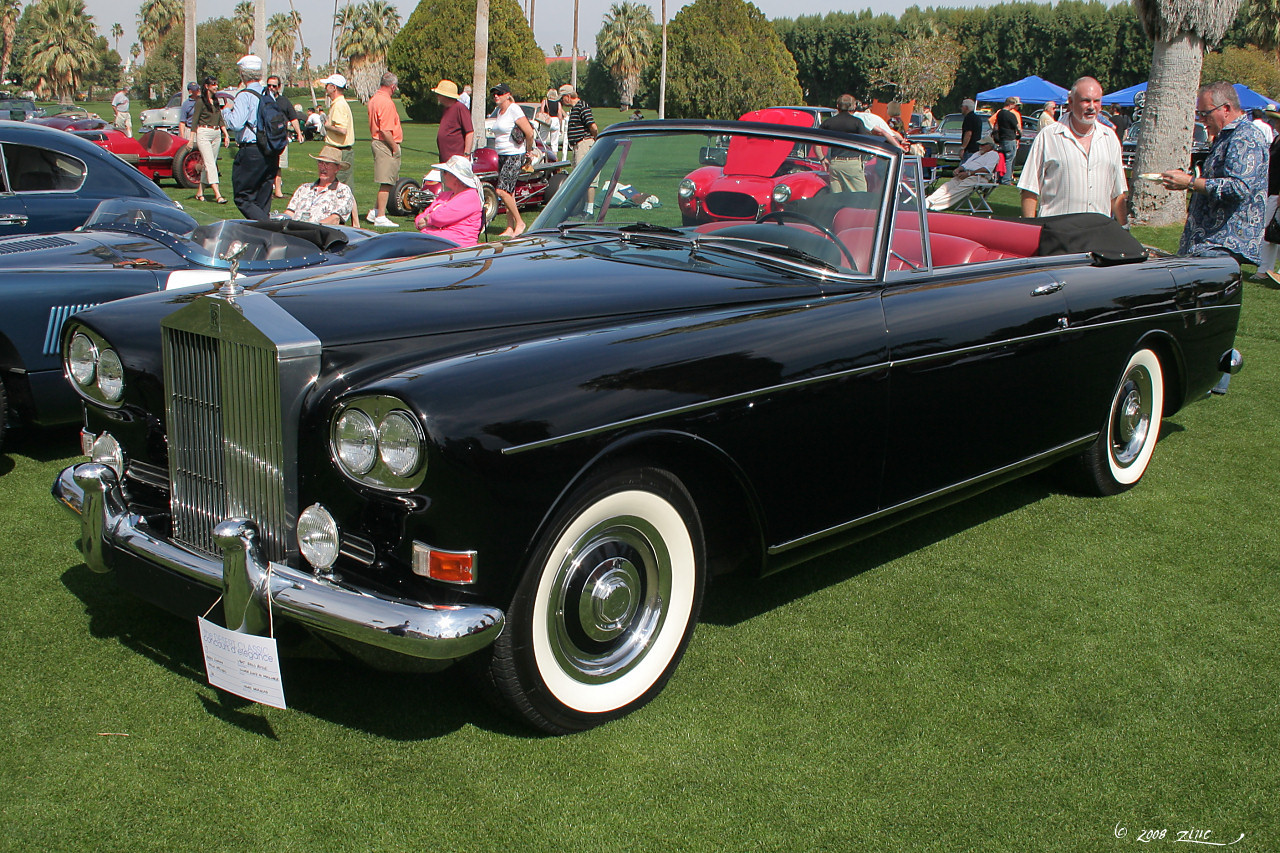
An example of a rare 'Chinese Eye' Silver Cloud III DHC as used in the film

Actor Ronan O'Casey claimed that the film's mysterious nature is the product of an "unfinished" production. In a 1999 letter to Roger Ebert, O'Casey wrote that scenes that would have "depict[ed] the planning of the murder and its aftermath – scenes with Vanessa, Sarah Miles, and Jeremy Glover, Vanessa's new young lover who plots with her to murder me – were never shot because the film went seriously over budget." O'Casey had previously told this story to Der Spiegel in 1967, where he stated that Dyson Lovell played the part of the murderous lover. Two scenes appear to give credence to this: first when Lovell is seen apparently tampering with Thomas' car, and later when he and Jane are seen following Thomas in a Rover 2000.

=== Thomas' car ===
Thomas drives a Rolls-Royce Silver Cloud III 'Chinese Eye' Mulliner Park Ward Drophead Coupé owned by DJ and television presenter Jimmy Savile. The car was originally painted white, then painted black by the production. Only about one hundred coach built Silver Clouds IIIs were made with the unique slanted headlights, and it remains an iconic element of the film.

== Release and reception ==
Blowup premiered at the Coronet Theater on Third Avenue in New York City on 18 December 1966.

MGM did not gain approval for the film under the MPAA's Production Code in the United States. The film was condemned by the National Legion of Decency. MGM released the film through a subsidiary distributor, Premier Productions, and it was shown widely in North American cinemas. The film's critical and commercial success played a major role in the abolition of the Production Code and its replacement with the MPAA rating system shortly thereafter.

=== Box office ===
Film writer Richard Corliss stated in 2007 that the film grossed $20 million (about $147 million in 2025) on a $1.8 million budget and "helped liberate Hollywood from its puritanical prurience" in the process.

The film earned $5.9 million (about $43.4 million in 2025) in the United States and Canada in 1967.

=== Critical reception ===
Critic Andrew Sarris called the film "a mod masterpiece.” In Playboy magazine, film critic Arthur Knight wrote that Blowup would come to be considered "as important and seminal a film as Citizen Kane, Open City, and Hiroshima, Mon Amour – perhaps even more so". Time magazine called the film a "far-out, uptight and vibrantly exciting picture" that represented a "screeching change of creative direction" for Antonioni; the magazine predicted it would "undoubtedly be by far the most popular movie Antonioni has ever made".

Conversely, Pauline Kael found Blowup to be vague and vacuously symbolic. She argued that these aspects led audiences to find the film artistic and intellectual. In that regard, she likened it to Last Year at Marienbad.

Bosley Crowther, film critic of The New York Times, called it a "fascinating picture", but expressed reservations, describing the "usual Antonioni passages of seemingly endless wanderings" as "redundant and long"; nevertheless, he called Blowup a "stunning picture – beautifully built up with glowing images and color compositions that get us into the feelings of our man and into the characteristics of the mod world in which he dwells". Even director Ingmar Bergman, who generally disliked Antonioni's work, called the film a masterpiece.

The conscience of Thomas in Blow-Up is not troubled by any sense of obligation or responsibility to the girl [Vanessa Redgrave as Jane] he has photographed in the park. Human relationships do not go very deep with Thomas. Selfish and self-tormented, he draws what confidence he can from the mastery he has over his camera. Yet his blow-ups of the pictures from the park disclose that the camera has possibly functioned independently [of him], in the sense that there is more in the photographs than Thomas realized when he took them. Thus his mastery is called into question.

— Film historian Gordon Gow, Suspense in the Cinema (1968)

Anthony Quinn, writing for The Guardian in 2017 for the film's fiftieth anniversary, described Blowup as "a picture about perception and ambiguity", suggesting an association between elements of the film and the Zapruder film capturing the 1963 assassination of John F. Kennedy.

According to author Thomas Beltzer, the film explores the "inherently alienating" qualities of mass media, where "the camera has turned us into passive voyeurs, programmable for predictable responses, ultimately helpless and even inhumanly dead". Bilge Eberi of Houston Press notes the contrast between "the sinewy movements of the girls, their psychedelic jumpsuits and slinky dresses and multicolored minis", and "the blurred, frozen, inchoate unknowability of the death contained within [Thomas'] image", which "is a glimpse of the eternal and elemental ... that completely reorders, or rather disorders, Thomas's world. As an artist, he can't capture it or understand it or do anything with it. As an individual, he can't possess it or consume it."

Roger Ebert described the film as "a hypnotic conjuring act, in which a character is awakened briefly from a deep sleep of bored alienation and then drifts away again. This is the arc of the film. Not 'Swinging London.' Not existential mystery. Not the parallels between what Hemmings does with his photos and what Antonioni does with Hemmings. But simply the observations that we are happy when we are doing what we do well, and unhappy seeking pleasure elsewhere. I imagine Antonioni was happy when he was making this film."

In his commentary for the DVD edition of the film, Peter Brunette connects it to the existentialist tenet that actions and experiences have no inherent meaning, but are given a meaning within a particular context. According to Brunette, this is demonstrated by the scene in which Thomas takes Jeff Beck's guitar neck out onto the street: "He's rescued the object, this intensely meaningful object. Yet, out of the context, it's just a broken piece of a guitar [...] the important point here being that meaning, and the construction we put on reality, is always a group social function. And it's contextual."

On the review aggregator website Rotten Tomatoes, the film holds an 87% approval rating based on 54 reviews from film critics, with an average rating of 8.3/10. On Metacritic, the film has a weighted average score of 82 out of 100, based on reviews from 15 critics.

American director Martin Scorsese included Blowup on his list of "39 Essential Foreign Films for a Young Filmmaker".

Films such as The Conversation, Deep Red, Blow Out, Jaane Bhi Do Yaaro and Enemy of the State have been inspired by Blowup.

=== Awards and honours ===
Institution	Year	Category	Recipient(s)	Result	Ref(s)
Academy Awards	1967	Best Director	Michelangelo Antonioni	Nominated	
Academy Awards	1967	Best Original Screenplay	Michelangelo Antonioni, Tonino Guerra, Edward Bond	Nominated	
British Academy Film Awards	1968	Best British Film	Michelangelo Antonioni	Nominated	
British Academy Film Awards	1968	Best Cinematography, Colour	Carlo Di Palma	Nominated	
British Academy Film Awards	1968	Best Art Direction, Colour	Assheton Gorton	Nominated	
Cannes Film Festival	1967	Grand Prix du Festival International du Film	Michelangelo Antonioni	Won	
French Syndicate of Cinema Critics	1968	Best Foreign Film	Michelangelo Antonioni	Won	
Golden Globes	1967	Best English-Language Foreign Film	Blowup	Nominated	
Nastro d'Argento	1968	Best Foreign Director	Michelangelo Antonioni	Won	
National Society of Film Critics	1967	Best Film	Blowup	Won	
National Society of Film Critics	1967	Best Director	Michelangelo Antonioni	Won	

=== Home media release ===
Warner Home Video released a Region 1 DVD of the film in 2004. In 2017, the Criterion Collection issued the film on Blu-ray and DVD, featuring a 4K remaster from the original camera negatives, in addition to new bonus materials.

== See also ==
- Michelangelo Antonioni filmography
- 1966 in film
- BFI Top 100 British films
- Blow Out
- Blow-Up (soundtrack)
- List of cult films
- List of films featuring surveillance
- Mod (subculture)
- Swinging Sixties

== Notes ==
1. Several people known in 1966 are in the film; others became famous later. The most widely noted cameo was by The Yardbirds who perform "Stroll On" in the last third. Michelangelo Antonioni first asked Eric Burdon to play that scene, but he turned it down. In an interview Sterling Morrison of The Velvet Underground claimed that Antonioni had also asked the Velvet Underground to appear in the film, and the band members were "more than willing", but due to the expense of flying the Velvets over from the US, Antonioni instead decided on an English group. As Keith Relf sings, Jimmy Page and Jeff Beck play to either side along with Chris Dreja and Jim McCarty.
2. After Jeff Beck's guitar amplifier fails, he bashes his guitar to bits as The Who did at the time. Michelangelo Antonioni had wanted The Who in Blowup as he was fascinated by Pete Townshend's guitar-smashing routine.
3. Steve Howe of Tomorrow recalled and wrote "We went on the set and started preparing for that guitar-smashing scene in the club. They even went as far as making up a bunch of Gibson 175 replicas and then we got dropped for The Yardbirds who were a bigger name. That's why you see Jeff Beck smashing my guitar rather than his!"
4. Janet Street-Porter can be seen dancing in a silver coat and red and yellow striped Carnaby Street trousers during the scene inside the nightclub. A pre-Monty Python Michael Palin can also be seen in the motionless crowd watching The Yardbirds.
