= Blow-Up (short story) =

- Short story by Julio Cortázar
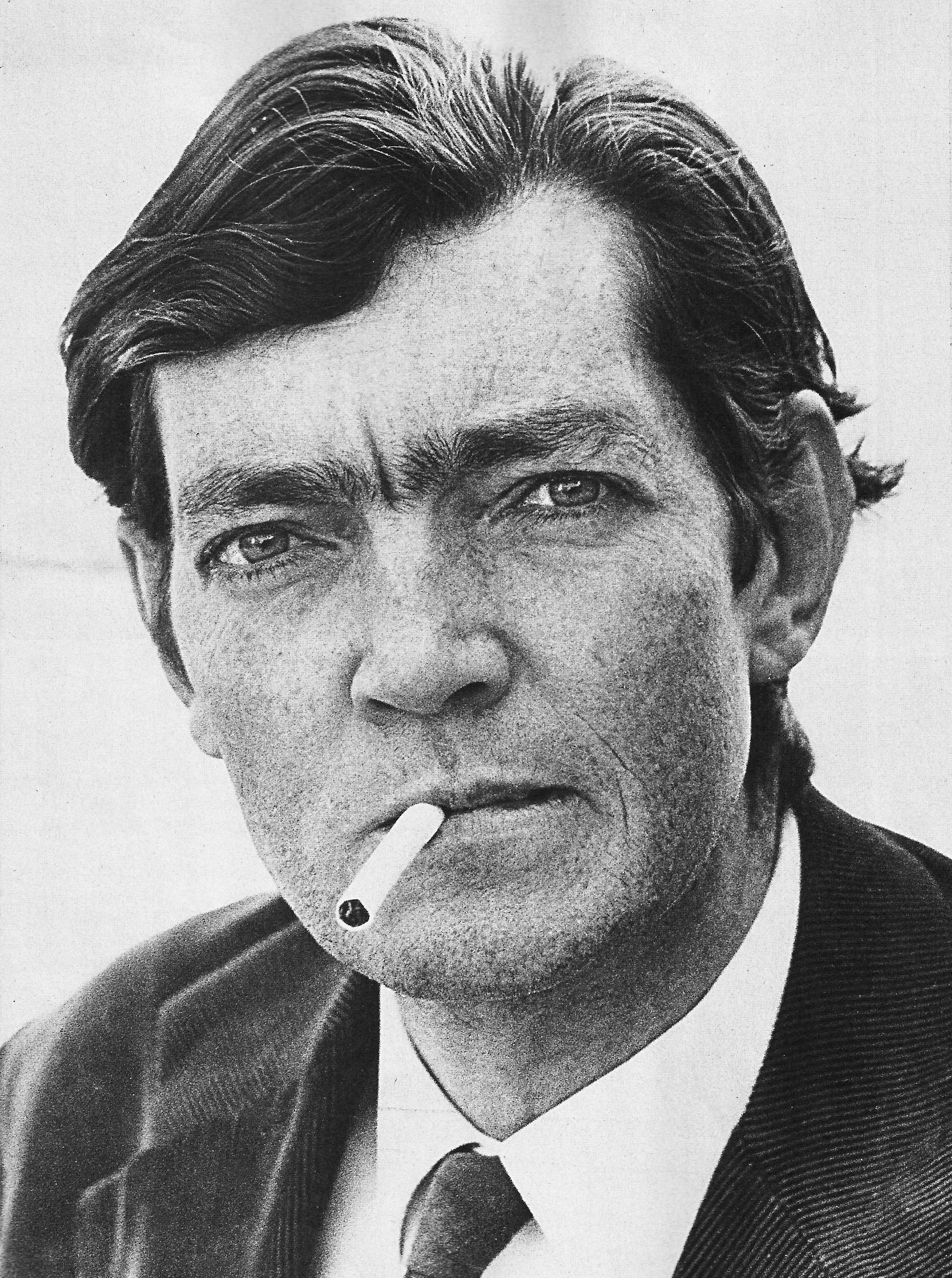

Publication
- Publisher: Editorial Sudamericana
- Publication date: 1958

"Blow-Up" (Spanish: "Las babas del diablo") is a work of short fiction by Julio Cortázar first collected in Las Armas secretas (1958) by publisher Editorial Sudamericana

The story was written during a highly prolific period in Cortázar’s literary career during which he wrote stories published in three volumes.

The adaptation to film of the story by director Michelangelo Antonioni in 1966 contributed to Cortázar’s international reputation as a writer.

The original Spanish title for the story translates literally as "The Droolings of the Devil", which is the colloquial name given in Argentina to condensed spider silk filaments floating in the air or clinging to plants, wires, and buildings.

== Plot ==
“No one can recount one of Cortázar’s plots; each text has a certain number of words and precise order. If we try to summarize it, something precious gets lost.”—Jorge Luis Borges, “Julio Cortázar: Cuentos, Biblioteca personal” (1984).

“Blow-Up” ("Las babas del diablo”) is told from several points-of-view and tenses and shifting perspectives. The focal character is Roberto Michel, a French-Chilean translator and amateur photographer who lives in Paris. His activities and thoughts are related through both first-person and third-person narratives.

The story is set in Paris at the Île Saint-Louis, a popular urban island in early November. Michel is wandering about with his camera. He perches on a retaining wall and to observe what he at first thinks is “a kid and his mother.” On a second glance he finds the couple intriguing and vaguely sinister: an attractive woman is speaking ardently to an adolescent boy. The nature of their relationship is unclear, but Michel imagines them making love in her apartment. The boy seems agitated at the woman’s controlling presence. On impulse, Michel raises the camera and takes a photo. The image encompasses the couple and the surrounding landscape, including a man sitting in an automobile across the street. The woman instantly reprimands Michel for his intrusion and demands he hand over the film; Michel protests and declines to do so. During the contretemps the boy quickly retreats and disappears. The man emerges from the car and silently approaches Michel, his face twisted into an enraged grimace.

Michel returns home and develops the film, enlarging the image to the size of a poster. Regarding the image of the trio, Michel feels gratified at having provided for the boy’s escape from an assignation with the man.

== Narrative form ==
Cortázar opens “Blow-Up” with a brief discourse on his struggle to select the tense and the point-of-view from which the story will be narrated.

It’ll never be known how this has to be told, in the first person or in the second, using the third person plural or continually inventing modes that will serve for nothing. If one might say: I will see the moon rose, or; we hurt me at the back of my eyes, and especially: you the blond woman was the clouds that race before my your his our yours their face, What the hell!

As such, the story is notable for its multiple narrative perspectives that alternate abruptly “from present to past to future” and from the first-person “I” to the third-person “he.”

=== Similarities in Cortázar’s plot and Antonioni’s movie adaptation ===
“As is obvious in Antonioni’s choice of it as a pretext for his film of the same name, “Blow-Up” is Cortázar’s most ambitious and complex excursion into Borgesian notions of relativity.”—Critic John Ditski in End of the Game: The Early Fictions of Julio Cortázar (1983)

According to novelist and critic Ilan Stavans, Cortázar’s “Blow-Up” is multifaceted in its themes, providing “a document of photography as an art and weapon, a study of morality in today’s society, and an experiment with multiple ways of telling a plot.”

The narrator in Cortázar’s story Michel, suspects an illicit sexual arrangement is underway after examining the photo enlargements; perhaps they reveal the enlistment of a fourteen- or fifteen-year-old boy in a homosexual act an the elderly gentleman, facilitated by an accomplice - a middle-aged prostitute.

Antonioni adopted the same array of themes, but inserted a possible murder as central to the narrative, while suggesting only underage heterosexuality.

As to whether a crime has been committed is never made perfectly clear, neither in the short story nor the film adaptation. Both share “shifting narrative perspectives.” which confirm Cortázar’s declaration that the precise circumstances of the events “will never be known.”

== Sources ==
- Cortázar, Julio. 1985. Blow-Up and Other Stories. Pantheon Books, New York. ISBN 0-394-72881-5 (paperback)
- Ditski, John. 1983. End of the Game: The Early Fictions of Julio Cortázar. Review of Contemporary Fiction 3, no. 3, (Fall 1983) (pp. 38-44) from Julio Cortázar: A Study of the Short Fiction. 1996. pp. 110-123. Twayne’s Studies in Short Fiction, Gordon Weaver, general editor. Twayne Publishers, New York. ISBN 0-8057-8293-1
- Stavans, Ilan. 1996. Julio Cortázar: A Study of the Short Fiction. Twayne’s Studies in Short Fiction, Gordon Weaver, general editor. Twayne Publishers, New York. ISBN 0-8057-8293-1
