= Bestiario =

Short story collection by Julio Cortázar

- First edition
- Author: Julio Cortázar
- Language: Spanish
- Genre: Short story collection
- Publisher: Sudamericana
- Publication date: 1951
- Publication place: Argentina
- Media type: Print
- Pages: 165

Bestiario (Spanish for 'Bestiary') (1951) is an Argentinean collection of eight short stories written by Julio Cortázar.

His first volume of short fiction, all the stories (except for "Cefalea," "Omnibus," and "Circe") were translated into English by Paul Blackburn and included in End of the Game and Other Stories (1963). The collection was reprinted by Vintage Press in 1967.

"Cefalea" ("Headache") was translated into English by Michael Cisco in 2014 and published online in Reactor Magazine. "Omnibus" and "Circe" were translated by Alberto Manguel and appear in Bestiary: The Selected Stories of Julio Cortázar (2020).

== Stories ==
- "Casa Tomada" ("House Taken Over")
- "Carta a una señorita en París" ("Letter to a Young Lady in Paris")
- "Lejana" ("The Distances")
- "Ómnibus" ("Omnibus")
- "Cefalea" ("Headache"): A group of ranchers are raising a herd of mancuspias (strange chimerical creatures that have the characteristics of chickens, sheep, and other farm animals, yet are completely distinct from all of them). Isolated on their farm from the nearby townsfolk who fear catching diseases from the animals, the ranchers themselves have become hypochondriacs and are constantly taking different medicines to protect themselves against numerous mental and physical ailments. When two of the farm's laborers abscond with the only horse, the ranchers are left to care for the strange animals by themselves. The mancuspias slowly become ill and begin to die, howling in pain as they surround the house the ranchers have been forced to take refuge in.
- "Circe" ("Circe")
- "Las puertas del cielo" ("The Gates of Heaven")
- "Bestiario" ("Bestiary")

== Retrospective appraisal ==
Novelist and critic Ilan Stavans reports that reception of Bestiario was "rather poor" but underwent a positive reassessment in the 1960s. The collection "contains the seed of everything Cortázar would ever create…"

Almost all the short stories that I have written belong to the genre called fantastic...they oppose the false realism that consists in believing all things can be described and explained according to the philosophical and scientific optimism of the eighteenth century; that is, as part of a world ruled more or less harmoniously by a system of laws or principles, of cause and effect relationships or defined psychologies, of well-mapped geographies.

== Sources ==
- Stavans, Ilan. 1996. Julio Cortázar: A Study of the Short Fiction. Twayne’s Studies in Short Fiction, Gordon Weaver, general editor. Twayne Publishers, New York. ISBN 0-8057-8293-1
