= Ricky-Tick =

English rhythm & blues club

Coordinates: 51.485°N 0.61°W

The Ricky-Tick was an influential 1960s rhythm & blues club in Windsor, Berkshire, England, host to many important acts such as The Rolling Stones, The Who, The Jimi Hendrix Experience, Pink Floyd and Cream. It was set up as an R&B venue after founders Philip Hayward and John Mansfield saw the success in early 1962 of the Ealing Club. At the close of the Ricky-Tick Philip Hayward went on to open Pantiles Club & Restaurant in Bagshot, Surrey.

The club was resident at several Windsor locations over its lifespan, and in later days included clubs in Guildford, Hounslow, Reading and High Wycombe, but its most famous venue was the Windsor river-side mansion at Clewer Mead.

Gigs were also organized at the Drill Hall at Maidenhead in 1963, and hosted bands like Yardbirds, The Pretty Things and the Stones. The original venue for the Ricky-Tick was an upstairs room behind the Star and Garter pub. It then moved to another pub called the Thames Hotel, not in Peascod Street, Windsor but down on the Thamesriver front, before moving to Clewer Manor. Sunday nights saw the Disco-Tick evenings with Fridays and Saturdays devoted to live bands. Geno Washington & The Ram Jam Band were regulars as were Georgie Fame and the Blue Flames, The Alan Price Set, Hogsnort Rupert and the Good Good Band and others including Herbie Goins, John Mayall, and Zoot Money. The Ricky-Tick also helped introduce Motown to the UK with The Supremes, Temptations, and Stevie Wonder all appearing. There was also an in-house "Boutick" where patrons could buy shirts and other clothes of the day.

== Pop culture ==
An Elstree Studios mock-up of the Ricky-Tick was meant to be the club where the Yardbirds are playing "Stroll On" while Thomas (David Hemmings) looks for Jane (Vanessa Redgrave) in Antonioni's film Blowup (1966).

David Bowie makes reference to the club on the sleeve notes of Pin Ups, his album of 1960s rock covers.

== Other uses of the phrase ==
"Ricky-tick" can also express quickness in the way something might be accomplished, as in "This needs to get done most ricky-tick." The term is used often in US military and law enforcement. The phrase in this context was first used in the US Marine Corps, but its origin is disputed: either derived from the Japanese phrase "riki-tik"[?there is no such phrase and 'tik' does not exist in Japanese], or from Rudyard Kipling's Jungle Book short story Rikki-Tikki-Tavi, in which the titular character is a quick, snake-slaying mongoose.

According to Merriam-Webster, it means "sweet jazz of a style reminiscent of the 1920s". Jazz musician Max Kaminsky used the term to refer to the rhythmic style of "choppy syncopation" in ragtime music.
