= Original Sin (2001 film) =

2001 romantic drama film by Michael Cristofer

- Theatrical release poster
- Directed by: Michael Cristofer
- Screenplay by: Michael Cristofer
- Based on: Waltz into Darkness by Cornell Woolrich
- Produced by: Denise Di Novi; Kate Guinzberg; Carol Lees
- Starring: Antonio Banderas; Angelina Jolie; Thomas Jane; Jack Thompson
- Cinematography: Rodrigo Prieto
- Edited by: Eric A. Sears
- Music by: Terence Blanchard
- Production companies: Metro-Goldwyn-Mayer Pictures; Hyde Park Entertainment; Via Rosa Productions
- Distributed by: MGM Distribution Co. (United States and Canada); 20th Century Fox (Overseas)
- Release dates: July 11, 2001 (France); August 3, 2001 (United States)
- Running time: 116 minutes
- Countries: United Kingdom; France; Mexico; United States
- Language: English
- Budget: $26-42 million
- Box office: $35.4 million

Original Sin is a 2001 American erotic romantic thriller film written and directed by Michael Cristofer and starring Antonio Banderas and Angelina Jolie. It is based on the 1947 novel Waltz into Darkness by Cornell Woolrich, which was previously made into the 1969 François Truffaut film Mississippi Mermaid. The film was produced by actress Michelle Pfeiffer's production company, Via Rosa Productions.

== Plot ==
Original Sin is set in late 19th century Cuba during the Spanish rule, and flashes back and forth from the scene of a woman awaiting her execution while telling her story to a priest to the actual events of that story.

Luis Vargas, a Cuban man, sends for American Julia Russell from Delaware to be his mail-order bride. Julia comes off the ship, looking nothing like her photos. She explains she wants more than a man who is only interested in a pretty face, so she substituted a plain-looking woman's photo. Luis also admits to deception; he has misled her into believing he is a poor clerk instead of a wealthy plantation owner. Julia says that they both have something in common: that both are not to be trusted. But they assure each other that they will try to understand and trust each other in life.

Luis and Julia wed in the church within hours of her setting foot in Cuba. Luis falls desperately in love with her and they have passionate sex. Meanwhile, Julia's sister Emily is worried. She sends an emotional letter asking about her welfare. Luis forces Julia to write back, fearing that if Julia continues to ignore Emily's letters, Emily will assume something terrible has befallen her sister, and she might send the authorities. Holding off as long as possible, Julia finally pens a letter to her sister.

Luis adds Julia to his business and personal bank accounts, giving her free rein to spend as she pleases. A detective, Walter Downs, arrives from Wilmington and tells Luis that he has been hired by Emily to find her sister Julia and would like to see her on the coming Sunday. Luis informs Julia about this, and she gets upset. Emily arrives in Cuba to meet Luis and shows the letter Julia wrote to her. She informs Luis that she believes Julia to be an impostor and that her sister may be dead. Luis discovers that Julia has taken nearly all of his fortune and teams up with Walter to look for her.

Luis finds Julia and discovers she is actually in league with Walter. Luis believes she loves him and lies to Walter, but when confronted, a fight breaks out, and Luis shoots Walter. Julia sends Luis to go and buy them tickets home, but it is a trick, and Walter is not dead. Julia appears to love Luis but fears Walter, so she and Luis run off to live secretly, with the supposedly dead Walter in pursuit. Walter turns out to be Bonny's old lover and partner, Billy. Billy makes a cut on Bonny's back before having sex with her, as he did during their previous encounters.

Luis throws away his promising future to be with Julia. One night, Luis follows Julia and discovers Billy is alive and that the two are still working together; she is apparently going to poison her husband that very night. He returns home to wait for her, and when she arrives, he reveals that he knows about the plan, confesses his love for her once more, and swallows the poisoned drink. Julia flees with the dying Luis, with Billy close behind. They run into him at a train station; Walter is furious that Julia has betrayed him. As Billy holds a knife to her throat, Luis shoots and wounds him, with Julia finishing him off.

Back in the mise en scene, Julia finishes her story and asks the priest to pray with her. The next morning the guards come to her cell to take her to her execution, only to find the priest kneeling in her clothing.

In Morocco, Julia is watching a card game. She walks around the table occupied by gamblers, including Luis, and thanks them for allowing her to watch. As Julia signals Luis about the other players' cards, he begins telling them the story of how they got there.

== Cast ==
- Antonio Banderas as Luis Antonio Vargas
- Angelina Jolie as Julia Russell/Bonny Castle
- Thomas Jane as Walter Downs/Billy/Mephisto
- Jack Thompson as Alan Jordan
- Gregory Itzin as Colonel Edwin Worth
- Pedro Armendáriz Jr. as Jorge Cortes
- James Haven as Faust
- Allison Mackie as Augusta Jordan
- Joan Pringle as Sara
- Cordelia Richards as Emilly Russell
- Mario Ivan Martinez as Cuban priest
- Harry Porter as stage manager
- Fernando Torre Lapham as wedding priest
- Shaula Vega as Dressmaker girl
- Lisa Owen as Margretta
- Daniel Martínez as Rafael
- Farnesio De Bernal as Bank clerk
- Nitzi Arellano as prostitute
- Roger Cudney as ship's captain
- Adrian Makala as ship's waiter
- Francis Laborial as ship's stewardess
- Derek Rojo as Bell boy
- Abraham Stavans as Mr. Gutierrez
- Julio Bracho as Guard

== Production ==
It was rumored that the chemistry between Jolie and Banderas led to a relationship, which they denied. The film had to be cut to achieve an R-rating, which director Michael Cristofer called censorship.

== Reception ==
=== Critical response ===
On Rotten Tomatoes the film has a 12% approval rating based on 91 reviews and an average rating of 3.40/10. The site's consensus states: "Laughably melodramatic, Original Sin features bad acting, poor dialogue and even worse plotting." On Metacritic, it has a score of 33 based on reviews from 24 critics, indicating generally unfavorable reviews. Audiences polled by CinemaScore gave the film an average grade of "C+" on an A+ to F scale.

Roger Ebert of the Chicago Sun-Times gave the movie a positive review, and said about Jolie's performance: "Jolie continues to stalk through pictures entirely on her own terms. Her presence is like a dare-ya for a man. There's dialogue in this movie so overwrought, it's almost literally unspeakable, and she survives it by biting it off contemptuously and spitting it out."

=== Accolades ===
Angelina Jolie was nominated for a Golden Raspberry Award for Worst Actress for her work in both this film and Lara Croft: Tomb Raider.
