= Abraham Stavans =

Mexican actor and theater director (1933–2019)

- Born: Abraham Stavchansky Altschuler; 1 January 1933; Mexico City, Mexico
- Died: 5 March 2019 (aged 86); Mexico City, Mexico
- Occupations: Actor and theater director
- Years active: 1949–2008

Abraham Stavchansky Altschuler (1 January 1933 – 5 March 2019), known as Abraham Stavans, was a Mexican actor and theater director. He was known for his work in film, telenovelas, and other television series, including the Mexican sitcom, El Chavo del Ocho. Stavans appeared in more than thirty telenovelas and forty-five plays and theater productions during his career.

== Biography ==
Stavans was born Abraham Stavchansky Altschuler in 1933 in Mexico City to Jewish immigrants from the Pale of Settlement. After early schooling, he began studying theater in 1949 at the Instituto Andrés Soler of the National Association of Actors (ANDA). As a student, he studied under the noted theater directors, José de Jesús Aceves and Seki Sano.

Stavans made his acting debut, at the age of 20, in the Spanish-language stage productions of "Las cinco preciosidades francesas" and "Prueba de fuego" by American playwright Arthur Miller. His professional work as a theater director began in 1981 with the production of "Frío almacenaje" (Cold Storage). He compiled more than forty-five stage credits as an actor and theater director during his career.

In addition to his work in theater and television, Stavans appeared in several Mexican and international films. His notable roles included Once Upon a Scoundrel (1973), a James Bond film, Licence to Kill (1989); Original Sin (2001), in which he played opposite Angelina Jolie and Antonio Banderas; Morirse está en hebreo (2007), and The Story of Pancho Villa.

Stavans also taught theater with his wife, Ofelia, including a course called "Psicoteatro para crecimiento personal."

Abraham Stavans died on March 5, 2019, at the age of 86. He was survived by his three children: Ilan Stavans, an essayist and professor at Columbia University in the United States, Darien, and Liora Stavchansky.

== Filmography ==
Year	Title	Role	Notes
1973	The Mansion of Madness		
1973	Once Upon a Scoundrel	Santos	
1978	Cananea	Empleado recepción	
1979	El Chavo del Ocho	Customer / Amusement Park Owner	TV series
1989	Licence to Kill	Isthmus City Hotel Bellboy	Uncredited
1994	A ritmo de salsa		
1996	Sucesos distantes	Pablo Mazur	
2001	Original Sin	Mr. Gutiérrez	
2004-2006	Rebelde	Joel Huber	TV series
2007	Morirse está en Hebreo	Balkoff	
2012	Morgana	Old librarian	
