= Once Upon a Scoundrel =

1974 film by George Schaefer

- Directed by: George Schaefer
- Written by: Norman Spencer Graham; Alford Van Ronkel
- Produced by: James S. Elliott; Donald E. Leon; Hal J. Webb
- Starring: Zero Mostel; Katy Jurado; A Martinez
- Cinematography: Gabriel Figueroa
- Edited by: Alberto Valenzuela
- Music by: Alex North
- Production companies: Carlyle Productions; Estudios Churubusco
- Release date: 15 August 1974
- Running time: 99 minutes
- Countries: Mexico; United States
- Language: English/Spanish

Once Upon a Scoundrel is a 1974 American-Mexican comedy film directed by George Schaefer and starring Zero Mostel, Katy Jurado and A Martinez.

== Cast ==
- Zero Mostel as Carlos del Refugio
- Katy Jurado as Aunt Delfina
- A Martinez as Luis Manuel
- Pancho Córdova
- Priscilla Garcia as Alicia
- Xavier Marc
- Tamara Garina
- Rita Macedo
- Abraham Stavans
- José Chávez
- Chano Urueta
- Carlos Nieto
- Gastón Melo
- Hilda Moreno
- Carlos Romano
- Aurora Clavel
- Alicia del Lago
- León Singer
- Juan Andres
- Aurora Muñoz
- Cecilia Camacho
- Pepe Gonzales
- Arturo Hernandez
- Titos Vandis as Dr. Fernandez

== See also ==
- List of American films of 1974

== Bibliography ==
- Roberts, Jerry. Encyclopedia of Television Film Directors. Scarecrow Press, 2009.
