= Humus (band) =

Mexican psychedelic band

- Origin: Mexico City, Mexico
- Genres: Progressive rock, psychedelic rock
- Years active: 1987–present
- Website: humusband.com

Humus is a psychedelic band from Mexico that has been active since the late 1980s.

== History ==
=== Early history ===
Humus was founded in 1987 by Jorge Beltran as a one man band, where he played all instruments in home recordings made through the ping pong recording technique. He chose the name "Humus" based on the earthy, humus-like sound caused by sound degradation caused by the reduction mixing. During the late 1980s and early 1990s Beltran released five cassettes, causing interest in the underground quarters of Mexico City, where there had been a long history of progressive rock.

Jose Luis Garnica, a long time friend of Jorge's and a rock connoisseur, was very much impressed by the quality of sound of these recordings, but mostly by Beltran's musicianship, so he became producer of Humus's first LP, Tus Oidos mienten in June 1992. The album finally gave recording status to Humus, and soon international reviews from the U.S., Germany, France, and in particular from Italy began to emerge, praising the new band from Mexico.

=== Second album and lineup change ===
From the second album, called simply Humus (released Dec. 1994), the one man band concept changed to a live performing band, which included old time school friend and bass player Victor Basurto, with whom he had formed their first band, Stomago Sagrado in the late 1970s. Victor had designed the cover for Tus Oidos Mienten, and has been in charge for the art of all recordings both musicians have been involved with ever since.

Several local tours took place, and the drum stool was occupied by no fewer than 8 drummers during the 1990s and well nigh into the 21st century.

=== Third and fourth albums and side project ===
A third album, Malleus Crease was released in 1995. This album, along with brother Project Frolic Froth's album Ouroboros were also released in Italy by the D-dabliu label in LP format. Humus 4 degrees, released in 1997, is the band's only album to exist only in CD format, all others were both CD and LP productions. This album was released through Smogless Records and newly formed Nuggetphase productions, and from there all albums produced by either of the bands led by Jorge and Victor have been released in the Nuggetphase label.

Also in 1997 Humus found themselves in an international tour of England and Italy. In Exeter they recorded an album with american Dave Tor, who became singer for the only vocal album ever made by either Jorge or Victor, and for this project a new name was devised: Euphoric Darkness, since it detached completely from the instrumental approach always favoured by Humus. The resulting album was named Colours You Can Hear and only 100 copies were made.

=== Fifth album to present ===
In Pesaro they recorded Humus's fifth album, Whispering Galleries, under the production of Italy's doom metal legend Paul Chain, who also contributed to the album. Three hundred numbered copies were made.

Since 1998 Humus has recorded no less than five albums, though none has been released as of 2014. The band continues to be active, though members live in different continents: Jorge Beltran lives in Mexico and Victor Basurto lives in The Netherlands. The manage to continue playing together through the use of the new communication technologies. Because of their limited press runs, Humus albums have been rare, and some of them reach up to US$250 in international distributor listings. However, late in 2006 Smogless Records put out new CD editions of the first three Humus albums, Tus Oidos Mienten, Humus, and Malleus Crease. A totally new album called Happy Days Ahead was independently released on July 23, 2011, the first one in digital format only, available through some of the main digital stores.

== Current members ==
- Jorge Beltrán: guitars, keyboards
- Victor Basurto: bass
- Charly López: drums
- Enrique Curiel: keyboards
- Pepe Bobadilla: keyboards, acoustic guitar

== Discography ==
=== Cassettes ===
- Sientate y escucha (1988)
- Cero Melodico (1989)
- Jardines Colgantes (1989)
- Sopa Invisible (1990)
- Planepantla (1992)

=== LPs and CDs ===
- Tus Oidos Mienten (1992)
- Humus (1994)
- Malleus Crease (1995)
- Four Degrees (1997)
- Whispering Galleries (1999)
- Happy Days Ahead (2011)
- Wheel Of Malarkey (2014)
- A Heavy Journey With... (Compilation) (2021)

=== Other releases ===
- "Brylereem" (included in the International psychedelic compilation "Floralia 2"), 1996. On/Off Records, Italy.
- "El Vampiro" (included in the international Horror Movies soundtracks tribute "E tu vivrai nel terror"), 1998, Black Widow Records, Italy.
- "No Man's Land" (included in the international Syd Barrett tribute album "Love You"), 2021, Gonzo multimedia. U.K.
