= María Carmen África Vidal Claramonte =

Spanish translation scholar (born 1964)

María Carmen África Vidal Claramonte, also quoted as África Vidal (born 1964), is a Spanish translation scholar and author. She is professor of Translation Studies at the University of Salamanca.

She has written 17 books, 12 anthologies and over 100 articles about translation studies, gender studies, advertising, media, post-colonialism, globalization, and literary criticism.

== Selected works ==
- Ilan Stavans, traductor. Comares, 2022. (in Spanish)
- Translation and Repetition. Rewriting (Un)original Literature. Routledge, 2022.
- Translation and Contemporary Art. Transdisciplinary Encounters, 2022.
- Traducción y literatura translingüe. Voces latinas en Estados Unidos, 2021.
- La traducción y la(s) historia(s). Nuevas vías para la investigación, 2018.
- “Dile que le he escrito un blues”. Del texto como partitura a la partitura como traducción en la literatura latinoamericana, 2017.
- Traducción, medios de comunicación, opinión pública (co-editor with María Rosario Martín Ruano). Comares, 2016. (in Spanish)
- Traducción, manipulación, desconstrucción, 1995.
