= Continuidad de los parques =

- Short story by Julio Cortázar
- Language: Spanish
- Genre: Short Story

Publication
- Published in: 1964

"Continuidad de los parques" (English: "The Continuity of Parks") is a short story in Spanish by Argentine writer Julio Cortázar (1914–1984). It was first published in 1964 in the Final del juego.

== Plot ==
The story begins with a landowner reading a novel that he had started a few days earlier. He had been sidetracked by business matters and a trip to town to discuss a matter of joint ownership, but on his return to his estate, he resumes reading the novel. He sits in a high-backed, green velvet armchair, savoring the "almost perverse pleasure" of reading the story while enjoying his cigarettes and the view of the park from his study window. In his novel, a man and woman, two lovers, meet in the woods to carry out a plan.

The novel that the businessman is reading is about a couple of lovers who are meeting in a cabin in the woods. He has a wound on the face from a branch, and she is waiting for him. She wants to caress him but he rejects her because they have planned this meeting to finalize how they were going to kill someone. They review their alibis and eliminate possible errors. Nightfall is approaching. In the second paragraph, the woman goes north, while the man approaches a house on the estate. Armed with the dagger, the man goes inside the house, all according to plan and sees his victim: a man sitting in a green velvet armchair reading a novel.

At that moment, the two stories join, as the (real) reader realizes that the man in the chair is the victim of the two lovers in the novel he is reading.

== Characters ==
- The man reading – Despite owning an estate and attending to matters of joint ownership in town, the man enjoys the privacy of reading a romantic murder mystery in his study. Through his perspective, the narrator describes the dual consciousness in the experience of reading. He is absorbed into the fictional world of his novel while still being aware of kinesthetic sensations of his own world, such as the texture of the chair, the cigarettes at hand, and the wind blowing outside.
- The heroine – A woman is meeting her lover at a mountain cabin in the woods. She is apprehensive, caught in a "sordid dilemma", and is meeting for the last time in the cabin to finalize plans and alibis before heading north.
- The hero – He is the woman's lover. The wound on his face from a branch and his rejection of the woman's caresses suggests his impatience and tension. He carries a dagger and has been given information about the layout of house, the absence of dogs and estate manager, and the location of his victim. Through his point of view, the narrator vividly describes his movements, the details of the house, and his victim—a man reading.

== Analysis ==
"The Continuity of Parks" is, according to Lauro Zavala, "simultaneously the fiction and metafiction most studied in the history of literature". In the story, reality and fiction intertwine through a story within a story. The frame story presents a man reading a novel on his return to his home estate after completing some "urgent business" in town. The novel that he is reading, the embedded story, describes two lovers who meet in a cabin in the woods, with a plan to destroy "that other body". The structure of the story is broken when one of the characters of the novel, the embedded story, introduces himself into the reality of the frame story.

The reader of the novel is an ironic adaptation of Cortázar's passive reader, who "does not want problems but solutions, or false problems that allow others to suffer comfortably sitting in his chair, without committing himself to the drama that should also be his". At the end of the story, the drama he does not want to be a part of is his own.

The name of the story refers to the different contexts, or reality planes, which are identified as "parks". The first is the author and reader of "The Continuity of Parks", the second is the frame story of a man of business reading a novel, and the third is the embedded story about the two lovers. The fourth is the conflict between an editor who claims that there is a fourth park, and another editor who disputes this interpretation.

The story is divided in two paragraphs of 380 and 170 words. The first paragraph presents the frame story of the man reading and the embedded story of the lovers meeting in a cabin in the woods. The second paragraph provides detailed description, an excess of information, that constitutes a case of paralysis. There are several allusions that parody the murder mystery, both in its rules and in its logic.

The story begins by introducing a landowner who escapes from his business responsibilities by taking refuge in his study to read a novel. He seems to take pleasure in sitting in a high-backed armchair covered in green velvet as he reads and looks out the windows. This space is not accidental: everything is organized and closed to the outside. The novel that he reads has the style of a simple plot and realistic characters, with a final scene that shows two lovers in a cabin planning a murder, creating a disturbing atmosphere in the story within the story. The actions of the fictitious reader are described with words that suggest passivity (rest, armchair, sprawl, etc.) while the actions of the lovers present suspenseful action (blood, kisses, dagger, etc.).

The text presents a labyrinthine temporal succession. The real reader begins reading the story as innocently as the character reading his novel. The closer to the end of the story and the embedded novel respectively, both readers feel that something terrible will happen. In the last paragraph the reader-character becomes a victim and the real reader becomes guilty for imagining the death of the character. The lack of closure of the story for not having read the novel makes the end disappear, evidencing the guilt of the real reader, who has become victimized or an accomplice in the death of the character while watching the crime. But it is also a double crime, since the real reader is also a real victim because the end of the story has disappeared, at the same time that he is an imaginary victim by his own imagination. This conclusion multiplies the doubts instead of revealing the mystery. When the character reader dies, the two realities are confused.
