= Frolic Froth =

Frolic Froth is a psychedelic band formed in Mexico City by members Victor Basurto (bass) and Arturo López (drums) of Loch Ness, and Jorge Beltrán (guitar) from Humus. These three musicians had previously played together in diverse bands along with other musicians during the 1980s and good part of the 1990s, until they finally decided to break away from the sound of previous bands and start Frolic Froth.

Their sound is a heavy in the old psychedelic sense, basically being a tribute to Germany's Guru Guru, Jimi Hendrix and the avant-garde groups known as 'Rock in Opposition': Henry Cow (England), Etron Fou Lelublan (France), Faust (Germany), and others. Some international polls have voted them (in particular the album Ouroboros) as one of the most influential psychedelic albums from Mexico.

They have recorded four albums, but only released two:

- Eponymous, 1996, CD.
- Ouroboros, 1996, CD, LP (manufactured in Italy)

Victor Basurto and Jorge Beltrán continue to collaborate in other bands like Humus, Smoking The Century Away and Ascetic Chuckwalla.
