= Thomas Christensen (author) =

American author, translator, and publisher

Thomas W. Christensen (born September 29, 1948) is an American author, translator, and publisher. He is known for his publications on literature, history, and art; his literary translations from French and Spanish; and his work as an editor and publisher.

== Biography ==
Born in Myrtle Point, Oregon, Christensen received advanced degrees in comparative literature from the University of Wisconsin-Madison. After travels in Latin America he relocated to the San Francisco Bay Area and worked as an editor and publishing executive at the independent trade book publishing companies North Point Press and Mercury House. Married to translator Carol Christensen, he lives in the San Francisco Bay Area.

== Publishing work ==
Christensen joined North Point Press in 1980, shortly after the press's founding, and worked there until 1989 as a senior editor. Among the authors he worked closely with were Gina Berriault, Wendell Berry, Kay Boyle, Evan S. Connell, and Gary Snyder. He joined Mercury House in 1990 as executive director and editor-in-chief, serving in that capacity until 1999. At Mercury House he published such authors as Harold Brodkey, Leonard Michaels, Alison Deming, and Lucille Eichengreen. Under his direction Mercury House was short-listed for a Carey Thomas Award for creative publishing from Publishers Weekly. He subsequently directed the publishing program of the Asian Art Museum in San Francisco. He is currently a contributing editor of Catamaran Literary Reader in Santa Cruz, California, where he has edited such authors as Douglas Brinkley, Jonathan Franzen, Jane Vandenburgh, and Lawrence Weschler.

== Translations ==
Christensen's best-known book-length translation is Like Water for Chocolate by Laura Esquivel. Other notable authors he has translated include Carlos Fuentes, Laura Esquivel, Alejo Carpentier, Louis Ferdinand Céline, and Jose Angel Valente. He often collaborates with his wife, Carol Christensen. In 2000, he received an award for dedication to translation from the American Literary Translators Association and was short-listed for a PEN USA West Literary Award for Translation. His translations include:

- Selected Poems of José Ángel Valente (translation from Spanish). Archipelago Press, Spring 2013
- Vida Clandestina: My Life in the Cuban Revolution by Enrique Oltuski (translation from Spanish), Jossey Bass, September 2002
- Nocturnal Butterflies of the Russian Empire by José Manuel Prieto (translation from Spanish) Grove Atlantic, November 2001*
- Ballets Without Music, Without Dancers, Without Anything by Louis-Ferdinand Céline (translation from French), Sun & Moon / Green Integer, January 2000 (finalist, PEN USA West 2000 Literary Awards)
- Like Water for Chocolate by Laura Esquivel (co-translator from Spanish), Anchor Doubleday, August 1992
- Galíndez by Manuel Vázquez Montalbán (co-translator from Spanish), Atheneum, June 1992
- Mexico the Beautiful Cookbook by Susana Palazuelos (co-translator from Spanish), Weldon Owen, August, 1991
- The Harp and the Shadow by Alejo Carpentier (co-translator from Spanish), Mercury House, June, 1990
- Constancia and Other Stories for Virgins by Carlos Fuentes (translation from Spanish), Farrar, Straus & Giroux, March 1990
- 'Cold Tales by Virgilio Piñera (editor/translator from Spanish), Eridanos Press, October 1988
- Around the Day in Eighty Worlds by Julio Cortázar (translation from Spanish), North Point Press, 1986.

== Original writings ==
Christensen's writing has focused on literature, history, and art, often with an emphasis on globalism. An early work in this vein was The U.S.-Mexican War, which Carlos Fuentes called 'the clearest, most balanced and fully documented account' of the conflict.

1616: The World in Motion, a global study of one year in the early seventeenth century, is the author's most widely praised book. According to Contemporary Authors,

Several critics praised the book as a lively, often surprising, yet substantial work of history. It 'is a delight, an adventure, a reading and visual treat of the first order,' with Christensen uncovering 'many unimagined and unprecedented connections,' remarked David Walton in the [Cleveland Plain Dealer]. He added: 'The color art of this book is central, and catalyzes the art of digression. Richly, beautifully illustrated, with long, fascinating captions, this is a book to get lost in, hour by hour.' On the ForeWord Reviews website, Leia Menlove noted that 'Christensen manages to portray and connect disparate events with remarkable cogency,' in a style that 'is droll and at times hilarious.' A [Publishers Weekly reviewer ]called [1616] 'a stunning overview of the nascent modern world,' and [Maclean's contributor] Brian Bethune observed that 'Christensen shines ... in his tales of individuals incongruently ricocheting around this newly opened world.'

In April 2016 "1616" will provide the template for a three-day multidisciplinary symposium at Rhodes College in Memphis. Christensen will deliver the keynote address.

In 2014 Christensen published River of Ink: Literature, History, Art, a collection of essays selected from across his career. According to a profile of the author in the San Jose Mercury News, "with dozens of full-color illustrations, the book is a dazzling cabinet of wonders for anyone seeking knowledge about the wider world." Christensen's books include:

- River of Ink: Literature, History, Art. Counterpoint Press, Fall 2014
- 1616: The World in Motion. Counterpoint Press, January 2012
- New World/New Words: Translating Latin American Literature. Center for the Art of Translation, Winter 2006-2007
- The Asian Art Museum of San Francisco. Art Spaces Series. Scala, 2004
- Bridge to Understanding: The Art and Architecture of San Francisco's Asian Art Museum–Chong-Moon Lee Center for Asian Art and Culture. Asian Art Museum, March 2003
- The U.S.–Mexican War. Co-author with Carol Christensen. Bay Books, February, 1998
- In Few Words / En Pocas Palabras: A Compendium of Latino Folk Wit and Wisdom. By José Antonio Burciaga; credited editor (completed after the author's death). Mercury House, January 1997
- The American Promise: Adventures in Grass-roots Democracy. Ghost written with co-editorial credit. KQED Books, October, 1995
- The Discovery of America and Other Myths: A New World Reader. Co-editor with Carol Christensen. Chronicle Books, October 1992.
