= Ilan Stavans =

American writer and academic

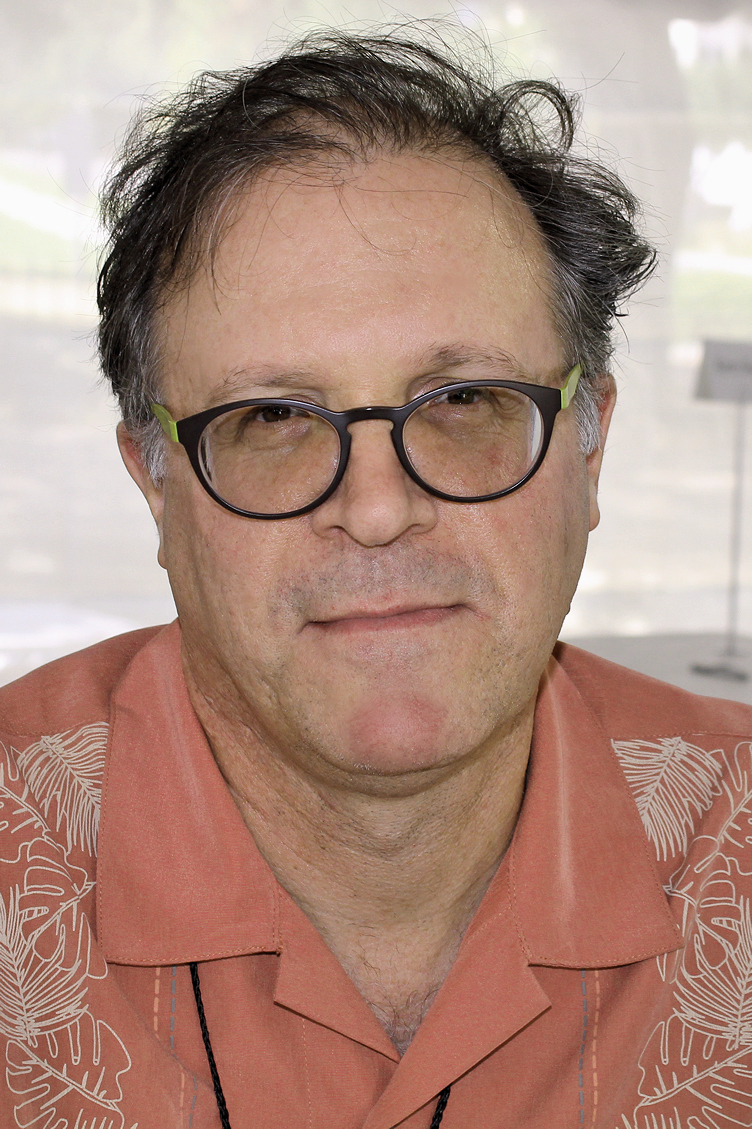
- Stavans at the 2015 Texas Book Festival.
- Born: Ilan Stavchansky; 1961 (age 64–65); Mexico City, Mexico
- Education: Jewish Theological Seminary; Columbia University
- Occupation: Author
- Relatives: Abraham Stavans (father)

Ilan Stavans (born Ilán Stavchansky, 1961) is a Mexican-born Jewish-American writer and academic. He writes and speaks on American, Hispanic, and Jewish cultures. He is the author of Quixote (2015) and a contributor to the Norton Anthology of Latino Literature (2010). He was the host of the syndicated PBS show Conversations with Ilan Stavans, which ran from 2001 to 2006.

== Early life and education ==
Ilan Stavans was born in Mexico in 1961 to a middle-class Jewish family; his father's ancestors had immigrated from the Russian Pale of Settlement. His parents were born in Mexico City. His father, Abraham Stavans, was a Mexican telenovela actor. His mother, Ofelia Stavans, taught theater.

After living in Europe, Latin America, and the Middle East, Stavans immigrated to the United States in 1985, and became a naturalized U.S. citizen in 1994. He earned a master's degree from the Jewish Theological Seminary and a PhD from Columbia University.

== Career ==
Since 1993 he has been on the faculty at Amherst College, where he is the Lewis-Sebring Professor of Humanities and Latin American and Latino Culture. He is on the editorial board of the literary magazine The Common. He has taught at various other institutions, including Columbia University.

Stavans's work includes both scholarly monographs, such as The Hispanic Condition (1995), and comic strips, as in his graphic book Latino USA: A Cartoon History (with Lalo Alcaraz) (2000).

Stavans has edited anthologies, including The Oxford Book of Jewish Stories (1998). A selection of his work appeared in 2000 under the title The Essential Ilan Stavans. In 2004, on the occasion of the 100th anniversary of Pablo Neruda's birth, Stavans edited the 1,000-page-long The Poetry of Pablo Neruda. The same year he edited the 3-volume set of Isaac Bashevis Singer: Collected Stories for the Library of America.

His autobiography is entitled On Borrowed Words: A Memoir of Language (2001). He is best known for his investigations of language and culture. His love for lexicography is evident in his memoir, Dictionary Days: A Defining Passion (2005).

He has written influential essays on the Mexican comedian, Mario Moreno ("Cantinflas"); the lampooner José Guadalupe Posada, the Chicano leader César Chávez, and the Tejana singer Selena. He wrote a book about the board game Lotería! (with Teresa Villegas), which includes his own poems. Stavans was featured in one of the Smithsonian Q&A books.

== Honors and awards ==
In 1998, Stavans was awarded a Guggenheim Fellowship. He has also received international prizes and honors for his writings, including the Latino Literature Prize (Latin American Writers Institute, New York), 1992, for his novella Talia y el cielo (Talia in heaven); Chile's Presidential Medal; and the Rubén Darío Distinction.

== Influence ==
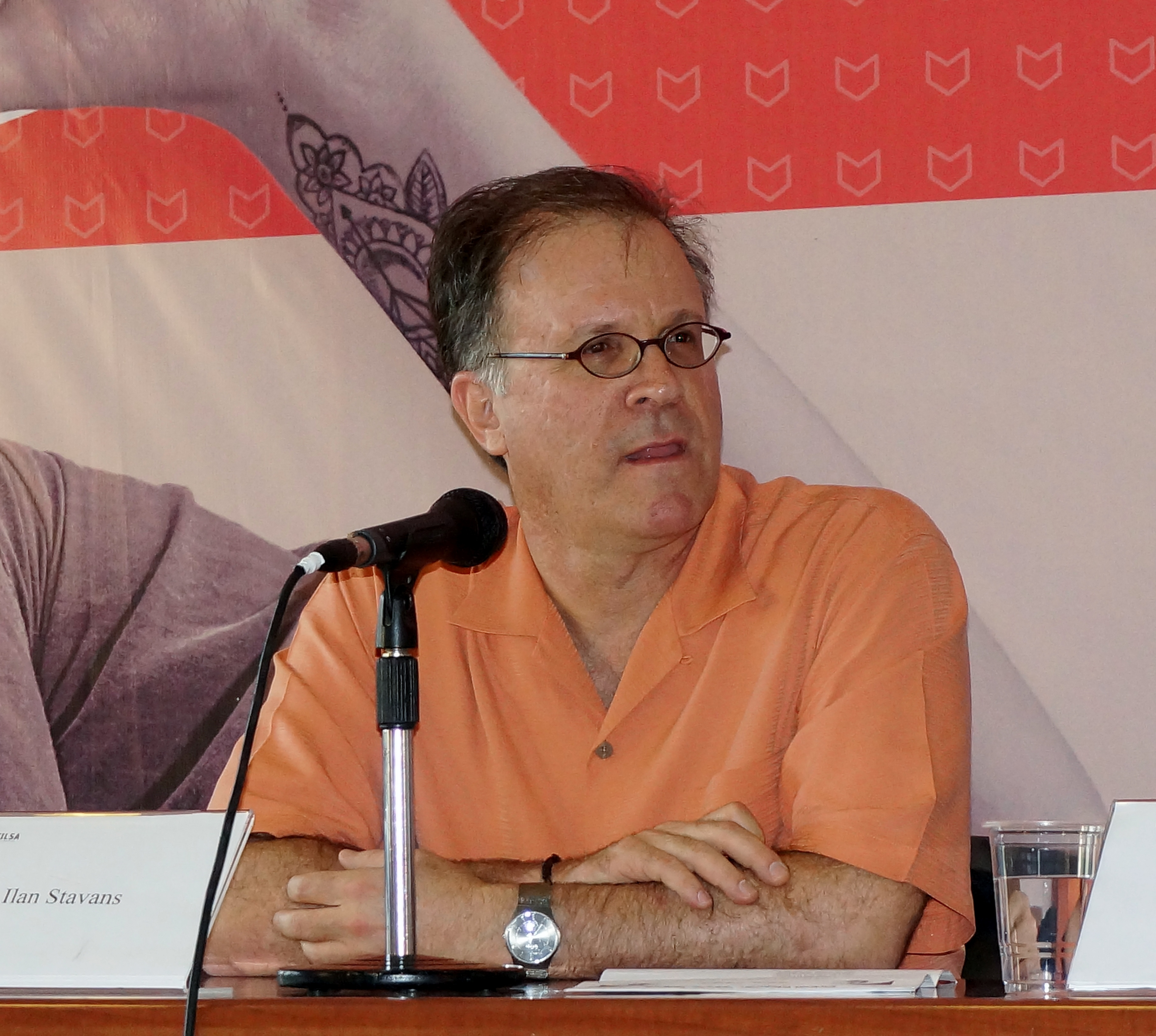
Stavans at the Santiago International Book Fair 2017

Stavans writes on Jewish-American identity as Eurocentric and parochial. He has been a critic of the nostalgia in this community for the past of the Eastern European shtetls of the 19th century.

His work explores Jewish culture in the Hispanic world. In 1994 he published the anthology Tropical Synagogues: Stories by Jewish-Latin American Writers (1994). From 1997 to 2005 he edited the Jewish Latin America series published by the University of New Mexico Press. His anthology, The Schocken Book of Modern Sephardic Literature (2005), received a National Jewish Book Award. In his The Inveterate Dreamer: Essays and Conversations on Jewish Culture (2001), he explores Jewish writing in every major language, including variations such as Yiddish, Ladino, and others. His work has been translated into a dozen languages.

He has been influenced by Jorge Luis Borges, Edmund Wilson, and Walter Benjamin. (In his autobiography, Stavans says that in the early stages of his career, in order to find his own style, he burned his collection of dozens of Borges's books, p. 9.) He has written a biography of Oscar "Zeta" Acosta, a Chicano lawyer. He wrote a book-long meditation on Mexican poet Octavio Paz. He wrote a preface in Spanglish to Poets, Philosophers, Lovers: On the Writings of Giannina Braschi.

He wrote a biography, Gabriel García Márquez: The Early Years (2010), the first of two planned volumes. Stavans traces the artistic development of Márquez from childhood to the publication of One Hundred Years of Solitude in Spanish in 1967 (it was translated by Gregory Rabassa and published in English in 1970).

In A Critic's Journey (2009), Stavans address three cultures: Jewish, American, and Mexican. It includes pieces on writing On Borrowed Words, the legacy of the Holocaust in Latin America, the growth of Latino studies in the U.S. academy, Stavans's relationship with The Jewish Daily Forward, and translation in the shaping of Hispanic culture. He also includes pieces on writers Sandra Cisneros, Richard Rodríguez, Isaiah Berlin, and W. G. Sebald, and close readings of Don Quixote and the oeuvre of Roberto Bolaño.

== Spanglish ==
Stavans is a sociolinguist, principally researching Spanglish, a hybrid form of communication that merges Spanish and English. He edited a dictionary of Spanglish words called Spanglish: The Making of a New American Language (2003), which provides historical analysis of the development of this linguistic form and highlights Spanglish use in literary works by major Latino authors Piri Thomas, Giannina Braschi, Sandra Cisneros, and Junot Díaz. Stavans says Spanglish first developed after 1848, when the Treaty of Guadalupe Hidalgo was signed after the Mexican–American War ended and a large portion of Mexican land was ceded to the United States.

He describes various distinctive varieties of Spanglish, such as Cubonics (Cuban-American), Dominicanish (Dominican-American), Nuyorican (Puerto Rican in New York), and Chicano (Mexican American). Defining differences across generational and geographical lines, he states that recent immigrants are prone to use a type of Spanglish that differs from that of second- or third-generation Latinos. Stavans studies Spanglish by making comparisons with Black English and Yiddish, as well as Yinglish (a type of Yiddish spoken by Jewish immigrants to the United States and their children). He also draws cultural parallels between Spanglish and jazz, rap, hip-hop, and graffiti.

In 2002, Stavans published a Spanglish translation of the first chapter of Miguel de Cervantes' Don Quixote in the Barcelona newspaper La Vanguardia. Stavans stated that Spanglish is today's manifestation of mestizaje, the mixture of racial, social, and cultural traits of Anglos and Latinos, similar to what occurred during the colonization of the Americas in the sixteenth century.

=== Criticism ===
Stavans's writings on Spanglish have been criticized by linguists such as John M. Lipski. Lipski holds that Stavans seems to view all code-switching as an act of creativity, which contradicts the linguistic understanding of spoken code-switching as a speech mode largely below conscious awareness and subject to basic syntactic restrictions. While code-switching is often used in US Latino literature and poetry, authors typically adhere to the same rules that govern spoken, spontaneous code-switching. Stavans's 'translations' of excerpts of classic works such as Leaves of Grass, Adventures of Huckleberry Finn, "The Gift Outright", and Don Quixote into Spanglish often include improbable Anglicisms (sudenmente), colloquial forms typical of rapid speech (pa'lante), unlikely phonetic combinations (saddleaba), and violations of typical constraints on code-switching (you no sabe). These translations cannot be the result of a poor attempt at mimicking bilingual speech, since Stavans is proficient at producing realistic code-switched language in his other writings. Stavans's translations have been frequently cited in Spanish-speaking countries as evidence of the supposed degraded state of Spanish in the US.

== The Norton Anthology of Latino Literature ==
Stavans served as general editor of The Norton Anthology of Latino Literature, a 2,700-page compendium that includes more than two hundred authors and covers from the colonial period (the earliest author included is Fray Bartolomé de las Casas) to the present time. The anthology features Mexican-Americans, Cuban-Americans, Puerto Ricans on the island and the mainland, and other Latinos. It also features a section with samples by Latin American writers, such as Octavio Paz and Roberto Fernández Retamar, discussing the United States. Among the featured writers in the anthology are Daniel Alarcón, Julia Alvarez, Giannina Braschi, Julia de Burgos, Fray Bartolomé de las Casas, Junot Díaz, Cristina García (journalist), Oscar Hijuelos, José Martí, Octavio Paz, Luis Rodríguez, Rolando Pérez (Cuban poet), Esmeralda Santiago, and William Carlos Williams.

The Norton Anthology was deemed an "essential source for academic libraries". It was reviewed by The Boston Globe, Smithsonian, the American Book Review, World Literature Today, Literal, and NPR's On Point. Erica Jong said "Ilan Stavans has spread a feast of Latino literature before us." Cornel West called it "an instant classic." And Felipe Fernández-Armesto of University of Notre Dame stated: "Imaginatively conceived, painstakingly executed, stunningly broad, profoundly stirring, endlessly engaging, this book can change the way the world thinks about America and the way Americans think about themselves." It was also criticized for his subjective selection; there were few authors born in Central America.

Stavans also coedited The FSG Book of Twentieth Century Latin American Poetry, (2011) a 728 page volume that contextualizes the history of Latin American poets, including José Martí, Rubén Darío, César Vallejo, Oswald de Andrade, Pablo Neruda, Violeta Parra, Nicanor Parra, Gabriela Mistral, Luis Palés Matos, Octavio Paz, Giannina Braschi, and Roberto Bolaño.

== Cultural studies ==
Stavans's works explores how dictionaries and language academies are buffers whose improbable function is to provide continuity for a language. He suggests that such continuity, especially in the age of rapid electronic communication, is fatuous. He accuses the Royal Academy of the Spanish Language in Madrid of colonialism of bias. He has studied the Iberian conquest of the Americas in the 16th century from a linguistic perspective. Stavans believes that translation represents cultural appropriation. He defines modernity as "a translated way of life".

=== Conversations about literature ===
In 2005, in a series of interviews with Neal Sokol published as Ilan Stavans: Eight Conversations, Stavans traces his beginnings, and calls Hispanic civilization to task for its reluctance to undertake constructive self-criticism. In addition, he discusses the work of numerous writers: Borges, Franz Kafka, Isaac Babel, Giannina Braschi, Sholem Aleichem, Gabriel García Márquez, Isaac Bashevis Singer, Octavio Paz, Samuel Johnson, Edward Said, Miguel de Cervantes, and others. He reflects on anti-Semitism and anti-Hispanic sentiment.

In Love and Language (2007), Stavans and translator Verónica Albin discuss the way the word "love" has changed through the ages. In Knowledge and Censorship (2008), Stavans explains the "acquisition of knowledge in multi-ethnic environments, the role that dictionaries play in the preservation of memory, the function of libraries in the electronic age, and the uses of censorship." Mordecai Drache, who writes for Zeek: A Jewish Journal of Thought and Culture, discusses with Stavans the Bible as a work of literature in With All Thine Heart (2010). Steven G. Kellman published The Restless Ilan Stavans: Outsider on the Inside (2019), the first book-length study of the author and his work (Latinx and Latin American Profiles, Pittsburgh).

== Books ==
- 1993 - Imagining Columbus: The Literary Voyage.
- 1994 - Tropical Synagogues.
- 1995 - The Hispanic Condition: Reflections on Culture and Identity in America.
- 1995 - Bandido. Oscar 'Zeta' Acosta and the Chicano Experience.
- 1996 - The One-Handed Pianist and Other Stories.
- 1996 - Art and Anger: Essays on Politics and the Imagination.
- 1998 - The Riddle of Cantinflas: Essays on Popular Hispanic Culture.
- 2000 - Latino U.S.A.: A Cartoon History, illustrations by Lalo López Alcaraz.
- 2000 - The Essential Ilan Stavans.
- 2001 - The Inveterate Dreamer: Essays and Conversations on Jewish Literature.
- 2001 - Octavio Paz: A Meditation.
- 2001 - On Borrowed Words: A Memoir of Language.
- 2003 - Spanglish: The Making of a New American Language.
- 2003 - Lotería!, art by Teresa Villegas, essay and riddles by Ilan Stavans.
- 2005 - Conversations with Ilan Stavans (with Neal Sokol).
- 2005 - Dictionary Days: A Defining Passion.
- 2006 - The Disappearance: A Novella and Stories.
- 2007 - Love and Language (with Verónica Albin).
- 2008 - Knowledge and Censorship (with Verónica Albin).
- 2008 - Mr. Spic Goes to Washington, illustrations by Roberto Weil.
- 2008 - Resurrecting Hebrew
- 2009 - A Critic's Journey
- 2010 - Gabriel García Márquez: The Early Years.
- 2010 - With All Thine Heart: Love and the Bible (with Mordecai Drache)
- 2011 - What is la hispanidad?: A Conversation (with Iván Jaksic)
- 2011 - José Vaconcelos: The Prophet of Race
- 2012 - Return to Centro Historico: A Mexican Jew Looks for His Roots.
- 2012 - El Iluminado (with Steve Sheinkin)
- 2013 - Golemito Juvenile fiction hardcover, illustrated by Teresa Villegas
- 2014 - A Most Imprefect Union (with Lalo Alcarez)
- 2015 - Quixote: The Novel and the World
- 2020 - Poets, Philosophers, Lovers: On the Writings of Giannina Braschi (with Frederick Luis Aldama and Tess O'Dwyer)
- 2020 - "Popol Vuh: A Retelling"

=== Television ===
Conversations with Ilan Stavans (PBS, La Plaza)

=== Films ===
Morirse está en hebreo / My Mexican Shivah (2006) Directed by Alejandro Springall.

== Bibliography ==
- Vidal, África (2022). Ilan Stavans, traductor (in Spanish). Comares.
