= Hispanophone =

Anything related to the Spanish language

Geographic distribution of the Spanish language: Official majority language Co-official or administrative language but not majority native language Secondary language (more than 20% Spanish speakers) or culturally important

Hispanophone (Spanish: Hispanohablante) refers to anything related to the Spanish language. The term is derived from the Latin word Hispanicus ("Spanish") which refers to anything pertaining to the historic Roman province of Hispania ("Spain"), and the word "phone". Hispanophone is linked to Hispanic culture which is the legacy of the vast and prolonged Spanish Empire, and the sense of identity of these people is sometimes referred to as Hispanidad (Hispanicity).

The Spanish-speaking world, also called the Hispanosphere, encompasses the following geographical areas: Spain, Hispanic America, Equatorial Guinea, and portions of the United States (namely the Southwest and Florida). When used in the broader sense to include areas where the local culture has been heavily impacted by Hispanic influences, the former Spanish East Indies colonies of the Philippines and (to a lesser extent) Guam are also included.

In addition to the general definition of Hispanophone, some groups in the Hispanic world make a distinction between Castilian-speaking (Note: Spanish: castellanohablante, castellanoparlante, or castellanófono) and Spanish-speaking, with the former term denoting the speakers of the Spanish language—also known as Castilian—and the latter the speakers of the Spanish or Hispanic languages (i.e. the languages of Spain or the languages of the Hispanic nations).

== Overview ==
Flag of the Hispanic People, adopted 12 October 1932

There are an estimated 474.7 million native Spanish speakers and about 100 million second and foreign language speakers around the world as of 2022, totaling 574 million Hispanophones in total. This makes Spanish the second most natively spoken language and fourth most spoken language overall globally. The vast majority of Hispanophones are concentrated in the Hispanosphere, the countries and territories where Spanish is a native or significant language.

=== Countries ===
Countries where Spanish is considered the official language de jure or de facto

During the Spanish period between 1492 and 1898, many people from Spain migrated to the new lands they had conquered. The Spaniards took with them their language and culture, and integrated within the society they had settled, creating a large empire that stretched all over the world and producing several multiracial populations. Their influences are found in the following continents and countries that were originally colonized by the Spaniards.

Rank	Country/territory	Spanish-speaking population	Area (km^{2})	Area (sq mi)
1	Mexico	130,034,675	1,964,375	761,610
2	Colombia	52,090,983	1,141,748	440,831
3	Spain	47,250,026	505,944	195,365
4	Argentina	46,866,195	2,780,400	1,073,500
5	United States (Note: Note: Spanish is the second most spoken language in the U.S., but no language holds official status.)	45,481,557	9,147,593	3,531,905
6	Peru	29,601,626	1,285,215	496,225
7	Venezuela	28,631,153	916,445	353,841
8	Chile	19,315,922	756,102	291,930
9	Ecuador	16,963,223	283,561	109,484
10	Guatemala	13,722,652	108,889	42,042
11	Dominican Republic	10,323,570	48,671	18,792
12	Cuba	9,970,591	109,884	42,426
13	Honduras	9,548,292	112,492	43,433
14	Bolivia	9,197,806	1,098,581	424,164
15	Nicaragua	7,001,696	130,374	50,338
16	El Salvador	6,358,547	21,041	8,124
17	Costa Rica	5,510,005	51,179	19,760
18	Paraguay	5,222,154	406,752	157,065
19	Panama	3,925,898	75,417	29,119
20	Uruguay	3,557,812	181,034	69,898
21	Puerto Rico	2,834,581	9,104	3,515
22	Equatorial Guinea	1,245,206	28,052	10,831
	Total	504,654,170	21,162,853	8,174,198

=== Judeo-Spanish (Ladino) ===
Main Article: Judaeo-Spanish, See also: Sephardic Jews

Following the Spanish Inquisition in 1492, Sephardic Jews who were expelled from Spain brought their language to their new lands. This language is now known as Judeo Spanish or Ladino, and retains many unique grammatical structures from Old Castilian, in addition to other older Iberian languages such as Old Catalan, Galician, Asturleonese, Old Aragonese, and Mozarabic. The language is traditionally written in Hebrew script (using Rashi script), however has in modern times often been written with the Latin script.

The vast majority of Ladino speakers lived in the Ottoman Empire (specifically Anatolia and the Levant), Morocco, and the Balkans, with a minority in Italy, Greece, Brazil, and other locations along the Mediterranean Sea. In 2017, the language was officially recognised as a dialect of Spanish by the Royal Spanish Academy. As of 2018, Ethnologue estimated around 51,000 people to speak the language natively. Ethnologue has categorised the language as endangered.

== Geographic distribution of Spanish speakers ==
=== Europe ===
==== Spain ====
The languages of Spain

The modern-day nationalities that live in the region of ancient Hispania are the Portuguese, Spanish, Andorran and Gibraltarian people. Historically, the modern country of Spain was formed by the accretion of several independent Iberian kingdoms through dynastic inheritance, conquest and the will of the local elites. These kingdoms had their own nationalistic loyalties and political borders.

Today, there is no single Castilian–Spanish identity for the whole country. Spain is a de facto plurinational state. Many Spanish citizens feel no conflict in recognising their multiple ethnic identities at the same time. Spain is a culturally heterogeneous country, home to a wide range of cultures, each one with its own customs and traditions. Some such cultures have their own language. Since the beginning of the transition to democracy in Spain and the creation of the Spanish autonomous communities, after Francoist Spain, there have been many movements towards more autonomy (delegation of powers) in certain territories of the country, some with the aim of achieving full independence and others with the goal of improving the system of devolution and the state of the autonomies (or self-government entities).

The existence of multiple distinct cultures in Spain allows an analogy to be drawn to the United Kingdom. Using the term Spanish for someone of Spanish descent would then be expected to be equivalent to using Briton to describe someone descending from some part of the United Kingdom. Cultures within the United Kingdom, such as English, Irish, Scottish, and Welsh, would then correspond in this analogy to cultures within Spain such as Castilian, Catalan, Galician and Basque among others. In contrast with Spain, because of centuries of gradual and mutual consolidation across the Iberian Peninsula, such distinctions tend to be blurred. It is a subtle, yet important, distinction.

In Spain, as in the United Kingdom, the economically dominant territories—Castile and England—spread their language for mutual communication. However, the political dominance in the United Kingdom tends to be sharper compared to Spain, where most of medieval realms do not correspond with the actual boundaries of the autonomous communities, and the crown was unified into a sole monarch.

=== Americas ===
==== Hispanic America ====
Spanish is the most widely-spoken language of the Americas, as well as the official language in a great part of the Americas.

==== Origins and demography ====
Percentage of the U.S. population aged 5 and over who speak the Spanish language at home in 2019, by states.

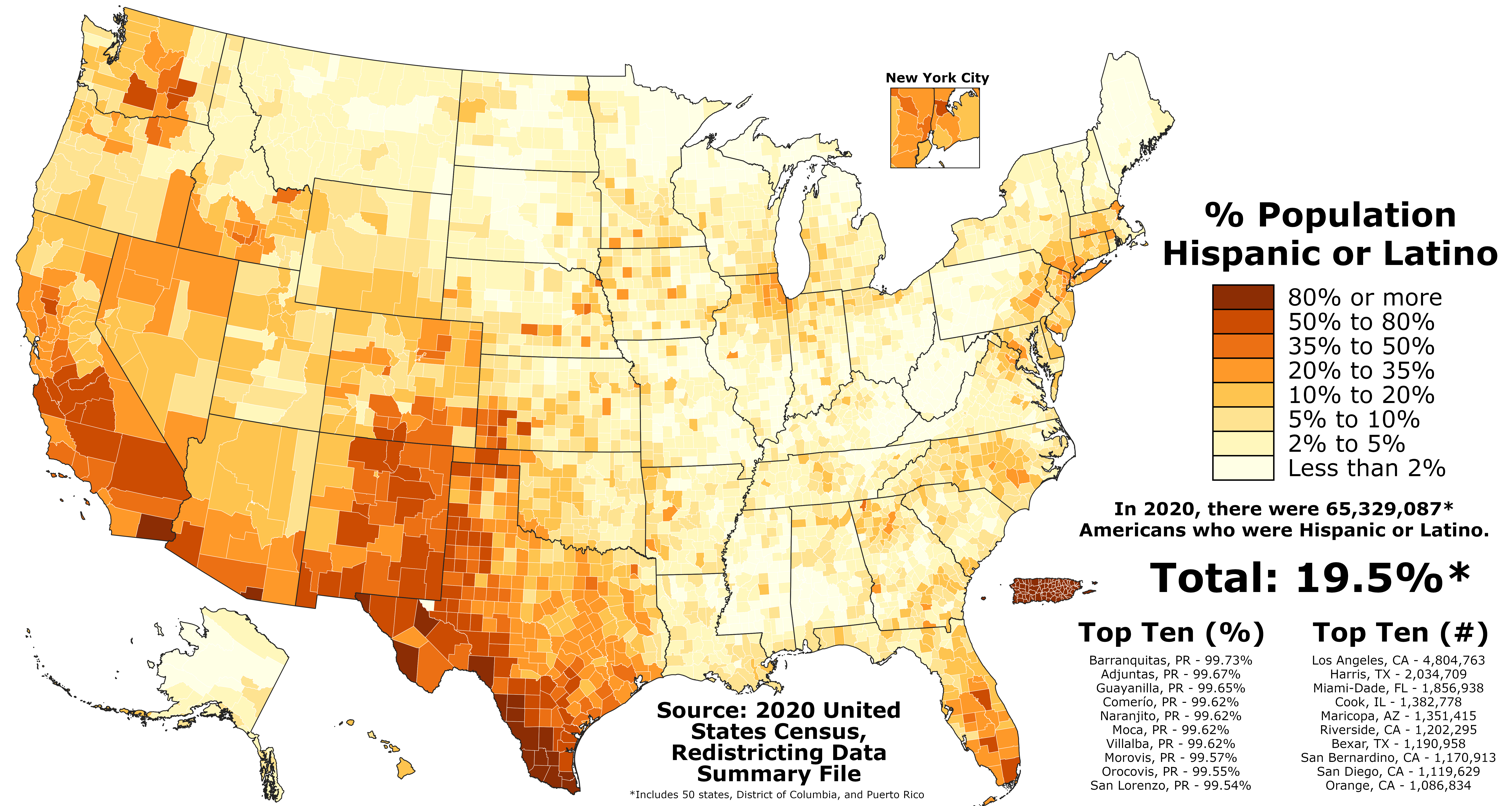
Distribution of Hispanics in the U.S. in the 2020 United States census.

U.S. Hispanics are citizens of the United States whose ancestry or national origin is of any of the nations composing the Hispanosphere. A Hispanic person's status is independent from whether or not he or she speaks the Spanish language, for not all Hispanic Americans speak Spanish. A Hispanic person may be of any race (White, Amerindian, mixed, Black, Asian or Pacific Islander). As of 2013 Hispanics accounted for 17.1% of the population, around 53.2 million people. This was an increase of 29% since 2004, when Hispanics were 14.1% of the population (around 41.3 million people). The Hispanic growth rate over the July 1, 2003 to July 1, 2004, period was 3.6% — higher than any other ancestral group in the United States — and more than three times the rate of the nation's total population (at 1.0%). The projected Hispanic population of the United States for July 1, 2050, is 105.6 million people. According to this projection, Hispanics will constitute 25% of the nation's total population by the year 2050.

Historically, a continuous Hispanic presence in the territory of the United States has existed since the 16th century, earlier than any other group after the Amerindians. Spaniards pioneered the present-day United States. The first confirmed European landing on the continent was that of Juan Ponce de León, who landed in 1513 on the shore he christened La Florida. Within three decades of Ponce de León's landing, the Spanish became the first Europeans to reach the Appalachian Mountains, the Mississippi River, the Grand Canyon, and the Great Plains. Spanish ships sailed along the East Coast, penetrating to present-day Bangor, Maine, and up the Pacific Coast as far as Alaska.

In 1540 Hernando de Soto undertook an extensive exploration of the present United States. In the same year Francisco Vásquez de Coronado led 2,000 Spaniards and Mexican Indians across today's Arizona–Mexico border and traveled as far as central Kansas, close to the exact geographic center of what is now the continental United States. Other Spanish explorers of the United States make up a long list that includes, among others, Lucas Vásquez de Ayllón, Pánfilo de Narváez, Sebastián Vizcaíno, Juan Rodríguez Cabrillo, Gaspar de Portolà, Pedro Menéndez de Avilés, Álvar Núñez Cabeza de Vaca, Tristán de Luna y Arellano, and Juan de Oñate. In all, Spaniards probed half of today's lower 48 states before the first English colonization attempt at Roanoke Island in 1585.

The Spanish created the first permanent European settlement in the continental United States, at St. Augustine, Florida, in 1565. Santa Fe, New Mexico also predates Jamestown, Virginia (founded in 1607) and Plymouth Colony (of Mayflower and Pilgrims fame, founded in 1620). Later came Spanish settlements in San Antonio, Tucson, San Diego, Los Angeles, and San Francisco, to name just a few. The Spanish even established a Jesuit mission in Virginia's Chesapeake Bay 37 years before the founding of Jamestown.

Two iconic American stories have Spanish antecedents, too. Almost 80 years before John Smith's alleged rescue by Pocahontas, a man by the name of Juan Ortiz told of his remarkably similar rescue from execution by an Indian girl. Spaniards also held a thanksgiving—56 years before the famous Pilgrims festival—when they feasted near St. Augustine with Florida Indians, probably on stewed pork and garbanzo beans. As late as 1783, at the end of the American Revolutionary War, Spain held claim to roughly half of today's continental United States (see New Spain); in 1775, Spanish ships even reached Alaska. From 1819 to 1848, the United States increased the nation's area by roughly a third of former Spanish and Mexican territory, including today's three most populous states: California, Texas, and Florida. Hispanics became the first American citizens in the newly acquired Southwest territory and remained the ancestral majority in several states until the 20th century, and a large minority in the 21st century.

Hispanic Americans have fought in all the wars of the United States and have earned some of the highest distinctions awarded to U.S. soldiers (list of Hispanic Medal of Honor recipients). Historic figures in the United States have been Hispanic from early times.

==== National Hispanic Heritage Month ====
The National Hispanic Heritage Month is celebrated in the United States from September 15 to October 15.

==== Diversity ====
The people of Hispanophone countries encompass many different ethnic backgrounds. Though in countries like the United States, Hispanics may often be stereotyped as having a typical Mediterranean/Amerindian/Southern European appearance - olive skin, dark hair, and dark eyes.

Most Hispanics in the United States have their origins in countries such as El Salvador, Cuba, and Mexico, with 90% of Salvadorans, 95% of Paraguayans, and 70% of Mexicans identifying as mestizo, with Mexico having the largest total mestizo population at over 66 million.

In the United States, Hispanics, regardless of self-identified racial background, are labeled Hispanic by the U.S. census. They may have varying of European ancestry, such as Spanish origins, and Amerindian or African roots. From 1850 to 1920, the U.S. Census form did not distinguish between whites and Mexican Americans. In 1930, the U.S. Census form asked for "color or race", and census enumerators were instructed to write W for white and Mex for Mexican. In 1940 and 1950, the census reverted its decision and made Mexicans be classified as white again and thus the instructions were to "Report white (W) for Mexicans unless they were definitely of full Indigenous Indian or other non-white races (such as Black or Asian)."

Of the over 35 million Hispanics counted in the Federal 2000 Census, 47.9% identified as White (termed White Hispanic by the Census Bureau); 42.2% some other race; 6.3% two or more races; 2% Black or African American; 1.2% American Indian and Alaska Native; 0.3% Asian; and 0.1% Native Hawaiian and Other Pacific Islander. Even among those Hispanics who reported one race only, most would also possess at least some ancestral lineage from one or more other races, despite the fact that only 6.3% reported as such (this is also applicable to the non-Hispanics counted in the U.S. Census, although maybe in less proportion).

According to one study (Stephens et al. 2001), from the genetic perspective, Hispanics generally represent a differential mixture of European, Native American, and African ancestry, with the proportionate mix typically depending on country of origin.

The populations of Iberia (both Spain and Portugal), like all European populations, have received multiple other influences, even though they are still largely descended from the prehistoric European populations, and to a greater degree than any other major group.

=== Africa ===
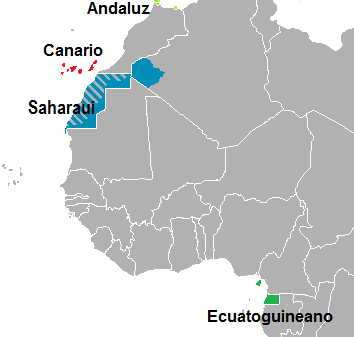
Spanish dialects in Hispanic Africa

==== Equatorial Guinea ====
In the former Spanish province of Equatorial Guinea, although Portuguese and French are co-official languages, the majority of the population speak Spanish. There is a small minority of African people who possessed Spanish and other European ancestry. These individuals form less than 1% of the population.

==== Morocco ====
Portions of the north coast of Morocco were a former Spanish protectorate and Spanish remains spoken by about 1.7 million people as of 2018. This makes Morocco the country with the most Spanish speakers outside the Hispanophone world unless the United States is excluded. However, demand for Spanish and overall competency in the language has fallen since the start of the 21st century and the most popular foreign language is now English (as French is considered a second and mandatory language in the country).

==== Spanish territories in North Africa ====
Since the Reconquista, Spain has held numerous emplacements in North Africa. Most of them were promptly lost, but to date, with an approximate population of 143,000 people, the autonomous cities of Ceuta and Melilla, which constitute the two plazas de soberanía mayores (Major Territories under [Spanish] Sovereignty) remained Spanish, and the Chafarinas Islands, the Peñón de Alhucemas and the Peñón de Vélez de la Gomera, which constitute the three plazas de soberanía menores (Minor Territories under [Spanish] Sovereignty), still forming part of Spain. The Canary Islands, a constituent part of Spain's main territorial subdivisions, are also located in North Africa.

==== Western Sahara ====
Spanish is maintained as a secondary language alongside the official Arabic in the Sahrawi Arab Democratic Republic, a partially recognized state that claims Western Sahara, whose territory formerly comprised the Spanish colony of Spanish Sahara and now is mostly occupied by Morocco. However, Spanish is not a native language in the territory, and the Moroccan government uses Arabic and French in its administration of Western Sahara and the number of Spanish speakers in the territory itself is rather trivial compared to the former two languages.

=== Asia ===
==== Philippines ====
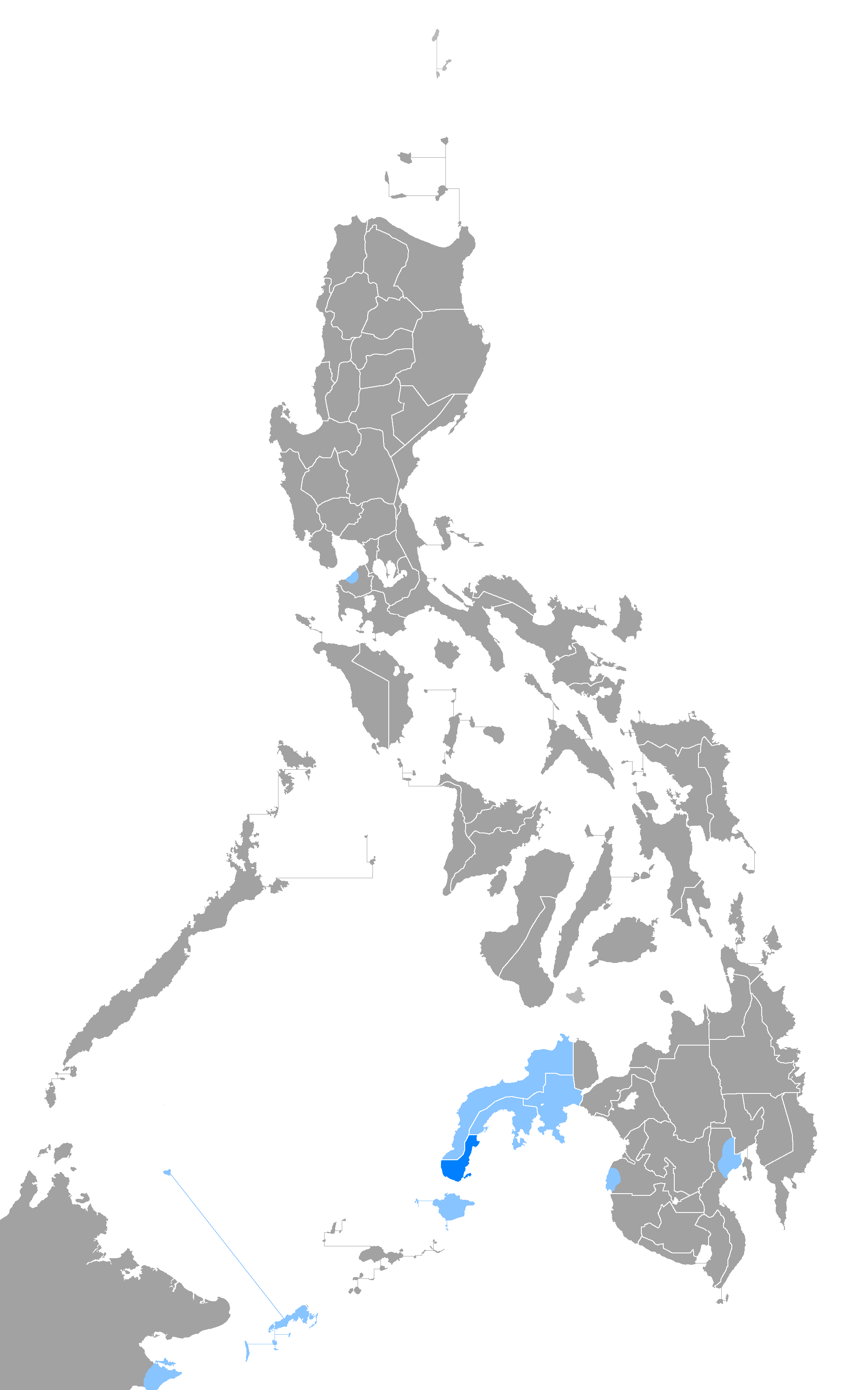
Map of the Chabacano language in Zamboanga in the Philippine Islands

In the Philippines, the Spanish Filipino population which mostly descends from those Spanish colonists who arrived during the Spanish colonial period remains influential in Filipino society despite its small numbers. However, the vast majority of Spanish Filipinos today no longer speak Spanish. Instead, most now exclusively speak Tagalog or other local Philippine languages and English. Nevertheless, the only Spanish-based creole language in Asia called Chavacano was developed on the islands and is spoken by roughly a million people.

Section 7, Article XIV of the 1987 Philippine Constitution specifies Spanish (along with Arabic) a language to "be promoted on a voluntary and optional basis", while the Philippine Academy of the Spanish Language (Spanish: Academia Filipina de la Lengua Española) remains the state regulating body for the language. Castilian Spanish is the sole dialectal standard taught in schools, while Philippine Spanish (the local variant of the language which developed during the colonial era) currently has a few thousand native speakers left and is close to extinction.

Despite its rapid decline in the 20th century, there has been a revival of interest in the Spanish language since the first decade of the 21st century among select circles. Under the rule of President Gloria Macapagal Arroyo (herself a fluent speaker), Spanish was re-introduced into the educational system as an elective language in secondary schools. Nevertheless, the Spanish language's presence in the country and its cultural influence continues to decline and is no longer present in daily life outside the numerous loanwords of Spanish origin in Philippine languages.

=== Pacific Islands ===
==== Easter Island (Rapa Nui) ====
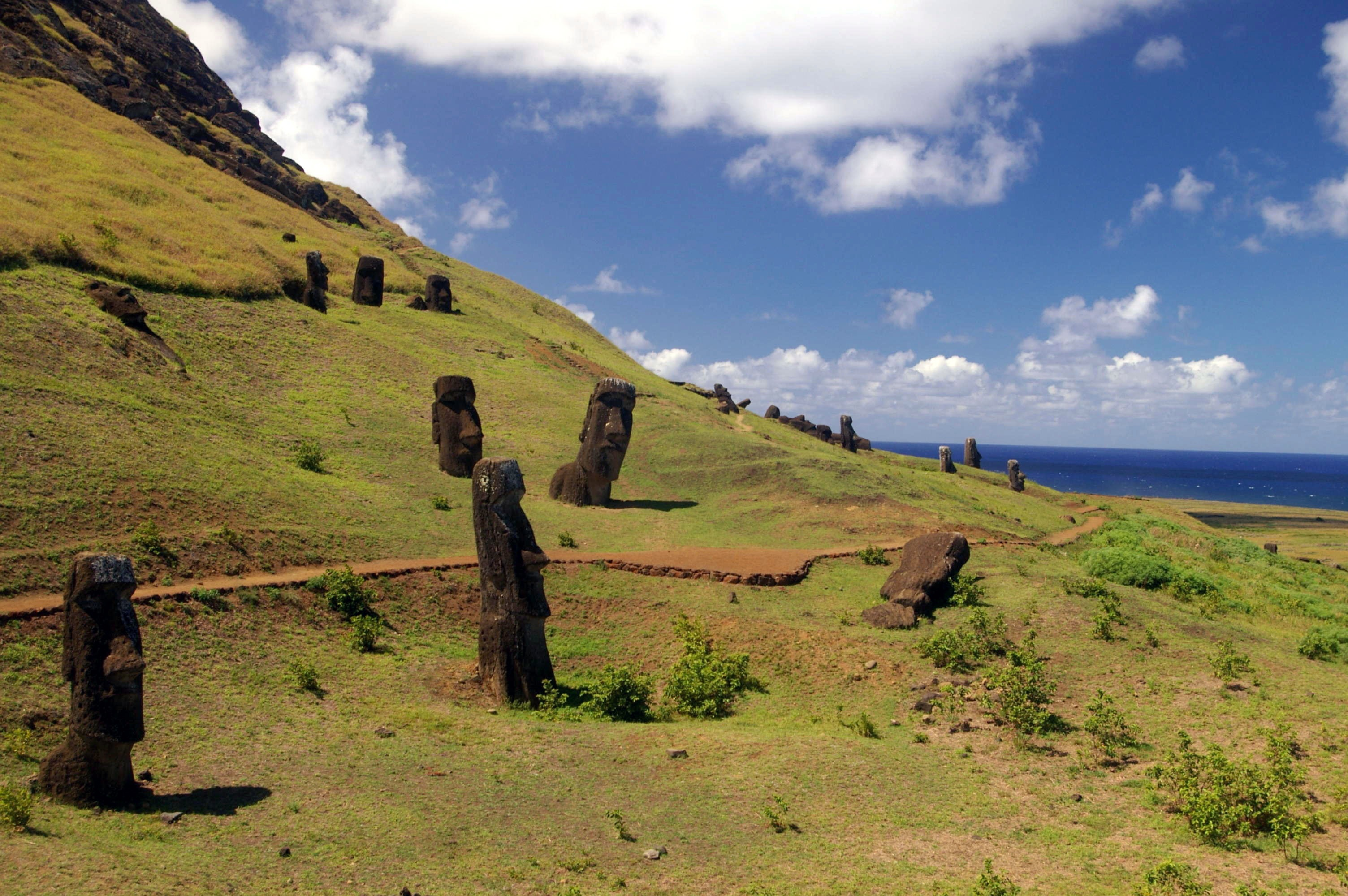
Easter Island, part of Chile, is the only island in Oceania whose official language is Spanish.

Spanish is the official language of Easter Island, a territorial possession of Chile in Polynesia.

==== Mariana Islands ====
The Mariana Islands (today split between the United States territory of Guam and the Commonwealth of the Northern Mariana Islands) were formerly governed as a part of the Spanish East Indies, and thus many Chamorros possess some degree of Spanish admixture.

While most people living on these islands no longer speak Spanish, the native Chamorro language exhibits a noticeable Spanish influence in its vocabulary. Many Chamorros have also preserved Hispanic cultural elements such as fiestas, cockfighting, and the Catholic faith despite having integrated with the American way of life.

Spanish surnames are still prevalent on Guam, it is spoken by Catholic people and Puerto Ricans, and the custom of women keeping their maiden names after marriage is a both byproduct of Spanish culture on these islands as well as the matrilineal structure of indigenous Chamorro culture.

=== Antarctica ===
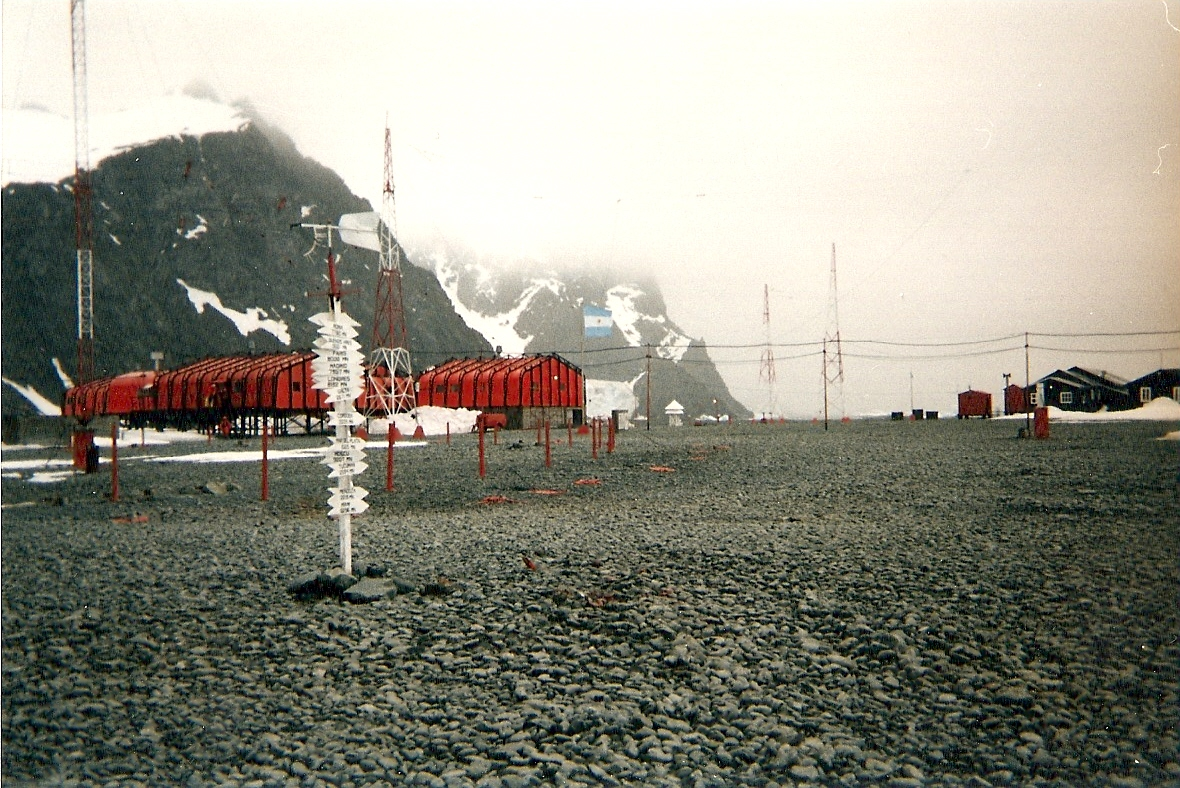
The Orcadas Base, an Argentine scientific station, is the oldest operating Antarctic base and the oldest with a permanent population (since 1907).

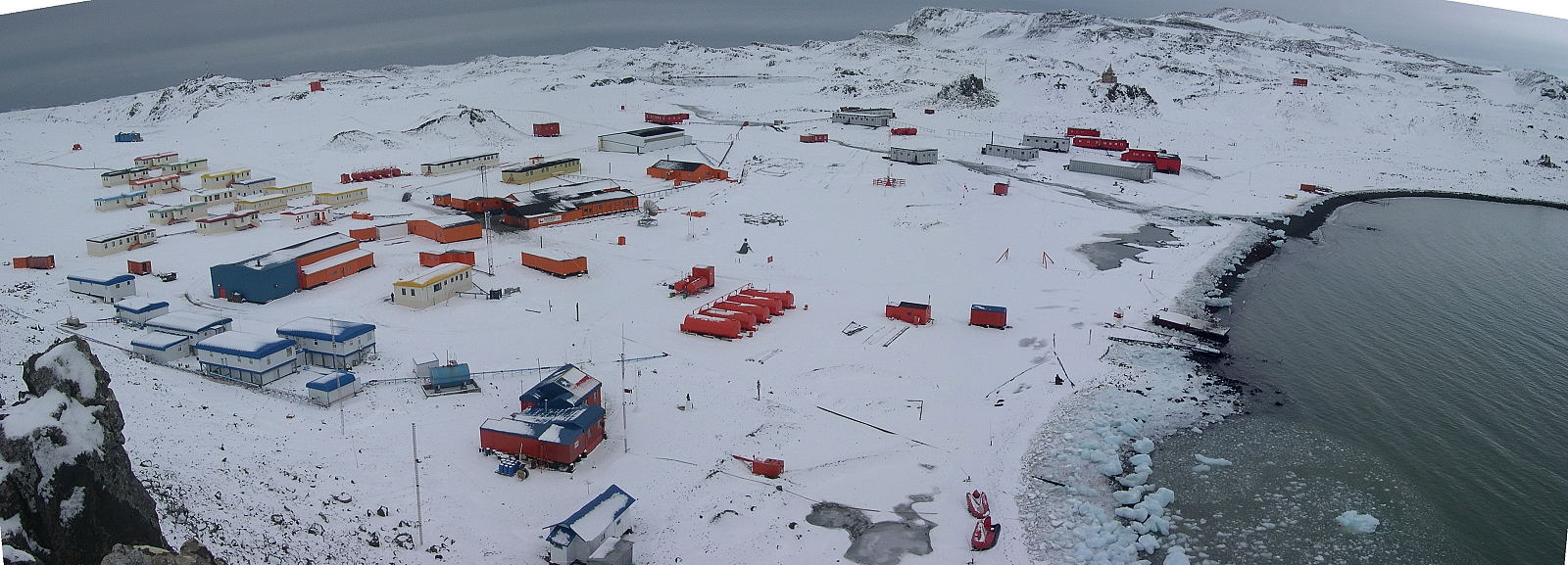
The Chilean nucleus Villa Las Estrellas for the civilian population at the Base Presidente Eduardo Frei Montalva, located on the Fildes Peninsula of King George Island in the South Shetland islands

In Antarctica, there are only two civilian localities and both are inhabited primarily by native Spanish speakers. One of them is the Argentine Fortín Sargento Cabral, which has 66 inhabitants. The other is the Chilean town of Villa Las Estrellas, which has a population of 150 inhabitants in summer and 80 inhabitants in winter. In each of them there is a school where students study and do research in Spanish. The Orcadas Base, an Argentine scientific station, is the oldest base in all of Antarctica still in operation and the oldest with a permanent population (since 1907).

The following countries operate scientific bases in Antarctica:

Country	Permanent Research Stations	Summer Research Stations	Total	Map
Argentina	6	7	13	
Chile	4	5	9	
Uruguay	1	1	2	
Spain	0	2	2	
Peru	0	1	1	
Ecuador	0	1	1	

== Religion ==
The Spanish and the Portuguese took the Christian faith to their colonies in the Americas, Africa, and Asia; Roman Catholicism remains the predominant religion amongst most Hispanics. A significant minority of Spanish speakers are also either Protestant or not affiliated with any religion.

Countries	Population Total	Christians %	Christian Population	Unaffiliated %	Unaffiliated Population	Other religions %	Other religions Population	Source
Argentina	43,830,000	85.4%	37,420,000	12.1%	5,320,000	2.5%	1,090,000	
Bolivia	11,830,000	94.0%	11,120,000	4.1%	480,000	1.9%	230,000	
Chile	18,540,000	88.3%	16,380,000	9.7%	1,800,000	2.0%	360,000	
Colombia	52,160,000	92.3%	48,150,000	6.7%	3,510,000	1.0%	500,000	
Costa Rica	5,270,000	90.8%	4,780,000	8.0%	420,000	1.2%	70,000	
Cuba	11,230,000	58.9%	6,610,000	23.2%	2,600,000	17.9%	2,020,000	
Dominican Republic	11,280,000	88.0%	9,930,000	10.9%	1,230,000	1.1%	120,000	
Ecuador	16,480,000	94.0%	15,490,000	5.6%	920,000	0.4%	70,000	
El Salvador	6,670,000	88.0%	5,870,000	11.2%	740,000	0.8%	60,000	
Equatorial Guinea	860,000	88.7%	770,000	5.0%	40,000	6.3%	50,000	
Guatemala	18,210,000	95.3%	17,360,000	3.9%	720,000	0.8%	130,000	
Honduras	9,090,000	87.5%	7,950,000	10.5%	950,000	2.0%	190,000	
Mexico	126,010,000	94.1%	118,570,000	5.7%	7,240,000	0.2%	200,000	
Nicaragua	6,690,000	85.3%	5,710,000	13.0%	870,000	1.7%	110,000	
Panama	4,020,000	92.7%	3,720,000	5.0%	200,000	2.3%	100,000	
Paraguay	7,630,000	96.9%	7,390,000	1.1%	90,000	2.0%	150,000	
Peru	32,920,000	95.4%	31,420,000	3.1%	1,010,000	1.5%	490,000	
Philippines	109,035,343	92.4%	102,794,183	0.1%	111,249	5.8%	6,452,448	
Puerto Rico (Note: Note: Puerto Rico is a territory of the United States.)	3,790,000	90.5%	3,660,000	7.3%	80,000	2.2%	40,000	
Spain	48,400,000	75.2%	34,410,000	21.0%	10,190,000	3.8%	1,800,000	
United States	333,287,557	63.0%	209,971,161	29.0%	96,653,392	8.0%	26,663,005	
Uruguay	3,490,000	57.0%	1,990,000	41.5%	1,450,000	1.5%	50,000	
Venezuela	33,010,000	89.5%	29,540,000	9.7%	3,220,000	0.8%	250,000	

== See also ==
- List of countries and territories where Spanish is an official language
- Spanish-based creole languages
- Flag of the Hispanic People
- Hispanic
- Hispanicity
- Hispanism and Panhispanism
- Hispanophobia
- Latino
- Language geography and Sprachraum
- Lingua franca and World language
- Anglophone, Francophone, Lusophone, the corresponding words relating to use of the English, French, and Portuguese languages, respectively
- List of link languages
- Dialect continuum
- Geolinguistics
- Language geography

== Notes ==
By ISO 639-3 code
Enter an ISO code to find the corresponding language article.
