= Hispanic America =

Predominantly Spanish-speaking countries of North and South America

- Area: 11,485,417 km^{2} (4,434,544 sq mi)
- Population: 427,122,274
- Population density: 37.19/km^{2} (96.3/sq mi)
- Demonym: Hispanic American
- Countries: 18: Argentina; Bolivia; Chile; Colombia; Costa Rica; Cuba; Dominican Republic; Ecuador; El Salvador; Guatemala; Honduras; Mexico; Nicaragua; Panama; Paraguay; Peru; Uruguay; Venezuela
- Dependencies: Puerto Rico (Note: Territory of the United States.)
- Languages: Spanish and Indigenous languages of the Americas
- Time zone: UTC−03:00 to UTC−08:00
- Largest cities: Largest urban areas: 1. Mexico City; 2. Buenos Aires; 3. Bogotá; 4. Lima; 5. Santiago; 6. Guadalajara; 7. Caracas; 8. Guatemala City; 9. Monterrey; 10. Medellín

Hispanic America (Spanish: Hispanoamérica or América Hispana), refers to the Spanish territories in the Americas, historically known as Spanish America (Spanish: América Española) or Castilian America (Spanish: América Castellana), part of the Spanish overseas territories officially known as "the Indies" (Sp. las Indias), and consisting of the modern Spanish-speaking countries of the Americas that are its successor states or inheritors of its territory. In all of these countries, Spanish is the main language—sometimes sharing official status with one or more indigenous languages (such as Guaraní, Quechua, Aymara or Mayan) or English (in Puerto Rico), and Latin Catholicism is the predominant religion.

Hispanic America is sometimes grouped together with Brazil under the term Ibero-America, meaning those countries in the Americas with cultural roots in the Iberian Peninsula. (Note: The adjective "Ibero-American" usually refers only to countries of the Western Hemisphere, but in the title of the Organization of Ibero-American States it refers to Iberian and (Ibero-)American countries, plus Equatorial Guinea.) Hispanic America also contrasts with Latin America, which includes not only Hispanic America, but also Brazil (the former Portuguese America), and by a few definitions, the former French colonies in the Western Hemisphere (areas that are now in either the United States or Canada are usually excluded).

== History ==
The Spanish conquest of the Americas began in 1492, up until 1531, during the reign of the catholic crown King Fernando V and Queen Isabella. Christopher Columbus landed in the Caribbean islands during one of his expeditions with the Spanish crew looking for Asia. Once established in the "New World" the desire of the Spaniards to acquire wealth quickly developed into conquest, the idea of goods and wealth drew more Spaniards' attention to the new land. Conquerors like Hernan Cortes motivated the Spanish to conquer lands and establish their living in this 'New World' and ultimately was part of a larger historical process of world discovery, through which various European powers colonized a considerable amount of territory and peoples in the Americas, Asia, and Africa between the 15th and 20th centuries. Hispanic America became the main part of the vast Spanish Empire. Napoleon's intervention in Spain in 1808 and the consequent chaos initiated the dismemberment of the Spanish Empire, as the Hispanic American territories began their struggle for emancipation. By 1830, the only remaining Spanish American territories were the islands of Cuba and Puerto Rico, until the 1898 Spanish–American War.

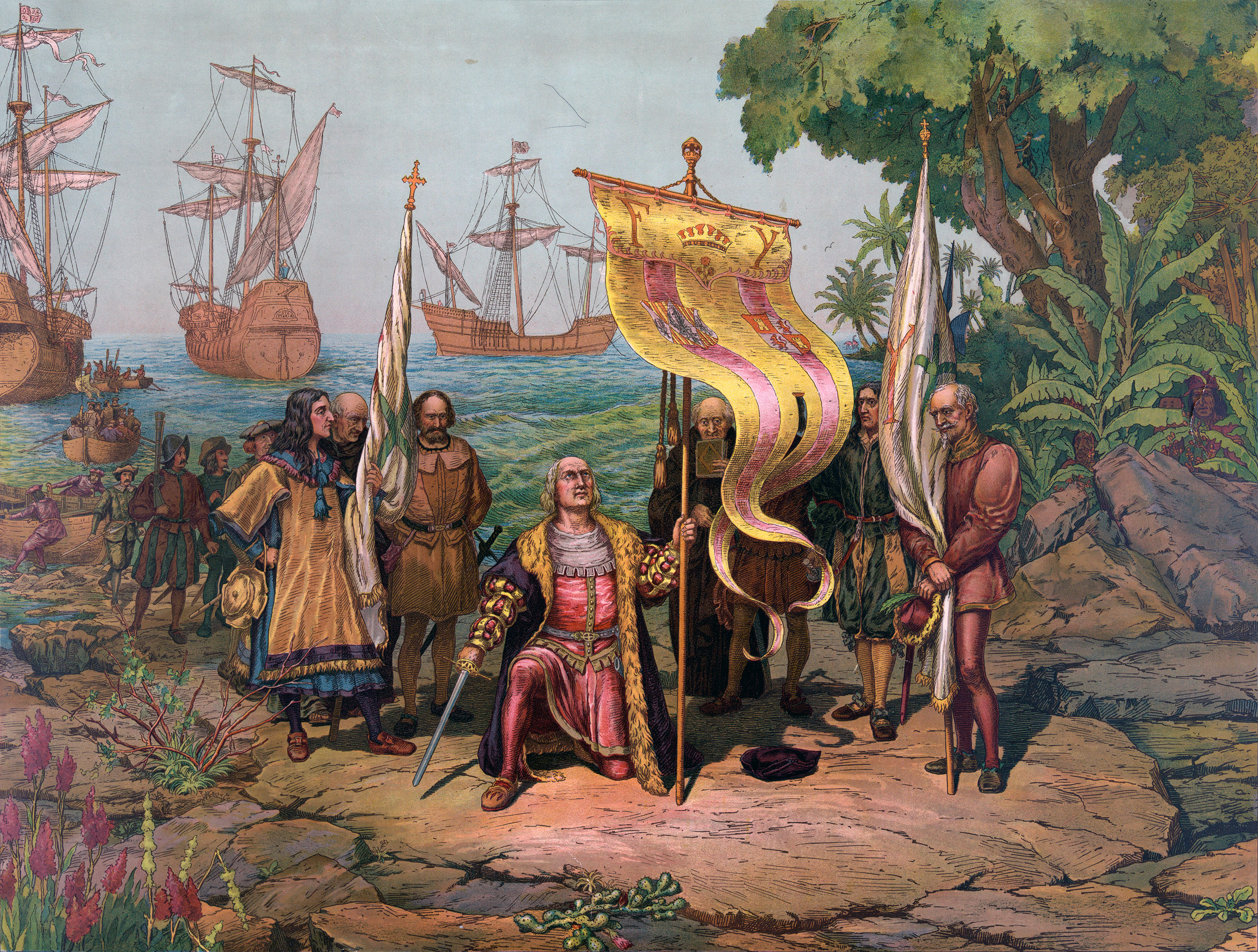
Image of Christopher Columbus' arrival to the Caribbean Islands.

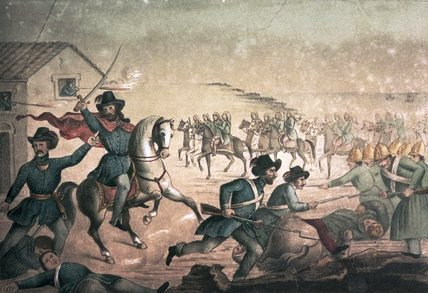
The Battle of San Antonio, for the independence of Uruguay.

== Impact ==
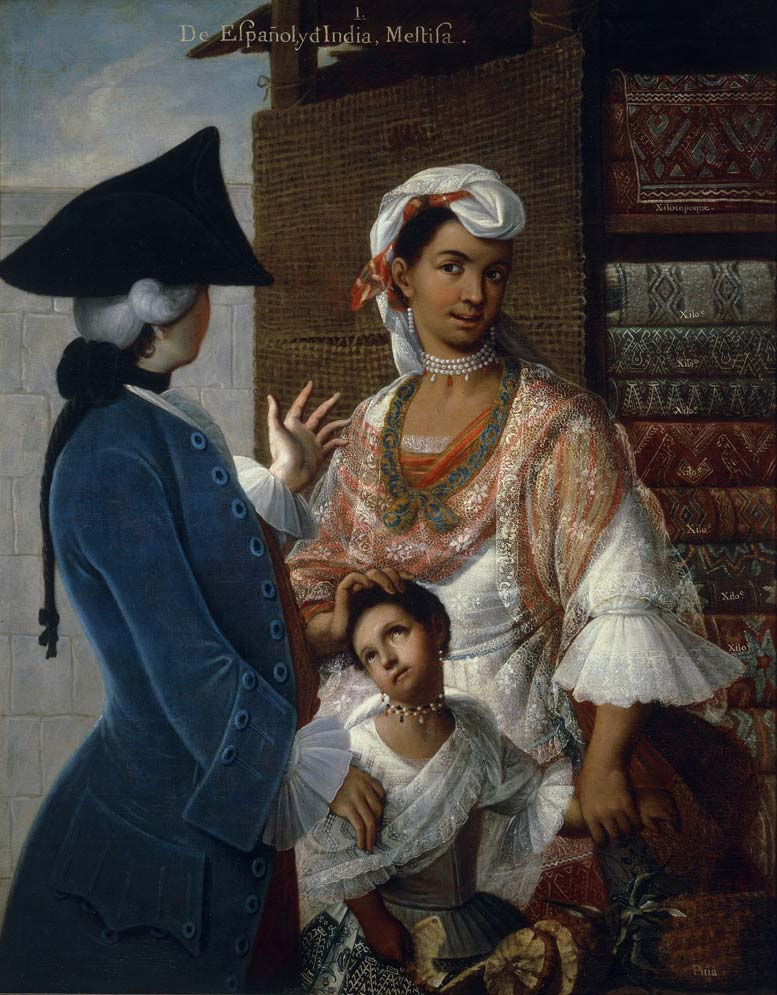
This image shows a 'Mestiza' child as she is a mixture of a European man and an Amerindian woman.

In general, Spanish colonies allowed mostly flexibility as long as people followed specific obligations and respected hierarchies and within these limits, Hispanic Americans were able to negotiate certain aspects of their living. In the early 1540s, once most of the territories were conquered, a lot of Spanish established themselves there for a living, and they also brought with them many African slaves and even free Africans to build on the economy of the 'New World'. They created two separate Republics; Republica de Españoles and Republica de Indios. One was composed of the Spanish and their African slaves, and the other was composed of indigenous peoples.

There are theories that there were various Republics, others say there were none, however, these two existed and inside the Republica de Indios there were lots of villages that created their own too. Both 'Republica de Indios' and 'Republica de Españoles' lived apart from each other but did not have problems between them, it was just a way to separate hierarchies due to race and ethnicity. Spaniards created this separation as a similar government behaviour as the one back in their country, where only the top of the hierarchy didn't work or pay. In this case, the 'Republica de Españoles' was the top of the hierarchy and most took advantage of it to gain wealth without working just because of their ethnicity. Later on, in the later 1550s the Spaniards would send some churchmen and officials to incorporate into the 'Republica de Indios' so that Christianity remained regardless of the ethnicity.

This idea of the two republics isolated the Hispanic people due to their race. It gave Spanish people wealth and power only because of their ethnicity, generating a social hierarchy that left Hispanic Americans in the lowest position at the level of the African slaves Spanish brought with them through the Atlantic slave trade, and them in the highest position. Spanish were always considered at the top of the hierarchy and both Indigenous Americans and Africans at the bottom. However, sexual relations between these groups developed into mixed raced populations called Castas. This partially threatened the hierarchy, but the Spanish maintained themselves at the top and maintained Hispanic Americans and Africans at the bottom, while allowing Castas to position themselves somewhere in the middle. However, people were often judged and categorised by their level of Spanish, their clothing and their diet as well as their relationship circles. This system entrenched racial inequalities that persisted long after the colonial period.

The independence of Hispanic American countries consisted mainly between 1808 and 1826, and was a fruit of the Spanish elites fighting for their territory as they saw an opportunity after the Spanish Independence War (1808-1814) against Napoleon. The wars for territories consisted of many battles that were generally violent but ended up being effective for the new local bourgeoisie to gain their independence. However, it took long for some of the countries to re-establish economic stability in their territories since most of the wealth had been acquired by the Spanish and was no longer there.

== Demographics ==
=== Countries and territories ===
Country or territory	Population	Area (km^{2})	GDP (nominal [USD, billions])	GDP (nominal [USD]) per capita	GDP (PPP)	GDP (PPP) per capita
Argentina	46,376,763	2,780,400	688.378	14,356.62	12,45.01	26,390.44
Bolivia	11,673,029	1,098,581	80.743	6,333.163	125.06	10,340.32
Chile	19,116,209	756,102	407.85	20,239.76	517.53	29,928.25
Colombia	52,882,884	1,141,748	539.53	10,103.71	1042.26	19,770.18
Costa Rica	5,094,114	51,180	109.931	20,299.19	141.09	26,866.67
Cuba	11,326,616	110,860	147.79	13,270.00	254.80	22,300.00
Dominican Republic	11,847,904	48,670	136.148	12,405.59	294.96	27,230.14
Ecuador	17,643,060	283,561	138.194	7,574.859	268.19	14,485.60
El Salvador	6,486,201	21,041	39.838	6,195.805	75.95	11,700.78
Guatemala	16,858,333	108,889	128.886	6,810.252	214.57	10,948.04
Honduras	9,904,608	112,492	41.505	3,710.883	75.65	7,198.47
Mexico	128,932,753	1,972,550	2,120.855	15,779.32	3,413.80	25,966.32
Nicaragua	6,624,554	130,373	24.227	3,558.807	51.96	7,648.20
Panama	4,314,768	75,320	95.024	20,563.59	190.81	42,788.36
Paraguay	7,132,530	406,752	60.542	9,371.612	124.93	20,054.20
Peru	32,971,846	1,285,216	380.9	10,960.18	566.26	16,684.88
Puerto Rico	3,075,871	9,100	129.012	40,650.06	132.27	41,942.78
Uruguay	3,473,727	176,215	96.092	27,608.01	108.17	30,474.28
Venezuela	28,435,943	916,447	111.303	4,139.656	212.74	7,978.27
Total	412,323,809	11,485,417	5,328.958	13,370.05883	9,056.09	21,963.53

=== Largest cities ===
City	Country	Population	Metro
Mexico City	Mexico	9,209,944	21,804,515
Buenos Aires	Argentina	3,054,300	12,806,866
Bogotá	Colombia	7,963,734	12,545,272
Lima	Peru	8,894,000	9,569,468
Santiago	Chile	5,428,590	7,112,000
Guadalajara	Mexico	1,385,621	5,286,642
Caracas	Venezuela	3,273,863	5,239,364
Guatemala City	Guatemala	2,149,188	4,500,000
Monterrey	Mexico	1,133,814	4,106,054
Medellín	Colombia	2,636,101	3,731,447
Quito	Ecuador	2,011,388	3,156,182
Guayaquil	Ecuador	2,698,077	3,113,725
Havana	Cuba	2,350,000	3,073,000
Maracaibo	Venezuela	2,201,727	2,928,043
Santo Domingo	Dominican Republic	965,040	2,908,607
Puebla	Mexico	1,399,519	2,728,790
Asunción	Paraguay	525,294	2,698,401
Cali	Colombia	2,068,386	2,530,796
San Juan	Puerto Rico (Note: Note: Puerto Rico is a territory of the United States.)	434,374	2,509,007
San Salvador	El Salvador	540,090	2,223,092
San José	Costa Rica	1,543,000	2,158,898
Toluca	Mexico	820,000	1,936,422
Montevideo	Uruguay	1,325,968	1,868,335
Managua	Nicaragua	1,380,300	1,825,000
Barranquilla	Colombia	1,148,506	1,798,143
Santa Cruz	Bolivia	1,594,926	1,774,998
Valencia	Venezuela	894,204	1,770,000
Tijuana	Mexico	1,286,157	1,751,302
Tegucigalpa	Honduras	1,230,000	1,600,000
La Paz	Bolivia	872,480	1,590,000
Panama City	Panama	990,641	1,500,000
Barquisimeto	Venezuela	1,116,000	1,500,000
León	Mexico	1,278,087	1,488,000
Córdoba	Argentina	1,309,536	1,452,000
Ciudad Juárez	Mexico	1,301,452	1,343,000
San Pedro Sula	Honduras	1,250,000	1,300,000
Maracay	Venezuela	1,007,000	1,300,000
Rosario	Argentina	908,163	1,203,000
Torreón	Mexico	548,723	1,144,000
Bucaramanga	Colombia	516,512	1,055,331

=== Ethnology ===
The population of the Hispanic America is made up of the descendants of three large racial groups and their combinations:

• The Indigenous peoples of the Americas, descendants of Incas, Aztecs, Mayan, Taíno and others.

• Those of European ancestry, mainly Spanish and Italian.

• Africans who were brought over to Hispanic America during the Slave Trade.

Unlike in the United States, there were no anti-miscegenation policies in Latin America. Though still a racially stratified society there were no significant barriers to gene flow between the three populations. As a result, admixture profiles are a reflection of the colonial populations of Amerindians, Europeans and Africans. The pattern is also sex biased in that the Amerindian and African maternal lines are found in significantly higher proportions than Amerindian or African Y chromosomal lines. This is an indication that the primary mating pattern was that of European males with Amerindian or African females. According to the study, half the White populations of the Latin American countries studied have some degree of either Indigenous American or African admixture (MtDNA or Y chromosome). In countries such as Chile and Colombia almost the entire white population was shown to have some non-European admixture.

Frank Moya Pons, a Dominican historian documented that Spanish colonists intermarried with Taíno women, and, over time, these mestizo descendants intermarried with Africans, creating a tri-racial Creole culture. 1514 census records reveal that 40% of Spanish men in the colony of Santo Domingo had Taíno wives.

The most common combinations are:

• Mestizos, those of mixed ancestry.

Flag Map of Hispanic America

Ethnic distribution, in 2005 - Population estimates, as of 2020
Country	Population	Mestizos	Whites	Others
Argentina	45,376,763	32.0%	79.0%	5.0%
Bolivia	11,673,029	50.0%	1.0%	49.0%
Chile	19,116,209	35.0%	60.0%	5.0%
Colombia	50,882,884	52.0%	32.0%	16.0%
Costa Rica	5,094,114	45.0%	50.0%	5.0%
Cuba	11,326,616	34.0%	50.0%	16.0%
Dominican Republic	10,847,904	65.0%	24.0%	11.0%
Ecuador	17,643,060	77.0%	8.0%	15.0%
El Salvador	6,486,201	86.0%	13.0%	1.0%
Guatemala	16,858,333	60.0%	1.0%	39.0%
Honduras	9,904,608	90.0%	2.0%	8.0%
Mexico	128,932,753	51.0%	40.0%	9.0%
Nicaragua	6,624,554	70.0%	16.0%	14.0%
Panama	4,314,768	69.0%	17.0%	14.0%
Paraguay	7,132,530	94.0%	5.0%	1.0%
Peru	32,971,846	50.0%	3.0%	47.0%
Uruguay	3,473,727	23.0%	86.0%	7.0%
Venezuela	28,435,943	53.0%	32.0%	15.0%
Total	420,289,876	50.0%	33.0%	17.0%

=== Languages ===
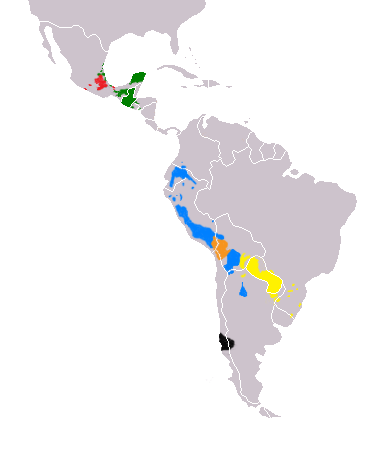
Quechua Guarani Aymara Nahuatl Mayan languages Mapudungun

Spanish is the official language in most Hispanic American countries, and it is spoken by the vast majority of the population. Indigenous American languages are widely spoken in Chile, Peru, Guatemala, Bolivia, Paraguay and Mexico, and to a lesser degree, in Panama, Ecuador, Colombia and Venezuela. In some Hispanic American countries, the population of speakers of indigenous languages tends to be very small or even non-existent (e.g. Uruguay). Mexico contains the largest variety of indigenous languages; there, the most spoken native language is Nahuatl.

In Peru, Quechua is an official language, alongside Spanish and any other indigenous language in the areas where they predominate. In Ecuador, while holding no official status, the closely related Quichua is a recognized language of the indigenous people under the country's constitution; however, it is only spoken by a few groups in the country's highlands. In Bolivia, Aymara, Quechua and Guaraní hold official status alongside Spanish. Guaraní, along with Spanish, is an official language of Paraguay, and is spoken by a majority of the population (who are, for the most part, bilingual), and it is co-official with Spanish in the Argentine province of Corrientes. In Nicaragua, Spanish is the official language, but on the country's Caribbean coast English and indigenous languages such as Miskito, Sumo, and Rama also hold official status. Colombia recognizes all indigenous languages spoken within its territory as official, though fewer than 1% of its population are native speakers of these languages. Nahuatl is one of the 62 native languages spoken by indigenous people in Mexico, which are officially recognized by the government as "national languages" along with Spanish.

Other European languages spoken in Hispanic America include: English, by some groups in Puerto Rico and descendants of British settlers in Argentina and Chile; German, in southern Chile and portions of Argentina, Venezuela, and Paraguay; Italian, in Argentina, Venezuela, and Uruguay; Ukrainian, Polish, and Russian in Argentina; and Welsh, in southern Argentina. Yiddish and Hebrew can be heard around Buenos Aires. Non-European or Asian languages include Japanese in Peru, Bolivia, and Paraguay; Korean in Argentina and Paraguay; Arabic in Argentina, Colombia, Venezuela, and Chile; and Chinese throughout South America.

In several nations, especially in the Caribbean region, creole languages are spoken. Creole languages of mainland Latin America, similarly, are derived from European languages and various African tongues.

The Garifuna language is spoken along the Caribbean coast in Honduras, Guatemala, and Nicaragua mostly by the Garifuna people a mixed race Zambo people who were the result of mixing between Indigenous Caribbeans and escaped Black slaves. Primarily an Arawakan language, it has influences from Caribbean and European languages.

=== Religion ===
The Spanish and the Portuguese took the Latin Catholic faith to their colonies in the Americas, Asia and Africa; Roman Catholicism remains the predominant religion amongst most Hispanic Americans. Membership in Protestant denominations is increasing, particularly in Guatemala, El Salvador, Honduras, Nicaragua, Puerto Rico and other countries. In particular, Pentecostalism has experienced massive growth. This movement is increasingly attracting Latin America's middle classes. Anglicanism also has a long and growing presence in Latin America.

Countries	Population Total	Christians %	Christian Population	Unaffiliated %	Unaffiliated Population	Other religions %	Other religions Population	Source
Argentina	43,830,000	85.4%	37,420,000	12.1%	5,320,000	2.5%	1,090,000	
Bolivia	11,830,000	94.0%	11,120,000	4.1%	480,000	1.9%	230,000	
Chile	18,540,000	88.3%	16,380,000	9.7%	1,800,000	2.0%	360,000	
Colombia	52,160,000	92.3%	48,150,000	6.7%	3,510,000	1.0%	500,000	
Costa Rica	5,270,000	90.8%	4,780,000	8.0%	420,000	1.2%	70,000	
Cuba	11,230,000	58.9%	6,610,000	23.2%	2,600,000	17.9%	2,020,000	
Dominican Republic	11,280,000	88.0%	9,930,000	10.9%	1,230,000	1.1%	120,000	
Ecuador	16,480,000	94.0%	15,490,000	5.6%	920,000	0.4%	70,000	
El Salvador	6,670,000	88.0%	5,870,000	11.2%	740,000	0.8%	60,000	
Guatemala	18,210,000	95.3%	17,360,000	3.9%	720,000	0.8%	130,000	
Honduras	9,090,000	87.5%	7,950,000	10.5%	950,000	2.0%	190,000	
Mexico	126,010,000	94.1%	118,570,000	5.7%	7,240,000	0.2%	200,000	
Nicaragua	6,690,000	85.3%	5,710,000	13.0%	870,000	1.7%	110,000	
Panama	4,020,000	92.7%	3,720,000	5.0%	200,000	2.3%	100,000	
Paraguay	7,630,000	96.9%	7,390,000	1.1%	90,000	2.0%	150,000	
Peru	32,920,000	95.4%	31,420,000	3.1%	1,010,000	1.5%	490,000	
Puerto Rico (Note: Note: Puerto Rico is a territory of the United States.)	3,790,000	90.5%	3,660,000	7.3%	80,000	2.2%	40,000	
Uruguay	3,490,000	57.0%	1,990,000	41.5%	1,450,000	1.5%	50,000	
Venezuela	33,010,000	89.5%	29,540,000	9.7%	3,220,000	0.8%	250,000	

== Culture ==
=== Cuisine ===
Hispanic cuisine as the term is applied in the Western Hemisphere, is a misnomer. What is usually considered Hispanic cuisine in the United States is mostly Mexican and Central American cuisine. Mexican cuisine is composed of mainly indigenous—Aztec and Mayan—and Spanish influences.

Mexican cuisine is considered intangible cultural heritage by UNESCO and can be found all over the United States.

In the United States, with its growing Hispanic population, food staples from Mexican cuisine and the cuisine from other Hispanic countries have become widely available. Over the years, the blending of these cuisines has produced unique American forms such as Tex-Mex cuisine. This cuisine, which originated in Texas, is based on maize products, heavily spiced ground beef, cheese and tomato sauces with chilies. This cuisine is widely available not just in the United States but across other countries, where American exports are found. In Florida, Cuban food is widely available. All of these Hispanic foods in the United States have evolved in character as they have been commercially americanized by large restaurant chains and food companies.

The cuisine of Spain has many regional varieties, with Mediterranean flavors based on olive oil, garlic, and tomatoes and due to its long Atlantic and Mediterranean coastlines, has been graced with a great variety and availability of seafood. In the inland communities of Spain, there is a long tradition of cured meat of different kinds, in addition to an abundance of dishes such as roasts and stews, based on beef, pork, lamb, and poultry. The European and Arab heritage of Spain is reflected in its food, along with cosmopolitan influences beginning in the many new ingredients brought in from the New World since the 16th century, e.g. tomatoes, potatoes, or chocolate, and the more modern tastes introduced from Europe since the 19th century, especially through French and Italian dishes. It is only in the last ten years that Hispanic American dishes have been introduced in Spain. In the United States and Canada, the number of Hispanic restaurants has become a growing trend, following the tapas-style restaurants fashion that first appeared in North America in the 1990s.

Cuban, Dominican, and Puerto Rican cuisines, on the other hand, tend to use a lot of pork and can depend heavily on starchy root vegetables, plantain, and rice. The most prominent influences on their Spanish culinary traditions were introduced by African slaves, and to a lesser degree, French influence from Haiti and later Chinese immigrants. The use of spicy chile peppers of varying degrees of strength used as flavour enhancers in Mexican tradition is practically unknown in traditional Spanish–Caribbean dishes. The cuisine of Haiti, a country with a Francophone majority, is very similar to its regional neighbors in terms of influences and ingredients used.

The Argentine diet is heavily influenced by the country's position as one of the world's largest beef and wine producers, and by the impact that European immigration had on its national culture. Grilled meats are a staple of most meals as are pastas, potatoes, rice, paella and a variety of vegetables (Argentina is a huge exporter of agricultural products). Italian influence is also seen in the form of pizza and ice cream, both of which are integral components of national cuisine.

Uruguayan cuisine is similar to that of Argentina, though seafood is much more dominant in this coastal nation. As another one of the world's largest producers, wine is as much a staple drink to Uruguayans as beer is to Germans.

In Colombia, Ecuador, Peru and Chile, potato dishes are typical since the potato is originally from this region. Beef and chicken are common sources of meat. In the Highlands is the cuy, a South American name for guinea pig, a common meat. Given the coastal location, both countries have extensive fishing fleets, which provide a wealth of seafood options, including the signature South American dish, ceviche. While potato is an important ingredient in the Highlands, Rice is the main side dish on the coast.

This diversity in staples and cuisine is also evident in the differing regional cuisines within the national borders of the individual countries.

=== Symbols ===
==== Flag ====
Flag of Hispanic Heritage. Motto: Justicia, Paz, Unión y Fraternidad ("Justice, Peace, Union and Fraternity").

While relatively unknown, there is a flag representing the countries of Spanish America, its people, history and shared cultural legacy.

It was created in October 1933 by Ángel Camblor, captain of the Uruguayan army. It was adopted by all the states of Spanish America during the Pan-American Conference of the same year in Montevideo, Uruguay.

The white background stands for peace, while the Inti sun god of Inca mythology symbolizes the light shining on the Americas, and the three crosses represent Christopher Columbus' caravels, the Niña, Pinta, and Santa María, used in his first voyage from Spain to the New World in 1492. The deep lilac color of the crosses evokes the color of the lion on the coat of arms of the medieval Crown of Castile.

== See also ==
- Hispanic
- Hispanic and Latino Americans (Hispanic, Latino)
- Hispanidad
- Hispanism and Pan-Hispanism
- Hispanophone
- Portuguese America / Lusitanic America
- Ibero-America
- Latin America (Latin Americans)
- Louisiana (Isleños)
- Florida (Floridanos)
- Spanish language
- Spanish language in the Americas
- Spanish language in the Philippines
- Philippines
- Spanish-language literature
