= Francisco Coello de Portugal y Quesada =

Spanish cartographer

Francisco Coello y Quesada
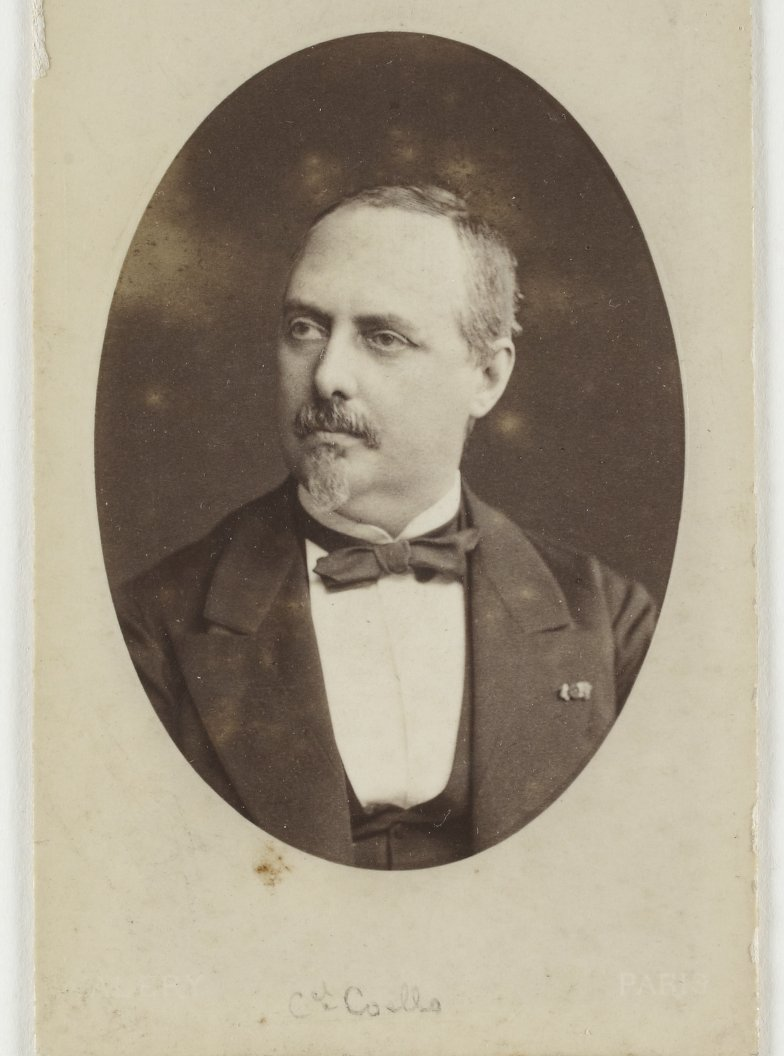
- Born: 1822-04-26; Jaén, Spain
- Died: 1898-09-30; Madrid, Spain
- Resting place: Cemetery of San Justo
- Occupations: Military engineer and cartographer

Francisco Coello de Portugal y Quesada (Jaén, April 26, 1822 - Madrid, September 30, 1898) was a Spanish cartographer and military man. Author of Atlas de España y sus posesiones de Ultramar, his most important work, he was a member of the Royal Academy of History, the Royal Society of Geography and the General Board of Statistics, in which he participated in the planning of a general cadastre for Spain. He also held the title of Knight of the Order of San Fernando and the Cross of Military Merit. He was one of the most outstanding cartographers in Spain in the 19th century. He retired from the Army with the rank of colonel.

== Biography ==
=== Early years ===
Son of Diego Coello de Portugal y García del Castillo and Josefa Quesada y Vial, he had seven siblings, among them Diego Coello de Portugal y Quesada, who would become Spanish ambassador in Rome. Between 1836 and 1839, he studied at the Academy of Military Engineering of Guadalajara, after which he would obtain the rank of lieutenant. In 1840, he participated in the final stages of the First Carlist War, in the Maestrazgo region, on the side of General Espartero; his performance was rewarded with the awarding of the Cross of San Fernando in 1841. At the end of the war, he began his collaboration as a cartographer with Pascual Madoz. However, this was interrupted in 1844, after Coello left for Algeria as military attaché of the French army, where he would remain for two years. It is said that it could be this stay in Africa that instilled and strengthened in him his interest in cartography, and thanks to it, he also elaborated an atlas with thirty maps of Tunisia and Algeria.

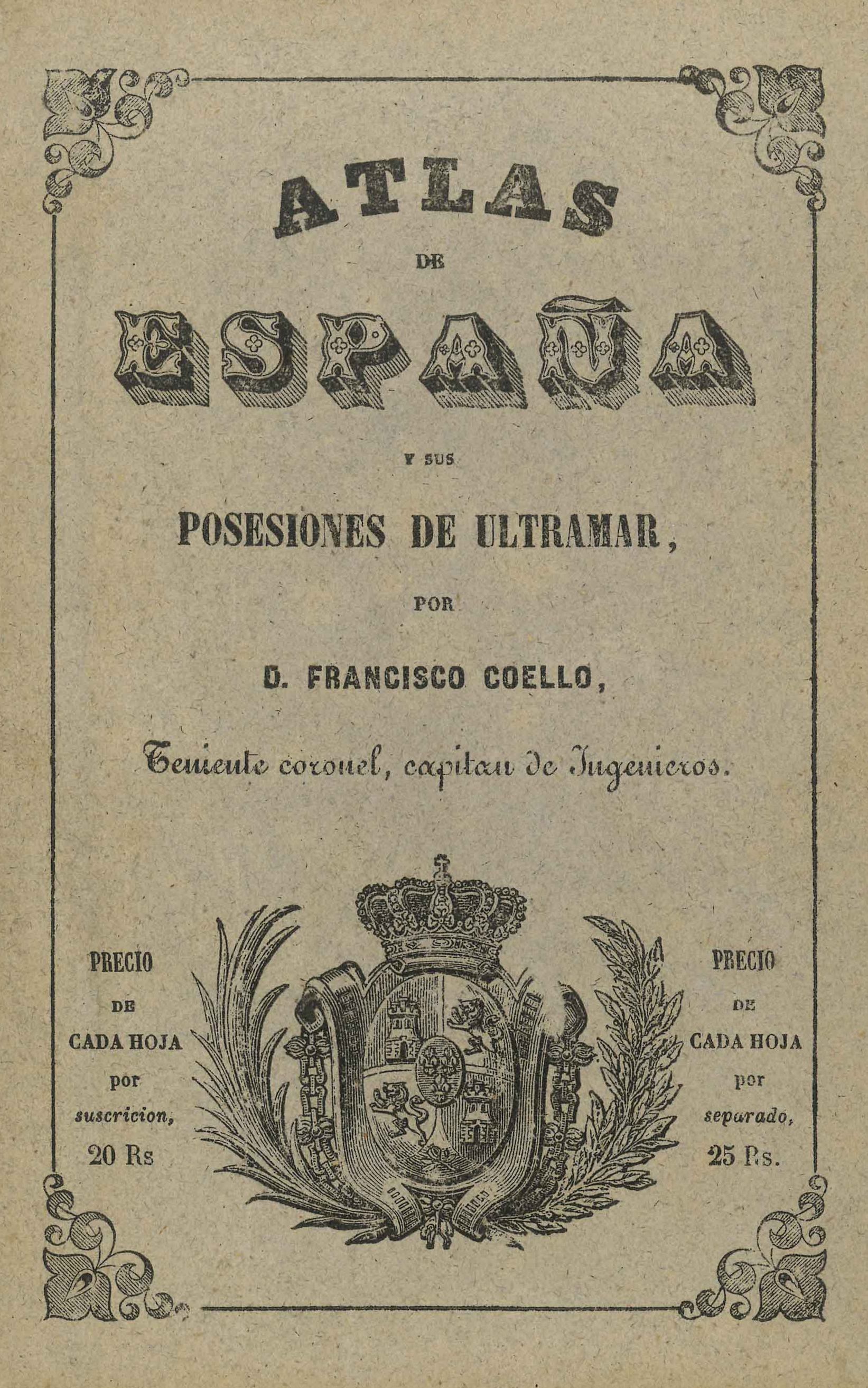
Cover of the Atlas de España y sus posesiones de Ultramar, his magnum opus.

=== Atlas de España y sus posesiones de Ultramar ===
Upon his return from Africa, he continued to work closely with Pascual Madoz and his famous Diccionario geográfico-estadístico-histórico de España y sus posesiones de Ultramar, in which Coello was in charge of the cartography. His work was published in a separate book, entitled Atlas de España y sus posesiones de Ultramar (in English: Atlas of Spain and its Overseas Possessions), which included maps of all the provinces of Spain at a scale of 1:200,000, except for the Canary Islands, for which a scale of 1:280,000 was chosen. Specifically, in 1847, Francisco Coello and Pascual Madoz made a request to the City Council of Madrid for the cartographic base of a map of the city to scale 1:1,250, which was finished in 1846 by the road engineers Merlo, Gutiérrez and Ribera — a project directed by Mesonero Romanos — to add it to the Atlas, in which they would include it finally with a scale 1:5,000, in 1849. This map was later designated by the City Council of Madrid as "Plano Oficial de la Villa" (Official Map of the City). The Atlas was the first work to reflect the new territorial division of the country in 1833.

The intended format of each provincial map was 100 x 75 cm, with a total of 65 sheets. However, the project was not completed and the maps of eleven provinces were not produced, although maps of Spanish Africa and various overseas possessions were made. The sheets had a provincial map, which was the base of the document, small plans on a smaller scale of different cities of the province, which were displayed on the sides of the sheets, and small textual annotations included by Madoz. The procedure carried out in the elaboration of the maps consisted of the drawing of the sheets by Coello and a later engraving with burin on steel plate, to the detriment of the use of lithographic techniques, which he did use occasionally in his other works of lesser importance. Finally, the plate was inked and printed on paper. The publication of the sheets was individual, as they were finished, and took place between 1847 and 1870, with 1851 and 1852 being the most prolific years in terms of publication of sheets, with five of them each. Coello's work consisted of researching and compiling plans or other sources and then drawing new maps from them, with very little fieldwork. The governmental subsidy for the elaboration of the Atlas was definitively cut as a result of the publication of the first sheet of the National Topographic Map in 1875, which was the reason why the project was left half-finished. The Atlas de España y sus posesiones de Ultramar represents in any case a key point in the development of cartography in Spain, and many years later, it continues to have a unique value for the study of the urban evolution of many Spanish cities, even being used as a reference work in the elaboration of urban projects.

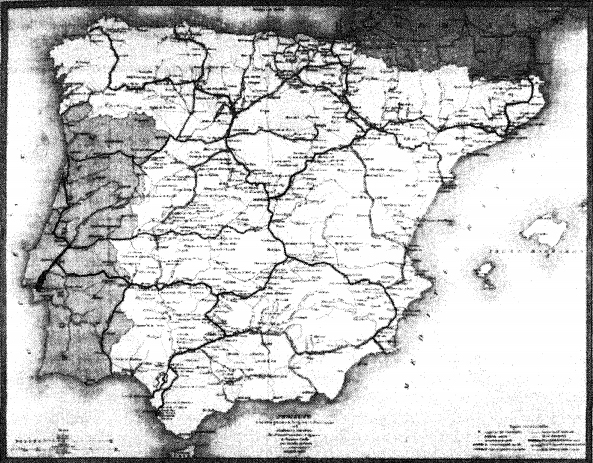
Project of general navigation lines and railroads of 1855.

=== Project of the general navigation lines and railroads in the Spanish Peninsula ===
On October 19, 1849, Francisco Coello married Aurora Pacheco Casani, who was nine years younger than him, and with whom he had four children: Adolfo, Gonzalo, Carlos, and Aurora. Thanks to his good relationship with Zarco del Valle, Coello obtained access to the funds of the Depósito Topográfico de Ingenieros, where he found cartographic material of interest for his Atlas. In 1855, he elaborated the monograph Memoria: Proyecto de las líneas generales de navegación y de ferrocarriles en la Península Española (in English: Project of the general navigation lines and railroads in the Spanish Peninsula), which outlined the guidelines to be followed in the development of transport infrastructures in Spain and advocated for an integral conception of the system of roads, railroads, canals and rivers. He defended a configuration of the railway network with both radial and transversal components, going beyond all the plans drawn up until then, whose structure had always been radial. He also believed that the development of a good communications system could constitute a vehicle for bringing Spain and Portugal closer together politically, in line with his Iberianist conviction.

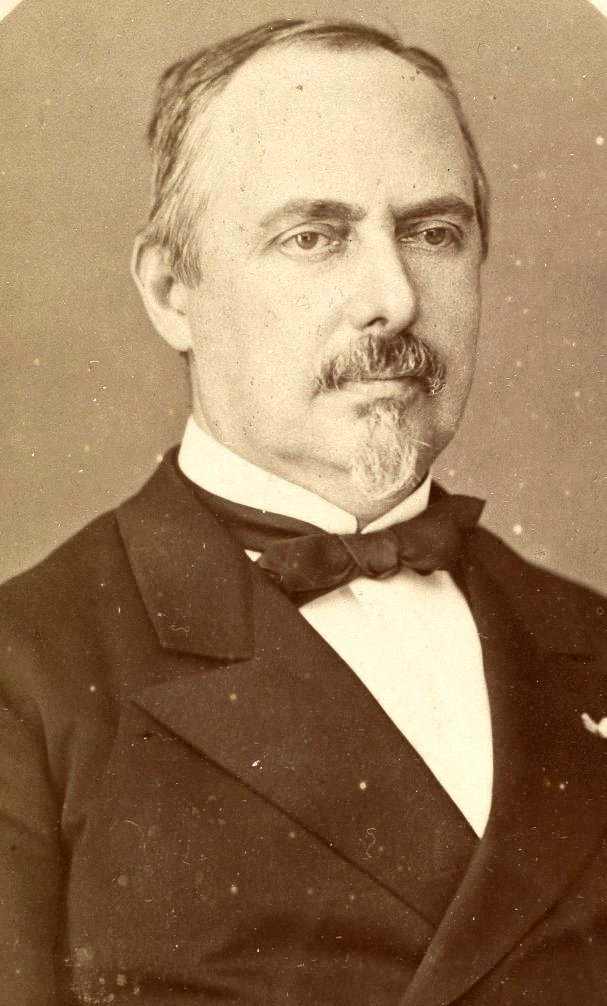
Francisco Coello, circa 1882

=== General Board of Statistics ===
In April 1858, Coello joined the General Statistical Commission of the Kingdom, which Laureano Figuerola and Madoz also later joined. There, he initially served as a member and collaborated in the elaboration of a study to carry out a “Topographic Parcel Cadastre” in Spain, which would serve as a support for the Treasury. This depended on the deficient system of land surveys, whose information came from the declarations of the owners themselves and was, therefore, of doubtful veracity. In 1859, he participated in the drafting of the Land Measurement Law.

In 1861, under the direction of Alejandro Oliván, this commission was renamed General Board of Statistics. It had three differentiated sections: “geographic operations”, “special maps” and “topographic-cadastral operations”, entrusted respectively to Francisco de Luxán, Agustín Pascual, and Francisco Coello; these three would evolve five years later until the formation of the Statistics section and the Geographic Operations section. The cadastral project devised by Coello was perhaps too rigorous, detailed, and impracticable, due to its thoroughness and precision; the work carried out took place mainly in municipalities in the province of Madrid. The General Board of Statistics had serious financing problems, due to the government budget cuts it suffered throughout the 1860s. In 1866, with the return to the government of Narváez, another deep cut to the Board took place, which would result in the forced resignation of the geographer from Jaén. That same year, Coello also requested his definitive discharge from the army.

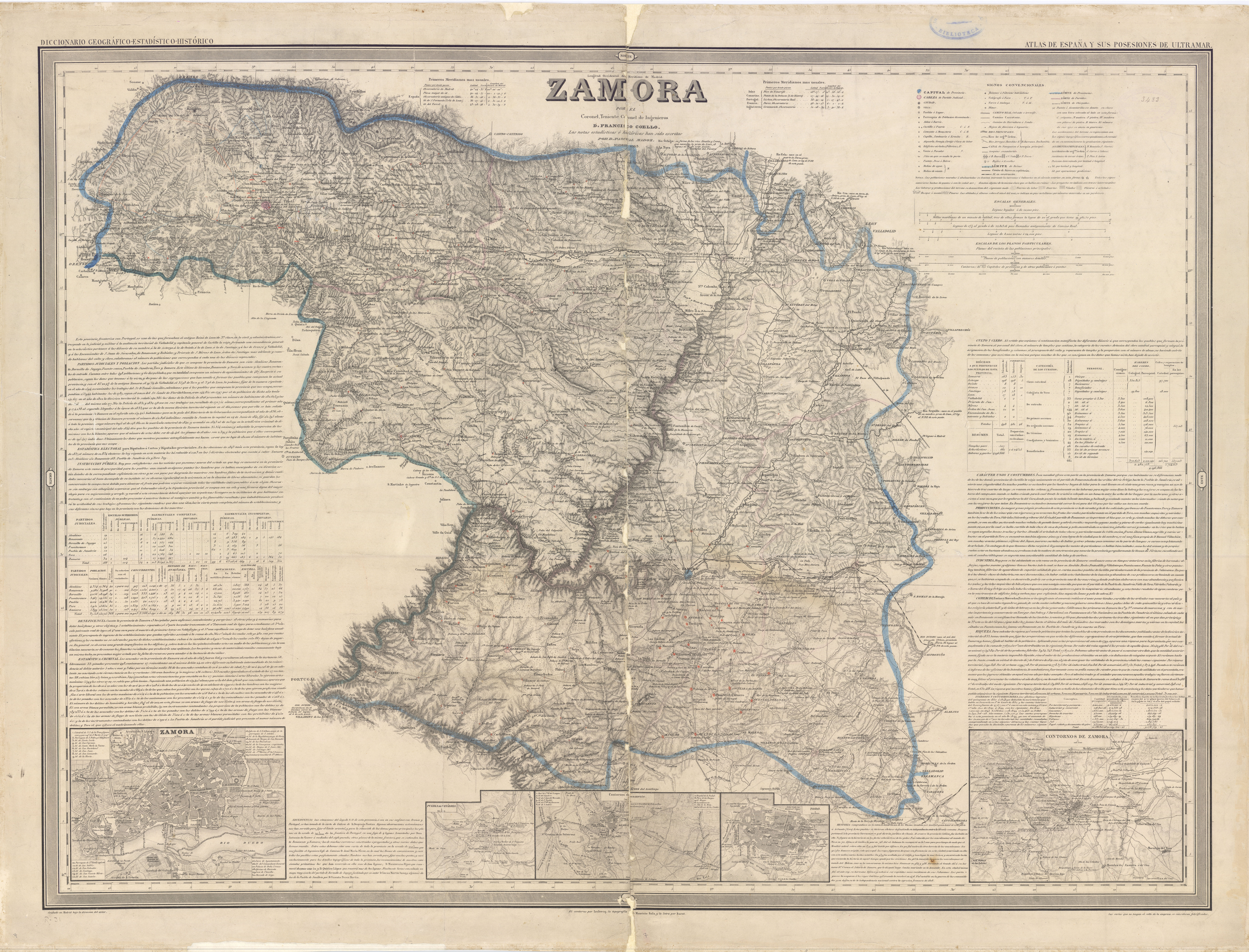
Provincial map of Zamora, from the 1863 Atlas de España y sus posesiones de Ultramar, scale 1:200,000.

=== Final years ===
Since 1855, Coello had been the owner of a property known as “Los Hervideros de Fuensanta”, which included a spa and was acquired at public auction. It was located near the town of Pozuelo de Calatrava, in the province of Ciudad Real de Calatrava. In this context, Coello's financial problems became evident around 1864, which finally caused him to lose ownership of the property due to debts on January 1, 1869.

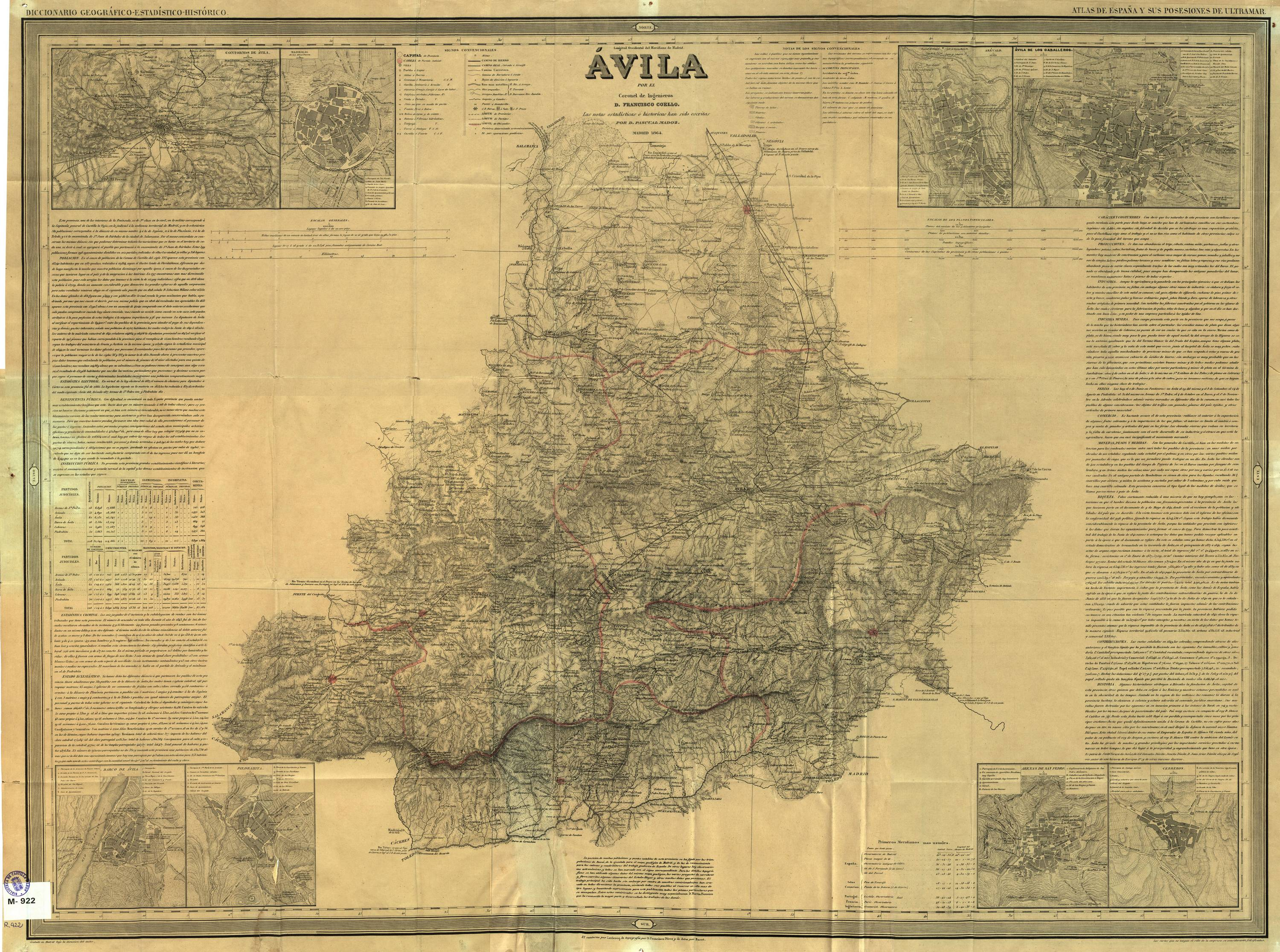
Provincial map of Avila, from the 1864 Atlas de España y sus posesiones de Ultramar, scale 1:200,000.

On December 27, 1874, he became a member of the Royal Academy of History, where he occupied the “Medal 1”, replacing Francisco de Paula Quadrado. In March 1876, Francisco Coello was the main promoter and one of the founding members of the Geographical Society of Madrid -later the Royal Geographical Society -, of which he could practically be considered the first president. He aimed to put Spain on the same level as other European territories and cities such as Paris, Berlin, or London, which already had their respective geographical societies since the 1820s; in this sense, Coello himself said he was ashamed that no Spaniard “sat” at the presidential table of the Geographical Congress of Paris in 1875. Coello's maps were included in the monthly bulletins issued by the Society.

In the words of Rodriguez Esteban, Coello “made the Geographical Society of Madrid the reflection of his intentions and his activity, trying at all times to place the work of the Society in the field of the scientific sphere, research, and theoretical propaganda”. He also strongly defended the interest that Spain should have in the occupation of territories in North Africa, specifically the “Cabo del Agua”. In this line of Africanism, it is worth mentioning that he was part, together with the regenerationist Joaquín Costa, of the Spanish Society of Africanists and Colonists, founded in 1883, and whose creation had already been proposed by Coello in 1881. He was also critical of Bismarck's Germany because of the crisis in the Carolines in 1885. Coello held the position of honorary president of the Society from October 15, 1878, until his death in 1898, at 23 Serrano Street. He was buried in the cemetery of San Justo, in a ceremony attended by Antonio Aguilar y Correa as representative of the Royal Academy of History, as well as by Generals Azcárraga, Polavieja, and Chinchilla.
