= Hispanic =

Spanish-speaking cultures and persons

Hispanics
Spanish: Hispanos

Regions with significant populations
- Hispanic America · United States · Spain · Hispanic Africa

Languages
- Predominantly Spanish

Religion
- 66% Roman Catholic 21% Protestantism 11% Including irreligion, Judaism and other abrahamic religion

The term Hispanic (Spanish: hispano) refers to people, cultures, or countries related to Spain, the Spanish language, or Hispanidad broadly. In some contexts, especially within the United States, "Hispanic" is used as an ethnic or a meta-ethnic term.

The term commonly applies to Spaniards and Spanish-speaking (Hispanophone) populations and countries in Hispanic America, (the continent) and Hispanic Africa (Equatorial Guinea and the disputed territory of Western Sahara), which were formerly part of the Spanish Empire due to colonization mainly between the 16th and 20th centuries. The cultures of Hispanophone countries outside Spain have been influenced as well by the local pre-Hispanic cultures or other foreign influences.

There was also Spanish influence in the former Spanish East Indies, including the Philippines, Marianas, and other nations. However, Spanish is not a predominant language in these regions and, as a result, their inhabitants are not usually considered Hispanic.

Hispanic culture is a set of customs, traditions, beliefs, and art forms in music, literature, dress, architecture, cuisine, and other cultural fields that are generally shared by peoples in Hispanic regions, but which can vary considerably from one country or territory to another. The Spanish language is the main cultural element shared by Hispanic peoples.

== Etymology ==
The term Hispanic derives from the Latin word Hispanicus, the adjectival derivation of Hispania, which means of the Iberian Peninsula and possibly Celtiberian origin. In English the word is attested from the 16th century (and in the late 19th century in American English).

The words Spain, Spanish, and Spaniard are of the same etymology as Hispanus, ultimately.

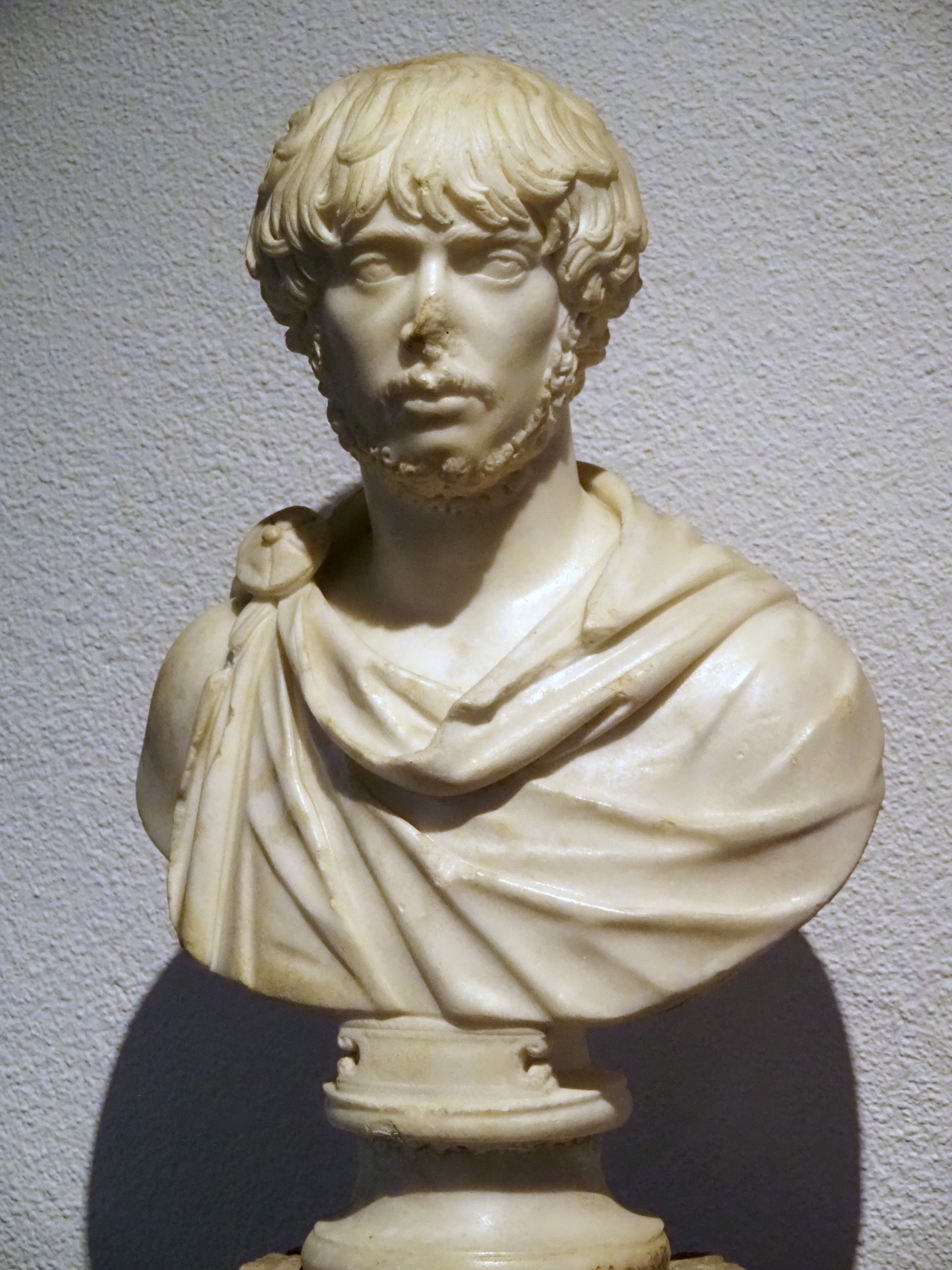
Bust of a young Hispano-Roman man, 2nd century.

Hispanus was the Latin name given to a person from Hispania during Roman rule. The ancient Roman Hispania, which roughly comprised what is currently called the Iberian Peninsula, included the contemporary states of Spain, Portugal, parts of France, Andorra, and the British Overseas Territory of Gibraltar. In English, the term Hispano-Roman is sometimes used. The Hispano-Romans were composed of people from many different Indigenous tribes, in addition to colonists from Italia. Some famous Hispani (plural of Hispanus) and Hispaniensis were the emperors Trajan, Marcus Aurelius, Hadrian, Theodosius I and Magnus Maximus, the poets Marcus Annaeus Lucanus, Martial and Prudentius, the philosophers Seneca the Elder and Seneca the Younger, and the usurper Maximus of Hispania. A number of these men, such as Trajan, Hadrian and others, were in fact descended from Roman colonial families.

Here follows a comparison of several terms related to Hispanic:

- Hispania was the name of the Iberian Peninsula/Iberia from the 3rd century BC to the 8th AD, both as a Roman Empire province and immediately thereafter as a Visigothic kingdom, 5th–8th century.
- Hispano-Roman is used to refer to the culture and people of Hispania, both during the Roman period and subsequent Visigothic period.
- Hispanic is used to refer to modern Spain, to the Spanish language, and to the Spanish-speaking nations of the world, particularly the Americas.
- Spanish is used to refer to the people, nationality, culture, language and other things of Spain.
- Spaniard is used to refer to the people of Spain.

Hispania was divided into two provinces: Hispania Citerior and Hispania Ulterior. In 27 BC, Hispania Ulterior was divided into two new provinces, Hispania Baetica and Hispania Lusitania, while Hispania Citerior was renamed Hispania Tarraconensis. This division of Hispania explains the usage of the singular and plural forms (Spain, and The Spains) used to refer to the peninsula and its kingdoms in the Middle Ages.

Before the marriage of Queen Isabella I of Castile and King Ferdinand II of Aragon in 1469, the four Christian kingdoms of the Iberian Peninsula—the Kingdom of Portugal, the Crown of Aragon, the Crown of Castile, and the Kingdom of Navarre—were collectively called The Spains. This revival of the old Roman concept in the Middle Ages appears to have originated in Provençal, and was first documented at the end of the 11th century. In the Council of Constance, the four kingdoms shared one vote.

The terms Spain and the Spains were not interchangeable. Spain was a geographic territory, home to several kingdoms (Christian and Muslim), with separate governments, laws, languages, religions, and customs, and was the historical remnant of the Hispano-Gothic unity. Spain was not a political entity until much later, and when referring to the Middle Ages, one should not be confounded with the nation-state of today. The term The Spains referred specifically to a collective of juridico-political units, first the Christian kingdoms, and then the different kingdoms ruled by the same king. Illustrative of this fact is the historical ecclesiastical title of Primate of the Spains, traditionally claimed by the Archbishop of Braga, a Portuguese prelate.

With the Decretos de Nueva Planta, Philip V started to organize the fusion of his kingdoms that until then were ruled as distinct and independent, but this unification process lacked a formal and juridic proclamation.

Although colloquially and literally the expression "King of Spain" or "King of the Spains" was already widespread, it did not refer to a unified nation-state. It was only in the constitution of 1812 that was adopted the name Españas (Spains) for the Spanish nation and the use of the title of "king of the Spains". The constitution of 1876 adopts for the first time the name "Spain" for the Spanish nation and from then on the kings would use the title of "king of Spain".

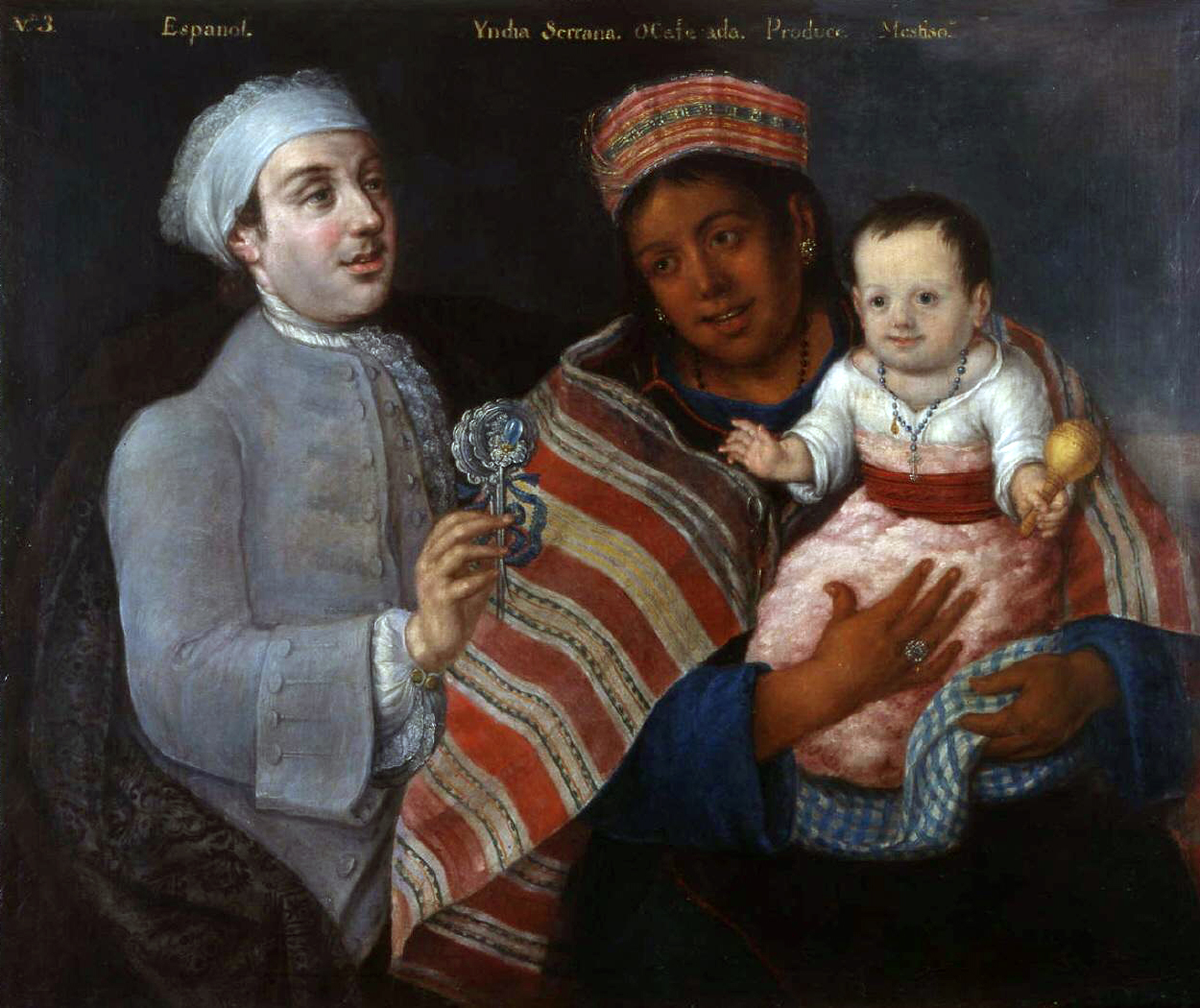
1770 painting of a mixed-race family from Spanish America. As a result of the significant mixing of populations during this time, the term "Hispanic" is often considered independent of racial background.

The expansion of the Spanish Empire between 1492 and 1898 brought thousands of Spanish migrants to the conquered lands, who established settlements, mainly in the Americas, but also in other distant parts of the world (as in the Philippines, the lone Spanish territory in Asia), producing a number of multiracial populations. Today, the varied populations of these places, including those with Spanish ancestry, are also designated as Hispanic.

=== Definitions in ancient Rome ===
The Latin gentile adjectives that belong to Hispania are Hispanus, Hispanicus, and Hispaniensis. A Hispanus is someone who is a native of Hispania with no foreign parents, while children born in Hispania of Roman parents were Hispanienses. Hispaniensis means 'connected in some way to Hispania', as in "Exercitus Hispaniensis" ('the Spanish army') or "mercatores Hispanienses" ('Spanish merchants'). Hispanicus implies 'of' or 'belonging to' Hispania or the Hispanus or of their fashion as in "gladius Hispanicus". The gentile adjectives were not ethnolinguistic but derived primarily on a geographic basis, from the toponym Hispania as the people of Hispania spoke different languages, although Titus Livius (Livy) said they could all understand each other, not making clear if they spoke dialects of the same language or were polyglots. The first recorded use of an anthroponym derived from the toponym Hispania is attested in one of the five fragments, of Ennius in 236 BC who wrote "Hispane, non Romane memoretis loqui me" ("Remember that I speak like a Hispanic not a Roman") as having been said by a native of Hispania.

=== Definitions in Portugal, Spain, the rest of Europe ===
In Portugal, Hispanic refers to something historical related to ancient Hispania (especially the terms Hispano-Roman and Hispania) or the Spanish language and cultures shared by all the Spanish-speaking countries. Although sharing the etymology for the word (pt: hispânico, es: hispánico), the definition for Hispanic is different between Portugal and Spain. The Royal Spanish Academy (Spanish: Real Academia Española, RAE), the official royal institution responsible for regulating the Spanish language defines the terms "hispano" and "hispánico" (which in Spain have slightly different meanings) as:

Hispano:

1. A native of Hispania [Roman region]
2. Belonging or relating to Hispania
3. Spanish, as applied to a person
4. Of or pertaining to Hispanic America
5. Of or pertaining to the population of Hispanic American origin who live in the United States of America
6. A person of this origin who lives in the United States of America

Hispánico

1. Belonging or relating to ancient Hispania or the people inhabiting the region
2. Belonging or relating to Spain and Spanish-speaking countries

The modern term to identify Portuguese and Spanish territories under a single nomenclature is "Iberian", and the one to refer to cultures derived from both countries in the Americas is "Iberian-American". These designations can be mutually recognized by people in Portugal and Brazil. "Hispanic" is totally void of any self-identification in Brazil, and quite to the contrary, serves the purpose of marking a clear distinction in relation to neighboring countries' culture. Brazilians may identify as Latin Americans, but refute being considered Hispanics because their language and culture are neither part of the Hispanic cultural sphere, nor Spanish-speaking world.

In Spanish, the term "hispano", as in "hispanoamericano", refers to the people of Spanish origin who live in the Americas and to a relationship to Spain or to the Spanish language. There are people in Hispanic America that are not of Spanish origin, such as Amerindians- the original people of these areas, as well as Africans and people with origins from other parts of Europe.

Like in Portugal, in the rest of Europe (and wider world) the concept of 'Hispanic' refers to historical ancient Hispania (especially the term Hispano-Roman and Hispania during the Roman Empire) or the Spanish language and cultures shared by all the Spanish-speaking countries.

=== Definitions in the United States ===
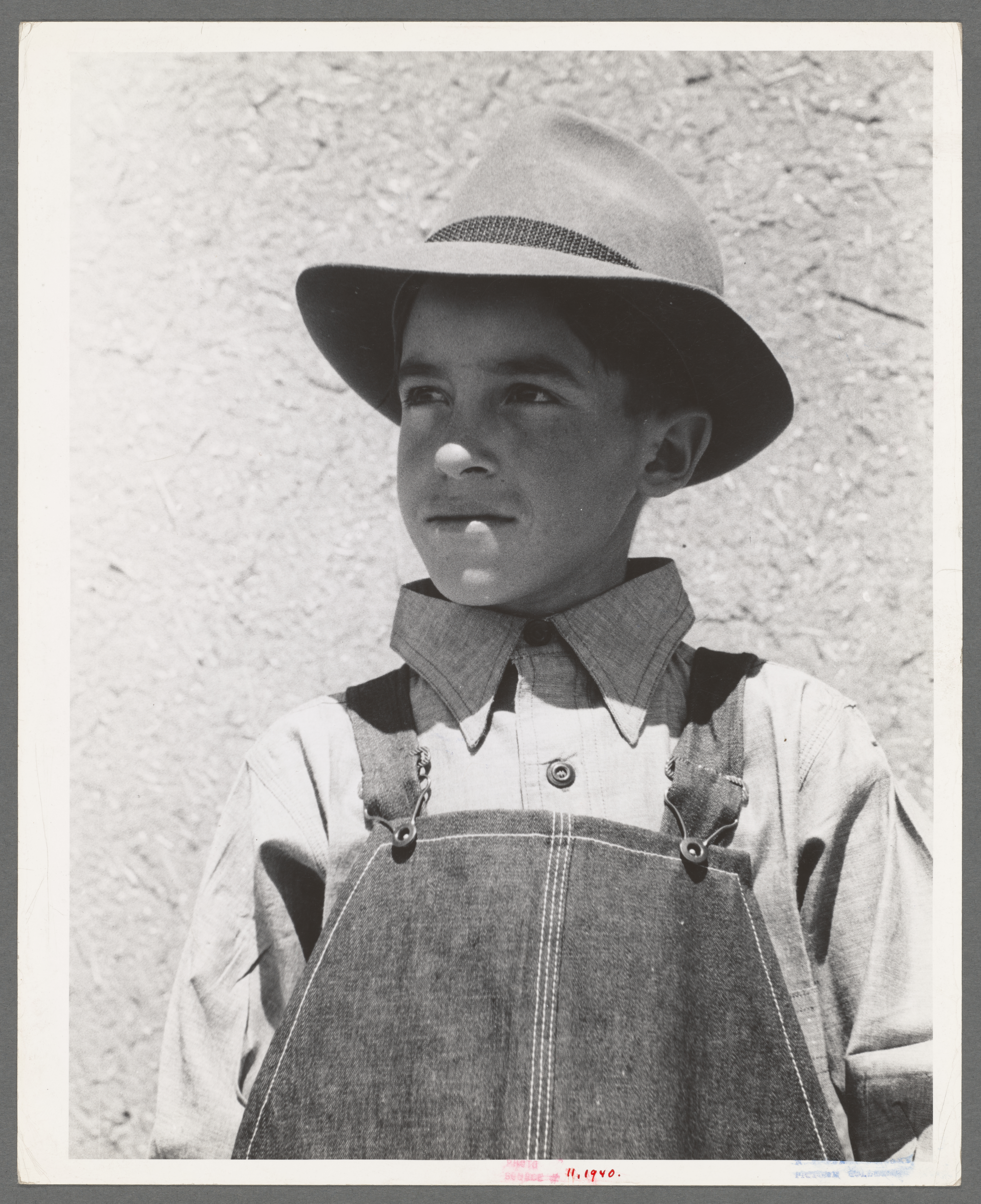
Hispanic boy from New Mexico, 1940 photograph.

Both Hispanic and Latino are widely used in American English for Spanish-speaking people and their descendants in the United States. While Hispanic refers to Spanish speakers overall, Latino refers specifically to people of Latin American descent. Hispanic can also be used for the people and culture of Spain as well as Latin America. While originally the term Hispanic referred primarily to the Hispanos of New Mexico within the United States, today, organizations in the country use the term as a broad catchall to refer to persons with a historical and cultural relationship with Spain regardless of race and ethnicity. The United States Census Bureau uses Hispanic or Latino to refer to a person of Cuban, Mexican, Puerto Rican, South or Central American, or other Spanish culture or origin regardless of race and states that Hispanics or Latinos can be of any race and any ancestry.

Because of the technical distinctions involved in defining "race" vs. "ethnicity", there is confusion among the general population about the designation of Hispanic identity. Currently, the United States Census Bureau defines six race categories:

- White or Caucasian
- Black or African American
- American Indian or Alaska Native
- Asian
- Native Hawaiian or Other Pacific Islander
- Some Other Race

A 1997 notice by the U.S. Office of Management and Budget defined Hispanic or Latino persons as being "persons who trace their origin or descent to Mexico, Puerto Rico, Cuba, Central and South America, and other Spanish cultures." The United States Census uses the ethnonyms Hispanic or Latino to refer to "a person of Cuban, Mexican, Puerto Rican, South or Central American, or other Hispanic culture or origin regardless of race."

The 2010 census asked if the person was "Spanish/Hispanic/Latino". The United States census uses the Hispanic or Latino to refer to "a person of Cuban, Mexican, Puerto Rican, South or Central American, or other Spanish culture or origin regardless of race." The Census Bureau also explains that "[o]rigin can be viewed as the heritage, nationality group, lineage, or country of birth of the person or the person's ancestors before their arrival in the United States. People who identify their origin as Hispanic, Latino or Spanish may be of any race."

The U.S. Department of Transportation defines Hispanic as, "persons of Mexican, Puerto Rican, Cuban, Central or South American, or other Spanish culture or origin, regardless of race." This definition has been adopted by the Small Business Administration as well as by many federal, state, and municipal agencies for the purposes of awarding government contracts to minority owned businesses. The Congressional Hispanic Caucus and the Congressional Hispanic Conference include representatives of Spanish and Portuguese, Puerto Rican and Mexican descent. The Hispanic Society of America is dedicated to the study of the arts and cultures of the Hispanic and Lusitanic world. The Hispanic Association of Colleges and Universities, proclaimed champions of Hispanic success in higher education, is committed to Hispanic educational success in the United States, and the Hispanic and Lusitanic world.

The U.S. Equal Employment Opportunity Commission encourages any individual who believes that he or she is Hispanic to self-identify as Hispanic. The United States Department of Labor – Office of Federal Contract Compliance Programs encourages the same self-identification. As a result, individuals with origins to part of the Spanish Empire may self-identify as Hispanic, because an employer may not override an individual's self-identification.

The 1970 census was the first time that a "Hispanic" identifier was used and data collected with the question. The definition of "Hispanic" has been modified in each successive census.

In a recent study, most Spanish speakers of Spanish or Hispanic American descent do not prefer the term Hispanic or Latino when it comes to describing their identity. Instead, they prefer to be identified by their country of origin. When asked if they have a preference for either being identified as Hispanic or Latino, the Pew study finds that "half (51%) say they have no preference for either term." Among those who do express a preference, "'Hispanic' is preferred over 'Latino' by more than a two-to-one margin—33% versus 14%." 21% prefer to be referred to simply as "Americans". A majority (51%) say they most often identify themselves by their family's country of origin, while 24% say they prefer a pan-ethnic label such as Hispanic or Latino.

== Culture ==
The Miguel de Cervantes Prize is awarded to Hispanic writers, whereas the Latin Grammy Award recognizes Hispanic musicians, and the Platino Awards as given to outstanding Hispanic films.

=== Music ===
Folk and popular dance and music also varies greatly among Hispanics. For instance, the music from Spain is a lot different from the Hispanic American, although there is a high grade of exchange between both continents. In addition, due to the high national development of the diverse nationalities and regions of Spain, there is a lot of music in the different languages of the Peninsula (Catalan, Galician and Basque, mainly). See, for instance, Music of Catalonia or Rock català, Music of Galicia, Cantabria and Asturias, and Basque music. Flamenco is also a very popular music style in Spain, especially in Andalusia. Spanish ballads "romances" can be traced in Argentina as "milongas", same structure but different scenarios.

On the other side of the ocean, Hispanic America is also home to a wide variety of music, even though Latin music is often erroneously thought of, as a single genre. Hispanic Caribbean music tends to favor complex polyrhythms of African origin. Mexican music shows combined influences of mostly European and Native American origin, while traditional Northern Mexican music—norteño and banda— polka, has influence from polka music brought by Central European settlers to Mexico which later influenced western music. The music of Hispanic Americans—such as tejano music—has influences in rock, jazz, R&B, pop, and country music as well as traditional Mexican music such as Mariachi. Meanwhile, native Andean sounds and melodies are the backbone of Peruvian and Bolivian music, but also play a significant role in the popular music of most South American countries and are heavily incorporated into the folk music of Ecuador and the tunes of Colombia, and in Chile where they play a fundamental role in the form of the greatly followed nueva canción. In U.S. communities of immigrants from these countries it is common to hear these styles. Rock en español, Latin hip-hop, Salsa, Merengue, Bachata, Cumbia and Reggaeton styles tend to appeal to the broader Hispanic population, and varieties of Cuban music are popular with many Hispanics of all backgrounds.

=== Literature ===
Miguel de Cervantes Prize, most prestigious literary award in the Spanish language

Spanish-language literature and folklore is very rich and is influenced by a variety of countries. There are thousands of writers from many places, and dating from the Middle Ages to the present. Some of the most recognized writers are:

- Spain: Miguel de Cervantes Saavedra, Lope de Vega, Calderón de la Barca, Federico García Lorca, Miguel de Unamuno,
- Mexico: Carlos Fuentes, Octavio Paz,
- Guatemala: Miguel Ángel Asturias,
- U.S.: George Santayana, Sabine Ulibarri,
- Cuba: José Martí,
- Colombia: Gabriel García Márquez, Rafael Pombo,
- Uruguay: Horacio Quiroga, Cristina Peri Rossi,
- Venezuela: Rómulo Gallegos,
- Nicaragua: Rubén Darío,
- Peru: Mario Vargas Llosa, Ciro Alegría
- Argentina: Luisa Valenzuela, Julio Cortázar, Jorge Luis Borges, Ernesto Sabato
- Honduras: Roberto Quesada,
- Chile: Pablo Neruda, Gabriela Mistral,
- Dominican Republic: Pedro Henríquez Ureña,
- Equatorial Guinea: Juan Tomás Ávila Laurel,
- Costa Rica: Joaquin Garcia Monge and
- Ecuador: Juan León Mera.
- Philippines: Jose Rizal, Luis Rodriguez Varela, Jesus Balmori

=== Sports ===
In the majority of the Hispanic countries, association football is the most popular sport. The men's national teams of Argentina, Uruguay and Spain have won the FIFA World Cup a total seven times. Spanish La Liga is one of the most watched sports leagues in the world, known for FC Barcelona and Real Madrid. Meanwhile, the Argentine Primera División is one of the strongest leagues in the Americas.

However, baseball is the most popular sport in some Central American and Caribbean countries (especially Cuba, Dominican Republic, Nicaragua, Venezuela and the U.S. territory of Puerto Rico), as well as in the diaspora in the mainland United States. Notable Hispanic teams in early baseball are the All Cubans, Cuban Stars and New York Cubans. The Hispanic Heritage Baseball Museum recognizes Hispanic baseball personalities. Nearly 30 percent (22 percent foreign-born Hispanics) of MLB players today have Hispanic heritage.

Several Hispanic sportspeople have been successful worldwide, such as Diego Maradona, Alfredo di Stefano, Lionel Messi, Diego Forlán, Fernando Torres, Xavi, Andrés Iniesta, Iker Casillas, Xabi Alonso (association football), Juan Manuel Fangio, Juan Pablo Montoya, Eliseo Salazar, Fernando Alonso, Marc Gené, Carlos Sainz Sr. and Carlos Sainz Jr. (auto racing), Ángel Nieto, Dani Pedrosa, Jorge Lorenzo, Marc Márquez, Marc Coma, Nani Roma (motorcycle racing), Emanuel Ginóbili, Pau Gasol, Marc Gasol (basketball), Julio César Chávez, Saúl Álvarez, Carlos Monzón (boxing), Miguel Induráin, Alberto Contador, Nairo Quintana, Lucho Herrera, Richard Carapaz, Egan Bernal (cycling), Roberto de Vicenzo, Ángel Cabrera, Sergio García, Severiano Ballesteros, José María Olazábal (golf), Luciana Aymar (field hockey), Yair Rodríguez, Brandon Moreno, Ilia Topuria (mixed martial arts), Rafael Nadal, Marcelo Ríos, Guillermo Vilas, Gabriela Sabatini, Juan Martín del Potro (tennis).

Notable Hispanic sports television networks are ESPN Deportes, Fox Deportes, Televisa Deportes, Azteca Deportes and TyC Sports.

=== Religion ===
The Spanish and the Portuguese took the Catholic faith to their colonies in the Americas, Africa, and Asia; Catholicism remains the predominant religion amongst most Hispanics. A small but growing number of Hispanics belong to a Protestant denomination. Hispanic Christians form the largest ethno-linguistic group among Christians in the world, about 18% of the world's Christian population are Hispanic (around 430 million).

In the United States, some 65% of Hispanics and Latinos report themselves Catholic and 21% Protestant, with 13% having no affiliation. A minority among the Catholics, about one in five, are charismatics. Among the Protestant, 85% are "Born-again Christians" and belong to Evangelical or Pentecostal churches. Among the smallest groups, less than 4%, are Jewish.

Countries	Population Total	Christians %	Christian Population	Unaffiliated %	Unaffiliated Population	Other religions %	Other religions Population	Source
Argentina	43,830,000	85.4%	37,420,000	12.1%	5,320,000	2.5%	1,090,000	
Bolivia	11,830,000	94.0%	11,120,000	4.1%	480,000	1.9%	230,000	
Chile	18,540,000	88.3%	16,380,000	9.7%	1,800,000	2.0%	360,000	
Colombia	52,160,000	92.3%	48,150,000	6.7%	3,510,000	1.0%	500,000	
Costa Rica	5,270,000	90.8%	4,780,000	8.0%	420,000	1.2%	70,000	
Cuba	11,230,000	58.9%	6,610,000	23.2%	2,600,000	17.9%	2,020,000	
Dominican Republic	11,280,000	88.0%	9,930,000	10.9%	1,230,000	1.1%	120,000	
Ecuador	16,480,000	94.0%	15,490,000	5.6%	920,000	0.4%	70,000	
El Salvador	6,670,000	88.0%	5,870,000	11.2%	740,000	0.8%	60,000	
Equatorial Guinea	1,469,000	88.7%	1,303,000	5.0%	73,000	6.3%	93,000	
Guatemala	18,210,000	95.3%	17,360,000	3.9%	720,000	0.8%	130,000	
Honduras	9,090,000	87.5%	7,950,000	10.5%	950,000	2.0%	190,000	
Mexico	126,010,000	94.1%	118,570,000	5.7%	7,240,000	0.2%	200,000	
Nicaragua	6,690,000	85.3%	5,710,000	13.0%	870,000	1.7%	110,000	
Panama	4,020,000	92.7%	3,720,000	5.0%	200,000	2.3%	100,000	
Paraguay	7,630,000	96.9%	7,390,000	1.1%	90,000	2.0%	150,000	
Peru	32,920,000	95.4%	31,420,000	3.1%	1,010,000	1.5%	490,000	
Philippines	108,000,000	91%	98,280,000	0.1%	108,000	8.9%	9,612,000	
Puerto Rico (Note: Note: Puerto Rico is a territory of the United States.)	3,790,000	90.5%	3,660,000	7.3%	80,000	2.2%	40,000	
Spain	48,400,000	75.2%	34,410,000	21.0%	10,190,000	3.8%	1,800,000	
Uruguay	3,490,000	57.0%	1,990,000	41.5%	1,450,000	1.5%	50,000	
Venezuela	33,010,000	89.5%	29,540,000	9.7%	3,220,000	0.8%	250,000	

==== Christianity ====
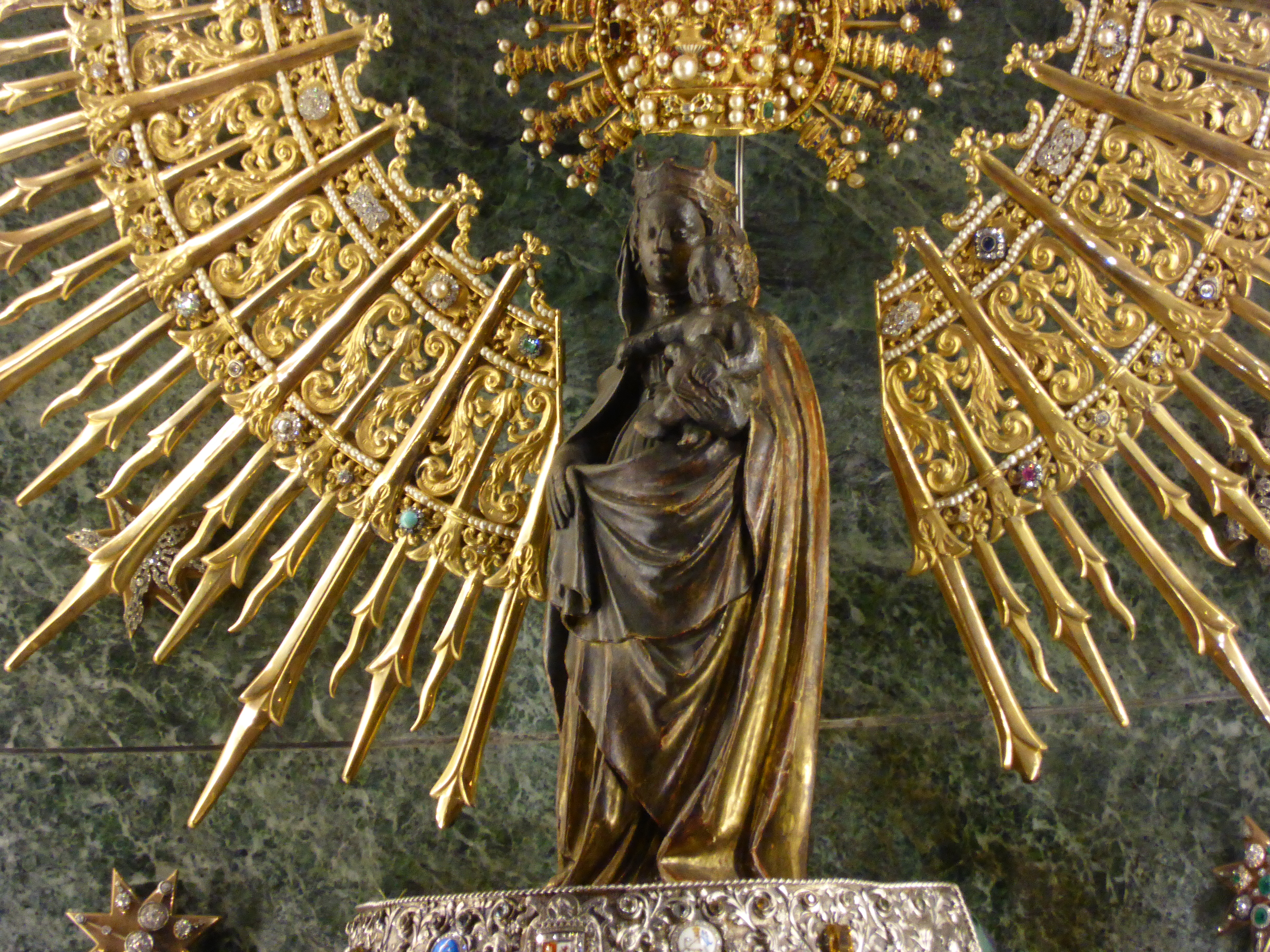
The image of Our Lady of the Pillar wearing her canonical crown

Among the Spanish-speaking Catholics, most communities celebrate their homeland's patron saint, dedicating a day for this purpose with festivals and religious services. Some Spanish-speakers in Latin America syncretize Roman Catholicism and African or Native American rituals and beliefs. Such is the case of Santería, popular with Afro-Cubans, which combines old African beliefs in the form of Roman Catholic saints and rituals. Other syncretistic beliefs include Spiritism and Curanderismo. In Catholic tradition, Our Lady of the Pillar is considered the Patroness of the Hispanic people and the Hispanic world.

==== Islam ====
While a tiny minority, there are some Muslims in Latin America, in the United States, and in the Philippines. Those in the Philippines live predominantly in Bangsamoro.

==== Judaism ====
There are also Spanish-speaking Jews, most of whom are the descendants of Ashkenazi Jews who migrated from Europe (German Jews, Russian Jews, Polish Jews, etc.) to Hispanic America, particularly Argentina, Uruguay, Peru, and Cuba (Argentina is host to the third-largest Jewish population in the Western Hemisphere, after the United States and Canada) in the 19th century and following World War II. Many Spanish-speaking Jews also originate from the small communities of reconverted descendants of anusim—those whose Spanish Sephardi Jewish ancestors long ago hid their Jewish ancestry and beliefs in fear of persecution by the Spanish Inquisition in the Iberian Peninsula and Ibero-America. The Spanish Inquisition led to many forced conversions of Spanish Jews.

Genetic studies on the (male) Y-chromosome conducted by the University of Leeds in 2008 appear to support the idea that the number of forced conversions have been previously underestimated significantly. They found that twenty percent of Spanish males have Y-chromosomes associated with Sephardic Jewish ancestry. This may imply that there were more forced conversions than was previously thought.

There are also thought to be many Catholic-professing descendants of marranos and Spanish-speaking crypto-Jews in the Southwestern United States and scattered through Hispanic America. Additionally, there are Sephardic Jews who are descendants of those Jews who fled Spain to Turkey, Syria, and North Africa, some of whom have now migrated to Hispanic America, holding on to some Spanish/Sephardic customs, such as the Ladino language, which mixes Spanish, Hebrew, Arabic and others, though written with Hebrew and Latin characters. Ladinos were also African slaves captive in Spain held prior to the colonial period in the Americas. (See also History of the Jews in Hispanic America and List of Hispanic American Jews.)

== See also ==
- Spanish language
  - Hispanophone
  - Languages of Spain
  - Spanish language in the Americas
  - Spanish language in the United States
  - Chavacano
- Latin Americans
  - Afro-Latin American
  - Amerindians
  - Asian Latin American
  - Criollo people
  - Mestizo
  - Mulatto
  - White Latin American
  - Isleño Americans
  - Black Hispanic and Latino Americans
  - White Hispanic and Latino Americans
  - Hispanic America
  - Hispanic Heritage Sites (U.S. National Park Service)
  - Hispanic Paradox
  - Cuban-American lobby
- Lusitanians
- Panhispanism
  - Hispanism
  - Flag of the Hispanic People
  - Hispanophobia
- Culture of Spain
- Spanish Filipino
  - Chavacano
  - Philippine Spanish
  - Hispanic influence on Filipino culture
- Emancipados
- Fernandinos
- Ibero-America (Iberian Peninsula)
- Latin Union
