= Flag of the Hispanic people =

Ethnic flag

Flag of the Hispanicity
- Bandera de la Hispanidad
- Proportion: 1:2
- Adopted: 12 October 1932; 94 years ago
- Design: A white banner with three purple crosses pattée and the Sun of May rising from behind the center one.
- Designed by: Ángel Camblor

The flag of the Hispanic people (Spanish: Bandera de la Hispanidad, flag of the Hispanicity) is an ethnic flag used to represent the Hispanic people or Hispanic community.

== Symbolism ==
The flag of the Hispanicity displays a white background with three purple crosses and a rising sun.

- The white field or background symbolizes peace and purity.
- The golden Sun of May evokes the indigenous god Inti and symbolizes the awakening of the new lands.
- The three crosses pattée symbolize Christopher Columbus's three ships, the Niña, the Pinta, and the Santa María.
- The Purpure color of the crosses represents the Spanish language and comes from the ancient use of this color in the lion of the Kingdom of León's flag, which was later incorporated with the Crown of Castile.

== History ==
The flag was designed by Ángel Camblor, a captain of the Uruguayan Army. He was the winner of a contest organized by Juana de Ibarbourou in 1932. The flag was first raised in Montevideo, at the Independence Square, on 12 October 1932.

The flag was formerly known as the "flag of the Hispanic race" (Spanish: Bandera de la raza hispánica).

== Alternative use as the flag of the Americas ==
Alternative version of the flag used to represent the Americas

The flag is also sometimes used to represent the entire geographical area of the Americas and not just as a flag of the Hispanic American people. The flag was officially adopted as the flag of the Americas—in this usage representing, besides Hispanic Americans, also Anglo-Americans, Franco-Americans (the Québécois, Haitians, Guadeloupians, Martininqians, and French Guianians), Luso-Americans, Dutch Americans (the inhabitants of the Dutch Antilles and Suriname), and Greenlanders—by all member countries of the Pan-American Conference at their Seventh Assembly in 1933.

== See also ==
- Hispanidad
- Hispanismo
- La Raza
