= Hispanic Africa =

Spanish-speaking countries in Africa

Hispanic Africa

Hispanic Africa (Spanish: Hispanoáfrica) is a cultural region integrated by the territories and countries of Africa where Spanish has an official presence. The people from this region are called "Hispanic Africans".

Hispanic Africa is integrated by the Spanish territories of Ceuta, Melilla, and the Canary Islands, and two countries, Equatorial Guinea and Western Sahara (in dispute with Morocco), the territories of Spain which are geographically in Africa and in addition to the areas of Saharawi presence in Algeria. The countries have 1.9 million inhabitants, the Spanish territories 2.3 million and in total both have approximately 4.3 million.

Spanish coexists with other native languages such as Fang and other languages of Equatorial Guinea, while in the Sahara it coexists with Arabic. Spanish is spoken as a native language by a small minority in Equatorial Guinea, primarily in larger cities.

The predominant religion in Equatorial Guinea is Christianity, especially Catholicism, while in the Sahara it is Islam.

== Countries ==
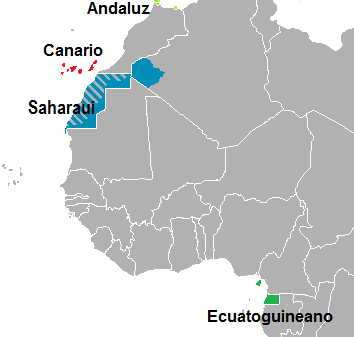
Spanish dialects in Africa

Country	Capital	Population	Size (km^{2})	Spanish speaking population %
Equatorial Guinea	Malabo	1,468,777	28,051	87%
Sahrawi Arab Democratic Republic	El Aaiún	513,000	266,000	

== Territories ==
- Canary Islands, Spain
- Ceuta, Spain
- Melilla, Spain
- Plazas de soberanía, Spain
- Tindouf Province refugee camps, Algeria

== Varieties of Spanish ==
- Equatoguinean Spanish
- Saharan Spanish
- Canarian Spanish
- Spanish in Morocco
- Haketia -- North African Sephardic Jewish

== See also ==
- Saharan Spanish
- Spanish Africa (disambiguation)
- Equatoguinean Spanish
- Canarian Spanish
- Françafrique
