= Culture of Latin America =

Formal and informal expression of the people of Latin America

The culture of Latin America is the formal or informal expression of the people of Latin America and includes both high culture (literature and high art) and popular culture (music, folk art, and dance), as well as religion and other customary practices. These are generally of Western origin, but have various degrees of Native American, African and Asian influence.

Definitions of Latin America vary. From a cultural perspective, Latin America generally refers to those parts of the Americas whose cultural, religious and linguistic heritage can be traced to the Latin culture of the late Roman Empire. This would include areas where Spanish, Portuguese, and various other Romance languages, which can trace their origin to the Vulgar Latin spoken in the late Roman Empire, are natively spoken. Such territories include almost all of Mexico, Central America and South America, with the exception of English or Dutch speaking territories. Culturally, it could also encompass the French derived culture in the Caribbean and North America, as it ultimately derives from Latin Roman influence as well. There is also an important Latin American cultural presence in the United States since the 16th century in areas such as California, Texas, and Florida, which were part of the Spanish Empire. More recently, in cities such as New York, Chicago, Dallas, Los Angeles, and Miami.

The richness of Latin American culture is the product of many influences, including:

- Spanish and Portuguese culture, owing to the region's history of colonization, settlement and continued immigration from Spain and Portugal. All the core elements of Latin American culture are of Iberian origin, which is ultimately related to Western culture.
- Pre-Columbian cultures, whose importance is today particularly notable in countries such as Mexico, Guatemala, Ecuador, Peru, Bolivia, and Paraguay. These cultures are central to Indigenous communities such as the Quechua, Maya, Aymara and Guaraní.
- 19th- and 20th-century European immigration from Spain, Portugal, Italy, Germany, France, and Eastern Europe; which transformed the region and had an impact in countries such as Argentina, Peru, Uruguay, Brazil (particular the southeast and southern regions), Colombia, Cuba, Chile, Venezuela, Ecuador (particularly in the southwest coast), Paraguay, Dominican Republic (specifically the northern region), and Mexico (particularly the northern and western regions).
- Chinese, Japanese, Korean, Indian, Lebanese and other Arab, Armenian and various other Asian groups. Mostly immigrants and indentured laborers who arrived from the coolie trade and influenced the culture of Brazil, Colombia, Cuba, Panama, Paraguay, Nicaragua, Ecuador and Peru in areas such as food, art, and cultural trade.
- The culture of Africa brought by Africans in the Trans-Atlantic former slave trade has influenced various parts of Latin America. Influences are particularly strong in dance, music, cuisine, and some syncretic religions of Cuba, Brazil, Dominican Republic, Venezuela, Northwest Ecuador, coastal Colombia, and Honduras.

== Ethnic groups ==
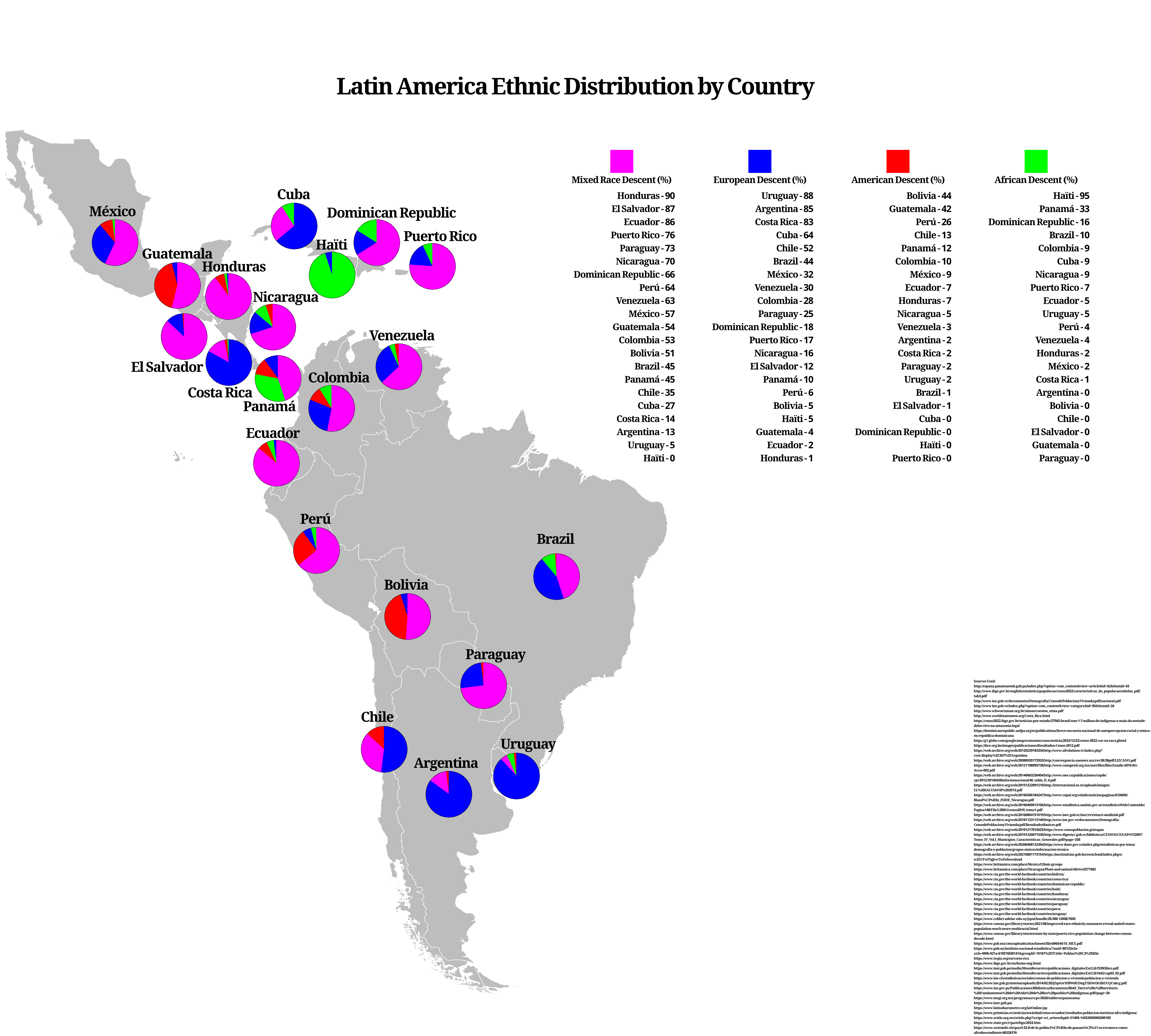
Ethnic distribution by country.

The population of Latin America is very diverse with many ethnic groups and different ancestries. Most of the Amerindian descendants are of mixed race ancestry.

In the 16th, 17th and 18th centuries there was a flow of Spanish and Portuguese emigrants who left for Latin America. It was never a large movement of people, but over the long period of time it had a major impact on Latin American populations: the Portuguese left for Brazil and the Spaniards left for Central and South America. Of the European immigrants, men greatly outnumbered women and many married Natives. This resulted in a mixing of the Amerindians and Europeans and today their descendants are known as mestizos. Even Latin American criollos, of mainly European ancestry, usually have some Native ancestry. Today, mestizos make up the majority of Latin America's population.

Starting in the late 16th century, a large number of former African slaves were brought to Latin America, especially to Brazil and the Caribbean. Nowadays, blacks make up the majority of the population in most Caribbean countries. Many of the former African slaves in Latin America mixed with the Europeans and their descendants (known as mulattoes) make up the majority of the population in some countries, such as the Dominican Republic, and large percentages in Brazil, Colombia, and Honduras. Mixes between the blacks and Amerindians also occurred, and their descendants are known as zambos. Many Latin American countries also have a substantial tri-racial population known as pardos, whose ancestry is a mix of Amerindians, Europeans and Africans.

Large numbers of European immigrants arrived in Latin America in the late 19th and early 20th centuries, most of them settling in the Southern Cone (Argentina, Uruguay, and southern Brazil). Nowadays the Southern Cone has a majority of people of largely European descent and in all more than 80% of Latin America's European population, which is mostly descended from six groups of immigrants: Italians, Spaniards, Portuguese, French, Germans, Jews (both Ashkenazi and Sephardic) and, to a lesser extent, Irish, Poles, Greeks, Croats, Russians, Welsh, Ukrainians, etc.

In this same period, immigrants came from the Middle East and Asia, including Indians, Lebanese, Syrians, Armenians, and, more recently, Koreans, Chinese and Japanese, mainly to Brazil. These people only make up a small percentage of Latin America's population but they have communities in the major cities.

This diversity has profoundly influenced religion, music and politics. This cultural heritage is called Latino in American English.

== Language ==
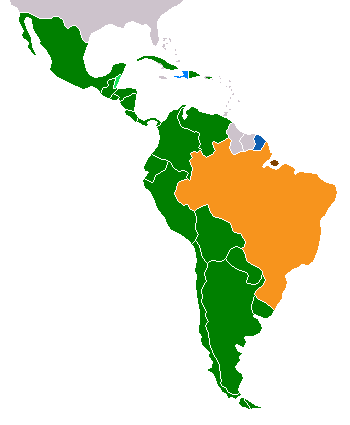
Romance languages in Latin America: Green-Spanish; Orange-Portuguese; Blue-French

Spanish is spoken in Puerto Rico and eighteen sovereign nations (See Spanish language in the Americas). Portuguese is spoken primarily in Brazil (See Brazilian Portuguese). Amerindian languages are spoken in many Latin American nations, mainly Peru, Chile, Panama, Ecuador, Colombia, Guatemala, Bolivia, Paraguay, Argentina, and Mexico. Nahuatl has more than a million speakers in Mexico. Although Mexico has almost 80 native languages across the country, neither the government nor the constitution specifies an official language (not even Spanish). Guaraní is, along with Spanish, the official language of Paraguay, and is spoken by a majority of the population. Furthermore, there are about 10 million Quechua speakers in South America and Spain, but more than half of them live in Bolivia and Peru (approximately 6,700,800 individuals).

Other European languages spoken include Italian in Brazil and Uruguay, German in southern Brazil and southern Chile, and Welsh in southern Argentina.

== Religion ==
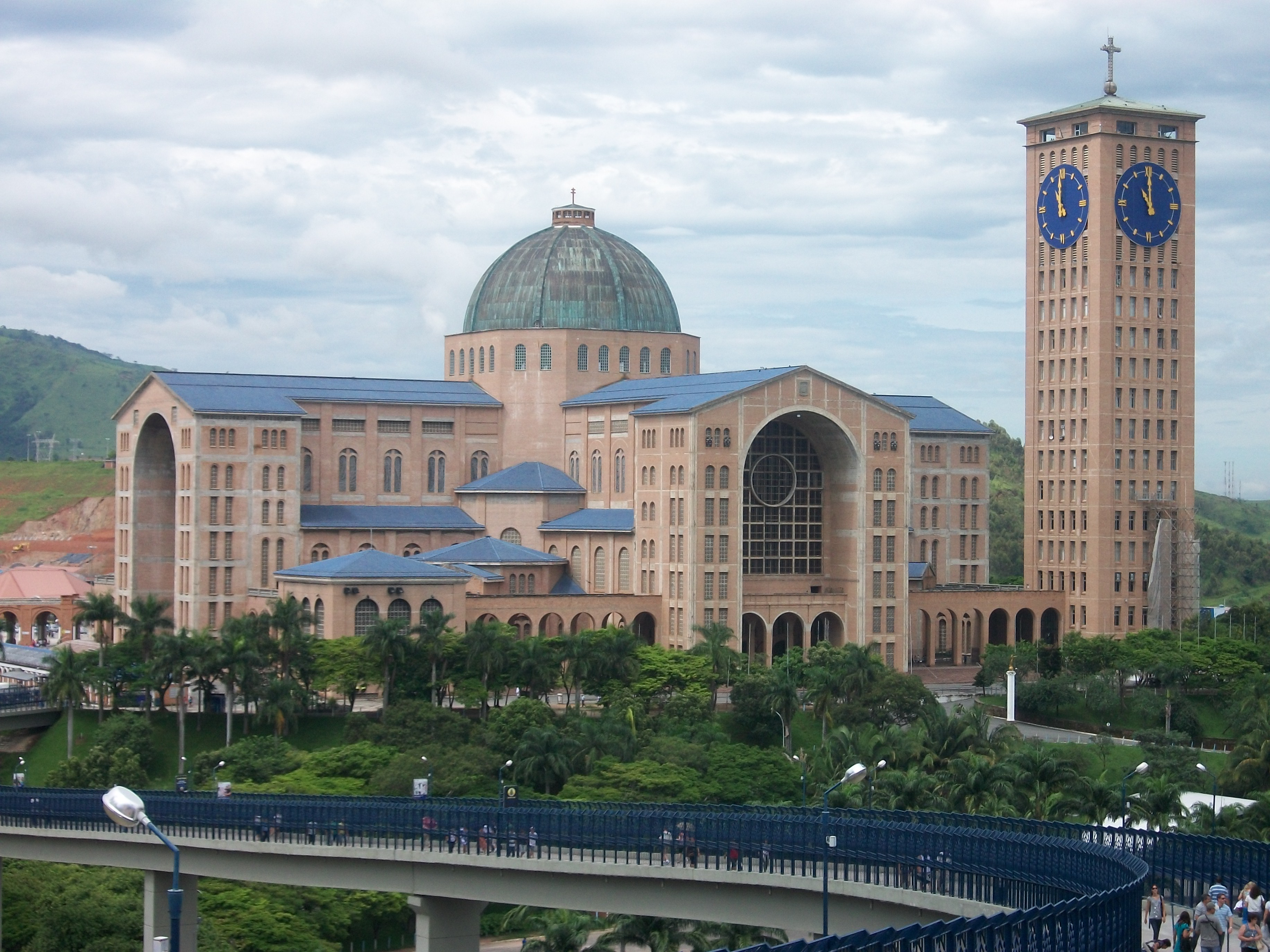
The Basilica of the National Shrine of Our Lady of Aparecida is the second largest in the world, after only of the Basilica of Saint Peter in Vatican City.

The primary religion throughout Latin America is Christianity (90%), mostly Roman Catholicism. Latin America, and in particular Brazil, were active in developing the quasi-socialist Roman Catholic movement known as Liberation Theology. Practitioners of the Protestant, Pentecostal, Evangelical, Jehovah's Witnesses, Mormon, Buddhist, Jewish, Muslim, Hindu, Baháʼí, and indigenous denominations and religions exist. Various Afro-Latin American traditions, such as Santería, and Macumba, a tribal- voodoo religion, are also practiced. Evangelicalism in particular is increasing in popularity. Latin America constitute in absolute terms the second world's largest Christian population, after Europe.

== Arts and leisure ==
In long-term perspective, Britain's influence in Latin America was enormous after independence came in the 1820s. Britain deliberately sought to replace the Spanish and Portuguese in economic and cultural affairs. Military issues and colonization were minor factors. The influence was exerted through diplomacy, trade, banking, and investment in railways and mines. The English language and British cultural norms were transmitted by energetic young British business agents on temporary assignment in the major commercial centers, where they invited locals into the British leisure activities, such as organized sports, and into their transplanted cultural institutions such as schools and clubs. The British role never disappeared, but it faded rapidly after 1914 as the British cashed in their investments to pay for the Great War, and the United States, another Anglophone power, moved into the region with overwhelming force and similar cultural norms.

=== Sports ===
The British impact on sports was overwhelming, as Latin America took up football (called fútbol in Spanish and futebol in Portuguese). In Argentina, rugby, polo, tennis and golf became important middle-class leisure pastimes.

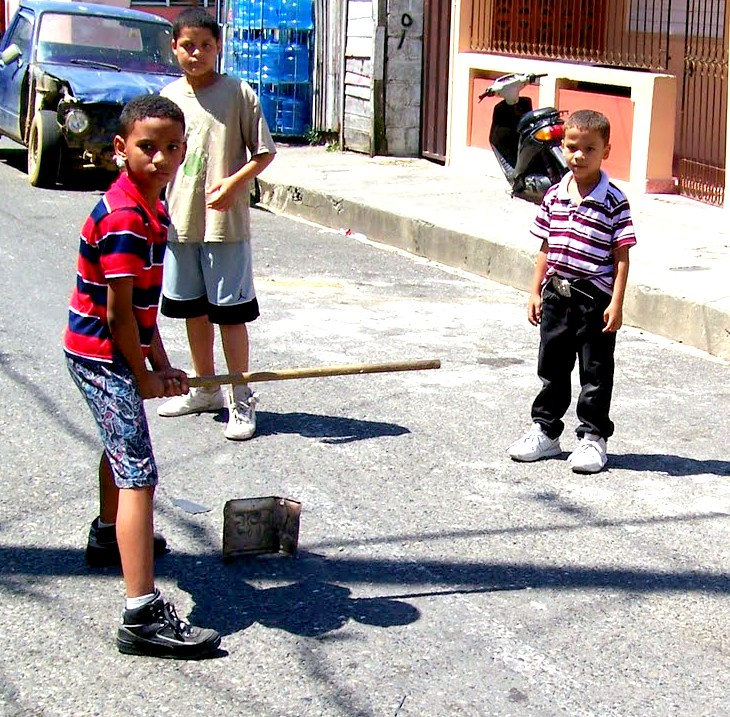
Plaquita, a Dominican street version of cricket. The Dominican Republic was first introduced to cricket through mid-18th century British contact, but switched to baseball after the 1916 American occupation.

In some parts of the Caribbean and Central America baseball outshined soccer in terms of popularity. The sport started in the late 19th century when sugar companies imported cane cutters from the British Caribbean. During their free time, the workers would play cricket, but later, during the long period of US military occupation, cricket gave way to baseball, which rapidly assumed widespread popularity, although cricket remains the favorite in the British Caribbean. Baseball had the greatest following in those nations occupied at length by the US military, especially the Dominican Republic and Cuba, as well as Nicaragua, Panama, and Puerto Rico. Even Venezuela, which wasn't occupied by the US military during this time period, still became a popular baseball destination. All of these countries have emerged as sources of baseball talent, since many players hone their skills on local teams, or in “academies” managed by the US Major Leagues to cultivate the most promising young men for their own teams. Baseball5, an official variation of baseball, was inspired in 2017 by Latin American street variations of baseball as well.

=== Literature ===
Pre-Columbian cultures were primarily oral, though the Aztecs and Mayans, for instance, produced elaborate codices. Oral accounts of mythological and religious beliefs were also sometimes recorded after the arrival of European colonizers, as was the case with the Popol Vuh. Moreover, a tradition of oral narrative survives to this day, for instance among the Quechua-speaking population of Peru and the Quiché of Guatemala.

From the very moment of Europe's "discovery" of the continent, early explorers and conquistadores produced written accounts and crónicas of their experience—such as Columbus's letters or Bernal Díaz del Castillo's description of the conquest of New Spain. During the colonial period, written culture was often in the hands of the church, within which context Sor Juana Inés de la Cruz wrote memorable poetry and philosophical essays. Towards the end of the 18th century and the beginning of the 19th, a distinctive criollo literary tradition emerged, including the first novels such as Lizardi's El Periquillo Sarniento (1816).

The 19th century was a period of "foundational fictions" (in critic Doris Sommer's words), novels in the Romantic or Naturalist traditions that attempted to establish a sense of national identity, and which often focussed on the indigenous question or the dichotomy of "civilization or barbarism" (for which see, say, Domingo Sarmiento's Facundo (1845), Juan León Mera's Cumandá (1879), or Euclides da Cunha's Os Sertões (1902)).

At the turn of the 20th century, modernismo emerged, a poetic movement whose founding text was Rubén Darío's Azul (1888). This was the first Latin American literary movement to influence literary culture outside of the region, and was also the first truly Latin American literature, in that national differences were no longer so much at issue. José Martí, for instance, though a Cuban patriot, also lived in Mexico and the United States and wrote for journals in Argentina and elsewhere.

However, what really put Latin American literature on the global map was no doubt the literary boom of the 1960s and 1970s, distinguished by daring and experimental novels (such as Julio Cortázar's Rayuela (1963)) that were frequently published in Spain and quickly translated into English. The Boom's defining novel was Gabriel García Márquez's Cien años de soledad (1967), which led to the association of Latin American literature with magic realism, though other important writers of the period such as Mario Vargas Llosa and Carlos Fuentes do not fit so easily within this framework. Arguably, the Boom's culmination was Augusto Roa Bastos's monumental Yo, el supremo (1974). In the wake of the Boom, influential precursors such as Juan Rulfo, Alejo Carpentier, and above all Jorge Luis Borges were also rediscovered.

Contemporary literature in the region is varied, ranging from the best-selling Paulo Coelho and Isabel Allende to the more avant-garde and critically acclaimed work of writers such as Giannina Braschi, Diamela Eltit, Ricardo Piglia, Roberto Bolaño or Daniel Sada. There has also been considerable attention paid to the genre of testimony, texts produced in collaboration with subaltern subjects such as Rigoberta Menchú. Finally, a new breed of chroniclers is represented by journalistic authors such as Carlos Monsiváis and Pedro Lemebel.

The region boasts six Nobel Prizewinners: in addition to the Colombian García Márquez (1982), also the Chilean poet Gabriela Mistral (1945), the Guatemalan novelist Miguel Ángel Asturias (1967), the Chilean poet Pablo Neruda (1971), the Mexican poet and essayist Octavio Paz (1990), and the Peruvian writer Mario Vargas Llosa (2010).

=== Philosophy ===
The history of Latin American philosophy is usefully divided into five periods: Pre-Columbian, Colonial, Independentist, Nationalist, and Contemporary (that is, the twentieth century to the present).

Among the major Latin American philosophers is Sor Juana Inés de la Cruz (Mexico, 1651–1695), a philosopher, composer, poet of the Baroque period, and Hieronymite nun of New Spain (Mexico). Sor Juana was the first philosopher to question the status of the woman in Latin American society. When Catholic Church official instructed Sor Juana to abandon intellectual pursuits that were improper for a woman, Sor Juana's extensive answer defends rational equality between men and women, makes a powerful case for women's right to education, and develops an understanding of wisdom as a form of self-realization.

Among the most prominent political philosophers in Latin America was José Martí's (Cuba 1854–1895), who pioneered Cuban liberal thought that lead to the Cuban War of Independence. Elsewhere in Latin America, during the 1870-1930 period, the philosophy of positivism or "cientificismo" associated with Auguste Comte in France and Herbert Spencer in England exerted an influence on intellectuals, experts and writers in the region. Francisco Romero (Argentina 1891–1962) coined the phrase 'philosophical normality' in 1940, in reference to philosophical thinking as 'an ordinary function of culture in Hispanic America.' Other Latin American philosophers of his era include Alejandro Korn (Argentina, 1860–1936), who authored 'The Creative Freedom' and José Vasconcelos (Mexico, 1882–1959), whose work spans metaphysics, aesthetics, and the philosophy of 'the Mexican'. Poet, philosopher, and essayist Octavio Paz (1914-1998) was a Mexican diplomat, philosopher, and poet, and winner of the Nobel Prize in Literature in 1990. Paz who is one of the most influential writers on Latin American and Spanish culture from Sor Juana to Remedios Varos. More recent Latin American philosophers who practice Latina/o or Latino philosophy include: Walter Mignolo (1941-), Gloria Anzaldúa (1942), Maria Lugones (1948-), and Susana Nuccetelli (1954) from Argentina; Jorge J. E. Gracia (1942), Gustavo Pérez Firmat (1949) and Ofelia Schutte (1944) from Cuba; Linda Martín Alcoff (1955) from Panama; Giannina Braschi (1953) from Puerto Rico; and Eduardo Mendieta (1963) from Colombia. Their formats and styles of Latino philosophical writing differ greatly as the subject matters. Walter Mignolo's book "The Idea of Latin America" expounds on how the idea of Latin America and Latin American philosopher, as a precursor to Latino philosophy, was formed and propagated. Giannina Braschi's writings on Puerto Rican independence focus on financial terrorism, debt, and “feardom”.

Latina/o philosophy is a tradition of thought referring both to the work of many Latina/o philosophers in the United States and to a specific set of philosophical problems and method of questioning that relate to Latina/o identity as a hyphenated experience, borders, immigration, gender, race and ethnicity, feminism, and decoloniality. “Latina/o philosophy” is used by some to refer also to Latin American philosophy practiced within Latin America and the United States, while others argue that to maintain specificity Latina/o philosophy should only refer to a subset of Latin American philosophy.

=== Music ===
Latin American music comes in many varieties, from the simple, rural conjunto music of northern Mexico to the sophisticated habanera of Cuba, from the symphonies of Heitor Villa-Lobos to the simple and moving Andean flute. Music has played an important part in Latin America's turbulent recent history, for example the nueva canción movement. Latin music is very diverse, with the only truly unifying thread being the use of the Spanish language or, in Brazil, the similar Portuguese language.

Latin America can be divided into several musical areas. Andean music, for example, includes the countries of western South America, typically Argentina, Colombia, Peru, Bolivia, Ecuador, Chile and Venezuela; Central American music includes Nicaragua, El Salvador, Guatemala, Honduras, and Costa Rica. Caribbean music includes the Caribbean coast of Colombia, Panama, and Spanish-speaking islands in the Caribbean, including the Dominican Republic, Cuba, and Puerto Rico. Brazil perhaps constitutes its own musical area, both because of its large size and incredible diversity as well as its unique history as a Portuguese colony. Musically, Latin America has also influenced its former colonial metropoles. Spanish music (and Portuguese music) and Latin American music strongly cross-fertilized each other, but Latin music also absorbed influences from the English-speaking world, as well as African music.

One of the main characteristics of Latin American music is its diversity, from the lively rhythms of Central America and the Caribbean to the more austere sounds of southern South America. Another feature of Latin American music is its original blending of the variety of styles that arrived in the Americas and became influential, from the early Spanish and European Baroque to the different beats of the African rhythms.

Latino-Caribbean music, such as salsa, merengue, bachata, etc., are styles of music that have been strongly influenced by African rhythms and melodies.

Other musical genres of Latin America include the Argentine and Uruguayan tango, the Colombian cumbia and vallenato, Mexican ranchera, the Cuban salsa, bolero, rumba and mambo, Nicaraguan palo de mayo, Uruguayan candombe, the Panamanian cumbia, tamborito, saloma and pasillo, and the various styles of music from Pre-Columbian traditions that are widespread in the Andean region. In Brazil, samba, American jazz, European classical music and choro combined into bossa nova.

The classical composer Heitor Villa-Lobos (1887–1959) worked on the recording of native musical traditions within his homeland of Brazil. The traditions of his homeland heavily influenced his classical works. Also notable is the much recent work of the Cuban Leo Brouwer and guitar work of the Venezuelan Antonio Lauro and the Paraguayan Agustín Barrios.

Folklore music has played a significant role in the musical traditions of Latin America and the Caribbean, reflecting the region’s diverse cultural identities and heritage Musicians such as Atahualpa Yupanqui, Violeta Parra, Víctor Jara, Mercedes Sosa, Jorge Negrete, Caetano Veloso, Yma Sumac and others have contributed to the development and international recognition of these musical traditions. Contemporary artists such as the Uruguayan musician Jorge Drexler, have also achieved international recognition by becoming the first Latin American to win the Academy Award for Best Original Song.

Latin pop, including many forms of rock, is popular in Latin America today (see Spanish language rock and roll).

=== Film ===
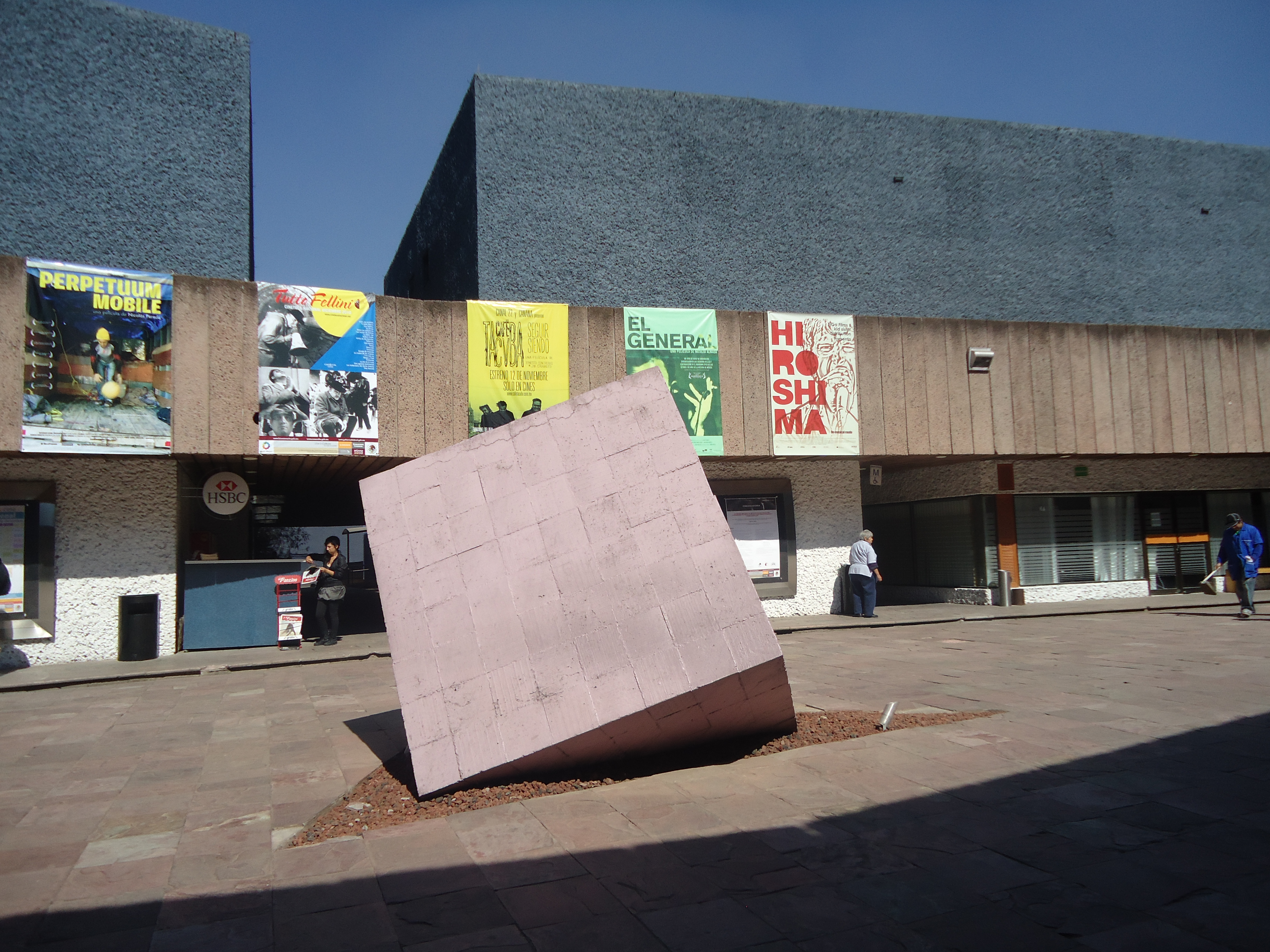
The Cineteca Nacional in Mexico

Latin American film is both rich and diverse. But the main centers of production have been Mexico, Argentina, Brazil, and Cuba.

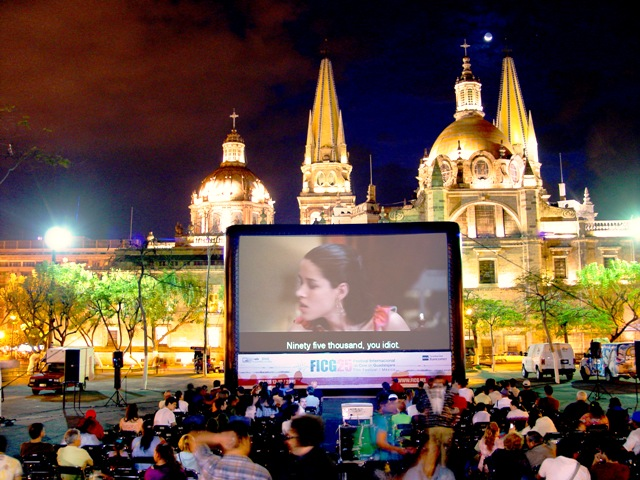
The Guadalajara International Film Festival is considered the most prestigious film festival in Latin America.

Latin American cinema flourished after the introduction of sound, which added a linguistic barrier to the export of Hollywood film south of the border. The 1950s and 1960s saw a movement towards Third Cinema, led by the Argentine filmmakers Fernando Solanas and Octavio Getino. More recently, a new style of directing and stories filmed has been tagged as "New Latin American Cinema."

Mexican movies from the Golden Era in the 1940s are significant examples of Latin American cinema, with a huge industry comparable to the Hollywood of those years. More recently movies such as Amores Perros (2000) and Y tu mamá también (2001) have been successful in creating universal stories about contemporary subjects, and were internationally recognised. Nonetheless, the country has also witnessed the rise of experimental filmmakers such as Carlos Reygadas and Fernando Eimbicke who focus on more universal themes and characters. Other important Mexican directors are Arturo Ripstein and Guillermo del Toro.

Argentine cinema was a big industry in the first half of the 20th century. After a series of military governments that shackled culture in general, the industry re-emerged after the 1976–1983 military dictatorship to produce the Academy Award winner The Official Story in 1985. The Argentine economic crisis affected the production of films in the late 1990s and early 2000s, but many Argentine movies produced during those years were internationally acclaimed, including Plata Quemada (2000), Nueve reinas (2000), El abrazo partido (2004) and Roma (2004).

In Brazilian cinema, the Cinema Novo movement created a particular way of making movies with critical and intellectual screenplays, a clearer photography related to the light of the outdoors in a tropical landscape, and a political message. The modern Brazilian film industry has become more profitable inside the country, and some of its productions have received prizes and recognition in Europe and the United States. Movies like Central do Brasil (1999) and Cidade de Deus (2003) have fans around the world, and its directors have taken part in American and European film projects.

Cuban cinema has enjoyed much official support since the Cuban revolution, and important filmmakers include Tomás Gutiérrez Alea.

=== Modern dance ===
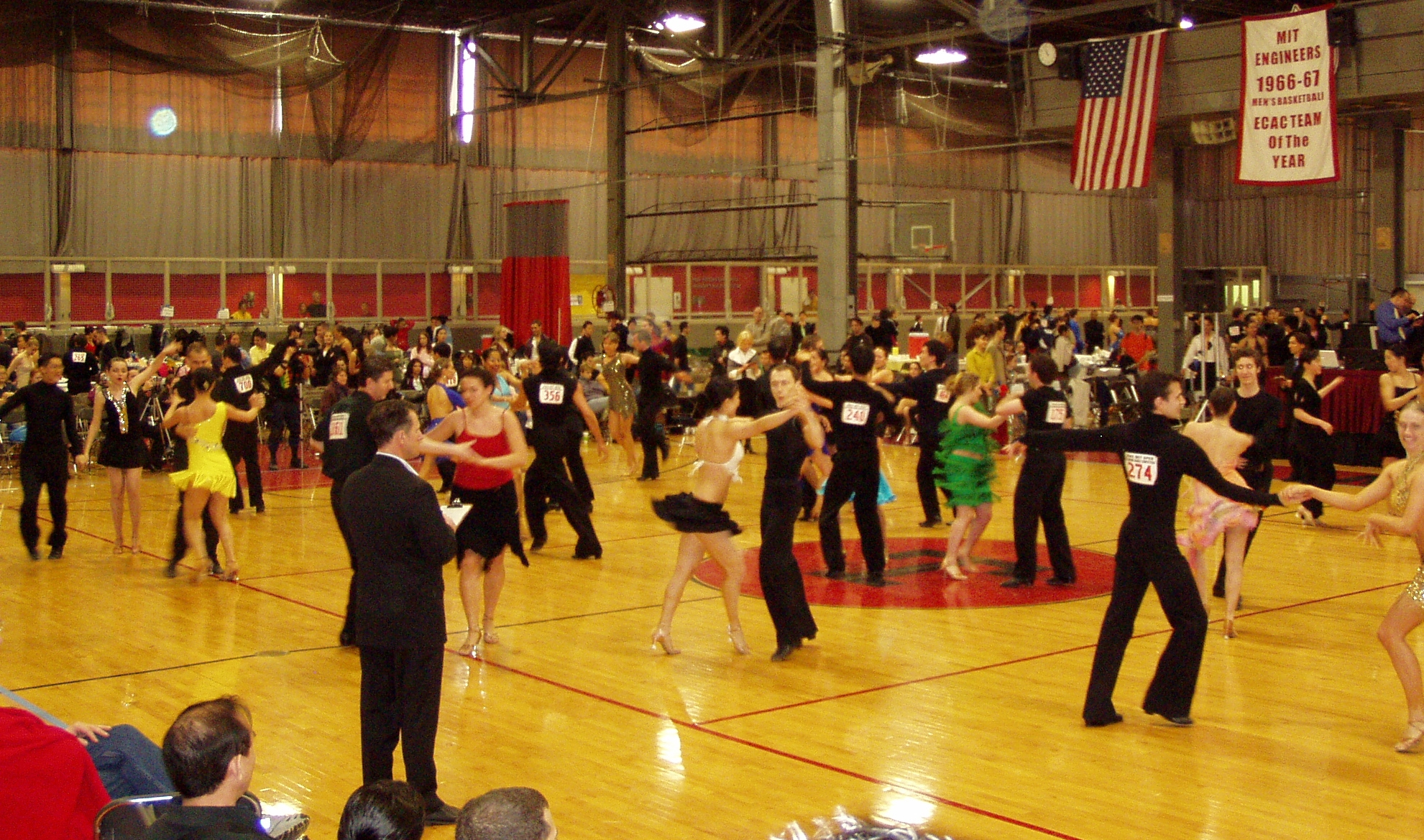
Intermediate level international-style Latin dancing at the 2006 MIT ballroom dance competition. A judge stands in the foreground.

Latin America has a strong tradition of evolving dance styles. Some of its dance and music is considered to emphasize sexuality, and have become popular outside of their countries of origin. Salsa and the more popular Latin dances were created and embraced into the culture in the early and middle 1900s and have since been able to retain their significance both in and outside the Americas. The mariachi bands of Mexico stirred up quick paced rhythms and playful movements at the same time that Cuba embraced similar musical and dance styles. Traditional dances were blended with new, modern ways of moving, evolving into a blended, more contemporary forms.

Latin American dance instruction is widely offered across ballroom dance studios, and styles such as the cha-cha-chá have also been integrated into country-western venues. Miami serves as a primary center for Latin dance culture in the United States, influenced by its large Cuban and Puerto Rican populations, where street music and dancing are prominent aspects of public life.

Some of the dances of Latin America are derived from and named for the type of music they are danced to. For example, mambo, salsa, cha-cha-cha, rumba, merengue, samba, flamenco, bachata, and, probably most recognizable, the tango are among the most popular. Each of the types of music has specific steps that go with the music, the counts, the rhythms, and the style.

Modern Latin American dancing is very energetic. These dances primarily are performed with a partner as a social dance, but solo variations exist. The dances emphasize passionate hip movements and the connection between partners. Many of the dances are done in a close embrace while others are more traditional and similar to ballroom dancing, holding a stronger frame between the partners.

=== Theatre ===
Theatre in Latin America existed before the Europeans came to the continent. The natives of Latin America had their own rituals, festivals, and ceremonies. They involved dance, singing of poetry, song, theatrical skits, mime, acrobatics, and magic shows. The performers were trained; they wore costumes, masks, makeup, wigs. Platforms had been erected to enhance visibility. The 'sets' were decorated with branches from trees and other natural objects.

The Europeans used this to their advantage. For the first fifty years after the Conquest the missionaries used theatre widely to spread the Christian doctrine to a population accustomed to the visual and oral quality of spectacle and thus maintaining a form of cultural hegemony. It was more effective to use the indigenous forms of communication than to put an end to the 'pagan' practices, the conquerors took out the content of the spectacles, retained the trappings, and used them to convey their own message.

Pre-Columbian rituals were how the indigenous came in contact with the divine. Spaniards used plays to Christianize and colonize the indigenous peoples of the Americas in the 16th century. Theatre was a potent tool in manipulating a population already accustomed to spectacle. Theatre became a tool for political hold on Latin America by colonialist theatre by using indigenous performance practices to manipulate the population.

Theatre provided a way for the indigenous people were forced to participate in the drama of their own defeat. In 1599, the Jesuits even used cadavers of Native Americans to portray the dead in the staging of the final judgment.

While the plays were promoting a new sacred order, their first priority was to support the new secular, political order. Theatre under the colonizers primarily at the service of the administration.

After the large decrease in the native population, the indigenous consciousness and identity in theatre disappeared, though pieces did have indigenous elements to them. The theatre that progressed in Latin America is argued to be theatre that the conquerors brought to the Americas, not the theatre of the Americas.

Progression in Postcolonial Latin American Theatre

Internal strife and external interference have been the drive behind Latin American history which applies the same to theatre.

1959–1968: dramaturgical structures and structures of social projects leaned more toward constructing a more native Latin American base called the "Nuestra America".

1968–1974: theatre tries to claim a more homogenous definition which brings in more European models. At this point, Latin American Theatre tried to connect to its historical roots.

1974–1984: the search for expression rooted in the history of Latin America became victims of exile and death.

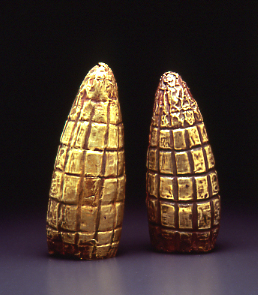
Gold maize. Moche culture 300 AD, Larco Museum, Lima, Peru.

=== Latin American cuisine ===
Latin American cuisine refers to the typical foods, beverages, and cooking styles common to many of the countries and cultures in Latin America. Latin America is a very diverse region with cuisines that vary from nation to nation.

Some items typical of Latin American cuisine include maize-based dishes and drinks (tortillas, tamales, arepas, pupusas, chicha morada, chicha de jora) and various salsas and other condiments (guacamole, pico de gallo, mole). These spices are generally what give the Latin American cuisines a distinct flavor; yet, each country of Latin America tends to use a different spice and those that share spices tend to use them at different quantities. Thus, this leads to a variety across the land. Meat is also widely consumed, and constitutes one of the main ingredients in many Latin American countries where they are considered specialties, referred to as Asado or Churrasco.

Latin American beverages are just as distinct as their foods. Some of the beverages can even date back to the times of the Native Americans. Some popular beverages include mate, Pisco Sour, horchata, chicha, atole, cacao and aguas frescas.

Desserts in Latin America include dulce de leche, alfajor, arroz con leche, tres leches cake, Teja and flan.

== Regional cultures ==
=== North America ===
==== Mexico ====
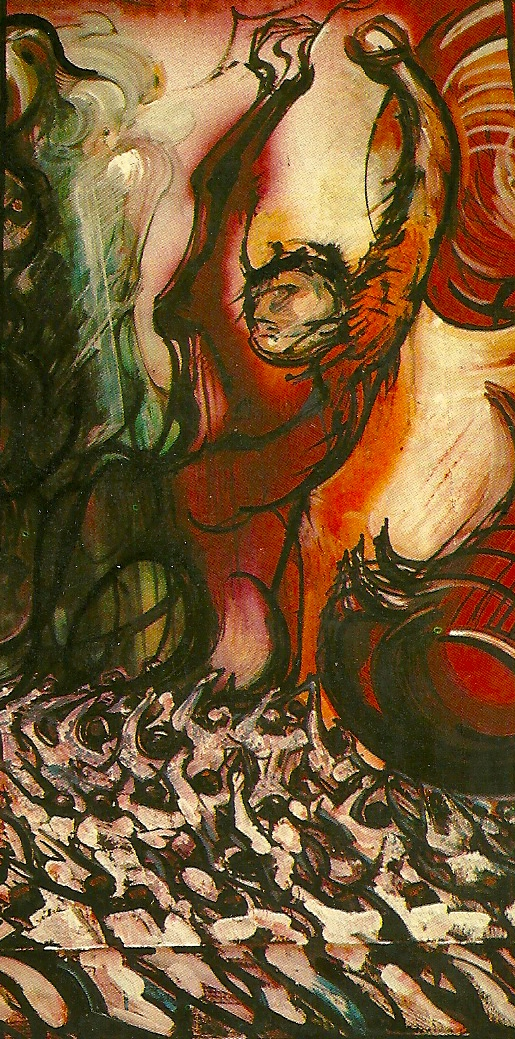
La Marcha de la Humanidad

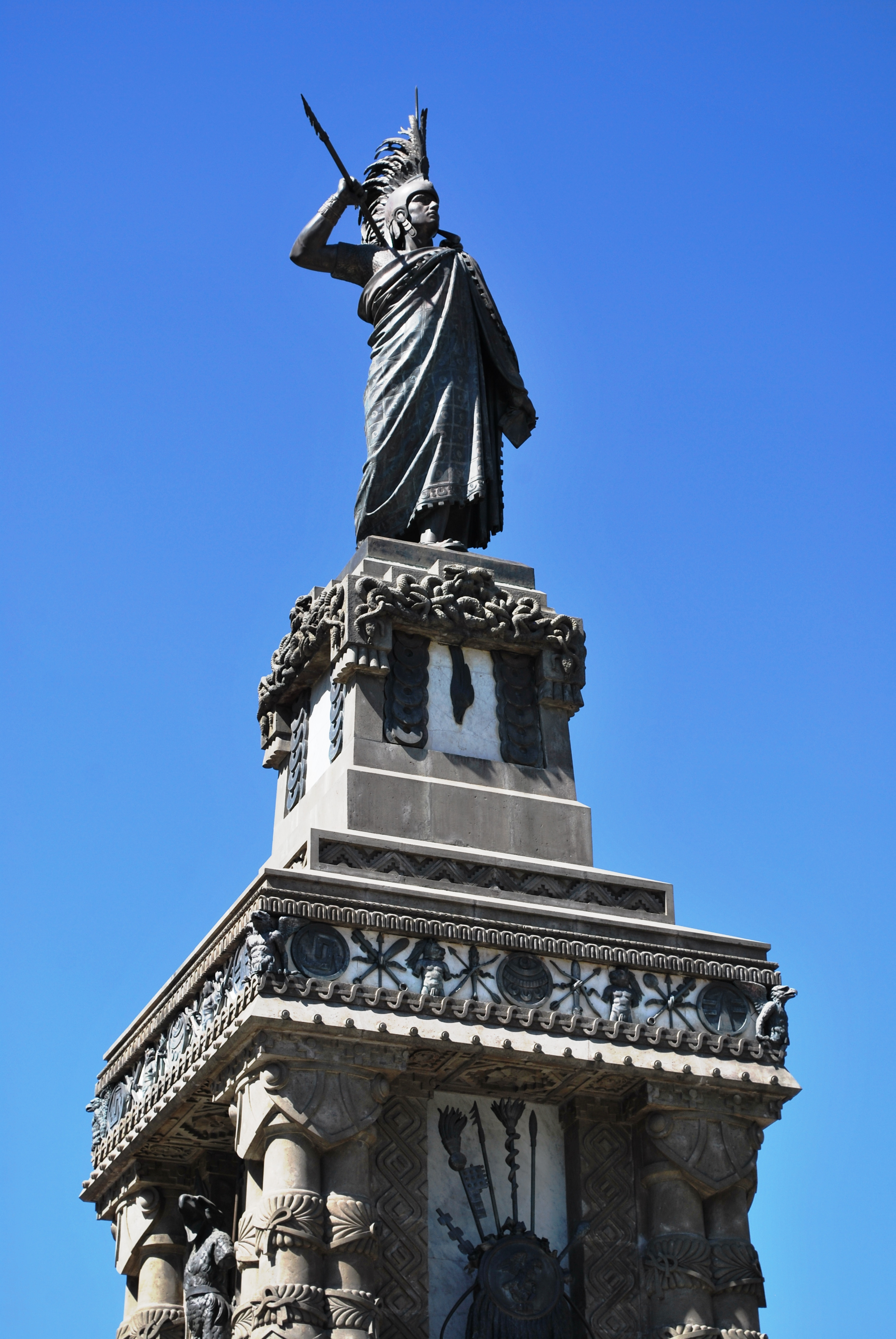
Monument to Cuauhtémoc, Mexico City

Historically, Mexicans have struggled with the creation of a united identity. This particular issue is the main topic of Mexican Nobel Prize winner Octavio Paz's 1950 book The Labyrinth of Solitude. Mexico is a large country with a large population, therefore having many cultural traits found only in some parts of the country. Northern Mexico is the least culturally diverse region due to its very low Native American population and high density of those of European descent. Northern Mexicans are also more Americanized due to the common border with the United States. Central and southern Mexico is where many well-known traditions find their origin, therefore the people from this area are in a way the most traditional, but their collective personality cannot be generalized. People from Puebla, for instance, are thought to be conservative and reserved, and just in the neighboring state of Veracruz, people have the fame of being outgoing and liberal. Chilangos (Mexico City natives) are believed to be a bit aggressive and self-centered. The regiomontanos (citizens from Monterrey) are thought to be rather proud and miserly, regardless of their social status. Almost every Mexican state has its own accent, making it fairly easy to distinguish the origin of someone by their use of language.

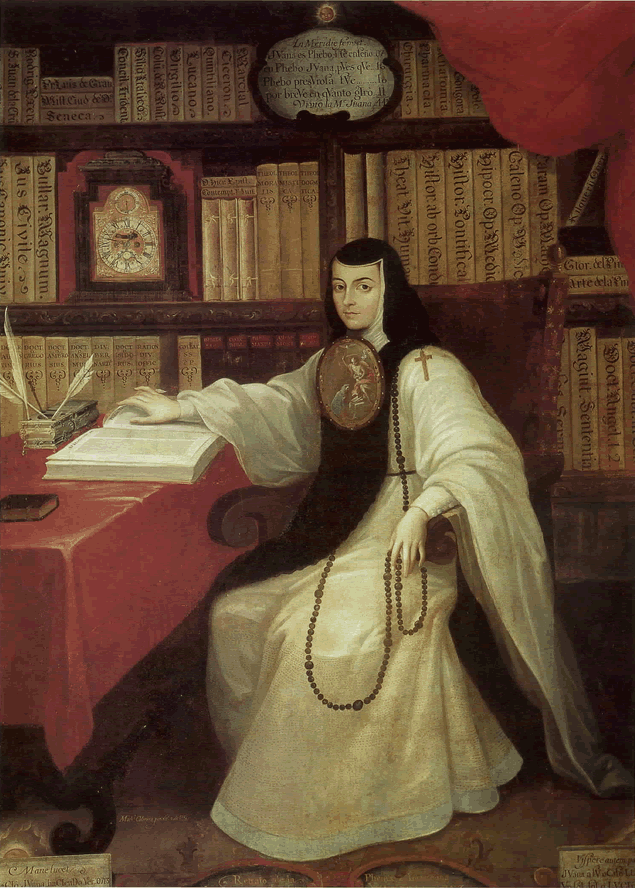
A late 18th-century painting of Sor Juana Inés de la Cruz, Mexican poet and writer

The literature of Mexico has its antecedents in the literature of the indigenous settlements of Mesoamerica and European literature. The most well-known prehispanic poet is Netzahualcoyotl. Outstanding colonial writers and poets include Juan Ruiz de Alarcón and Sor Juana Inés de la Cruz. The first novel to be written and published in Latin America is generally considered to be José Joaquín Fernández de Lizardi's The Mangy Parrot (serialized from 1816 to 1831).

Other notable Mexican writers include poets such as Octavio Paz (Nobel Laureate), Xavier Villaurrutia, and Ramón López Velarde, as well as prose writers such as Alfonso Reyes, Ignacio Manuel Altamirano, Nellie Campobello, Juan José Arreola, Carlos Fuentes, Agustín Yáñez, Elena Garro, Mariano Azuela, Juan Rulfo, Amparo Dávila, Jorge Ibargüengoitia, Guadalupe Dueñas, Bruno Traven and Fernando del Paso, and playwrights such as Maruxa Vilalta and Rodolfo Usigli. Contemporary Mexican authors include Álvaro Enrigue, Daniel Sada, Guadalupe Nettel, Juan Villoro, Jorge Volpi and Fernanda Melchor.

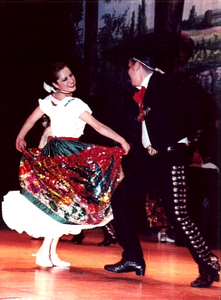
Jarabe Tapatío in the traditional China Poblana dress

The music of Mexico is very diverse and features a wide range of musical genres and performance styles. It has been influenced by a variety of cultures, most notably the culture of the indigenous people of Mexico and Europe. Music was an expression of Mexican nationalism, beginning in the nineteenth century.

Prior to the foundation of Mexico as a nation-state, the original inhabitants of the land used drums (such as the teponaztli), flutes, rattles, conches as trumpets and their voices to make music and dances. This ancient music is still played in some parts of Mexico. However, much of the traditional contemporary music of Mexico was written during and after the Spanish colonial period, using many old world influenced instruments. Many traditional instruments, such as the Mexican vihuela used in Mariachi music, were adapted from their old world predecessors and are traditionally considered Mexican. Popular music genres include son huasteco, ranchera, Mexican bolero, mariachi, corrido, banda, and música norteña. Notable musicians and songwriters include José Mariano Elízaga, Juventino Rosas, Agustín Lara and José Alfredo Jiménez.

Mexicans in places like Guadalajara, Puebla, Monterrey, Mexico City, and most middle-sized cities, enjoy a great variety of options for leisure. Shopping centers are a favorite among families, since there has been an increasing number of new malls that cater to people of all ages and interests. A large number of them, have multiplex cinemas, international and local restaurants, food courts, cafes, bars, bookstores and most of the international renowned clothing brands are found too. Mexicans are prone to travel within their own country, making short weekend trips to a neighbouring city or town.

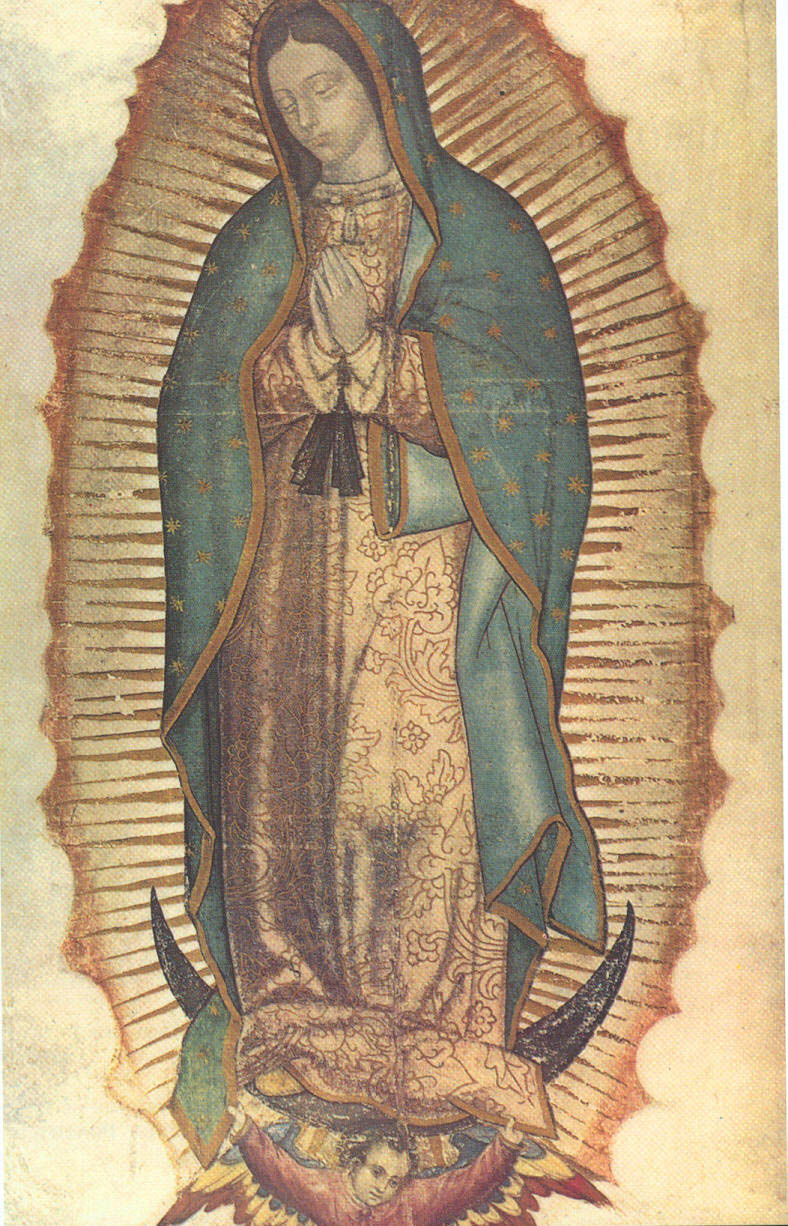
An image of Our Lady of Guadalupe, patron saint of Mexico

The standard of living in Mexico is higher than most of the other countries in Latin America attracting migrants in search for better opportunities. With the recent economic growth, many high-income families live in single houses, commonly found within a gated community, called "fraccionamiento". The reason these places are the most popular among the middle and upper classes is that they offer a sense of security and provide social status. Swimming pools or golf clubs, and/or some other commodities are found in these fraccionamientos. Poorer Mexicans, by contrast, live a harsh life, although they share the importance they grant to family, friends and cultural habits.

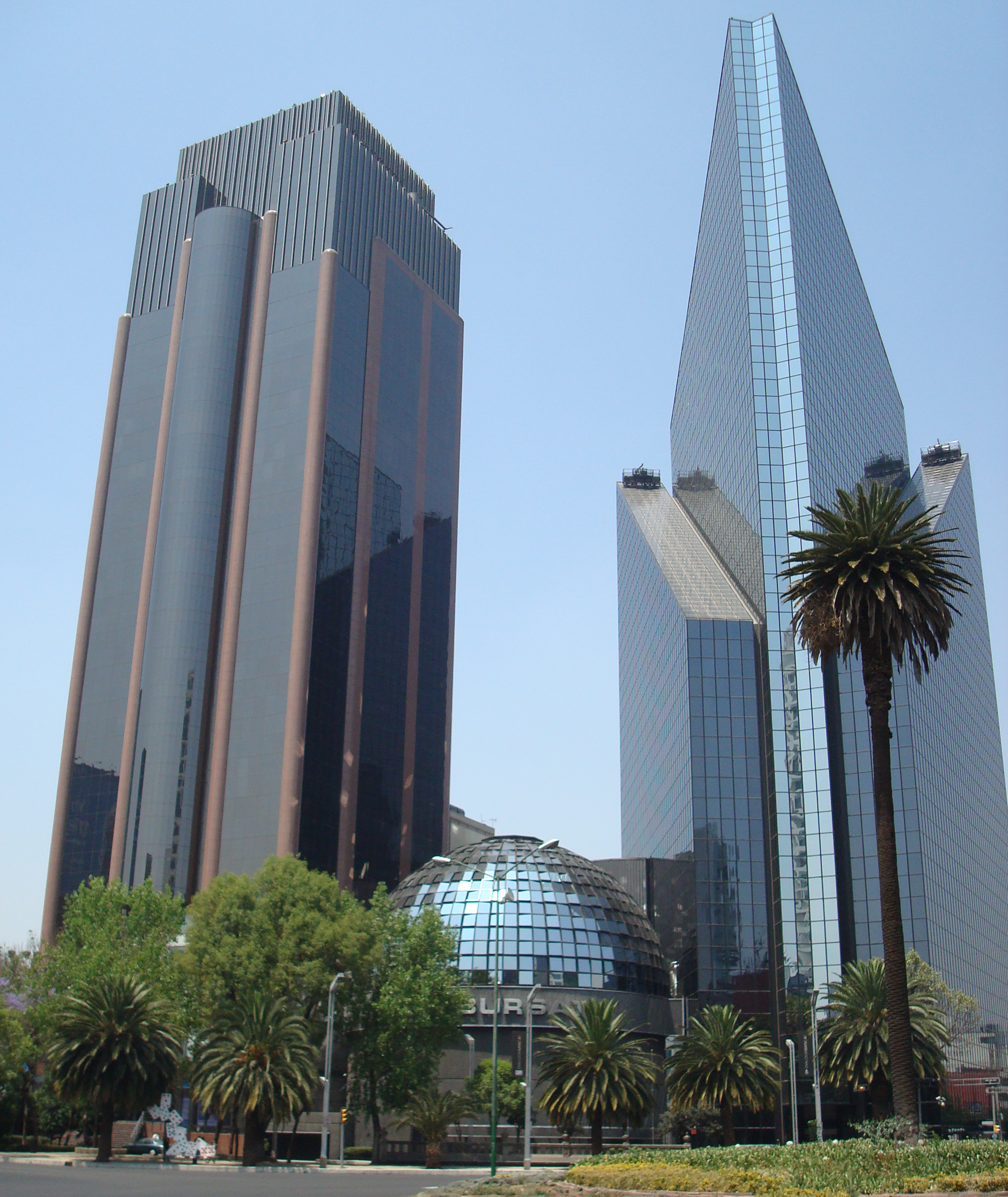
Mexican Stock Exchange

Two of the major television networks based in Mexico are Televisa and TV Azteca. Soap operas (telenovelas) are translated to many languages and seen all over the world with renown names like Verónica Castro, Lucía Méndez, Lucero, and Thalía. Even Gael García Bernal and Diego Luna from Y tu mamá también and current Zegna model act in some of them. Some of their TV shows are modeled after American counterparts like Family Feud (100 Mexicanos Dijeron or "A hundred Mexicans said" in Spanish), Big Brother, American Idol, Saturday Night Live and others. Nationwide news shows like Las Noticias por Adela on Televisa resemble a hybrid between Donahue and Nightline. Local news shows are modeled after American counterparts like the Eyewitness News and Action News formats.

Mexico's national sports are charreria and bullfighting. Pre-Columbian cultures played a ball game which still exists in Northwest Mexico (Sinaloa, the game is called Ulama), though it is not a popular sport anymore. A considerable portion of the Mexican population enjoys watching bullfights. Almost all large cities have bullrings. Mexico City has the largest bullring in the world, which seats 55,000 people. But the favorite sport remains football (soccer) while baseball is popular buts more specifically in the northern states (possibly because of the American influence), and a number of Mexicans have become stars in the US Major Leagues. Professional wrestling is shown on shows like Lucha Libre. American football is practiced at the major universities like UNAM. Basketball has also been gaining popularity, with a number of Mexican players having been drafted to play in the National Basketball Association.

=== Central America ===
==== Guatemala ====
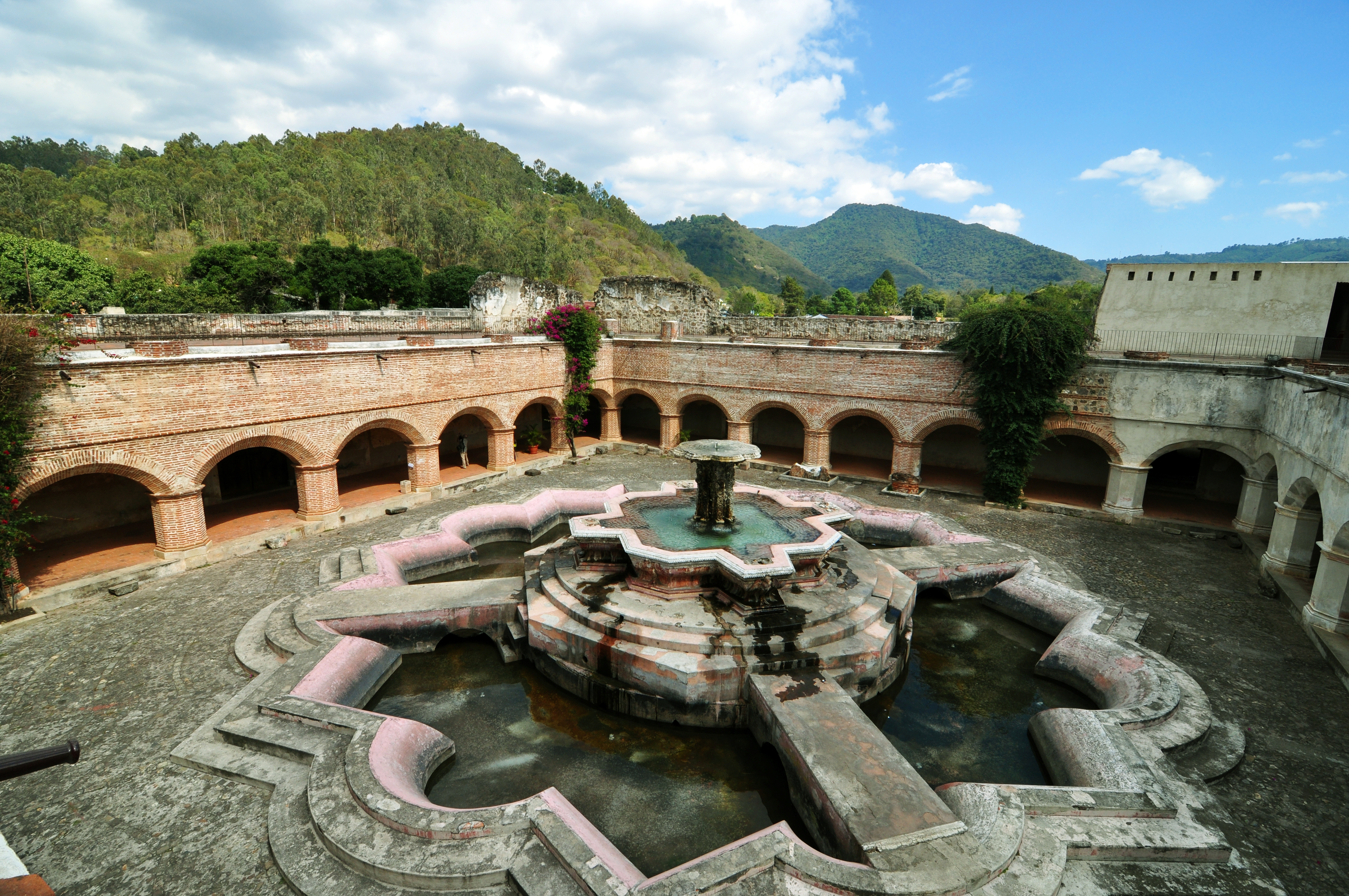
The fountain of "Nuestra Señora de la Merced", Antigua Guatemala

The culture of Guatemala reflects strong Mayan and Spanish influences and continues to be defined as a contrast between poor Mayan villagers in the rural highlands, and the urbanized and wealthy mestizos population who occupy the cities and surrounding agricultural plains.

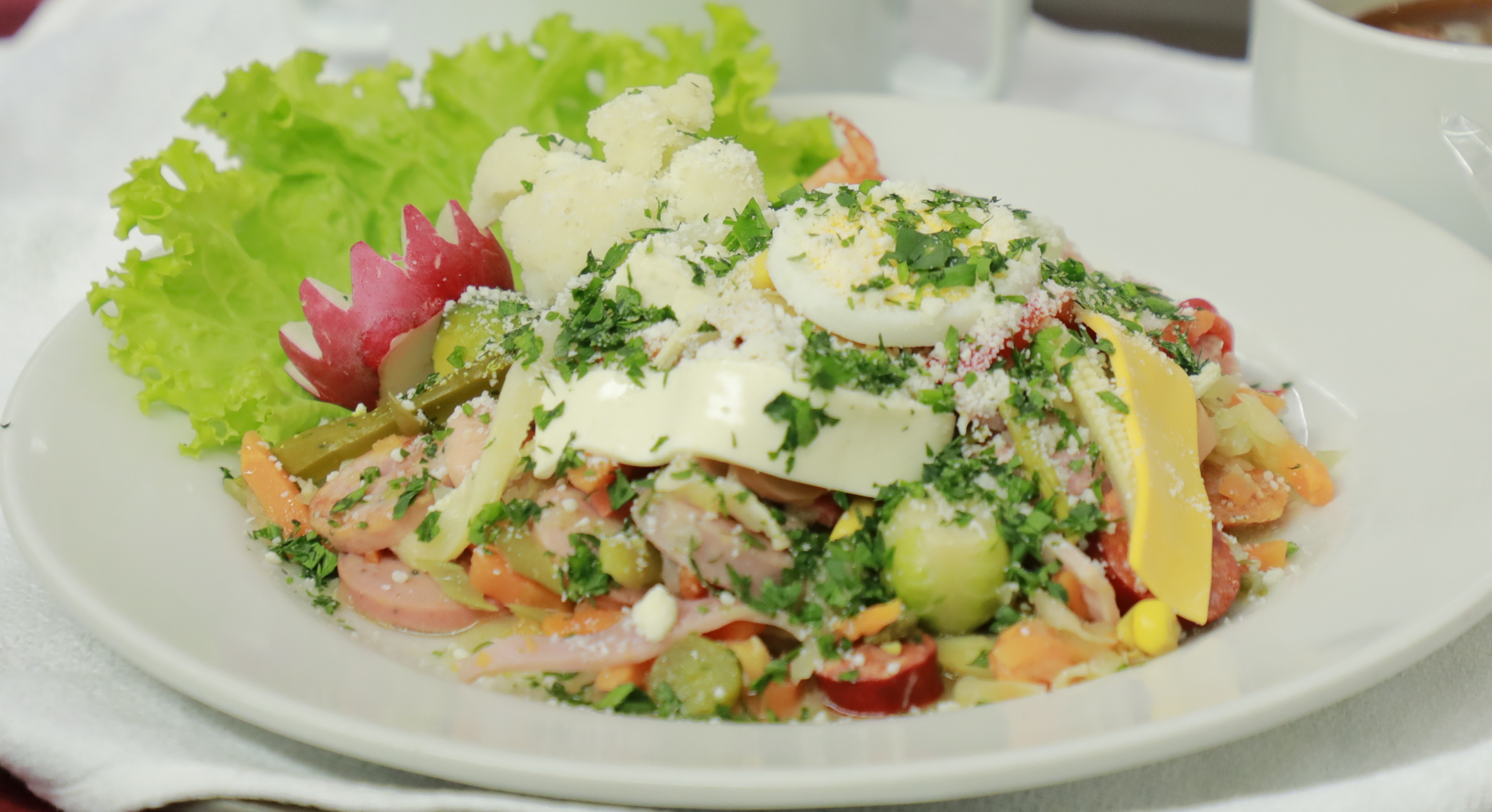
Fiambre, Guatemalan traditional dish, eaten on November 1, the Day of the Dead

The cuisine of Guatemala reflects the multicultural nature of Guatemala, in that it involves food that differs in taste depending on the region. Guatemala has 22 departments (or divisions), each of which has very different food varieties. For example, Antigua Guatemala is well known for its candy which makes use of many local ingredients fruits, seeds and nuts along with honey, condensed milk and other traditional sweeteners. Antigua's candy is very popular when tourists visit the country for the first time and is a great choice in the search for new and interesting flavors. Many traditional foods are based on Maya cuisine and prominently feature corn, chiles and beans as key ingredients. Various dishes may have the same name as a dish from a neighboring country, but may in fact be quite different for example the enchilada or quesadilla, which are nothing like their Mexican counterparts.

The music of Guatemala is diverse. Guatemala's national instrument is the marimba, an idiophone from the family of the xylophones, which is played all over the country, even in the remotest corners. Towns also have wind and percussion bands -week processions, as well as on other occasions. The Garifuna people of Afro-Caribbean descent, who are spread thinly on the northeastern Caribbean coast, have their own distinct varieties of popular and folk music. Cumbia, from the Colombian variety, is also very popular especially among the lower classes. Dozens of Rock bands have emerged in the last two decades, making rock music quite popular among young people. Guatemala also has an almost five-century-old tradition of art music, spanning from the first liturgical chant and polyphony introduced in 1524 to contemporary art music. Much of the music composed in Guatemala from the 16th century to the 19th century has only recently been unearthed by scholars and is being revived by performers.

Guatemalan literature is famous around the world whether in the indigenous languages present in the country or in Spanish. Though there was likely literature in Guatemala before the arrival of the Spanish, all the texts that exist today were written after their arrival. The Popol Vuh is the most significant work of Guatemalan literature in the Quiché language, and one of the most important of Pre-Columbian American literature. It is a compendium of Mayan stories and legends, aimed to preserve Mayan traditions. The first known version of this text dates from the 16th century and is written in Quiché transcribed in Latin characters. It was translated into Spanish by the Dominican priest Francisco Ximénez in the beginning of the 18th century. Due to its combination of historical, mythical, and religious elements, it has been called the Mayan Bible. It is a vital document for understanding the culture of pre-Columbian America. The Rabinal Achí is a dramatic work consisting of dance and text that is preserved as it was originally represented. It is thought to date from the 15th century and narrates the mythical and dynastic origins of the Kek'chi' people and their relationships with neighboring peoples. The Rabinal Achí is performed during the Rabinal festival of January 25, the day of Saint Paul. It was declared a masterpiece of oral tradition of humanity by UNESCO in 2005. The 16th century saw the first native-born Guatemalan writers that wrote in Spanish. Major writers of this era include Sor Juana de Maldonado, considered the first poet-playwright of colonial Central America, and the historian Francisco Antonio de Fuentes y Guzmán. The Jesuit Rafael Landívar (1731–1793) is considered as the first great Guatemalan poet. He was forced into exile by Carlos III. He traveled to Mexico and later to Italy, where he died. He originally wrote his Rusticatio Mexicana and his poems praising the bishop Figueredo y Victoria in Latin.

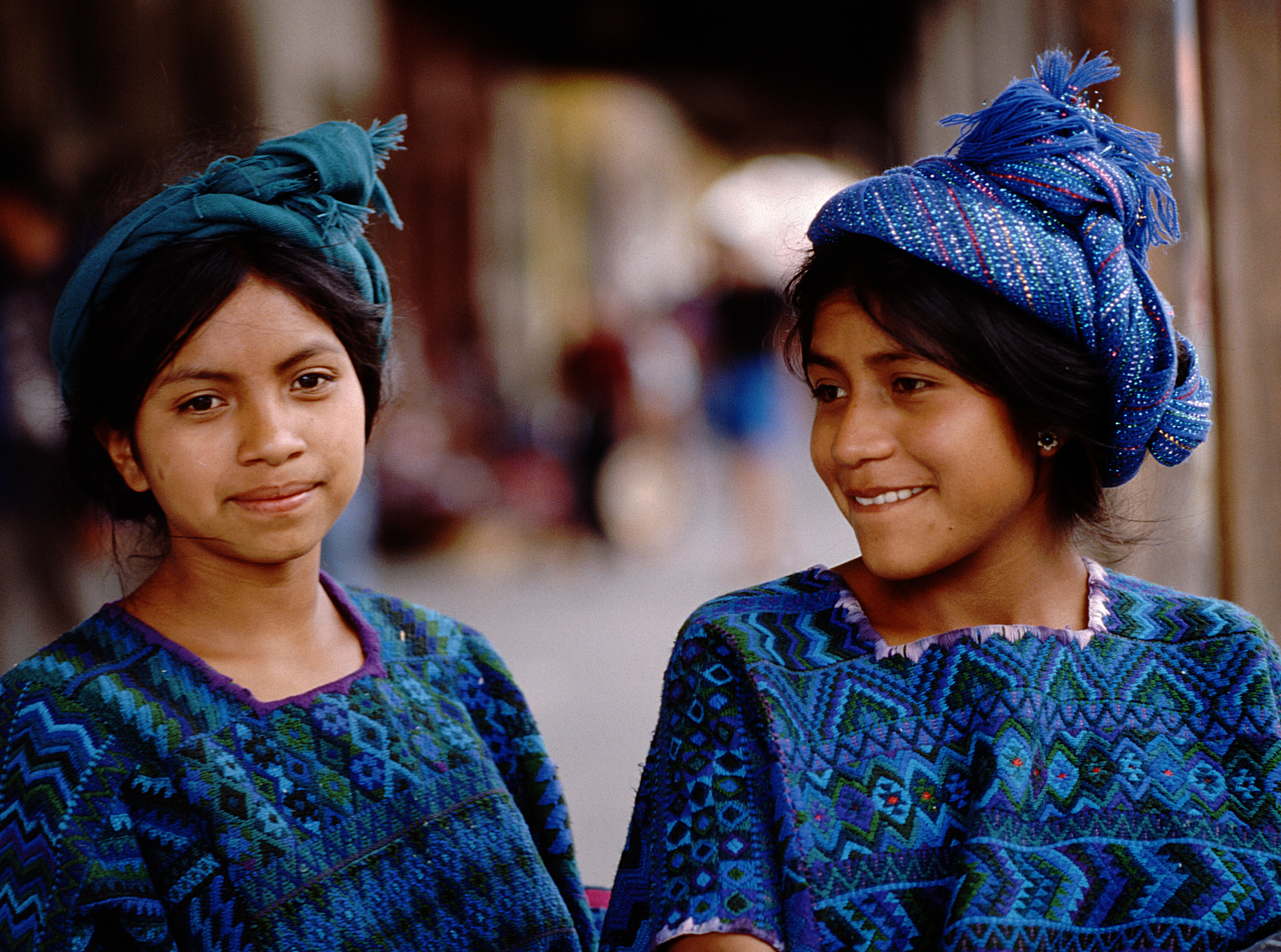
Guatemalan girls in their traditional clothing from the town of Santa Catarina Palopó on Lake Atitlán

The Maya people are known for their brightly colored yarn-based textiles, which are woven into capes, shirts, blouses, huipiles and dresses. Each village has its own distinctive pattern, making it possible to distinguish a person's home town on sight. Women's clothing consists of a shirt and a long skirt.

Roman Catholicism combined with the indigenous Maya religion is the unique syncretic religion which prevailed throughout the country and still does in the rural regions. Beginning from negligible roots prior to 1960, however, Protestant Pentecostalism has grown to become the predominant religion of Guatemala City and other urban centers and down to mid-sized towns. The unique religion is reflected in the local saint, Maximón, who is associated with the subterranean force of masculine fertility and prostitution. Always depicted in black, he wears a black hat and sits on a chair, often with a cigar placed in his mouth and a gun in his hand, with offerings of tobacco, alcohol and Coca-Cola at his feet. The locals know him as San Simon of Guatemala.

==== Nicaragua ====
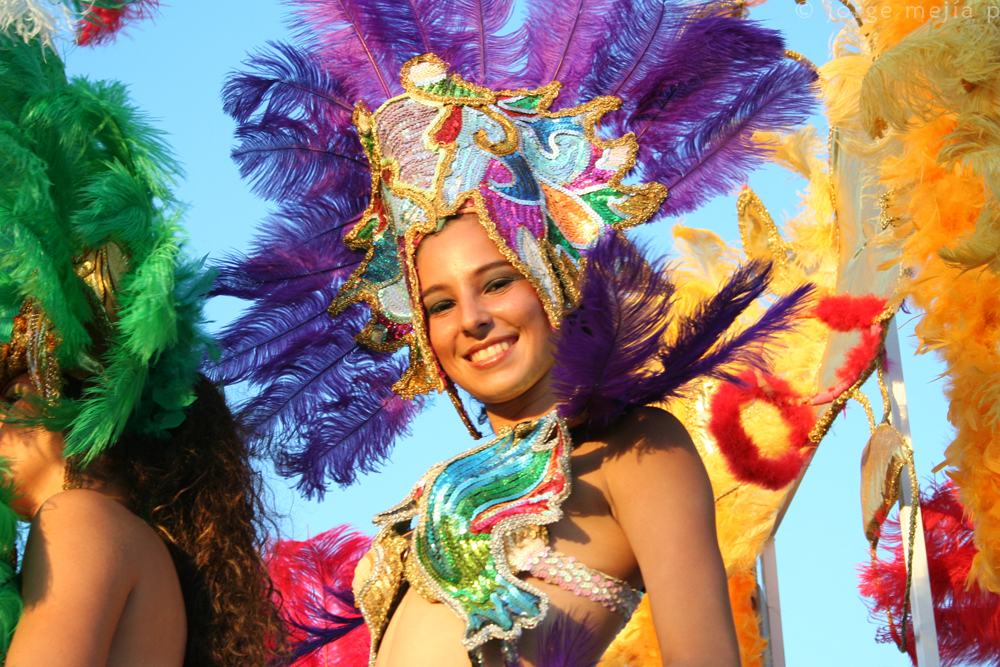
Celebrating the annual "Alegría por la vida" Carnaval in Managua, Nicaragua

Nicaraguan culture has several distinct strands. The Pacific coast has strong folklore, music and religious traditions, deeply influenced by European culture but enriched with Amerindian sounds/flavors. The Pacific coast of the country was colonized by Spain and has a similar culture to other Spanish-speaking Latin American countries. The Caribbean coast of the country, on the other hand, was once a British protectorate. English is still predominant in this region and spoken domestically along with Spanish and indigenous languages. Its culture is similar to that of Caribbean nations that were or are British possessions, such as Jamaica, Belize, Cayman Islands, etc.

Nicaraguan music is a mixture of indigenous and European, especially Spanish and to a lesser extent German, influences. The latter was a result of the German migration to the central-north regions of Las Segovias where Germans settled and brought with them polka music which influenced and evolved into Nicaraguan mazurka, polka and waltz. The Germans that migrated to Nicaragua are speculated to have been from the regions of Germany which were annexed to present-day Poland following the Second World War; hence the genres of mazurka, polka in addition to the waltz. One of the more famous composers of classical music and Nicaraguan waltz was José de la Cruz Mena who was actually not from the northern regions of Nicaragua but rather from the city of Leon in Nicaragua.

More nationally identified, however, are musical instruments such as the marimba which is also common across Central America. The marimba of Nicaragua is uniquely played by a sitting performer holding the instrument on his knees. It is usually accompanied by a bass fiddle, guitar and guitarrilla (a small guitar like a mandolin). This music is played at social functions as a sort of background music. The marimba is made with hardwood plates, placed over bamboo or metal tubes of varying lengths. It is played with two or four hammers. The Caribbean coast of Nicaragua is known for a lively, sensual form of dance music called Palo de Mayo. It is especially loud and celebrated during the Palo de Mayo festival in May The Garifuna community exists in Nicaragua and is known for its popular music called Punta.

Literature of Nicaragua can be traced to pre-Columbian times with the myths and oral literature that formed the cosmogonic view of the world that indigenous people had. Some of these stories are still known in Nicaragua. Like many Latin American countries, the Spanish conquerors and African slaves have had the most effect on both the culture and the literature. Nicaraguan literature is among the most important in Spanish language, with world-famous writers such as Rubén Darío who is regarded as the most important literary figure in Nicaragua, referred to as the "Father of Modernism" for leading the modernismo literary movement at the end of the 19th century.

El Güegüense is a satirical drama and was the first literary work of post-Columbian Nicaragua. It is regarded as one of Latin America's most distinctive colonial-era expressions and as Nicaragua's signature folkloric masterpiece combining music, dance and theater. The theatrical play was written by an anonymous author in the 16th century, making it one of the oldest indigenous theatrical/dance works of the Western Hemisphere. The story was published in a book in 1942 after many centuries.

=== South America ===
==== Andean states ====
The Andes Region comprises roughly much of what is now Venezuela, Colombia, Peru, Chile, Ecuador, and Bolivia, and was the seat of the Inca Empire in the pre-Columbian era. As such, many of the traditions date back to Incan traditions.

During the independization of the Americas many countries including Venezuela, Colombia, and Ecuador and Panama formed what was known as Gran Colombia, a federal republic that later dissolved, however, the people in these countries believe each other to be their brothers and sisters and as such share many traditions and festivals. Peru and Bolivia were also one single country until Bolivia declared its independence, nevertheless, both nations are close neighbors that have somewhat similar cultures.

Bolivia and Peru both still have significant Native American populations (primarily Quechua and Aymara) which mixed Spanish cultural elements with their ancestors' traditions. The Spanish-speaking population mainly follows the Western customs. Important archaeological ruins, gold and silver ornaments, stone monuments, ceramics, and weavings remain from several important pre-Columbian cultures. Major Bolivian ruins include Tiwanaku, Samaipata, Incallajta, and Iskanwaya.

The majority of the Ecuadorian population is mestizo, a mixture of both European and Amerindian ancestry, and much like their ancestry, the national culture is also a blend of these two sources, along with influences from slaves from Africa in the coastal region. 95% of Ecuadorians are Roman Catholic.

===== Peru =====
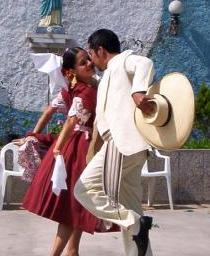
Marinera norteña, a Peruvian dance

Peruvian culture is primarily rooted in Amerindian and Spanish traditions, though it has also been influenced by various African, Asian, and a European ethnic group.

Peruvian artistic traditions date back to the elaborate pottery, textiles, jewelry, and sculpture of Pre-Inca cultures. The Incas maintained these crafts and made architectural achievements including the construction of Machu Picchu. Baroque art dominated in colonial times, though it was modified by native traditions. During this period, most art focused on religious subjects; the numerous churches of the era and the paintings of the Cuzco School are representative. Arts stagnated after independence until the emergence of Indigenismo in the early 20th century. Since the 1950s, Peruvian art has been eclectic and shaped by both foreign and local art currents.

Peruvian literature has its roots in the oral traditions of pre-Columbian civilizations. Spaniards introduced writing in the 16th century, and colonial literary expression included chronicles and religious literature. After independence, Costumbrism and Romanticism became the most common literary genres, as exemplified in the works of Ricardo Palma. In the early 20th century, the Indigenismo movement produced such writers as Ciro Alegría, José María Arguedas, and César Vallejo. During the second half of the century, Peruvian literature became more widely known because of authors such as Mario Vargas Llosa, a leading member of the Latin American Boom.

Peruvian cuisine is a blend of Amerindian and Spanish food with strong influences from African, Arab, Italian, Chinese, and Japanese cooking. Common dishes include anticuchos, ceviche, humitas, and pachamanca. Because of the variety of climates within Peru, a wide range of plants and animals are available for cooking. Peruvian cuisine has recently received acclaim due to its diversity of ingredients and techniques.

Peruvian music has Andean, Spanish and African roots. In pre-Columbian times, musical expressions varied widely from region to region; the quena and the tinya were two common instruments. Spanish conquest brought the introduction of new instruments such as the guitar and the harp, as well as the development of crossbred instruments like the charango. African contributions to Peruvian music include its rhythms and the cajón, a percussion instrument. Peruvian folk dances include the marinera, tondero and huayno.

===== Colombia =====
The culture of Colombia lies at the crossroads of Latin America. Thanks partly to geography, Colombian culture has been heavily fragmented into five major cultural regions. Rural to urban migration and globalization have changed how many Colombians live and express themselves as large cities become melting pots of people (many of whom are refugees) from the various provinces. According to a study in late 2004 by the Erasmus University in Rotterdam, Colombians are one of the happiest people in the world; this despite its four-decade long armed conflict involving the government, paramilitaries, drug lords, corruption and guerrillas like the FARC and ELN.

Many aspects of Colombian culture can be traced back to the culture of Spain of the 16th century and its collision with Colombia's native civilizations (see: Muisca, Tayrona). The Spanish brought Catholicism, African slaves, the feudal encomienda system, and a caste system that favored European-born whites. After independence from Spain, the criollos struggled to establish a pluralistic political system between conservative and liberal ideals.

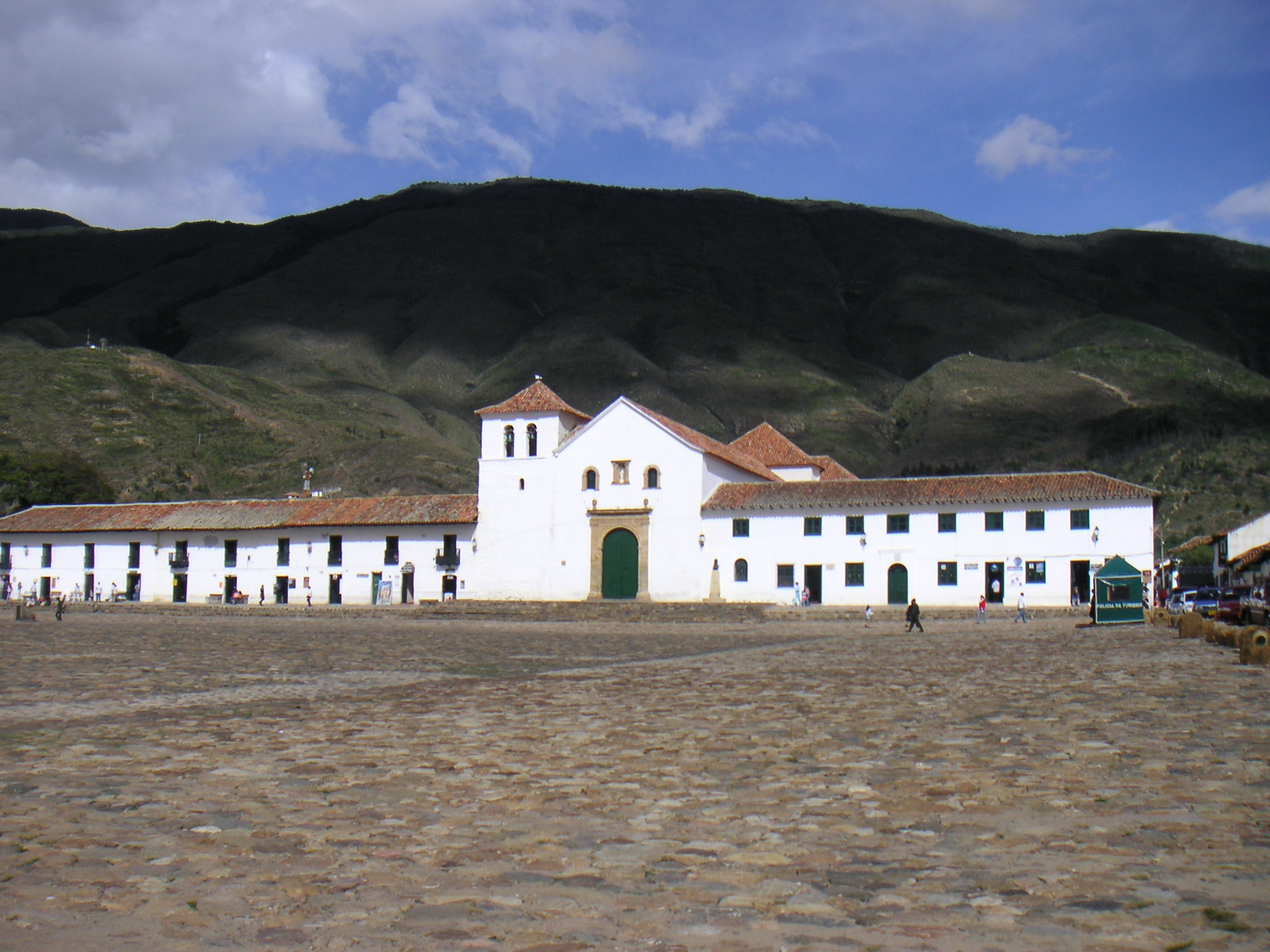
Villa de Leyva, a historical and cultural landmark of Colombia

Ethno-racial groups maintained their ancestral heritage culture: whites tried to keep themselves, despite the growing number of illegitimate children of mixed African or indigenous ancestry. These people were labeled with any number of descriptive names, derived from the casta system, such as mulato and moreno. Blacks and indigenous people of Colombia also mixed to form zambos creating a new ethno-racial group in society. This mix also created a fusion of cultures. Carnivals for example became an opportunity for all classes and colors to congregate without prejudice. The introduction of the bill of rights of men and the abolishment of slavery (1850) eased the segregationist tensions between the races, but the dominance of the whites prevailed and prevails to some extent to this day.

The industrial revolution arrived relatively late at the beginning of the 20th century with the establishment of the Republic of Colombia. Colombians had a period of almost 50 years of relative peace interrupted only by a short armed conflict with Peru over the town of Leticia in 1932.

Bogotá, the principal city, was the World Book Capital in 2007, in 2008 by the Iberoamerican Theatrum Festival Bogotá has been proclaimed as the world capital of theatre.

===== Venezuela =====
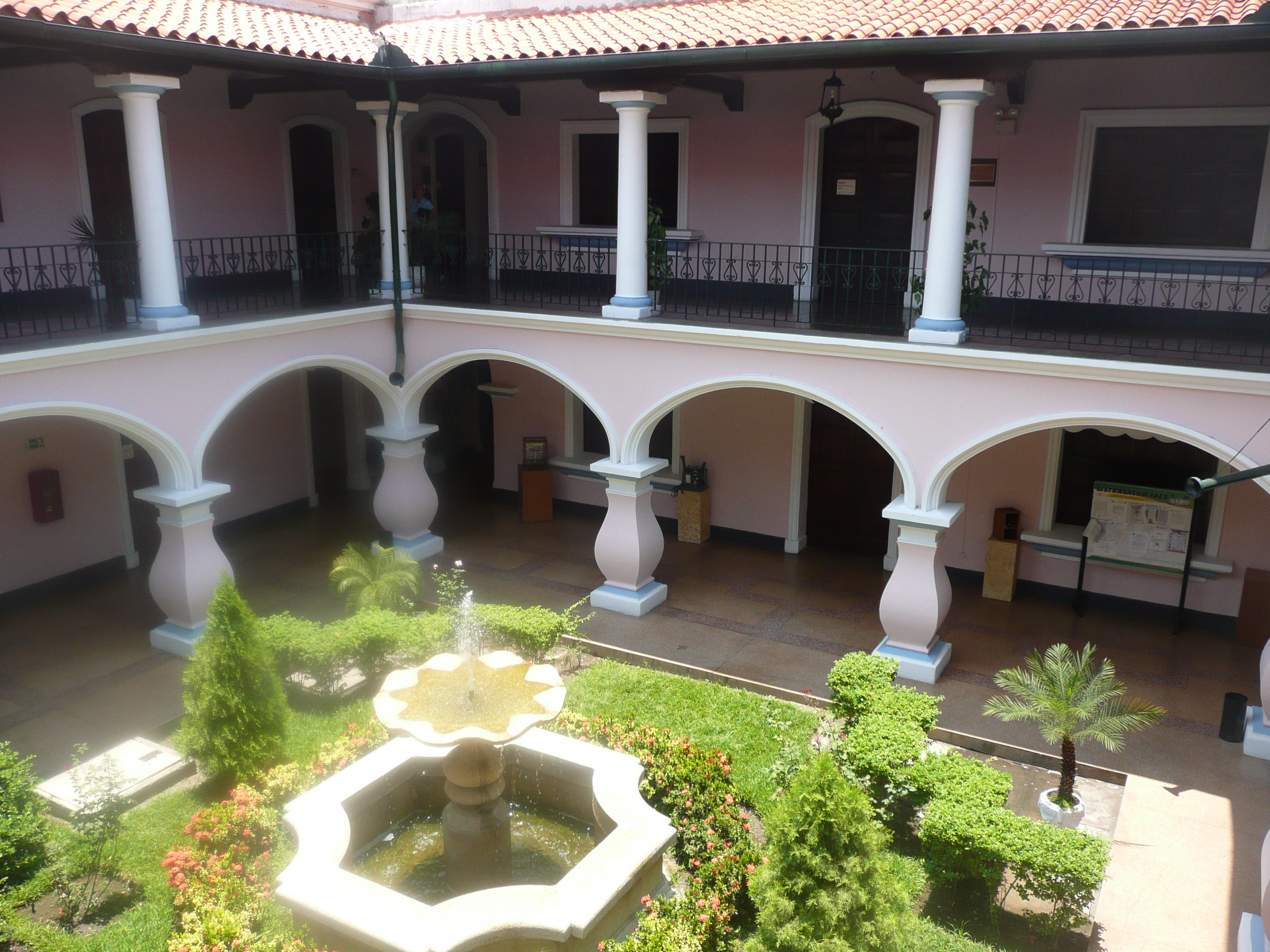
Instituto Arnoldo Gabaldón, declared August 30, 1984, as a National Historic Landmark

Venezuelan culture has been shaped by indigenous, African and especially European Spanish. Before this period, indigenous culture was expressed in art (petroglyphs), crafts, architecture (shabonos), and social organization. Aboriginal culture was subsequently assimilated by Spaniards; over the years, the hybrid culture had diversified by region.

At present the Indian influence is limited to a few words of vocabulary and gastronomy. The African influence in the same way, in addition to musical instruments like the drum. The Spanish influence was more important and in particular came from the regions of Andalusia and Extremadura, places of origin of most settlers in the Caribbean during the colonial era. As an example of this can include buildings, part of the music, the Catholic religion and language. Spanish influences are evident bullfights and certain features of the cuisine. Venezuela also enriched by other streams of Indian and European origin in the 19th century, especially France. In the last stage of the great cities and regions entered the U.S. oil source and demonstrations of the new immigration of Spanish, Italian and Portuguese, increasing the already complex cultural mosaic. For example: From the United States comes the influence of the taste of baseball and modern architectural structures

Venezuelan art is gaining prominence. Initially dominated by religious motifs, it began emphasizing historical and heroic representations in the late 19th century, a move led by Martín Tovar y Tovar. Modernism took over in the 20th century. Notable Venezuelan artists include Arturo Michelena, Cristóbal Rojas, Armando Reverón, Manuel Cabré, the kinetic artists Jesús-Rafael Soto and Carlos Cruz-Diez. Since the middle of the 20th century, artists such as Jacobo Borges, Régulo Perez, Pedro León Zapata, Harry Abend, Mario Abreu, Pancho Quilici, Carmelo Niño and Angel Peña emerged. They created a new plastic language. The 80s produced artist as Carlos Zerpa, Ernesto León, Miguel Von Dangel, Mateo Manaure, Patricia Van Dalen, Mercedes Elena Gonzalez, Zacarías García and Manuel Quintana Castillo. In more recent times, Venezuela produced a new diverse generation of innovating painters. Some of them are: Alejandro Bello, Edgard Álvarez Estrada, Gloria Fiallo, Felipe Herrera, Alberto Guacache and Morella Jurado.

Venezuelan literature originated soon after the Spanish conquest of the mostly pre-literate indigenous societies; it was dominated by Spanish influences. Following the rise of political literature during the War of Independence, Venezuelan Romanticism, notably expounded by Juan Vicente González, emerged as the first important genre in the region. Although mainly focused on narrative writing, Venezuelan literature was advanced by poets such as Andrés Eloy Blanco and Fermín Toro. Major writers and novelists include Rómulo Gallegos, Teresa de la Parra, Arturo Uslar Pietri, Adriano González León, Miguel Otero Silva, and Mariano Picón Salas. The great poet and humanist Andrés Bello was also an educator and intellectual. Others, such as Laureano Vallenilla Lanz and José Gil Fortoul, contributed to Venezuelan Positivism.

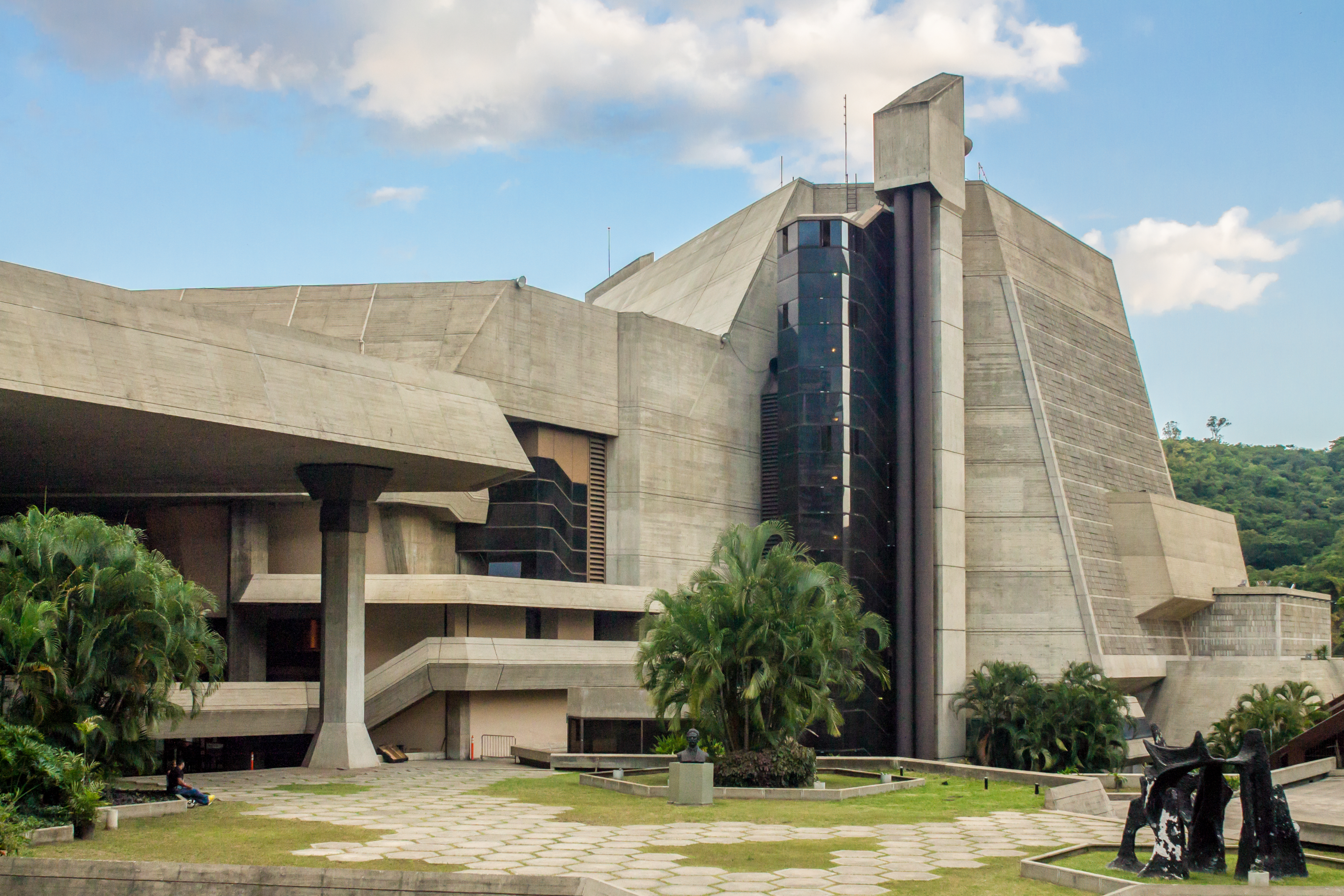
The Teresa Carreño Cultural Complex in Caracas

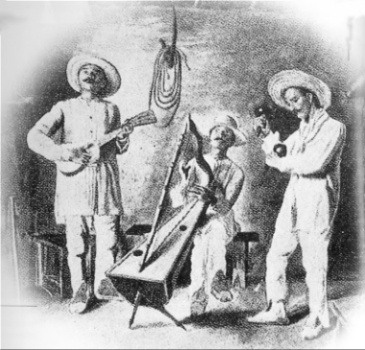
The joropo, as depicted in a 1912 drawing by Eloy Palacios

Carlos Raúl Villanueva was the most important Venezuelan architect of the modern era; he designed the Central University of Venezuela, (a World Heritage Site) and its Aula Magna. Other notable architectural works include the Capitol, the Baralt Theatre, the Teresa Carreño Cultural Complex, and the General Rafael Urdaneta Bridge.

Baseball and football are Venezuela's most popular sports, and the Venezuela national football team, is passionately followed. Famous Venezuelan baseball players include Luis Aparicio (inducted into the Baseball Hall of Fame), David (Dave) Concepción, Oswaldo (Ozzie) Guillén (current White Sox manager, World Series champion in 2005), Freddy Garcia, Andrés Galarraga, Omar Vizquel (an eleven-time Gold Glove winner), Luis Sojo, Miguel Cabrera, Bobby Abreu, Félix Hernández, Magglio Ordóñez, Ugueth Urbina, and Johan Santana (a two-time unanimously selected Cy Young Award winner).

==== Brazil ====
Theatre

In the 19th century, Brazilian theatre began with romanticism along with a fervour for political independence. During this time, racial issues were discussed in contradictory terms, but even so, there were some significant plays, including a series of popular comedies by Martins Penna, França Junior, and Arthur Azevedo.

In the 20th century, the two most important production centers for professional theatre were São Paulo and Rio de Janeiro. They were centers of industrial and economic development. Even with the development of these two theatres, World War I brought an end to tours by European theatres so there were no productions in Brazil during this time.

In November 1927, Alvaro Moreyra founded the Toy Theatre (Teatro de Brinquedo). Like this company, it was in the late 1920s when the first stable theatre companies formed around well-known actors. These actors were able to practice authentic Brazilian gestures gradually freed from Portuguese influence. Except for some political criticism in the low comedies, the dramas of this period were not popular. Occasionally the question of dependence on Europe or North America has raised. Even with more Latin American influence of theatre starting to filter in, its theatre still was under the heavy influence of Europe.

The Brazilian Comedy Theatre (Teatro Brasileiro de Comédia) was created in 1948

Oswald de Andrade wrote three plays; The King of the Candle (O Rei da Vela, 1933), The Man and the Horse (O Homem e o Cavalo, 1934). and The Dead Woman (A Morta, 1937). They were an attempt to deal with political themes, nationalism, and anti-imperialism. His theatre was inspired by Meyerhold's and Brecht's theories, with a political sarcasm like Mayakovsky.

1943 at The Comedians: Polish director and refugee from the Nazis, Zbigniew Ziembinsky, staged in expressionist style Nelson Rodrigues' A Bride's Gown (Vestido de Noiva). With this production, Brazilian theatre moved into the modern period at Theatre Brasileiro de Commedia (Brazilian Comedy Theater).

World War II saw Brazil gain several foreign directors, especially from Italy, who wanted to make a theatre free from nationalistic overtones. Paradoxically, this led to a second renewal that engaged popular forms and sentiments; a renewal that was decidedly nationalistic with social point of view.

During this time, the Stanislavsky system of acting was most popular and widely used. The Stanislavski method was introduced to Brazil by Eugenio Kusnet, a Russian actor who moved to the country in 1926.

The next phase was from 1958 to the signing of the Institutional Act Number Five in 1968. It marked the end of freedom and democracy. These ten years were the most productive of the century. During these years dramaturgy matured through the plays of Guarnieri, Vianinha, Boal, Dias Gomes, and Chico de Assis, as did mise-en-scene in the work of Boal, Jost Celso Martinez Correa, Flavio Rangel, and Antunes Filho. During this decade a generation accepted theatre as an activity with social responsibility.

At its height, this phase of Brazilian theatre was characterized by an affirmation of national values. Actors and directors became political activists who risked their jobs and lives daily.

Through this growth of Latin America politically and the influence of European theatre, an identity of what is theatre in Latin America stemmed out of it.

Modern painting

Modern painting in Brazil was born during Modern Art Week in 1922. Artists who have excelled in 20th century Brazilian art include Tarsila do Amaral, Emiliano Di Cavalcanti, and Candido Portinari. Portinari was influenced by Cubism and Expressionism and is the painter of War and Peace, a panel at the United Nations in New York.

Photography

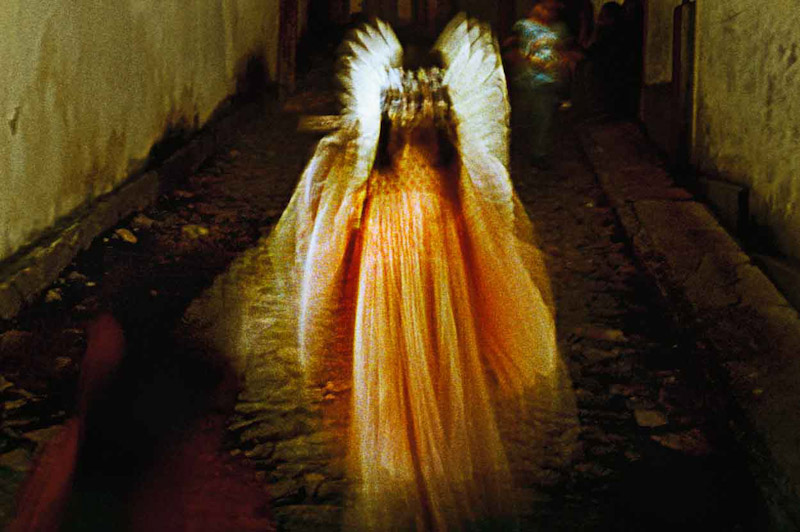
Holy week, Ouro Preto-MG, 2010. Chrome. Photo: Guy Veloso.

Brazilian contemporary photography is one of the most creative in Latin America, growing in international prominence each year with exhibitions and publications. Photographers like Miguel Rio Branco, Vik Muniz, Sebastião Salgado, and Guy Veloso have received recognition.

== See also ==
- Culture and society in the Spanish Colonial Americas
- Culture of South America
- Hispanic culture
- Arts by region
- Sumak Kawsay
- Amerindians

== Bibliography ==
- Alonso, Paul. Satiric TV in the Americas: Critical Metatainment as Negotiated Dissent. Oxford University Press, 2018.
- Jr., Robert Eli Sanchez (August 26, 2019). Sanchez, Robert Eli (ed.). Latin American and Latinx Philosophy. New York London: Routledge, Taylor & Francis Group. doi:10.4324/9781315100401. ISBN 9781138295865. OCLC 1112422733.
- Bailey, Gauvin Alexander. Art of colonial Latin America. London: Phaidon, 2005.
- Bayón, Damián. "Art, c. 1920–c. 1980". In: Leslie Bethell (ed.), A cultural history of Latin America. Cambridge: University of Cambridge, 1998, pp. 393–454.
- (in Spanish) Belaunde, Víctor Andrés. Peruanidad. Lima: BCR, 1983.
- Concha, Jaime. "Poetry, c. 1920–1950". In: Leslie Bethell (ed.), A cultural history of Latin America. Cambridge: University of Cambridge, 1998, pp. 227–260.
- Custer, Tony. The Art of Peruvian Cuisine. Lima: Ediciones Ganesha, 2003.
- Lucie-Smith, Edward. Latin American art of the 20th century. London: Thames and Hudson, 1993.
- Martin, Gerald. "Literature, music and the visual arts, c. 1820–1870". In: Leslie Bethell (ed.), A cultural history of Latin America. Cambridge: University of Cambridge, 1998, pp. 3–45.
- Martin, Gerald. "Narrative since c. 1920". In: Leslie Bethell (ed.), A cultural history of Latin America. Cambridge: University of Cambridge, 1998, pp. 133–225.
- Olsen, Dale. Music of El Dorado: the ethnomusicology of ancient South American cultures. Gainesville: University Press of Florida, 2002.
- (in Spanish) Romero, Raúl. "La música tradicional y popular". In: Patronato Popular y Porvenir, La música en el Perú. Lima: Industrial Gráfica, 1985, pp. 215–283.
- Romero, Raúl. "Andean Peru". In: John Schechter (ed.), Music in Latin American culture: regional tradition. New York: Schirmer Books, 1999, pp. 383–423.
- Turino, Thomas. "Charango". In: Stanley Sadie (ed.), The New Grove Dictionary of Musical Instruments. New York: MacMillan Press Limited, 1993, vol. I, p. 340.
