= Vive =

Vive may refer to:

- Vive, viva, and vivat, a Romance language expression
- ViVe, a state-owned Venezuelan television channel

== Computing ==
- HTC Vive, virtual reality head-mounted display
- Vive (software), members-only mobile video chat community

== Music ==
- Vive (José José album), 1974
- Vive (Lucía Méndez album), 2004
- Vive (a cappella group), a group from England, United Kingdom
- "Vive", the Spanish-language version of "Spirit" (Beyoncé song)
