= Enamorada =

Enamorada may refer to:

== Film and TV ==
- Enamorada (film), a 1946 Mexican drama film
- Enamorada (1986 TV series), a 1986 Venezuelan telenovela
- Enamorada (1999 TV series), a 1999 Venezuelan telenovela

== Music ==
- Enamorada (Lucía Méndez album), 1983
- Enamorada (Yuri album), 2002
- Enamorada, a 1998 album by María Félix
- Enamorada, a 1996 album by Zayda y Su Grupo
- "Enamorada" (I'm So In Love), a song by Paulina Rubio from Planeta Paulina
- "Enamorada", a standard song written by Consuelo Velázquez
