= Luna morena =

Luna Morena

Studio album by Lucía Méndez
- Released: October 24, 1989
- Recorded: 1989
- Genre: Pop
- Label: Ariola

Lucía Méndez chronology
| Mis Íntimas Razones (1988) | Luna Morena (1989) | Amor de Nadie (Single) (1990) |

Lucia es Luna Morena is the 13th album by Mexican iconic pop singer Lucía Méndez, It was released in 1989 then the song Amor de Nadie was added to the album and it was re-released on February 28, 1991.

== Track listing (1989) ==
1. Nos Aburriremos Juntos
2. Tormenta de Verano
3. Devuélveme el Amor
4. Juntos por Costumbre
5. Nube Viajera
6. No Hay Hombres
7. ¿Quién Será?
8. Secreto (Straniero)
9. Luna Morena (Creo en el Amor)
10. Poquito de Sabor

== Track listing (1991) ==
1. Nos Aburriremos Juntos
2. Tormenta de Verano
3. Devuélveme el Amor
4. Juntos por Costumbre
5. Nube Viajera
6. Amor de Nadie
7. No Hay Hombres
8. ¿Quién Será?
9. Secreto (Straniero)
10. Luna Morena (Creo en el Amor)
11. Poquito de Sabor
- Cielo Rojo (Juan Zaizar) is a song recorded for the album México: Voz y Sentimiento which was released in 1990 but not included on the re-release of Luna Morena the next year.

== Singles ==
- Amor de Nadie / Amor de Nadie (Instrumental) (Piano: Luís Reynoso Góngora)
- Tormenta de Verano / Luna Morena (Creo en el Amor)
- Juntos por Costumbre / No Hay Hombres
- Nos Aburriremos Juntos / ¿Quién Será?

== Video Clips ==
- Un Poquito de Sabor
- Tormenta de Verano (Official Video Clip)
- Amor de Nadie (Official Video Clip)
- Devuélveme el Amor
- Secreto
- Juntos por Costumbre (Versión 2) (Official Video Clip)
- Luna Morena (Official Video Clip)
- Juntos por Costumbre (Versión 1)
- Nube Viajera
- No Hay Hombres
- ¿Quién Será?
- Nos Aburriremos Juntos (Official Video Clip)
