= Eduardo Mendieta =

Colombian and American philosopher (1963–2025)

Eduardo Mendieta (28 December 1963 – 17 December 2025) was a Colombian and American philosopher and academic. He was Professor of Philosophy at Penn State University, and acting director of the Rock Ethics Institute. Mendieta's research focused on ethics, political philosophy, Latinx philosophy, Latin American philosophy, critical theory (especially the Frankfurt School), philosophy of race, and feminist philosophy.

== Background ==
Mendieta was born in Bogotá, Colombia, on 28 December 1963. He earned his BA in philosophy at Rutgers University, his MA in systematic theology at Union Theological Seminary, and his PhD in philosophy at the New School for Social Research. He was assistant professor of philosophy at the University of San Francisco from 1995 to 2001 before moving to Stony Brook University, where he served as director of the Latin American and Caribbean Studies Center from 2005 to 2008 and chair of the Department of Philosophy from 2012 to 2015. He also held visiting positions at the Universidad Iberoamericana and the European Humanities University.

He was executive editor of Radical Philosophy Review from 2003 to 2007, and a founding editor of the American Philosophical Association's Newsletter of Hispanics in Philosophy.

Mendieta was a member of the editorial advisory board for Public Philosophy Journal.

Mendieta died on 17 December 2025 at the age of 61.

== Research ==
Mendieta investigated topics including animal rights, colonialism, globalization, mass incarceration, and torture, often by building on the conceptual resources of Frankfurt School-style critical theory. His publications included The Adventures of Transcendental Philosophy: Karl-Otto Apel's Semiotics and Discourse Ethics (2002), Global Fragments: Globalizations, Latinamericanisms, and Critical Theory (2007), and The Philosophical Animal: On Zoopoetics and Interspecies Cosmopolitanism (2024). Global Fragments has been described as an "important" contribution to ways of thinking about globalization that are "too often ignored in Western European and North American philosophy". Abolition Democracy: Beyond Empire, Torture and War (2006) is a series of interviews between Mendieta and Angela Davis on mass incarceration and torture, which was praised as "a much needed political intervention in mainstream discourse about the Abu Ghraib case". He also translated the work of Enrique Dussel and Karl-Otto Apel, and co-edited The Power of Religion in the Public Sphere (2011), Reading Kant's Geography (2011), and Habermas and Religion (2013).

He was interviewed about the challenges and opportunities facing Latinos in contemporary academic philosophy.

== Awards and honors ==
Mendieta's awards and honors included:

2013 SUNY Chancellor's Award for Excellence in Teaching

2013 Faculty of Arts, Humanities, and Social Sciences Steering Committee (FAHSS) award for research project: “Capital of the Cold War: La Havana After the Collapse of the Soviet Union”

2012 Faculty of Arts, Humanities, and Social Science Steering Committee (FAHSS) award for interdisciplinary initiative submitted with Paul Firbas and Victoriano Roncero-López : “The Latino/a Intellectual: A symposium”

2012 Institute for the History of Philosophy, Summer Workshop: “Peirce, James, and the Origins of Pragmatism” Emory University, Atlanta, 4–14 June 2012.

2011 Faculty of Arts, Humanities, and Social Science Steering Committee (FAHSS) award for research project: “The City of Black Gold: Caracas and The Geopolitics of Oil”

2011 Dean's Award for Excellence in Graduate Teaching

2010 Honorary member of the Golden Key International Association

2009 Institute of Advanced Study, Fellow, Durham University, England (January–March 2009)

2009 Hispanic Heritage Month Latino Faculty Recognition Award

2007 Hispanic Heritage Month Organizing Committee Faculty Award

2006 Certificate of Special Commendation for Graduate Mentoring by a Faculty Member
