= El Príncipe (José José album) =

Studio album by José José
- Released: 1976 (México)
- Recorded: México
- Genre: Latin pop, soul
- Label: RCA
- Producer: Eduardo Magallanes

José José chronology
Tan Cerca...Tan Lejos (1975)	El Príncipe (1976)	Reencuentro (1977)

El Príncipe (The Prince) is the title of the studio album released by Mexican singer José José in 1976 and the last one he recorded for RCA. The album is highlighted by a trendy sound, with more tendencies towards jazz, soul, funk, pop music and several fusions.

In this album, José José sings themes of Paul Anka, Wildo, Manolo Marroqui, and one of the inspiration of the Mexican comedian Sergio Corona.

The main hits of the album were: Nuestro Amor Es Lo Más Bello Del Mundo, En Las Puertas Del Colegio, Tu Melodía and the song that gives name to the album, El Príncipe (The Prince).

Because of the album and the song El Principe, José José acquired the nickname that forever would identify him with the audience: "The Prince of the Song".

== Track listing ==
1. "En Las Puertas Del Colegio" (Blas Eduardo-Wildo) – 3:11
2. "Remate (Rubén Fuentes-Renato" Leduc) – 2:55
3. "Mil Gracias Por Tu Amor" (Blas Eduardo-Wildo) – 3:13
4. "Otro Día Sin Ti" (Carlos Pineda) – 2:39
5. "Verte A Ti" (José María Castilla) – 3:20
6. "Nuestro Amor Es Lo Más Bello Del Mundo" ("I Believe [There's Nothing Stronger Than Our Love]") (Paul Anka) – 3:22
7. "Tu Melodía" (David Peñaflor) – 4:13
8. "El Príncipe" (Manolo Marroqui) – 3:14
9. "San Blas" (América De La Paz) – 3:18
10. "Mirame" (Sergio Corona) – 3:06

== Musical arrangement and direction ==
- 1,5,6,8 Homero Patrón
- 2,3 Eduardo Magallanes
- 4,10 Mario Patrón
- 7 Enrique Neri
- 9 Nacho Rosales

== Reception ==
- Allmusic
