= La maestra Méndez =

- Genre: Telenovela
- Directed by: Luis Vega
- Starring: Lucía Méndez
- Country of origin: Mexico
- Original language: Spanish

Original release
- Network: Canal de las Estrellas
- Release: 1971

La maestra Méndez is a Mexican TV series produced by Televisa for Canal de las Estrellas in 1971.

== Cast ==
- Lucía Méndez as La maestra Méndez
- Víctor Junco
- Félix González
