= Tan Cerca...Tan Lejos =

Studio album by José José
- Released: 1975 (México)
- Recorded: Mexico
- Genre: Latin pop
- Label: RCA

José José chronology
Vive (1974)	Tan Cerca...Tan Lejos (1975)	El Príncipe (1976)

Tan Cerca...Tan Lejos (So close ... so far) is the title of the studio album released by Mexican singer José José in 1975. The main hits of the album were: Candilejas (Charles Chaplin's Terry's Theme), Sentimientos (Morris Albert's Feelings), Nuestros Recuerdos (The Way We Were), Paloma 'Cada Mañana Que Te Vas' (theme of the soap opera 'Paloma') and Divina ilusión (an adaptation of Étude Op. 10, No. 3 of Chopin).

== Track listing ==
1. Divina Ilusión (adaptation of Étude Op. 10, No. 3 of Chopin)
2. Sentimientos (Feelings)
3. Nuestros Recuerdos (The Way We Were)
4. Tan Cerca...Tan Lejos
5. Hoy Vuelvo A Ser...El Triste
6. Paloma 'Cada Mañana Que Te Vas'
7. Candilejas (The Terry Theme)
8. Porque Yo No Soy Poeta
9. Tú Y Yo
10. Alas
