= Mis íntimas razones =

Studio album by Lucía Méndez
- Released: March 24, 1988
- Recorded: 1987–1988
- Genre: Pop
- Label: Ariola

Lucía Méndez chronology
Castígame (1986)	Mis íntimas razones (1988)	Luna Morena (1989)

Mis Íntimas Razones (My Intimate Reasons) is the 12th album by Mexican iconic pop singer Lucía Méndez, It was released in 1988 as she was filming the telenovela El Extraño Retorno de Diana Salazar.

== Track listing ==
1. Un Alma en Pena
2. Te Me Vuelves Soledad
3. Aventurero
4. Llegaré
5. Mis Íntimas Razones
6. Rueda el Amor
7. Cuatro Semanas
8. Rota de Amor
9. Mal Enamorada
10. Morir un Poco
11. Mala Jugada

== Singles ==
- Aventurero
- Un Alma en Pena
- Morir un Poco

== Video Clips ==
- Aventurero
- Un Alma en Pena
