= Sólo Una Mujer =

Solo una Mujer

Studio album by Lucía Méndez
- Released: 1984
- Recorded: 1984
- Genre: Pop
- Label: Ariola
- Producer: Honorio Herrero

Lucía Méndez chronology
Enamorada (1983)	Solo una Mujer (1984)	Te Quiero (1985)

Sólo una Mujer ("Just a Woman") is the 9th album by Mexican singer Lucía Méndez. It was released in 1984 as she was filming the telenovela Tú o Nadie. This album received a nomination for a Grammy Award for Best Latin Pop Album.

== Track listing ==
1. "Sólo una Mujer"
2. "La Luna de Cancún"
3. "Ella es una Señora"
4. "El Amor sin Ti no Vale Nada"
5. "Padre Nuestro"
6. "Romántica"
7. "Puede Ser, Puede Ser"
8. "Don corazón"
9. "Corazón de Piedra"
10. "Soy Bellísima"

== Singles ==
- Corazón de Piedra / Don corazón
- Sólo una Mujer / La Luna de Cancún

== Video Clips ==
- Don corazón
- Corazón de Piedra
- La Luna de Cancún
- Sólo una Mujer
