= Vive (José José album) =

Studio album by José José
- Released: 1974 (México)
- Recorded: Mexico
- Genre: Latin pop
- Label: RCA

José José chronology
Hasta Que Vuelvas (1973)	Vive (1974)	Tan Cerca...Tan Lejos (1975)

Vive (Live) is the title of the studio album released by Mexican singer José José in 1974. The main hits of the album were: Vive, Déjame Conocerte (Paul Anka's "Let Me Get To Know You") and Tú Mi Delirio.

== Track listing ==
1. Cada Mañana
2. Y Nada Más
3. Es Que Te Quiero
4. Tú Eres Todo Para Mí (You Are The Sunshine Of My Life)
5. Alguien Que Te Extraña
6. Estábamos Juntos
7. Vive
8. Déjame Conocerte (Paul Anka's "Let Me Get To Know You")
9. Tú Mi Delirio
10. Y Háblame
11. Cuando El Amor Se Va De Casa (Cuando O Amor Cambia De Casa)
