= Vive (Lucía Méndez album) =

Studio album by Lucía Méndez
- Released: August 3, 2004
- Recorded: 2004
- Genre: Pop
- Label: Universal Music Mexico

Lucía Méndez chronology
Dulce Romance (1999)	Vive (2004)	Otra Vez Enamorada con un Nuevo Amanecer (2009)

Vive ("Live") is a studio album by Mexican pop singer Lucía Méndez. It was released in 2004 by Universal Music Mexico. "La pareja dispareja" and "Almas Gemelas" feature Mexican band Los Tucanes de Tijuana.

== Track listing ==
1. Aunque Me Duela El Alma
2. El Cubano está Loco
3. La Pareja Dispareja (Lucía Méndez / Los Tucanes de Tijuana)
4. Que Te Ruegue Tu Madre
5. Si Quieres (Juan Gabriel)
6. Vive
7. Así Soy Yo
8. Atrápame
9. Almas Gemelas (Lucía Méndez / Los Tucanes de Tijuana)
10. Corazón de Piedra (2004 Dance Version)

== Singles ==
- Aunque Me Duela El Alma / El Cubano está Loco
- La Pareja Dispareja (Lucía Méndez / Los Tucanes de Tijuana)

== Video Clips ==
- La Pareja Dispareja (Lucía Méndez / Los Tucanes de Tijuana)
