= Guy Veloso =

Brazilian documentary photographer (born 1969)

Guy Veloso (born 1969) is a Brazilian documentary photographer.

== Biography ==
Guy Benchimol de Veloso was born and works in Belém in the State of Pará, Brazil, a city of 1.5 million inhabitants in the Amazon rainforest. A Law graduate by Federal University of Pará, he has been a photographer since 1989, with several international publications to his credit. All his projects are made with analog equipment. Invited by the curators Agnaldo Farias and Moacir dos Anjos, the latest project of Guy Veloso, The Penitents: Rituals of blood to the fascination of the world’s end, attended the 29th São Paulo Art Biennial(2010).

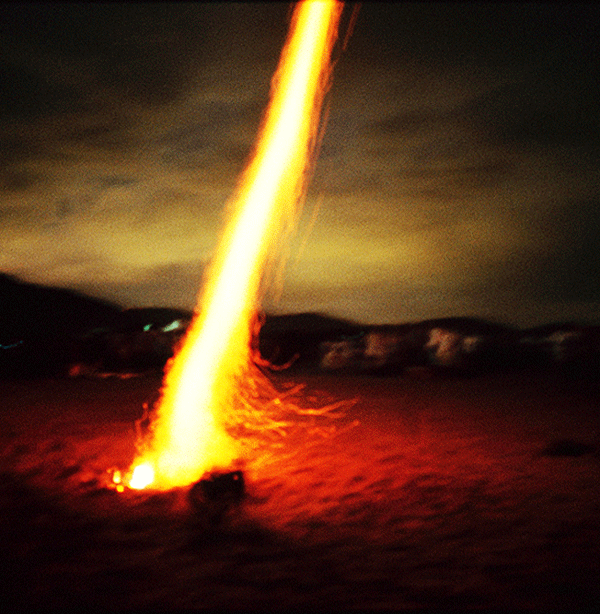
Florianópolis, Santa Catarina, Brazil. 29th São Paulo International Biennial/2010. Slide.

== Career ==
His work is part of the Essex Collection of Art from Latin America (ESCALA), Colchester (England), Portuguese Center of Photography in Porto (Portugal), MASP - São Paulo Museum of Art (Brazil), Museum Modern Art in Rio de Janeiro and Museum of Modern Art in São Paulo (Brazil).

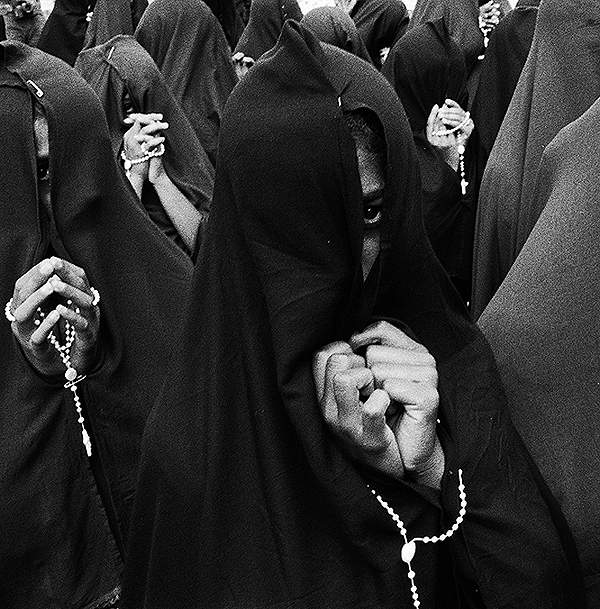
Penitents, Sergipe-Brazil, 2002. Gelatin silver print.

In 2005 started his career as curator. In the same year he launched the book Photography in Brazil: A Look from the Origins to the Contemporary by Angela Magalhães e Nadja Peregrino. In 2007 he exhibited individually at the company where the lenses and machines he uses are made, Leica, in Solms - Germany. In 2011 he was Chief-curator of the Brazilian Contemporary Photography Section in the XXIII Bienal Europalia Arts Festival in Brussels - Belgium. In 2012 took part of the book "150 Years of Photography in Brazil" by Boris Kossoy and Lilia Schwarcz.
