= Tony Custer =

Peruvian businessman and philanthropist

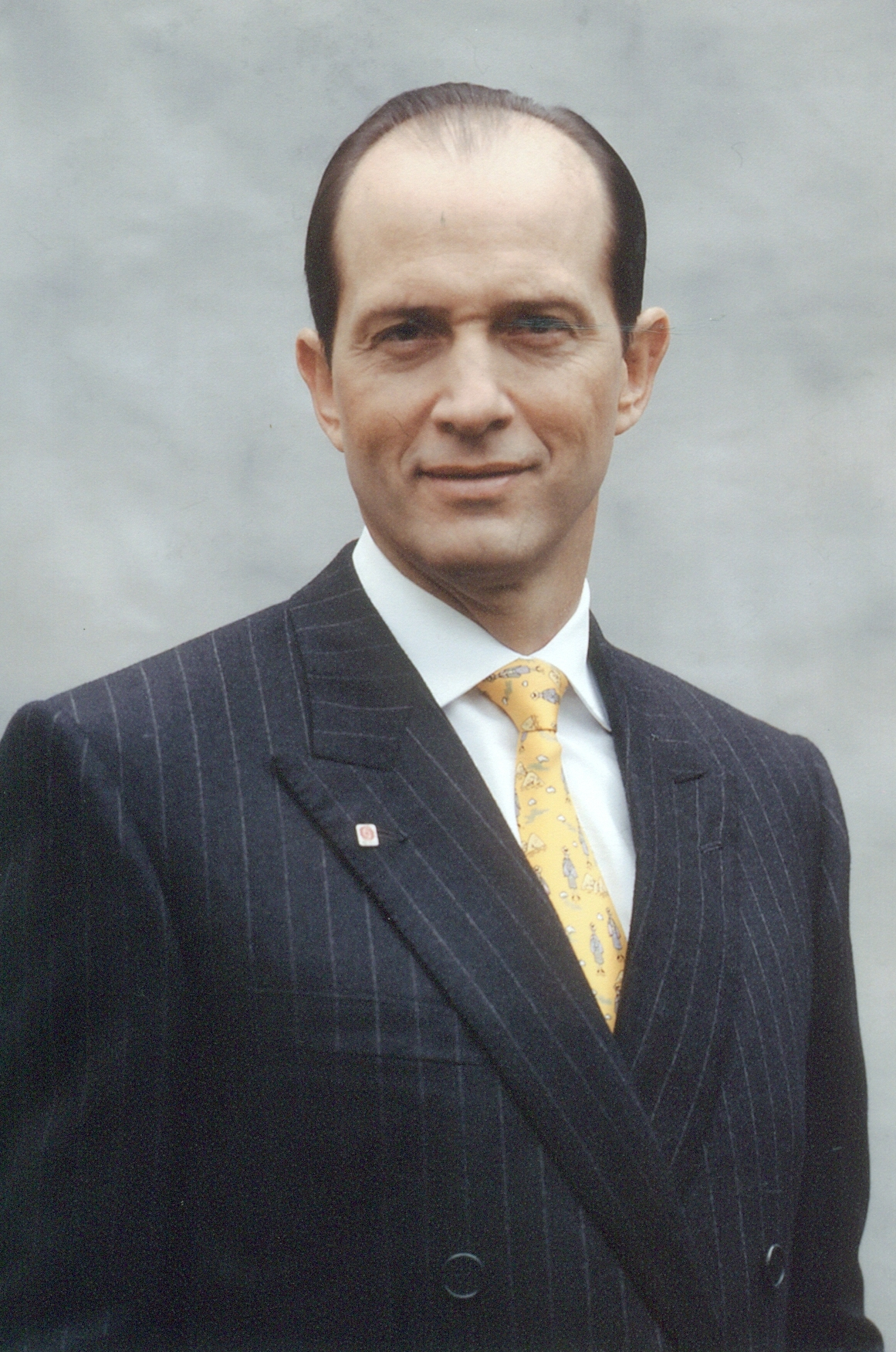
Tony Custer

Felipe Antonio "Tony" Custer Hallett (born May 27, 1954, Lima, Peru) is a Peruvian businessman and philanthropist. He is the son and grandson, respectively, of Jacques R. Custer and Richard O. Custer, noted Swiss-Peruvian entrepreneurs. He was educated in Peru, the US and Europe, and currently heads the Corporación Custer as principal shareholder, as well as being President of The Fundación Custer in Lima, Peru.

Custer is also Chair Emeritus of the Advisory Board of the David Rockefeller Center for Latin American Studies at Harvard University, a director of the Orchestra of the Americas in Washington DC., President of the Swiss Chamber of Commerce in Lima, Peru, President of the International Advisory Board of Centrum PUCP (Business School) in Lima, Peru, member of the Latin America Advisory Board at Harvard Business School, Honorary President and Founder of the Oasis Bahía de Paracas Club, as well as numerous other institutions.

== Career ==
The Custer Group of companies is in its 100th year in Peru, having expanded to eleven countries: Peru, Ecuador, Colombia, Bolivia, Costa Rica, Guatemala, Nicaragua, Honduras, El Salvador, Dominican Republic and Panama. The Company currently has two main divisions: Agrochemicals and specialty chemicals under the brand Interoc and Real Estate. The Corporation employs over 700 people in these eleven countries with sales of $160 millions.

== Philanthropy ==
Custer founded The Fundación Custer in 1996 and in 1998 The Foundation began to develop the “Aprendamos Juntos” program which came to have 13 centers in schools in the lowest income areas of Lima. During the 21 years of the “Aprendamos Juntos” program, 40 therapists provided critical educational assistance in annual courses to over 18,500 students of first and second grade that attended the program, which equips at-risk children with basic learning skills, helping them progress through their schooling where they otherwise often repeat years and/or drop out. Aprendamos Juntos also developed programs for parents and teachers. Through this program, over 13,255 parents learned how to help their children overcome the challenges they face, and over 2600 teachers acquired these skills. Finally, Aprendamos Juntos developed a special pre-school program for those schools that have kindergarten. Along with this, The Foundation assured the presence of the young Peruvian musicians selected every year to participate in the Orchestra of the Americas programs.

Custer is President Emeritus of the Patronato Cultural del Perú, as well as belonging to the “Group of 50” in Washington DC., as well as numerous museums and other NGO boards in Peru and abroad. Tony Custer is the author of “The Art of Peruvian Cuisine” volumes I & II, with 110,000 copies is Peru’s bestseller cookbook. The entire proceeds of which are dedicated to sustaining and developing The Aprendamos Juntos Program. The same is true for his series of four children’s books featuring the moralizing adventures of a young bearcub “Las aventuras del Osezno Febezno”. Mr. Custer received an honors degree on Economics from Harvard College in 1976 and an MBA from the Harvard Business School in 1979. He is fluent in Spanish, English and French and has knowledge of Italian. He is married to Ana María Guiulfo, one of Peru’s top fashion designers and has five children and ten grandchildren.

His hobbies are: the gastronomy, sailing, skiing and the design and construction of “picnic boats”. Mr. Custer is also composer, arranger and singer of three music albums that can be found in Spotify and Youtube under the names: “Canciones sencillas de amor”, “Pandemic Suite” and “Random Thoughts and Melodies”.
