= Mercedes Elena Gonzalez =

Artist (b. 1952)

Mercedes Elena González is an artist from Caracas, Venezuela. She has worked on various multimedia art pieces that incorporate lines, shapes, and colors to showcase modern abstraction.

== Early life and career ==
Mercedes Elena González was born in Caracas, Venezuela, in 1952. In the years 1974 to 1976, she attended a school in her hometown known as Taller Teresa Azara. Following her attendance there, González continued her studies at the School of the Museum of Fine Arts in Boston, Massachusetts until 1980.

== Selected works ==
=== September 1955 Series (2013) ===
In her series, September 1955, González portrays art that was inspired by a Venezuelan magazine called Integral. The name itself is derived from the specific month and year that Integral showcased modern abstraction as a new form of art. González uses her drawing as means to explore the hopefulness that modern abstraction brought to youth during the 1950s, along with the political obstacles that have slowly ruined the countries well-being. She comes from a generation in which modernism was not popular in Latin America. Her series reflects on her personal realization of what Venezuela has come to be, through the use of abstract art.

=== Vulvosa tríptico (Vulviform triptych) (1979–81) ===
This series of art explores the biological process of reproduction. It was created on a graphite board with acrylic paint. Her father was a doctor and, for that reason, a lot of her art reflects anatomical features. This specific series was controversial at the time because of how uncommon it was to see vaginal imagery in Venezuela. The use of soft lines and colors gave viewers a calm feeling about the subject. Her art was inspired by Georgia O'Keeffe, an artist who also sparked controversy.
