= Enamorada (Lucía Méndez album) =

Studio album by Lucía Méndez
- Released: 1983
- Recorded: 1983
- Genre: Pop
- Label: Ariola

Lucía Méndez chronology
Cerca de Ti (1982)	Enamorada (1983)	Solo una Mujer (1984)

Enamorada (In love) is the eighth album by Mexican iconic pop singer Lucía Méndez. The album was released in 1983 and helped her to consolidate herself in Latin America with themes such as Enamorada, Amor Volcánico, Mi Amor, Amor, Margarita and Corazón de Fresa.

== Track listing ==
1. Mi Amor, Amor
2. Márchate de Aquí
3. Margarita
4. Amor a Dos
5. Parte de Mí
6. Enamorada
7. Amor Volcánico
8. Cobarde
9. Corazón de Fresa
10. Súper Miedo

== Singles ==
- Mi Amor, Amor / Amor Volcánico
- Enamorada / Super Miedo

== Video Clips ==
- Amor a Dos
- Corazón de Fresa
- Cobarde
- Márchate de Aquí
- Parte de Mí
- Margarita
- Amor Volcánico
- Enamorada
