= Lucía Méndez =

Mexican actress, model and singer

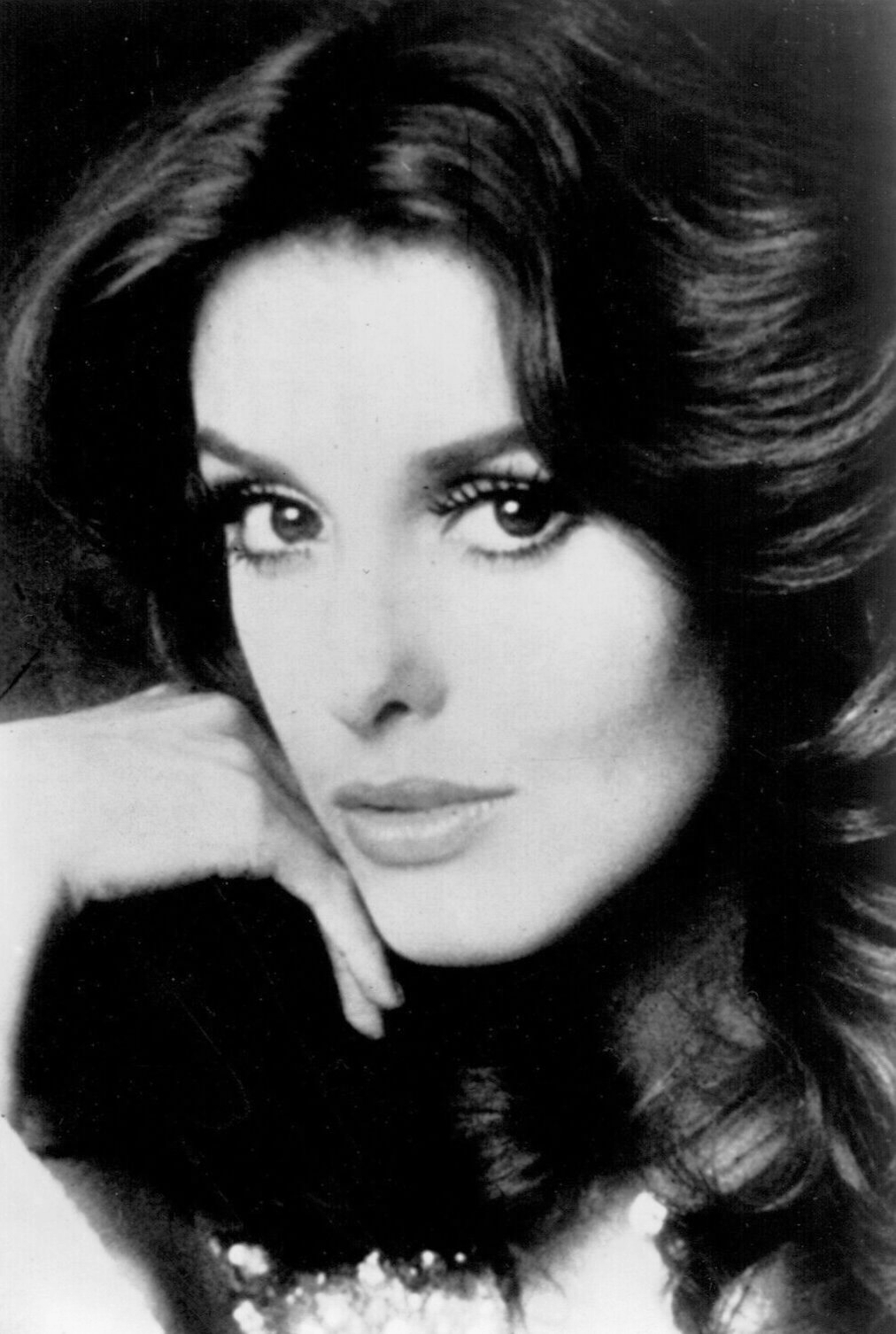
- Lucía Méndez in 1985
- Born: Lucía Leticia Méndez Pérez; January 26, 1955 (age 71); León, Guanajuato, Mexico
- Occupations: Actress; Singer
- Years active: 1971–present
- Musical career
- Genres: Latin pop
- Instruments: Vocals
- Website: luciamendez.com

Lucía Leticia Méndez Pérez (born January 26, 1955) is a Mexican actress and singer.

== Life and career ==
Lucia Méndez in 2013

Méndez was born in León, Guanajuato.

Her first work in television was in the telenovela Muchacha italiana viene a casarse (1971–1972). In 2011, Lucía starred in Mexico the telenovela Esperanza del Corazón ("Hoping Heart"), with Fernando Allende and the Mexican Broadway star Bianca Marroquín. Also in 2011, she was inducted into the Paseo de las Luminarias (Plaza of the Stars) for her work as a recording artist and in television.

She has also worked in Televisa's telenovelas “Tú o nadie”, “El extraño retorno de Diana Salazar”.

In her youth she had an affair with Luis Miguel the singer.

== Albums ==
- 2018: Feel My Body
- 2017: En Escena (en vivo)
- 2015: Bailan
- 2013: Lo Esencial de Lucía Méndez 40 Aniversario
- 2010: Canta un Homenaje a Juan Gabriel
- 2009: Otra Vez Enamorada... con un Nuevo Amanecer
- 2004: Vive
- 2001: 20 Grandes Éxitos
- 2000: Golpe Bajo (Original Soundtrack)
- 1999: Dulce Romance
- 1998: Todo o Nada
- 1994: Señora Tentación
- 1993: Se Prohibe
- 1992: Marielena (Original Soundtrack)
- 1991: Bésame
- 1990: Amor de Nadie (Single)
- 1989: Luna Morena
- 1988: Mis Íntimas Razones
- 1987: Acapulco, Acapulco (Single)
- 1986: Castígame
- 1986: Lo Mejor de Lucía Méndez
- 1985: Te Quiero
- 1984: Sólo Una Mujer
- 1983: Enamorada
- 1982: Cerca de Tí
- 1980: Regálame Esta Noche ... Colorina
- 1979: Sé Feliz
- 1978: Viviana (Original Soundtrack)
- 1977: La Sonrisa del Año
- 1977: No Te Buscaré (Single)
- 1976: Lucía Méndez
- 1975: Siempre estoy Pensando en Tí

== Filmography ==
=== Film ===
Year	Title	Roles	Notes
1972	The Champions Five Supermen	Unknown role	Uncredited
1972	Cabalgando a la luna	Beatriz	
1973	El hijo del pueblo	Carmen	
1974	El desconocido	Carmen	
1974	Juan Armenta el repatriado	Julia	
1975	El ministro y yo	Bárbara	
1976	Más Negro que la Noche	Marta	
1978	The Children of Sanchez	Martha Sánchez	
1979	La ilegal	Claudia Bernal	
1983	Los renglones torcidos de Dios	Alicia Estrada	
1986	El maleficio 2: Los enviados del infierno	Marcela	
2024	Mejor viuda que mal acompañada	Mariloli	

=== Television ===
Year	Title	Roles	Notes
1971–1972	Muchacha italiana viene a casarse	Raquel	telenovela
1973	La maestra Mendez	Maestra Mendez	Tv series
1973	Cartas sin destino	Raquel	telenovela
1974	La tierra	Olivia	telenovela
1975	Paloma	Rosa	telenovela
1976–1977	Mundos opuestos	Cecilia	telenovela
1978–1979	Viviana	Viviana Lozano	telenovela
1980–1981	Colorina	Colorina / Fernanda	telenovela
1982	Vanessa	Vanessa Reyes de Saint-Germain	telenovela
1985	Tú o nadie	Raquel Samaniego	telenovela
1988–1989	El extraño retorno de Diana Salazar	Diana Salazar / Doña Leonor de Santiago	telenovela
1990–1991	Amor de nadie	Sofía	telenovela
1992–1993	Marielena	Marielena Muñoz	telenovela
1994	Señora tentación	Rosa Moreno	telenovela
1996	Confetti	Coco Freyre	
1998–1999	Tres veces Sofía	Sofía Gutiérrez de Briseño	telenovela
2000–2001	Golpe bajo	Silvana Bernal	telenovela
2007	Amor sin maquillaje	Lupita Velázquez	TV series, various episodes
2008	Amas de casa desesperadas	Alicia Arizmendi (Mary Alice Young)	TV series, 1 episode
2008	Mujeres asesinas	Cándida Rubio	TV series, 1 episode
2009	Mi pecado	Inés Valdivia de Roura	telenovela, 2 episodes
2009	Tiempo final	Déborah	TV series, 1 episode
2010	Llena de amor	Eva Pavón de Ruiz y de Teresa	TV series, 1 episode
2011–2012	Esperanza del corazón	Lucrecia Dávila de Duprís	TV series, various episodes
2015	Como dice el dicho	Roberta Valdéz	TV series, 1 episode
2017	Las 13 esposas de Wilson Fernández	Lucía	TV series, 1 episode
2024	RuPaul's Drag Race México	guest judge	TV series; Season 2, Ep. 1
2025	Cómplices	María José	TV series; also creator and executive producer

== Singles ==
- Te Vas O Te Quedas (2014)
- Esperanza del Corazón / Cerca (2011)
- Amor Eterno (2010)
- ¿Por qué Me Haces Llorar? (2010)
- Amor de un Rato (2010)
- Un Nuevo Amanecer (2009)
- Enamorada (2009)
- Aunque Me Duela el Alma / El Cubano está Loco(2004)
- La Pareja Dispareja (2004)
- Golpe Bajo / Rehilete (2000)
- Perdóname(1999)
- Corazón de Acero (1998)
- Todo o Nada (1998)
- Ya la pagarás (1998)
- Señora Tentación / Pecadora (1994)
- Pobre Corazón (1994)
- Vete (1993)
- Se Acabó / Se Me Antoja (1992)
- Bésame / La que Más Te ha Querido (1992)
- Amor de Nadie / Amor de Nadie (Instrumental) (1990)
- Tormenta de Verano / Luna Morena (Creo en el Amor) (1990)
- Juntos por Costumbre / No Hay Hombres (1990)
- Nos Aburriremos Juntos / ¿Quién Será? (1989)
- Aventurero (1988)
- Un Alma en Pena (1988)
- Morir un Poco (1988)
- Acapulco, Acapulco (1987)
- Yo No Sé Quererte Más / Amor por Amor (1987)
- Castígame / Mariposa (1986)
- Amor Impossible / No, No Más (1986)
- Infinitamente / México (1985)
- Te Quiero / La Ola de Amor (1985)
- Corazón de Piedra / Don Corazón (1984)
- Solo una Mujer / La Luna de Cancún (1984)
- Mi Amor, Amor / Cobarde (1983)
- Enamorada / Super Miedo (1983)
- Te Tengo en Mis Manos / Contigo o sin Ti (1982)
- Culpable o Innocente / ¿Qué Clase de Hombre Eres Tú? (1982)
- Atada a Nada / Amo Todo de Ti (1982)
- Colorina / Regálame Esta Noche (1980)
- Amor de Madrugada / Paloma Blanca (1979)
- Verte una Vez Más / Tengo Sed (1979)
- Viviana / Viviana (Instrumental) (1978)
- Asómate a Mi Alma / La Estrella (1977)
- La Sonrisa del Año / Presentimiento (1977)
- No Te Buscaré / Yo Sé que Está en Tu Corazón (1977)
- Hay que Saber Perder / Cariño Nuevo (1976)
- Frente a Frente / Mi Vida está Rosa (1976)
- No Me lo Tomes a Mal / Te Solté la Rienda (1975)
- ¿Por qué Me Haces Llorar? / La Última Canción (1975)
- Siempre Estoy Pensando en Ti / ¿Qué Pasó Corazoncito? (1975)

== Music videos ==
- Te Vas O Te Quedas (2014)
- Cerca (2011)
- Amor de un Rato (2010)
- La Pareja Dispareja (2004)
- Perdóname (1999)
- Ya la Pagarás (1998)
- Señora Tentación (1994)
- Vete (1993)
- Se Acabó (1992)
- La que Más Te ha Querido (1992)
- Un Poquito de Sabor (1991)
- Tormenta de Verano (1991)
- Amor de Nadie (1990)
- Devuélveme el Amor (1990)
- Secreto (1990)
- Juntos por Costumbre (Versión 2) (1990)
- Luna Morena (1990)
- Juntos por Costumbre (Versión 1) (1990)
- Nube Viajera (1990)
- No Hay Hombres (1990)
- ¿Quién Será? (1989)
- Nos Aburriremos Juntos (1989)
- Aventurero (1988)
- Un Alma en Pena (1988)
- Yo No Sé Quererte Más (Versión 2) (1987)
- Yo No Sé Quererte Más (Versión 1) (1987)
- Castígame (1986)
- Amor Impossible (1986)
- La Ola de Amor (1985)
- Te Quiero (1985)
- Don corazón (1984)
- Corazón de Piedra (1984)
- La Luna de Cancún (1984)
- Sólo una Mujer (1984)
- Amor a Dos (1983)
- Corazón de Fresa (1983)
- Cobarde (1983)
- Márchate de Aquí (1983)
- Parte de Mí (1983)
- Margarita (1983)
- Amor Volcánico (1983)
- Enamorada (1983)
- Escúchame (1982)
- Contigo o sin Ti (1982)
- ¿Qué Clase de Hombre Eres Tú? (1982)
- Culpable o Innocente (1982)
- Estrellita del Sur (1977)
- Frente a Frente (1976)
- ¿Qué Pasó Corazoncito? (1975)
