= Ernesto Bark =

Writer, journalist and political activist based in Spain

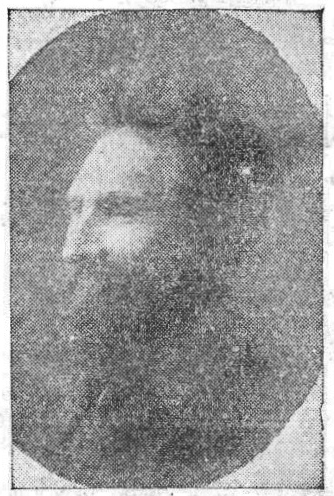
- Born: 23 March 1858; Kaava, Laiuse, Russian Empire
- Died: 24 October 1922; Madrid, Spain
- Occupation: Opinion writer, journalist, political activist, language teacher

Ernst Moritz Heinrich Bark Schultz (23 March 1858 – 24 October 1922), also known as Ernesto Bark, was a Livonian writer, journalist and political activist based in Spain. He took part in the Bohemian scene in Madrid.

== Biography ==
Born on 23 March 1858 in Kaava, Laiuse, in the vicinity of Dorpart in Estonia, then part of the Russian Empire. Regarding his self-identification, aside from presenting himself as a Livonian, he declared to have three nationalities: "the German one from an ethnographic standpoint, the Russian one from a political standpoint (and unfortunately) and the Spanish one because of affection and love". In any case, he also contextually self-identified as a Baltic German in his writings. He even declared to be "Polish" on some occasions. Pío Baroja dubbed him as a "Latvian revolutionary". He took studies in Riga, Leipzig, Munich and Berlin.

Involved in Baltic nationalist propaganda, he founded the clandestine newspaper Der Baltische Föderalist in Switzerland in 1883, whose success reportedly led to a deportation to Siberia.

He settled in Spain circa 1884 (after a previous brief stay in 1882). He lived for a time in Alicante, then in Madrid. He worked as writer for Germinal, as well as correspondent for Köln Zeitung and National Zeitung. He also earned a living in Spain as teacher of foreign languages. During his time in Madrid, he supported, along his friend Isidoro López Lapuya, Jewish immigrants coming from Russia. A noted polemicist vis-à-vis his political activity, espousing republican-socialist ideas, Bark held feuds with Pablo Iglesias Posse and Juan Montseny Carret (Federico Urales). A close acquaintance of Alejandro Sawa, the character Basilio Soulinake in Ramón María del Valle-Inclán's Luces de bohemia is based on Bark.

He became a member of the Radical Party circa 1910, developing a close friendship with Alejandro Lerroux.

Several tentative death dates, ranging from 1914 to 1924 have been reported in sources. He actually died in his home in Madrid located at Calle de Ayala 57 on 24 October 1922, as it is reported in several obituaries published in newspapers such as La Libertad or El Liberal. Instead of the Civil Cemetery, he was buried on the next day in the Almudena Cemetery following the Catholic rite professed by his wife Matilde Cabello, with whom he had six children.

He was the uncle of Pyotr Bark, minister of Finance of Nicholas II from 1914 to 1917.
