= El marqués de Bradomín. Coloquios románticos =

Play written by Ramón del Valle-Inclán

El marqués de Bradomín. Coloquios románticos (The Marquis of Bradomin. Romantic meetings), is a play by the Spanish writer Ramón del Valle-Inclán. It was first performed in 1906.

The play was a partial adaptation by the author of his own novel Sonata otoño, which had appeared five years earlier, and is about the adventures of the womanizer Marquis of Bradomin, an aristocrat with political sympathies for the Carlists.

El Marques de Bradomín was staged at the Teatro de la Princesa in Madrid on January 25, 1906. Among the actors featured were Francisco Ortega García and Matilde Moreno, as well as Josefina Blanco who later became the author's wife.
