= Azul =

Azul, meaning "blue" in Spanish and Portuguese, may refer to:

== Arts and entertainment ==
- Azul (Los Piojos album), 1998
- Azul (Cristian Castro album), 2001
  - "Azul" (song), the title song
- Azul Azul, a Bolivian pop-dance music group
- "Azul", a song by J Balvin from Colores, 2020
- "Azul", a song by Zoé from Aztlán, 2018
- "Azul", a song by Natalia Lafourcade from Hu Hu Hu, 2009
- Azul for cello, obbligato group and orchestra, by composer Osvaldo Golijov, premiered 2006
- Azul (telenovela), starring Kate del Castillo and Patricia Reyes Spíndola
- Azul..., a poetry collection by Rubén Darío
- "El Azul" (song), a 2023 song by Junior H and Peso Pluma

== Other ==
- Azul, Buenos Aires Province, a town in Argentina
- Operation Azul, the Argentine codename for the military landings that started the Falklands War
- Blue Division or División Azul, Spanish volunteers that served in the German Army during the Second World War
- Azul Systems, a software company, develops runtimes (JDKs, JVMs) for executing Java-based applications
- Azul Brazilian Airlines
- Air Azul, an American airline
- Azul (baseball), a Cuban baseball team
- Azul (board game), a 2017 tile laying game
- Gralha-azul, South American azure jaybird
