= Plaza de las Cinco Calles =

Medieval square in Pontevedra, Spain

Five Streets square
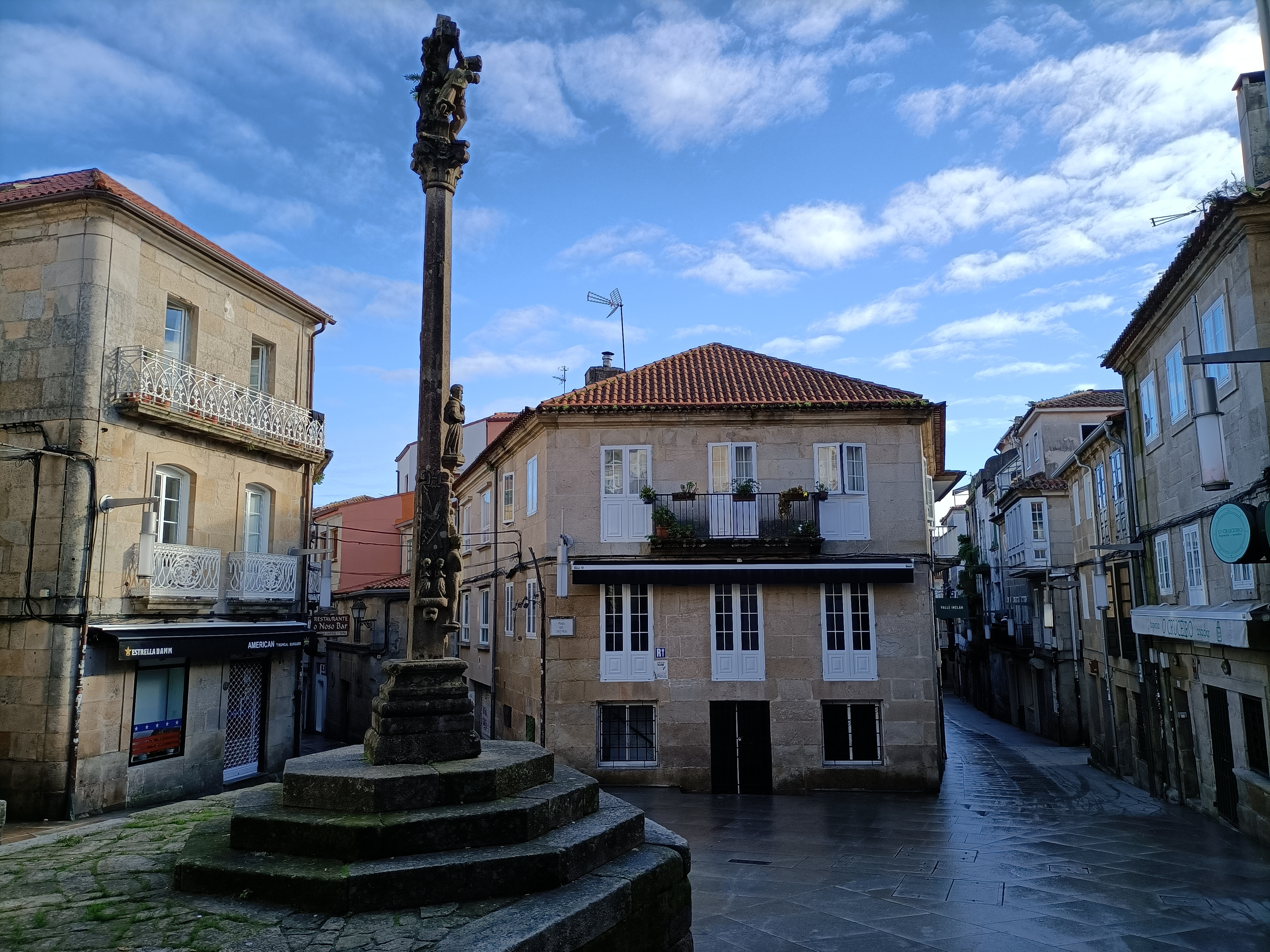
- The square with its 18th century calvary
- Native name: Plaza de las Cinco Calles (Spanish)
- Type: plaza
- Maintained by: Pontevedra City Council
- Location: Pontevedra, Spain
- Postal code: 36002
- Coordinates: 42.433556°N 8.646083°W

The Plaza de las Cinco Calles (Five Streets Square) is a square of medieval origin located in the heart of the historic centre of the city of Pontevedra (Spain).

== Origin of the name ==
The square owes its name to the fact that five streets in the historic centre converge here: the two parts of Isabel II street and Paio Gómez Chariño, Barón and San Nicolás streets.

== History ==
The square originated in the Middle Ages as a crossroads of several lanes. It was not part of the first city wall of the 12th century and was located on the outer side of the eastern gate of the walls, at the end of Paio Gómez Chariño street. The square was fortified in the 15th century and the Rouco Tower was located there. It was called Plaza de los Mendiños (name of the lower part of Isabel II Street). Later it was called Plaza de la Independencia.

At the end of the 19th century, Valle-Inclán lived in the house that borders the square on the west side between 1893 and 1895, when he wrote his book Femeninas. In the 20th century, the square was renamed Rogelio Lois Square. On the occasion of the death of Rogelio Lois in 1905, the magazine La Ilustración Gallega paid tribute to him and agreed with the Pontevedra City Council that a square would be named after him.

The square was redesigned in November 1962 by the architect and town planner Francisco Pons Sorolla with the aim of enhancing the beauty and charm of the historic area. In order to increase the public space of the square, a hierarchy of spaces was established, differentiating the central point from the adjacent areas by the installation of a prominent element, a calvary brought in 1962 from the Estribela neighbourhood, in the civil parish of Lourizán. The space of the square was modified to create a marked movement of volumes. The staircases of the different levels were coordinated with the staircase of the house to the west, resulting in a noble architectural composition. In order to preserve the typical atmosphere of the site, a house in the square was refurbished to reflect the character of old seaside houses on the coast.

On 25 April 1996, the return of the traditional toponymy of the streets and squares in the historic centre of the city was approved and the square was restored to its traditional name of Cinco Calles (Five Streets).

== Description ==
It is a small square of irregular rectangular shape, pedestrianised like the rest of the historic centre of the city. It is organised in two heights or levels due to the slope of the land that descends from one of the two hills of the historic centre, next to the Basilica of Saint Mary Major, towards the Lérez River. To the west, the upper level is separated by a small stone wall, with the calvary standing out in the corner and stairs in the middle to climb up to this stone platform. The lower part of the square, at the crossroads of the surrounding streets, is the passageway where the five streets that give it its name converge and is a tapas area, with bar and restaurant terraces on the ground floor of the traditional Galician architecture houses that surround it.

The square is dominated by a large baroque calvary dating from 1773. The calvary stands on a granite pedestal or base and is decorated with several sculptures that run along the shaft, the capital and the cross. The lower part depicts Adam and Eve being tempted by the serpent and tasting the fruit of the tree of knowledge, while on the shaft is an image of St Anthony with the Child on his lap, next to an inscription asking for a prayer for the souls in purgatory and Saint Michael the Archangel. In the upper part, on the capital, the original sin is redeemed by the crucified Christ with a friar at his side.

== Outstanding buildings ==
On the south side of the square, on the corner of Paio Gómez Chariño street, there is a Baroque house from the 18th century. It has circular oculi on the ground floor. The windows and doors have simple frames and corner pilasters.

At the end of the upper part of the square, the Baroque house at number 27, Isabel II Street, dating from 1450, has four coats of arms on its façade, three of which are almost identical, bearing the arms of the Pimentel and Figueroa families, with two scallop shells and two fig leaves in the form of a cross. One of them bears the following inscription in Gothic characters on both sides: « ESTA OBRA MAN / DOU FAZER / ESTEVAN MARTINEZ / RREGYDOR / ERA DE CCCLXXX » ("This work was commissioned by Esteban Martínez, ruler. The date is CCCLXXX"). In the centre of the façade is another larger coat of arms with fleur-de-lis, surrounded by rocaille and crowned at the top by a gentleman's great helm with a plume, whose coat of arms belongs to Melchor Francisco de Camba Flores.

== Gallery ==
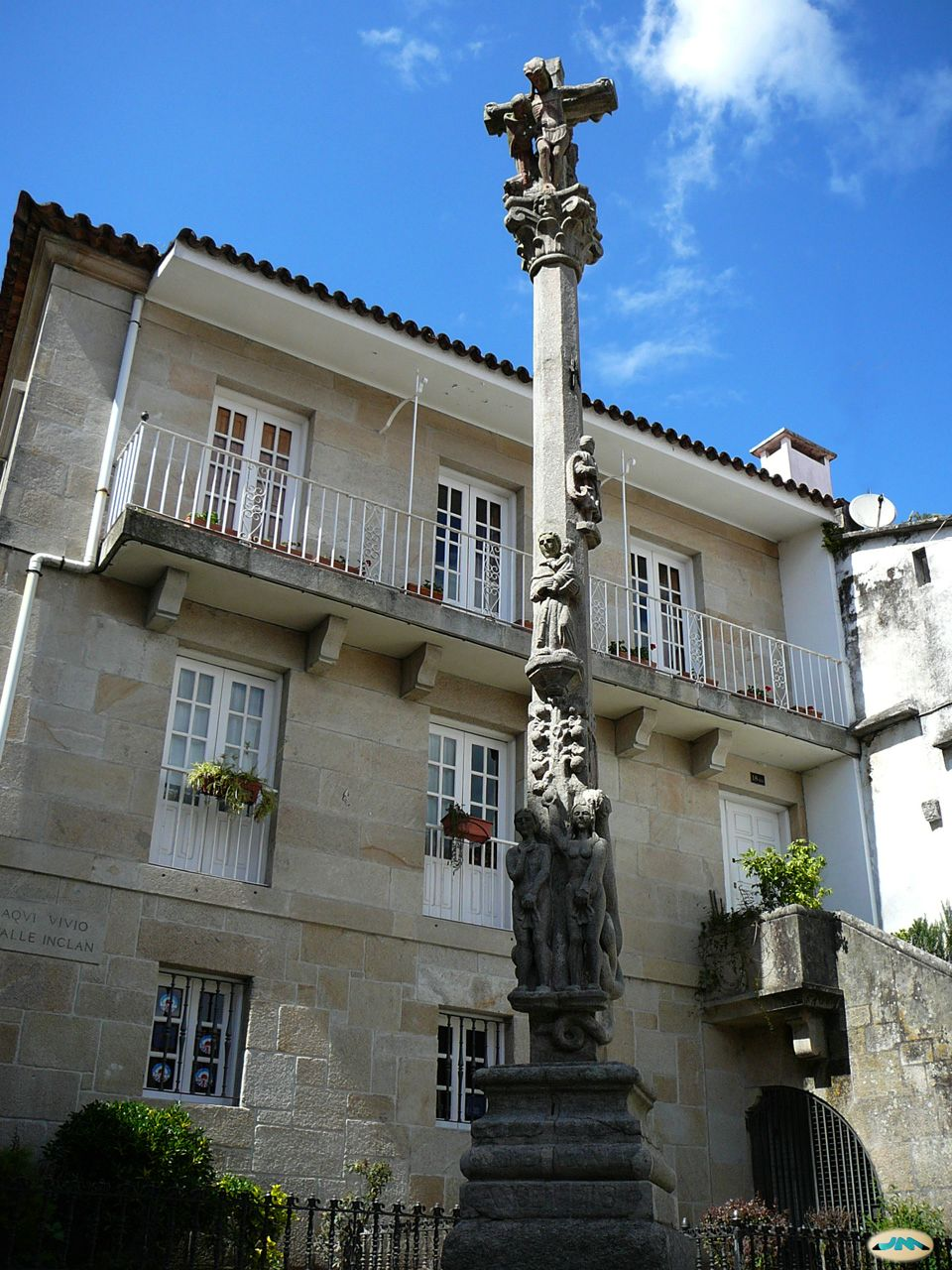
The calvary in the west of the square

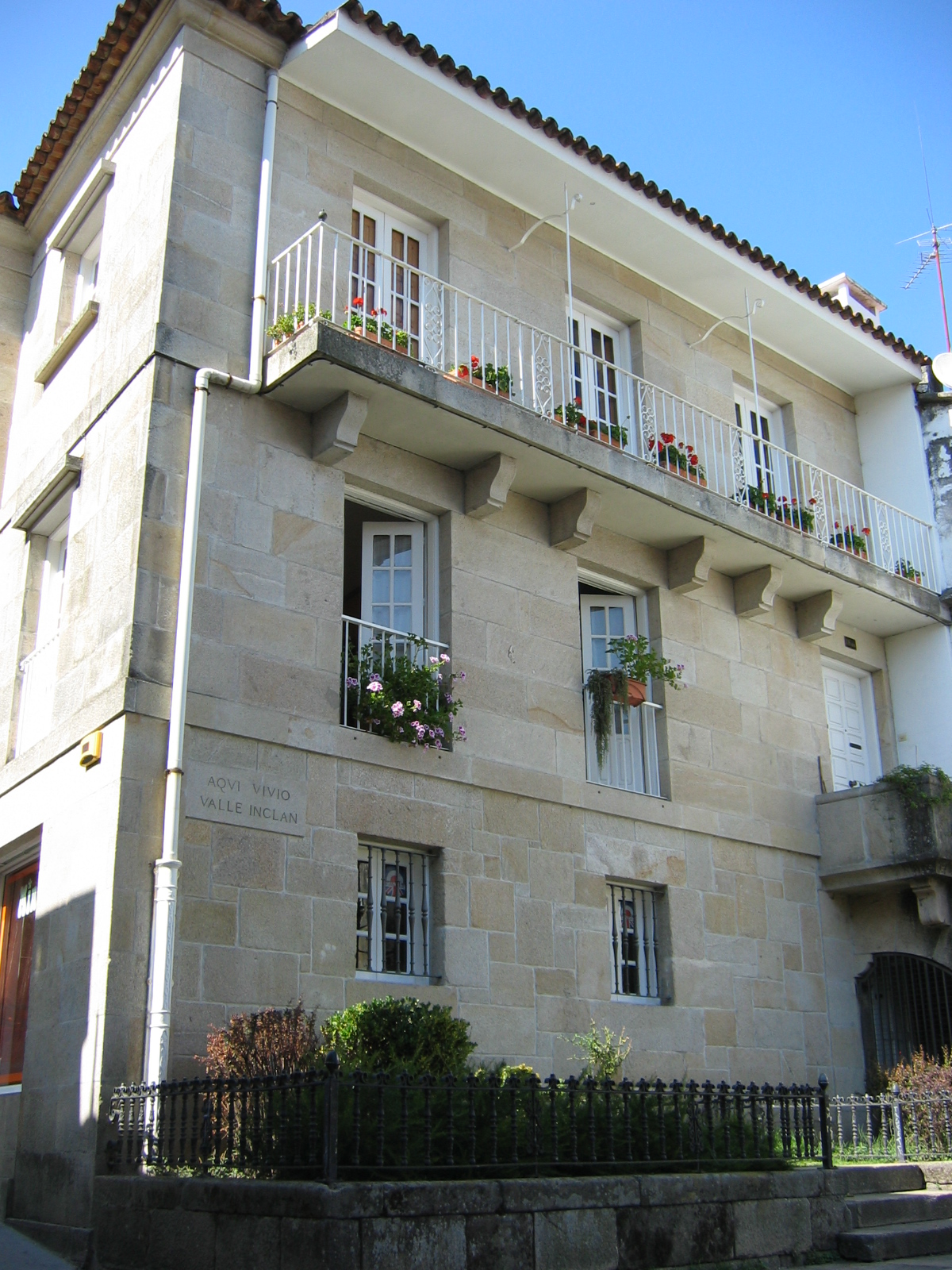
House where Valle-Inclán lived

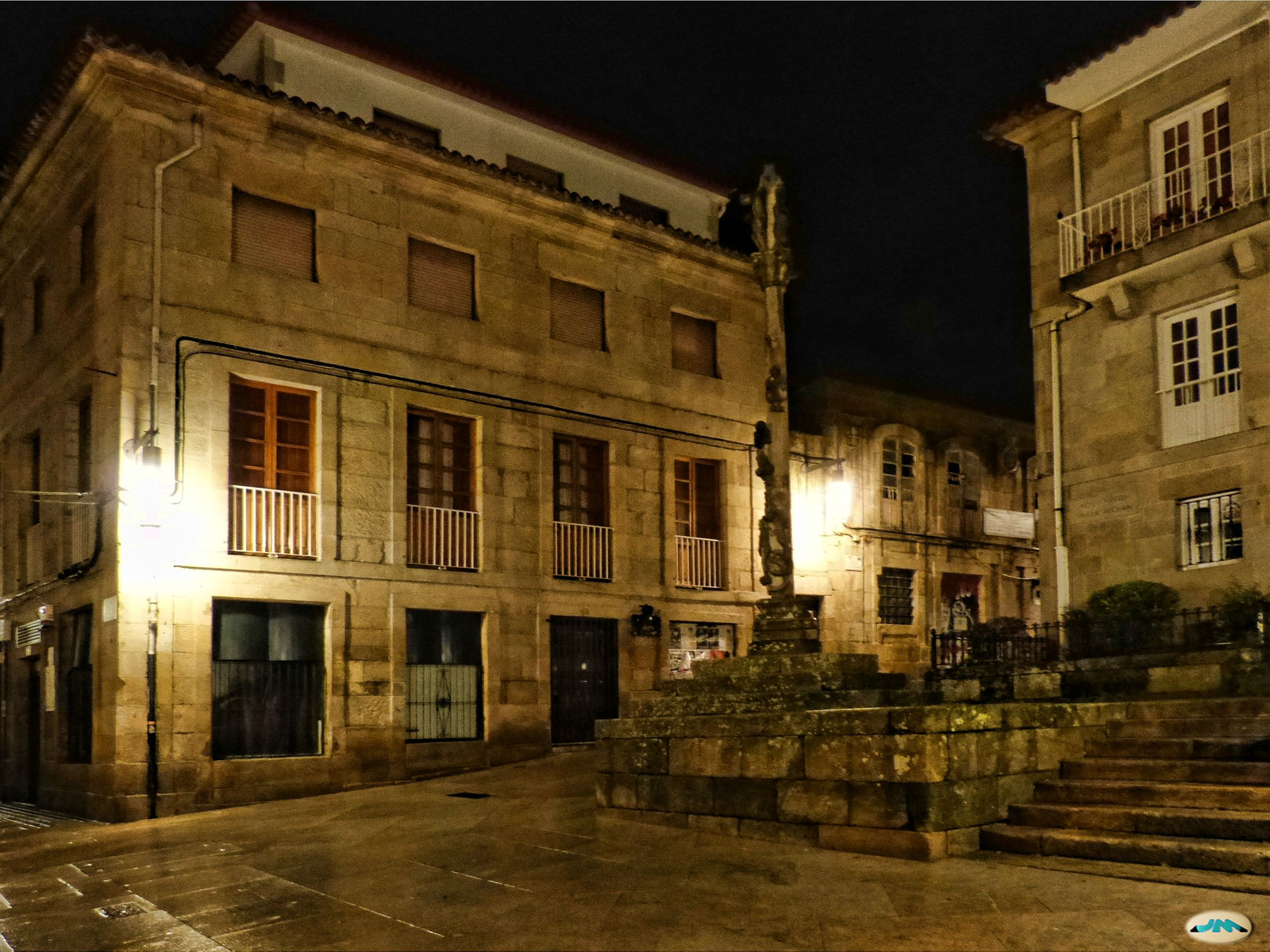
The square at night

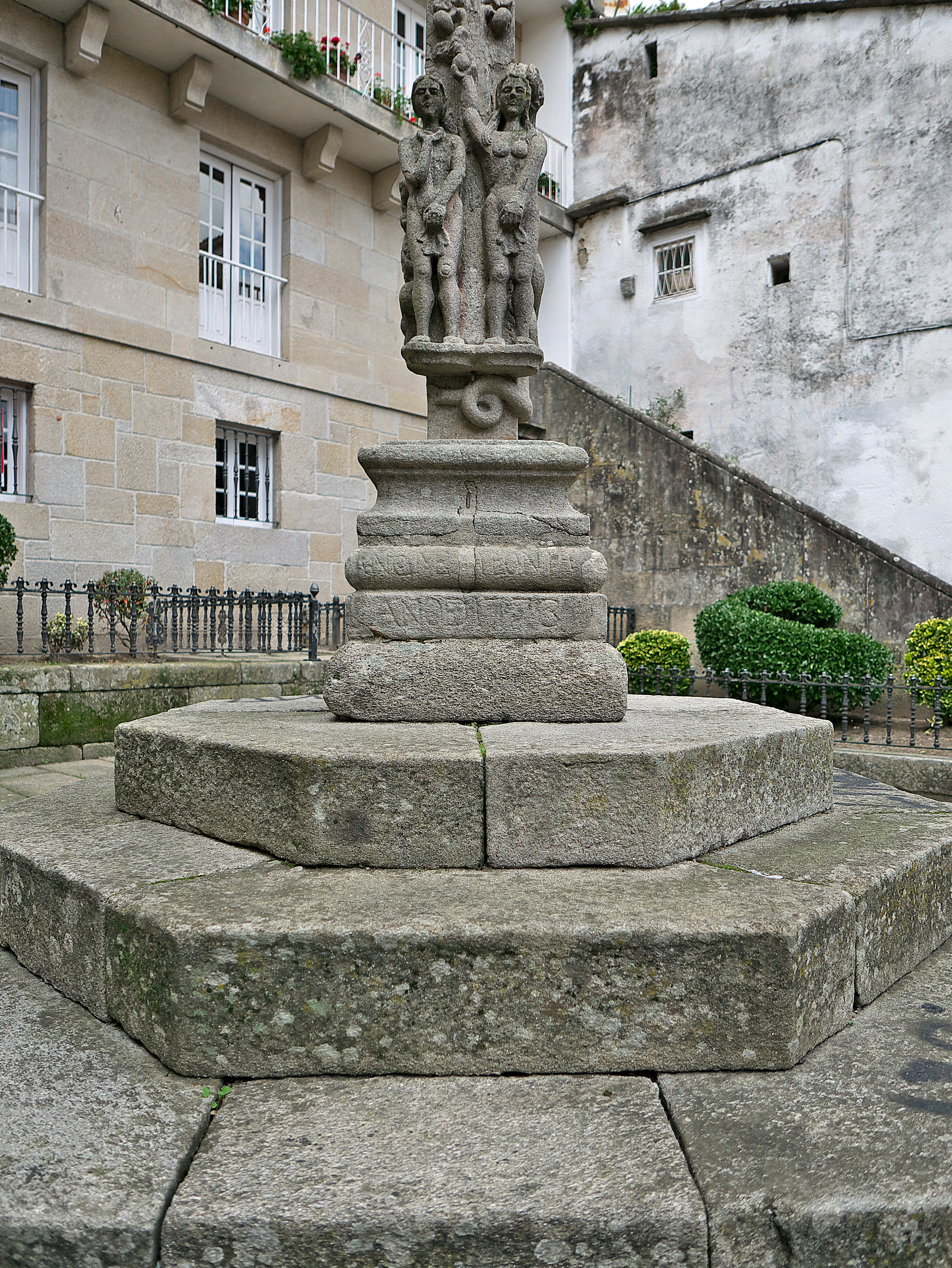
Detail of Adam and Eve on the calvary

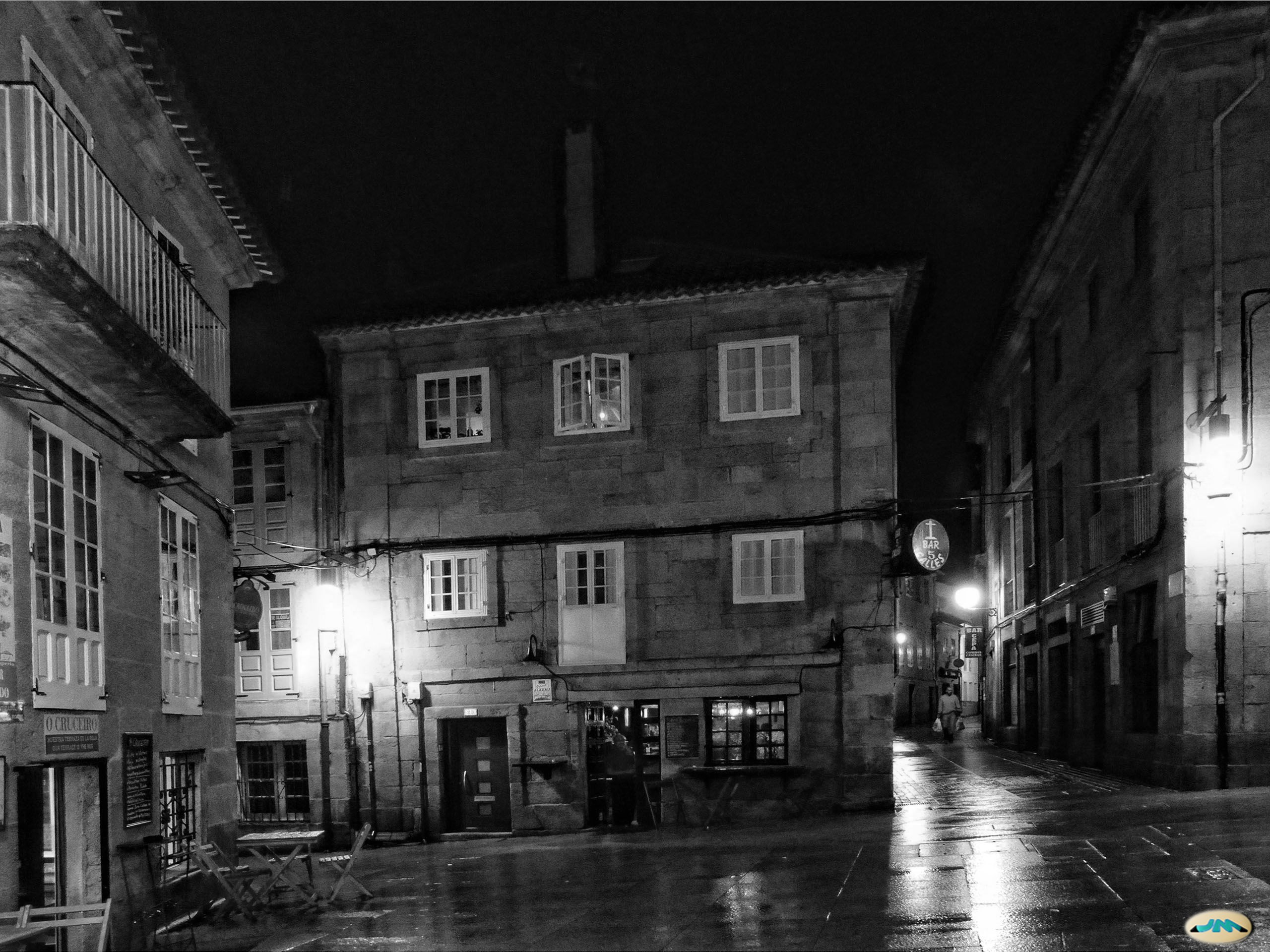
Traditional Galician houses in the square

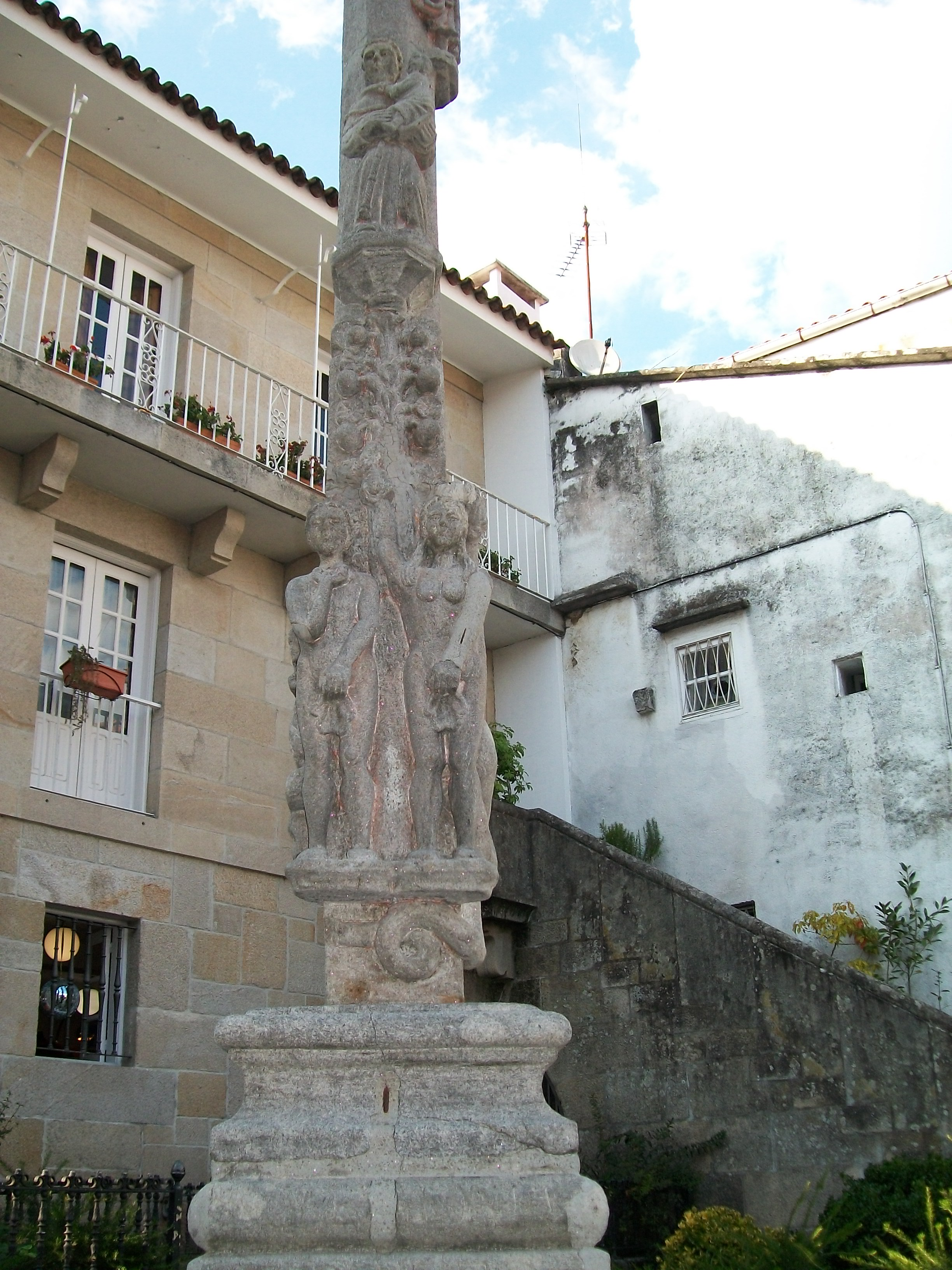
Detail of the calvary in the square

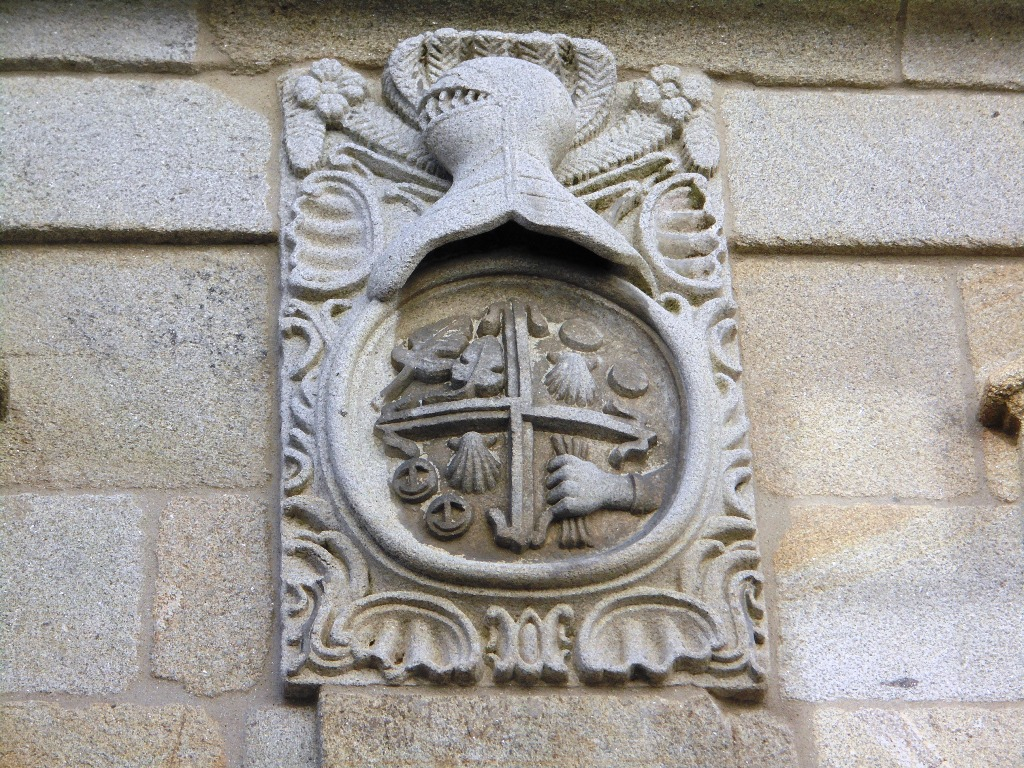
Central coat of arms of the Baroque house at 27 Isabel II Street

== See also ==
=== Bibliography ===
- Aganzo, Carlos (2010). Pontevedra. Ciudades con encanto (in Spanish). Madrid: El País-Aguilar. p. 80. ISBN 978-8403509344.
- Álvarez Pérez, Belén (2021). Pontevedra en la baja edad media: trazado urbano, arquitectura civil y militar (in Spanish). Santiago de Compostela: Universidad de Santiago de Compostela. p. 113.
- Castro Fernández, Belén María (2013). "El embellecimiento del conjunto monumental de Pontevedra durante el franquismo". Revista AGALI Journal (in Spanish). 3: 13–15. ISSN 2253-9042.
- Fontoira Surís, Rafael (2009). Pontevedra monumental (in Galician). Pontevedra: Diputación de Pontevedra. p. 158;286. ISBN 9788484573272.
- García Bujalance, Guillermo J. (2016). "Heráldica de la zona monumental de Pontevedra". Hidalguía: La revista de genealogía, nobleza y armas (in Spanish). 373: 679–714. ISSN 0018-1285.
- González Clavijo, Pepy (2008). Las calles de Pontevedra (in Spanish). Pontevedra: Deputación de Pontevedra. p. 223. ISBN 978-84-8457-312-8.
- Nieto González, Remigio (1980). Pontevedra. Guía monumental ilustrada (in Spanish). Pontevedra: Asociación de Comerciantes de la calle Manuel Quiroga. pp. 30–31.
- Riveiro Tobío, Elvira (2008). Descubrir Pontevedra (in Spanish). Pontevedra: Edicións do Cumio. p. 44. ISBN 9788482890852.

=== Related articles ===
- Old town of Pontevedra
- Ramón María del Valle-Inclán

=== External links ===
- Plaza de las Cinco Calles on the Terras de Pontevedra website
- Plaza de las Cinco Calles on the Tourism of Galicia website
- Plaza de las Cinco Calles on the CityPlan website
