= Rubén Darío =

Nicaraguan poet, journalist and writer (1867–1916)

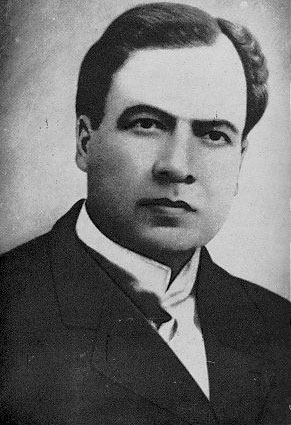
- Born: Félix Rubén García Sarmiento; 18 January 1867; Metapa, today known as Ciudad Darío, Matagalpa, Nicaragua
- Died: 6 February 1916 (aged 49); León, Nicaragua
- Occupations: Poet; journalist; diplomat; writer; Resident Minister of Foreign Affairs in Spain, Consul of Colombia in Buenos Aires, Consul of Nicaragua in Paris, France, Consul of Paraguay in Paris, France
- Spouses: Rafaela Contreras (m. 1890; died 1893); Rosario Murillo (m. 1893, ?); Francisca Sánchez del Pozo
- Writing career
- Notable works: Azul, Prosas Profanas y otros poemas, Cantos de vida y esperanza, Canto a la Argentina y otros poemas
- Movement: Modernismo

Félix Rubén García Sarmiento (18 January 1867 – 6 February 1916), known as Rubén Darío (US: /dɑːˈriːoʊ/ dah-REE-oh, Spanish: [ruˈβen daˈɾi.o]), was a Nicaraguan poet who initiated the Spanish-language literary movement known as modernismo (modernism) that flourished at the end of the 19th century. Darío had a great and lasting influence on 20th-century Spanish-language literature and journalism.

== Life ==
His parents, Manuel García and Rosa Sarmiento were married on 26 April 1866, after obtaining the necessary ecclesiastic permissions since they were second cousins. However, Manuel's conduct of allegedly engaging in excessive consumption of alcohol prompted Rosa to abandon her conjugal home and flee to the city of Metapa (modern Ciudad Darío) in Matagalpa where she gave birth to Félix Rubén. The couple made up and Rosa even gave birth to a second child, a daughter named Cándida Rosa, who died a few days after being born. The marriage deteriorated again to the point where Rosa left her husband and moved in with her aunt, Bernarda Sarmiento. After a brief period of time, Rosa Sarmiento established a relationship with another man and moved with him to San Marcos de Colón, in Choluteca, Honduras.

However, according to his baptism, Rubén's true surname was García, his paternal family had been known by the surname Darío for many years. Rubén Darío explained it as follows in his autobiography:

According to what some of the old people in that town of my childhood have referred to me, my great-grandfather had Darío as his nickname or first name. In this small town he was known by everyone as "Don Darío" and his entire family as the Daríos. It was in this way that his and all his family last name began to disappear to the point where my paternal great-grandmother already replaced it when she signed documents as Rita Darío; becoming patronymic and acquiring legal stand and validity since my father, who was a merchant, carried out all his businesses as Manuel Darío...

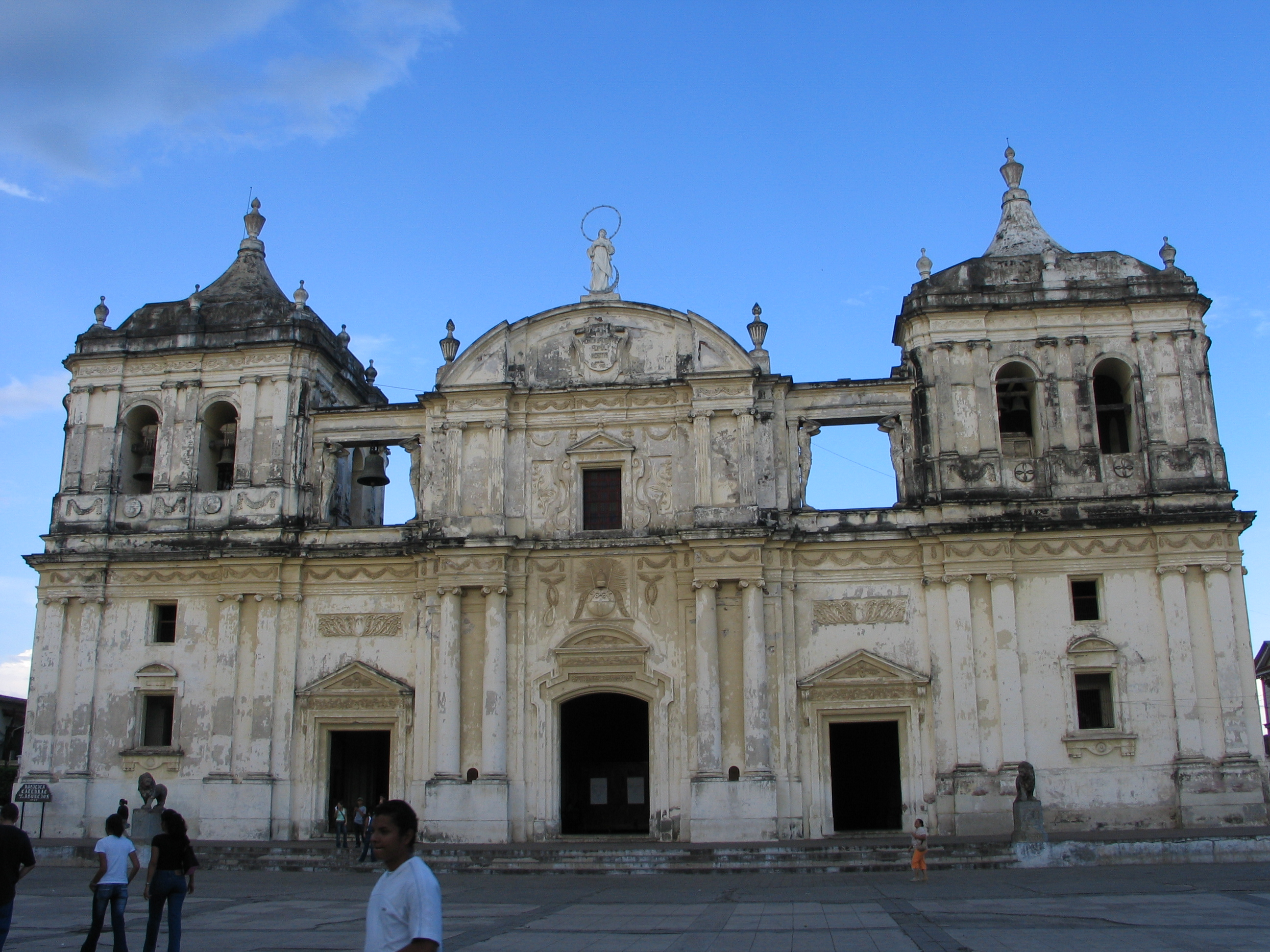
The catedral-basílica de la Asunción, in León, Nicaragua, where the poet spent his infancy. His remains are buried in this church.

Darío spent his childhood in the city of León Nicaragua. He was brought up by his mother's aunt and uncle, Félix and Bernarda, whom Darío considered, in his infancy, to be his real parents. (He reportedly, during his first years in school, signed his assignments as Félix Rubén Ramírez.) He rarely spoke with his mother, who lived in Honduras, or with his father, who he referred to as "Uncle Manuel". Although little is known about his first years, it is documented that after the death of Félix Ramírez, in 1871, the family went through rough economic times and they considered sending young Rubén as a tailor's apprentice. According to his biographer Edelberto Torres, he attended several schools in León before going on, during 1879 and 1880, to be educated by the Jesuits.

A precocious reader (according to his own testimony, he learned to read when he was three years old), he soon began to write his first verses: a sonnet written by him in 1879 is conserved, and he published for the first time in a newspaper when he was thirteen years old. The elegy, Una lágrima, which was published in the daily El Termómetro (Rivas) on 26 July 1880. A little later he also collaborated in El Ensayo, a literary magazine in León, garnering attention as a "child poet". In these initial verses, according to Teodosio Fernández, his predominating influences were Spanish poets contemporary to José Zorrilla, Ramón de Campoamor, Gaspar Núñez de Arce and Ventura de la Vega. His writings of this time display a liberalism hostile to the Roman Catholic Church, as documented in his essay, El jesuita, which was written in 1881. Regarding his political attitude, his most noteworthy influence was the Ecuadorian Juan Montalvo, whom he deliberately imitated in his first journalistic articles.

Around December 1881 he moved to the capital, Managua, at the request of some liberal politicians that had conceived the idea that, given his gift for poetry, he should be educated in Europe at the expense of the public treasury. However, the anti-clerical tone of his verses did not convince the president of congress, the conservative Pedro Joaquín Chamorro Alfaro, and it was resolved that he would study in the Nicaraguan city of Granada, but Rubén opted to stay in Managua, where he continued his journalistic endeavor collaborating with the newspapers El Ferrocarril and El Porvenir de Nicaragua. In the capital, he fell in love with an eleven-year-old girl, Rosario Emelina Murillo, whom he wanted to marry. He traveled to El Salvador in August 1882, at the petition of his friends who wanted to delay his marriage plans. It wasn't uncommon for people of Darío's age of 14 to marry.

=== In El Salvador ===
In El Salvador, Darío was introduced to the president of the republic, Rafael Zaldivar, by Joaquín Mendez, a poet who took him under his wing. There, he met the Salvadoran poet Francisco Gavidia, a connoisseur of French poetry. Under the auspices of Gavidia, Darío attempted, for the first time, to adapt the French Alexandrine metric into Castilian verse. Although he enjoyed much fame and an intense social life in El Salvador, participating in celebrations such as the centenary of the birth of Simón Bolívar, things began to get worse. He encountered economic hardships and contracted smallpox. In October 1883, still convalescent, he returned to his native homeland. After his return, he briefly resided in León and then in Granada but he finally moved again to Managua, where he became an employee of the Biblioteca Nacional de Nicaragua (the National Library of Nicaragua) and he resumed his romance with Rosario Murillo. In May 1884 he was condemned for vagrancy and sentenced to eight days of public work, although he managed to evade the fulfillment of the sentence. During that time he continued experimenting with new poetic forms, and he even had a book ready for printing, which was going to be titled Epístolas y poemas. This second book also did not get published, it would have to wait until 1888 when it was finally published as Primeras notas. He tested his luck with theatre, and he released his first play, titled Cada oveja..., which had some success, but no copy remains. He found life in Managua unsatisfactory, and prompted by the advice of some friends, opted to embark for Chile on 5 June 1886.

=== In Chile ===
After making a name for himself with love-poems and stories, Darío left Nicaragua for Chile in 1886, and disembarked in Valparaíso on 23 June 1886. In Chile he stayed with Eduardo Poirier and a poet by the name of Eduardo de la Barra. Together they co-authored a sentimental novel titled Emelina, which they entered in a literary contest (although they did not win). It was because of his friendship with Poirier that Darío was able to obtain a job with the newspaper La Época, in Santiago in July 1886.

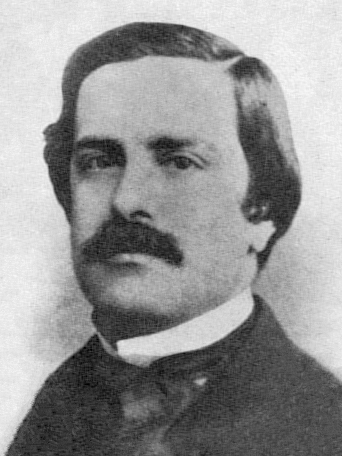
Juan Valera, novelist and literary critic, whose letters, addressed to Ruben Darío in the periodical El Imparcial, decisively consecrated Rubén Darío.

During his stay in Chile, Darío had to endure continuous humiliation from the Chilean aristocracy that scorned him for his lack of refinement and for the color of his skin. Nonetheless, he managed to forge a few friendships, like the one with the son of the then president, the poet Pedro Balmaceda Toro. Soon after, he published his first piece, Abrojos, in March 1887. For several months until September 1887, he lived in Valparaíso, where he participated in several literary contests. In July 1888, his book Azul..., the key literary work of the modernist revolution that had just begun, was published in Valparaíso.

Azul... is a compilation of a series of poems and textual prose that had already been published in the Chilean media between December 1886 and June 1888. The book was not an immediate success, but was well received by the influential Spanish novelist and literary critic Juan Valera, who published in the Madrid newspaper El Imparcial, in October 1888, two letters addressed to Darío, in which, although reproaching him for the excessive French influence in his writings (Valera used the expression "galicismo mental" or 'mental Gallicism'), he recognized in Darío "un prosista y un poeta de talento" ("a prose-writer and poet of talent").

=== Journey in Central America ===
The newly attained fame allowed Darío to obtain the position of newspaper correspondent for La Nación of Buenos Aires, which was at the time the most heavily circulated periodical in Hispanic America. A little after sending his first article to La Nacion, he set off on a trip back to Nicaragua. During a brief stop in Lima he met the writer Ricardo Palma. He arrived at the port in Corinto on 7 March 1889. In León, he was received as a guest of honor, but his stay in Nicaragua was brief, and he moved to San Salvador, where he was named director of the periodical La Unión which was in favor of creating a unified Central American state. In San Salvador, he was married by law to Rafaela Contreras, daughter of a famous Honduran orator, Álvaro Contreras, on 21 June 1890. One day after the wedding there was a coup d'état against president (and general) Menéndez. The coup was mainly engineered by general Carlos Ezeta, who had been a guest at Darío's wedding.

He decided to leave El Salvador despite job offers from the new president. He moved to Guatemala at the end of June, while his bride remained in El Salvador. Guatemalan president Manuel Lisandro Barillas was making preparations for a war against El Salvador. Darío published, in the Guatemalan newspaper El Imparcial, an article titled Historia Negra in which he denounced Ezeta's betrayal of Menéndez. In December 1890 he was tasked with directing a newly created newspaper, El Correo de São Paulo. That same year the second edition of his successful book Azul..., substantially expanded, and using Valera's letters, which catapulted him to literary fame, as prologue (it is now customary that these letters appear in every edition of this book), was published in Guatemala. In January 1891 his wife reunited with him in Guatemala and they were married by the church on 11 February 1891. Three months later, the periodical which Darío was editing, El Correo de la Tarde, ceased receiving government subsidies, which forced it to close. He moved to Costa Rica and installed himself in the country's capital, San Jose, in August 1891. While in Costa Rica, he was haunted by debt despite being employed and was barely able to support his family. His first son, Rubén Darío Contreras, was born on 12 November 1891.

=== Travels ===
In 1892, he left his family in Costa Rica, and traveled to Guatemala and Nicaragua, in search for better economic prospects. Eventually, the Nicaraguan government named him a member of the Nicaraguan delegation to Madrid, where events were going to take place to commemorate the fourth centennial of the discovery of America. During the trip to Spain, Darío made a stop in Havana, where he met Julián del Casal and other artists, such as Aniceto Valdivia and Raoul Cay. On 14 August 1892, he disembarked in Santander, where he continued his journey to Madrid via train. Among those with whom he interacted frequently were poets Gaspar Núñez de Arce, José Zorrilla and Salvador Rueda; novelists Juan Valera and Emilia Pardo Bazán; erudite Marcelino Menéndez Pelayo; and several distinguished politicians such as Emilio Castelar and Antonio Cánovas del Castillo. In November, he returned to Nicaragua, where he received a telegram from San Salvador notifying him of his wife's illness; she died on 23 January 1893.

At the onset of 1893, Ruben remained in Managua, where he renewed his affairs with Rosario Murillo, whose family forced Darío to marry her.

=== In Argentina ===
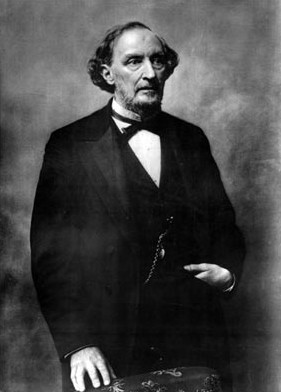
Bartolomé Mitre, to whom Darío dedicated his ode: Oda a Mitre.

Darío was well received by the intellectual media of Buenos Aires. He collaborated with several newspapers: in addition to La Nación, to which he was already a correspondent, he published articles in La Prensa, La Tribuna and El Tiempo, to name a few. His position as the Colombian consul was merely honorific, since, as Darío has stated in his autobiography: "no había casi colombianos en Buenos Aires y no existían transacciones ni cambios comerciales entre Colombia y la República Argentina." In the Argentinian capital he led a bohemian life-style and his abuse of alcohol led to the need for medical care in several occasions. Among the personalities with whom he dealt were the politician Bartolomé Mitre, the Mexican poet Federico Gamboa, the Bolivian poet Ricardo Jaimes Freyre and the Argentinian poets Rafael Obligado and Leopoldo Lugones.

His mother, Rosa Sarmiento, died on 3 May 1895. In October 1895, the Colombian government abolished its consulate in Buenos Aires depriving Darío of an important source of income. As a remedy, he obtained a job as Carlos Carlés's secretary, who was the general director of the institution handling mail and telegrams in Argentina. In 1896, in Buenos Aires, Darío published two of his most crucial books: Los raros, a collection of articles about the writers that most interested him, and second, Prosas profanas y otros poemas, the book that established the most definite consecration of Spanish literary modernism. However popular it became, though, his work was not initially well received. His petitions to the Nicaraguan government for a diplomatic position went unattended; however, the poet discovered an opportunity to travel to Europe when he learned that La Nación needed a Correspondent in Spain to inform about the situation in the European country after Spain's disaster of 1898. It is from the United States military intervention in Cuba that Rubén Darío coined, two years before José Enrique Rodó, the metaphorical opposition between Ariel (a personification of Latin America) and Calibán (a monster which represents the United States of America.) On 3 December 1898, Darío decamped to Europe, arriving in Barcelona three weeks later.

=== Between Paris and Spain ===
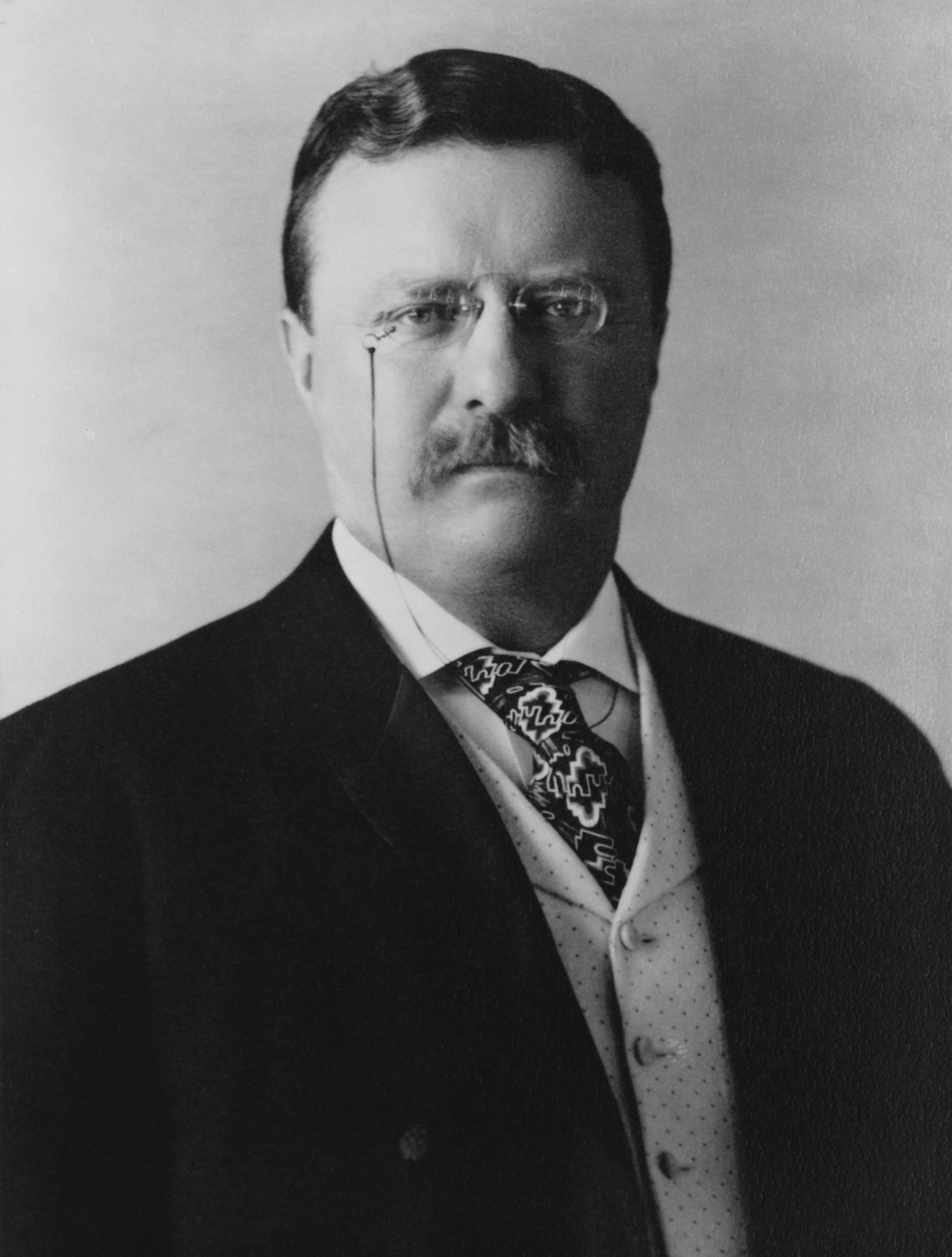
Darío wrote a poem directed to the President of the United States at the time, Theodore Roosevelt

Darío arrived in Spain committed to sending four chronicles per month to La Nación about the prevalent mood in the Spanish nation after the defeat it suffered to the United States of America, and the loss of its colonial possessions; Cuba, Puerto Rico, the Philippines, and Guam. These chronicles would end up being compiled in a book that was published in 1901, titled España Contemporánea. Crónicas y retratos literarios. In the writings, he expresses his profound sympathy towards Spain, and his confidence in Spain's revival, despite the state of despair he observed. In Spain, Darío won the admiration of a group of young poets who defended Modernism (a literary movement that was not absolutely accepted by the most established writers, especially those belonging to the Real Academia Española.) Among these young modernists there were a few writers that would later have important roles in Spanish literature such as Juan Ramón Jiménez, Ramón María del Valle-Inclán and Jacinto Benavente, and some that were prevalent in their time, like Francisco Villaespesa, Mariano Miguel de Val, director of the magazine Ateneo, and Emilio Carrere.

In 1899, Rubén Darío, who was still legally married to Rosario Murillo, met Francisca Sánchez del Pozo in the Casa de Campo of Madrid. Francisca was from Navalsauz in the province of Ávila and would be his companion through the last years of his life. In April 1900, Darío visited Paris for a second time, commissioned by La Nación to cover the Exposition Universelle that took place that year in the French capital city. His chronicles about this topic would later be compiled in the book Peregrinaciones.

During the first years of the 20th century, Darío lived in Paris, where in 1901 published the second edition of Prosas profanas. That same year Francisca and Rubén had a daughter. After giving birth she traveled to Paris to reunite with him, leaving the baby girl in the care of her grandparents. The girl died of smallpox during this period, without her father ever meeting her. In March 1903 he was appointed as consul by Nicaragua. His second child by Francisca was born in April 1903, but also died at a very young age. During those years, Darío traveled through Europe, visiting, among other countries, the United Kingdom, Belgium, Germany, and Italy. In 1905, he went to Spain as a member of a committee named by the Nicaraguan government whose task was to resolve a territorial dispute with Honduras. That year he published, in Madrid, the third of his most important poetry books, Cantos de vida y esperanza, los cisnes y otros poemas, edited by Juan Ramón Jiménez. Some of his most memorable poems came to light in 1905, like "Salutación del optimista" and "A Roosevelt", in which he extols Hispanic traits in the face of the threat of United States imperialism. The second poem (below) was directed at then president of the United States, Theodore Roosevelt:

Eres los Estados Unidos,
eres el futuro invasor
de la América ingenua que tiene sangre indígena,
que aún reza a Jesucristo y aún habla en español

Translation:

You are the United States
you are the future invader
of the naive America that has indigenous blood
that still prays to Jesus Christ and that still speaks Spanish

In 1906 he participated as secretary of the Nicaraguan delegation to the Third Pan-American Conference held in Rio de Janeiro where he was inspired to write his poem "Salutación del águila", which offers a view of the United States very different from that offered in prior poems:

Bien vengas, mágica águila de alas enormes y fuertes
a extender sobre el Sur tu gran sombra continental,
a traer en tus garras, anilladas de rojos brillantes,
una palma de gloria, del color de la inmensa esperanza,
y en tu pico la oliva de una vasta y fecunda paz.

Translation:

Come, magic eagle with the great and strong wings
to extend over the South your great continental shade,
to bring in your claws, adorned with red bright rings,
a palm of glory of the color of the immense hope,
and in your beak the olive branch of a vast and fecund peace.

This poem was criticized by several writers who did not understand Ruben's sudden change of opinion with respect to the United States' influence in Latin America. In Rio de Janeiro, the poet was involved in an obscure romance with an aristocrat, believed to be the daughter of the Russian ambassador in Brazil. It seems that he then conceived the idea of divorcing Rosario Murillo, from whom he had been separated for years. On his way back to Europe, he made a brief stop in Buenos Aires. In Paris, he reunited with Francisca and together they spent the winter of 1907 on the island of Mallorca, which he later frequented the company of Gabriel Alomar, a futurist poet, and painter Santiago Rusiñol. He began writing a novel, La Isla de Oro, which he never finished, although some of its chapters were published in La Nación. His tranquility was interrupted by the arrival of his wife, Rosario Murillo, in Paris. She would not grant him a divorce unless she was guaranteed sufficient compensation, which Darío felt was disproportionate. By March 1907, when he was leaving for Paris, his alcoholism was very advanced and he fell gravely ill. On recuperating, he returned to Paris, but he was unable to reach an agreement with his wife, so he decided to return to Nicaragua to present his case in court.

=== Ambassador in Madrid ===
After two brief stops in New York and Panama, Darío arrived in Nicaragua where he was given a warm welcome. Regardless of the tributes offered to him, he failed to obtain a divorce. In addition, he was not paid what was owed to him from his position as consul; this left him unable to return to Paris. After a few months he managed to be named resident minister in Madrid for the Nicaraguan government of José Santos Zelaya. He had economic problems since his limited budget barely allowed him to meet all of his delegation's expenses, and he had much economic difficulty while he was Nicaraguan ambassador. He managed to get by, partly with his salary from La Nación and partly with the help of his friend and director of the magazine Ateneo, Mariano Miguel de Val, who, while the economic situation was at its toughest, offered himself as secretary to the Nicaraguan delegation at no charge and offered his house, number 27 Serrano street, to serve as the diplomatic quarters of the Nicaraguan delegation. When Zelaya was overthrown, Darío was forced to resign his diplomatic post on 25 February 1909. He remained loyal to Zelaya, whom he had heavily praised in his book Viaje a Nicaragua e Intermezzo tropical, and with whom he had collaborated in the writing of Estados Unidos y la revolución de Nicaragua. In that work the United States and the Guatemalan dictator Manuel Estrada Cabrera were accused of planning the overthrow of the Zelaya government. During his time as ambassador, there was a rift between Darío and his former friend Alejandro Sawa, whose requests for economic assistance went unheard by Darío. The correspondence between them gives room to interpret that Sawa was the real author of several of the articles that Darío had published in La Nación.

=== Last years ===
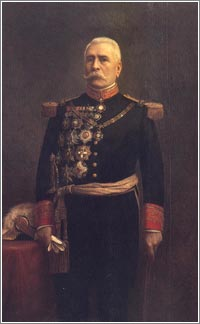
Porfirio Díaz, Mexican dictator who refused to receive the writer.

In 1910, Darío traveled to Mexico as a member of a Nicaraguan delegation to commemorate a century of Mexican independence. However, the Nicaraguan government changed while Darío was abroad, and Mexican dictator Porfirio Díaz refused to receive the writer, an attitude that was probably influenced by United States diplomacy. Darío, however, was well received by the people of Mexico, who supported Darío and not the government.

In his autobiography, Darío relates those protests with the Mexican Revolution, which was about to occur:

For the first time in thirty three years of absolute control, the house of the old Caesarean emperor had been stoned. One could say that that was the first thunder of the revolution that brought the dethronement.

In light of the slight by the Mexican government, Darío left for La Habana, where, under the effects of alcohol, he attempted to commit suicide, perhaps triggered by the way he had been scorned. In November 1910 he returned to Paris, where he continued being a correspondent for La Nación and where he took a position for the Mexican Ministry of Public Instruction (Ministerio de Instrucción Pública) which may have been given to him as a compensation for the public humiliation inflicted upon him.

In 1912 he accepted an offer from the Uruguayan businessmen Rubén and Alfredo Guido to direct the magazines Mundial and Elegancias. To promote said publications, he went on tour in Latin America visiting, among other cities, Rio de Janeiro, São Paulo, Montevideo and Buenos Aires. It was also around this time that the poet wrote his autobiography, which was published in the magazine Caras y caretas under the title of La vida de Rubén Darío escrita por él mismo; and the work Historia de mis libros which is very important when learning about his literary evolution.

After ending his journey due to the end of his contract with the Guido brothers, he returned to Paris and in 1913, invited by Joan Sureda, he traveled to Mallorca and found quarters at the Carthusian monastery of Valldemosa, where many decades into the past figures such as Chopin and George Sand had resided. It was in this island where Ruben began writing the novel El oro de Mallorca, which was a fictionalization of his autobiography. The deterioration of his mental health became accentuated, however, due to his alcoholism. In December he headed back to Barcelona, where he lodged at General Zelaya's house. Zelaya had taken Darío under his wing when he was president of Nicaragua. In January 1914 he returned to Paris, where he entered a lengthy legal battle with the Guido brothers, who still owed him a large sum of money for the work he had done for them. In May he moved to Barcelona, where he published his last important work of poetry, Canto a la Argentina y otros poemas, which includes the laudatory poem he had written to Argentina, which had been made to order for La Nación.

== Death ==
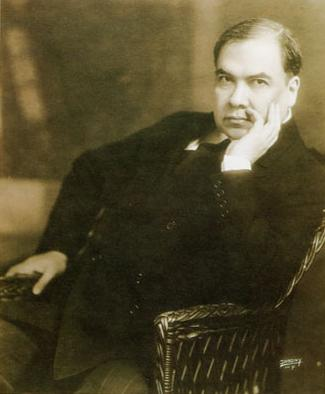
Darío in 1915

Darío died on 6 February 1916, aged 49, in León. The funeral lasted several days, and he was interred in the city's cathedral on 13 February 1973 at the base of the statue of Saint Paul near the chancel under a lion made of marble by the sculptor Jorge Navas Cordonero.

== Poetry ==
=== Range ===
Darío wrote in thirty seven different metrical lines and 136 different stanza forms.

=== Influences ===
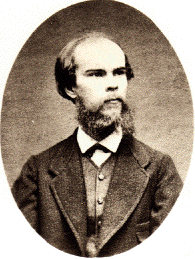
Paul Verlaine, a decisive influence in Darío's poetry.

French poetry was a determinant influence in Darío's formation as a poet. In the first place, the romantics, particularly Victor Hugo. Later on, and in a decisive fashion, Darío was influenced by the parnassians: Théophile Gautier, Catulle Mendès, and José María de Heredia. Another decisive influence was the writer of prose and poetry and national hero of Cuba, Jose Martí. The final defining element of Darianian aesthetic is his admiration towards the symbolists, especially Paul Verlaine. Recapitulating his own poetic trajectory in the initial poem of Cantos de vida y esperanza (1905) Darío himself synthesized his main influences when he affirms that he was "strong towards Hugo and ambiguous towards Verlaine" ("con Hugo fuerte y con Verlaine ambiguo".)

In the section "Palabras Liminares" of Prosas Profanas (1896) he had already written a paragraph that reveals the importance of French culture in the development of his literary work:

The old Spaniard with a white beard points towards a series of illustrious portraits: "This one—he says—is the great Miguel de Cervantes Saavedra, one-handed genius; this one is Lope de Vega, this one is Garcilaso, this one Quintana." I ask him for the noble man Gracián, for Teresa of Ávila, for the brave Góngora and the strongest of all, Francisco de Quevedo y Villegas. Then I say: "Shakespeare! Dante! Hugo...! (and in my head: Verlaine...!)"
Then, when saying goodbye: "-Old man, it is important to say: my wife is from my land; my mistress is from Paris."

Los raros is an illustrative volume regarding literary tastes, which he published on the same year as Prosas profanas, and dedicated to briefly glossing some of the writers and intellectuals towards whom he felt profound admiration. Amongst those in the book we find Edgar Allan Poe, Villiers de l'Isle Adam, Léon Bloy, Paul Verlaine, Lautréamont, Eugénio de Castro and José Martí (the latter being the only one mentioned who wrote their literary work in Spanish.) The predominance of French culture is more than evident. Darío wrote: "Modernism is nothing more than Spanish verse and prose passed through the fine sieve of the good French verse and the good French prose." Setting aside his initial stage, before Azul..., in which his poetry owes a great deal to the great names of 19th-century Spanish poetry, such as Núñez de Arce and Campoamor, Darío was a great admirer of Bécquer. Spanish themes are well represented in his work, already in Prosas profanas and, specially, after his second trip to Spain, in 1899. Conscious of contemporaneous Spanish decadence in politics and the arts (a preoccupation he shared with the so-called Generation of '98), he frequently was inspired by characters and elements of the past. Regarding authors in other languages, it is worth mentioning that he felt a profound admiration towards three writers from the United States: Ralph Waldo Emerson, Edgar Allan Poe and Walt Whitman.

== Assessment ==
Roberto González Echevarría considers him the beginning of the modern era in Spanish language poetry: "In Spanish, there is poetry before and after Rubén Darío. ... the first major poet in the language since the 17th century ... He ushered Spanish-language poetry into the modern era by incorporating the aesthetic ideals and modern anxieties of Parnassiens and Symbolism, as Garcilaso had infused Castilian verse with Italianate forms and spirit in the 16th century, transforming it forever. Darío led one of the most profound poetic revolutions in Spanish according to Latin American poet Octavio Paz, who wrote a prologue to a translation of Darío's selected poems.

=== Evolution ===
The evolution of Darío's poetry is marked by the publication of the books in which scholars have recognized his fundamental works: Azul... (1888), Prosas profanas y otros poemas (1896) y Cantos de vida y esperanza (1905). Before Azul... Darío wrote three books and a great number of loose poems which make up what is known as his "literary prehistory" ("prehistoria literaria".) The books are Epístolas y poemas (written in 1885, but published until 1888, under the title Primeras notas), Rimas (1887) and Abrojos (1887). In the first of these works his readings of Spanish classics is patent, as is the stamp of Victor Hugo. The metric is classic and the tone is predominantly romantic.

In Abrojos, published in Chile, the most acknowledged influence is that from the Spaniard Ramón de Campoamor. Rimas, also published in Chile in the same year, was written for a contest to imitate the Bécquer's Rimas, hence, it is not strange that the intimate tone adopted in this book is very similar to the one present in the writings of the Sevillian poet. It consists of only fourteen poems, of amorous tone, whose expressive means are characteristically bécquerian.

Azul... (1888) has as many tales in prose as poems, which caught the critics' attention through their metric variety. It presents us some of the preoccupations characteristic of Darío, such as his expression of dissatisfaction towards the bourgeoisie. (Note: See, for example, the tale "El rey burgués") A new edition of the text was published in 1890, this one was augmented with several new texts, amongst which were sonnets in Alexandrine verses. Modernism's stage of plenitude and of the Darian poetry is marked by the book Prosas profanas y otros poemas, a collection of poems in which the presence of the erotic is more important, and which contains some esoteric themes (such as in the poem "Coloquio de los centauros"). In this book, we can also find Darío's own eclectic imagery. In 1905, he published Cantos de vida y esperanza, which announces a more intimate and reflexive trend in his works, without renouncing to the themes that have become linked to the identity of Modernism. At the same time, civic poetry appears in his work, with poems like "A Roosevelt", a trend that would be accentuated in El canto errante (1907) and in Canto a la Argentina y otros poemas (1914).

== Legacy ==
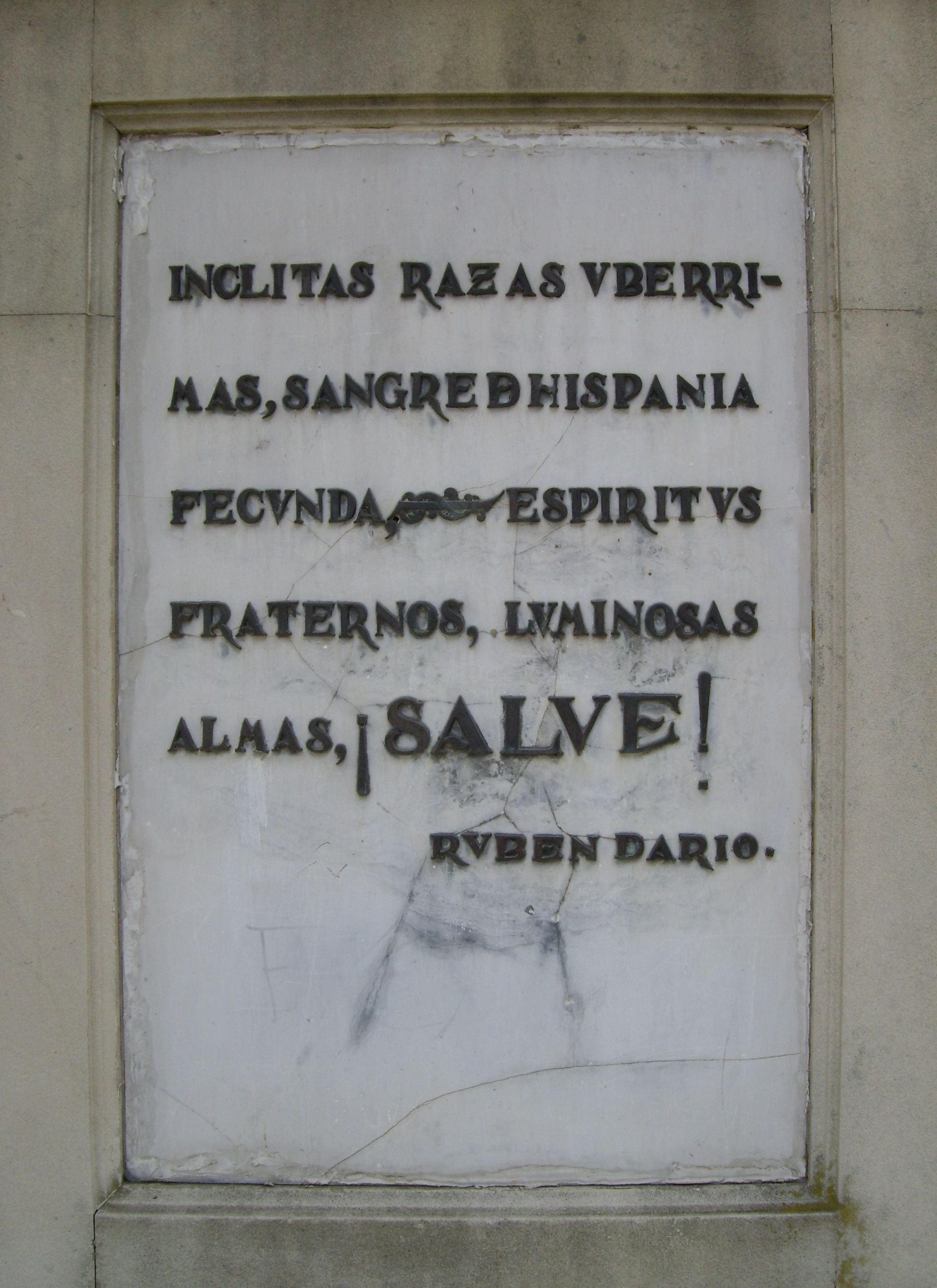
The Monumento a la Raza in Seville features a fragment of a poem written by Darío

- Rubén Darío appears as a character in the 1920 novel Bohemian Lights of Ramón María del Valle-Inclán.
- In honor of the centenary of Darío's birth in 1867, the government of Nicaragua struck a 50 cordoba gold medal and issued a set of postage stamps. The commemorative set consists of eight airmail stamps (20 centavos depicted) and two souvenir sheets.
- There is a Rubén Darío street and a Rubén Darío museum, and his face appears on statues, paintings, and lottery tickets in his homeland of Nicaragua. The National Library of Nicaragua Rubén Darío was renamed in his honour.
- There is a Rubén Darío Plaza and a Rubén Darío metro station in Madrid, Spain.
- The Spanglish novel Yo-Yo Boing! (1998) by Giannina Braschi features an argument about Rubén Darío's genius versus that of other Spanish language poets Quevedo, Góngora, Pablo Neruda, and Federico García Lorca.
- There is a Rubén Darío train station in the General Urquiza Railway in Buenos Aires, Argentina.
- There is a Ruben Dario avenue in the eastern side of Cochabamba, Bolivia going from north to south right under the big Cristo de la Concordia.

== Sources ==
- Acereda, Alberto and Rigoberto Guevara. "Modernism, Rubén Darío, and the Poetics of Despair".
- Orringer, Nelson R. (2002). "Introduction to Hispanic Modernisms", Bulletin of Spanish Studies LXXIX: 133–148.
- Ramos, Julio (2001). Divergent Modernities: Culture and Politics in Nineteenth-Century Latin America trans. John D. Blanco, Duke University Press, Durham, NC, ISBN 0822319810
- Mapes, Edwin K. (1925). L'influence française dans l'oeuvre of Rubén Darío Paris, republished in 1966 by Comisión Nacional para la Celebración del Centenario del Nacimiento de Rubén Darío, Managua, Nicaragua OCLC 54179225
- Rivera-Rodas, Oscar (1989). "El discurso modernista y la dialéctica del erotismo y la castidad" Revista Iberoamericana 146–147: 45–62
- Rivera-Rodas, Oscar (2000). "'La crisis referencial' y la modernidad hispanoamericana" Hispania 83(4): 779–90
- Schulman, Iván A. (1969). "Reflexiones en torno a la definición del modernismo" In Schulman, Iván A. and Gonzalez, Manuel Pedro (1969) OCLC 304168 Martí, Darío y el modernismo Editorial Gredos, Madrid
- Crow, John A. (1992). The Epic of Latin America. London: University of California Press
- Skidmore, Thomas E. & Smith, Peter H. (2005). Modern Latin America. New York: Oxford University Press
