= Bohemian Lights =

1924 play by Ramón del Valle-Inclán

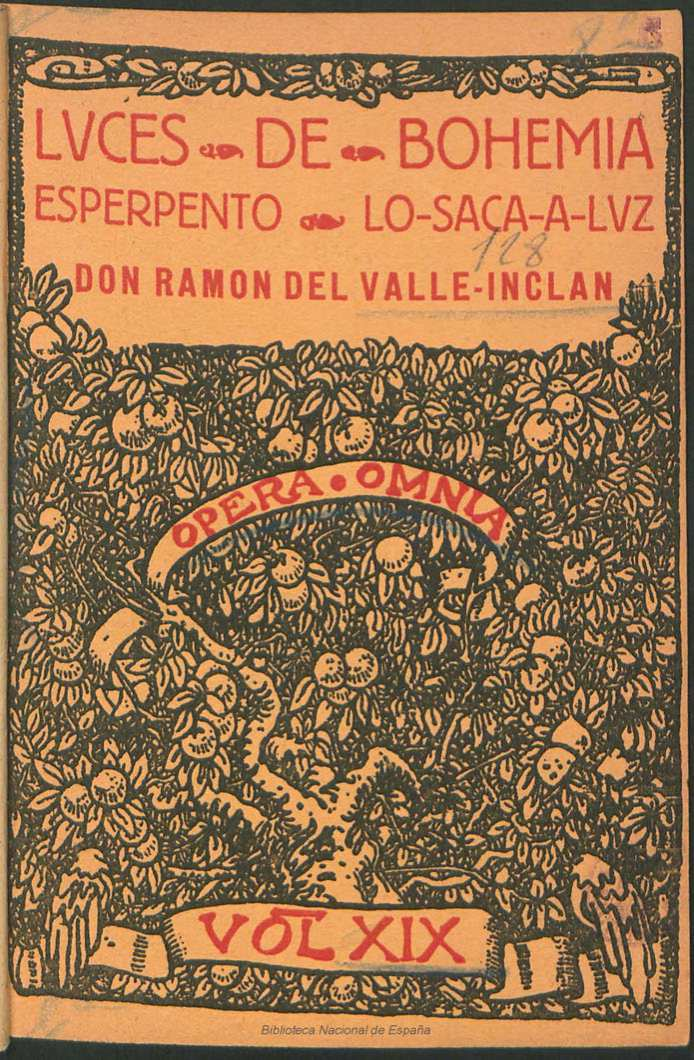
- 1924 edition
- Original language: Spanish
- Written by: Ramón del Valle-Inclán
- Genre: Drama

Bohemian Lights, or Luces de Bohemia in the original Spanish, is a play written by Ramón del Valle-Inclán, published in 1924. The central character is Max Estrella, a struggling poet afflicted by blindness due to developing syphilis. The play is a degenerated tragedy (esperpento) focusing on the troubles of the literary and artistic world in Spain under the Restoration. Through Max's poverty, ill fortune and eventual death, Valle-Inclán portrays how society neglects the creative.

== Analysis of the play ==
Bohemian Lights is the first esperpento by Ramón del Valle-Inclán. The play tells the tragic story of the blind poet Max Estrella as he wanders the streets of early twentieth-century Bohemian Madrid on the last night of his life. Esperpentos depict the world as tragicomedy and the actors as puppets helpless to their fates. The audience is asked to consider what is authentic and what is spectacle. Bohemian Lights is equal parts Realism and Expressionism.

Based on the playwright's experiences in Old Madrid, Bohemian Lights is described as an esperpento within an esperpento and is written in episodic format. In the introduction to the Edinburgh Bilingual Library edition of Luces de Bohemia, Anthony N. Zahareas describes the action as "…a modern, nocturnal odyssey about the frustration, death, and burial of a blind poet, Max Estrella that follows the Classic sense of tragedy of the human condition. Max's struggles highlight the general disregard for artists and the social typology in Spain during that time period.

Valle-Inclán portrays both the Romani (Bohemians) and the members of the Establishment from a historical standpoint, neither praising nor condemning either group. Valle-Inclán juxtaposes the fictional life of Max Estrella and his family with historic events, such as the violent strikes of 1917 and the political arrests of 1919. Through this, Valle-Inclán makes a political statement about many of the controversial issues, both Spanish and international, of his time period: anarchism, revolution, law-of escape (ley de fugas), Lenin, Russia, the war, strikes, syndicates, and the press.

Bohemian Lights was initially serialized and published in a magazine, like many of Valle-Inclán's works. Due to censorship by the Spanish government, Bohemian Lights was not produced in Valle-Inclán's lifetime. It was first published in its entirety in 1920. A second version was published in 1924, with three additional scenes that added to the political statement of the piece: Scene 2, the discussion of Spanish realities versus absurdities in Zarathustra’s bookstore; Scene 6, the shooting of the Catalan prisoner; and Scene 11, the street gathering with the screaming mother.

== Production history ==
Date	Translation	Director	Location	Company	Notes
March–April 1963	"Lumières de Bohème" by Jeannine Worms	Georges Wilson	Théâtre du Palais Chaillot, Paris, France	Théâtre National Populaire	Premiere
1968	"Bohemian Lights"	Unknown	Edinburgh Festival Fringe	Oxford Theatre Group	English language premier; avant-garde
1 October 1970	"Luces de Bohemia"	José Tamayo	Teatro Principal de Valencia, Valencia, Spain	Unknown	Spanish premiere
1971	"Luces de Bohemia"	José Tamayo	Teatro Bella Artes, Madrid, Spain	Lope de Vega Theatre Company	N/A
Oct. 1984	"Luces de Bohemia"	Lluís Pascal	Teatro María Guerrero, Madrid, Spain	Unknown	German Expressionism
23 March 1992	"Bohemian Lights" by Maria Delgado	Lluís Pascal	ICA, London, England	The European Stage Company	Workshop
1993	"Bohemian Lights" by David Johnston	Unknown	The Gate Theatre, London, England	Unknown	Set in 1915 Dublin; won the 1994 London Weekend New Plays on Stage Award
2013–2014	"Bohemian Lights",	Tyler Mercer	New York City	Live Source Theatre Group	Experimental combination of film and live theatre; set in 1974 Madrid at the end of Francisco Franco's dictatorship
2018-2019	"Two Black Lights and One Red" by Billy Burns	Victor Morales	NYC/Sundance Film Festival's New Frontier program		Free adaptation incorporated with Victor Morales' digital art project "Esperpento"

== Character List ==
- Max Estrella – a suicidal blind Bohemian poet and modern artist (the character is inspired in the real-life Alejandro Sawa)
- Madame Collet – Max's French wife
- Claudinita – Max's daughter
- Don Latino de Hispalis – Max's agent
- Zarathustra – a bookseller
- Don [Pilgrim] Gay – a wanderer who has made a career of writing about his travels
- A dimwitted urchin
- The concierge's little girl
- Lizard-Chopper – a tavern owner
- The bar boy
- Henrietta Tread-well – a streetwalker
- The King of Portugal
- The Modernists – Dorio de Gadex, Rafael de los Vélez, Lucio Vero, Mínguez, Gálvez, Clarinito, and Pérez
- Pitito – captain of municipal cavalry
- A night watchman
- The voice of a neighbor
- Two officers of the law
- Serafin-the-dandy
- A bailiff
- A prisoner
- Newspaper office porter
- Don Philbert – Editor-in-Chief
- The Minister of the Interior
- Dieguito Garcia – secretary to the Minister
- A ministry usher
- An old hag and Beauty Spot
- An unknown youth
- The mother of the dead child
- The pawnbroker
- The policeman
- The concierge
- A mason
- An old woman
- The rag-woman
- The retired officer
- People of the district
- Another concierge
- Cuca – a neighbor
- Basilio Soulinake (based on real-life Ernesto Bark)
- A hearse coachman
- Two gravediggers
- Rubén Darío
- The Marquis of Bradomín
- Fan-Fan – a fop
- Pacona – an old news vendor
- Crowds
- Police
- Dogs
- Cats
- A parrot

== Synopsis ==
The play is one act with fifteen scenes. At rise, it is dusk and the blind poet Max Estrella is sitting on the garret with his wife, Madame Collet. Max suggests that he, his wife, and their daughter, Claudinita, all commit collective suicide by burning coal until they asphyxiate. Don Latino comes and informs Max that he has only been able to sell three books. Max and Latino embark on a journey into the streets of Madrid, against the protests of Claudinita and Madame Collet. Scene Two takes place in Zarathustra's bookstore. Max and Latino ask to break the deal with Zarathustra, who declines. Don Gay enters the store and regales the others with tales from his travels.

In Scene Three, Max and Latino enter Lizard-Chopper's tavern. The prostitute Henrietta Tread-well enters and sells lottery tickets to the men in the tavern. Immediately following, Max and Latino stumble drunkenly into the streets, where they meet up with a chorus of Modernists. They create a ruckus and policemen and night-watchmen are called. Max is arrested and taken to the police station, where he is put into a holding room with Serafin-the-Dandy. Max befriends a thirty-year-old Catalan revolutionary when he is taken into a prison cell.

Scene Seven takes place in the Editorial Offices of the People's Gazette. Latino speaks to Don Philbert about getting Max's writings published. Philbert tells Latino to urge Max not to drink so much.

In Scene Eight, Max goes to the office of the Secretary of the Interior. Max meets Latino again and they go to the Café Columbus. Max, Latino, and the café owner Rubén discuss mathematical theories. Max and Latino leave the café, along with Ill-Starred, and walk in the park where they meet Old Hag and Beauty Spot.

The next stop on Max's journey is Austrian Madrid, where they witness the shooting of the Catalan prisoner from Scene Two. The prisoner's death affects Max greatly and is the final straw in his decision to end his life.

In Scene Twelve, Latino and Max sit philosophizing on the steps of a doorway. Max laments that nothing is real and life is grotesque, especially in Spain, which he calls a "deformation of European civilization". Max informs Latino that he is going to commit suicide. Latino does not believe him and repeatedly asks him to stop the "macabre joke". Latino leaves Max and begins to head home when he is stopped by a concierge and is informed that the poet Max Estrella has died.

Latino goes to Max's home to tell Madame Collet and Claudinita of Max's death. Both are grief-stricken. Basilio tries to convince the others that Max is not actually dead and performs an "anti-scientific experiment" with a match to prove his point. The experiment fails and all are forced to accept Max's death.

Scene Fourteen opens with two gravediggers joking about the poet's death. Rubén and the Marquis of Bradomín note the parallels to Shakespeare's Hamlet and discuss life and philosophy.

The final scene of the play takes place once again in Lizard-Chopper's tavern. Latino is drinking with a fop, Fan-Fan. Tread-well enters and announces the winning lottery number. Max had purchased the winning number, meaning that Latino would receive the money. He promises to provide for the others in the tavern. A newsvendor enters with copies of the Herald. The front-page story is about the mysterious death of two women on Bastardillos Street by asphyxiation. Latino speculates that it is Max's wife and daughter, and that they have committed suicide over their loss. The play ends with Latino, Lizard-Chopper, and a drunken patron commenting on how strange and nightmarish the world is.

== Sources ==
Del Valle-Inclán, Ramón. Luces De Bohemia. Trans. Anthony N. Zahareas and Gerald Gillespie. Austin: U of Texas, 1976. Print. Edinburgh Bilingual Library. ISBN 0-292-74609-1
