= Modernismo =

19th and 20th century Spanish literary movement

Modernismo is a literary movement that took place primarily during the end of the nineteenth and early 20th century in the Spanish-speaking world, best exemplified by Rubén Darío, who is known as the father of modernismo. The term modernismo specifically refers to the literary movement that took place primarily in poetry. This literary movement began in 1888 after the publication of Rubén Darío's Azul.... It gave modernismo a new meaning. The movement died out around 1920, four years after the death of Rubén Darío. In Aspects of Spanish-American Literature, Arturo Torres-Ríoseco writes (1963),

Modernismo influences the meaning behind words and the impact of poetry on culture. Modernismo, in its simplest form, is finding the beauty and advances within the language and rhythm of literary works.

Other notable exponents are Leopoldo Lugones, Manuel Gutiérrez Nájera, José Asunción Silva, Julio Herrera y Reissig, Julián del Casal, Manuel González Prada, Aurora Cáceres, Delmira Agustini, Manuel Díaz Rodríguez and José Martí. It is a recapitulation and blending of three European currents: Romanticism, Symbolism and especially Parnassianism. Inner passions, visions, harmonies and rhythms are expressed in a rich, highly stylized verbal music. This movement was of great influence in the whole Hispanic world (including the Philippines), finding a temporary vogue also among the Generation of '98 in Spain, which posited various reactions to its perceived aestheticism.

== Characteristics of modernismo ==
Modernismo is a distinct literary movement that can be identified through its characteristics. The main characteristics of modernismo are:

1. Giving an idea of the culture and time that we live within, cultural maturity.
2. Pride in nationality (pride in Latin American identity)
3. Search for a deeper understanding of beauty and art within the rhetoric. Gives ideas of meaning through colors and images related to senses.
4. Contains different metrics and rhythms. Uses medieval verses such as the Alexandrine verses from the Mester de Clerecía.
5. The use of Latin and Greek mythology.
6. The loss of everyday reality to which many of the modernismo poems are located within exotic or distant places.
7. The cultivation of a perfection within poetry.

== Notable authors ==
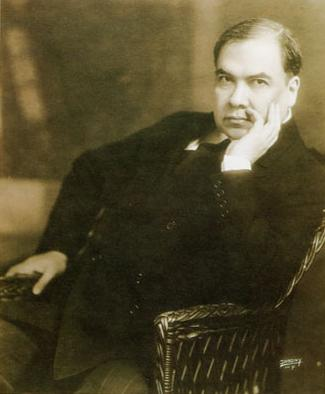
Birthdate: January 18, 1867

=== Rubén Darío ===
Rubén Darío was the father of modernismo and trailblazed the path for future poets. Darío's idea of modernistic poems was rejected by poets following World War I because many considered it outdated and too heavy in rhetoric. He developed the idea of modernism after following Spanish poets and being influenced by them heavily. Darío created a rhythm within his poetry to represent the idea of modernism. This changed the metric of Spanish literature. His use of the French method, Alexandrine verses, changed and enhanced the literary movement. Modernismo literary works also tend to include a vocabulary that many see as lyrical. Modernistic vocabulary drew from many semantic fields to impart a different meaning behind words in his literary work. Examples are items such as flowers, technology, jewelry, diamonds, luxury items, etc. This vocabulary often stemmed from Greek and Latin terms, if not the languages themselves. Darío often mentions the 'swan' in his literary works to symbolize the idea of beauty and perfection within his writing. The idea of beauty and perfection in poetry is a major characteristic of modernismo. In his poem El Cisne, he wrote:

"It happened in a divine moment for the human species.

The swan used to sing only in order to die.

When we heard the accent of the Wagnerian Swan

it was in the midst of a dawn, it was in order to live again."

His contributions to the movement of modernismo created an opportunity for poets to use their words with meaning behind them within their poems. The swan represents perfection, and according to Darío in his poem, the swan was without flaw had the power to revive someone from the dead. This represents the modernismo movement within literary works.

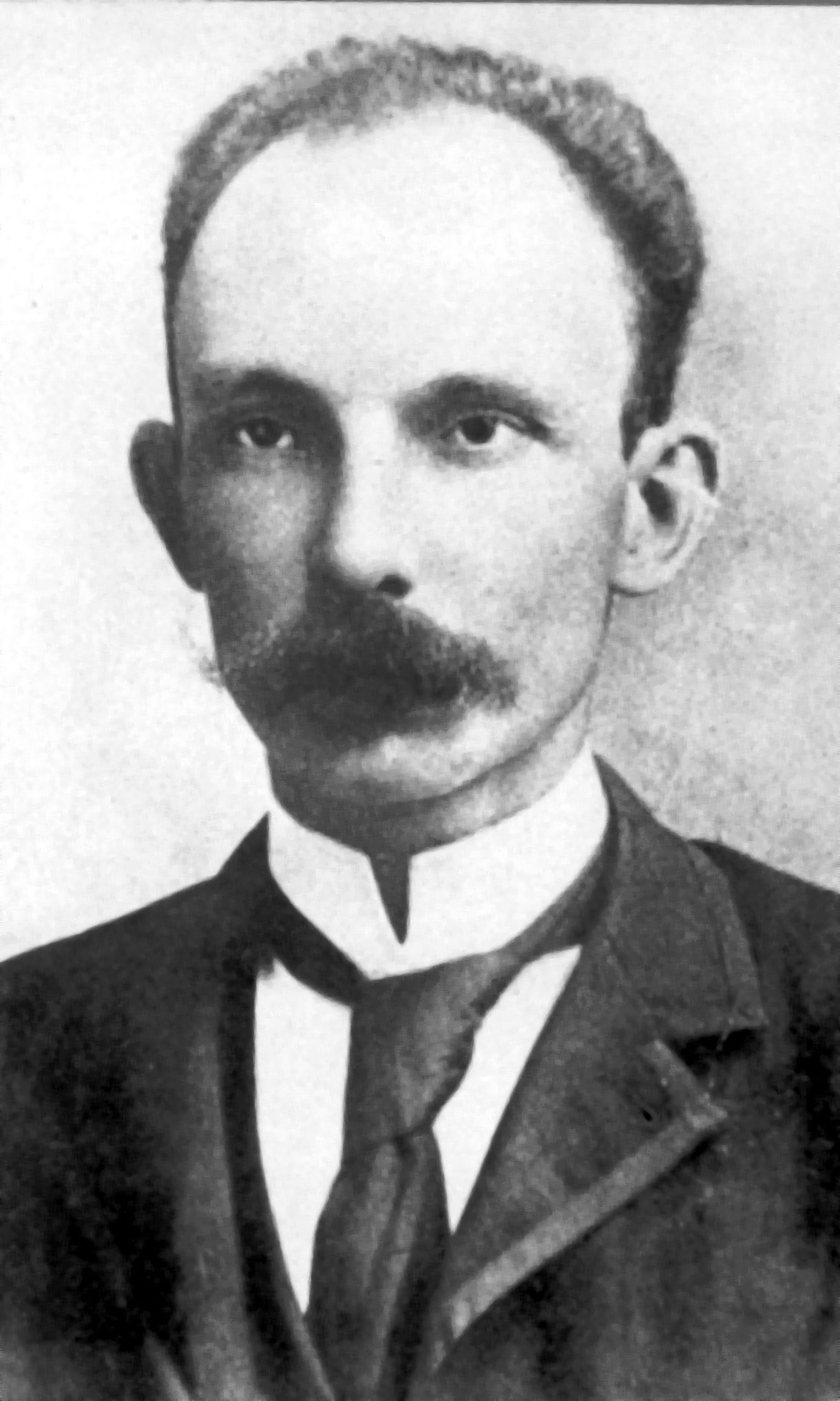

=== José Martí ===
José Julián Martí y Pérez was born on January 28, 1853, in Havana, Cuba—died May 19, 1895. He was a poet, essayist, and a martyr for Cuban independence from Spain. His dedication to a free Cuba made him a symbol of Cuba's struggle for independence from Spain. He organized and unified the movement for Cuban independence and died on the battlefield fighting for it. Martí also used his writing ability to fight for independence. By the age of 15 he had published several poems, and by the age of 16 he founded a newspaper, La Patria Libre. This was his way of showing sympathy for the patriots during a revolutionary uprising in 1868. He was sentenced to six months of hard labor. Martí continued to use his talent to call attention to the problems plaguing Latin America. He is considered one of the fathers of modernismo.

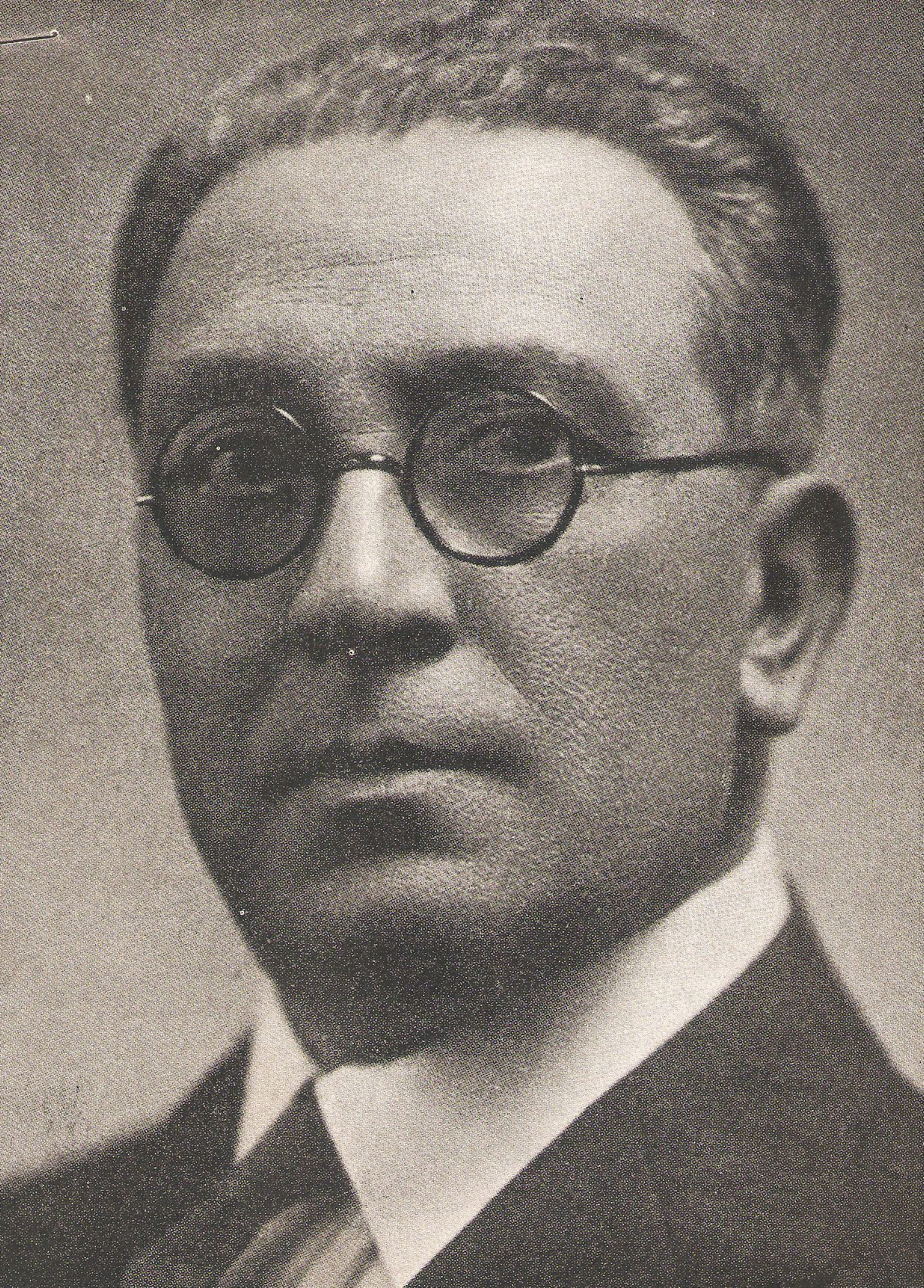

=== Enrique González Martínez ===
Enrique González Martínez was born April 13, 1871, in Guadalajara, Mexico. He died on February 19, 1952, in Mexico City, Mexico. Martínez is considered one of the last great modernismo poets. While others consider him to be the first post-modernismo poet, he never completely abandoned modernismo characteristics in his work. For the first time in Latin American literature, his works showed more of a local concern in literature. He was a medical doctor, professor, and diplomat to Chile (1920-1922), Argentina (1922-24), Spain, and Portugal (1924-1931). One of his poems, called Tuércele el cuello al cisne (Twist the Swan’s Neck), has often been seen as an anti-modernismo manifesto. However, this is far from the truth. Enrique González Martínez continued to be a modernismo poet for the rest of his life.

== See also ==
- Art Nouveau#Modernismo and Modernisme in Spain

== Bibliography ==
- Aching, Gerard. The Politics of Spanish American Modernismo: Discourses of Engagement. Cambridge University Press, 1997.
- Davison, Ned J. The Concept of Modernism in Hispanic Criticism. Boulder: Pruett Press, 1966.
- Glickman, Robert Jay. Fin del siglo: retrato de Hispanoamérica en la época modernista. Toronto: Canadian Academy of the Arts, 1999.
- Mañach, Jorge. Martí: Apostle of Freedom. Translated from Spanish by Coley Taylor, with a preface by Gabriela Mistral. New York, Devin-Adair, 1950.
- Schulmanm, Iván A. and Manuel Pedro Gonzalez. Martí, Darío y el modernismo, Madrid, Editorial Gredos 1969. Martí, Darío and Modernism.
- Torres-Rioseco, Arturo. Aspects of Spanish-American Literature. University of Washington Press, 1963.
- El Modernismo en Cataluña
- Works of Rubén Darío
- Notes on Latin American Modernismo
- El cisne
