= To Roosevelt =

1904 poem by Rubén Darío

"A Roosevelt" (To Roosevelt) is a poem by Nicaraguan poet Rubén Darío. The poem was written by Darío in January 1904 in Málaga, Spain. It is a reaction to the involvement of the United States during the Separation of Panama from Colombia.
