= Josefina Blanco =

Spanish actress

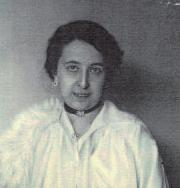
- Born: 1878; León, Spain
- Died: 1957 (aged 78–79); Pontevedra
- Resting place: Cemetery of Santa Mariña de Cambados
- Spouse: Ramón María del Valle Inclán

Josefina Blanco, whose full name is Josefa María Ángela Blanco Tejerina (León, 1878 - Pontevedra, November 19, 1957), was a Spanish actress (active in the periods 1886-1907, 1910-1912, 1918–1936).

== Biography ==
She started in the world of acting when she was almost a child. She met her future husband, the writer Ramón del Valle-Inclán, at the home of the actress María Tubau and her husband Ceferino Palencia. They acted together in the casts of Jacinto Benavente's La comida de las fieras, in November 1898, and Daudet's Los reyes en el destierro, staged by Alejandro Sawa and performed at Teatro de la Comedia in January 1899. Josefina's career was strengthened with plays such as Alma y vida (1902) by Benito Pérez Galdós, at Teatro Español, with Emilio Thuillier, La pecadora (1903), by Ángel Guimerá and El marqués de Bradomín, Coloquios románticos (1906), by her future husband, with the company of Francisco García Ortega and Matilde Moreno.

Her marriage to Valle-Inclán, on August 24, 1907, was celebrated in the Madrid church of San Sebastián, and the subsequent birth of her eldest daughter María de la Concepción (1908), meant a break in her professional career. However, she recovered her activity in 1910, joining the company of María Guerrero and Fernando Díaz de Mendoza, with whom she premiered El rey trovador (1911) and En Flandes se ha puesto el sol (1912) (both written by Eduardo Marquina) and Cuento de abril (1910), Voces de gesta (1912) and La marquesa Rosalinda (1912), (all three written by her husband). She retired from the stage that same year, 1912, when her family moved to Galicia.

She did not return to the stage until 1918, with the play Santa Juana de Castilla, by Benito Pérez Galdós, at Teatro de la Princesa, with Margarita Xirgu. After beginning her divorce proceedings in 1932, she worked at Teatro de la Comedia until the beginning of the Spanish Civil War. After the war she dedicated herself to publishing activities, managing the legacy of her husband, whom she survived for more than 20 years.

== Bibliography ==
- DEL VALLE-INCLÁN ALSINA, Javier. "Apuntes para una biografía de Josefina Blanco" (Notes for a biography of Josefina Blanco). In: Galegos = Gallegos, 2009, n. 5, pp. 161–166. ISSN 1889-2590.
- RUBIO JIMÉNEZ, Jesús & DEAÑO GAMALLO, Antonio Ángel. Ramón del Valle-Inclán and Josefina Blanco. The pedestal of dreams. Zaragoza: Prensas Universitarias de Zaragoza, 2011. ISBN 978-84-15274-28-5.
