= Esperpento =

Spanish literary style

Esperpento denotes a literary style in Spanish literature first established by Spanish author Ramón María del Valle-Inclán that uses distorted descriptions of reality in order to criticize society. Leading themes include death, the grotesque, and the reduction of human beings to objects (reification). The style is marked by bitter irony. In Latin America, the author most well known for using esperpento is Mexican author Jorge Ibargüengoitia.

== Definitions ==
According to the definition given by the most current edition of Diccionario de la Lengua Española (Dictionary of the Spanish Language) by the Royal Spanish Academy (DRAE), (Note: The Royal Spanish Academy is the final authority of the Spanish language in Spain.) esperpento is:

1. A grotesque or unwise act
2. A literary genre created by Ramón del Valle-Inclán, a Spanish writer from the Generation of 1898, in which reality is deformed to overemphasize the grotesque and colloquial or harsh language is subjected to personal elaborations.
3. (colloquial) Person or thing notable for their ugliness, disarray, or rough appearance.

The Royal Spanish Academy first defined the term esperpento in the fourteenth edition of the DRAE (1914), where the first and third meanings above were accepted. Reference to the second sense first appeared in the supplement to the nineteenth edition (1970):

Literary genre created by Ramón del Valle-Inclán. It systematically deforms reality, emphasizing its grotesque and absurd traits, while at the same time degrading consecrated literary values. For this purpose, colloquial language is dignified for artistic purposes to allow cynical expressions and jargon. (Note: Untranslated: "Género literario creado por Ramón del Valle-Inclán. En el que se deforma sistemáticamente la realidad, recargando sus rasgos grotescos y absurdos, a la vez que se degradan los valores literarios consagrados; para ello se dignifica artísticamente un lenguaje coloquial y desgarrado, en el que abundan expresiones cínicas y jergales")

This definition was maintained until the last edition, in which the reference to "consecrated literary values" was removed.

== Esperpento in works by Valle-Inclán ==
=== Metaphor of deformed mirrors ===
Esperpento first made its appearance as an authentic dramatic genre in the 1920 play Luces de Bohemia by Valle-Inclán. The conceptual metaphors in this theater genre were inspired by real locales; for example, the callejón del Gato (Gato Alley) in the play was inspired by the ironmongers' market in calle de Álvarez Gato (Álvarez Gato Street) in Madrid. (Note: Gato in these cases refers to the poet Juan Álvarez Gato.) The real street's most distinguishing feature was the advertising front, where a concave and a convex mirror hung, distorting the image of all those who passed by. (Note: The ironmongers' market was in the zone neighboring Puerta del Sol (Gate of the Sun). When it closed in 1933, the two mirrors were bought by the distillery warehouse nearby that, after the Spanish Civil War, turned into a bar named "Vinícola Aurora Barranco", later renamed "Las Bravas". In May 1998, in one of the various cases of vandalism in Madrid caused by sports celebrations, one of the mirrors was broken. From then on, only reproductions were hung on the wall, while the real mirrors, now restored, were kept inside the building. Afterwards, some writers and humorists played with the word esperpento, relating it to the broken mirrors (espejos) and the self-important soccer fans who broke them.) The mirrors were used by Valle-Inclán as a metaphor in his plays and narratives.

=== Esperpento according to Valle-Inclán ===
Luces de Bohemia, specifically the conversation between Max Estrella and Don Latino de Hispalis in the twelfth scene, is considered to be the foundation of esperpento. Max declares:

The classical heroes reflected in concave mirrors give rise to the esperpento. The tragic sense of Spanish life can only be understood by an esthetic which is systematically deformed...The most beautiful images in a concave mirror are absurd...Deformation stops being such when it is subjected to perfect math. My actual esthetic is to transform the classical norms using the mathematics of the concave mirror. (Note: Untranslated: "Los héroes clásicos reflejados en los espejos cóncavos dan el Esperpento. El sentido trágico de la vida española sólo puede darse con una estética sistemáticamente deformada...Las imágenes más bellas en un espejo cóncavo son absurdas...La deformación deja de serlo cuando está sujeta a una matemática perfecta. Mi estética actual es transformar con matemática de espejo cóncavo las normas clásicas.")

The idea of esperpento is based on Valle-Inclán's perception of the mixture between the great and the grotesque, which he considered typical of Spanish society. He employed this method of portraying reality in all his works from then on, including in Martes de Carnaval (Carnival Tuesday), La hija del capitán (The Captain's Daughter), Las galas del difunto (The Galas of the Deceased), and Los cuernos de don Friolera (The Horns of Don Friolera).

According to Valle-Inclán, "There are three ways of seeing the world artistically or esthetically: on one's knees, standing up, or levitating in the air." In the first method, "You give the characters, the heroes, a higher status...at least when compared to the narrator." The second method is to view them "as though they were our own selves", and the third is "to look at the world from a superior plane and consider the characters in the plot to be inferior to the author, with a point of irony. The gods become farces. It is a manner very Spanish, a demiurge manner, that doesn't believe to be in any way made of the same earth as its dolls."

Valle-Inclán refers to esperpento, as he sees it, as having precedence in the literature of Francisco de Quevedo and the paintings of Francisco de Goya. According to Valle-Inclán:

This consideration is what moved me to change my writing and write esperpentos, the literary genre that I baptize with the name esperpentos. The world of the esperpentic—as one of the characters in Bohemian Lights explains—is as though the ancient heroes have become deformed in the concave mirrors of the street, with a grotesque transportation, but rigorously geometric. And these deformed beings are the heroes called to represent a classic fable that is not deformed. The ones who play the tragedy are minute and bow-legged. And with this sense, I've carried them to Tirano Banderas and to El ruedo ibérico (The Iberian Bullring). (Note: Untranslated: "Y esta consideración es la que me movió a dar una cambio en mi literatura y a escribir los «esperpentos», el genero literario que yo bautizo con el nombre de «esperpentos». El mundo de los «esperpentos»—explica uno de los personajes de Luces de Bohemia—es como si los héroes antiguos se hubiesen deformado en los espejos cóncavos de la calle, con un transporte grotesco, pero rigurosamente geométrico. Y estos seres deformados son los héroes llamados a representar una fábula clásica no deformada. Son enanos y patizambos que juegan una tragedia. Y con este sentido los he llevado a Tirano Banderas y a El ruedo ibérico.")

=== Characteristics ===
The main characteristic of esperpento is usage of the grotesque as a form of expression, which includes reification of characters, fusion of animal and human forms, legitimizing colloquial language via its use in literature, an abundant use of contrast, distorting scenery, and mixing the real world with nightmares. The systematic deformation of reality plays a key role, often calling on the appearance of caricatures. Death appears as a fundamental character. Esperpento comes with a semitransparent moral lesson, filled with criticism and satire.

The degradation present in esperpento affects both environments and characters. The dominant settings are taverns and brothels, miserable interiors, and dangerous streets in Madrid. Characters on the street include drunkards, prostitutes, rogues, beggars, failed artists, and bohemians, all presented as marionettes incapable of voluntary action.

The main question that esperpento asks is whether it presents a deformed image of reality or whether it presents an accurate image of a deformed reality.

== Works cited ==
- Álvarez-Nóvoa, Carlos (2000). La noche de Max Estrella: hora a hora; análisis dramatúrgico de "Luces de bohemia" de don Ramón María del Valle-Inclán [The Night of Max Estrella: Hour by Hour; dramatist analysis of Ramón María del Valle Inclán's "Bohemian Lights" (in Spanish) (1st ed.). Barcelona: Octaedro. ISBN 84-8063-442-1.
- Valle-Inclán, Ramón del (1920). Luces de Bohemia. Esperpento, lo saca a la luz de don Ramón del Valle-Inclán [Bohemian Lights: Esperpento, brought to the light by Don Ramón del Valle-Inclán. Madrid: Imprenta Cervantina. ISBN 9788423918010.
- Zamora Vincente, Alonso (1967). Asedio a "Luces de Bohemia" primer esperpento de Ramón del Valle Inclán. Discurso leído el día 28 de mayo de 1967 en su recepción pública, por el Excelentísimo Señor Don Alonso Zamora Vicente y contestación del Excelentísimo Señor Don Rafael Lapesa [Siege on "Bohemian Lights", Ramón del Valle Inclán's first esperpento work: discourse read on May 28, 1967 at his public reception by his Excellency Señor Don Alonso Zamora Vincente and answer from his Excellency Señor Don Rafael Lapesa]. Madrid: Real Academia Española.
- Zamora Vincente, Alonso (1969). La realidad esperpéntica. Aproximación a "Luces de bohemia" [The esperpentic reality: Approach to "Bohemian Lights"]. Madrid: Editorial Gredos.
