= Azul... =

1888 poetry collection by Rubén Darío

Azul
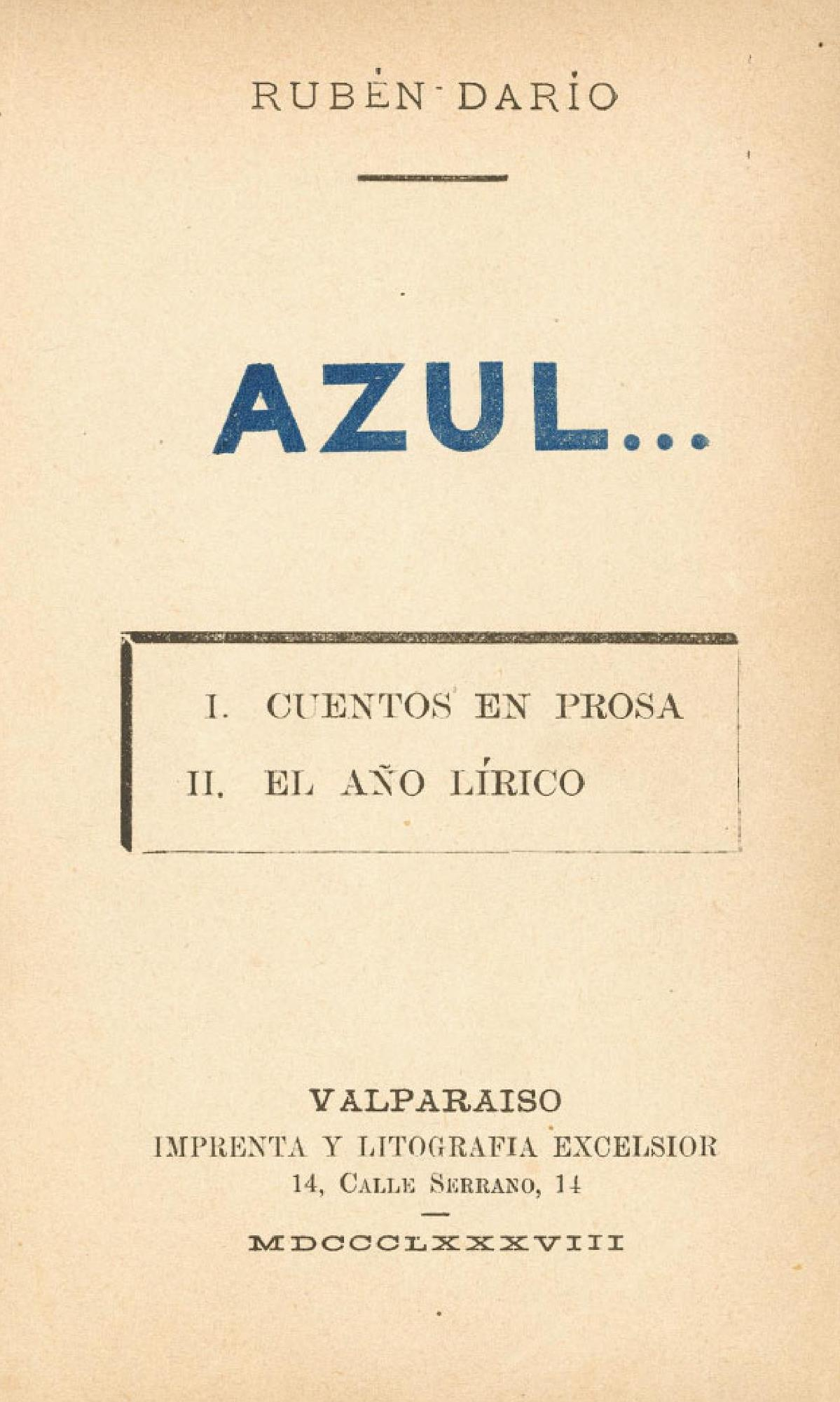
- The cover of Azul's first edition
- Author: Rubén Darío
- Publication date: 1888

Azul is a collection of short stories and poetry by Nicaraguan poet Rubén Darío. It was published in 1888 as Darío's first major work and a major work of the Modernismo literary movement. He is commonly considered the initiator of literary modernism, a thesis that has been supported by personalities such as Octavio Paz, Ángel Rama or Darío himself. However, the works Ismaelillo (1882) by Martí and Cuentos Fragiles (1883) by Gutiérrez Nájera are viewed as precursors of this movement.

== Content and reception ==
Precocious and prolific, from the age of 14 he signed the name Rubén Darío to his poems and stories of love, heroism, and adventure, which, although imitative in form, showed a strikingly vivid imagination. In 1886 he left Nicaragua, beginning the travels that continued throughout his life. He settled for a time in Chile, where in 1888 he published his first major work, Azul (“Blue”), a collection of short stories, descriptive sketches, and verse. This volume was soon recognized in Europe and Latin America as the herald of a new era in Spanish American literature. Darío had only recently become acquainted with French Parnassian poetry, and Azul represents his attempt to apply to Spanish the tenets of that stylistic movement. In the prose works in Azul he discarded the traditional long and grammatically complex Spanish sentence structure, replacing it with simple and direct language. Both the prose and poetry in this volume are generally concerned with objective description, and both deal with exotic subjects, chiefly classical mythology, France, and Asia. As a whole, the volume exhibits Darío’s concern with “art for art's sake,” and it reveals little interest in everyday life.

— The Editors of Encyclopaedia Britannica, Rubén Darío, Encyclopædia Britannica
