= Alejandro Sawa =

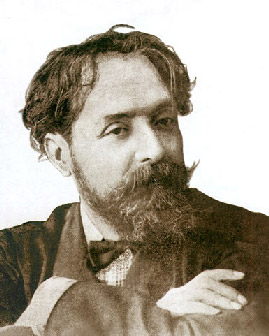
Alejandro Sawa in Madrid, circa 1896.

Alejandro Sawa Martínez (15 March 1862 – 3 March 1909) was a Spanish bohemian novelist, poet, and journalist.

Born in Seville, Sawa was of Greek origin. His father was an importer of wine and sundries. After a brief flirtation with the priesthood and a stint at the seminary of Málaga, he underwent a sudden conversion to vehement anticlericalism and thereafter studied law in Granada. He arrived in Madrid in 1885, "absurd, brilliant, and starving" (Valle-Inclán, Bohemian Lights). There he led an impoverished, marginal existence.

My early days in Madrid were stupendously vulgar - why not say it? - and noble as well. On the same winter day that Pi y Margall anointed me with his reverend right hand, ordaining me into the intellectual hierarchy, I had to sleep in a stairwell on account of having found no place cozier than that in which to take shelter. I know many things about the land called Poverty. But I'm not a complete foreigner to the star-studded infinities that lie beyond.

In 1889, he was lured to Paris by its artistic scene. For a time he worked on the staff of the Garnier publishing house, editing an encyclopedic dictionary, and had ample opportunity to strike up friendships with many of the luminaries of Parnassian and Symbolist literature, though he himself preferred the Romanticism of Victor Hugo. He translated the works of the Goncourt brothers and enjoyed what he would later regard as his "golden years". He married a Burgundian, Jeanne Poirier, and fathered a girl, Elena.

On his return to Madrid in 1896 he plunged headfirst into journalism, serving as editor of El Motín, El Globo, and La Correspondencia de España, and as a contributor to ABC, Madrid Cómico, España, and Alma Española, among others. His last years were marked by his descent into blindness and mental illness. Ironically, it was this period that yielded his only artistic success, a stage adaptation of Alphonse Daudet's Kings in Exile, in the winter of 1899. His own writings, which were largely journalistic, continued to appear in the most prestigious Spanish newspapers even as his body and mind progressively deteriorated. He wrote, "I wouldn't have wanted to be born, but I find it unbearable to die." He did so on 3 March 1909, blind and insane, in his modest house on calle Conde Duque de Madrid. Shortly before his death, the great bohemian had declared:

Death, death! Now it's all I dream about. Dying and going to wherever villainy isn't the prevailing custom, where affirmations and negations at least carry the philosophical sense that lexicons assign to them, where honor starts at the soul instead of the lips. Dying, getting out of here, for dignity's sake, for art's sake, for the sake of self-preservation! I still feel like the healthy one in the middle of this leper colony!

Sawa's personality was an inspiration to the novelists of the Generation of '98, notably Pío Baroja in The Tree of Knowledge and Valle-Inclán in Bohemian Lights. Max Estrella, the protagonist of the latter, was largely inspired by Sawa, who, though outwardly uncultivated, possessed a forceful personality and a style redolent of Hugo and Verlaine, men whom he would claim as his personal friends, along with Alphonse Daudet, Rubén Darío, and Manuel Machado. (The latter would compose an epicede in his honor.) After Sawa's death, Valle-Inclán wrote to Rubén Darío:

I've mourned for him, for me, for all the poor poets. I can't do anything, neither can you, but if enough of us were to join together we could do something. Alejandro left a book unedited. The best he's ever written. A journal of hopes and woes. The failure of every attempt he made to get it published, and a letter from El Liberal rescinding an assignment worth seventy pesetas, were what drove him mad in his final days. A desperate madness. He was on the verge of killing himself. He died like a king in a tragedy: mad, blind, and furious.

— Ramón María del Valle-Inclán.

Posthumously published in 1910 with a prologue by Rubén Darío, Iluminaciones en la sombra marked a modernist departure from the naturalist style in which he had written his earlier novels: La mujer de todo el mundo (1885), Crimen legal (1886), Declaración de un vencido (1887), Noche (1889), Criadero de curas (1888), and La sima de Igusquiza (1888).
