= Ramón del Valle-Inclán =

Spanish dramatist and novelist

Valle-Inclán
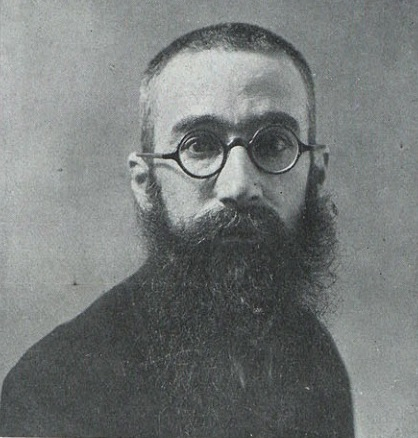
- Valle-Inclán, photographed by Pau Audouard in 1911
- Born: Ramón María del Valle-Inclán; 28 October 1866; Vilanova de Arousa, Pontevedra, Kingdom of Spain
- Died: 5 January 1936 (aged 69); Santiago de Compostela, Second Spanish Republic
- Occupations: Dramatist and novelist
- Spouse: Josefa María Ángela Blanco Tejerina
- Children: 6: María de la Concepción (1908); Joaquín María Baltasar (1914-1914); Carlos Luis Baltasar (1917-2006); María de la Encarnación Beatriz Baltasar Mariquiña (1919-2003); Jaime Baltasar Clemente (1922-1985); Ana María Antonia Baltasar (1924)
- Writing career
- Language: Spanish
- Genres: Theater; Novel; Poetry
- Movements: Generation of 98; Decadent movement

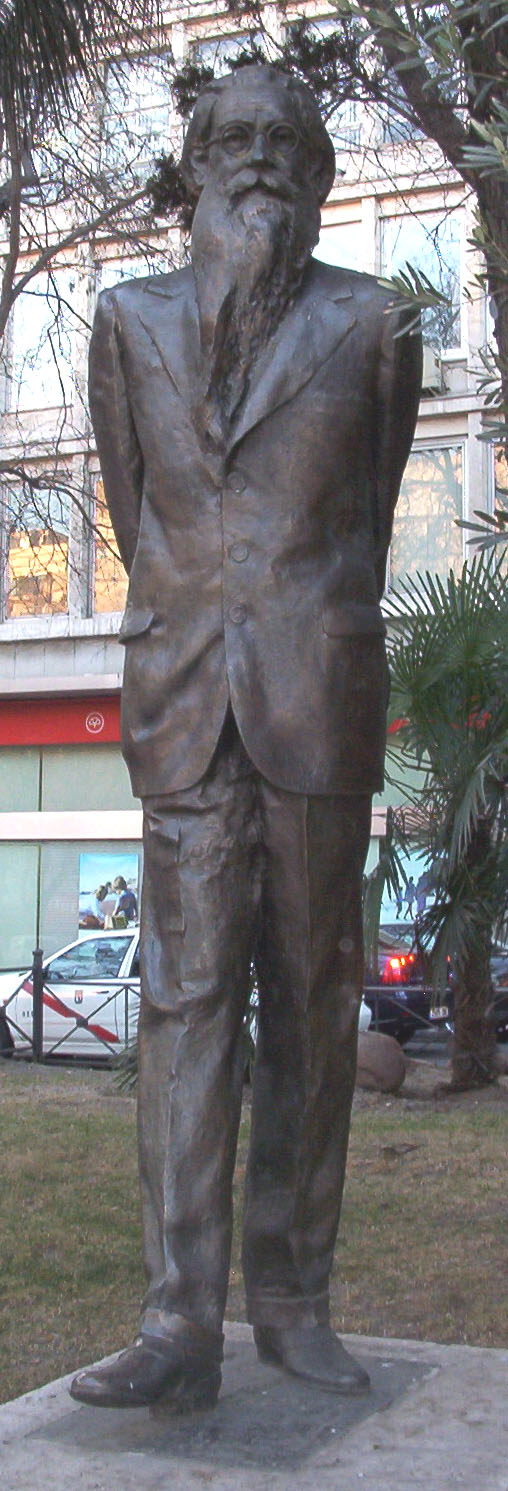
Statue on the Paseo de Recoletos in Madrid, by Francisco Toledo Sánchez (1972)

Ramón María del Valle-Inclán y de la Peña (born in Vilanova de Arousa, Galicia, Spain, on October 28, 1866, and died in Santiago de Compostela on January 5, 1936) was a Spanish dramatist, novelist, and member of the Spanish Generation of 98. His work has been described by literary critics as radical in its subversion of traditional Spanish theatre in the early 20th century. He influenced later generations of Spanish dramatists and is honored on National Theatre Day with a statue in Madrid.

== Biography ==
Ramón María del Valle-Inclán was the second son of Ramón Valle-Inclán Bermúdez and Dolores de la Peña y Montenegro. As a child he lived in Vilanova and A Pobra do Caramiñal, and then he moved to Pontevedra in order to study high school. In 1888 he started to study law at University of Santiago de Compostela, and there he published his first story, Babel, at the Café con gotas magazine. He left his studies and moved to Madrid in 1890, where he wrote for various periodical newspapers such as El Globo, La Ilustración Ibérica or El Heraldo de Madrid.

He traveled to Mexico in 1892 to write for El Universal, El Correo Español and El Veracruza, before the following year returning to Pontevedra to write his first book, Femeninas (Feminine), published in 1895.

In 1895, he moved to Madrid again, working as an official at the Ministry of Public Instruction and Fine Arts. In Madrid he did some translations of José Maria de Eça de Queirós, Alexandre Dumas, Gabriele D'Annunzio, Jules Barbey d'Aurevilly, Paul Alexis and Matilde Serao. In spite of his economic difficulties, he started to have a name in the tertulias (literary gatherings) of many culturally significant coffeehouses in Madrid, such as Café Gijón, and to be noticed for his dandy attitude and his eccentric looks. His hot temper got him involved in various affrays. Because one of those, at Café de la Montaña in 1899, an unfortunate stick wound by writer Manuel Bueno caused one of his cufflinks to inlay in his arm. The wound produced gangrene, and Valle-Inclán had his arm amputated. That same year of 1899, he met Rubén Darío, and both of them became good friends. At that time, he published his first theater play, Cenizas (Ashes), and he started a very prolific literary period.

In 1907 he married the actress Josefina Blanco.

In 1910 he traveled for six months to various Latin American countries (Argentina, Chile, Paraguay, Uruguay and Bolivia) escorting his wife on an acting tour.

In 1913 he returned to Galicia, and set his residence in Cambados. Then, after the death of his second son, he moved to A Pobra do Caramiñal.

In 1916 he published in the Cuban magazine Labor Gallega a poem in Galician language with the title of Cantiga de vellas (Son of old women), which is his most valuable contribution to Galician literature.

During World War I, he supported the allied army, visiting the front in various occasions as a war correspondent for El Imparcial.

In 1921 he traveled to Mexico again, invited by the President of the Republic, Álvaro Obregón. There he participated in many literary and cultural events, and got conquered by the Mexican Revolution. On his way back to Spain, he spent two weeks in Havana, and two weeks in New York City. That same year, 1921, he was appointed President of the International Federation of Latin American Intellectuals.

He returned to Spain at the end of 1921, and there he started to write Tirano Banderas (Tyrant Banderas). He went back to Madrid in 1922, still inflamed by the spirit of the Mexican Revolution.

Since 1924 he showed his opposition to Miguel Primo de Rivera's dictatorship.

With the arrival of the Second Spanish Republic, he ran in the elections with the Partido Radical of Alejandro Lerroux, but he did not get a seat.

In 1932, Josefina Blanco filed for divorce. The same year, he was appointed Director of the Museum of Aranjuez and President of the Ateneo of Madrid. Also, the government of the Second Spanish Republic appointed him Curator of the National Artistic Heritage, but his confrontations with the Ministry because of the bad state of the palaces and museums under his direction forced his resigning. In 1933 he was the director of the Spanish Academy of Fine Arts in Rome, Italy.

He died in Santiago de Compostela, Galicia, Spain, on January 5, 1936.

== Works ==
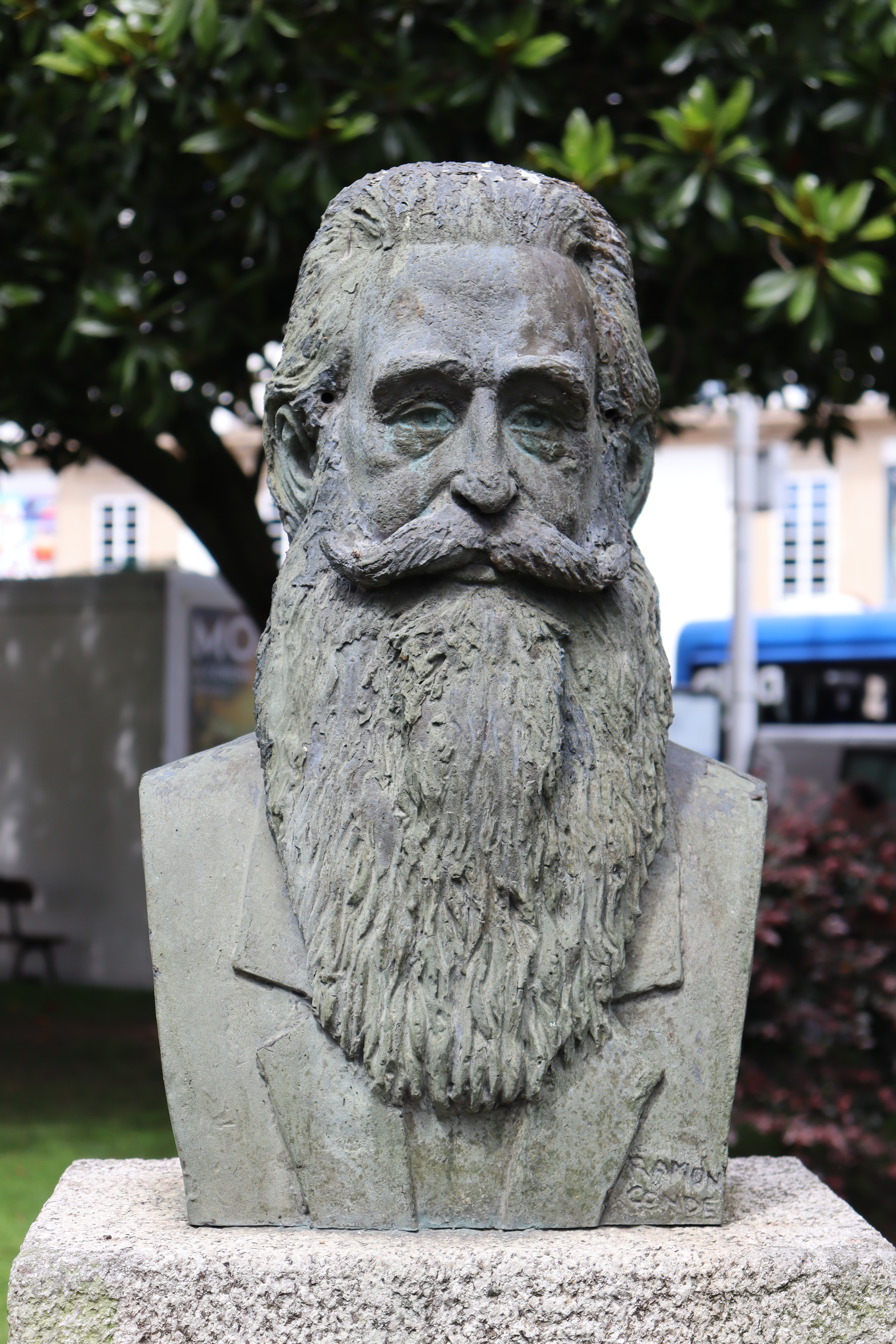
Bust of Valle-Inclán in La Coruña, Galicia (Spain).

His early writings were in line with French symbolism and modernism; however, his later evolution took his works to more radical formal experiments. He despised literary realism and openly disregarded Benito Pérez Galdós, its most prominent Spanish representative. His political views, accordingly, changed from traditional absolutism (in Spain known as Carlismo) towards anarchism. This also caused him problems.

All his life he struggled to live up to his Bohemian ideals, and stayed loyal to his aestheticist beliefs. However, he had to write undercover for serialised popular novels.

Works by Valle-Inclán such as Divine Words (Divinas palabras) and Bohemian Lights (Luces de Bohemia) attack what he saw as the hypocrisy, moralising and sentimentality of the bourgeois playwrights, satirise the views of the ruling classes and target particular concepts such as masculine honour, militarism, patriotism and servile attitudes toward the Crown and the Roman Catholic Church. His dramas also featured irreverent portrayals of figures from Spain's political past and deployed crude, obscene language and vulgar imagery in a mocking attack on theatrical blandness.

In addition to being politically subversive, though, Valle-Inclán's plays often required staging and direction that went far beyond the abilities of many companies working in the commercial theatre, often featuring complex supernatural special effects and rapid, drastic changes of scene. For this reason, some of his works are regarded as closet dramas.

Valle-Inclán also wrote major novels including the Tyrant Banderas (Tirano Banderas), which was influential on the Latin American 'dictator' novel (for example, I, the Supreme by Augusto Roa Bastos), although it was received with disdain by many Latin American authors. Rufino Blanco Fombona, for example, pokes fun of "the America of tambourine" ("la América de pandereta") of that novel where you could be in the jungle one day and the Andes the next. Some critics view him as being the Spanish equivalent to James Joyce; however, due to a lack of translations his work is still largely unknown in the English-speaking world, although his reputation is slowly growing as translations are produced.

Diego Martínez Torrón has studied and published El ruedo ibérico, the first annotated edition of this work, a lot of unpublished manuscripts of this work.

=== Plays ===
- Cenizas. Drama en tres actos (1899)
- El marqués de Bradomín. Coloquios románticos (1907)
- Águila de blasón. Comedia bárbara (1907)
- Romance de lobos. Comedia bárbara (1908)
- El yermo de las almas (1908)
- Farsa infantil de la cabeza del dragón (1909)
- Cuento de abril. Escenas rimadas en una manera extravagante (1910)
- Farsa y licencia de la Reina Castiza (1910)
- Voces de gesta. Tragedia pastoril (1911)
- El embrujado. Tragedia de tierras de Salnés (1913).
- La marquesa Rosalinda. Farsa sentimental y grotesca (1913)
- Divine Words-Divinas palabras. Tragicomedia de aldea (1919)
- Farsa italiana de la enamorada del rey (1920)
- Farsa y licencia de la Reina Castiza (2nd edition, 1920)
- Bohemian Lights-Luces de bohemia. Esperpento (1920) (12 scenes)
- Silver Face Cara de Plata. Comedia bárbara (1922)
- ¿Para cuándo son las reclamaciones diplomáticas? (1922)
- Bohemian Lights-Luces de bohemia. Esperpento (2nd edition, enhanced, 1924) (15 scenes)
- La rosa de papel. Novela macabra (1924)
- La cabeza del Bautista. Novela macabra (1924)
- Los cuernos de don Friolera. Esperpento (1925)
- Tablado de marionetas para educación de príncipes (1926). Contains: Farsa y licencia de la Reina Castiza, Farsa italiana de la enamorada del rey, Farsa infantil de la cabeza del dragón
- El terno del difunto (1926) (renamed as Las galas del difunto in 1930)
- Ligazón. Auto para siluetas (1926)
- La hija del capitán. Esperpento (1927)
- Sacrilegio. Auto para siluetas (1927)
- Retablo de la avaricia, la lujuria y la muerte (1927). Contains: Ligazón. Auto para siluetas, La rosa de papel, La cabeza del Bautista, El embrujado, Sacrilegio. Auto para siluetas
- Martes de Carnaval. Esperpentos (1930). Contains: Las galas del difunto (El terno del difunto), Los cuernos de don Friolera. Esperpento, La hija del capitán. Esperpento

=== Prose ===
- The Pleasant Memoirs of the Marquis de Bradomín – Sonatas: Memorias del Marqués de Bradomín
  - Spring and Summer Sonatas – Sonata de primavera y Sonata de estío (1904 and 1903)
  - Autumn and Winter Sonatas – Sonata de otoño y Sonata de invierno (1902 and 1905)
- Flor de santidad (1904)
- La pipa de kif (lyric poem) (1919)
- Tyrant Banderas – Tirano Banderas (1926)
- Mr Punch the Cuckold
- The Lamp of Marvels

== Adaptations ==
=== Film ===
- 1948: L'Amore (second episode based on Flor de santidad)
- 1959: Sonatas (based on Sonatas: Memorias del Marqués de Bradomín)
- 1973: Flor de santidad
- 1976: Beatriz (based on Beatriz y Mi hermana Antonia)
- 1977: Divinas palabras
- 1985: Luces de bohemia
- 1987: Divinas palabras
- 1993: Banderas, the Tyrant

== See also ==
- Café Gijón (Madrid)
- Esperpento
- Plaza de las Cinco Calles
