= La Raza (disambiguation) =

La Raza are the people of the Hispanic and Chicano world.

La Raza may also refer to:

== Arts and entertainment ==
- La Raza (newspaper), a Chicano newspaper based in Los Angeles
- La Raza (Chicago), a Spanish-language newspaper in Chicago published by ImpreMedia
- La Raza (album), an album by Armored Saint
- "La Raza" (song), a song by Kid Frost
- "La Raza Cósmica", an essay by José Vasconcelos
- KLAX-FM, a Spanish-language radio station in Los Angeles and San Francisco, California, branded as "La Raza"
- KGHD-LD, an FM radio station in Las Vegas, Nevada, formerly branded as "La Raza"
- WTSH-FM and WLKQ-FM, two simulcast radio stations in Georgia, United States, branded as La Raza
- "La Raza", a filmmaking style by Zachary Laoutides

== Political and community organizations ==
- Católicos por La Raza, a Chicano-Catholic organization
- El Centro de la Raza, a community center in Seattle
- Centro Cultural de la Raza, a cultural center in San Diego, California
- Galería de la Raza, a San Francisco Bay Area art gallery
- National Council of La Raza, a political advocacy group
- La Raza Nation, a Chicago-based gang
- La Raza National Lawyers Association, a legal organization
- Raza Unida Party, a Chicano nationalist party

== Transportation ==
- La Raza metro station, in Mexico City
- La Raza (Mexibús), a BRT station in Mexico City
- La Raza (Mexico City Metrobús, Line 1), a BRT station in Mexico City
- La Raza (Mexico City Metrobús, Line 3), a BRT station in Mexico City

== Other uses ==
- Día de la Raza or Columbus Day, the anniversary of Columbus' arrival in the Americas
- Los Siete de la Raza, a group of seven youths accused of killing a police officer in San Francisco, California in 1969

== See also ==
- Raza (disambiguation)
- Monterrey La Raza (disambiguation)
- Monumento a la Raza (disambiguation)
