= American race =

American race may refer to:

- In racial anthropology, the native peoples of the (sub-Arctic) Americas considered as one of the major races of mankind, see Amerindian race
- The American Race, 1891 book by Daniel Garrison Brinton
- In early 20th-century racial ideology of Spain and Latin America, an amalgamated "Iberoamerican race", see La Raza § History

== See also ==
- Native peoples of the Americas
- Ancestral Native American
- Peopling of the Americas
- Historical race concepts
- Red race
- Johann Friedrich Blumenbach
- La Raza Cósmica (1925)
- Race and ethnicity in the United States
- Race and ethnicity in Latin America
