= Hispanic American Studies =

Hispanic American Studies may refer to:

- Chicana/o studies
- Latin American Studies
- La Raza and La Raza Studies (disambiguation)
