= Razam =

Razam (Belarusian: Разам; lit. 'Together') may refer to:

- Razam (Belarusian political party)
- Belarusian community RAZAM

== See also ==
- Rajam, Andhra Pradesh, a town in India
- Rasam (disambiguation)
- Raza (disambiguation)
