= Monumento a la Raza =

Monumento a la Raza may refer to:

- Monumento a la Raza (Medellín), a 1988 concrete monument in Medellín, Colombia
- Monumento a la Raza (Mexico City), a 1940 concrete monument in Cuauhtémoc, Mexico City
- Monumento a la Raza (Neiva), a 1978 concrete-and steel monument in Neiva, Colombia, destroyed in 2021
- Monumento a la Raza (Seville), a 1929 marble monument in Seville, Spain
- Monumento a la Raza, a monument in Zona Río, Tijuana, Mexico
- Monumento a la Raza Indígena, a monument in Tunja, Colombia
