= Monumento a la Raza (Neiva) =

Monument in Neiva, Colombia

- The monument before its relocation
- Final location
- Location: Neiva, Colombia
- Coordinates: 2°56′33.3″N 75°18′09.7″W
- Designer: Carlos Rojas Niño
- Material: Concrete and steel
- Opening date: 24 May 1978
- Dedicated date: Foundation of Neiva
- Dedicated to: La Raza and Mestizaje
- Dismantled date: 18 May 2021 (42 years, 11 months, 3 weeks and 3 days)

The Monumento a la Raza y al Mestizaje (lit. 'Monument to the Race and to Mestizo-ship'), simply known as the Monumento a la Raza, was a concrete-and-steel outdoor sculpture and monument in the city of Neiva, Huila, Colombia. It featured a Spanish conquistador, an indigenous woman, and their mixed-race infant, all of whom were partially naked.

Olmo Guillermo Liévano, the city's mayor, unveiled it on a roundabout at the South Colombian University on 24 May 1978, to commemorate the 366th year of the city's founding. It was a sculpture by Colombian artist Carlos Rojas Niño.

The monument was moved in May 2018 to make room for renovations to the El Tizón Bridge road junction. The sculpture was scheduled to receive restoration as well. Demonstrators toppled it on 18 May 2021, citing decolonization and feminist arguments. Rojas Niño said that the monument depicted the cynicism of the conquistadors during the colonization of the Americas.

== Description ==
The Monumento a la Raza featured three partly-naked people, a Spanish conquistador who raised his left fist in the air and embraced an indigenous woman, who held their mestizo child.

According to a writer from Pitalito Noticias, it described José Eustasio Rivera's "cultural syncretism pointing to the immensity of the land of promise". Ramiro Charry Durán, advisor to the office of the governor of Huila, described it as a monument that "symbolize[d] the union of the Spanish and indigenous races; it is the embrace of the conqueror and colonizer with the fertile, hard-working, indomitable and warrior indigenous woman who exhibits the fruit of the union".

After its destruction, Rojas explained that the sculpture depicted the cynicism of the conquistadors and criticized and satirized the la Raza expression, an ideology related to the process of racial intermixing between the colonizers and the indigenous populations which resulted in the union of both cultures, caricaturing Spanish hypocrisy on the colonization period. At the same time, Rojas questioned the demolition of the monument sociologically, as demonstrators did not complain about their Spanish roots and traditions, such as bullfighting.

== See also ==
- Indigenismo
