= South Colombian University =

Universidad Surcolombiana
- Universidad Surcolombiana
- Type: Public
- Rector: Ruben Dario Valbuena
- Location: Neiva, Huila, Colombia
- Campus: Urban
- Nickname: USCO
- Website: www.usco.edu.co

The Universidad Surcolombiana (Spanish: Universidad Surcolombiana), also known as USCO, is a public, national, university based primarily in the city of Neiva, Huila, Colombia.

== See also ==
- List of universities in Colombia
- Monumento a la Raza (Neiva)
