= Ethnic groups in Latin America =

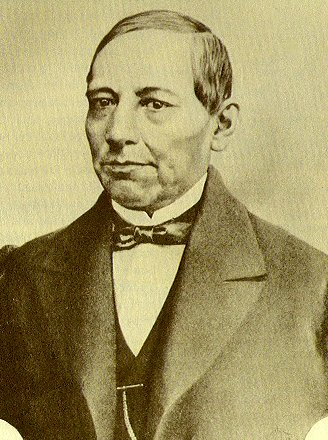
Benito Juárez was an Amerindian Mexican of Zapotec ancestry.

Latin America's population is composed of a diverse mix of ancestries and ethnic groups, including Indigenous peoples, Europeans, Africans, Asians, and those of mixed heritage, making it one of the most ethnically diverse regions globally. The specific composition of the group varies from country to country. Many, including Mexico, Colombia, and some countries in Central America, having predominantly Mestizo identifying populations; in others, such as Bolivia, and Peru, Amerindians are a majority; while some are dominated by inhabitants of European ancestry, for example, Argentina or Uruguay; and some countries, such as Brazil and the Dominican Republic having sizable Mulatto and/or African populations.

== Overview ==
According to Jon Aske:

Before Hispanics became such a 'noticeable' group in the U.S., the distinction between black and white was the major racial division and according to the one-drop rule adhered to by the culture at large, one drop of African ancestry usually meant that the person was Black. ...

The notion of racial continuum and a separation of race (or skin color) and ethnicity, on the other hand, is the norm in most of Latin America. In the Spanish and Portuguese empires, racial mixing or miscegenation was the norm and something that the Spanish and Portuguese had grown rather accustomed to during the hundreds of years of contact with Arabs and North Africans in the Iberian peninsula. But, demographics may have made this inevitable as well. Thus, for example, of the approximately 13.5 million people who lived in the Spanish colonies in 1800 before independence only about one fifth were white. This contrasts with the U.S., where more than four fifths were whites (out of a population of 5.3 million in 1801, 900,000 were slaves, plus approximately 60,000 free blacks). ...

The fact of the recognition of a racial continuum in Hispanic American (sic) does not mean that there wasn't discrimination, which there was, or that there wasn't an obsession with race, or 'castes', as they were sometimes called. ...

In areas with large indigenous Amerindian populations, a racial mixture resulted, which is known in Spanish as mestizos ... who are a majority in Mexico, Central America and most of South America. Similarly, when African slaves were brought to the Caribbean region and Brazil, where there was very little indigenous presence left, unions between them and Spanish produced a population of mixed mulatos ... who are a majority of the population in many of those Spanish-speaking Caribbean basin countries (Cuba, Dominican Republic, Puerto Rico, Colombia, and Venezuela).

Aske has also written that:

Spanish colonization was rather different from later English, or British, colonization of North America. They had different systems of colonization and different methods of subjugation. While the English were primarily interested in grabbing land, the Spanish in addition had a mandate to incorporate the land's inhabitants into their society, something which was achieved by religious conversion and sexual unions which produced a new 'race' of mestizos, a mixture of Europeans and indigenous peoples. mestizos (sic) form the majority of the population in Mexico, Central America, and much of South America. Racial mixing or miscegenation, after all, was something that the Spanish and Portuguese had been accustomed to during the hundreds of years of contact with Arabs and North Africans. Similarly, later on, when African slaves were introduced into the Caribbean basin region, unions between them and Spaniards produced a population of mulatos, who are a majority of the population in the Caribbean islands (the Antilles) (Cuba, Dominican Republic, Puerto Rico), as well as other areas of the Caribbean region (Colombia, Venezuela and parts of the Central American Caribbean coast). mestizos (sic) and mulatos may not have always have been first class citizens in their countries, but they were never disowned in the way the outcomes of unions of Europeans and Native Americans were in the British colonies, where interracial marriages were taboo and one drop of Black or Amerindian blood was enough to make the person 'impure'.

In his famous 1963 book The Rise of the West, William Hardy McNeill wrote that:

Racially mixed societies arose in most of Spanish and Portuguese America, compounded in varying proportions from European, Indian, and Negro strands. Fairly frequent resort to manumission mitigated the hardships of slavery in those areas; and the Catholic church positively encouraged marriages between white immigrants and Indian women as a remedy for sexual immorality. However, in the southern English colonies and in most of the Caribbean islands, the importation of Negro slaves created a much more sharply polarized biracial society. Strong race feeling and the servile status of nearly all Negroes interdicted intermarriage, practically if not legally. Such discrimination did not prevent interbreeding; but children of mixed parentage were assigned to the status of their mothers. Mulattoes and Indian half-breeds were thereby excluded from the white community. In Spanish (and, with some differences, Portuguese) territories a more elaborate and less oppressive principle of racial discrimination established itself. The handful of persons who had been born in the homelands claimed topmost social prestige; next came those of purely European descent; while beneath ranged the various racial blends to form a social pyramid whose numerous racial distinctions meant that no one barrier could become as ugly and inpenetrable as that dividing whites from Negroes in the English, Dutch, and French colonies.

Thomas C. Wright, meanwhile, has written that:

The demographic makeup of colonial Latin America became more complex when, as the native population declined, the Portuguese, Spanish, and the French in Haiti turned to Africa for labor, as did the British in North America. The tricontinental heritage that characterizes Latin America, then, is shared by the United States, but even a casual examination reveals that the outcome of the complex interaction of different peoples has varied. While miscegenation among the three races certainly occurred in North America, it appears to have been much less common than in Latin America. Furthermore, offspring of such liaisons were not recognized as belonging to new, distinct racial categories in North America as they were in Latin America. The terms mestizo or mameluco, mulatto, the general term castas, and dozens of subcategories of racial identity frankly recognized the outcomes of interracial sexual activity in Latin America and established a continuum of race rather than the unrealistic absolute categories of white, black, or Indian as used in the United States. (The U.S. Census Bureau's forms did not allow individuals to list more than one race until 2000.)

== Racial and ethnic groups ==
- Mestizos: Intermixing between Europeans and Amerindians began early in the colonial period and was extensive. The resulting people, known as Mestizos (Caboclos in Brazil), make up the majority of the population in half of the countries of Latin America, with Paraguay and Chile being some of the lead countries. Additionally, Mestizos compose large minorities in nearly all the other mainland countries. Some countries in Latin America may use this term loosely as the literal meaning of the word "Mixed race", for example in the Dominican Republic and Honduras where the majority of the populations identify as Mestizo even if they have clear African ancestry.
- Whites: Beginning in the late 15th century, small numbers of Iberian colonists settled in what became Latin America. The Portuguese colonized Brazil primarily, and the Spaniards settled elsewhere in the region. At present, most white Latin Americans are of Spanish, Portuguese and Italian ancestry. Iberians brought the Spanish and Portuguese languages, the Catholic faith, and many Iberian-Latin traditions. Brazil, Mexico, Argentina, Colombia and Venezuela contain the largest absolute numbers of Whites in Latin America. Self-identified populations of whites make up the majorities of Argentina, Chile, Costa Rica, Cuba, and Uruguay and roughly half of Brazil's and Venezuela's populations. Ever since most of Latin America gained independence in the 1810s–1820s, millions of people have immigrated there. Of these immigrants, Italians formed the largest group, and next were Spaniards and Portuguese. Many others arrived, such as Germans, French, British, Greeks, Poles, Ukrainians, Russians, Croats and Irish. Also included are Jews and Armenians, as well as Arabs of Lebanese, Syrian, and Palestinian descent; most of them are Christian. Whites presently are the second most common racial group in Latin America and, whether as White, Mestizo, or Mulatto, the large number of Latin Americans have some degree of white ancestry.
- Amerindians: The indigenous population of Latin America, the Amerindians, arrived during the Lithic stage. In post-Columbian times they experienced tremendous population decrease, particularly in the early decades of colonization. They have since recovered in numbers, surpassing sixty million by some estimates. With the growth of other groups, they now compose a majority only in Bolivia and Guatemala, and nearly a third of Peru's population. Mexico (around one fifth of national population) has the largest Amerindian population in the Americas in absolute numbers. Most of the remaining countries have Amerindian minorities, in every case making up less than one-tenth of the respective country's population. In many countries, people of mixed Amerindian and European ancestry make up the majority of the population.
- Asians: People of Asian descent number several million in Latin America. The first Asians to visit the region were Filipino, as a result of New Spain's trading in Asia and Europe. The majority of Asian Latin Americans are of Japanese or Chinese ancestry and reside mainly in Brazil and Peru; there is also a growing Chinese minority in Panama. Brazil is home to about two million people of Asian descent; this includes the largest ethnic Japanese community outside Japan itself (estimated as high as 1.5 million), and about 200,000 ethnic Chinese and 100,000 ethnic Koreans. Ethnic Koreans also number tens of thousands in Argentina and Mexico.
- Mulattoes: Mulattoes are people of mixed African and European ancestry. In Latin America, Mulattoes descend primarily from Spanish or Portuguese men on one side, and enslaved African women on the other. Brazil is home to Latin America's largest mulatto population. Mulattoes are a population majority in the Dominican Republic and, depending on the source, Cuba as well. Mulattoes are also large in Venezuela, Panama, Honduras, Colombia, Costa Rica and Puerto Rico.
- Blacks: Millions of Africans were brought to Latin America from the 16th century onward, the majority of whom were sent to the Caribbean region and Brazil. Among the Latin American nations, Brazil leads this category in relative and absolute numbers, with 39% of the population being of at least partial Afro-Latin American descent. Significant populations are also found in Dominican Republic, Puerto Rico, Colombia, Cuba, Panama, Ecuador, Peru, Venezuela, Honduras, and Costa Rica. Latin Americans of mixed Black and White ancestry, called Mulattoes, are more numerous than Blacks. However, sometimes mulattos are included in the 'black' category, while other times they form their own ethnicity.
- Zambos: Intermixing between Africans and Amerindians was especially prevalent in Brazil and Middle America, often due to slaves running away (becoming cimarrones: maroons) and being taken in by Amerindian villagers. People of this mixed ancestry are known as Garifunas in Central America, Lobos in Mexico, and Cafuzos in Brazil.

=== Census and other sources ===
This is a list of ethnic groups based on national or other sources.

Country	Native	White	Mestizo	Mulatto	Black	East Asian	Pardo or Mixed	Zambo	Other	Undeclared	Type of study	Year
Argentina	2.83%	0.0%	0.0%	0.0%	0.66%	0.0%	0.0%	0.0%	0.0%	96.51%	Census	2022
Bolivia	41.52%	0.0%	0.0%	0.0%	0.23%	0.0%	0.0%	0.0%	0.0%	58.25%	Census	2012
Brazil	0.60%	43.46%	0.0%	0.0%	10.17%	0.42%	45.34%	0.0%	0.0%	0.0%	Census	2022
Chile	12.44%	0.0%	0.0%	0.0%	0.0%	0.0%	0.0%	0.0%	0.06%	87.50%	Census	2017
Colombia	4.31%	0.0%	0.0%	0.0%	6.76%	0.0%	0.0%	0.0%	0.01%	88.93%	Census	2018
Costa Rica	2.42%	0.0%	0.0%	6.72%	1.05%	0.21%	0.0%	0.0%	87.37%	2.21%	Census	2011
Cuba	0.0%	64.1%	0.0%	0.0%	9.3%	0.0%	26.6%	0.0%	0.0%	0.0%	Census	2012
Dominican Republic	0.0%	13.6%	0.0%	67.6%	18.3%	0.0%	0.0%	0.0%	0.0%	0.0%	Household survey	2006
Ecuador	7.69%	2.21%	77.47%	1.45%	3.36%	0.0%	0.0%	0.0%	7.82%	0.0%	Census	2022
El Salvador	0.2%	12.7%	86.3%	0.0%	0.1%	0.0%	0.0%	0.0%	0.6%	0.0%	Census	2007
Guatemala	43.43%	0.0%	56.01%	0.0%	0.19%	0.0%	0.0%	0.13%	0.24%	0.0%	Census	2018
Honduras	7.24%	7.87%	82.94%	0.0%	1.39%	0.0%	0.0%	0.0%	0.55%	0.0%	Census	2013
Mexico	9.35%	0.0%	0.0%	0.0%	2.04%	0.0%	0.0%	0.0%	0.0%	88.61%	Census	2020
Nicaragua	2.07%	0.0%	0.0%	0.0%	0.0%	0.0%	0.0%	2.79%	3.75%	91.36%	Census	2005
Panama	12.3%	0.0%	0.0%	0.0%	9.2%	0.0%	0.0%	0.0%	0.0%	78.5%	Census	2010
Paraguay	2.29%	0.0%	0.0%	0.0%	0.0%	0.0%	0.0%	0.0%	0.0%	97.71%	Census	2022
Peru	25.75%	5.89%	60.20%	0.0%	3.57%	0.16%	0.0%	0.0%	4.42%	0.0%	Census	2017
Puerto Rico	0.5%	17.1%	0.0%	0.0%	7.0%	0.1%	49.8%	0.0%	32.5%	0.0%	Census	2020
Uruguay	2.4%	87.7%	0.0%	0.0%	4.6%	0.2%	0.0%	0.0%	0.1%	4.9%	Census	2011
Venezuela	0.0%	43.6%	0.0%	0.0%	3.6%	0.0%	51.6%	0.0%	1.2%	0.0%	Census	2011

==== Official census data in graphic form ====
Racial groups in Argentina (2022 census)
1. Undeclared (96.5%)
2. Indigenous (2.83%)
3. Blacks (0.66%)
Racial groups in Bolivia (2012 census)
1. Undeclared (59.2%)
2. Indigenous (40.6%)
3. Blacks (0.23%)
Racial groups in Brazil (2022 census)
1. Pardos (mixed) (45.3%)
2. Whites (43.5%)
3. Blacks (10.2%)
4. Indigenous (0.60%)
5. East Asians (0.42%)
Racial groups in Chile (2024 census)
1. Undeclared (87.7%)
2. Indigenous (11.4%)
3. Blacks (0.94%)
Racial groups in Colombia (2018 census)
1. Undeclared (85.0%)
2. Blacks (9.34%)
3. Indigenous (4.31%)
4. Romanis (0.01%)
5. Not specified (1.35%)
Racial groups in Costa Rica (2011 census)
1. Undeclared (83.6%)
2. Mulattos (6.72%)
3. Indigenous (2.42%)
4. Blacks (1.05%)
5. East Asians (0.21%)
6. Not specified (5.95%)
Racial groups in Cuba (2012 census)
1. Whites (64.1%)
2. Mulattos (26.6%)
3. Blacks (9.26%)
Racial groups in the Dominican Republic (2022 census)
1. Mixed (71.7%)
2. Whites (18.7%)
3. Blacks (7.45%)
4. East Asians (0.33%)
5. Others (1.80%)
Racial groups in Ecuador (2022 census)
1. Mestizos (85.2%)
2. Indigenous (7.69%)
3. Blacks (4.81%)
4. Whites (2.21%)
5. Others (0.12%)
Racial groups in Guatemala (2018 census)
1. Ladinos (56.0%)
2. Indigenous (43.4%)
3. Blacks (0.32%)
4. Others (0.24%)
Racial groups in Honduras (2013 census)
1. Mestizos (82.9%)
2. Whites (7.87%)
3. Indigenous (7.25%)
4. Blacks (1.39%)
5. Others (0.24%)
Racial groups in Mexico (2020 census)
1. Undeclared (78.5%)
2. Indigenous (19.4%)
3. Blacks (2.04%)
Racial groups in Peru (2017 census)
1. Mestizos (60.2%)
2. Indigenous (25.8%)
3. Whites (5.89%)
4. Blacks (3.57%)
5. East Asians (0.16%)
6. Others (4.42%)
Racial groups in Puerto Rico (2020 census)
1. Mixed (49.8%)
2. Whites (17.1%)
3. Blacks (6.96%)
4. Indigenous (0.54%)
5. East Asians (0.12%)
6. Others (25.5%)
Racial groups in Uruguay (2011 census)
1. Whites (87.7%)
2. Blacks (4.60%)
3. Indigenous (2.35%)
4. East Asians (0.23%)
5. Others (5.14%)

=== According to Lizcano ===
The following table contains information based on a 2014 non-genetic work entitled "Composición Étnica de las Tres Áreas Culturales del Continente Americano al Comienzo del Siglo XXI" ("Ethnic Composition of the Three Cultural Areas of the American Continent at the Beginning of the 21st Century") by National Autonomous University of Mexico professor Francisco Lizcano Fernández.

Lizcano compiled his estimation of groups based on criteria of cultural patterns, not on genotypes nor even phenotype. In these estimations, therefore, "whites" encompasses all those whose practiced culture is predominantly Iberian-derived, while "mestizos" encompasses those whose practiced culture noticeably mixes Iberian and Amerindian cultural traditions, and "Amerindians" only those whose practiced culture is predominantly indigenous.

The resulting effect of employing these criteria, therefore, skews the figure of said groups if they had been based on genetic factors, or even based on phenotypic factors. Thus, for instance, the estimate of "whites" given for Chile would include mostly genetic mestizos, while the estimate of "mestizos" in Mexico would include not only a significant proportion of genetic Amerindians, but also many genetic whites, and so on for other countries.

Country	Population 2014	Whites	Mestizos	Mulattoes	Amerindians	Blacks	Asians	Creoles & Garifunas
Argentina	41,769,726	85.0%	12.0%	0.0%	1.0%	0.0%	2.0%	0.0%
Bolivia	10,118,683	15.0%	28.0%	2.0%	55.0%	0.0%	0.0%	0.0%
Brazil	203,429,773	53.8%	0.0%	39.1%	0.4%	6.2%	0.5%	0.0%
Chile	17,300,000	52.7%	39.3%	0.0%	8.0%	0.0%	0.0%	0.0%
Colombia	41,725,543	20.0%	53.2%	21.0%	1.8%	3.9%	0.0%	0.1%
Costa Rica	4,576,562	82.0%	15.0%	0.0%	0.8%	0.0%	0.2%	2.0%
Cuba	11,087,330	37.0%	0.0%	51.0%	0.0%	11.0%	1.0%	0.0%
Dominican Republic	9,956,648	14.6%	0.0%	75.0%	0.0%	7.7%	0.4%	2.3%
Ecuador	16,888,760	9.9%	41.0%	5.0%	39.0%	5.0%	0.1%	0.0%
El Salvador	6,071,774	1.0%	91.0%	0.0%	8.0%	0.0%	0.0%	0.0%
Guatemala	13,824,463	4.0%	42.0%	0.0%	53.0%	0.0%	0.8%	0.2%
Honduras	8,143,564	1.0%	85.6%	1.7%	7.7%	0.0%	0.7%	3.3%
Mexico	121,724,226	15.0%	70.0%	0.5%	14.0%	2.4%	0.5%	0.0%
Nicaragua	5,666,301	14.0%	78.3%	0.0%	6.9%	0.0%	0.2%	0.6%
Panama	3,989,133	10.0%	32.0%	27.0%	8.0%	5.0%	4.0%	14.0%
Paraguay	6,759,058	20.0%	74.5%	3.5%	1.5%	0.0%	0.5%	0.0%
Peru	30,814,175	12.0%	32.0%	9.7%	45.5%	0.0%	0.8%	0.0%
Puerto Rico	3,308,535	74.8%	0.0%	10.0%	0.0%	15.0%	0.2%	0.0%
Uruguay	3,460,462	88.0%	8.0%	4.0%	0.0%	0.0%	0.0%	0.0%
Venezuela	27,635,743	16.9%	37.7%	37.7%	2.7%	2.8%	2.2%	0.0%
Total	579,092,570	36.1%	30.3%	20.3%	9.2%	3.2%	0.7%	0.2%

Note: "Creoles" refer to people of African descent originated in British and French colonies.

=== According to Latinobarometro ===
The following table shows how Latin Americans answer the question What race do you consider yourself to belong to? in the Latinobarometro survey.

Country	Mestizos	Whites	Amerindians	Mulattoes	Blacks	Asians	Other race
Argentina	28%	56%	5%	1%	3%	1%	7%
Bolivia	63%	5%	28%	1%	1%	0%	3%
Brazil	16%	37%	3%	12%	23%	0%	9%
Chile	20%	73%	5%	1%	0%	0%	1%
Colombia	47%	25%	10%	6%	9%	1%	2%
Costa Rica	34%	37%	9%	17%	4%	0%	0%
Dominican Republic	29%	16%	6%	25%	17%	1%	6%
Ecuador	87%	3%	5%	3%	2%	0%	0%
El Salvador	60%	16%	16%	5%	3%	0%	0%
Guatemala	37%	7%	48%	5%	1%	1%	0%
Honduras	49%	19%	10%	17%	8%	0%	1%
Mexico	58%	9%	21%	2%	1%	1%	7%
Nicaragua	63%	15%	10%	4%	4%	0%	0%
Panama	43%	12%	18%	5%	22%	1%	0%
Paraguay	65%	22%	6%	0%	3%	0%	3%
Peru	77%	5%	7%	1%	2%	0%	8%
Uruguay	12%	74%	4%	4%	4%	0%	3%
Venezuela	43%	31%	8%	9%	7%	0%	3%
Total	46%	27%	11%	6%	6%	0%	3%

== Ethnic distribution ==
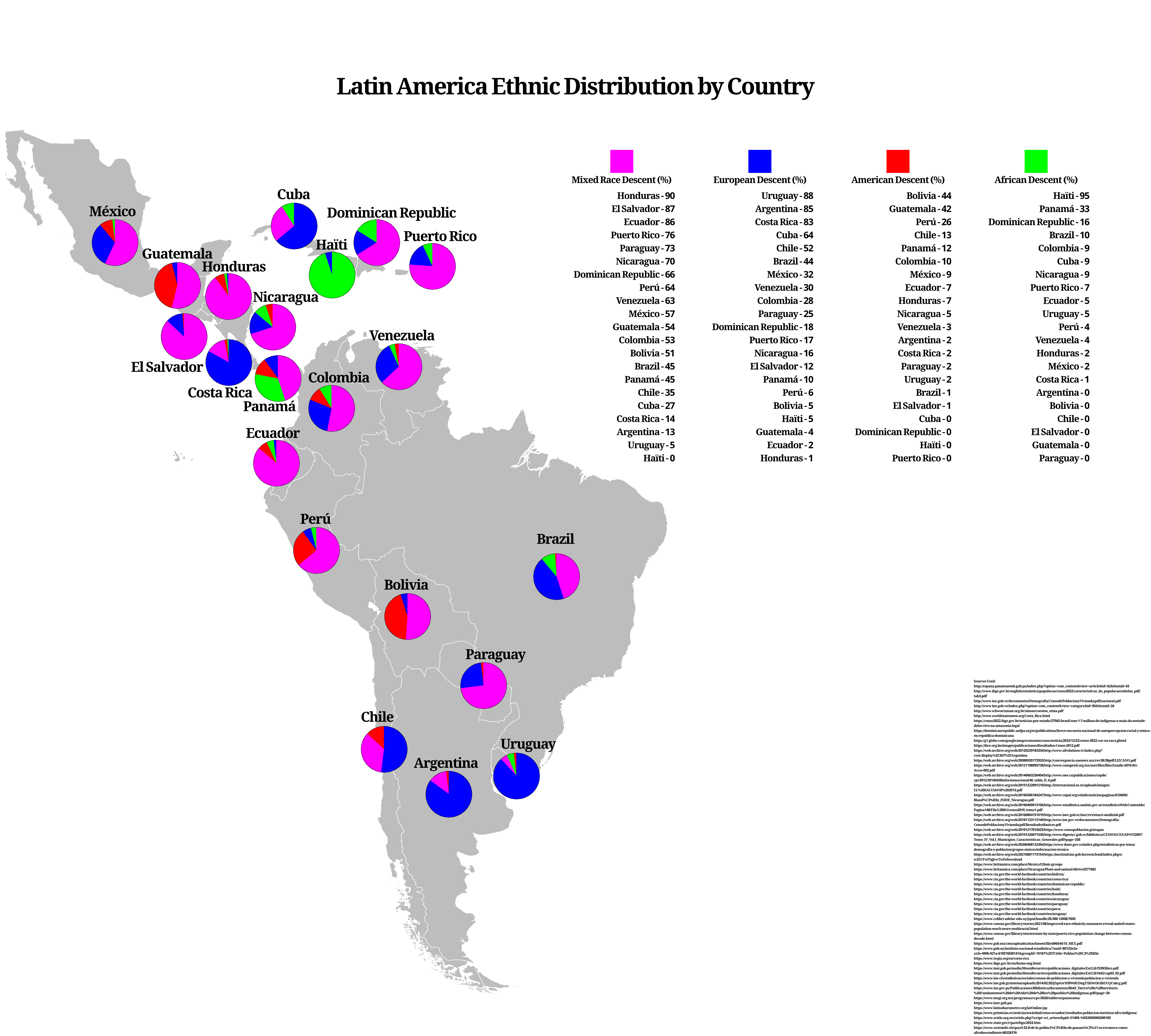
Ethnic distribution by country

=== Indigenous distribution by country ===
Percentage of Self-identified indigenous peoples in relation to the total population of each country
Country or Region	Percent of the Population
Bolivia	44%
Guatemala	42%
Peru	25.8%
Chile	12.8%
Panama	12.5%
Colombia	10.4%
Mexico	9.36%
Ecuador	7%
Honduras	7%
Nicaragua	5%
Venezuela	2.7%
Argentina	2.4%
Costa Rica	2.4%
Uruguay	2.4%
Paraguay	1.8%
Brazil	0.8%
El Salvador	0.2%
Cuba	ND
Puerto Rico	ND
Dominican Republic	ND

=== European distribution by country ===
Percentage of Self-identified Europeans in relation to the total population of each country
Country or Region	Percent of the Population
Uruguay	88%
Argentina	85%
Costa Rica	82.7%
Cuba	64.1%
Chile	52%
Brazil	43.5%
Mexico	32%
Venezuela	30.3%
Colombia	28.5%
Paraguay	25%
Dominican Republic	17.8%
Puerto Rico	17.1%
Nicaragua	15.5%
El Salvador	12.35%
Panama	10%
Peru	5.9%
Bolivia	5%
Guatemala	4%
Ecuador	2.2%
Honduras	1%

=== African distribution by country ===
Percentage of Self-identified Africans in relation to the total population of each country
Country or Region	Percent of the Population
Panama	32.8%
Dominican Republic	15.8%
Brazil	10.2%
Colombia	9.34%
Cuba	9.3%
Nicaragua	9%
Puerto Rico	7%
Ecuador	4.8%
Uruguay	4.6%
Venezuela	3.6%
Peru	3.6%
Mexico	2.04%
Honduras	2%
Costa Rica	1.1%
Argentina	0.37%
Guatemala	0.3%
Bolivia	0.2%
El Salvador	0.13%
Paraguay	0.13%
Chile	0.06%

== Genetic studies ==
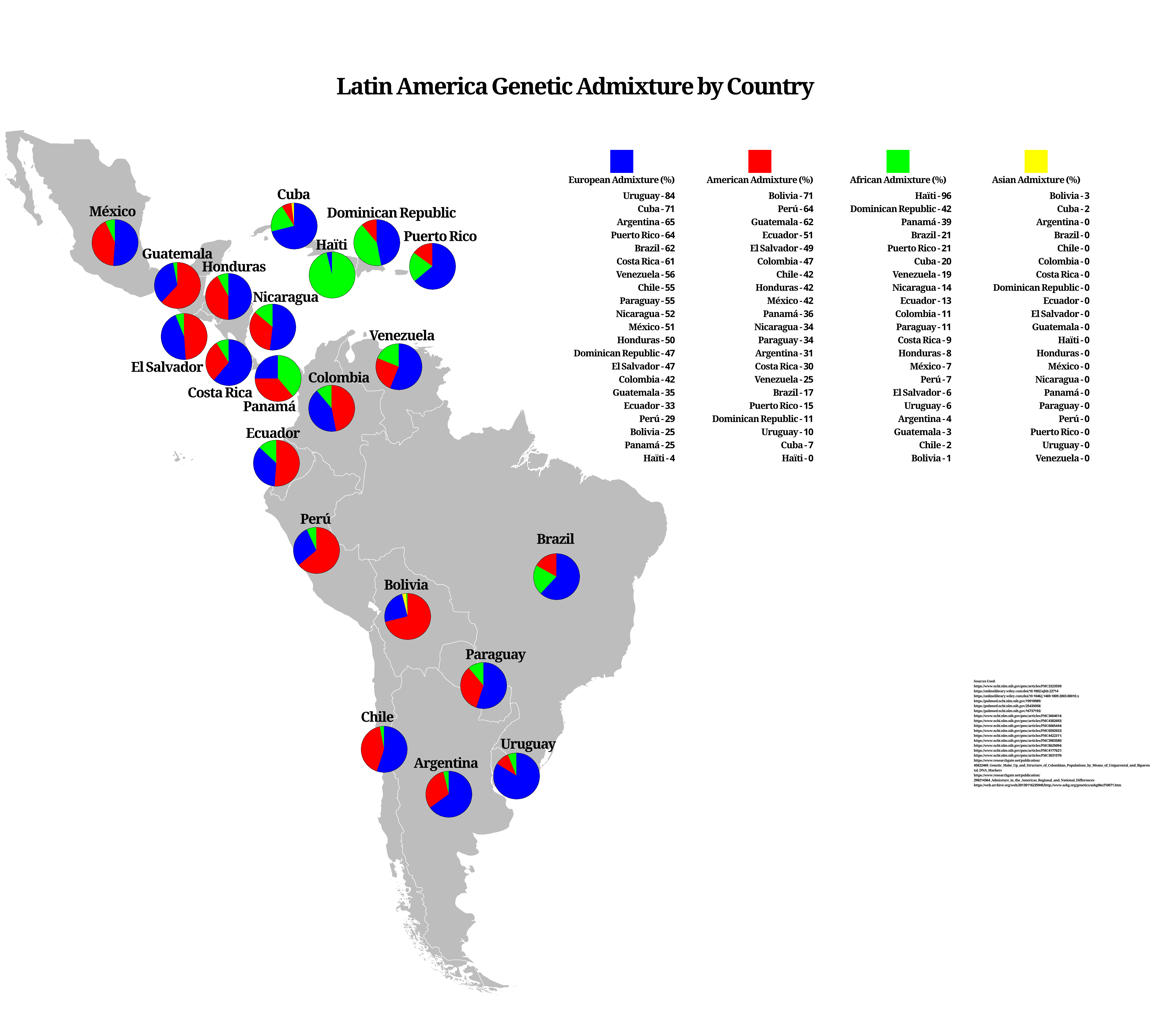
Genetic admixture by country

Country	European/ Caucasoid (%)	Indigenous American (%)	Subsaharan African (%)	East Asian (%)	Year	Samples	Notes
Argentina	78.5	17.3	4.2	0	2010	248	Nationwide
Bolivia	24.6	71.1	0.7	3.6	2013	720	Nationwide
Brazil	62	17	21	0	2015	8 733	Meta-analysis (25 studies)
Chile	55.16	42.38	2.44	0	2015	313	Nationwide
Colombia	62	28	6	4	2014	7,342	Nationwide
Costa Rica	61	30	9	0	2003	2 196	Nationwide
Cuba	71.12	6.87	20.34	1.67	2018	860	Nationwide
Dominican Republic	47	11	42	0	2016	-	Estimation
Ecuador	33	51	13	0	2019	240	Nationwide
Guatemala	35	62	3	0	2015	-	Estimation
Honduras	50	42	8	0	2016	-	Estimation
Mexico	50	45	5	0	2013	934	Nationwide (average of all samples)
Nicaragua	52.1	34.3	13.6	0	2014	151	Nationwide
Panama	25.4	35.87	38.72	0	2002	4 202	Nationwide
Paraguay	55.4	33.8	10.8	0	2021	548	Eastern region (97.5% of population)
Peru	29	64	7	0	2014	906	Nationwide (Mostly in Lima)
Puerto Rico	63.7	15.2	21.2	0	2011	642	Nationwide
El Salvador	46.7	48.8	6.5	0	2014	200	Nationwide
Uruguay	84	10	6	0	2013	-	Nationwide
Venezuela	56	25	19	0	2016	-	Estimation

=== Skin pigmentation ===
In Latin America, human skin color and ancestry are often conflated, with lighter skin commonly assumed as indicative of higher levels of European ancestry. A 20th century study on Mexican Americans used skin reflectance data (a method of measuring the lightness or darkness of skin) as an estimation of European ancestry. However, genetic evidence published in 2019 has challenged this presumption. A genome-wide association study of 6000 Latin Americans from Mexico, Brazil, Colombia, Chile and Peru found that the strongest correlation for light skin color in these populations was actually an amino acid variant of the MFSD12 gene; which is absent in Europeans, but very common in East Asians and Native Americans. The presumption that lighter skin in Latin Americans is an indicator of European ancestry was somewhat unjustified, depending on the gene for light skin.

=== Argentina ===
Genetically, the composition of Argentina is mostly European in ancestry, with Native American and African contributions.

According to a 2006 autosomal DNA study the genetic structure of Argentina would be: 78.0% European, 19.4% Amerindian and 2.5% African. Using other methods it was found that it could be: 80.2% European, 18.1% Amerindian and 1.7% African.

A 2010 autosomal DNA study found that of the total Argentine population, 78.5% percent of the national genepool was European, 17.3% percent Amerindian, and 4.2% percent African.

According to a 2021 investigation, the study of autosomal DIPs show that the genetic contribution is 77.8% European, 17.9% Amerindian and 4.2% African. The X-DIPs matrilineal show 52.9% European, 39.6% Amerindian, and 7.5% African.

A 2022 study based on over 2.785 DNA samples revealed a genetic composition of: 85% Caucasian (74% European + 11% Middle East of which 7% is Jewish), 13% Amerindian and 1% African.

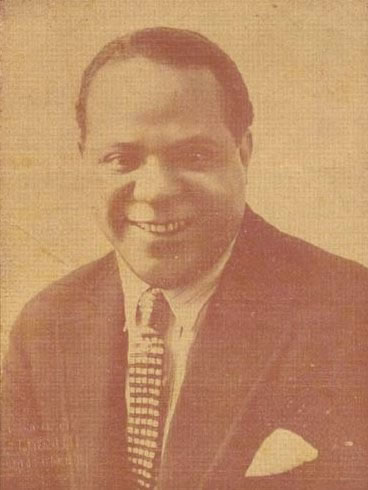
Enrique Maciel, an Argentine of Mulatto ancestry

An unweighted autosomal study from 2012 based in 441 DNA samples found the following composition among samples in the Northeast, Salta, Chubut and Buenos Aires: 65% European, 31% Amerindian and 4% African. The study's conclusion was not to achieve a generalized autosomal average of the country, but rather the existence of genetic heterogeneity among differing sample regions.

- Buenos Aires Province: 76% European, 20% Amerindian and 4% African
- South Zone (Chubut Province): 54% European, 43% Amerindian and 3% African
- Northeast Zone (Misiones, Corrientes, Chaco & Formosa provinces): 54% European, 41% Amerindian and 5% African
- Northwest Zone (Salta Province): 33% European, 64% Amerindian and 3% African

Other studies indicate that the genetic composition between regions would be:

- Central Zone: 81% European, 15% Amerindian and 4% African
- South Zone: 68% European, 28% Amerindian and 4% African
- Northeast Zone: 79% European, 17% Amerindian and 4% African
- Northwest Zone: 55% European, 35% Amerindian and 10% African

A 2015 genomic study found a mix: 67% European, 28% Amerindian, 4% African and 1.4% Asian.

=== Brazil ===
Genetic studies have shown the Brazilian population as a whole to have European, African and Native American components.

An autosomal study from 2013, with nearly 1300 samples from all of the Brazilian regions, found a predominant degree of European ancestry combined with African and Native American contributions, in varying degrees. 'Following an increasing North to South gradient, European ancestry was the most prevalent in all urban populations (with values up to 74%). The populations in the North consisted of a significant proportion of Native American ancestry that was about two times higher than the African contribution. Conversely, in the Northeast, Center-West and Southeast, African ancestry was the second most prevalent. At an intrapopulation level, all urban populations were highly admixed, and most of the variation in ancestry proportions was observed between individuals within each population rather than among population'.

Region	European	African	Native American
North Region	51%	17%	32%
Northeast Region	56%	28%	16%
Central-West Region	58%	26%	16%
Southeast Region	61%	27%	12%
South Region	74%	15%	11%

An autosomal DNA study (2011), with nearly 1000 samples from all over the country ("whites", "pardos" and "blacks", according to their respective proportions), found a major European contribution, followed by a high African contribution and an important Native American component. "In all regions studied, the European ancestry was predominant, with proportions ranging from 60.6% in the Northeast to 77.7% in the South". The 2011 autosomal study samples came from blood donors (the lowest classes constitute the great majority of blood donors in Brazil), and also public health institutions' personnel and health students. The study showed that Brazilians from different regions are more homogenous than previously thought by some based on the census alone. "Brazilian homogeneity is, therefore, a lot greater between Brazilian regions than within Brazilian regions".

Region	European	African	Native American
Northern Brazil	68.80%	10.50%	18.50%
Northeast of Brazil	60.10%	29.30%	8.90%
Southeast Brazil	74.20%	17.30%	7.30%
Southern Brazil	79.50%	10.30%	9.40%

According to a DNA study from 2010, "a new portrayal of each ethnicity contribution to the DNA of Brazilians, obtained with samples from the five regions of the country, has indicated that, on average, European ancestors are responsible for nearly 80% of the genetic heritage of the population. The variation between the regions is small, with the possible exception of the South, where the European contribution reaches nearly 90%. The results, published by the scientific magazine American Journal of Human Biology by a team of the Catholic University of Brasília, show that in Brazil, physical indicators such as skin colour, colour of the eyes and colour of the hair have little to do with the genetic ancestry of each person, which has been shown in previous studies (regardless of census classification). "Ancestry informative SNPs can be useful to estimate individual and population biogeographical ancestry. Brazilian population is characterized by a genetic background of three parental populations (European, African, and Brazilian Native Amerindians) with a wide degree and diverse patterns of admixture. In this work we analyzed the information content of 28 ancestry-informative SNPs into multiplexed panels using three parental population sources (African, Amerindian, and European) to infer the genetic admixture in an urban sample of the five Brazilian geopolitical regions. The SNPs assigned apart the parental populations from each other and thus can be applied for ancestry estimation in a three hybrid admixed population. Data was used to infer genetic ancestry in Brazilians with an admixture model. Pairwise estimates of F(st) among the five Brazilian geopolitical regions suggested little genetic differentiation only between the South and the remaining regions. Estimates of ancestry results are consistent with the heterogeneous genetic profile of Brazilian population, with a major contribution of European ancestry (0.771) followed by African (0.143) and Amerindian contributions (0.085). The described multiplexed SNP panels can be useful tool for bioanthropological studies but it can be mainly valuable to control for spurious results in genetic association studies in admixed populations". It is important to note that "the samples came from free of charge paternity test takers, thus as the researchers made it explicit: "the paternity tests were free of charge, the population samples involved people of variable socioeconomic strata, although likely to be leaning slightly towards the pardo group".

Region	European	African	Native American
North Region	71.10%	18.20%	10.70%
Northeast Region	77.40%	13.60%	8.90%
Central-West Region	65.90%	18.70%	11.80%
Southeast Region	79.90%	14.10%	6.10%
South Region	87.70%	7.70%	5.20%

An autosomal DNA study from 2009 found a similar profile: "all the Brazilian samples (regions) lie more closely to the European group than to the African populations or to the Mestizos from Mexico".

Region	European	African	Native American
North Region	60.6%	21.3%	18.1%
Northeast Region	66.7%	23.3%	10.0%
Central-West Region	66.3%	21.7%	12.0%
Southeast Region	60.7%	32.0%	7.3%
South Region	81.5%	9.3%	9.2%

A 2015 autosomal genetic study, which also analysed data of 25 studies of 38 different Brazilian populations concluded that: European ancestry accounts for 62% of the heritage of the population, followed by the African (21%) and the Native American (17%). The European contribution is highest in Southern Brazil (77%), the African highest in Northeast Brazil (27%) and the Native American is the highest in Northern Brazil (32%).

Region	European	African	Native American
North Region	51%	16%	32%
Northeast Region	58%	27%	15%
Central-West Region	64%	24%	12%
Southeast Region	67%	23%	10%
South Region	77%	12%	11%

According to another autosomal DNA study from 2008, by the University of Brasília (UnB), European ancestry dominates in the whole of Brazil (in all regions), accounting for 65.90% of heritage of the population, followed by the African contribution (24.80%) and the Native American (9.3%).

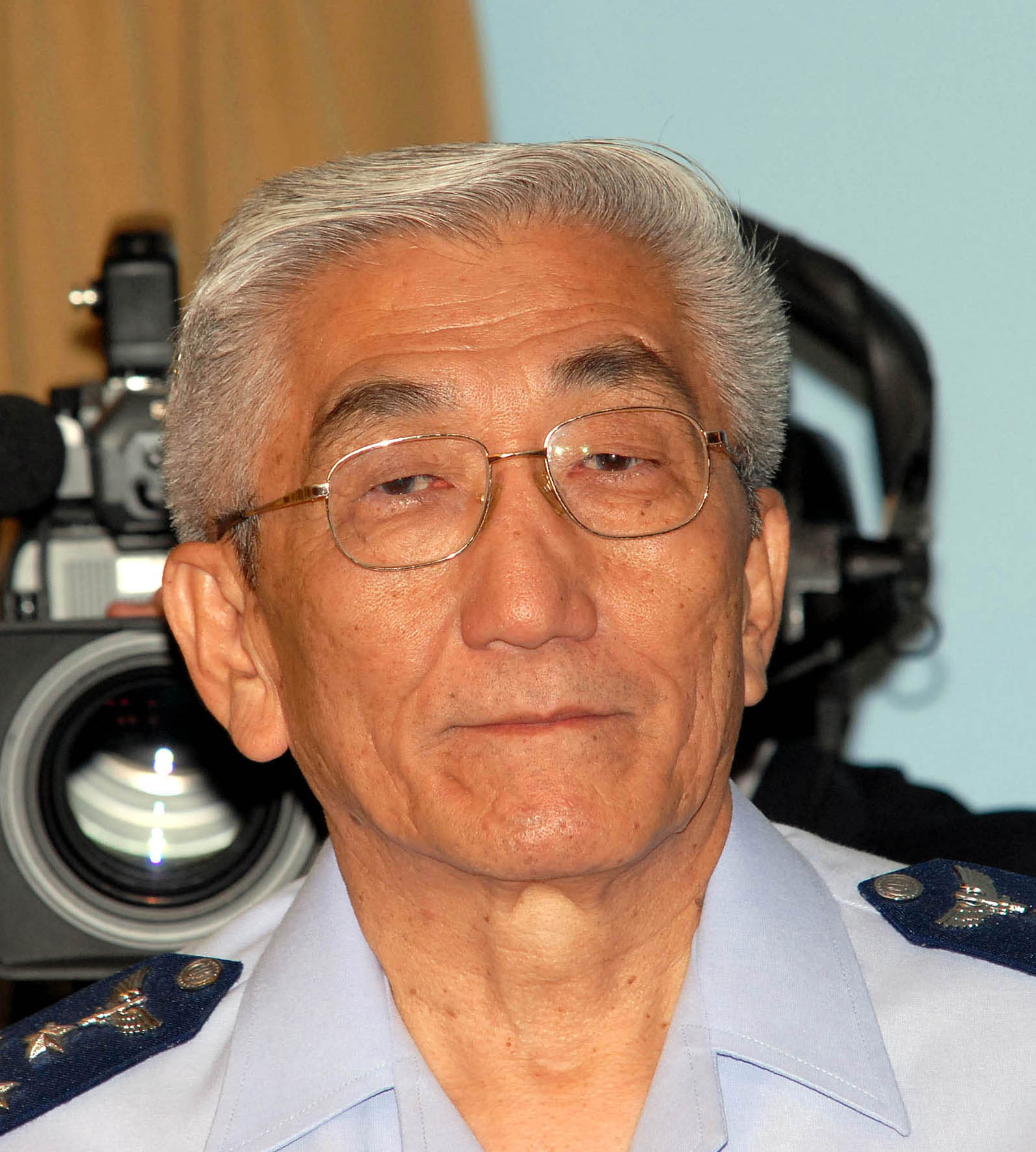
Juniti Saito, head of the Brazilian Air Force and one of over a million Japanese Brazilians

São Paulo state, the most populous state in Brazil, with about 40 million people, showed the following composition, according to an autosomal study from 2006: European genes account for 79% of the heritage of the people of São Paulo, 14% are of African origin, and 7% Native American. A more recent study, from 2013, found the following composition in São Paulo state: 61.9% European, 25.5% African and 11.6% Native American.

=== Chile ===
According to 1994 genetic research based on blood types, by Ricardo Cruz-Coke and Rodrigo Moreno, Chilean genetic admixture consists of 64% European, 35% Amerindian, and 1% African ancestry. The European admixture goes from 81% in East Santiago to 61% in West Santiago. Valparaiso (Chilean central coast) and Concepción (central southern Chile) have 77% and 75% of European genetic admixture respectively.

An autosomal DNA study from 2014 found the Chilean overall national genepool to be 44.34% (± 3.9%) Native American contribution, 51.85% (± 5.44%) European contribution, and 3.81% (± 0.45%) African contribution. The samples came from all the 15 regions of Chile, and they were collected in Arica, as the researchers made it clear: "Beginning 2011, 923 volunteers from all 15 regions of Chile, living temporarily or permanently in Arica, with an average age of 28.05 ± 9.37 and belonging to social classes A and B (4%), CA and CB (60%) and D (36%) were invited to participate on this study".

A 2015 autosomal DNA study found Chile to be 55.16% European, 42.38% Native American and 2.44% African (using LAMP-LD) and 43.22% Native American, 54.38% European and 2.40% African (using RFMix).

Another 2015 autosomal DNA study carried out in two public hospitals found Chile to be 57.20% European, 38.70% Native American and 2.5% African.

A 2020 autosomal DNA arrived at the following conclusion: "The country's average ancestry was 0.53 ± 0.14 European, 0.04 ± 0.04 African, and 0.42 ± 0.14 Amerindian, disaggregated into 0.18 ± 0.15 Aymara and 0.25 ± 0.13 Mapuche. However, Mapuche ancestry was highest in the south (40.03%) and Aymara in the north (35.61%) as expected from the historical location of these ethnic groups".

Chilean mitochondrial DNA and Y-chromosome studies indicate mostly Native American haplogroups on the maternal side and European haplogroups on the paternal side.

=== Colombia ===
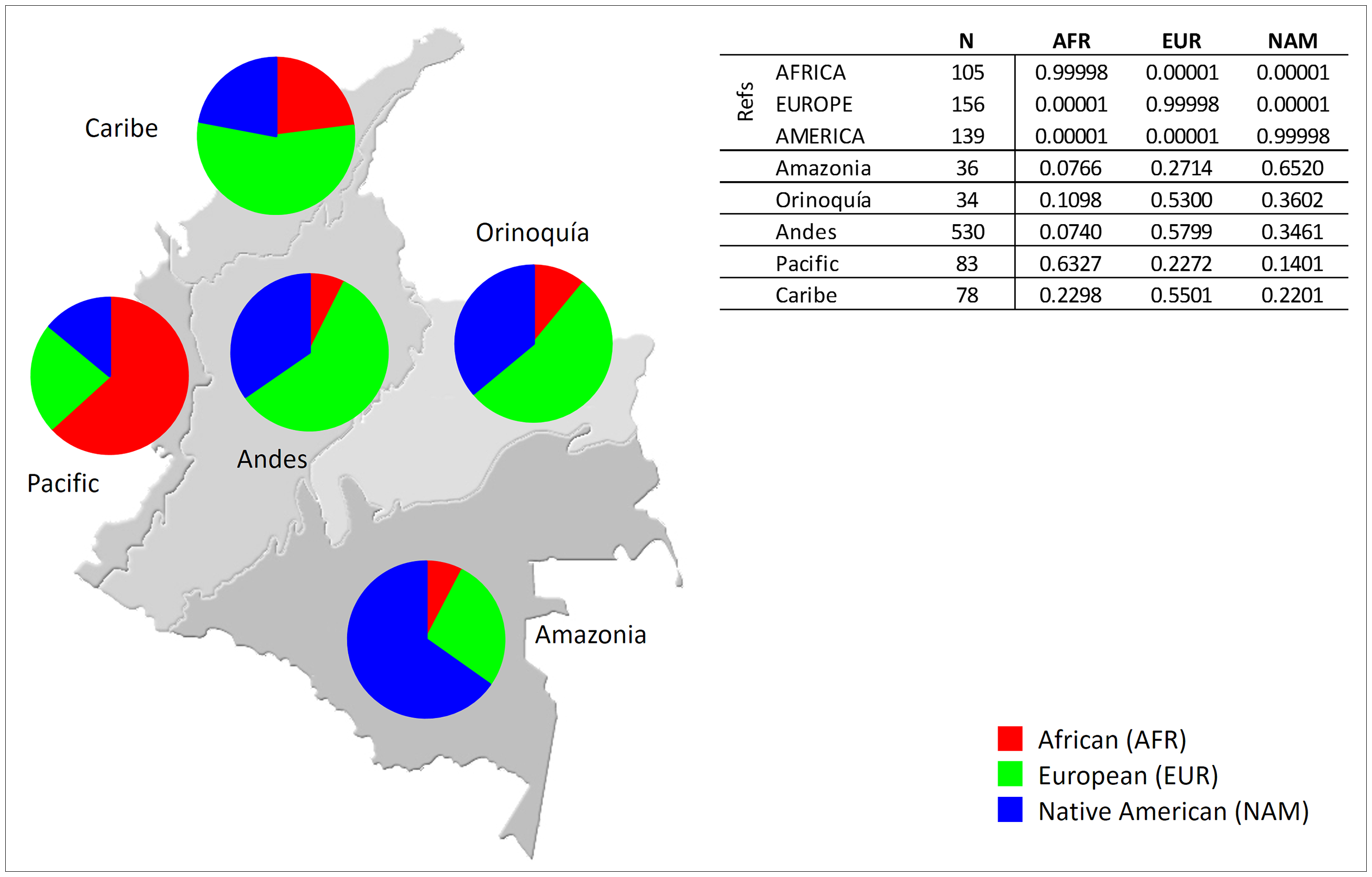
Genetic composition of Colombia by region, according to (Ossa et al., 2016).

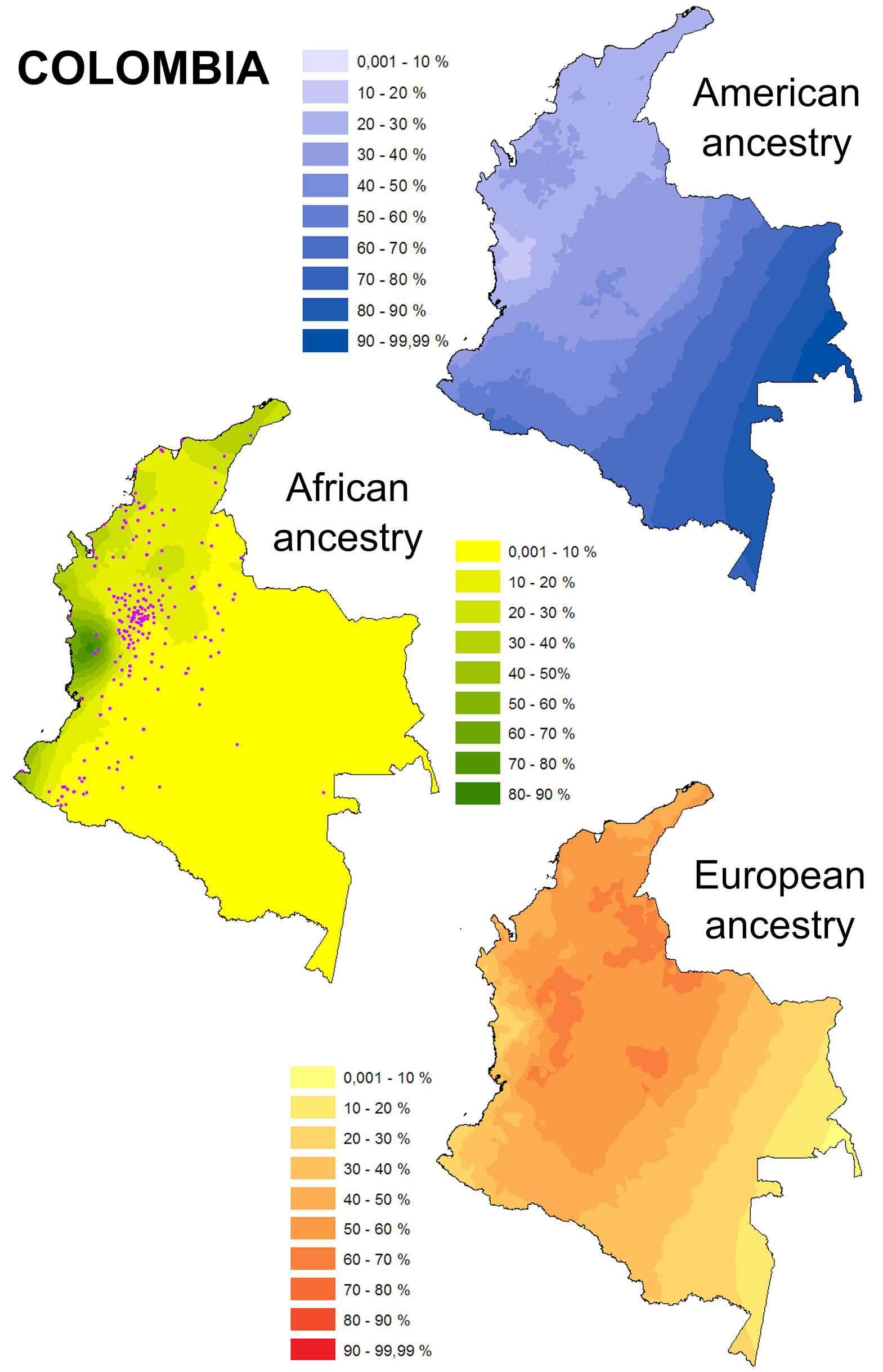
Ethnic distribution of European, Amerindian, and African ancestry in the country, according to (Ruiz-Linares et al., 2016).

- (Yunis, 1993), from the National University of Colombia, analyzed eight genetic systems in 30,259 individuals and determined that regional ancestry was distributed as follows:

Region	Departments	Caucasian contribution	Indigenous contribution	Black contribution
Amazonia	Caquetá, Putumayo, Guainía, Amazonas	64%–67%	29%–32%	3%–4%
Andean	Cundinamarca, Boyacá, Valle del Cauca, Antioquia, Nariño, Tolima, Caldas, Santander, Huila, Cauca, Risaralda, Norte de Santander, Quindío, Cesar, Bolívar	64%–66%	27%–29%	7%
Caribbean	Atlántico, Bolívar, Magdalena, Sucre, Cesar, La Guajira, Córdoba, Urabá	53%–58%	17%–24%	23%–25%
Insular	San Andrés and Providencia	41%–44%	0%–2%	56%–57%
Orinoquía	Meta, Casanare, Arauca, Vichada	66%–68%	28%–31%	3%–4%
Pacific	Chocó, Nariño, Valle del Cauca, Cauca	28%–30%	16%–19%	53%–54%
Colombia		61%–63%	26%–29%	10%–11%

The same study found that at the subregional level, genetic ancestry was as follows:

Subregion	Caucasian contribution	Indigenous contribution	Black contribution
Antioquia	65.0%–73.0%	14.0%–20.0%	14.5%
Boyacá	62.0%–71.0%	26.0%–35.0%	2.5%
Caribbean (without Urabá)	49.0%–56.0%	19.0%–26.0%	26.0%
Cauca	33.0%–40.0%	34.0%–41.3%	26.0%
Chocó	14.0%–16.5%	7.5%–10.6%	76.0%
Cundinamarca	62.0%–71.0%	25.0%–34.0%	3.5%
Nariño	43.0%–52.0%	40.0%–49.0%	7.8%
Eastern (Amazonia and Orinoquía)	60.0%–69.0%	27.5%–36.0%	3.9%
Pacific (with Urabá)	32.0%–35.0%	14.0%–15.0%	51.0%
Paisa (Antioquia and Viejo Caldas)	64.0%–71.0%	17.0%–24.0%	11.7%
Santanderes	65.0%–73.0%	21.0%–29.0%	5.9%
Tolima Grande	59.0%–67.0%	26.0%–34.0%	6.8%
Valle del Cauca	50.0%–57.0%	22.0%–29.0%	21.0%
Viejo Caldas	65.0%–73.0%	19.0%–26.0%	8.8%

- According to (Ossa et al., 2016), in a study carried out across the five Natural regions of Colombia, the genetic composition is as follows:

Region	Departments	Samples	African contribution	European contribution	Native American contribution
Amazonia	Amazonas, Guainía, Caquetá, Putumayo	36	7.66%	27.14%	65.20%
Andes	Antioquia, Boyacá, Caldas, Cundinamarca, Huila, Nariño, Norte de Santander, Putumayo, Quindío, Risaralda, Santander, Tolima, Valle del Cauca	530	7.40%	57.99%	34.61%
Caribbean	Atlántico, Bolívar, Cesar, Córdoba, La Guajira, Magdalena, Sucre	78	22.98%	55.01%	22.01%
Orinoquía	Arauca, Casanare, Meta	34	10.98%	53.00%	36.02%
Pacific	Chocó	83	63.27%	22.72%	14.01%

In the same study, the Andean region was divided into six subregions, whose genetic composition was as follows:

Subregion	Departments	Number of samples	African contribution	European contribution	Native American contribution
Central-East	Boyacá, Cundinamarca	143	5.10%	58.86%	36.04%
Central-West	Antioquia, Caldas, Quindío, Risaralda	59	7.87%	66.91%	25.22%
Northeast	Norte de Santander, Santander	150	6.93%	58.10%	34.97%
West	Valle del Cauca	44	14.04%	55.43%	30.54%
Southeast	Huila, Tolima	118	8.12%	54.54%	37.34%
Southwest	Nariño, Putumayo	16	7.07%	48.65%	44.28%

Some studies with samples collected in Paisa region, a genetically isolated population, found the highest European contribution in Colombia. For example, a 2014 genetic research found admixture in antioquia be 75% European, 20% Native and 10% African.

An autosomal research from 2016 estimated genetic admixture in natural regions of Colombia. European ancestry was slightly predominant in Andean, Caribbean and Orinoquía regions (58%, 55% and 53%, respectively), with African ancestry being dominant in Pacific region (63%) and Native ancestry in Amazon region (65%).

Natural region	European	Native American	African
Amazon Region	27.14%	65.20%	7.66%
Andean Region	57.99%	34.61%	7.4%
Caribbean Region	55.01%	22.01%	22.98%
Orinoquía Region	53.00%	36.02%	10.98%
Pacific Region	22.72%	14.01%	63.27%

The study also estimated admixture in six sub-regions of Andean Colombia. European admixture was higher in Central-West (67%), followed by Central-East and Northeast sub-regions (59% and 58%, respectively). Native ancestry was higher in Southwest (44%) and African ancestry in West sub-region (14%).

Sub-region	European	Native American	African
Central-East Sub-region	58.86%	36.04%	5.10%
Central-West Sub-region	66.91%	25.22%	7.87%
Northeast Sub-region	58.10%	34.97%	6.93%
Southeast Sub-region	54.54%	37.34%	8.12
Southwest Sub-region	48.65%	44.28%	7.07%
West Sub-region	55.43%	30.54%	14.04%

=== Costa Rica ===
Costa Rica was one of the more isolated populations of New Spain.

While the majority of Costa Ricans identify as of criollo or castizo descent, genetic studies demonstrate considerable pre-Columbian Amerindian and a smaller African ancestry.

According to an autosomal study, the genetic makeup of Costa Rica is 61% percent European, 30% percent Amerindian and 9% percent African. Regional variation was observed, with greater European influence in the northern (66%) and central (65%) regions. Increased Amerindian ancestry was found in the south (38%), and a higher African contribution in coastal regions (14% in the Pacific and 13% in the Atlantic).

The Central Valley—where more than half of Costa Ricans live—has a mestizo population with one of the highest European components in Latin America, comparable with other areas with low pre-Columbian Native ancestry (then occupied by heterogeneous groups of hunter-gatherers) and where the current Native population is sparse. During the Spanish colonization of the Americas, Costa Rica was one of the more isolated regions in the Americas. According to genetic studies, the average Costa Rican from the Central Valley is 67 percent European, 29 percent Native and 4 percent Subsaharan African.

=== Cuba ===
An autosomal study from 2014 has found the genetic ancestry in Cuba to be 72% European, 20% African and 8% Native American.

=== Dominican Republic ===
According to a recent autosomal study, the genetic composition of the Dominican Republic was 51.2 percent European, 41.8 percent African and 8 percent Native.

=== Ecuador ===
According to a 2010 DNA autosomal study, the genetic composition of genepool of Ecuadorians is 53.9% Native American, 38.8% European, and 7.3% African.

Another genetic study shows Ecuadorias are 64.6% Native American, 31.0% European, and 4.4% African.

According to a 2015 DNA autosomal study, the composition of Ecuador is: 50.1% Native American, 40.8% European, 6.8% African and 2.3% Asian.

=== El Salvador ===
A large majority of the population is declared mestizos. El Salvador is one of the most homogeneous countries in Latin America. According to a genetic research from 2015, Salvadoran genetic admixture is 48.8% Amerindian, 46.7% European, and 4.5% African. The genetic study "Genetic Components in America's demography" revealed a similar genetic mix and genetic makeup, with 52% European component, 40% Amerindian component, 6% African and 2% Arab.

According to an autosomal DNA study from 2008, by the University of Brasília (UnB), Salvadoran genetic admixture is 75.2% Amerindian, 15.1% European, and 9.7% African.

According to the study Population data for 12 Y-chromosome STR loci in a sample from El Salvador, the study revealed that the population of El Salvador was closer to the European conglomerate (composed of European and South American general population samples from Brazil, Argentina, Colombia and Venezuela) than to the group of native and mestizo populations of Central and South America, which can be explained by the differences in the proportion of European contributions versus Amerindian in these population groups.

=== Guatemala ===
The study "Geographic Patterns of Genome Admixture in Latin American Mestizos" by PLoS Genetics found that the composition of Guatemala were 55% Amerindian, 41% European, and 4% African into Ladinos (mestizo and white people), for the ethnic Amerindians were 92% Amerindian and 8% European.

=== Mexico ===
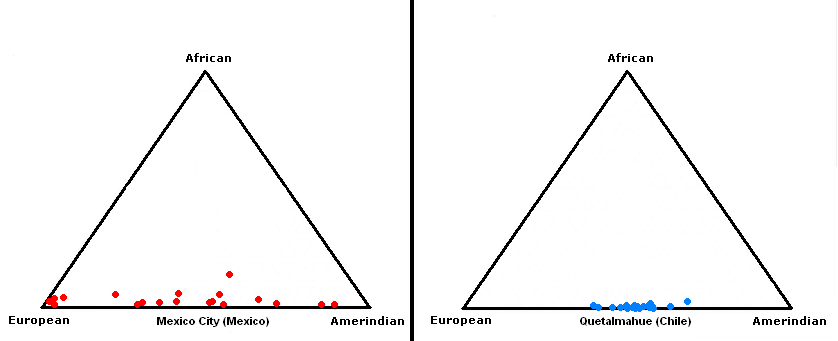
The Mexican mestizo population is the most variable in Latin America, with people's mixed composition being either largely European, or largely Amerindian, rather than having a uniform admixture nationwide. Distribution of Admixture Estimates for Individuals from Mexico City and Quetalmahue (indigenous community in Chile).

A 2007 autosomal study estimated that the average admixture of Mexicans is approximately 50% European, 45% Amerindian, and 5% African. Higher Amerindian ancestry on the X chromosome was observed, consistent with predominantly European patrilineal and Native American matrilineal ancestry.

A 2009 autosomal study found average admixture of Mexican Mestizos from six states (Guanajuato, Guerrero, Sonora, Veracruz, Yucatan and Zacatecas) to be 55.2% Native, 41.8% European, 1.8% African and 1.2% Asian.

Likewise, a 2012 genetic study conducted over samples of six states (Guanajuato, Guerrero, Sonora, Tamaulipas, Veracruz, Yucatan and Zacatecas), found average admixture to be 54.4% Native, 40.2% European and 5.4% African.

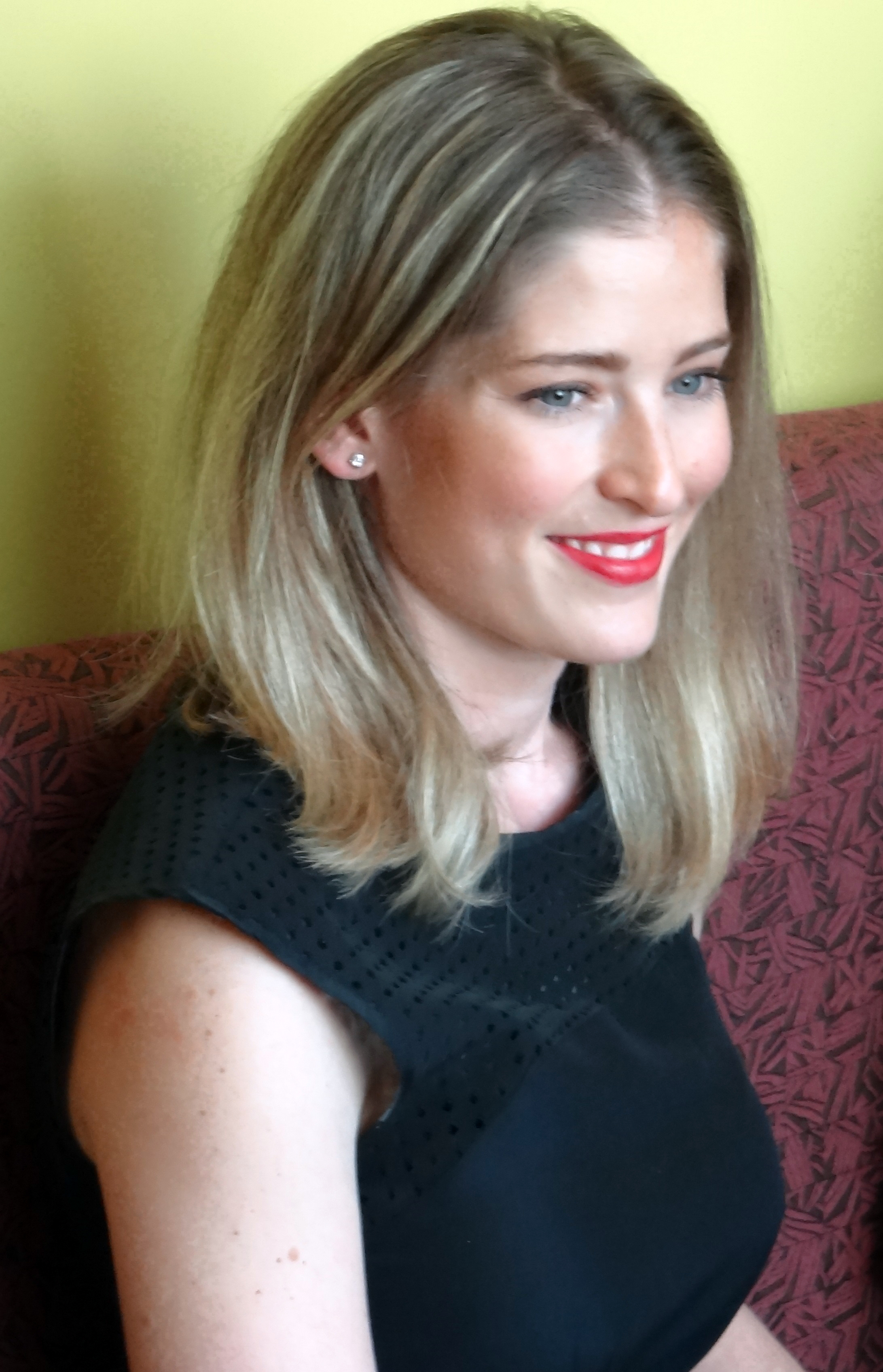
Maria Ines Guerra is a Mexican TV presenter and singer.

A study by Mexico's National Institute of Genomic Medicine (INMEGEN) reported that mestizo Mexicans are on average 58.96% European, 31.05% Amerindian, and 10.03% African. The African contribution ranges from 2.8 percent in Sonora to 11.13 percent in Veracruz. Eighty percent of the population was classified as mestizo (racially mixed to some degree). The study was conducted among volunteers from six states (Guanajuato, Oaxaca, Sonora, Veracruz, Yucatan and Zacatecas) and an indigenous group, the Zapotecs.

A study in Mexico City found that its mestizo population had the greatest variation in Latin America, with its mestizos being either largely European or Amerindian rather than having a uniform admixture. The study's results are similar to those by INMEGEN in which the European admixture is 56.8 percent, followed by Native American ancestry with 39.8 percent and an African contribution of 3.4 percent. Additional studies suggest a correlation between greater European admixture with a higher socioeconomic status, and greater Amerindian ancestry with a lower socioeconomic status. A study of low-income Mexicans found the mean admixture to be 0.590, 0.348 and 0.062 Amerindian, European and African respectively, while a study of Mexicans with an income higher than the mean found their European admixture to be 82 percent. On average, 68 haplotypes account for 95% of the chromosomes in Mexicans.

According to a nationwide study in 2018, the genetic admixture of modern Mexicans averaged 60% Native American, 36% European, and 4% African.

=== Nicaragua ===
Kirkegaard and Fuerst´s study with 688 Nicaraguans from overall country found majority of European genes at 57%, follow by Native American genes at 23% and very close African genes at 20%.

A genetic study with 100 Nicaraguan samples from Western and Southern part of the country, found average admixture to be 48,66% European, 36,83% Amerindian and 16,29% African.

According to an investigation from 2010, the Nicaraguan average admixture is 69% European, 20% African and 11% Amerindian.

=== Peru ===
According to genetic research in 2020, Peruvian genetic admixture consists of 63,6% Amerindian, 29,3% European, 3,8% African ancestry and 2,9% asian ancestry .

According to a 2015 DNA autosomal study, the composition of Peru is: 68.3% Native American, 26.0% European, 3.2% African and 2.5% Asian.

=== Uruguay ===
A 2009 DNA study in the American Journal of Human Biology showed the genetic contribution to the genepool of Uruguay as a whole is primarily derived from Europe, with Native American ancestry ranging from 1 to 10 percent and African from 7 to 15 percent (depending on region). A 2014 study, "in agreement with those obtained from a study using nDNA", put the average for the whole country as 6% African and 10% Native American.

== See also ==
- Race and ethnicity in Latin America
