= Raza =

Raza is a masculine given name and surname of Arabic origin. Notable people with the name include:

== Given name ==
- Raza Ali Abidi (born 1935), Pakistani journalist
- Raza Aizad, Pakistani general
- Raza Ali Dar (born 1987), Pakistani cricketer
- Raza Nasrullah Ghumman, Pakistani politician
- Raza Haider (died 2010), Pakistani politician
- Raza Haroon (born 1965), Pakistani politician
- Raza Hasan (born 1992), Pakistani cricketer
- Raza-ul-Hasan (born 1987), Pakistani cricketer
- Raza Hayat Hiraj (born 1965), Pakistani politician
- Raza Husain, British human rights lawyer
- Raza Jaffrey (born 1975), English actor
- Raza Kazim (1930–2026), Pakistani lawyer, philosopher, inventor, and former politician
- Raza Ali Khan (born 1962), Indian classical vocalist
- Raza Ali Khan of Rampur (1908–1966), nawab of Rampur
- Raza Rabbani Khar, Pakistani politician
- Raza Mir (1927–2002), Pakistani cinematographer, film producer, and director
- Raza Muhammad (born 1957), Pakistani general
- Raza Murad (born 1950), Indian actor
- Raza Saqib Mustafai (born 1972), Pakistani Islamic preacher and scholar
- Raza Rabbani (born 1953), Pakistani politician and lawyer
- Raza-ur-Rehman (born 1985), Zimbabwean-Canadian cricketer
- Raza Rumi, Pakistani policy analyst
- Raza Talish, Pakistani actor and director
- Raza Naqvi Wahi (1914–2002), Indian Urdu-language poet
- Ahmed Raza Khan Barelvi (1856–1921), Indian Islamic scholar

== Surname ==
- Raheel Raza (born 1949), Canadian author and feminist
- S. H. Raza (1922–2016), Indian artist
- Saleem Raza (disambiguation), multiple people
- Sardar Muhammad Raza (born 1945), Pakistani election commissioner and judge

== Fictional characters ==
- Raza, a fictional R&AW agent portrayed by Shaji Chaudhary in the 2023 Indian film Pathaan
- Raza Longknife, a Marvel comic book character

== Other ==
- Raza (film), a 1942 Spanish film
- Raza Microelectronics Inc, a private semiconductor company in California
- Raza Odiada, a 1995 album by Brujeria
- Raza Unida Party, an American political party
- Holy Qurbana, liturgy in the Assyrian Church of the East, from the Aramaic

== See also ==
- Reza (disambiguation)
- La Raza (disambiguation)
