= Rasam =

Rasam refers to:

- Rasam (dish), an Indian soup
- Rasam (film), a 2015 feature film
- Rasam (serial), a Pakistani television drama

== See also ==
- Rasa
- Razam (disambiguation)
