= La Raza Studies =

La Raza Studies may refer to:

- La Raza
- Chican@ Studies
- Latin American Studies
