= Saleem Raza =

Saleem Raza may refer to:

- Saleem Raza (cricketer)
- Saleem Raza (singer)
