= Monumento a la Raza (Seville) =

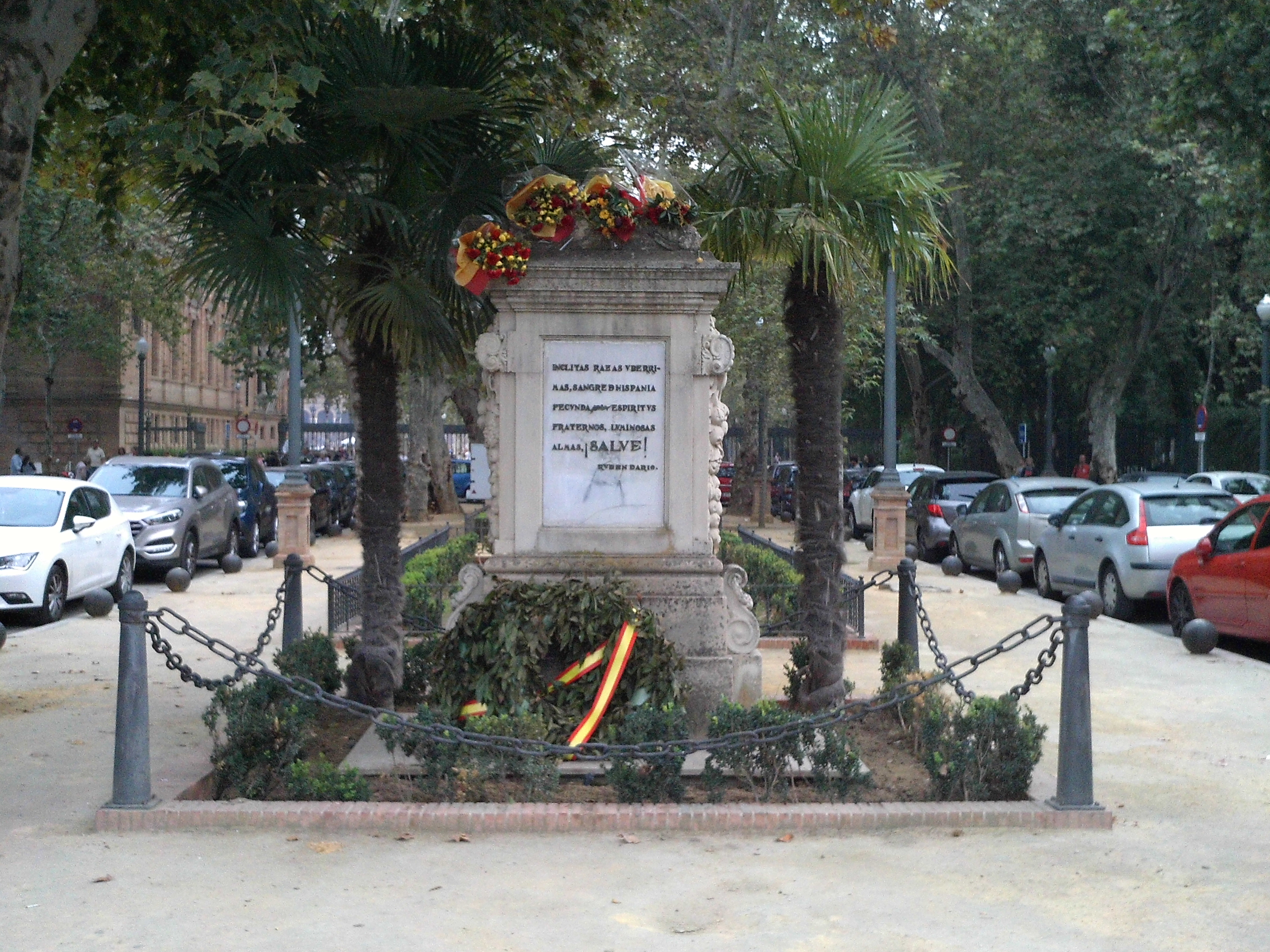
- The monument in October 2016
- Interactive map of Monumento a la Raza
- Location: Seville, Spain
- Coordinates: 37°22′43″N 5°59′20″W
- Designer: Santiago Martínez
- Material: Marble
- Completion date: 1929
- Opening date: 12 October 1929
- Dedicated date: Día de la Hispanidad
- Restored date: 2018
- Dedicated to: La Raza

The Monumento a la Raza is an outdoor marble monument in the city of Seville, Andalusia, Spain. It stands along the edge of María Luisa Park and was inaugurated on 12 October 1929—the Día de la Hispanidad (Columbus Day). The monument has written part of the 1905 poem "Salutación del optimista", by Nicaraguan poet Rubén Darío (1867–1916).

== History and construction ==
The monument location within María Luisa Park (far left, No. 41)

The idea for the Monumento a la Raza originated with the organizers of the Ibero-American Exposition of 1929. Luis Rodríguez Caso, the exposition's main organiser, proposed building a 100-metre (330 ft) concrete column in Seville's Triana neighbourhood. His plan included restaurants and a viewing platform at the top, both accessible by lifts.

Santiago Martnez created the final memorial project and it was inaugurated on 12 October 1929, the Día de la Hispanidad (the Spanish-speaking equivalent of Columbus Day). It is located t is located on Avenida Isabel la Católica, within María Luisa Park, near the north tower of the Seville's Plaza de España.

In the middle of 2018, the Seville Urban Planning Management Agency carried out a restoration of the monument.

== Description ==
The Monumento a la Raza is a marble stele.

=== Poem ===
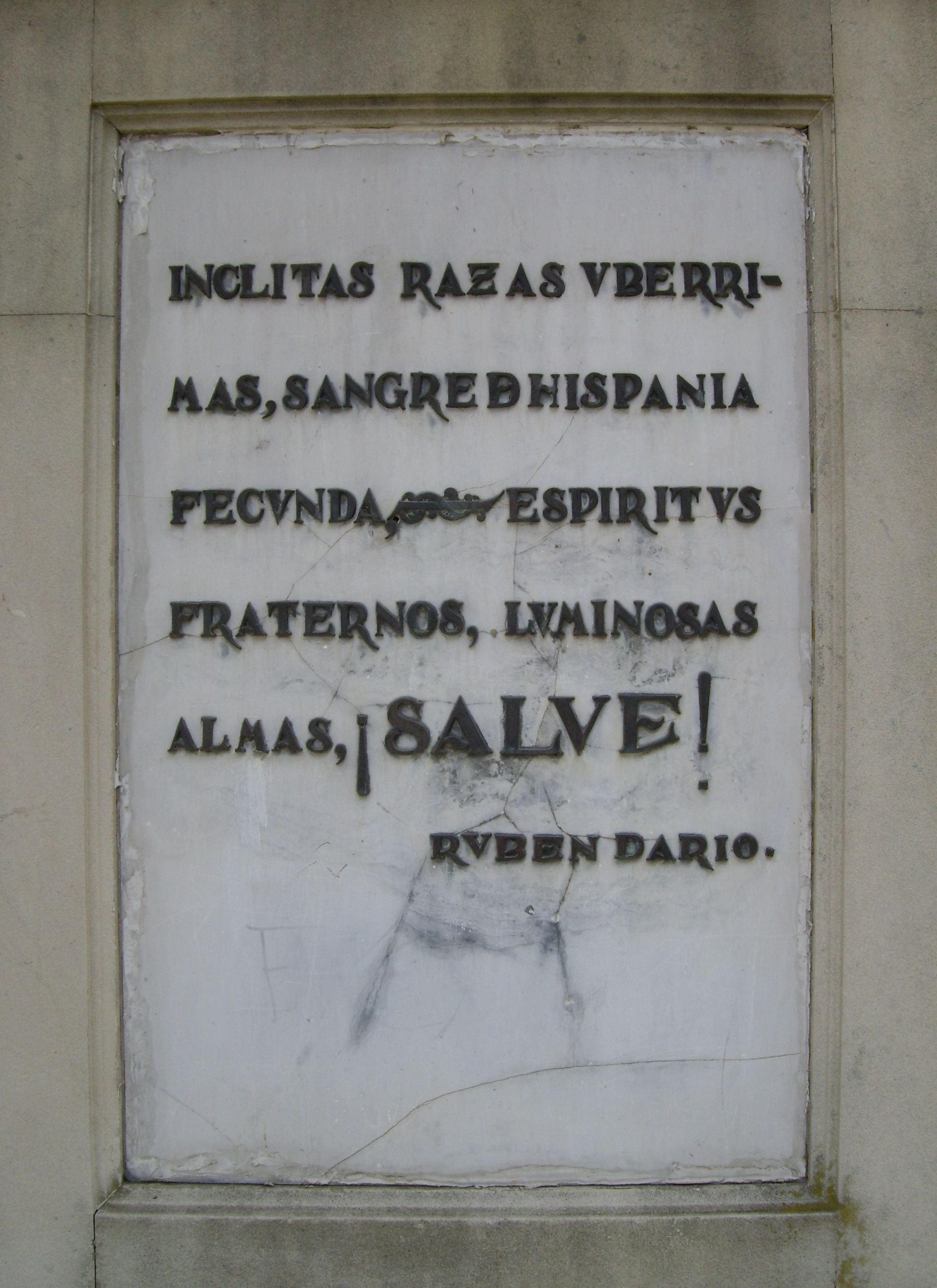
Detail of the poem

The poem "Salutación del optimista" (1905), written by Nicaraguan poet Rubén Darío (1867–1916), is inscribed in bronze across the monument as a salutation to Hispanic Americans.

Inscription (in Spanish)

Ínclitas razas ubérrimas,
sangre de Hispania fecunda,
espíritus fraternos,
luminosas almas, ¡salve!

Inscription (in English)

Illustrious, most fruitful races,
fecund blood of Hispania,
fraternal spirits,
lumious souls, greetings!
