= Monterrey La Raza =

Monterrey La Raza refers to one of two different indoor soccer franchises:

- Monterrey La Raza (1992–2001), a defunct indoor soccer team that operated in the Continental Indoor Soccer League and World Indoor Soccer League
- Monterrey La Raza (2007–10), a defunct indoor soccer team which operated in the Major Indoor Soccer League
