= Race and ethnicity in Latin America =

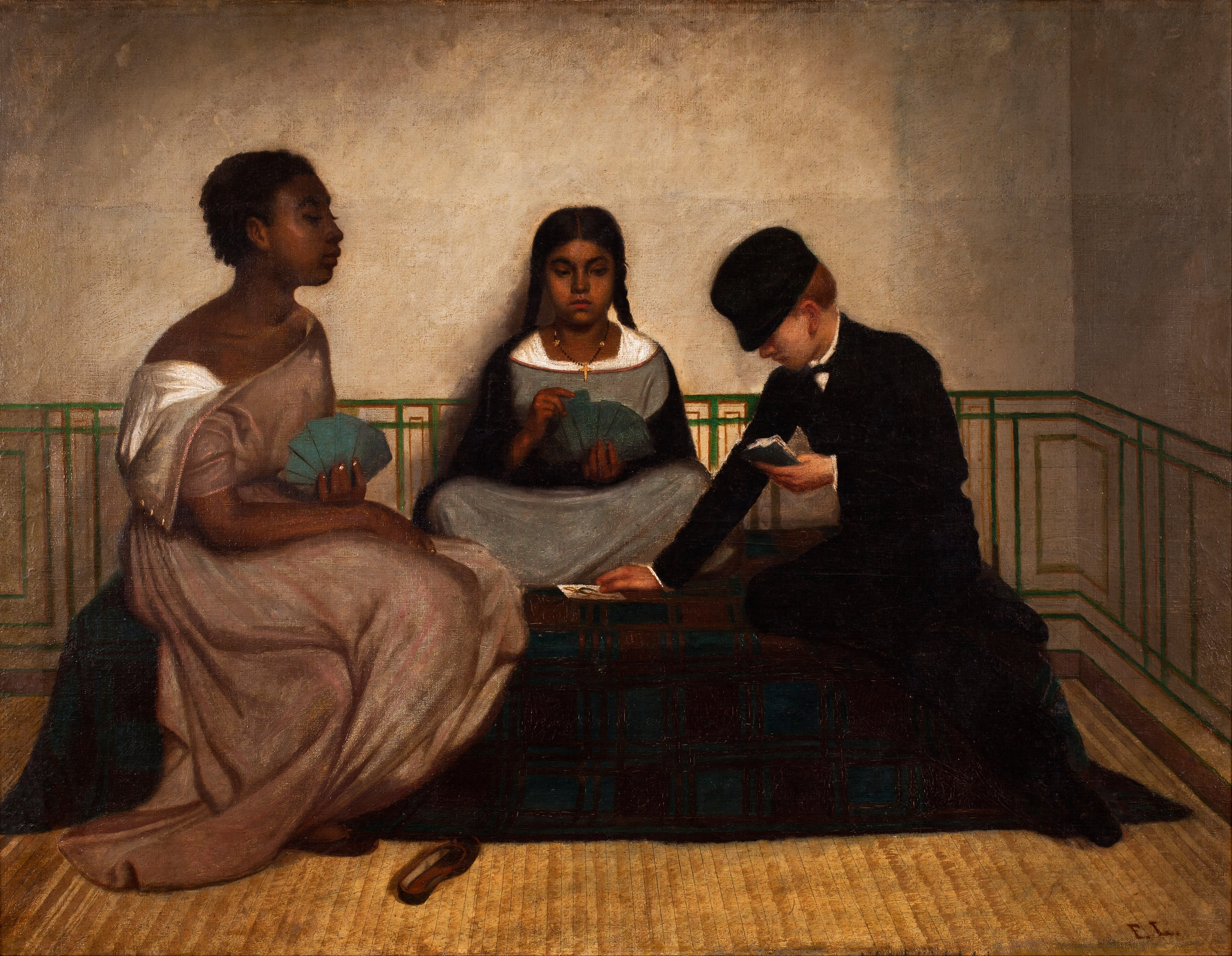
The Three Races or Equality before the Law, c. 1859, Francisco Laso, Peru

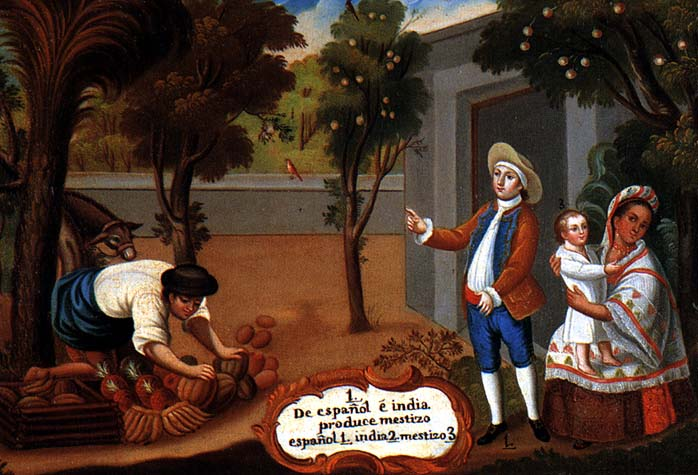
De español é india, produce mestizo "from Spanish man and Indian woman comes mestizo." (Pintura de castas, c. 1780), unknown author, Mexico

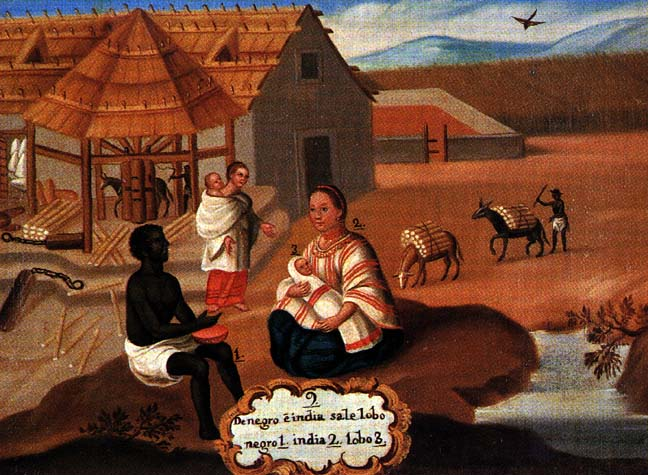
De negro é india sale lobo "from black man and Indian woman comes 'wolf' (Zambo)." (Pintura de castas, c. 1780), unknown author, Mexico

There is no single system of races or ethnicities that covers all modern Latin America, and usage of labels may vary substantially.

In Mexico, for example, the category mestizo is not defined or applied the same as the corresponding category of mestiço in Brazil.

In spite of these differences, the construction of race in Latin America can be contrasted with concepts of race and ethnicity in the United States. The ethno-racial composition of modern-day Latin American nations combines diverse Indigenous American populations, with influence from Iberian and other Western European colonizers, and equally diverse African groups brought to the Americas as slave labor, and also recent immigrant groups from all over the world.

Racial categories in Latin America are often linked to both continental ancestry or mixture as inferred from phenotypical traits, but also to socio-economic status. Ethnicity is often constructed either as an amalgam national identity or as something reserved for the indigenous groups so that ethnic identity is something that members of indigenous groups have in addition to their national identity.

Racial and ethnic discrimination is common in Latin America where socio-economic status generally correlates with perceived whiteness, while indigenous status and perceived African ancestry is generally correlated with poverty, and lack of opportunity and social status.

== Concepts of race and ethnicity ==
In Latin American concepts of race, physiological traits are often combined with social traits such as socio-economic status, so that a person is categorized not only according to physical phenotype but also social standing. Ethnicity on the other hand is a system that classifies groups of people according to cultural, linguistic and historic criteria. An ethnic group is normally defined by having a degree of cultural and linguistic similarity and often an ideology of shared roots. Another difference between race and ethnicity is that race is usually conceptualized as a system of categorization where membership is limited to one category and is externally ascribed by other who are not members of that category without regards to the individuals own feeling of membership. Whereas ethnicity is often seen as a system of social organization where membership is established through mutual identification between a group and its members.

The construction of race in Latin America is different from, for example, the model found in the United States, possibly because race mixing has been a common practice since the early colonial period, whereas in the United States it has generally been avoided or severely sanctioned. Moreover, phenotypical appearance determines racial classification more than strict ancestry.

Blanqueamiento

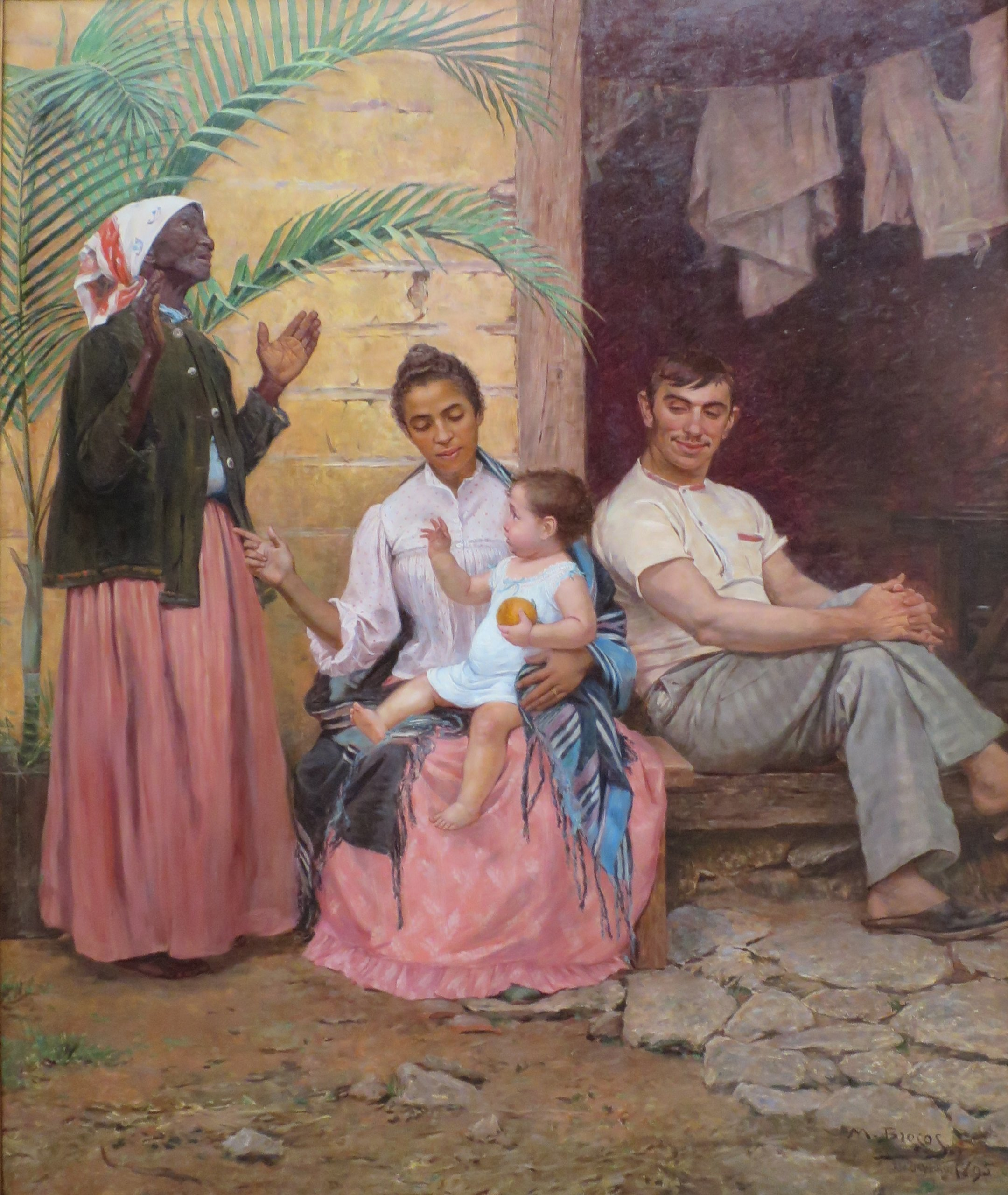
A Redenção de Cam (Redemption of Ham), by Galician painter Modesto Brocos, 1895, Museu Nacional de Belas Artes, Brazil. The painting depicts a black grandmother, mulatta mother, white father and their quadroon child, hence three generations of racial hypergamy through whitening.

Blanqueamiento, or whitening, is a social, political, and economic practice used to "improve" the race (mejorar la raza) towards whiteness. The term blanqueamiento is rooted in Latin America and is used more or less synonymous with racial whitening. However, blanqueamiento can be considered in both the symbolic and biological sense Symbolically, blanqueamiento represents an ideology that emerged from legacies of European colonialism, described by Anibal Quijano's theory of coloniality of power, which caters to white dominance in social hierarchies Biologically, blanqueamiento is the process of whitening by marrying a lighter skinned individual in order to produce lighter-skinned offspring.

Blanqueamiento was enacted in national policies of many Latin American countries, particularly Brazil, Venezuela and Cuba, at the turn of the 20th century. In most cases, these policies promoted European immigration as a means to whiten the population.

Mestizaje

An important phenomenon described for some parts of Latin America is "Whitening" or "Mestizaje" describing the policy of planned racial mixing with the purpose of minimizing the non-white part of the population. This practice was possible as in these countries one is classified as white even with very few white phenotypical traits and it has meant that the percentages of people identifying as fully black or indigenous has decreased over the course of the twentieth century as the mixed class expanded. It has also meant that the racial categories have been fluid. Unlike the United States where ancestry is used to define race, Latin American scholars came to agree by the 1970s that race in Latin America could not be understood as the “genetic composition of individuals” but instead “based upon a combination of cultural, social, and somatic considerations. In Latin America, a person's ancestry is quite irrelevant to racial classification. For example, full-blooded siblings can often be classified by different races (Harris 1964).

== North and Central America ==
=== Mexico ===
==== Racial and ethnic ideologies ====
Ethnoracial groups in Mexico (2020 census)
1. Undeclared (78.5%)
2. Indigenous (19.4%)
3. Blacks (2.04%)

Very generally speaking ethno-racial relations can be arranged on an axis between the two extremes of European and Indigenous American cultural and biological heritage, this is a remnant of the colonial Spanish caste system which categorized individuals according to their perceived level of biological mixture between the two groups. Additionally the presence of considerable portions of the population with partly African and Asian heritage further complicates the situation. Even though it still arranges persons along the line between indigenous and European, in practice the classificatory system is no longer biologically based, but rather mixes socio-cultural traits with phenotypical traits, and classification is largely fluid, allowing individuals to move between categories and define their ethnic and racial identities situationally.

Generally, it can be said that in scholarship, as well as popular discourse, there has been a tendency of talking about indigenous peoples in terms of ethnicity, about Afro-minorities and white socio-economic privilege in terms of race, and about mestizos in terms of national identity. It is now however becoming recognized that processes of identity formation and social stratification in regards to all population groups in Mexico can be analyzed both in terms of race and of ethnicity.

==== Racial and ethnical terms ====
Mestizaje

In Mexico's post-revolutionary period, Mestizaje was a racial ideology that combined elements of the Euro-American ideologies of the racial superiority of the "white race" with the social reality of a postcolonial, multiracial setting. It promoted the use of planned miscegenation as a eugenic strategy designed (in their conception) to improve the overall quality of the population by multiplying white genetic material to the entire population. This ideology was very different from the way the eugenics debate was carried out in Europe and North America, where racial "purity" and anti-miscegenation legislation was the eugenic strategy of choice. The ideology of Mestizaje came from the long tradition of tolerance of racial mixing that existed in the Spanish colonies.

The ideology was also a part of the strategy of forging a national identity to serve as the basis of a modern nation state, and for this reason mestizaje also became a way of fusing disparate cultural identities into a single national ethnicity.

The ideology was influently worded by José Vasconcelos who in his La Raza Cósmica formulated a vision of how a "race of the future" would be created by mixing the mongoloid, negroid, and caucasian races. As the place where this mixing was already well underway, Mexico, and Latin America in general, was the center of the creation of this new and improved species of human beings, the mestizo.

Mestizos

The large majority of Mexicans classify themselves as "Mestizos", meaning that they neither identify fully with any indigenous culture or with a particular non-Mexican heritage, but rather identify as having cultural traits and heritage that is mixed by elements from indigenous and European traditions. By the deliberate efforts of post-revolutionary governments the "Mestizo identity" was constructed as the base of the modern Mexican national identity, through a process of cultural synthesis referred to as mestizaje. Mexican politicians and reformers such as José Vasconcelos and Manuel Gamio were instrumental in building a Mexican national identity on the concept of mestizaje (see the section below).

The term "Mestizo" is not in wide use in Mexican society today and has been dropped as a category in population censuses, it is however still used in social and cultural studies when referring to the non-indigenous part of the Mexican population. The word has somewhat pejorative connotations and most of the Mexican citizens who would be defined as mestizos in the sociological literature would probably self-identify primarily as Mexicans. In the Yucatán peninsula, the word Mestizo is even used about Maya speaking populations living in traditional communities, because during the Caste War of the late 19th century those Maya who did not join the rebellion were classified as mestizos. In Chiapas the word "Ladino" is used instead of mestizo.

Sometimes, particularly outside of Mexico, the word "mestizo" is used with the meaning of a person with mixed indigenous and European blood. This usage does not conform to the Mexican social reality where, like in Brazil, a person of mostly indigenous genetic heritage would be considered Mestizo either by rejecting his indigenous culture or by not speaking an indigenous language, and a person with a very low percentage of indigenous genetic heritage would be considered fully indigenous either by speaking an indigenous language or by identifying with a particular indigenous cultural heritage. Additionally the categories carry additional meanings having to do with social class so that the term indigena or the more pejorative "indio" (Indian) is connected with ideas of low social class, poverty, rural background, superstition, being dominated by traditional values as opposed to reason. Commonly, instead of the term Mestizo, which also has a somewhat pejorative usage, the term "gente de razón" ("people of reason") is used and contrasted with "gente de costumbre" ("people of tradition"), cementing the status of indigeneity being connected to superstition and backwardness. For example, it has been observed that upwards social mobility is generally correlated with "whitening", if persons with indigenous biological and cultural roots rise to positions of power and prestige they tend to be viewed as more "white" than if they belonged to a lower social class.

Indigenous groups Prior to contact with Europeans the indigenous peoples of Mexico had not had any kind of shared identity. Indigenous identity was constructed by the dominant Euro-Mestizo majority and imposed upon the indigenous people as a negatively defined identity, characterized by the lack of assimilation into modern Mexico. Indian identity therefore became socially stigmatizing. Cultural policies in early post-revolutionary Mexico were paternalistic towards the indigenous people, with efforts designed to "help" indigenous peoples achieve the same level of progress as the rest of society, eventually assimilating indigenous peoples completely to Mestizo Mexican culture, working toward the goal of eventually solving the "indian problem" by transforming indigenous communities into mestizo communities .

The category of "indígena" (indigenous) is a modern term in Spanish America for those termed Indios ("Indians") in the colonial era. They can be defined narrowly according to linguistic criteria including only persons that speak one of Mexico's 62 indigenous languages, this is the categorization used by the National Mexican Institute of Statistics. It can also be defined broadly to include all persons who self-identify as having an indigenous cultural background, whether or not they speak the language of the indigenous group they identify with. This means that the percentage of the Mexican population defined as "indigenous" varies according to the definition applied, cultural activists have referred to the usage of the narrow definition of the term for census purposes as "statistical genocide".

== Caribbean ==
=== Cuba ===
Racial groups in Cuba (2012 census)
1. Whites (64.1%)
2. Mulattos (26.6%)
3. Blacks (9.26%)

In Cuba, people are defined as either “blanco” (white, that is, of European descent), “negro” (black, that is, of Sub-Saharan African descent) or “mulatto” (of mixed African and European descent).

“Jaba'o” or “Jabado” is a term used to describe people of European and African descent with light afro hair, pale skin and some African features. “Trigueño” is used to refer to Cubans of European ancestry who otherwise have a tan and darker Mediterranean complexion such as dark brown-black hair, dark brown eyes and for men with heavier beards, likely stemming from the significant Canarian (thus part North African) genetic ancestry in Cubans.

== South America ==
=== Brazil ===
==== Racial and ethnical ideologies ====
Ethnoracial groups in Brazil (2022 census)
1. Pardos (mixed) (45.3%)
2. Whites (43.5%)
3. Blacks (10.2%)
4. Indigenous (0.60%)
5. East Asians (0.42%)

Brazilian ancestry has contributions from native Brazilian, Portuguese or other European, Asian and African populations.

==== Racial and ethnical terms ====
The five racial categories in which the Brazilian Institute of Geography and Statistic has for the population is Branco, Pardo, Preto, Amarelo, and Indigena. Furthermore, Brazil has three different systems for racial classification. These systems are dependent on a white to black spectrum.

- Brazilian Institute of Geography and Statistics First Racial System in the Brazilian Census: branco, pardo, preto, amarela, indigena.
- Brazilian Institute of Geography and Statisticts Second Racial System in the Brazilian Census: Inspired by a census of open ended question. Acquired similar but more specific racial terms.
- Brazilian Institute of Geography and Statisticts Third Racial System is the Black Movement: pardos and pretos and negros. Afro descendant is a term that is getting brought more to use by this movement.

Terms	Meaning
Caboclo	
Moreno	Tan or Olive Complexion
Moreno Claro	Light Tan or Olive Complexion
Mulato	
Negro	Black
Brazilian Institute of Geography and Statistic First Racial System/Terms
Amarelo	Means yellow, relates to Asian individuals
Branco	
Indigena	
Pardo	
Preto	
Brazilian Institute of Geography and Statistic Second Racial System/Terms
Amarela	
Branco	
Clara	
Moreno	used to distinguish blonde or lighter hair individuals from darker but is commonly used for people with olive complexions whom commonly have dark hair.
Moreno Claro	
Moreno Oscura	
Mulata	
Negro	
Palido	Pale
Pardo	
Preto	
Brazilian Institute of Geography and Statistic Second Racial System/Terms
Negro	
Pardo	
Preto	
Afro descendente	

=== Colombia ===
==== Racial and ethnical ideologies ====
Ethnoracial groups in Colombia (2018 census)
1. Undeclared (85.0%)
2. Blacks (9.34%)
3. Indigenous (4.31%)
4. Romanis (0.01%)
5. Not Stated (1.35%)

Colombian government acknowledges three ethnic minority groups: Afro Colombians, Indigenous, and Romani. In difference, the non-ethnic population are mestizos and whites, who make up 86% of the Colombian population in the 2005 census.

Mestizos and whites live in urban areas, mainly in the Andean highlands.

Afro Colombians (Black, Zambo, and Mulattoes) are near the coastal areas and in Cauca and Magdalena rivers. Raizales inhabit Archipielago of San Andres and they keep their British influences through the practice of Protestantism, and English based creole language use.

==== Racial and ethnical terms ====
Terms	Meaning
Afro Colombians	From full or partial African origin
Blacks	
Cachacos	From inner Colombia
Castizos	
Costeños	From Caribbean region
Indígenas	
Llaneros	From Eastern Plains
Mestizos	Indigenous American and Spanish mixed
Mulatos	
Paisas	From Medellin, central Antioquia or Coffe Axis
Palenqueros	Descendants of the slave former slave community of the village of Palenque de San Basilio.
Pastusos	From Pasto and its hinterland
Raizales	
Rolos	From Bogota
Whites	
Zambos	

Indigenous groups

The Indigenous American population in Colombia as of 2005 is 4.3 million people or 3.4% of the population. Despite a small population, this community has a large self-government within Colombian municipalities. In fact almost 25% of the country's land titles have been regained by the indigenous population.

=== Ecuador ===
==== Racial and ethnical ideologies ====
Ethnoracial groups in Ecuador (2022 census)
1. Mestizos (85.2%)
2. Indigenous (7.69%)
3. Blacks (4.81%)
4. Whites (2.21%)
5. Others (0.12%)

Indigenous, Afro descendants, and Spanish descendants make up the ethno-racial groups in Ecuador. Ethnic identification is dependent on phenotypes though there is a tendency to identify as Mestizo.

El Hombre Ecuatoriano: "The Ecuadorian Man" Mejorar La Raza: "Improve the Race"

There is a nationalization effort in Ecuador to homogenize the country's ethnicity. Nonetheless, a great focus on white supremacy can be seen behind this effort which is negates the effort of "inclusion" as per this nationalization effort.

==== Racial and ethnic terms ====
Ambiguous Phenotype/Mestizaje
Mestizos
Cholos
Montubio/Montuvios
Black Ecuadorians
Negro
Zambo
Moreno
Andean Quechua Speakers
Indio
Longo
Indigena
Nativos
Runa
Amazonian indigenous people
Indio
Indigena
Native
Ribereños
Selvatico
Salvajes
Other terms
Costeños (from Coast)
Serranos (from Highlands)
Criollos
Peninsulares

Indigenous groups

The indigenous individuals of Ecuador are descendant of the Inca Empire. The Inca empire imposed their culture and Quechua language to diverse indigenous cultures that had already been in the Guayas river basin in the early 10th century BC. Another indigenous group within Ecuador are the Amazonians who are the most isolated.

The "Levantamientos"

Indigenous people uprising in response to disenfranchisement. The Levantamiento Indigena called for Ecuador to be classified as a plurination, agrarian redistribution, and validation of former indigenous lands. This all was through the formation of the Confederation of Indigenous Nationalities of Ecuador, CONAIE.

List of indigenous nations represented by CONAIE:

- Highland Kichwa
- Eastern Amazonian Kichwa
- Achuar
- Cofan
- Huaorani
- Secoya
- Shuar
- Siona
- Zapara
- Awa
- Chachi
- Espera
- Mata
- Tsachila
- Wankavilka

=== Peru ===
Ethnoracial groups in Peru (2017 census)
1. Mestizos (60.2%)
2. Indigenous (25.8%)
3. Whites (5.89%)
4. Blacks (3.57%)
5. East Asians (0.16%)
6. Others (4.42%)

Peru is a highly multicultural country, with a history of Indigenous, European, African, and East Asian communities. Race and ethnicity in Peru are fluid and based in complex social stratification. In colonial Peru, a non-White person could become a Mestizo through education and cultural assimilation (referred to as "acriollamiento"); in this way, mestizaje offered social mobility that was previously inaccessible to Indigenous and Afro-Peruvians, while also enabling the cultural erasure of various non-White communities. In modern Peru, racial/ethnic identity does not necessarily reflect ancestry or individual phenotypes; instead, it is a manifestation of socio-economic position, cultural affiliation, and geography.

In the 2017 national census, the Peruvian Government reported ethnicity according to an individual's first language and their own self-identification. This approach reflects the multifaceted nature of ethnicity in Peru, which is influenced by genetic ancestry, language(s) spoken, geographic location, and cultural affiliation. According to the results of the 2017 Peruvian National Census, the majority of the population identified as Mestizo (60.2%), followed by Quechua (22.3%), White (5.9%), Black/Afro-descended (3.6%), and Aymara (2.4%). Smaller ethnic communities included various Amazonian Indigenous peoples (e.g., the Ashaninka, Awajun, Shipibo Konibo, and other Indigenous peoples), Nikkei (i.e., Peruvians of Japanese ancestry; 0.1% of the total population), and Tusan (Peruvians of Chinese ancestry; 0.1% of the total population). 3.3% of the population declined to answer, and 1.1% answered "other".

==== Race and inequality in Peru ====
Mestizo Peruvians primarily live in urban areas, while Indigenous Peruvians (referred to as pueblos indígenas/originarios in Spanish) tend to live in rural areas. This pattern contributes to the difficulties faced by Indigenous Peruvians, including lack of access to education, healthcare, and employment. Racism continues to be a significant and pervasive issue within Peruvian society, manifesting both informally and at structural levels. Indigenous Peruvians and Afro-Peruvians are particularly impacted by racism in Peru. Recent manifestations of racism within Peru include, but are not limited to, the targeting of Indigenous communities and protestors by the Peruvian Government, the forced sterilization of over 300,000 Indigenous Peruvian women during the Fujimori regime, and the ongoing negative stereotypes of Indigenous and Afro-Peruvians.

==== Ethnic groups in Peru ====
Some of Peru's largest racial/ethnic groups include:

- Mestizos (60.2%): mixed-race Peruvians without cultural or linguistic affiliations to any Indigenous group.
- Quechua (Runakuna) (22.3%): Indigenous Peruvians belonging to the Quechua people, one of the largest Indigenous groups in the Americas, and located in the Peruvian Andes.
- White Peruvians (5.9%): Peruvians with primarily European ancestry.
- Afro-Peruvians (3.6%): Black Peruvians descended from West African slaves brought to Peru during the colonial era.
- Aymara (2.4%): Indigenous Peruvians belonging to the Aymara people. The Aymara make up Peru's second largest Indigenous group, and live in the altiplano region.
- Nikkei (0.1%): Peruvians with Japanese ancestry.
- Tusan (0.1%): Peruvians with Chinese ancestry.
- Amazonians: Indigenous Peruvians belonging to one of the 51 Indigenous groups located in the Peruvian Amazon, including the Ashaninka, Awajun, and Shipibo Konibo.

== See also ==
- Casta
- Ethnic groups in Latin America

== Sources ==
- Knight, Alan. 1990. "Racism, Revolution and indigenismo: Mexico 1910–1940". Chapter 4 in The Idea of Race in Latin America, 1870–1940. Richard Graham (ed.) pp. 71–113.
- Wade, Peter. 1997. Race and Ethnicity in Latin America. Pluto Press.
- Bartolomé, Miguel Alberto. (1996) "Pluralismo cultural y redefinicion del estado en México". in Coloquio sobre derechos indígenas, Oaxaca, IOC.
- Friedlander, Judith. 1975. Being Indian in Hueyapan: A Study of Forced Identity in Contemporary Mexico. New York: Saint Martin's Press.
- von Vacano, Diego. 2011. The Color of Citizenship: Race, Modernity and Latin American/Hispanic Political Thought (Oxford University Press).
- Leibsohn, Dana, and Barbara E. Mundy, "Reckoning with Mestizaje", Vistas: Visual Culture in Spanish America, 1520–1820 (2015). http://www.fordham.edu/vistas.
