= La raza cósmica =

Non-fiction book by José Vasconcelos

La Raza Cosmica
- Author: José Vasconcelos
- Language: Spanish
- Subject: Psychology
- Published: 1925
- Publication place: Mexico
- Pages: 164

La raza cósmica (The Cosmic Race) is a Spanish-language book written and published in 1925 by Mexican philosopher, secretary of education, and 1929 presidential candidate José Vasconcelos to express the ideology of a future "fifth race" in the Americas; an agglomeration of all the races in the world with no respect to color or number to erect a new civilization: Universópolis.

Claiming that social Darwinist and racialist ideologies are only created to validate, explain, and justify ethnic superiority and to repress others, Vasconcelos attempts to refute these theories and goes on to recognize his words as being an ideological effort to improve the cultural morale of a "depressed race" by offering his optimistic theory of the future development of a cosmic race.

As he explains in his literary work, armies of people would then go forth around the world professing their knowledge. Vasconcelos continues to say that the people of the Iberian regions of the Americas (that is to say, the parts of the continent colonised by Portugal and Spain) have the territorial, racial, and spiritual factors necessary to initiate the "universal era of humanity".

== Critiques ==
The ideas put forth in La raza cósmica are held to be rather controversial. For example, Celarent notes that many felt that the work and its author were exceedingly racist, such as when Vasconcelos' wrote "the Chinese, who under the holy counsel of Confucian morals multiply like rats."^{(p1000)}^{(p19)} However, when it was first written, Vasconcelos' piece was to be a reaction or refutation of Social Darwinism and biological racism, although Juárez suggests that Vasconcelos' may have added to Mexican Conservative thought by doing so.^{(p51)}

In order to refute the ideas of racial superiority, Vasconcelos conceptualized a fifth race, the cosmic race, something that is an agglomeration of all of the other races. As Palacios notes, this race is called cosmic as it suggests that humanity will become combined and reach its destiny as inferior traits are lost through synthesis and a new Spiritual Era is reached.^{(p420)} Juárez offers a critique to this concept against biological racism by suggesting that Vasconcelos reduced non-white races in order to uphold "Anglo-Saxon propaganda" and "Nordic educational, social and governmental systems."^{(p70)}

Another critique is offered by Palacios on the basis that while Vasconcelos did not support so-called "negative eugenics" or Social Darwinism, he did advocate for a "eugenics of aesthetics." Palacios describes eugenics of aesthetics as a survival of the beautiful, as compared to Darwin's survival of the fittest.^{(p422)} Palacios suggests that this viewpoint alongside other comments made by Vasconcelos show that he held some races as better than others.^{(p422)}

Vasconcelos's enumeration of La Raza Cósmica as the "new" fifth race presupposes early twentieth century North‐western Quadrisphere racial beliefs that the first four races were Sub-Saharan African\Black, Amerindian\Red, Chinese East Asian\Yellow, and European Caucasian\White; which notably leaves no room for South Indian Dravidians nor for people indigenous to the South‐eastern Quadrisphere—Aboriginal Australians, Malayo‐Polynesians, and Melanesians—possibly not even for ASEANs.

== Usage of phrase ==
The title La raza cósmica embodies the notion that traditional, exclusive concepts of so-called "race" and nationality can be transcended in the name of humanity's common destiny. It originally referred to a movement by Mexican intellectuals during the 1920s who pointed out that so-called "Latin" Americans have the blood of all the world's so-called "races": European, Indigenous Native Americans, and Africans, thereby transcending the peoples of the "Old World".

This notion of a "fifth race" is contrasted with the assimilationist conceptualizations of race that were more characteristic of portions of the Americas settled by peoples of Germanic origins. Latin America, with deeply complex urban centers and social life, came to be colonized by hispanic peoples whose consciousness had long been within a romanized sphere of influence. Assimilation was not achieved by imposing uniformity or the explicit campaigns of mass-erasure as much of North America pursued, seen in notions of racial purity or the "One-Drop rule". Rather, hierarchies were extended onto a new configuration - evoking Roman logic - through the continuous reshaping of diverse elements into a new, hybrid formation.

Vasconcelos also alluded to the term when he coined the National Autonomous University of Mexico's motto: "Por mi raza hablará el espíritu" ('Through my race the spirit will speak').

=== Contemporary usage ===
Contemporarily La raza cósmica has become about mestizaje (racial mixture) and mestizos/Métis rather than the creation of the cosmic race. Palacios describes how the Chicano movement appropriated and transformed the ideas of Vasconcelos' fifth race into that of Mexican national thought, focusing on the words from a poem by Alurista, "a bronze people [an ethnic alloy] with a bronze culture [an alloy of traditions]."^{(p428)} Palacios also gives the example of Valdez, a Chicano writer, who focused on trying to create a society that was less Eurocentric or Western rather than following Vasconcelos' idea to evolve the Indigenous and mixed into something better.^{(p430)}

Mestizaje as the contemporary notion of cosmic race is shown in The Land of the Cosmic Race by Christina A. Sue. King and Moras give an overview of this piece and claim that Mexico has been re-founded on 3 pillars: mestizaje, non-racism, and non-blackness.^{(p249)}^{(p956)} They claim mestizaje is the new cultural identity of Mexico; non-racism is applied through this fact, as a place can't be racist if everyone is a mestizo (mixed race); and non-blackness is the removal of blackness from the culture, as a race category, and from the make-up of mestizos.^{(249)} Both King and Moras note that Sue suggests that the removal of blackness allows the population focus on uplifting their Mexican identity, which she claims has more basis in whiteness.^{(249-50)}^{(p457)}

== See also ==
- Race and ethnicity in Latin America
- Race of the Future
- Racial democracy
- Postracialism
- Chicano
- Mixed Race Day
- Hispanic
- Latin America
- La Raza
