= La Raza =

Race philosophy

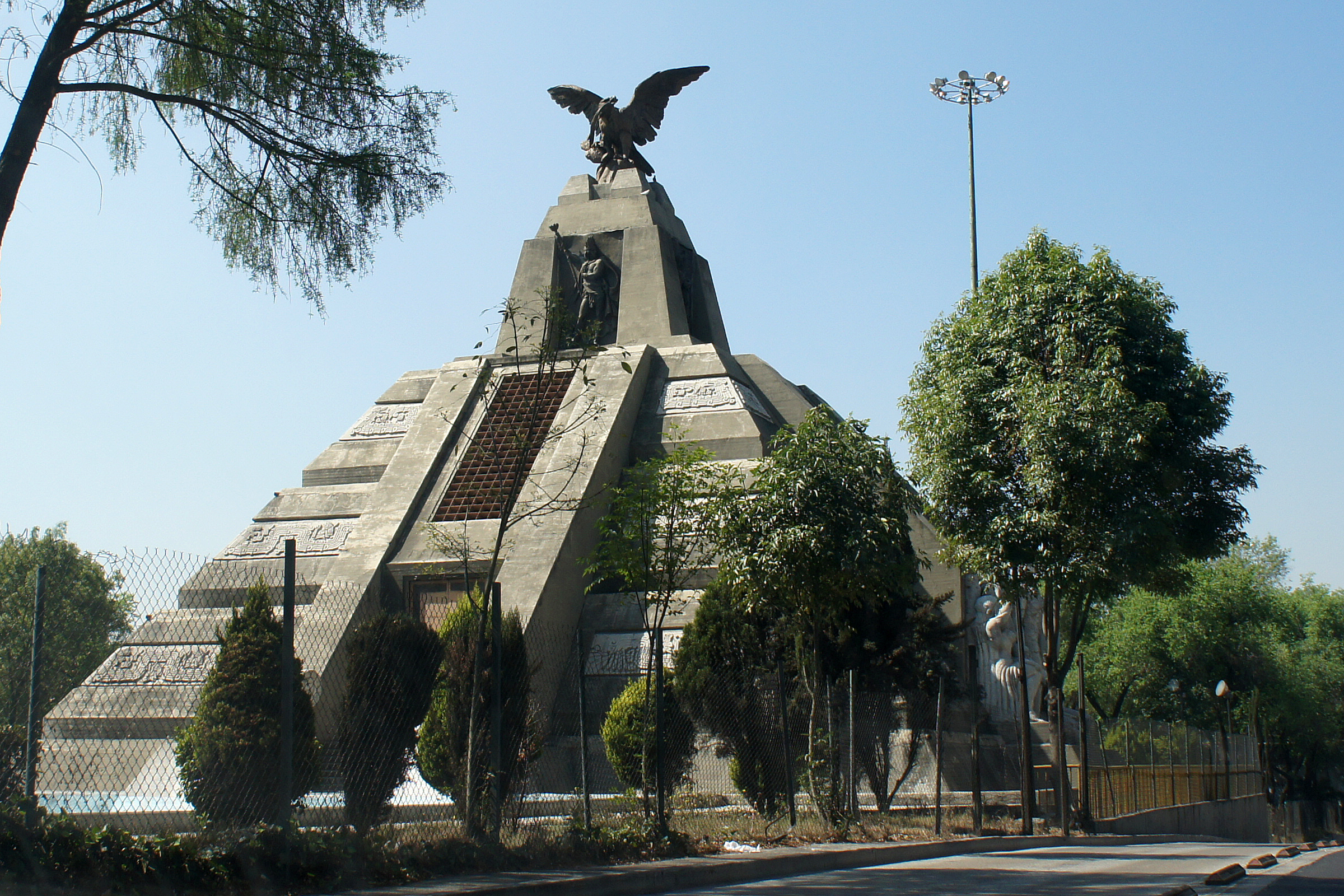
The Monumento a La Raza at Avenida de los Insurgentes, Mexico City (inaugurated 12 October 1940)

Flag of the Hispanic People

In Mexico, the Spanish expression la Raza ('the people'; literally: 'the race') has historically been used to refer to the mixed-race populations (primarily though not always exclusively in the Western Hemisphere), considered as an ethnic or racial unit historically deriving from the Spanish Empire, and the process of racial intermixing during the Spanish colonization of the Americas with the Indigenous populations of the Americas.

The term was not widely used in Hispanic America in the early-to-mid-20th century but has been redefined and reclaimed in Chicanismo and the United Farm Worker organization since 1968. It still remains in active use specifically in the context of Mexican-American identity politics in the United States. This terminology for mixed-race originated as a reference to "La Raza Cosmica" by José Vasconcelos, although it is no longer used in this context or associated with "La Raza Cosmica" ideology by Mexican-American, Native rights movements and activists in the United States.

== History ==
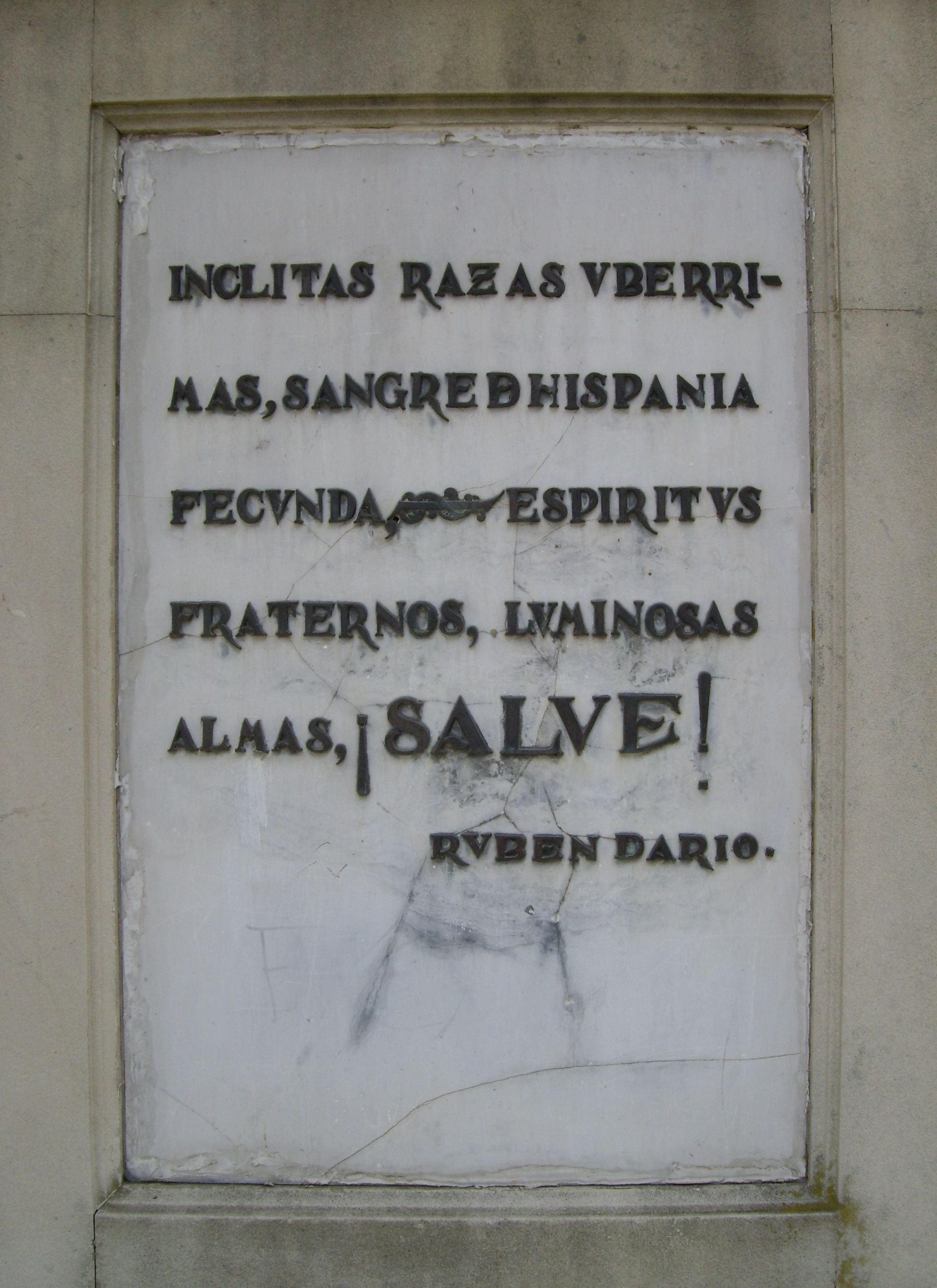
Text by Rubén Darío ("Salutación del optimista", 1905) inscribed on the Monumento a la Raza in Seville (1929). Translation: 'Illustrious, most fruitful races, fecund blood of Hispania, fraternal spirits, lumious souls, greetings!'

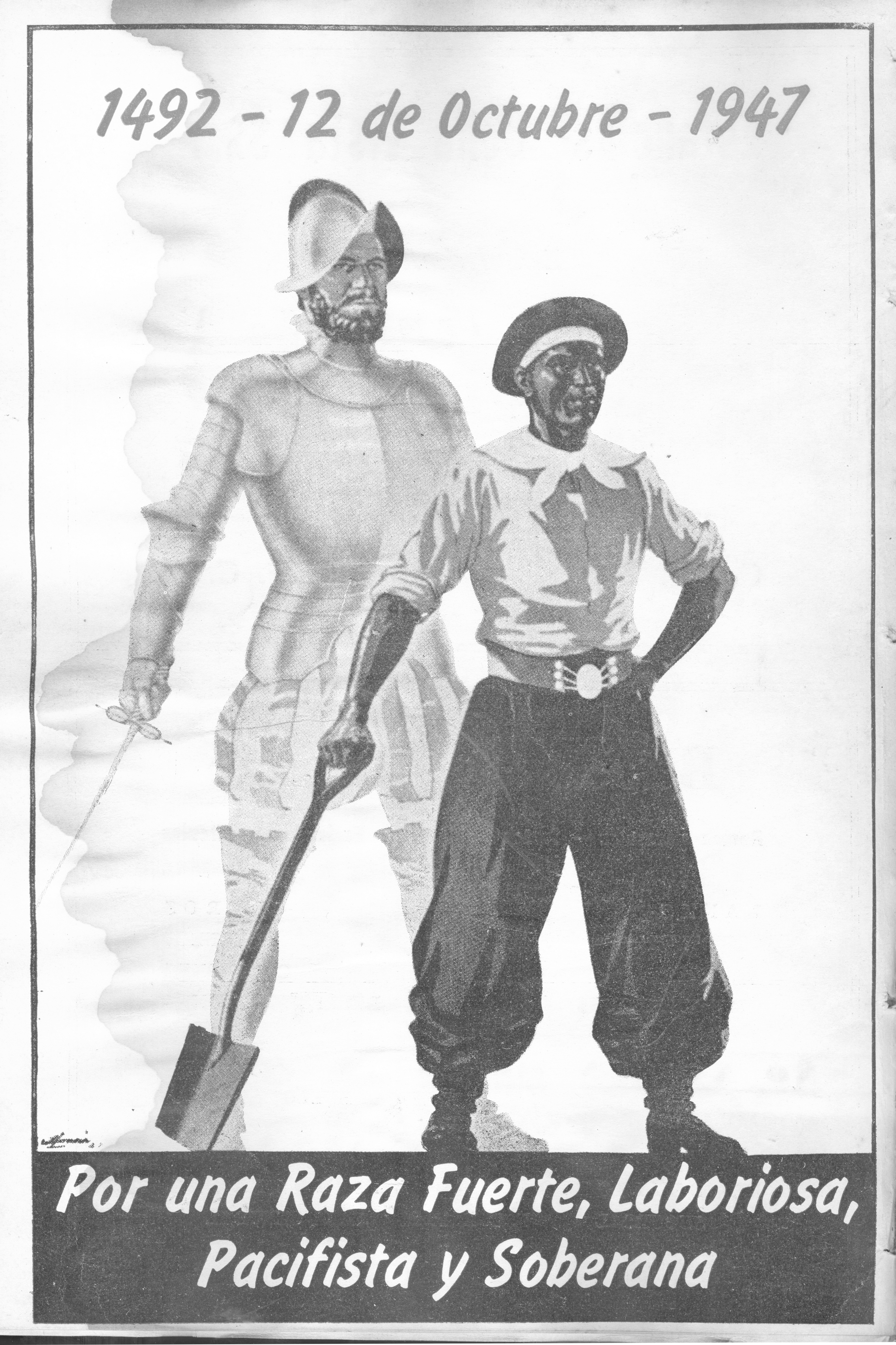
Propaganda poster by the Argentine government (1947) advocating a "strong, industrious, peaceful and sovereign race".

The term la raza was in use by 1858 in local California newspapers such as El Clamor Publico by californios writing about America latina and latinoamerica (Latin America), and identifying as latinos as the abbreviated term for their hemispheric membership in a Latin race la raza.

The shortened name of Día de la Raza (now often, though not always, with a capitalized R) was used in 1939, when the feast day was celebrated in Zaragoza in combination with a special devotion to the Virgen del Pilar (Our Lady of the Pillar). Chilean foreign vice-secretary Germán Vergara Donoso commented that the "profound significance of the celebration was the intimate inter-penetration of the homage to the Race and the devotion to Our Lady of the Pillar, i.e. the symbol of the ever more extensive union between America and Spain."

Spanish dictator Francisco Franco wrote a novel under the pen name "Jaime de Andrade" which was turned into the film Raza of 1942. It celebrates idealized "Spanish national qualities", and exemplifies this usage of raza española as referring specifically to Spanish Roman Catholic heritage. The Monumento a la Raza was inaugurated in Mexico City in 1940. La Raza metro station in Mexico City was inaugurated in 1978.

The term Chicano (feminine Chicana) likewise arose in the early 20th century as a designation of Mexicans. In the 1960s to 1970s, the term became associated with the Chicano Movement in relation to Mexican-American identity politics activism. In the United States, the terms la Raza and Chicano subsequently became closely associated. Various Hispanic groups in the United States still use the term. The Raza Unida Party was active as a political party representing Mexican-American racial identity politics in the 1970s. The Hispanic advocacy organization National Council of La Raza was formed in 1968 (renamed to UnidosUS in 2017).

La Raza was the name of a Chicano community newspaper edited by Eliezer Risco in 1968. Risco was one of the "LA Thirteen", a group of young Mexican-American men who were political activists identified by the government as being leaders of a Brown Power movement in Los Angeles. Raul Ruiz joined the staff of La Raza while a student at California State University, Los Angeles. Other community newspapers of the time were Inside Eastside and Chicano Student Movement. Ruiz, a key journalist in the movement, eventually became the editor of La Raza. It became the most influential Chicano-movement publication in southern California. The publications filled a void: for the most part, there had heretofore been no media coverage of any type for the Brown Power movement and its activities. The movement's own print-media publications were really the only forum that the Brown Power movement had to keep party members informed about what was going on in the movement across the Los Angeles area. The lack of the mainstream media coverage contributed to silencing the movement and its activities, unlike with the Black Power movement; the latter received much more coverage, which contributed to that movement's success in spreading their message and growing their movement.

== See also ==
- Casta
- Clash of Civilizations
- Latinidad
- Pan-Latinism
- Race and ethnicity in Latin America
- Race and ethnicity in the United States
- Racial politics
- La raza cósmica
- Panhispanism
