= List of Surrealist poets =

This is a list of Surrealist poets, known for writing material within the Surrealist cultural movement that began in the early 1920s.

== Surrealist poets ==
- Will Alexander (born 1948) - American Surrealist poet, novelist, essayist, playwright
- Louis Aragon (1897–1982) - French poet who co-founded the surrealist review Littérature
- Braulio Arenas (1913–1988) - Chilean poet and writer, founder of the surrealist Mandrágora group
- Antonin Artaud (1896–1948) - French poet, essayist, and dramatist who created the "Theatre of Cruelty"
- André Breton (1896–1966) - French poet and writer known as the leader and principal theorist of surrealism
- Jorge Cáceres (1923–1949) - Chilean poet and artist, a member of La Mandrágora, a Chilean Surrealist group
- Garrett Caples (born 1972) - American poet and former music and arts journalist
- Aimé Césaire (1913–2008) - French and Martinican Surrealist poet and a founder of the Negritude movement
- Teofilo Cid (1914–1964) - Chilean poet, member of La Mandrágora surrealist group
- Andrei Codrescu (born 1946) - Romanian-American poet, novelist, screenwriter, NPR commentator
- René Crevel (1900–1935) - French writer
- René Daumal (1908–1944) - French spiritual para-surrealist writer and poet
- Robert Desnos (1900–1945) - French poet and member of the French resistance against the Nazis
- Paul Éluard (1895–1952) - French poet
- Andreas Embirikos (1901–1975) - Greek poet and psychoanalyst
- Nikos Engonopoulos (1907–1985) - Greek poet and painter
- David Gascoyne (1916–2001) - English poet and translator
- Enrique Gómez Correa (1915–1995) - Chilean poet, lawyer and diplomat
- Andrew Joron – American poet, three-time winner of the Rhysling Award
- George Kalamaras - American poet and professor, former poet laureate of Indiana
- Noelle Kocot (born 1969) - American poet
- Philip Lamantia (1927–2005) - American poet and educator
- Michel Leiris (1901–1990) - French writer
- Mary Stanley Low (1912–2007) - British-Cuban surrealist poet, artist and Latin teacher
- Joyce Mansour (1928–1986) - Egyptian-French author and poet
- Ciaran O'Driscoll (born 1943) - Irish surrealist poet
- John Olson (born 1947) - American Surrealist poet and novelist
- Valentine Penrose (1898–1978) - French surrealist poet, author, and collagist
- Benjamin Péret (1899–1959) - French poet and a founder of the French Surrealist movement
- Alejandra Pizarnik (1936-1972) - Argentinian poet
- Gisèle Prassinos (1920–2015) - French writer
- Franklin Rosemont (1943–2009) - American poet, artist, historian, street speaker, and co-founder of the Chicago Surrealist Group
- Penelope Rosemont (born 1942) - American visual artists, writer, publisher, and social activist
- Tomaž Šalamun (1941–2014) - Slovenian surrealist poet
- Philippe Soupault (1897–1990) - French writer and poet, novelist, critic, and political activist
- James Tate (1943–2015) - American Surrealist poet and Pulitzer Prize winner
- Tristan Tzara (1896–1963) - Romanian French avant-garde poet, essayist and performance artist
- César Vallejo (1892–1938) - Peruvian poet, writer, playwright, and journalist
- Jeffrey Cyphers Wright (born 1951) - American poet and critic
- Kansuke Yamamoto (1914–1987) – Japanese poet and photographer; promoted Surrealist and avant-garde ideas in Japan through his poetry and photographs.
- John Yau (born 1950) - American poet and critic
- Dean Young (1955–2022) - American poet and poet-laureate for Texas in 2014

== See also ==
- Category:Surrealist poets
- Category:Surrealist writers
