= Gonzalo Rojas =

Chilean poet (1916–2011)

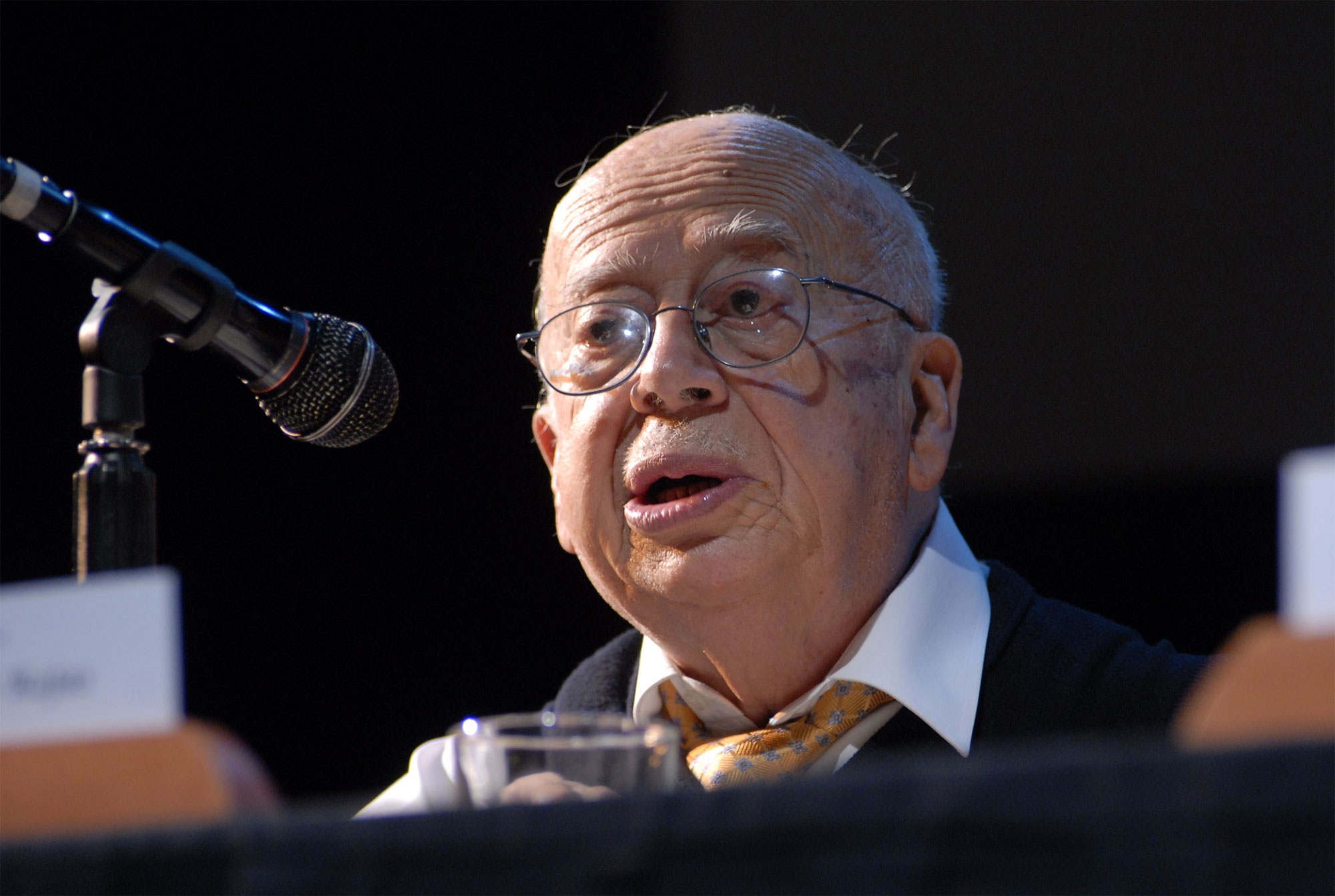
Gonzalo Rojas

Gonzalo Rojas Pizarro (December 20, 1916 – April 25, 2011) was a Chilean poet. His work is part of the continuing Latin American avant-garde literary tradition of the twentieth century. In 2003 he was awarded the Cervantes Prize.

== Life and career ==
He was the seventh son of a coal mining engineer, born in the port town of Lebu, Chile. Later on, during his youth he was the editor of the magazine Antarctica in Santiago de Chile and University lecturer in Valparaíso.

Between 1938 and 1941 he played a part in the surrealist group Mandrágora founded by Braulio Arenas, Teófilo Cid and Enrique Gómez Correa. Seven years later in 1948 his first book of poems was published in Santiago.

He studied law and literature in the Instituto Pedagógico de la Universidad de Chile. He taught in a number of small schools, even a German school in Valparaíso, but was eventually hired (1947) in the University of Chile in Valparaíso (now the University of Valparaíso). In 1952 having finally earned his degree, he was awarded a professorship at the University of Concepción. During the late 1950s and early 1960s, as the head of the Department of Spanish and later the director of summer courses, Gonzalo was instrumental in establishing a number of workshops that helped define earlier generations of Chilean writers and which brought international writers to Chile to participate in these events and congresses.

After the 1973 Chilean coup d'état he was forced to go into exile, an “undocumented person”. He was stripped of his diplomatic position and was also banned from teaching at any Chilean university. The University of Rostock in East Germany provided him with a placement.

He taught at universities in Germany, the United States, Spain, and Mexico.

Thanks to a Guggenheim Fellowship, Gonzalo Rojas went back to Chile in 1979, to Chillán, 400 kilometers to the south of the capital, to live permanently, yet was still unable to teach at a university there.

Subsequently, he lived in the United States between 1980 and 1994. From 1980 to 1985, Gonzalo was a visiting professor at Columbia University and the University of Chicago, then from 1985 to 1994, he held the title of professor at Brigham Young University.

He was awarded the Chilean National Prize for Literature and the Queen Sofia Prize of Iberian American Poetry (by the King of Spain), both in 1992. He also received the Octavio Paz prize of Mexico, and the José Hernández prize of Argentina. He was awarded the Cervantes Prize for 2003 the 23 of April 2004.

On the morning of April 25, 2011, Rojas died as a consequence of a stroke he suffered earlier in February. The government declared two days of official mourning. He was buried in Chillan, Chile. He was considered one of the greatest modern poets in Chile, together with Nicanor Parra.

His poetry has been translated into English, German, French, Portuguese, Russian, Italian, Romanian, Swedish, Chinese, Japanese, Turkish, Bengali and Greek.

== Selected works ==
- La miseria del hombre (1948)
- Contra la muerte (1964)
- Oscuro (1977)
- Transtierro (1979)
- Del relámpago (1981)
- 50 poemas (1982)
- El alumbrado (1986)
- Antología personal (1988)
- Materia de testamento (1988)
- Antología de aire (1991)
- Desocupado lector (1990)
- Las hermosas (1991), Zumbido (1991)
- Río turbio (1996)
- América es la casa y otros poemas (1998)
- Obra selecta (1999)
