= Oscar Palacio =

Colombian born Boston based photographer

Oscar Palacio (born 1970) is a Colombian born photographer and Boston-based artist whose photographic practice examines the American landscape as a site of layered memory, displacement, and historical reckoning. He earned his Bachelors of Architecture from the University of Miami in 1992, and an MFA in Photography from the Massachusetts College of Art and Design in 1998.

His photographs are held in major collections including the Harvard Art Museums, Yale University Art Gallery, and MIT List Visual Arts Center. He has exhibited widely, with solo shows at Harvard University's Center for American Political Studies (2019) and the Addison Gallery of American Art (2005), and in significant group exhibitions such as Devour the Land: War and American Landscape Photography since 1970(Harvard Art Museums, 2021–22).

In 2025, Palacio was the inaugural Artist-in-Residence at the University of Georgia's Lamar Dodd School of Art, where he developed Ghosts of the Oconee, an interdisciplinary project that explores the Oconee River as a palimpsest of Muscogee stewardship, enslaved labor, industrial exploitation, and ongoing displacement. Created in collaboration with historian Claudio Saunt, sociologist Jane McPhearson, poet Andrew Zawacki, Indigenous studies scholar James Anthony Owen, and ecologist Seth Werner, the project will be published as an artist book by the Georgia Museum of Art Press.

== Publications ==
- Palacio, Oscar. "Blue Velvet." In The Photographer's Playbook: 307 Assignments and Ideas, edited by Jason Fulford and Gregory Halpern, 262. New York: Aperture, 2014.
- Palacio, Oscar; Wells Liz. American Places. San Francisco: The Arts at California College of Integral Studies, 2013.
- Kemmerer, Allison. 2009. "Oscar Palacio." In Contact Sheet: The Light Work Annual, no. 152, 70–73. Syracuse, NY: Light Work.t
