= Brian Henry =

American writer

Brian Henry is an American poet, translator, editor, and literary critic.

== Biography ==
Henry completed a B.A. at the College of William & Mary and an MFA at the University of Massachusetts Amherst College of Humanities and Fine Arts.

He has published poetry in magazines including The American Poetry Review, The Paris Review, the Boston Review, and the Virginia Quarterly Review, and his work has been translated into Russian, Croatian, Serbian, and Slovenian. Henry's poetry criticism has appeared in the publications including The New York Times Book Review, The Times Literary Supplement, The Kenyon Review, The Georgia Review, and The Yale Review. His essays have been reprinted in such books as Imagining Australia (Harvard University Press).

In 2000, he and Matthew Zapruder co-founded Verse Press, which later became Wave Books in 2005.

Henry has translated Woods and Chalices (Harcourt, 2008) by the Slovenian poet Tomaž Šalamun and The Book of Things (BOA Editions, 2010) by the Slovenian poet Aleš Šteger. His translation of The Book of Things won the 2011 Best Translated Book Award. In 2019 he was a contributor to A New Divan: A Lyrical Dialogue between East and West (Gingko Library).

Henry has taught at Plymouth State University and the University of Georgia. He teaches creative writing and English at the University of Richmond. He lives in Richmond, Virginia.

== Books ==
- Astronaut (Arc Publications, 2000, ISBN 1-900072-33-5)
- American Incident (Salt Publishing, 2002, ISBN 978-1876857523)
- Graft (Arc Publications, 2002, ISBN 978-1900072731)
- On James Tate (editor, University of Michigan Press, 2004, ISBN 9780472113767)
- The Verse Book of Interviews (co-editor with Andrew Zawacki, Verse Press, 2005, ISBN 0974635359)
- Quarantine (Ahsahta Press, 2006, ISBN 978-0916272883)
- The Stripping Point (Counterpath Press, 2007, ISBN 9781933996011)
- In the Unlikely Event of a Water (Equipage, 2007, ISBN 9781900968171)
- Wings Without Birds (Salt Publishing, 2010, ISBN 978-1844717484)
- Lessness (Ahsahta Press, 2011, ISBN 978-1934103203)
- Doppelganger (Talisman House, 2011, ISBN 978-1-58498-084-1)
- Brother No One (Salt Publishing, 2013, ISBN 9781844719181)
- Static & Snow (Black Ocean Press, 2015, ISBN 978-1-939568-12-0)
- Permanent State (Threadsuns, 2020, ISBN 978-1734691108)

== Honors ==
- Fulbright Scholarship, 1997
- Finalist, Forward Prize for Best First Collection, Astronaut, 2000
- George Bogin Memorial Award from the Poetry Society of America, 2001
- Alice Fay di Castagnola Award from the Poetry Society of America, Quarantine, 2003
- Carole Weinstein Poetry Prize, 2006
- Cecil Hemley Memorial Award from the Poetry Society of America, "Moth Ark", 2008
- Nagrade Treći Trg, 2009
- Best Translated Book Award, Book of Things, 2011
- National Endowment for the Arts Translation Fellowship, 2020
