= W. W. E. Ross =

Canadian poet (1894–1966)

- Born: June 14, 1894; Peterborough, Ontario
- Died: August 26, 1966 (aged 72)
- Citizenship: British subject
- Spouse: Mary Lowrey Ross
- Children: Mary (Molly)Loretta, Nancy Helen
- Writing career
- Pen name: E.R.
- Notable works: Irrealities, Sonnets & Laconics

William Wrighton Eustace Ross [often misspelt William Wrightson Eustace Ross] (June 14, 1894 – August 26, 1966) was a Canadian geophysicist and poet. He was the first published poet in Canada to write Imagist poetry, and later the first to write surrealist verse, both of which have led some to call him "the first modern Canadian poet."

== Life ==
Ross was born on 14 June 1894 in Peterborough, Ontario, to Ralph and Ella Louise Ross (née Wrighton). He grew up in Pembroke, Ontario. He studied geophysics at the University of Toronto, supporting his studies with summer work on geological surveys in Northern Ontario. prior Ross served with the Canadian Expeditionary Force in World War I as a private in the signal corps. On his return, he worked until his retirement as a geophysicist at the Dominion Magnetic Observatory at Agincourt, Ontario (now part of Toronto). He married Mary Evelyn Lowrey on 3 June 1924 who was "the well-known journalist." They had two children, Mary Loretta and Nancy Helen. The family lived at 62 Delaware Ave. in Toronto, Ontario. This house had been the family home of Mary Lowrey prior to her marriage to Ross.Ross was to live in this house for the rest of his life.

Ross began writing poetry in or around 1923. His earliest works "are written in free verse and reflect a knowledge of both imagism and Japanese poetry." In 1925, Ross developed the 'laconic' as a distinctly Canadian verse form, "one that would be 'native' and yet not 'free verse,' one that would be unrhymed and yet definitely a 'form.'"

One night in April 1928, after an evening's discussion of Canadian nationalism among friends, Ross wrote "practically all" of his most famous work, "North." "It never 'clicked' so well before or since as that night in 1928," he later wrote. "North" was a series of laconics based on Ross's memories of his summers in Northern Ontario years earlier. Ross submitted some of its poems to Harriet Monroe's Chicago magazine Poetry and to Marianne Moore's magazine The Dial, and was published in both.

In 1930, Ross published a book of Laconics, privately and only under the initials 'E.R.'. ("North" was the first section of the book.) Ross mailed his own review copies to periodicals that he respected. He received "an admiring review by Marianne Moore (Poetry 35, 1931)".

Ross's next book, in 1932, was a volume of Sonnets. It was meant as a companion volume to Laconics, the subject matter of the sonnets "mirroring the subject matter and imagery of the modernist poems" in the earlier book. Once again, the book was published privately, and signed only 'E.R.'. "After Sonnets, a work that he considered a failed book, Ross's disdain for publication increased."

In the 1930s Ross translated work by the surrealist Max Jacob. He also wrote prose poems influenced by Jacob and Franz Kafka, some of which were published in New Directions in Prose & Poetry for 1937. "His work in this period incorporates elements of automatic writing, transcendentalism, mysticism, and archetypal imagery." The above were the first published prose poems written in Canada.

Ralph Gustafson included Ross's work in his 1942 Anthology of Canadian Verse, bringing his works before a large reading public in Canada for the first time. By then, though, Ross had ceased to write new poetry. Through the next two decades he "revised and polished poems begun much earlier and experimented with some new poetry." He "confined his often brilliant verse-parodies to his letters and with the exception of Margaret Avison generally disliked the younger poets beginning to publish in the 'fifties.

In 1944, Ross wrote an article in the Canadian Forum, "On Canadian Poetry," as part of the ongoing nationalist/cosmopolitan debate, calling for a poetry that is "distinctly located" in a geographic "locale."

Ross contributed poems "sporadically to literary periodicals and anthologies until his death in 1966. Most of what he published after 1930 was solicited by anthologists or magazine editors. Critic Barry Callaghan suggests that Ross wrote 'only when strenuously urged by an anthologist or literature student.'" Urging by poet Raymond Souster resulted in previously unpublished poetry in the mimeographed collection Experiment 1923–29, published in 1956 by Souster's Contact Press, at which time Ross began to be recognized as Canada's first Imagist poet. However, "Ross felt this collection misrepresented him in its emphasis on his imagist work." Later encouragement by Callaghan led to Ross's composing new poetry included in the posthumously published Shapes and Sounds (1968). Shapes and sounds is a selection of Ross's poems edited by Souster and John Robert Colombo, with a memoir by Callaghan.

Ross died due to cancer in 1966.

== Writing ==
"Though never widely read outside academic circles ... Ross had clearly thought out his attitudes toward poetry early on and diverged little from his initial position." "He objected to both difficult and ornate verse and found the conventional romanticism of Canada's Confederation poets particularly unappealing." He "was disapprovingly detached from what was happening in Canadian poetry in general and disliked Pratt's 'pretty expert word-juggling and rhyming' in particular.... He felt more enthusiastic about poems by Pickthall, Knister and Patrick Anderson than Pratt, and Tom MacInnes 'quite hypnotized' him." His chief American influences were E.E. Cummings and Marianne Moore.

Ross distrusted the cosmopolitanism of the Montreal Group. In "On Australian Poetry" he "wrote that a poet is inevitably associated with a place and that the cosmopolitan doctrine as espoused by Smith was not tenable. 'I have a horrid suspicion,' he said, 'that the "Cosmopolis" will turn out to be not "world city" in general but one of London, New York City, [or] Paris.'"

=== Laconics ===
His first book,Laconics, "ratified Ross's claim as an innovative poetic craftsman by establishing an aesthetic bridgehead on the modern world, and the conditions under which poetry could be written in order to be reconciled with the modern world." It "collects the imagist poems Ross is best known for:" "The Fish," "The Diver," "The Dawn; the Birds," "The Snake Trying," "Glue," "The Creek," "The Wall": mostly, the poems of "North" that he had written that one night in April 1928.

"In Ross's spare, ... narrow poems, the inquiring spirit of the New World seeks release from old sentiments, customs, and poetic conventions.... Ross seeks 'something of the sharper tang of Canada' in the surface reflections and dark shadows of pine-surrounded lakes, where reality is recognized as profound and mysterious. The modern poet of the New World seeks illumination by objectifying the ordinary sensations of sight and sound. His explorations of the land of lake and loon thereby serve as metaphors for illumination and rejuvenation."

"In an early draft for his 'Introduction' to The Penguin Book of Canadian Verse (1958), Ralph Gustafson explained what these poems meant to him: 'A modern awareness, with its concomitant experimentation with technique, a reduction of Canada, of the quality of Canada, were entering into Canadian verse. W.W.E. Ross' "northern" poems were written almost entirely in one night in April 1928 ... They captured precisely, with wonder and freshness, a distinct Canada."

It has been said that the poems of "North" "present the northern Ontario landscape in the stark manner of the Group of Seven. His strongest work is undoubtedly this early imagist-oriented poetry, work that derives its strengths from his restrained, skeptical personality, from his scientist's preference for objective, factual material, and from his affection for the Canadian wilderness landscape." This is poetry which, as he wrote in 'On National Poetry' (Canadian Forum, 1944), is 'distinctly located' in a geographic 'locale.'

=== Sonnets ===
"Exhilarated by the knowledge that he had succeeded" in Laconics — "a knowledge that came to him from inner self-realization rather than popular success" — Ross next "turned his new-found strength, in Sonnets, to the conditions under which poetry had been written in the past. His purpose was ... to reduce tradition to the structures of the method that had tested out in Laconics."

The book "reveals a lesser-known side of Ross — the classicist and traditional metricist concerned not only with factual reality but also with spiritual truth." Sonnets was meant to be more overtly philosophical than Laconics — which Ross thought would be better suited by the traditional form's longer lines — but ultimately he considered the book an experiment that failed:

The general idea was to employ the 'clean' language of free verse without the lack of rhythm or pattern which offended me in all the latter except some of Pound etc. As regards Sonnets I had the notion that longer lines were needed to express ideas adequately and the sonnet form seemed suited to this purpose. I was ditched by my inability to carry over into them — the prestige of the models being so great — the aforesaid 'cleanness.'

== Legacy ==
"Ross's private and somewhat trenchant nature, together with his diffidence toward publishing and the publicly lived literary life, caused him to be little known during his lifetime except to fellow poets." He "was never fully accepted into the company of the 'moderns' — Livesay, Smith, Gustafson and so forth — because unlike them he was not interested in propagating the future any more than he was interested in perpetuating the past.... Ross was well-read in Canadian, European and American poetry, yet he cut his own work free from any direction that this reading might have suggested for his verse. His poetry is unique in its timelessness."

"Ross's writing became of special importance in the 1950s and 1960s when new generations of Canadian poets sought their precursors in the modernist goals of restraint, precision, organic rhythm, and the factual image."

== Publications ==
- Laconics (by E.R.) 1930.
- Sonnets (by E.R.) 1932.
- Experiment, 1923–1929. Toronto: Contact Press, 1956.
- Shapes & sounds: poems of W. W. E. Ross (with a portrait by Dennis Burton, a memoir by Barry Callaghan, and an editorial note by Raymond Souster and John Robert Colombo). (Toronto: Longman's 1968)
- Irrealities, Sonnets & Laconics. (Exile Editions, 2003) ISBN 978-1-55096-561-2

=== Anthologized poems ===
- "The Diver," "If Ice," "The Snake Trying," The New Oxford Book of Canadian Verse in English. Ed. Margaret Atwood. Toronto: Oxford University Press, 1983. ISBN 0-19-540450-5
