= List of municipal poets laureate in Massachusetts =

This is a list of past and current municipal poets laureate serving towns, counties, and cities in Massachusetts. The Poet Laureate for the Commonwealth is Regie Gibson (2025–)

== Amesbury ==
- Lainie Senechal – 2016–2017
- Stephen R Wagner – 2018–2019
- Ellie O'Leary – 2020–2023
- Lisa Usani Phillips – 2024–2025
- Brian Riley –2026–

== Andover ==
- Linda Flaherty Haltmaier – 2017–2022

== Arlington ==
- Miriam Levine – 2015–2017
- Cathie DesJardins – 2017–2019
- Steven Ratiner – 2019–2021
- Jean Flanagan – 2023–2026
- Teresa Cader –2026–

== Attleboro ==
- Briana Serradas – 2022–2023

== Boston ==
- Samuel James Cornish – 2008–2014
- Danielle Legros Georges – 2014–2019
- Porsha Olayiwola – 2020–2024
- Alondra Bobadilla (Youth Poet Laureate) – 2020–2022
- Anjalequa Leynneyah Verona Birkett (Youth Poet Laureate) – 2022–2024
- Parker-Vincent Alva (Youth Poet Laureate) – 2024–2026
- Emmanuel Oppong-Yeboah – 2025–
- Ailin Sha (Youth Poet Laureate) – 2026–

== Brockton ==
- Philip Hasouris – 2020–2025
- Hannah Baptiste (Youth Poet Laureate) – 2020–2025
- Pauline Anderson – 2025–2027
- Adriana D'Haiti (Youth Poet Laureate) – 2025–2027

== Brookline ==
- Judith Steinbergh – 2012–2015
- Jan Schreiber – 2015–2017
- Zvi A. Sesling – 2017–2020
- Jennifer Barber– 2021–2025
- Allison Adair– 2025–

== Cambridge ==
From 2007-2015 Cambridge has a "Poet Populist" chosen by municipal election and arrange through the Cambridge Arts Council and public library. Beginning in 2016, the Cambridge Arts Council began naming "Poetry Ambassadors" for the city through a public nomination and selection process.

- Peter Payack (Poet Populist) – 2007–2009
- Jean-Dany Joachim (Poet Populist) – 2009–2011
- Toni Bee (Poet Populist) – 2011–2013
- Lo Galluccio (Poet Populist) – 2013–2015

== Easthampton ==
- Gary Metras – 2018–2019
- María José Giménez – 2019–2021
- Jason R. Montgomery (concurrent with Alex Woolner) – 2021–2023
- Alex Woolner (concurrent with Jason R. Montgomery) – 2021–2023
- Carolyn A. Cushing – 2023–2025
- Carolyn Zaikowski – 2025–2027

== Falmouth ==
- Adelaide Cummings – 2012–2020

== Gloucester ==
- Vincent Ferrini – 1998–2007
- John J. Ronan – 2008–2010
- Ruthanne Collinson – 2010–2014
- Peter Albert Todd – 2014–2015
- Heidi Wakeman (co-laureate) – 2025–
- Jay Featherstone (co-laureate) – 2025–

== Haverhill ==
- Dan Speers – 2022–

== Lynn ==
- Michelle "LaPoetica" Richardson – 2025–2027

== Malden ==
- CD Collins – 2023–2026

== Martha's Vineyard ==
- Lee H. McCormack - 2012-2014
- Arnie Reisman - 2014-2016
- Justen Ahren – 2017–2019
- Jill Jupen – 2019–2024
- Claudia Taylor – 2024–2026

== Medford ==
- Terry E. Carter – 2021-2023
- Vijaya Sundaram – 2023–2025
- Max Heinegg – 2025–2027

== Needham ==
- Anne E.G. Nydam – 2024–

== New Bedford ==
- Everett Hoagland – 1994-1998
- John Landry – 2007–2010
- Patricia Gomes – 2014–2021
- Sarah Mulvey – 2022–

== Newton ==
In 2026, Newton began the process to select the first municipal Poet Laureate, with an anticipated appointment in December, 2026 for three-year term beginning to begin January, 2027.

== North Andover ==
- Michael Souza – 2006–2008
- Gayle Heney – 2008–2012
- Karen Kline – 2012–2016
- Ken Delano (co-laureate) – 2016–2018
- Nadine Delano (co-laureate) – 2016–2018
- Mark Bohrer – 2018–2023
- Jason O'Toole – 2023–2025
- Christa A. Lamb – 2025–2029

== North Attleborough ==
- Kayla Roy – 2025–

== Northampton ==
- Martin Espada – 2001–2003
- Janet Aalfs – 2003–2005
- Jack Gilbert – 2006–2008
- Lesléa Newman – 2008–2010
- Lenelle Moïse – 2010–2012
- Richard Michelson – 2012–2015
- Patrick Donnelly – 2015–2017
- Amy Dryansky – 2017–2019
- Karen Skolfield – 2019–2021
- Franny Choi – 2024–2026
- Ari Banias – 2026–

== Plymouth ==
- Stephan Delbos – 2020–2023
- Miriam O'Neal – 2024–

== Rockport ==
- Sharon Chace – 2017–2022
- Robert Whelan – 2022–

== Salem ==
- J.D. Scrimgeour – 2025–2026
- Liana Galvan (Youth Poet Laureate) – 2025–

== Somerville ==
- Nicole Terez Dutton – 2015–2016
- Gloria Mindock – 2017–2018
- Lloyd Schwartz – 2019–

== Springfield ==
- María Luisa Arroyo – 2014–2016
- Magdalena Gómez – 2019–2022

== Swampscott ==
- Nancy Hewitt –
- Stephen Iannaconne –
- Lee Eric Freedman –
- Shelli Jankowski-Smith – 2018–2020
- Harper Merritt (Youth Poet Laureate – 2018–2019

== West Tisbury ==
- Dan Waters – 2006–2009
- Fan Ogilvie – 2009–2012
- Justen Ahren – 2012–2015
- Emma Young – 2015–2018
- Spencer Thurlow – 2018–2022
- Tain Leonard-Peck – 2022–2025
- Adriana Stimola – 2025–

== Westwood ==
- Lynne Viti – 2023–2025
- Elizabeth Lowney (Youth Poet Laureate) – 2024–2025
- Beth Swinning – 2025–2027
- Charles Goodman(Youth Poet Laureate) – 2025–2026
- Liyann Alrayashi (Youth Poet Laureate) – 2026–2027

== Worcester ==
- Gertrude Halstead – 2007–2012
- Amina Mohammed (Youth Poet Laureate)– 2020–2021
- Juan Matos – 2020–2022
- Adael "Ace" Mejia (Youth Poet Laureate)– 2022–2023
- Oliver de la Paz – 2023–2025
- Serenity Jackson (Youth Poet Laureate)– 2024–2025
- Nicole Jean Turner – 2026–2028
- Samara Tang-Rainwater (Youth Poet Laureate)– 2026–2027
