= Jorge Cáceres =

Jorge Cáceres may refer to:

- Jorge Cáceres (poet) (1923–1949), Chilean poet
- Jorge Cáceres (pentathlete) (1917–1975), Argentine pentathlete
- Jorge Cáceres, Paraguayan footballer, in 2003 FIFA World Youth Championship squads
- Jorge Luis Cáceres (born 1982), Ecuadorian writer, editor, and anthologist
- Jorge Ramón Cáceres (1948–2025), Colombian football forward
