= Miguel Serrano =

Chilean diplomat and esoteric fascist (1917–2009)

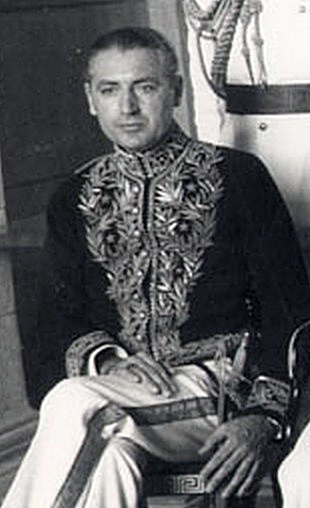
- As ambassador to India, 1957
- Born: Miguel Joaquín Diego del Carmen Serrano Fernández; 10 September 1917; Santiago, Chile
- Died: 28 February 2009 (aged 91); Santiago, Chile
- Resting place: Santiago, Chile
- Education: Internado Nacional Barros Arana
- Occupations: Writer, diplomat
- Notable work: The Serpent of Paradise; The Ultimate Flower; El/Ella: Book of Magic Love; The Visits of the Queen of Sheba; C.G. Jung and Hermann Hesse: A Record of Two Friendships; Nos: Book of the Resurrection; Adolf Hitler: The Last Avatar

Miguel Joaquín Diego del Carmen Serrano Fernández (10 September 1917 – 28 February 2009) was a Chilean diplomat, writer, occultist, and fascist activist. A Nazi sympathiser in the late 1930s and early 1940s, he later became a prominent figure in the neo-Nazi movement as an exponent of Esoteric Hitlerism.

Born to a wealthy Chilean family, he developed an interest in writing and far-right politics, allying himself with the National Socialist Movement of Chile. During the Second World War, in which Chile remained neutral until 1943, Serrano campaigned in support of Nazi Germany and promoted antisemitic conspiracy theories through his own fortnightly publication, La Nueva Edad. In 1942, he joined an occult order founded by a German immigrant which combined pro-Nazi sentiment with ceremonial magic and kundalini yoga. It presented the Nazi German leader Adolf Hitler as a spiritual adept who had incarnated to Earth as a savior of the Aryan race and who would lead humanity out of a dark age known as the Kali Yuga. Serrano became convinced that Hitler had not died in 1945 but had secretly survived and was living in Antarctica. After visiting Antarctica, Serrano travelled to Germany and then Switzerland, where he met the novelist Hermann Hesse and psychoanalyst Carl Jung; in 1965, he published a reminiscence of his time with the pair.

In 1953, Serrano joined the Chilean diplomatic corps and was stationed in India until 1963, where he took a keen interest in Hinduism and wrote several books. He was later made ambassador to Yugoslavia and then Austria, and while in Europe made contacts with various former Nazis and other far-rightists living on the continent. Following Chile's election of a socialist President, Salvador Allende, Serrano was dismissed from the diplomatic service in 1970. After Allende was ousted in a coup and Augusto Pinochet took power, Serrano returned to Chile in 1973. He became a prominent organiser in the Chilean neo-Nazi movement, holding annual celebrations of Hitler's birthday, organising a neo-Nazi rally in Santiago, and producing a neo-Nazi political manifesto. He wrote a trilogy of books on Hitler in which he outlined his view of the Nazi leader as an avatar. He remained in contact with neo-Nazis elsewhere in the world and gave interviews to various foreign far-right publications. After Savitri Devi, he has been considered the most prominent exponent of Esoteric Hitlerism within the neo-Nazi movement.

== Biography ==
=== Childhood: 1917–1938 ===
Miguel Joaquín Diego del Carmen Serrano Fernández was born on 10 September 1917. On his maternal line, he was descended from the countesses of Sierra Bella. His mother, Berta Fernández Fernández, died when Serrano was five years old, while his father, Diego Serrano Manterola, died three years later. He had two younger brothers and a sister, who were then all raised by his paternal grandmother, Fresia Manterola de Serrano, moving between a Santiago townhouse and a 17th-century country mansion in the Claro Valley.

Between 1929 and 1934, he studied at the Internado Nacional Barros Arana. The school had been heavily influenced by Prussian staff members who had arrived in the late 19th century, with Serrano attributing his later Germanophilia to this early exposure to German culture. At the school he moved in literary circles. A close friend of his was Hector Barreto, a poet and socialist. Aged 18, Barreto was killed in a brawl with uniformed Nacistas, members of the National Socialist Movement of Chile, a fascist group inspired by the example of the Nazi Party in Germany. This event encouraged Serrano's involvement in left-wing politics as he began to take an interest in Marxism and the Chilean Marxist movement. He wrote articles for leftist journals like Sobre la marcha, La Hora, and Frente Popular. His uncle, the poet Vicente Huidobro, encouraged him to join the left-wing Republicans in the ongoing Spanish Civil War, but he did not do so.

=== Nazism and occultism: 1939–1952 ===
Serrano grew critical of Marxism and left-wing politics, instead being drawn to the Nacistas after their failed coup in September 1938. By July 1939, Serrano was publicly associating himself with the Nacista movement, now organised as the Popular Socialist Vanguard. He began writing for their journal, Trabajo, and accompanied their leader, Jorge González von Marées, on his speaking tours across Chile. At the outbreak of the Second World War, in which Chile remained neutral, Serrano expressed support for Nazi Germany; from July 1941 he launched a fortnightly pro-Nazi publication, La Nueva Edad. Among the magazine's regular contributors were the journalist René Arriagada, General Francisco Javier Díaz, and Hugo Gallo, who was the cultural attaché at the Italian Embassy. Through this work, Serrano developed close links with the German Embassy in Chile and its personnel.

Although Serrano had initially shown little interest in Nazi attitudes towards Jewish people, he became increasingly interested in antisemitic conspiracy theories about Jews manipulating world events. Two Chilean artists gave him a Spanish language translation of the Protocols of the Elders of Zion, a text purporting to expose this alleged international Jewish conspiracy. According to the historian Nicholas Goodrick-Clarke, it was this discovery of the Protocols which "marked a crucial point in the development of Serrano's Nazism". From November 1941, he began printing excerpts from the Protocols in La Nueva Edad.

Serrano also developed an interest in forms of religious or spiritual practice, including both Western esotericism and Hinduism. In late 1941, Gallo suggested that Serrano could support the German and Italian war effort not just through his publications, but also on the etheric Inner Planes, introducing him to an esoteric order sympathetic to Nazism. Serrano later claimed that this order had been founded near the start of the 20th century by a German migrant known as "F. K." Serrano was initiated into the group in February 1942.

F. K. claimed that the group owed its allegiance to a secretive Brahmin elite who resided in the Himalayas. It practiced combined kundalini yoga with ceremonial magic and expressed a pro-Nazi position. It espoused a belief in an astral body which could be awakened through various rituals and meditative practices. The group revered the Nazi German leader Adolf Hitler as the savior of an Aryan race and presented him as a shudibudishvabhaba, an initiate of immense willpower who had voluntarily incarnated onto Earth to assist in the overthrow of the Kali Yuga, a present dark age for humanity. F. K. claimed that through the astral realm, he was able to establish a connection with Hitler, during which they had various conversations.

As the Second World War ended in defeat for Nazi Germany in 1945, Serrano was convinced that Hitler had not committed suicide in Berlin as was claimed by the victorious Allies. Instead, Serrano believed that Hitler had escaped and was living in Antarctica, either in a secluded warm environment on the continent or under the ice cap itself. This idea had been suggested to him by F. K.—who claimed that he remained in astral contact with Hitler—but was also widely rumoured in the Latin American press. In 1947, Ladislao Szabó's book Hitler est vivo had been published, exerting an influence on Serrano. Szabó's book alleged that a U-boat convoy had taken Hitler to safety in Queen Maud Land. In 1947–48, Serrano travelled to Antarctica as a journalist with the Chilean Army. In 1948, he wrote his own short book, La Antártica y otros Mitos, which repeated Szabó's claims about Hitler's survival.

In 1951, Serrano travelled to Europe, and in Germany visited various sites associated with the Nazi Party, including Hitler's Berlin bunker, Hitler's Berghof home, and Spandau Prison, where Rudolf Hess and other prominent Nazis were then imprisoned. During this trip he also visited Switzerland, where he met and befriended the writer Hermann Hesse and the psychoanalyst Carl Jung.

=== Diplomatic career: 1953–1970 ===
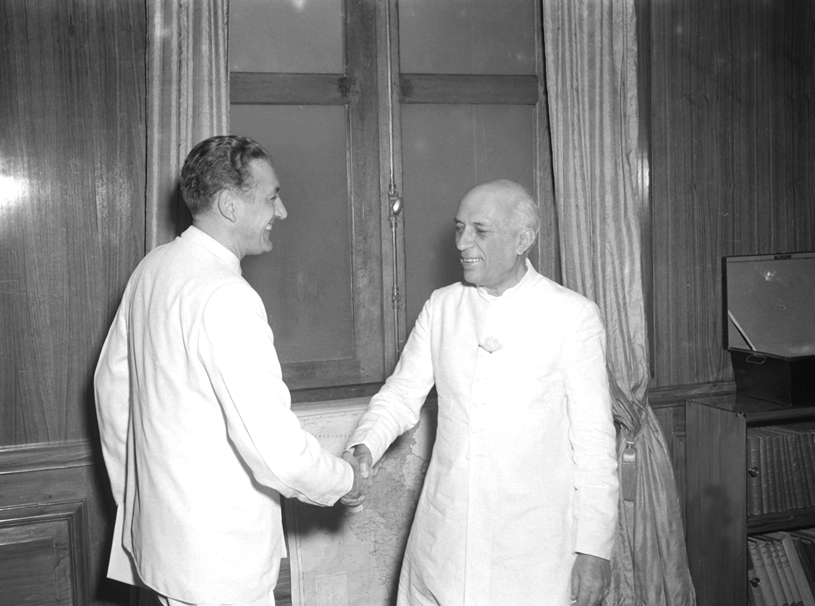
Serrano meeting Indian Prime Minister Jawaharlal Nehru (right) in May 1957

In 1953, Serrano—following a number of other family members—joined the Chilean diplomatic corps. He hoped to gain a posting to India, a land which he considered to be a source of great spiritual truths. He was successful in this, and remained in India until 1962. In this period, he visited many Hindu temples and searched for evidence of the secretive Brahmanical order into which F. K. had alleged initiation. In his role as a diplomat, he met various prominent figures, including Jawaharlal Nehru, Indira Gandhi, and the 14th Dalai Lama. It was while in India that he wrote and published two books: The Visits of the Queen of Sheba (1960), which had a preface by Jung, and The Serpent of Paradise (1963), which discussed his experiences in the country. Serrano had engaged in further correspondence with Jung between 1957 and 1961. In 1965 his book, C. J. Jung and Hermann Hesse: A Record of Two Friendships, was published.

Leaving India, from 1962 to 1964 he was posted as the Chilean ambassador to Bulgaria. From 1964 to 1970 he then served as his country's ambassador to Austria, for which he lived in Vienna. During the latter posting, he also represented Chile at the International Atomic Energy Agency and the United Nations Industrial Development Organization, both of which were based in Vienna. While in Europe, he had sought out a number of individuals linked to Nazism and to the far-right more broadly; these included visits to the Ahnenerbe co-founder Herman Wirth, the designer and occultist Wilhelm Landig, the poet Ezra Pound, and the Traditionalist thinker Julius Evola. He established friendships with a number of individuals involved in the old Nazi movement, including Léon Degrelle, Otto Skorzeny, Hans-Ulrich Rudel, Marc "Saint-Loup" Augier, and Hanna Reitsch. He also discussed issues with the ancient astronaut proponent Robert Charroux.

In the 1970 Chilean presidential election, the Socialist Salvador Allende was elected president. Later that year, Serrano was dropped from the country's diplomatic service. Rather than returning to Chile, he moved to Switzerland, renting an apartment in the Casa Camuzzi—where Hesse had lived from 1912 to 1931—at Montagnola in the Swiss Ticino.

=== Later life: 1973–2009 ===
The loss of his diplomatic position, coupled with the establishment of a Marxist government in Chile, led Serrano to take a revived interest in Nazism. He began reading a number of recently published books that purported to identify links between Nazism and occultism. In 1973, his book El/Ella: Book of Magic Love was published. After Allende was ousted in a September 1973 coup and a right-wing military regime under Augusto Pinochet took power, Serrano returned to Chile. He nevertheless found that the Pinochet administration was not interested in his neo-Nazi and Esoteric Hitlerist ideas. In 1980, his book Nos: A Book of the Resurrection was published, a form of autobiography influenced by Jungian psychology. He also produced a trio of books that came to be known as his "Hitler Trilogy": El Cordón Dorado: Hitlerismo Esotérico (1978), Adolf Hitler, el Ultimo Avatãra (1984), and Manú: "Por el hombre que vendra" (1991).

He increasingly associated with old Nazis living in Chile as well as with their neo-Nazi sympathisers. In May 1984 he attended the funeral of Walter Rauff—a member of the Waffen SS who had played a role in organising the early stages of the Holocaust and who had fled to Chile after the Second World War—and there gave the Nazi salute. In 1986 he published a political manifesto for Nazism in the Southern Cone of South America. He began organising annual celebrations of Hitler's birthday at a rural retreat in Chile. In September 1993, he led a neo-Nazi rally in Santiago—dressed in what had become his trademark black leather coat—in honor of the Nazi Rudolf Hess and the Nacistas summarily executed by Chilean police officers following their 1938 coup attempt. As well as playing a role in organising the Chilean neo-Nazi movement, Serrano maintained correspondences with neo-Nazis elsewhere in the world, such as the American Matt Koehl.

Serrano was the subject of an extensive interview in the Greek far-right magazine ΤΟ ΑΝΤΙΔΟΤΟ. Here, he sought to engage a younger audience by contrasting his millennial vision of Nazism with his perception of the corruption of modern liberalism. He was also the subject of a feature in The Flaming Sword, a magazine issued by the Black Order, a neo-Nazi Satanist group established by the New Zealander Kerry Bolton. Bolton had also written his own study of Serrano's Esoteric Hitlerism, and the Black Order's occult framework was influenced by Serrano's ideas. Despite the interest that Nazi Satanists took in Serrano's work, he was critical of attempts to combine Satanism with Nazism, in 2001 stating that individuals who did so "will only damage our sacred fight with all the kookiness from California, like Satanism". He added that "Many Satanists do not know that they are manipulated, psychotronically, in fact hypnotized, when not infiltrated by the CIA, Mossad and other such secret organisations."

By the early 1990s, Serrano's Esoteric Hitlerist ideas were spreading among modern pagans, gaining particular popularity among far-right Germanic heathens in the United States. The American Heathen Katja Lane of the Wotansvolk group secured the rights to publish English translations of Serrano's work, with Wotansvolk becoming the main promoter of Serrano's writings in the Anglophone world through their 14 Word Press. One of the prominent far-right Heathens to be influenced by Serrano's ideas was Jost Turner. Another American occultist to cite an influence from Serrano's ideas was Michael Moynihan, who also cited having been influenced by Evola, Muammar Gaddafi, Mikhail Bakunin, and James Mason.

On 28 February 2009, Serrano died after suffering a stroke in his apartment in the Santa Lucía Hill sector of Santiago, the capital. During his funeral at the General Cemetery, the procession paused at Irene Klatt Getta's crypt, where his coffin and the crowd of over 100 people stopped momentarily before continuing.

== Reception and legacy ==
The historian of religion Mattias Gardell described Serrano as "one of the most important occult fascist ideologues in the Spanish-speaking world". The historian of religion Arthur Versluis noted that Serrano was "the most important figure" in esoteric Hitlerism after Savitri Devi. According to Goodrick-Clarke, Serrano's "mystical Nazism" was "a major example of the Thulean mythology's successful migration to South America in the post-war period". Goodrick-Clarke thought it "likely that old Nazis welcome[d] Serrano's enthusiasm and unswerving loyalty to their hero, Adolf Hitler", even if they found the Esoteric Hitlerist mythology that he promoted to be farfetched. Conversely, Goodrick-Clarke thought, for younger neo-Nazis, "a coloring of pop mythology, Hinduism, and extraterrestrial Aryan gods adds sensational appeal to the powerful myths of elitism, planetary destiny and the cosmic conspiracy of the Jews."

The historian Rafael Videla Eissman proposed that a plaque commemorating Serrano be erected on the western side of the Cerro Santa Lucía, although in June 2014 the municipality of Santiago rejected the idea. In February 2016, the newspaper La Segunda published an interview with Serrano's grandson, Sebastián Araya, in which he discussed his relationship with his grandfather. In December 2017, the author and journalist Gonzalo León published a fictionalized novelisation of Serrano's life.

Isabel Peralta, the current spokeswoman for the Spanish party National November, has openly praised Serrano, naming him, alongside Giovanni Gentile, Benito Mussolini, and Adolf Hitler, as a “theoretician of her ideology”.

== Ideas ==
In 1984 he published his 643-page tome, Adolf Hitler, el Último Avatãra (Adolf Hitler: The Last Avatar), which is dedicated "To the glory of the Führer, Adolf Hitler". In this arcane work, Serrano unfolds his ultimate philosophical testament through elaborate esoteric and mythological symbolism. He insists that there has been a vast historical conspiracy to conceal the origins of evolved humankind. Serrano's epic vista opens with extragalactic beings who founded the First Hyperborea, a terrestrial but non-physical realm, which was neither geographically limited nor bound by the circles of reincarnation. The Hyperboreans were asexual and reproduced through "plasmic emanations" from their ethereal bodies; the Vril power was theirs to command, the light of the Black Sun coursed through their veins and they saw with the third eye. Serrano contends that the last documents relating to them were destroyed along with the Alexandrian Library, and that, latterly, these beings have been misunderstood as extraterrestrials arriving in spaceships or UFOs. However, the First Hyperborea was immaterial and altogether outside our mechanistic universe.

The latter is under the jurisdiction of the Demiurge, an inferior godlet whose realm is the physical planet Earth. The Demiurge had created a bestial imitation of humanity in the form of proto-human "robots" like Neanderthal Man, and intentionally consigned his creatures to an endless cycle of involuntary reincarnation on the earthly plane to no higher purpose. The Hyperboreans recoiled in horror from this entrapment within the Demiurge's cycles. They themselves take the devayana, the Way of the Gods, at death and return to the earth (as Bodhisattvas) only if they are willing.

Determined upon a heroic war to reclaim the Demiurge's deteriorating world, the Hyperboreans clothed themselves in material bodies and descended on to the Second Hyperborea, a ring-shaped continent around the North Pole. During this Golden Age or Satya Yuga, they magnanimously instructed the Demiurge's creations (the Black, Yellow and Red races native to the planet) and began to raise them above their animal condition. Then disaster struck; some of the Hyperboreans rebelled and intermingled their blood with the creatures of the Demiurge, and through this transgression Paradise was lost. Serrano refers to Genesis 6.4: "the sons of God came in to the daughters of men, and they bore children to them". By diluting the divine blood, the primordial miscegenation accelerated the process of material decay. This was reflected in outward catastrophes and the North and South Poles reversed positions as a result of the fall of a comet or moon. The polar continent disappeared beneath the deluge and Hyperborea became invisible again. The Hyperboreans themselves survived, some taking refuge at the South Pole. Serrano regards the mysterious appearance of the fine and artistic Cro-Magnon Man in Europe as evidence of Hyperboreans driven southward by the Ice Age. But Serrano claims that the Golden Age can be reattained if the Hyperboreans' descendants, the Aryans, consciously repurify their blood to restore the divine blood-memory:

There is nothing more mysterious than blood. Paracelsus considered it a condensation of light. I believe that the Aryan, Hyperborean blood is that – but not the light of the Golden Sun, not of a galactic sun, but of the light of the Black Sun, of the Green Ray.

== Written works ==
Year	Book	Publisher, ISBN	Notes
1938	Antología del Verdadero Cuento en Chile	Santiago de Chile, Talleres "Gutenberg".	Selections, prologue, and notes by Serrano. Short stories by: Pedro Carrillo, Braulio Arenas, Adrián Jiménez, Juan Tejeda, Eduardo Anguita, Teófilo Cid, Juan Emar, Carlos Droguett, Anuar Atías, Miguel Serrano, and Héctor Barreto.
1948	La Antártica y otros Mitos [The Antarctic and other myths]	First edition (Spanish): 1948 (Santiago de Chile). 52 pages Other editions: Excalibur, XIV (winter 1988). The New Age Santiago, 2004. ISBN 956-299-394-9.	Speech that was delivered by Miguel Serrano in 1948 after his participation in the Second Chilean Antarctic Expedition (1947–48).
1950	Ni por mar ni por tierra… (historia de una generación) [Neither by land nor by sea... (story of a generation)]	First edition (Spanish): 1950 (Nascimento, Santiago de Chile). 400 pages. Other editions: EB Books. Santiago, 2017. ISBN 978-956-9436-09-3. Kier. Buenos Aires, 1979 (abbreviated). Trilogy of the search in the outside world. Nascimento Santiago, 1974 (abbreviated).	
1957	Quién llama en los Hielos [Invitation to the icefields]	Santiago, Chile, Editorial Nascimento; Barcelona: Planeta, [1974] ISBN 84-320-5292-2	
1960	Los misterios [The Mysteries]	First edition (Spanish): 1960 (New Delhi). 20 pages Other editions: Be-uve-drais. Santiago, 2006 (Spanish). ISBN 956-7878-40-4. EB Books. Santiago, 2016 (Spanish). ISBN 978-956-9436-07-9. Excalibur, vol. XVII (autumn 1989) (Spanish). New Delhi, 1960 (English).	
1960	Las visitas de la Reina de Saba. Translated as The Visits of the Queen of Sheba, foreword by C. G. Jung	[Santiago de Chile] Nascimento; Bombay, New York: Asia Pub. House; New York: Harper & Row [1973, c1972], ISBN 0-06-090315-5; London, Boston: Routledge and K. Paul [1972], 2nd ed., ISBN 0-7100-7341-0 & ISBN 0-7100-7399-2 (pbk.)	
1963	La Serpiente del Paraíso. Translated as The Serpent of Paradise: The Story of an Indian Pilgrimage	Santiago, Chile, Editorial Nascimento; London: Rider [1963]; New York: Harper & Row [1st American ed., 1972] ISBN 0-06-090284-1; London: Routledge and Kegan Paul [Revised ed., 1974], ISBN 0-7100-7784-X & ISBN 0-7100-7785-8	
1965	El círculo hermético, de Hesse a Jung. Translated as C. G. Jung and Hermann Hesse: A Record of Two Friendships, and alternatively as Jung and Hesse: A Record of Two Friendships	Santiago: Zig-Zag [1965]; New York: Schocken Books [1966]; London: Routledge & K. Paul [1966]; ISBN 0-8052-0858-5	
1969	The Ultimate Flower	New York: Schocken Books [1970, c1969]; London: Routledge & K. Paul [1969], ISBN 0-7100-6620-1 & ISBN 0-06-090285-X	
1972	El/Ella: Book of Magic Love	New York: Harper & Row, ISBN 0-06-013829-7; ISBN 0-7100-7762-9	
1974	Trilogía de la Busqueda del Mundo Exterior	Santiago, Chile: Editorial Nascimento	Anthology of Ni por mar, ni por tierra, Quién llama en los hielos, and La serpiente del paraíso.
1978	El Cordón Dorado: Hitlerismo Esotérico [The Golden Thread: Esoteric Hitlerism]		Part one of his Hitler Trilogy
1980	Nos, libro de la Resurección. Translated to Nos: Book of the Resurrection	Buenos Aires: Editorial Kier; London, Boston: Routledge & Kegan Paul [1984], ISBN 0-7100-9828-6	
1984	Adolf Hitler, el Último Avatãra [Adolf Hitler: The Last Avatar]		Part two of his Hitler Trilogy
1986	Nacionalsocialismo, Unica Solución para los Pueblos de América del Sur [National Socialism, the Only Solution for the Countries of South America]	Santiago: Alfabeta; Bogotá: Editorial Solar, 2nd ed. [1987]	
1986	La Resurrección del Héroe: Año 97 de la era Hitleriana [The Resurrection of the Hero: 97th Year of the Hitlerian Era]	Santiago: Alfabeta Impresores	
1987	Contra la Usura by Gottfried Feder; Serrano [contribuidor].	Santiago, Chile: Alfabeta Impr.	Spanish translation of Manifest zur Brechung der Zinsknechtschaft des Geldes [The Manifesto for Breaking the Interest Bondage of Money]
1991	MANÚ: "Por El Hombre Que Vendra" [Manu: For the Coming Man]		Part three of his Hitler Trilogy
1992	No Celebraremos la Muerte de los Dioses Blancos		
1994	Nuestro Honor se Llama Lealtad		
1995	Imitacion de la Verdad: La ciberpoliítica. Internet, realidad virtual, telepresencia	Santiago: Author	
1996	Memorias de Él y Yo vol. I, Aparición del "Yo" – Alejamiento de "Él" [Memories of Him and Me. Volume 1. Appearance of the "I", distancing from "him"]	Santiago: La Nueva Edad. First edition (Spanish): 1996 (The New Age, Santiago de Chile). 216 pages. ISBN 956-272-246-5. Other editions: Solar. Bogotá, 2001. ISBN 958-8136-15-6.	
1997	Memorias de Él y Yo vol. II, Adolf Hitler y la Gran Guerra [Memories of Him and Me. Volume II. Adolf Hitler and the Great War]	Santiago: La Nueva Edad. First edition (Spanish): 1997 (The New Age, Santiago de Chile). 312 pages ISBN 956-272-623-1. Other editions: Solar. Bogotá, 2001. ISBN 958-8136-16-4.	
1998	Memorias de Él y Yo vol. III, Misión en los Transhimalaya [Memories of Him and Me. Volume 3. Mission in the Transhimalaya]	Santiago: La Nueva Edad. Spanish, first edition 312 pages Editions The New Age (1998) ISBN 956-288-008-7 Other editions: Solar. Bogotá, 2001. ISBN 958-8136-17-2.	
1999	Memorias de Él y Yo vol. IV, El Regreso [Memories of Him and Me. Volume 4. The Return]	Santiago: La Nueva Edad. First edition (Spanish): 1999 (The New Age, Santiago de Chile). 312 pages ISBN 956-288-290-X. Other editions: Solar. Bogotá, 2001. ISBN 958-8136-18-0 (958-8136-8-0).	
2000	Foreword to Temple of Wotan: Holy Book of the Aryan Tribes by Ron McVan	14 Word Press, ISBN 0-9678123-3-X	
2001	Se Acabó Chile		
2003	El hijo del viudo [The Son of the Widower]	Spanish, 2003: La Nueva Edad. Santiago de Chile. 72 páginas. ISBN 956-291-645-6. English, 2003: The New Age Santiago. ISBN 956-291-931-5.	
2003	La entrega de la Patagonia mágica		
2005	Hipocresía. La tortura en Chile		
2005	MAYA, La Realidad Es Una Ilusión [MAYA, Reality is an Illusion]	Spanish, 2005: La Nueva Edad. Santiago de Chile. 44 páginas. ISBN 956-299-554-2. English 2006: The New Age. Santiago. ISBN 956-310-264-9	

== See also ==
- Jacques de Mahieu
- Paul Schäfer
- José López Rega
