= Garrett Caples =

American poet

- Born: 1972 (age 53–54); Lawrence, Massachusetts, United States
- Occupations: Poet, editor, journalist
- Years active: Late 1990s–present

Garrett Caples (born 1972) is an American poet and former music and arts journalist. Born in Lawrence, Massachusetts, he currently lives in San Francisco, California, after fifteen years in Oakland. An editor at City Lights Books, Caples curates the new American poetry series, City Lights Spotlight. From 2005 to 2014, he wrote on hip hop, literature, and painting for the San Francisco Bay Guardian, and has written fiction on unusual sexual practices, like omorashi.

As a hip hop journalist, Caples has been the first to write about various Bay Area rappers, including J Stalin, D-Lo, Eddi Projex, Traxamillion, Droop-E, and Shady Nate. He has also written cover stories on more established artists like E-40, Mac Dre, Mistah FAB, Husalah (Mob Figaz), and The Jacka (Mob Figaz). Notably, his interview with Shock-G of Digital Underground announced the end of the classic hip hop crew.

Caples is the author of The Garrett Caples Reader (Angle Press/Black Square Editions, 1999), er, um (Meritage Press, 2002), The Philistine's Guide to Hip Hop (Ninevolt, 2004), and Complications (Meritage Press, 2007). In 2006, Narrow house Recordings released a cd of Caples reading his poems with lo-fi musical accompaniment called Surrealism's Bad Rap. His latest book of poems, Power Ballads, appeared from Wave Books in September 2016.

Caples is also the editor of Pocket Poets Number 60, When I Was a Poet, by David Meltzer (City Lights, 2011) and Number 59, Tau by Philip Lamantia & Journey to the End by John Hoffman (City Lights, 2008). His pamphlet, Quintessence of the Minor: Symbolist Poetry in English, was published by Wave Books in 2010. With Nancy Peters and Andrew Joron, he is the editor of The Collected Poems of Philip Lamantia for the University of California Press (2013). With Julien Poirier, he has edited Incidents of Travel in Poetry: New and Selected Poems by New York School poet Frank Lima for City Lights Books (2016). A shortened version of his introduction, "The Lives of Frank Lima," received the Editors Prize for Best Feature Article from Poetry magazine. His book of essays, Retrievals, was published in 2014 by Wave Books, and features essays he wrote over a ten-year period about various writers and artists who have disappeared from view or never achieved much visibility despite their significance, "written in Caples' signature blend of erudition and élan." Caples also edited Mule Kick Blues, And Last Poems (City Lights Publishers, 2021), the final book of poems by Michael McClure.

== Bibliography ==
Full-length poetry collections

- The Garrett Caples Reader (Angle Press/Black Square Editions, 1999)
- Complications (Meritage Press, 2007)
- Power Ballads (Wave Books, 2016)
- The Rise & Fall of Johnny Volume (fmsbw, 2021)
- Lovers of Today (Wave Books, 2021)

Fiction

- Proses: Incomparable Parables! Fabulous Fables! Cruel Tales! (Wave Books, 2024)

Critique

- The Philistine's Guide to Hip Hop (Ninevolt, 2004)
- Retrievals (Wave Books, 2014)

Audio CDs

- Surrealism's Bad Rap (Narrow house Recordings, 2006)

Chapbooks

- The Dream of Curtains (Angle Press, 1998)
- er, um, with drawings by Hu Xin (Meritage Press, 2002)
- avid diva (Lew Gallery/Auguste Press, 2010)
- Invisible Sleep (Auguste Press, 2013)
- What Surrealism Means to Me, with drawings by Brian Lucas (Gas Meter Books, 2014)

Pamphlets

- Quintessence of the Minor (Wave Books, 2010)

Anthology appearances

- Fetish (4 Walls 8 Windows, 1998)
- Isn't It Romantic: 100 Love Poems by Younger American Poets (Wave Books, 2004)
- Bay Poetics (Faux Press, 2005)
- State of the Union: 50 Political Poems (Wave Books, 2008)
