= Julien Poirier =

American poet (born 1970)

- Born: October 28, 1970 (age 55); San Francisco, CA
- Education: Columbia University
- Website: http://www.poetryfoundation.org/bio/julien-poirier/

Julien Poirier (born October 28, 1970) is an American poet born in the San Francisco Bay Area. He is the author of several poetry collections, and the editor of an anthology of writing and a book of travel journals.

== Biography ==
Julien Poirier was born in 1970 and grew up in the San Francisco Bay Area. Poirier received his education at Columbia University in New York City. He is also a founding member of Ugly Duckling Presse Collective. He has taught poetry in New York City and San Francisco public schools and at San Quentin State Prison.

== Publications ==
Poirier has published numerous poetry collections, including El Golpe Chileño (Ugly Duckling, 2010), Stained Glass Windows of California (Ugly Duckling, 2012), Way Too West (Bootstrap, 2015) and Out of Print (City Lights).

In 2005, he published an experimental newspaper novel, Living! Go and Dream (Ugly Duckling). A poetry album Higher in Canada appeared on SoundCloud in 2016.

Poirier is a founding member of the Brooklyn-based non-profit Ugly Duckling Presse Collective. He was also editor of the newspaper New York Nights from 2001 to 2006. He is the editor of an anthology of writing by Jack Micheline, One of a Kind (Ugly Duckling, 2008), and a book of travel journals by Bill Berkson, Invisible Oligarchs (Ugly Duckling, 2016). With Garrett Caples he co-edited Frank Lima's Incidents of Travel in Poetry: New and Selected Poems. (City Lights, 2015).

== See also ==
- List of poets from the United States
