= Jack Stadler =

Jack Stadler (died 12 November 2010) was an American philanthropist and core member of the Poetry Society of America being their treasurer from 1966 to 1994. He is most known for winning the Robert Frost Medal in 1984.

== Life ==
In 1940, he graduated from Bucknell University.

Stadler was active in the Poetry Society of America, being a board member since 1961 later becoming treasurer for the society in 1964, retaining the position until 1994.

In 1968, Stadler established the Cecil Hemley Memorial Award.

In 1981, he founded the Poet-in-Residence Program and the Bucknell Poetry Seminars for Young Poets at Bucknell University in Lewisburg, Pennsylvania. The Stadler Center for Poetry, located in the university's Bucknell Hall, was dedicated to him in 1988.

In 1984, he was appointed to the Westchester Community College Foundation Board of Directors, serving as chairperson for eight years. He would also go on to win the Robert Frost Medal in recognition of his distinguished service to literature in the same year.

The Griot-Stadler Prize for Poetry, an award for unpublished poetry manuscripts by a black US poet who has previously published at least one book of poetry, is named after him.
