= Nos: Book of the Resurrection =

1980 book by Miguel Serrano

- Cover of the first English edition
- Author: Miguel Serrano
- Original title: Nos: Libro de la Resurrección
- Language: Spanish
- Publisher: Editorial Kier
- Publication date: 1980
- Publication place: Buenos Aires
- Media type: Print
- Pages: 203
- OCLC: 17080814

Nos: Book of the Resurrection (Spanish: Nos: Libro de la Resurrección) is a book by Chilean diplomat Miguel Serrano. The author states in the introduction: "it is neither a poem, nor a novel, nor a philosophical essay, although it contains a little of each of these."

== Depiction of Lucifer and identifications ==
In it Lucifer is defined as he "whom others have called" Apollo, Abraxas, Shiva, and Quetzalcoatl, also Odin-Wotan (and to the Cathars, Luci-Bel). "He came down from the Morning Star, Venus." As leader of the losing side of a stellar battle, he descended to the North Pole where he founded Ultima Thule, the capital of Hyperborea. The Grail is identified as having been a jewel which fell from his crown (broken by the sword of the enemy during his battle in the heavens). "He is the God of the Defeated Ones in the Kaliyuga" and "the supreme Guide of the Pilgrims of the Dawn" who will be the victor "when the Golden Age returns."

== Publication and illustrations ==
The book was published in Spanish in 1980, in a 203 page edition by Editorial Kier in Buenos Aires. The book was published in English by Routledge & Kegan Paul in 1984 (ISBN 0-7100-9828-6, pbk). It contains illustrations drawn by Wolfgang vom Schemm. In it are reproduced lines and poems by Irene Klatt, Omar Cáceres, William Blake, Hölderlin, Rilke, Shelley, D. H. Lawrence, Rabindranath Tagore, Leopardi, Virgil, and Ezra Pound's translation of poems of the troubadour Bertran de Born.

== Analysis ==
Nicholas Goodrick-Clarke described it as "a Jungian autobiography based on similar themes and Nietzsche’s idea of eternal return". He noted it as published during a period of Serrano's career where he was "devot[ing] himself to a poetic treatment of religious myths", which also produced the prior book, El/Ella: Book of Magic Love. Journalist Kevin Coogan described it as a "strange mystical book"; he noted that in Nos, Serrano discussed cryptically his ties to the far-right group the New European Order. He called it "a remarkable glimpse into the esoteric mythology of groups like the New European Order."
