= Ugly Duckling Presse =

American nonprofit art and publishing collective

- Founded: 1993
- Founder: UDP Collective
- Country of origin: United States
- Headquarters location: Brooklyn, New York
- Distribution: Small Press Distribution
- Publication types: Books
- Official website: www.uglyducklingpresse.org

Ugly Duckling Presse is an American nonprofit art and publishing collective based in Brooklyn, New York City. It publishes poetry, translations, experimental prose, performance texts, and books by artists.

== History ==
Through the efforts of the volunteer editorial collective, UDP has published more than 500 titles to date from the late 1990s to the present.

A micro press and a non-profit, UDP innovated distribution methods not traditionally seen in publishing, such as subscriptions, and gathered its early audience with guerrilla marketing techniques.

== Publications ==
Ugly Duckling Presse (UDP) focuses on new, international, and "forgotten" writers, and specializes in projects which may be difficult to produce at other presses. Formats produced include full-length books, chapbooks, and broadsides. The publications often contain handmade elements and letterpress covers.

Ugly Duckling Press specializes in the publication of chapbooks. The print run for the chapbooks is low, varying from 50 to 650 copies. Because the paper chapbooks are printed in small numbers, the press keeps a digital copy of the out-of-print chapbooks that is available on its web site.

Past publications include Nets by Jen Bervin, erasure poetry of Shakespeare's sonnets, Poker by Tomaž Šalamun (which was a finalist for the PEN Award for Poetry in Translation) and works by New York-based writers Steve Dalachinsky and Lewis Warsh. The Presse also publishes a regular series of translations of Latin American poetry.

As of 2007, Ugly Duckling Presse also created "paperless" works in collaboration with various visual and performance artists. These may be performed, or produced through media such as digital video, CD, or tree bark.

== Premises and personnel ==
The Presse maintains a workshop and letterpress studio in the Gowanus neighborhood in the industrial complex of The Old American Can Factory on the Fourth Street Basin of the Gowanus Canal in Brooklyn. Its current editors, as of 2024, are Yelena Gluzman, Anna Moschovakis, Daniel Owen, Kyra Simone, Rebekah Smith, Lee Norton, Chuck Kuan, Silvina López Medin, Marine Cornuet, Serena Solin, and Milo Wippermann.

Past editors are Matvei Yankelevich, Katherine Bogden, Michael Newton, Abraham Adams, Emmalea Russo, David Jou, Phil Cordelli, G. L. Ford, Ellie Ga, Ryan Haley, James Hoff, Marisol Limon Martinez, Filip Marinovich, Julien Poirier, Linda Trimbath, and Genya Turovskaya.

== See also ==
- Futurepoem Books
