= Gustaf Sobin =

American poet

Gustaf Sobin (November 15, 1935 – July 7, 2005) was a U.S.-born poet and author who spent most of his adult life in France. Originally from Boston, Sobin attended the Choate School, Brown University, and moved to Paris in 1962. Eventually he settled in the village of Goult, Provence, where he remained for over forty years, publishing more than a dozen books of poetry, four novels, a children's story, and two compilations of essays.

Sobin maintained his expatriate status until his death in July, 2005 of pancreatic cancer at the age of 69.

== Life and work ==
After studies with René Char, Gustaf Sobin developed a poetic style that relies heavily on assonance and consonance, as well as other methods of the sonic organization of speech. He published many books across different genres: fiction, essays, and translations (including a translation of Henri Michaux's Ideograms in China, a prose poem about Chinese orthography). More recent translations include The Brittle Age and Returning Upland, two volumes from Char's work of the mid to late 1960s that Sobin chose to translate in full, published posthumously in 2009, side by side with Char's French text.

Among his many books are Breath's Burials (poetry, New Directions, 1995), Luminous Debris (essays, University of California, 1999) and Ladder of Shadows (essays, University of California Press, 2008), and Collected Poetry (2010). Among his works of fiction are the novels The Fly Truffler (about the art of truffle-hunting in Southern France), and In Pursuit of a Vanishing Star, which is a chronicle of a brief period of Greta Garbo's early acting career.

Gustaf Sobin was survived by his wife, Susannah Bott, his daughter Esther, his son Gabriel, an older brother Harris (now deceased), of Phoenix, Arizona, and his devoted cousin, Mikki Ansin of Cambridge, Massachusetts. Sobin's brother Harris, an architect and architectural historian, designed the rehabilitation of Gustaf Sobin's residence and two additions for a historic stone cocoonery in Provence, France.

Before his death, Sobin named U.S. poets Andrew Joron and Andrew Zawacki as the co-executors of his literary estate. His friend Michael Ignatieff contributed a foreword to a posthumous collection of his essays, Ladder of Shadows.

== Select bibliography ==
- The Tale of the Yellow Triangle. With illustrations by Jolaine Meyer and text by Gustaf Sobin. G. Braziller (1973).
- Gustaf Sobin. A reading, February 7, 1996, in the Modern Languages Auditorium, sponsored by The University of Arizona Poetry Center.
- Ideograms in China. Henri Michaux, translated from the French by Gustaf Sobin. New Directions (2002).
- The Brittle Age and Returning Upland. Rene Char. Translated by Gustaf Sobin. Counterpath (2009).

Poetry

- Wind Chrysalid's Rattle. Montemora Supplement NY, 1980.
- Caesurae: Midsummer. Blue Guitar Books/Shearsman Supplement, Kuala Lumpur, Malaysia, 1981.
- Celebration of the Sound Through. Montemora Supplement, NY, 1982.
- Carnets 1979-1982. Shearsman Books, 1984.
- Nile. Oasis/Shearsman, London UK, 1984.
- The Earth As Air. New Directions, NY, 1984.
- Miniatures. (Cadmus Editions, San Francisco, 1986: 200 copies, privately distributed)
- Voyaging Portraits. New Directions, NY, 1988.
- Blown Letters, Driven Alphabets. Shearsman Books, Plymouth, UK, 1994.
- Breath's Burials. New Directions, NY, 1995.
- By the Bias of Sound: Selected Poems 1974-1994. Talisman House, Jersey City, NJ, 1995.
- A World of Letters: Poems. Arcturus Editions (1998).
- Towards the Blanched Alphabets (Talisman House, 1998. 123pp, h/c & pb)
- Articles of Light & Elation (Cadmus, 1998. 50pp)
- In the Name of the Neither (Talisman House, 2002. 57pp, pb)
- The Places as Preludes (Talisman House, 2005, 76pp, pb)
- Collected Poems (Talisman House, 2010, 756pp, pb)

Prose, fiction & essays

- Venus Blue (Bloomsbury, London, 1991, out of print) - novel
- Dark Mirrors (Bloomsbury, 1992, out of print) - novel
- The Fly-Truffler (Norton, New York, 1999) - novel
- Luminous Debris: Reflecting on Vestige in Provence and Languedoc (University of California Press, 1999. 247pp, pb) - essays
- In Pursuit of a Vanishing Star (Norton, NY, 2002) - novel
- Ladder of Shadows: Reflecting on Medieval Vestige in Provence and Languedoc (University of California Press, 2009. 208pp. pb, hc) - essays- companion volume to Luminous Debris
- Aura: Last Essays. Counterpath, 2009.
