= Andrew Joron =

American writer of experimental poetry

- Born: March 6, 1955 (age 71) San Antonio, Texas, US
- Occupation: Writer, teacher, musician
- Period: 1977–present
- Genres: experimental poetry, speculative fiction

Andrew Joron (born March 6, 1955) is an American writer of experimental poetry, speculative fiction, and lyrical and critical essays. He began by writing science fiction poetry. Joron's later poetry, combining scientific and philosophical ideas with the sonic properties of language, has been compared to the work of the Russian Futurist Velimir Khlebnikov. Joron currently lives in the San Francisco Bay Area. In fall 2014, Joron joined the faculty of the Creative Writing Department at San Francisco State University.

He has won the Rhysling Award three times: for Best Long Poem in 1980 and 1986, and for Best Short Poem in 1978; and the Gertrude Stein Award twice, in 1996 and 2006.

Joron's poetry is included in two W. W. Norton anthologies: American Hybrid (2009), edited by Cole Swensen and David St. John, and Postmodern American Poetry (2013), edited by Paul Hoover.

Joron is the translator, from the German, of the Marxist-Utopian philosopher Ernst Bloch’s Literary Essays which was published by Stanford University Press in 1998. Joron is also the translator of The Perpetual Motion Machine by the German fantasist Paul Scheerbart (Wakefield Press, 2011).

During the 1990s, Andrew Joron formed a close friendship with the poet and novelist Gustaf Sobin. Sobin, who died in 2005, designated Joron as his literary co-executor, along with American poet Andrew Zawacki.

Joron also belonged to the circle of Surrealist poet Philip Lamantia in San Francisco from the late '90s until Lamantia's death in 2005. Joron later served as co-editor, with Garrett Caples and Nancy Joyce Peters, of the Collected Poems of Philip Lamantia, published by University of California Press (2013).

Since 2008 he has played theremin in various free-improv and ambient-music ensembles, including Cloud Shepherd and Crow Crash Radio. Joron has written an essay, "The Theremin in My Life," on the relation between his literary and musical activities.

In 2017, Joron performed on theremin in Blood of the Air, Sheldon Brown's composition based on the pitch patterns of poet Philip Lamantia's voice.

In 2019, Joron performed on theremin with Will Alexander on piano and Anne Waldman reading her poetry at the Entanglements conference on science and poetry held at Wake Forest University in North Carolina.

In 2022, Joron returned to the science-fiction genre with the publication of O0 by Black Square Editions.

In 2019, the Japanese composer Akari Komura set the text of Joron's poem "The Phrases of the Moon" (from his book The Absolute Letter) to music. The score, for violin and mezzo-sporano, was performed at University of California, Irvine, in 2019.

In 2023, a French death-metal band, Deathcode Society, used Joron's poem "Mazed Interior" (from his book The Sound Mirror) as the lyrics to a song on their album Unlightenment.

== List of books ==
- Force Fields. Borgo Press, 1987.
- Velocities Set (editor). Ocean View Books, 1988.
- Science Fiction. Pantograph Press, 1992.
- Terminal Velocities (editor). Pantograph Press, 1993.
- Invisible Machines with Robert Frazier and Thomas Wiloch. Jazz Police Books, 1997.
- The Removes. Hard Press, 1999.
- The emergency of poetry. Velocities, 2002.
- Fathom. Black Square Editions, 2003.
- Neo-surrealism: Or, The Sun At Night. Black Square Editions, 2004.
- The Cry at Zero: Selected Prose. Counterpath Press, 2007.
- The Sound Mirror. Flood Editions, 2008.
- Force Fields with Brian Lucas. Hooke Press, 2010. (This is a different book than Joron's 1987 book of the same title.)
- Trance Archive: New and Selected Poems. City Lights Books, 2010. ISBN 978-0-87286-530-3
- The Absolute Letter. Flood Editions, 2017. ISBN 978-0-9981695-0-7
- O0. Black Square Editions, 2022. ISBN 978-1-7363248-7-5 (a book of speculative fiction consisting of two linked novellas)
- The Exponential Stone: Essays and Interviews. MadHat Press, 2026 ISBN 978-1-968422-12-7
