= Robert Hass =

American poet (born 1941)

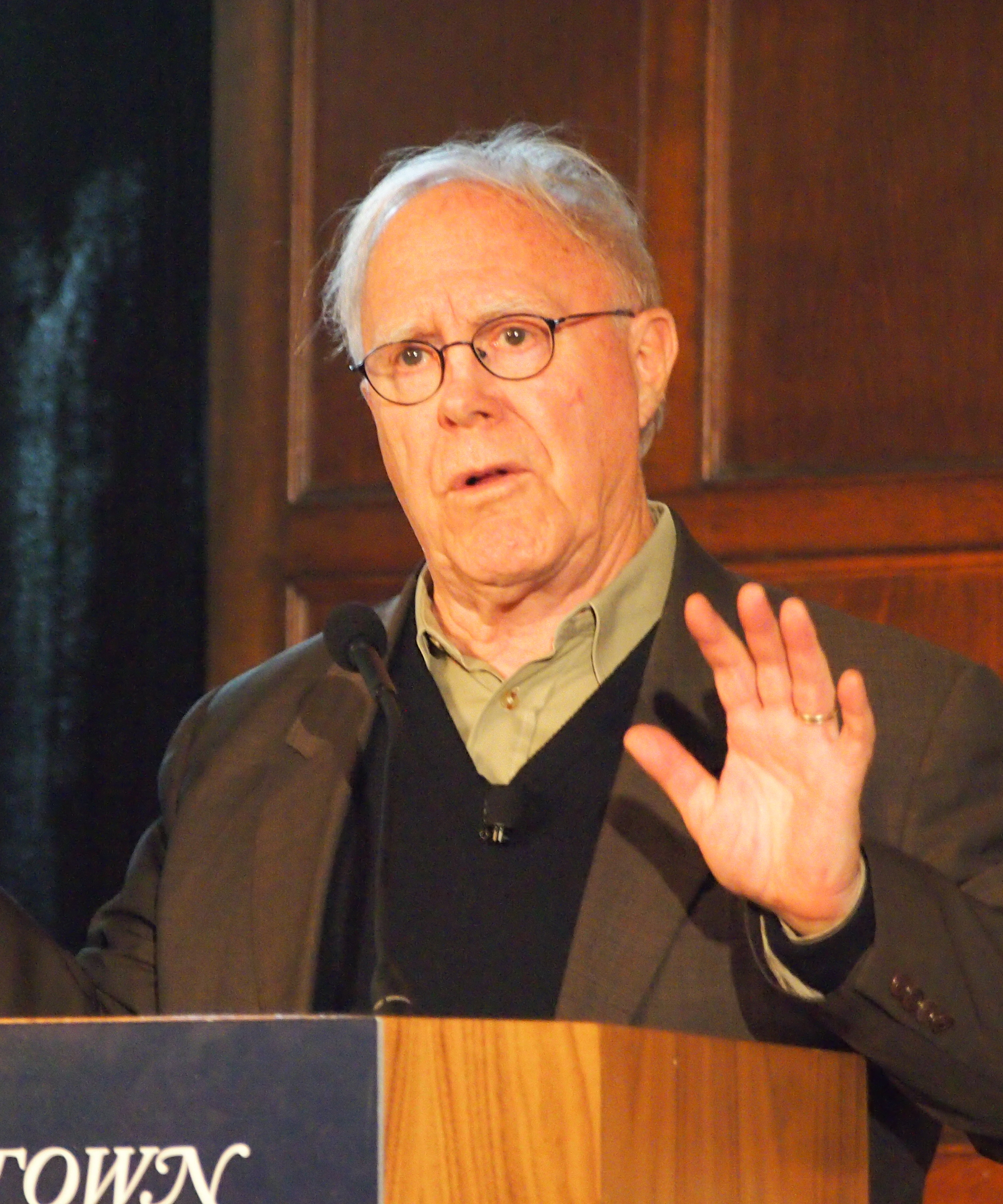
- Hass in 2015
- Born: March 1, 1941 (age 85); San Francisco, California
- Education: Saint Mary's College of California (BA); Stanford University (MA, PhD)
- Spouse: Brenda Hillman
- Writing career
- Notable works: Time and Materials: Poems 1997–2005.; "Meditation at Lagunitas"
- Notable awards: Poet Laureate of the United States; National Book Award; Pulitzer Prize for Poetry; MacArthur Fellowship

Robert L. Hass (born March 1, 1941) is an American poet. He served as Poet Laureate of the United States from 1995 to 1997. He won the 2007 National Book Award and shared the 2008 Pulitzer Prize for Poetry for the collection Time and Materials: Poems 1997–2005. In 2014 he was awarded the Wallace Stevens Award from the Academy of American Poets.

== Life ==
Hass's works are well known for their West Coast subjects and attitudes. He was born in San Francisco and grew up in San Rafael. He grew up with an alcoholic mother, a major topic in the 1996 poem collection Sun Under Wood. His older brother encouraged him to dedicate himself to his writing. Awestruck by Gary Snyder and Allen Ginsberg, among others in the 1950s Bay Area poetry scene, Hass entertained the idea of becoming a beatnik. He graduated from Marin Catholic High School in 1958. When the area became influenced by East Asian literary techniques, such as haiku, Hass took many of these influences up in his poetry. He has been hailed as "a lyrical virtuoso who is able to turn even cooking recipes into poetry".

Hass is married to the poet and antiwar activist Brenda Hillman, who is a professor at Saint Mary's College of California.

== Career ==
Hass graduated from Saint Mary's College in Moraga, California in 1963, and received his MA and Ph.D. in English from Stanford University in 1965 and 1971 respectively.

From 1995 to 1997, during Hass's two terms as the US Poet Laureate (Poet Laureate Consultant in Poetry to the Library of Congress), he became a champion of literacy, poetry, and ecological awareness. He criss-crossed the country lecturing in places as diverse as corporate boardrooms and for civic groups, or as he has said, "places where poets don't go." After his self-described "act of citizenship," he wrote a weekly column on poetry in The Washington Post until 2000. He serves as a chancellor of the Academy of American Poets, was a trustee of the Griffin Poetry Prize (now trustee emeritus), and works actively for literacy and the environment. He is currently a professor emeritus of poetry at UC Berkeley.

== Poetry ==
Hass's poems tend to vary in structure as he alternates between prose-like blocks and free verse. His poems have been said to have a stylistic clarity, seen in his simple, clear language and precise imagery. His collection Praise features themes of seasons, nature, location, and transformation, with a running motif of blackberries. Poet Stanley Kunitz said of Hass's work, "Reading a poem by Robert Hass is like stepping into the ocean when the temperature of the water is not much different from that of the air. You scarcely know, until you feel the undertow tug at you, that you have entered into another element."

The January 2017 "Gift Horse" episode of the TV series Madam Secretary alludes to Hass. At a presidential inauguration, the poet laureate character ("Roland Hobbs") recites a poem that describes "the privilege of being", an allusion to Hass's 1999 poem of that title.

Hass cites Beat poet Lew Welch as a major influence on his poetry and has praised the slogan "Raid Kills Bugs Dead," which Welch crafted while working for an advertising firm.

== Activism ==
Hass has actively promoted ecoliteracy. In 1995 he began working with writer and environmentalist Pamela Michael on a program that encourages "children to make art and poetry about their watersheds" and fosters interdisciplinary environmental education. In April 1996, when he was poet laureate, he organized a six-day conference at the Library of Congress that brought together American nature writers to celebrate writing, the natural world, and community.

On November 9, 2011, while Hass was participating in an Occupy movement demonstration at UC Berkeley called Occupy Cal, a police officer hit him in the ribs with a baton.

== Awards and honors ==
=== Literary awards ===
Year	Work	Award	Category	Result	Ref
1972	Field Guide	Yale Series of Younger Poets	—	Won	
1979	Praise	William Carlos Williams Award	—	Won	
1984	Twentieth Century Pleasures	National Book Critics Circle Award	Criticism	Won	
1989	Human Wishes	National Book Critics Circle Award	Poetry	Shortlisted	
	Sun Under Wood	National Book Award	Poetry	Shortlisted	
1996	Sun Under Wood	National Book Critics Circle Award	Poetry	Won	
2007	Time and Materials	National Book Award	Poetry	Won	
2008	Time and Materials	Pulitzer Prize	Poetry	Won	
2013	What Light Can Do	PEN/Diamonstein-Spielvogel Award for the Art of the Essay	—	Won	
2018	A Little Book on Form: An Exploration into the Formal Imagination of Poetry	Truman Capote Award for Literary Criticism	—	Won	

=== Honors ===
- The Frost Place poet in residence (1978)
- MacArthur Fellowship, 1984
- Manhae Prize co-winner, 2009
- Wallace Stevens Award, 2014

== Published works ==
=== Poetry ===
- —— (1973). Field Guide. Yale University Press. ISBN 9780300016505.
- —— (1979). Praise. Ecco Press. ISBN 9780912946610.
- —— (1989). Human Wishes. Ecco Press. ISBN 9780880012119.
- —— (1996). Sun Under Wood. Ecco Press. ISBN 9780880014687.
- —— (2007). Time and Materials: Poems 1997–2005. Ecco Press. ISBN 9780061349607.
- —— (2010). The Apple Trees at Olema: New and Selected Poems. Ecco Press. ISBN 9780061923821.
- —— (2020). Summer Snow: New Poems. Ecco Press. ISBN 9780062950024.

=== Criticism ===
- —— (1984). Twentieth Century Pleasures: Prose on Poetry. Ecco Press. ISBN 9780880010450.
- —— (2007). Now and Then: The Poet's Choice Columns, 1997–2000. Shoemaker & Hoard. ISBN 9781593761462.
- —— (2012). What Light Can Do: Essays on Art, Imagination, and the Natural World. Ecco Press. ISBN 9780061923920.
- —— (2017). A Little Book on Form: An Exploration into the Formal Imagination of Poetry. Ecco Press. ISBN 9780062332424.

==== Contributions ====
- —— (1982). "James Wright". In Dave Smith (ed.). The Pure Clear Word: Essays on the Poetry of James Wright. University of Illinois Press. ISBN 9780252008764.
- —— (2002). "Edward Taylor: What Was He Up To?". In Jonathan F. S. Post (ed.). Green Thoughts, Green Shades: Essays by Contemporary Poets on the Early Modern Lyric. University of California Press. ISBN 9780520214552.

=== Translations ===
- The Separate Notebooks, Czesław Miłosz (translated by Robert Hass and Robert Pinsky with the author and Renata Gorczynski), New York: Ecco Press, 1984, ISBN 9780880010313
- Unattainable Earth, Czesław Miłosz (translated by author and Robert Hass), New York: Ecco Press, 1986, ISBN 9780880010986
- Provinces, Czesław Miłosz (translated by author and Robert Hass), Hopewell, NJ: Ecco Press, 1991, ISBN 9780880013215
- The Essential Haiku: Versions of Bashō, Buson, and Issa, Bashō Matsuo, Buson Yosano, Issa Kobayashi (edited with verse translation by Robert Hass), Hopewell, NJ: Ecco Press, 1994, ISBN 9780880013727
- Facing the River: new poems, Czesław Miłosz (translated by author and Robert Hass), Hopewell, NJ: Ecco Press, 1995, ISBN 9780880014045
- Road-Side Dog, Czesław Miłosz (translated by author and Robert Hass), New York: Farrar, Straus and Giroux, 1998, ISBN 9780374251291
- Treatise on Poetry, Czesław Miłosz (translated by author and Robert Hass), New York: Ecco Press, 2001, ISBN 9780060185244
- Second Space: new poems, Czesław Miłosz (translated by author and Robert Hass), New York: Ecco Press, 2004, ISBN 9780060745660
- The Essential Neruda: Selected Poems, includes five translations by Robert Hass, San Francisco: City Lights 2004, ISBN 9780872864283
