= Toi Derricotte =

American poet

- Born: Toinette Webster; April 12, 1941 (age 85); Hamtramck, Michigan, U.S.
- Education: Wayne State University; New York University
- Occupations: Poet, Professor emerita
- Writing career
- Notable work: Black Notebooks
- Notable awards: Wallace Stevens Award (2021), Frost Medal (2020)
- Website: toiderricotte.com

Toi Derricotte (pronounced DARE-ah-cot ) (born April 12, 1941) is an American poet. She is the author of six poetry collections and a literary memoir. She has won numerous literary awards, including the 2020 Frost Medal for distinguished lifetime achievement in poetry awarded by the Poetry Society of America, and the 2021 Wallace Stevens Award, sponsored by the Academy of American Poets. From 2012 to 2017, Derricotte served as a Chancellor of the Academy of American Poets. She is currently a professor emerita in writing at the University of Pittsburgh. Derricotte is a member of The Wintergreen Women Writers Collective.

== Early life ==
The only child of Benjamin and Antonia (néa Baquet) Webster, Toi Derricotte was born Toinette Webster on April 12, 1941, in Hamtramck, Michigan. Her parents divorced when she was a teenager. A Catholic, she attended Girls Catholic Central High School in Detroit, where she graduated in 1959. She went to Mass every day.

She later attended Wayne State University, where she studied psychology, but her studies were interrupted by an unplanned pregnancy, and her marriage to artist Clarence Reese. Their son Anthony was born in 1962. The couple later divorced. Derricotte changed her studies to Special Education and graduated with a BA degree in 1965.

== Career ==
Derricotte worked in Detroit for Manpower Inc. from 1964 to 1966 and at the Farand School from 1966 to 1968. She married Bruce Derricotte in 1967. They later moved to New Jersey, where she worked as a teacher and participated in a special program, teaching poetry to students from kindergarten through high school. With easy access to New York City, Derricotte participated in writing workshops and began writing each day.

Derricotte published her first poetry collection, The Empress of the Death House (Lotus Press), in 1978. In 1983, Firebrand Books published her second poetry collection, Natural Birth. In 1984, she won a poetry fellowship from the National Endowment for the Arts, and a MacDowell fellowship. She went on to earn an MA degree in English Literature from New York University. In 1989, the University of Pittsburgh Press published Dericotte's third poetry collection, Captivity. The collection had second (1991) and third (1993) printings.

In 1991, Derricotte became an associate professor at the University of Pittsburgh. In 1996, Norton Publishing Company accepted for publication Derricotte's literary memoir, The Black Notebooks, An Interior Journey, a book she began in 1974 when her family became one of the first black families to move into Upper Montclair, New Jersey. The memoir won the 1998 Anisfield-Wolf Book Award for Non-Fiction.

Derricotte co-founded the Cave Canem Foundation, a national poetry organization in 1996, with American writer, Cornelius Eady. Cave Canem is a national poetry organization that supports the professional growth of African- American poets. In 2016, she and Eady accepted the National Book Foundation's Literarian Award for Outstanding Service to the American Literary Community on behalf of Cave Canem.

The University of Pittsburgh Press published Derricotte's fourth, fifth and sixth poetry collections: Tender in 1997, The Undertaker's Daughter in 2011, and "I": New and Selected Poems in 2019. In October 2019, "I": New and Selected Poems was longlisted for the National Book Award for Poetry.

In 2012, Derricotte was elected a Chancellor of the Academy of American Poets, and served in the role from 2012 until 2017. She is currently a professor emerita in writing at the University of Pittsburgh.

== Awards and recognition ==
- Lucille Medwick Memorial Award (1985)
- Paterson Poetry Prize, Tender (1998)
- Anisfield-Wolf Book Award for Non-Fiction, The Black Notebooks, An Interior Journey, (1998)
- Pen/Voelker Award, The Undertaker's Daughter (2012)
- National Book Award for Poetry, "I": New and Selected Poems, finalist (2019)
- Frost Medal, Distinguished Lifetime Achievement in Poetry (2020)
- Wallace Stevens Award, The Blue Nightgown (2021)
- Honorary Doctor of Arts from Northwestern University (2025)

== Selected bibliography ==
Collections

- The Empress of the Death House (Lotus Press, 1978)
- Natural Birth (Firebrand Books, 1983)
- Captivity (University of Pittsburgh Press, 1989)
- Tender (University of Pittsburgh Press, 1997)
- The Undertaker's Daughter ((University of Pittsburgh Press, 2011)
- "I": New and Selected Poems (University of Pittsburgh Press, 2019)

=== Non-fiction ===
- The Black Notebooks: An Interior Journey (W.W. Norton, 1997)
- Toi Derricotte; Cornelius Eady; Camille T. Dungy, eds. (1 January 2006). Gathering Ground: A Reader Celebrating Cave Canem's First Decade. University of Michigan Press. ISBN 0-472-06924-1.

=== Critical studies and reviews of Derricotte's work ===
- The Image and Identity of the Black Woman in the Poetry and Prose of Toi Derricotte by Dufer, Miriam D., MA.
