= Frost Medal =

The Frost Medal of the Poetry Society of America (PSA) is awarded annually, at the discretion of the Society’s Board of Governors, to honor distinguished lifetime achievement in American poetry. The award was originally known as the Gold Medal for Distinguished Achievement, and was later renamed in honor of American poet Robert Frost on the centennial of his birth. The medal was established in 1930, the winner also receives $2,500. The nomination process is confined to the PSA.

The Frost Medal should not be confused with a gold Robert Frost Medal that was presented by the United States Congress to Frost himself in the early 1960s. and Robert Frost medals issued by the State of Vermont.

== Recipients ==
=== 2020s ===
- 2026 – Mei-mei Berssenbrugge
- 2025 – Nikki Giovanni
- 2024 – Joy Harjo
- 2023 – Juan Felipe Herrera
- 2022 – Sharon Olds
- 2021 – N. Scott Momaday
- 2020 – Toi Derricotte

=== 2010s ===
- 2019 – Eleanor Wilner
- 2018 – Ron Padgett
- 2017 – Susan Howe
- 2016 – Grace Schulman
- 2015 – Kamau Brathwaite
- 2014 – Gerald Stern
- 2013 – Robert Bly
- 2012 – Marilyn Nelson
- 2011 – Charles Simic
- 2010 – Lucille Clifton

=== 2000s ===
- 2009 – X. J. Kennedy
- 2008 – Michael S. Harper
- 2007 – John Hollander
- 2006 – Maxine Kumin
- 2005 – Marie Ponsot
- 2004 – Richard Howard
- 2003 – Lawrence Ferlinghetti
- 2002 – Galway Kinnell
- 2001 – Sonia Sanchez
- 2000 – Anthony Hecht

=== 1990s ===
- 1999 – Barbara Guest
- 1998 – Stanley Kunitz
- 1997 – Josephine Jacobsen
- 1996 – Richard Wilbur
- 1995 – John Ashbery
- 1994 – A. R. Ammons
- 1993 – William Stafford
- 1992 – Adrienne Rich
- 1992 – David Ignatow
- 1991 – Donald Hall
- 1990 – Denise Levertov
- 1990 – James Laughlin

=== 1980s ===
- 1989 – Gwendolyn Brooks
- 1988 – Carolyn Kizer
- 1987 – Robert Creeley
- 1987 – Sterling Brown
- 1986 – Allen Ginsberg
- 1986 – Richard Eberhart
- 1985 – Robert Penn Warren
- 1984 – Jack Stadler

=== Earlier recipients ===
- 1976 – A. M. Sullivan
- 1974 – John Hall Wheelock
- 1971 – Melville Cane
- 1967 – Marianne Moore
- 1955 – Leonora Speyer
- 1952 – Carl Sandburg
- 1951 – Wallace Stevens
- 1947 – Gustav Davidson
- 1943 – Edna St. Vincent Millay
- 1942 – Edgar Lee Masters
- 1941 – Robert Frost
- 1930 – Jessie Rittenhouse
- 1930 – George Edward Woodberry (posthumous)
- 1930 – Bliss Carman (posthumous)

=== Years not awarded ===
- 1931–1940
- 1944–1946
- 1948–1950
- 1953–1954
- 1956–1966
- 1968–1970
- 1972–1973
- 1975
- 1977–1983

== Sources ==
- Leckey, Susan (December 22, 2015). The Europa Directory of Literary Awards and Prizes. Routledge. ISBN 978-1-135-35632-3.
- US Congress (1960). Reports and Documents 1959-1960. Vol. 29.
