= Richard Wilbur =

American poet (1921–2017)

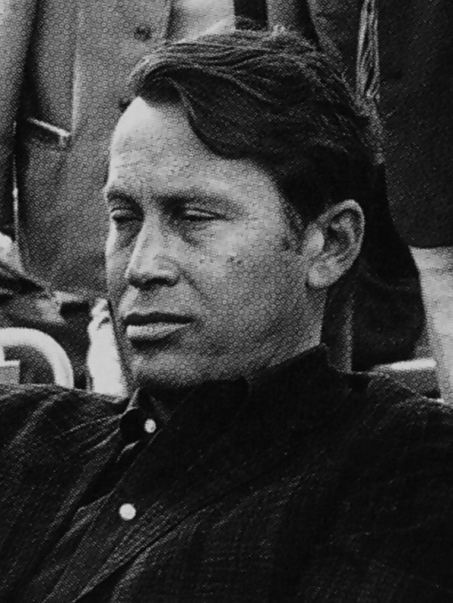
- Wilbur in 1964
- Born: Richard Purdy Wilbur; March 1, 1921; New York City, New York, U.S.
- Died: October 14, 2017 (aged 96); Belmont, Massachusetts, U.S.
- Education: Amherst College (BA); Harvard University (MA)
- Occupation: Poet
- Spouse: Mary Hayes Ward (1942–2007)
- Children: 4
- Writing career
- Genres: Poetry, children's books, drama, French literature
- Notable work: Things of This World
- Notable awards: Pulitzer Prize for Poetry (1957, 1989); Robert Frost Medal (1996)
- Movement: Formalism

Richard Purdy Wilbur (March 1, 1921 – October 14, 2017) was an American poet and literary translator, and one of the foremost poets of the World War II generation. Wilbur's work, often employing rhyme, and composed primarily in traditional forms, was marked by its wit, charm, and gentlemanly elegance. He was acclaimed in his youth as the heir to Robert Frost, translated the verse dramas of Moliere, Corneille, and Racine into rhymed English, collaborated with Leonard Bernstein as the lyricist for the opera Candide, and in his old age acted, particularly through his role in the annual West Chester University Poetry Conference, as a mentor to the younger poets of the New Formalist movement. He was appointed the second Poet Laureate Consultant in Poetry to the Library of Congress in 1987 and received the Pulitzer Prize for Poetry twice, in 1957 and 1989.

== Early years ==
Wilbur was born in New York City on March 1, 1921, and grew up in North Caldwell, New Jersey. In 1938 he graduated from Montclair High School, where he worked on the school newspaper. At Amherst College, he also displayed his "ample literary gifts" as one of the "sharpest" reporters for the college newspaper, edited by upperclassman Robert Morgenthau. After graduation in 1942, he served in the United States Army from 1943 to 1945 during World War II. He attended graduate school at Harvard University. Wilbur taught at Wellesley College, then Wesleyan University for two decades and at Smith College for another decade. At Wesleyan he was instrumental in founding the award-winning poetry series of the Wesleyan University Press. He received two Pulitzer Prizes for Poetry and taught at Amherst College as late as 2009, where he also served on the editorial board of the literary magazine The Common.

== Literary career ==
When only eight years old, Wilbur published his first poem in John Martin's Magazine. His first book, The Beautiful Changes and Other Poems, appeared in 1947. Thereafter he published several volumes of poetry, including New and Collected Poems (Faber, 1989). Wilbur was also a translator, specializing in the 17th century French comedies of Molière and dramas of Jean Racine. His translation of Tartuffe has become the play's standard English version and has been presented on television twice (a 1978 production is available on DVD). Wilbur also published several children's books, including Opposites, More Opposites, and The Disappearing Alphabet. In 1959 he became the general editor of The Laurel Poetry Series (Dell Publishing).

Continuing the tradition of Robert Frost and W. H. Auden, Wilbur's poetry finds illumination in everyday experiences. Less well-known is Wilbur's foray into writing theatre lyrics. He provided lyrics to several songs in Leonard Bernstein's 1956 musical Candide, including the famous "Glitter and Be Gay" and "Make Our Garden Grow". He also produced several unpublished works, including "The Wing" and "To Beatrice".

His honors included the 1983 Drama Desk Special Award and the PEN Translation Prize for his translation of The Misanthrope, the Pulitzer Prize for Poetry and the National Book Award for Things of This World (1956), the Edna St Vincent Millay award, the Bollingen Prize, and the Chevalier, Ordre des Palmes Académiques. He was elected a Fellow of the American Academy of Arts and Sciences in 1959. In 1987 Wilbur became the second poet, after Robert Penn Warren, to be named U.S. Poet Laureate after the position's title was changed from Poetry Consultant. In 1988 he won the Aiken Taylor Award for Modern American Poetry and in 1989 he won a second Pulitzer, for his New and Collected Poems. On October 14, 1994, he received the National Medal of Arts from President Bill Clinton. He also received the PEN/Ralph Manheim Medal for Translation in 1994. In 2003 Wilbur was inducted into the American Theater Hall of Fame. In 2006 he won the Ruth Lilly Poetry Prize. In 2010 he won the National Translation Award for the translation of The Theatre of Illusion by Pierre Corneille. In 2012 Yale University conferred an honorary Doctor of Letters on Wilbur. He had a literary correspondence with Catholic nun, literary critic and poet M. Bernetta Quinn.

Wilbur died on October 14, 2017, at a nursing home in Belmont, Massachusetts, from natural causes aged 96.

== Awards and honors ==
During his lifetime, Wilbur received numerous awards in recognition of his work, including:

- Guggenheim Fellowship for Creative Arts (1952, 1963)
- Poetry Society of America Millay Award (1957)
- National Book Award for Poetry (1957) for Things of This World
- Pulitzer Prize for Poetry (1957, 1989) for Things of This World, New and Collected Poems
- Bollingen Prize for Poetry (1971)
- Shelley Memorial Award (1973)
- New York Drama Critics' Circle Award for Best Musical (1973–1974) for Candide
- Outer Critics Circle Award for Best Musical (1973–1974) for Candide
- Drama Desk Special Award (1983) for translation of The Misanthrope
- United States Poet Laureate (1987–1988)
- Laurence Olivier Award for Musical of the Year (1988) for Candide
- St. Louis Literary Award from the Saint Louis University Library Associates
- American Academy of Arts and Letters Gold Medal in Poetry (1991)
- Golden Plate Award of the American Academy of Achievement (1995)
- PEN/Ralph Manheim Medal for Translation (1994)
- Frost Medal (1996)
- Wallace Stevens Award (2003)
- Ruth Lilly Poetry Prize (2006)
- Edward MacDowell Medal (1992)

== Bibliography ==
=== Poetry collections ===
- 1947: The Beautiful Changes, and Other Poems
- 1950: Ceremony, and Other Poems
- 1955: A Bestiary
- 1956: Things of This World – won Pulitzer Prize for Poetry and National Book Award, both in 1957
- 1961: Advice to a Prophet, and Other Poems
- 1969: Walking to Sleep: New Poems and Translations
- 1976: The Mind-Reader: New Poems
- 1988: New and Collected Poems – won Pulitzer Prize for Poetry in 1989
- 2000: Mayflies: New Poems and Translations
- 2004: Collected Poems, 1943–2004
- 2010: Anterooms

=== Editor ===
- 2003 Edgar Allan Poe: Poems and Poetics

=== Selected poems available online ===
- "Some Words Inside of Words". The Atlantic. June 2004.
- "Sugar Maples, January". The New Yorker. January 16, 2012.
- "Walking to Sleep". Adrian Brinkerhoff Poetry Foundation. Archived from the original on June 8, 2026.

=== Prose collections ===
- 1976: Responses: Prose Pieces, 1953–1976
- 1997: The Catbird's Song: Prose Pieces, 1963–1995

=== Translated plays from other authors ===
==== Translated from Molière ====
- The Misanthrope (1955/1666)
- Tartuffe (1963/1669)
- The School for Wives (1971/1662)
- The Learned Ladies (1978/1672)
- The School for Husbands (1992/1661)
- The Imaginary Cuckold, or Sganarelle (1993/1660)
- Amphitryon (1995/1668)
- The Bungler (2000/1655)
- Don Juan (2001/1665)
- Lovers' Quarrels (2009/1656)
- Molière: The Complete Richard Wilbur Translations (2021)

==== From Jean Racine ====
- Andromache (1982/1667)
- Phaedra (1986/1677)
- The Suitors (2001/1668)

==== From Pierre Corneille ====
- The Theatre of Illusion (2007/1636)
- Le Cid (2009/1636)
- The Liar (2009/1643)
