= Cecil Hemley Memorial Award =

American poetry and philosophy award

The Cecil Hemley Memorial Award is given once a year to a member of the Poetry Society of America "for a lyric poem that addresses a philosophical or epistemological concern."

The award was established by Jack Stadler, the former Treasurer of the PSA, and his late wife, Ralynne Stadler. Cecil Hemley was a poet and a translator from the Yiddish.

Each winner receives a $500 prize.

== Winners ==
- 2001: Angie Estes, Judge: Lynn Emanuel
- 2002: Andrew Zawacki, Judge: Wayne Koestenbaum
- 2003: Lynn Veach Sadler, Judge:
- 2004: Fritz Ward, Judge: Susan Stewart
- 2005: G. C. Waldrep, Judge: Alice Notley
- 2006: Rusty Morrison, Judge: Cal Bedient
- 2007: Yerra Sugarman, Judge: Michael Palmer
- 2008: Brian Henry, Judge: Norma Cole
- 2009: Melissa Kwasny, Judge: Mei-mei Berssenbrugge
- 2010: Karla Kelsey, Judge: Forrest Gander
- 2011: Darcie Dennigan, Judge: Susan Wheeler
- 2012: Lily Brown, Judge: Zachary Schomburg
- 2013: Ted Mathys, Judge: Alice Notley
- 2014: Ari Banias, Judge: A.E. Stallings
- 2015: Jenny Browne, Judge: Rachel Zucker
- 2016: James Davis May, Judge: Laura Kasischke
- 2017: Jericho Brown, Judge: Elizabeth Willis
- 2018: Sarah Gridley, Judge: Meena Alexander
- 2019: Ari Banias, Judge: Kevin Killian
- 2020: Traci Brimhall, Judge: Sally Wen Mao
- 2021: Erika Meitner, Judge: Martha Collins
- 2022: Amy Dryansky, Judge: Ana Castillo
- 2023: Jane Huffman, Judge: Natalie Shapero
- 2024: C. Rees, Judge: Kathy Fagan
- 2025: Ansel Elkins, Judge: Alison C. Rollins

== See also ==
- Poetry Society of America
- List of American literary awards
- List of poetry awards
- List of years in poetry
