= List of winners of the Wallace Stevens Award =

List of winners of the Wallace Stevens Award. Originally named for its donor Dorothea Tanning, the Wallace Stevens Award was established in 1994 and is administered by the Academy of American Poets, to "recognize outstanding and proven mastery in the art of poetry"; it carries a prize of $100,000. Receipt of the prize has been among the distinctions noted by the Library of Congress when the Poet Laureate of the United States is named.

"It's a very sweet award, there's no doubt about that," 2004 winner Mark Strand said. "It's so meaningful to know that you're thought well enough of by your peers that they think you deserve something like this."

Year	Poet	Judges	Ref
2022	Marilyn Nelson		
2021	Toi Derricotte		
2020	Nikky Finney		
2019	Rita Dove		
2018	Sonia Sanchez		
2017	Jorie Graham	Elizabeth Alexander, Toi Derricotte, Ellen Bass, Forrest Gander, Linda Gregerson, Terrance Hayes, Brenda Hillman, Jane Hirshfield, Khaled Mattawa, Marilyn Nelson, Alicia Ostriker, Claudia Rankine, Alberto Ríos, David St. John, Arthur Sze	
2016	Sharon Olds	Elizabeth Alexander, Toi Derricotte, Mark Doty, Linda Gregerson, Brenda Hillman, Jane Hirshfield, Juan Felipe Herrera, Khaled Mattawa, Marilyn Nelson, Alicia Ostriker, Claudia Rankine, Alberto Ríos, Arthur Sze, Anne Waldman	
2015	Joy Harjo	Elizabeth Alexander, Toi Derricotte, Mark Doty, Linda Gregerson, Jane Hirshfield, Juan Felipe Herrera, Marilyn Nelson, Naomi Shihab Nye, Khaled Mattawa, Alicia Ostriker, Claudia Rankine, Alberto Ríos, Arthur Sze, C. D. Wright, Anne Waldman	
2014	Robert Hass	Victor Hernández Cruz, Toi Derricotte, Mark Doty, Marilyn Hacker, Juan Felipe Herrera, Edward Hirsch, Jane Hirshfield, Khaled Mattawa, Marilyn Nelson, Naomi Shihab Nye, Ron Padgett, Marie Ponsot, Claudia Rankine, Alberto Ríos, Arthur Sze, Anne Waldman, C. D. Wright	
2013	Philip Levine	Toi Derricotte, Mark Doty, Marilyn Hacker, Juan Felipe Herrera, Edward Hirsch, Jane Hirshfield, Marilyn Nelson, Naomi Shihab Nye, Marie Ponsot, Claudia Rankine, Arthur Sze, Anne Waldman, C. D. Wright	
2012	Gary Snyder	Victor Hernández Cruz, Toi Derricotte, Mark Doty, Marilyn Hacker, Lyn Hejinian, Edward Hirsch, Jane Hirshfield, Naomi Shihab Nye, Sharon Olds, Ron Padgett, Carl Phillips, Marie Ponsot, Arthur Sze, and Anne Waldman	
2011	Yusef Komunyakaa	Victor Hernández Cruz, Mark Doty, Rita Dove, Marilyn Hacker, Lyn Hejinian, Edward Hirsch, Naomi Shihab Nye, Sharon Olds, Ron Padgett, Carl Phillips, Marie Ponsot, Kay Ryan, Gerald Stern, and Anne Waldman	
2010	Galway Kinnell	Victor Hernández Cruz, Rita Dove, Marilyn Hacker, Lyn Hejinian, Edward Hirsch, Naomi Shihab Nye, Sharon Olds, Ron Padgett, Carl Phillips, Robert Pinsky, Marie Ponsot, Kay Ryan, Susan Stewart, Gerald Stern, and C. K. Williams	
2009	Jean Valentine	Frank Bidart, Victor Hernández Cruz, Rita Dove, Marilyn Hacker, Lyn Hejinian, Edward Hirsch, Sharon Olds, Ron Padgett, Carl Phillips, Robert Pinsky, Kay Ryan, Susan Stewart, Gerald Stern, Ellen Bryant Voigt, and C. K. Williams	
2008	Louise Glück	Frank Bidart, Victor Hernández Cruz, Rita Dove, Lyn Hejinian, Sharon Olds, Ron Padgett, Carl Phillips, Robert Pinsky, Kay Ryan, Gary Snyder, Susan Stewart, Gerald Stern, Ellen Bryant Voigt, and C. K. Williams	
2007	Charles Simic	Frank Bidart, Rita Dove, Robert Hass, Lyn Hejinian, Galway Kinnell, Nathaniel Mackey, Sharon Olds, Carl Phillips, Robert Pinsky, Kay Ryan, Gary Snyder, Gerald Stern, Susan Stewart, James Tate, Ellen Bryant Voigt, and C. K. Williams	
2006	Michael Palmer	Robert Hass, Fanny Howe, Susan Stewart, Arthur Sze, and Dean Young	
2005	Gerald Stern	Frank Bidart, Lucille Clifton, Toi Derricotte, Sharon Olds, and Kevin Young	
2004	Mark Strand	Rosanna Warren, Jonathan Aaron, W. S. DiPiero, Jane Hirshfield, Lynne McMahon	
2003	Richard Wilbur	Alice Fulton, Glyn Maxwell, Heather McHugh, C. K. Williams, and Al Young	
2002	Ruth Stone	Marie Howe, Galway Kinnell, Yusef Komunyakaa, Dorianne Laux, Philip Levine	
2001	John Ashbery	Charles Bernstein, Susan Howe, Harryette Mullen, Geoffrey O'Brien, Cole Swensen	
2000	Frank Bidart	Eavan Boland, Louise Glück, Wendy Lesser, James Longenbach, Carl Phillips	
1999	Jackson Mac Low	Frank Bidart, Robert Creeley, Sharon Olds, Marjorie Perloff, John Yau	
1998	A. R. Ammons	Edward Hirsch, Richard Howard, Stephen Sandy, Susan Stewart, Helen Vendler	
1997	Anthony Hecht	Harold Bloom, Debora Greger, John Hollander, Heather McHugh, Mark Strand	
1996	Adrienne Rich	Thom Gunn, Marilyn Hacker, Daniel Hoffman, David Wagoner, Rosanna Warren	
1995	James Tate	John Ashbery, Jorie Graham, Charles Simic	
1994	W. S. Merwin	James Merrill, Carolyn Kizer, J. D. McClatchy	
