= Meditation at Lagunitas =

Poem by Robert Hass

"Meditation at Lagunitas" is a poem by American poet and academic Robert Hass. It is his most famous poem, although poet Dan Chiasson has referred to it as "among his weakest." The work deals in part with language, and its inadequacies.

Writing for Poetry, Pimone Triplett referred to the poem as "[...] one of the poems that can save you".
