= Eleanor Wilner =

American poet and editor (born 1937-2021)

Eleanor Rand Wilner (born 1937) is an American poet and editor.

== Life ==
Wilner obtained her bachelor's from Goucher College and her Ph.D. from Johns Hopkins University. Her graduate dissertation concerned the topic of imagination and was later published as Gathering the Winds: Visionary Imagination and Radical Transformation of Self and Society (1975).

She was editor of The American Poetry Review and she is Advisory Editor of Calyx. She has taught at the University of Chicago, Northwestern University, and Smith College. She is on the faculty of the MFA Program for Writers at Warren Wilson College, and lives in Philadelphia.

In 2019, she won the Robert Frost Medal, the Poetry Society of America's award for a "distinguished lifetime service to American poetry."

She has been active in civil rights and peace movements.

== Awards ==
- Robert Frost Medal (2019)
- MacArthur Fellowship (1991)
- National Endowment for the Arts fellowship
- Juniper Prize
- Pushcart Prizes (awarded twice)

== Works ==
- Shekhinah (poems), University of Chicago Press (Chicago, IL), 1984. ISBN 978-0-226-90025-4
- Sarah's Choice (poems). University of Chicago Press. 1989. ISBN 978-0-226-90028-5.
- Otherwise (poems). Chicago, IL: University of Chicago Press. 1993. ISBN 978-0-226-90029-2.
- Reversing the Spell: New and Selected Poems. Port Townsend, WA: Copper Canyon Press. 1998. ISBN 978-1-55659-082-5.
- The Girl with Bees in Her Hair (Copper Canyon Press, 2004) ISBN 978-1-55659-203-4
- Tourist in Hell (University of Chicago Press, 2010) ISBN 978-0-226-90032-2

=== Anthologies ===
- Jorie Graham; David Lehman, eds. (1990). Best American Poetry. Charles Scribner's Sons. ISBN 978-0-684-19187-4.
- Margaret Ferguson; Mary Jo Salter; Jon Stallworthy, eds. (August 1996). The Norton Anthology of Poetry. W. W. Norton & Company. ISBN 978-0-393-96820-0.
- Hilda Raz, ed. (2001). "Facing Into It". Best of Prairie schooner: fiction and poetry. University of Nebraska Press. p. 305. ISBN 978-0-8032-8972-7. "Eleanor Wilner."
- Bill Henderson, ed. (1996). The 1997 Pushcart prize XXI: best of the small presses. Pushcart Press. ISBN 978-0-916366-96-4.
- Bill Henderson, ed. (2003). The Pushcart Prize Xxviii 2004: Best of the Small Presses. Pushcart Press. ISBN 978-1-888889-37-6.
- Melissa Tuckey, ed. (2018). Ghost Fishing: An Eco-Justice Poetry Anthology. University of Georgia Press. ISBN 978-0820353159.

=== Translations ===
- David R. Slavitt; Smith Palmer Bovie, eds. (1998). "Medea". Euripides: Medea. Hecuba. Andromache. The Bacchae. University of Pennsylvania Press. p. 1. ISBN 978-0-8122-1626-4. "Eleanor Wilner."

=== Non-fiction ===
- "Poetry and the Pentagon: Unholy Alliance?", Poetry Foundation, 3.1.06
- Gathering the Winds: Visionary Imagination and Radical Transformation of Self and Society, Johns Hopkins University Press (Baltimore, MD), 1975.

== Awards ==
- Robert Frost Medal (2019)
- MacArthur Fellowship (1991)
- National Endowment for the Arts fellowship
- Juniper Prize
- Pushcart Prizes (awarded twice)
