= Amy Dryansky =

American poet

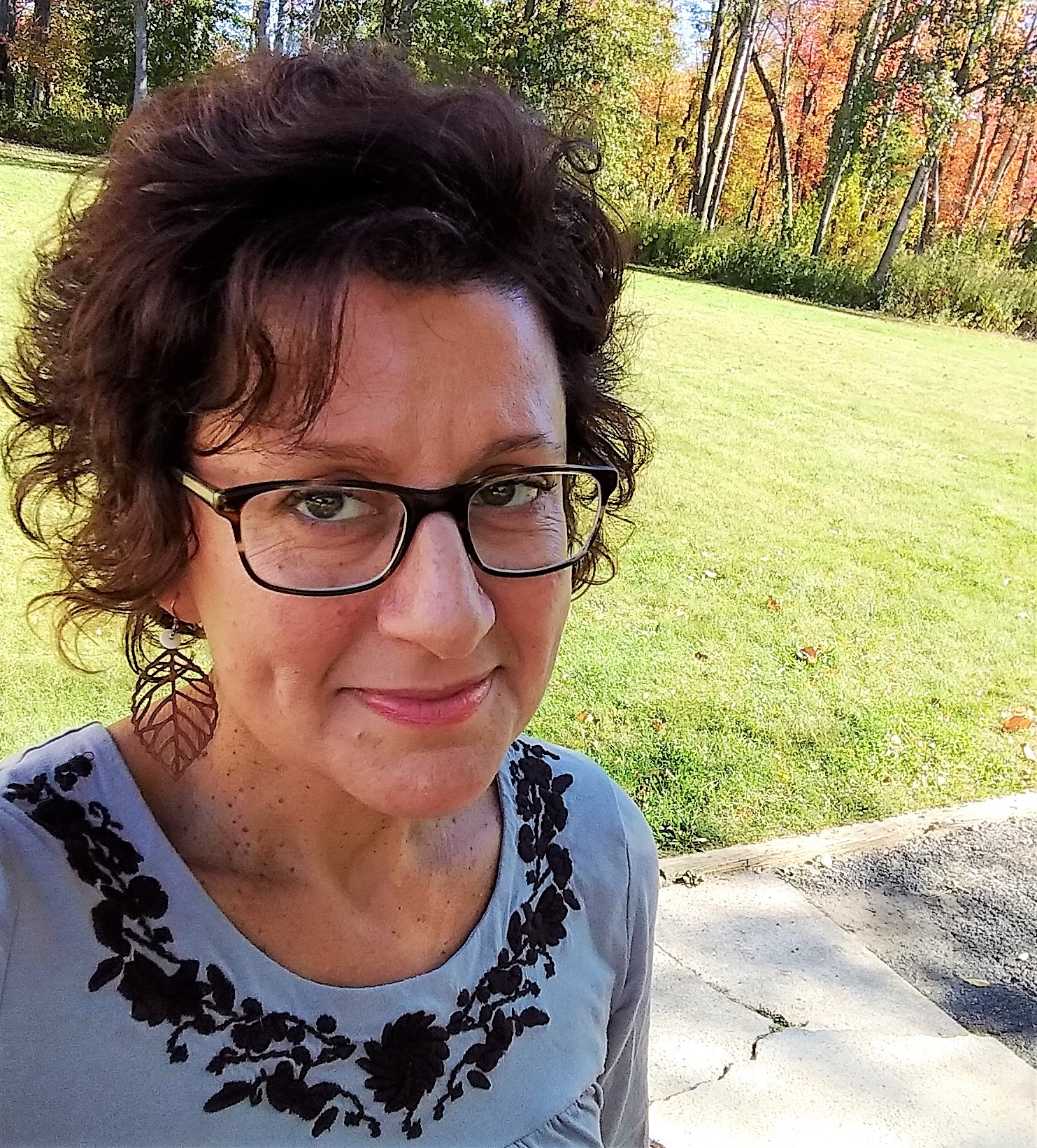
- Education: Syracuse University, Vermont College
- Writing career
- Genre: Poetry
- Website: amydryansky.com

Amy Dryansky is an American poet.

== Life ==
Dryansky grew up in Syracuse, New York, received her B.F.A. from Syracuse University and her M.F.A. from Vermont College. She lives in Conway, Massachusetts with her husband and two children.

== Career ==
She is author of "Grass Whistle" (Salmon Poetry) and How I Got Lost So Close to Home (Alice James Books). She has had her poems published in literary journals and magazines including Orion Magazine, DoubleTake Magazine, The New England Review, The Massachusetts Review, The Sun, Tin House, and in several anthologies: "Lit From Inside: 40 Years of Poetry from Alice James Books," Anne-Marie Macari & Carey Salerno, eds., Alice James Books, 2013; "Myrrh, Mothwing, Smoke: Erotic Poems," Marie Gauthier & Jeffrey Levine, eds., Tupelo Press, 2012; "Morning Song: Poems for New Parents" (Susan Todd & Carol Purington, eds., St. Martin's Press, 2011); "Dogs Singing: A Tribute Anthology" (Jessie Lendennie, ed., Salmon Poetry, 2011); "Sweeping Beauty: Contemporary Women Poets Do Housework" (Pamela Gemin, ed., University of Iowa Press, 2005); "Are You Experienced: Baby Boom Poets at Midlife" (Pamela Gemin, ed., University of Iowa Press, 2003); "Crossing Paths: An Anthology of Poems by Women" (Mad River Press, Barry Sternlieb, ed., 2002).

== Honors and awards ==
Dryansky won the 2022 Cecil Hemley Memorial Award of the Poetry Society of America. She won the Massachusetts Book Award in 2014 for poetry for her book, Grass Whistle. Her honors include two Poetry Fellowships from the Massachusetts Cultural Council as well as the MacDowell Colony, Vermont Studio Center, Villa Montalvo, Bread Loaf Writers Conference, and the Five College Women's Studies Research Center at Mt. Holyoke College. In 1999, she won a Greenwall Fund Grant In 1998, she won a New England/New York Award.

== Works ==
- How I Got Lost So Close to Home, Alice James Books, 1999, ISBN 9781882295227
- Grass Whistle, Salmon Poetry, Cliffs of Moher, ISBN 9781908836410, OCLC 841183871
