= La Mandrágora =

La Mandrágora (Spanish for The Mandrake) was a Chilean Surrealist group "officially founded" on 12 July 1938 by Braulio Arenas (1913–1988), Teófilo Cid and Enrique Gómez Correa. The group had met in Talca and first started exchanging in 1932. They published an eponymous review (of which 7 issues were edited at a small scale, the last issue being edited in October 1943) and an anthology of poetry, El A, G, C de la Mandrágora, which included works by all founders except Teófilo Cid. Politically, the group supported the Popular Front.

Vicente Huidobro (1893–1948), who had formed the Creationist literary movement, had been one of the main intermediaries of Surrealist thought in Chile, through his yearly travels to Paris. The poet Gonzalo Rojas (1917–2011) was also for a short time member of the group, although he harshly disavowed it years later. Rojas had introduced the young Jorge Cáceres to Braulio Arenas in 1938. Others collaborators to the movement included Cáceres, Fernando Onfray, Gustavo Osorio, Huidobro, Pablo de Rokha, the Venezuelan Juan Sánchez Peláez, as well as the painters Eugenio Vidaurrázaga and Mario Urzúa, the musicians Renato Jara, Alejandro Gaete and Mario Medina, and the artist Ludwig Zeller, among others.
