= Andrew Zawacki =

American writer (born 1972)

- Born: May 22, 1972 (age 54)
- Education: College of William and Mary; University of Oxford; University of St Andrews; University of Chicago
- Occupations: Poet; critic; editor; translator

Andrew Zawacki (born May 22, 1972) is an American poet, critic, editor, and translator. He was a 2015 Howard Foundation Fellow in Poetry.

Zawacki's first book, By Reason of Breakings, was chosen for the University of Georgia Press' The Contemporary Poetry Series.

Work from his second book, Anabranch, was awarded the 2002 Cecil Hemley Memorial Award from the Poetry Society of America. The volume also includes his 2001 chapbook Masquerade, selected by Carolyn D. Wright to receive the 2002 Alice Fay Di Castagnola award.

"Georgia", a long poem opening Zawacki's third book, Petals of Zero Petals of One, won the 1913 Prize and was published in 1913: a journal of forms, with short introductions by Peter Gizzi and Cole Swensen.

He has held fellowships from the Collège International des Traducteurs Littéraires, the Résidence internationale aux Récollets, the Bogliasco Foundation, Hawthornden Castle, Le Château de Lavigny, the Salzburg Seminar in American Studies, the Slovenian Writers' Association, the Millay Colony, the Saltonstall Foundation, and the Bread Loaf Writers' Conference.

Zawacki co-edited the international literary magazine Verse with Brian Henry from 1995 through 2019. A Distinguished Research Professor of English, Zawacki has taught at the University of Georgia since 2005.

== Life and work ==
Zawacki was educated at the College of William & Mary and, as a Rhodes Scholar, at the University of Oxford and the University of St Andrews. A former Fulbright Scholar to Australia, he earned his Ph.D. from the Committee on Social Thought at the University of Chicago. Zawacki is a member of Alpha Phi Alpha fraternity.

Along with Andrew Joron, Zawacki is the literary co-executor of poet Gustaf Sobin.

Zawacki's essays and reviews have appeared in national and international journals, among them The Times Literary Supplement, Boston Review, Chicago Review, Australian Book Review, New German Critique, and P. N. Review. He edited Afterwards: Slovenian Writing 1945-1995, as well as editing and translating Aleš Debeljak's new and selected poems, Without Anesthesia (Persea Books, 2011).

He is also the translator, from the French, of poet and psychoanalyst Sébastien Smirou's books See About: Bestiary (La Presse/Fence Books, 2017) and My Lorenzo, published in 2012 by Burning Deck with an introduction by Jennifer Moxley. Zawacki has received translation fellowships from the National Endowment for the Arts, the Centre national du livre, and French Voices, and has also translated Abdellatif Laâbi, Philippe Soupault, and Anne Portugal.

Translated into French by Sika Fakambi, Georgia was published in France in 2009 by Éditions de l'Attente and Carnet Bartleby in 2012. The French edition of Zawacki's first book, Par Raison de brisants, translated by Antoine Cazé, was issued by Éditions Grèges in 2011 and was a finalist for Le Prix Nelly-Sachs. Translated by Anne Portugal, Sonnetssonnants appeared in a bilingual edition in the Collection américaine from Joca Seria.

He is of Polish descent.

== Bibliography ==
=== Full-length poetry volumes ===
- By Reason of Breakings (University of Georgia Press, 2002)
- Anabranch (Wesleyan University Press, 2004)
- Petals of Zero Petals of One (Talisman House, 2009)
- Videotape (Counterpath Press, 2013)
- Unsun : f/11 (Coach House Books, 2019)

=== Chapbooks ===
- Masquerade (Vagabond Press, 2001)
- Bartleby's Waste-book (PS Books, 2009)
- Videotape (Particular Press, 2009)
- Lumièrethèque (Blue Hour Press, 2009)
- Roche limit (tir aux pigeons, 2010)
- Glassscape (Projective Industries, 2010)
- Georgia (Scary Topiary/Katalanché, 2013)
- Arrow's Shadow (Equipage, 2017)
- Sonnensonnets (Tammy, 2019)
- Waterfall Plot (Greying Ghost, 2019)

=== Edited volumes ===
- Afterwards: Slovenian Writing 1945-1995 (White Pine Press, 1999)
- Miracle of Measure Ascendant: A Festschrift for Gustaf Sobin (Talisman House, 2005), co-edited with Andrew Joron
- The Verse Book of Interviews: 27 Poets On Language, Craft & Culture (Verse, 2005), co-edited with Brian Henry
- Collected Poems by Gustaf Sobin (Talisman House, 2010), co-edited with Edward Foster, Andrew Joron, and Esther Sobin
- Without Anesthesia: New and Selected Poems by Aleš Debeljak (Persea Books, 2011)

=== Translated books ===
- Without Anesthesia: New and Selected Poems by Aleš Debeljak (Persea Books, 2011)
- My Lorenzo by Sébastien Smirou (Burning Deck Press, 2012)
- See About: Bestiary by Sébastien Smirou (La Presse / Fence Books, 2017)
