= Philip Lamantia =

American poet (1927–2005)

- Lamantia in 1981
- Born: October 23, 1927; San Francisco, California, U.S.
- Died: March 7, 2005 (aged 77); San Francisco, U.S.
- Occupations: Poet, writer, lecturer
- Spouse: Nancy Peters
- Writing career
- Subjects: Visionary; surrealism
- Notable works: Erotic Poems (1946); Ekstasis (1959)
- Movement: Beat Generation

Philip Lamantia (October 23, 1927 – March 7, 2005) was an American poet, writer and lecturer. His poetry incorporated stylistic experimentation and transgressive themes, and has been regarded as surrealist and visionary, contributing to the literature of the Beat Generation.

== Biography ==
Lamantia was born in San Francisco, California, United States, to Sicilian immigrants and was raised in the city's Excelsior District neighborhood. His poetry was first published in View magazine in 1943, when he was 15 years old, and his poetry appeared in the final issue of the Surrealist magazine VVV the following year. He dropped out of Balboa High School to pursue poetry in New York City, and appeared the same year in American filmmaker Maya Deren's At Land. Aged just 16, Lamantia was hailed by Andre Breton as "a voice that rises once in a hundred years". He returned to the Bay Area in 1945, and his first book, Erotic Poems, was published a year later.

Lamantia was one of the post-World War II poets now sometimes referred to as the San Francisco Renaissance, and later became involved with the San Francisco Beat Generation poets and the Surrealist Movement in the United States. On October 7, 1955, he was on the bill at San Francisco's Six Gallery, where poet Allen Ginsberg read his poem Howl for the first time; at this event, Lamantia chose to read the poems of John Hoffman, a friend who had recently died. Gerd Stern, a poet who had met Lamantia at a reading at the San Francisco Museum of Art in 1947, recalled of his friend: "He admired Dylan Thomas and Wallace Stevens. He had a strange relationship with the surrealists. I could never get him to talk about it. In a way, it was not helping him with his reputation. He was very ambitious. In his last years, he returned to Catholicism and turned reclusive."

Lamantia was also known for his journeys with native peoples in the United States and Mexico, participating in the peyote-eating rituals of the Washo Indians of Nevada, which often inspired his poems. In the 1950s, Lamantia wrote multiple political texts, including a polemical prose text criticizing federal prohibitions of drugs. After he re-embraced Catholicism in the later half of his life, his poetry onward began to explore Catholic themes. American writer Nancy Peters, who was Lamantia's wife and literary editor, commented that "he found in the narcotic night world a kind of modern counterpart to the Gothic castle—a zone of peril to be symbolically or existentially crossed."

== Works ==
- Erotic Poems (Berkeley: Bern Porter, 1946)
- Ekstasis (San Francisco: Auerhahn Press, 1959)
- Narcotica (San Francisco: Auerhahn Press, 1959)
- Destroyed Works (San Francisco: Auerhahn Press, 1962)
- Touch of the Marvelous ([no place] Oyez, 1966)
- Selected Poems 1943–1966 (San Francisco: City Lights Books, 1967)
- Charles Bukowski, Harold Norse, Philip Lamantia: Penguin Modern Poets, No. 13. (Harmondsworth: Penguin, 1969)
- Blood of the Air (San Francisco: Four Seasons Foundation, 1970)
- Touch of the Marvelous -- A New Edition (Bolinas: Four Seasons Foundation, 1974)
- Becoming Visible (San Francisco: City Lights Books, 1981)
- Meadowlark West (San Francisco: City Lights Books, 1986)
- Bed of Sphinxes: New and Selected Poems, 1943–1993 (San Francisco: City Lights Books, 1997)
- Tau; with Journey to the End by John Hoffman. Edited by Garrett Caples (San Francisco: City Lights Books, 2008)
- The Collected Poems of Philip Lamantia. Edited with an introduction by Garrett Caples, Andrew Joron, and Nancy Joyce Peters (Berkeley: University of California Press, 2013)
- Preserving Fire. Selected Prose. Edited with an introduction by Garrett Caples (Seattle/New York: Wave Books, 2018)
- Destroyed Works / Zerstörte Werke (German translation and afterword by Marcus Roloff, bilingual Edition. Wenzendorf: Stadtlichter Presse, 2021)
