= Jane Huffman =

American poet

Jane Huffman (born 1992 Livonia, Michigan) is an American poet. She is currently a PhD candidate in English and Literary Arts at the University of Denver. She has a BA in theatre arts and English from Kalamazoo College and an MFA from the Iowa Writers' Workshop. She founded the online literary magazine Guesthouse, which she ran from 2015 to 2023, and she currently serves on the editorial team of Denver Quarterly.

== Awards and honors ==
- 2023: American Poetry Review/Honickman first book prize
- 2023: The Poetry Society of America Cecil Hemley Memorial Award
- 2019: Ruth Lilly and Dorothy Sargent Rosenberg Poetry Fellowship

=== Residencies ===
- 2018 Willapa Bay Artist-in-Residence

== Published works ==
=== Books ===
- "Public Abstract," American Poetry Review, 2023.

=== Selected Poems ===
- “A few notes on a passage…", Blackbird [forthcoming]
- "Short Essay on Lynn Emanuel," Ploughshares [forthcoming]
- "Rumination" and "October," swamp pink [forthcoming]
- “After Simone Weil,” The New England Review [forthcoming]
- “Tapering,” The Atlantic, May 2024.
- "Six Revisions." Poetry. November 2020.
- "Am I Indulgent" The Nation, December 2022.
- "The Rest." Poetry. December 2019.
- "Revision." Poetry. December 2019.
- "Surety." Poetry. December 2019.
- "Ode." The New Yorker. August, 2018.

=== Selected Criticism ===
- “Rae Armantrout’s Thing Theory,” The Hopkins Review, 2023
