= Jorge Cáceres (poet) =

Chilean poet, painter and dancer (1923–1949)

- Born: Luis Sergio Cáceres Toro; April 18, 1923
- Died: September 21, 1949 (aged 26)
- Occupations: poet, painter and dancer

Jorge Cáceres, real name Luis Sergio Cáceres Toro (April 18, 1923 – September 21, 1949), was a Chilean poet, painter, and dancer. He was also known as the "fourth musketeer" of the elite Chilean Surrealist group La Mandrágora.

He is discussed as a favorite of the Garmendia sisters in the Roberto Bolaño novel Distant Star, in particular his work Bound for the Great Polar Pyramid.

== Works ==
- René or celestial mechanics (1941)
- Free Pass (1941)
- Monument to the Birds (1942)
- Bound for the Great Polar Pyramid (1942)
- The frac incubator (1946)
- Unpublished Texts (1979). Posthumous collection of Ludwig Zeller
- Jorge Caceres, found poetry (2002). Collection of Guillermo Garcia, Pedro Montes, Mario Barrientos and Mauricio Artigas (Pentagram Editors).
