= Enrique Gómez Correa =

Chilean poet, lawyer and diplomat

Enrique Gómez Correa (1915, in Talca – 1995, in Santiago de Chile) was a Chilean poet, lawyer and diplomat.

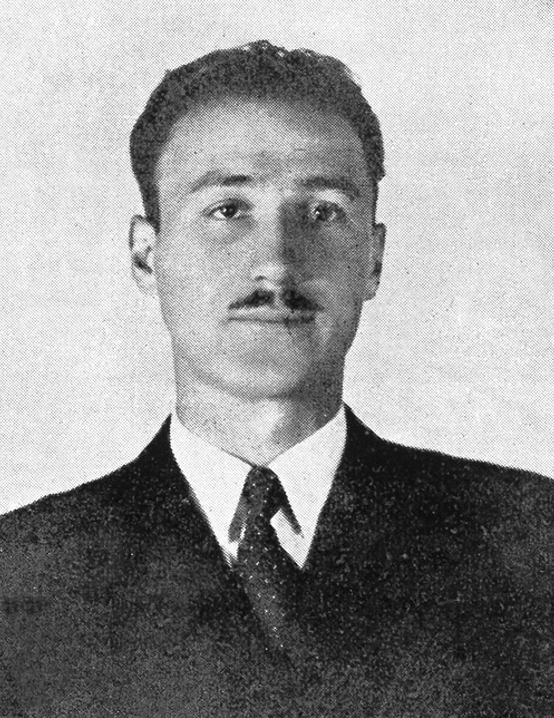
Enrique Gómez Correa

== Biography ==
He studied at the Lyceum for Boys at Abate Molina de Talca, his hometown, where he met Braulio Arenas and Teófilo Cid, with whom he founded the Chilean surrealist Mandrágora group on 18 July 1938, at the University of Chile.

His thesis to obtain his lawyer diploma was entitled Sociology of Madness, published in 1942, which was also influenced by surrealism. It addressed the issue of mental illness and the approach of madness in society, while also articulating the judicial, social and poetic aspects of this condition.

Gomez Correa went to Paris, where he lived from 1949 to 1951 with the main members of French surrealism. He established links with André Breton and especially with the painters Jacques Hérold and René Magritte. In 1948, he wrote The spectrum of René Magritte as a tribute to the Belgian painter.

Gomez Correa was friends with Vicente Huidobro and Pablo de Rokha, who both declared the Chilean who would win the Nobel Prize for Literature.

In addition to poetry, he wrote several essays, a drama inspired by a story by Achim von Arnim (Mandrake King of Gypsies, 1954) and translated Guillaume Apollinaire's Alcools (Ediciones Mandrake, Santiago, 1955).

Gomez Correa, who was a member of the Radical Party, published his books in numbered editions and signed by himself. His diplomatic career began in 1963, when he was stationed in Geneva (1966-1967), Lebanon and Syria (1967-1971), Switzerland and Yugoslavia. The military coup of September 1973 caught him in Guatemala, where he served as Counselor of the Embassy of Chile. The dictatorship of General Augusto Pinochet ended his diplomatic career.

He was married to Wally Bravo and they had four children: Enrique, Veronica, Xavier and Felipe.

A cancer affected his spine. Prostrate, he read esoteric works and watched the leaves that covered the window of his bedroom, reflecting on his condition: "I, who have loved plants, and consider them extremely powerful, I'm now finishing my days as one." He died after 12 years in bed with paralyzed legs, on 27 July 1995, at his old house in Galvarino Gallardo street (in Providencia, Chile), at age 79. His final collection of poetry, Las cosas al perecer perdidas (Things Seemingly Lost), was published after his death in 1996.
