= Braulio Arenas =

Chilean poet and writer (1913–1988)

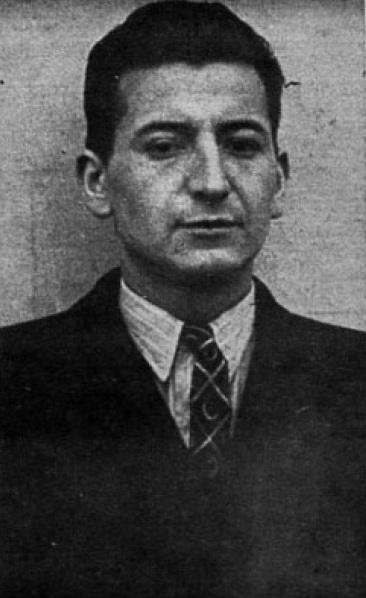
Braulio Arenas

Braulio Arenas (La Serena, April 4, 1913 – †Santiago May 12, 1988) was a Chilean poet and writer, founder of the surrealist Mandrágora group.

== Life ==
Braulio Arenas lived most of his youth in the north of Chile, moving in his teens to Talca to study. There he encountered Teófilo Cid and Enrique Gómez Correa among others, and participated to literary activities with them.

Years later, he started law studies in Santiago, which he soon abandoned to focus on writing. Through Eduardo Anguita, he met Vicente Huidobro, father of "Creationism" literary movement, which disputed literary innovations with Dada and Surrealism. Influenced by these European currents, Arenas founded with some friends, in 1938, the Surrealist group Mandrágora. This circle supported the Popular Front government. The same year, one of his short story, Gehenna, was published in Miguel Serrano's Antología del verdadero cuento en Chile.

Arenas received in 1984 the Chilean National Prize for Literature, winning some recognition albeit confidential editions of his works (often less than 800 exemplaries).

== Works ==
- El mundo y su doble, 1940
- La mujer mnemotécnica, 1941
- Luz adjunta, 1950
- La simple vista, 1950
- En el océano de nadie, narraciones, 1951
- La gran vida, 1952
- El pensamiento transmitido, 1952
- Discurso del gran poder, 1952
- Ancud, Castro y Achao, 1953
- El cerro Caracol, narraciones, 1956
- Versión definitiva, 1956
- El a g c de la Mandrágora, 1957
- Poemas 1934-1959, 1959
- Adiós a la familia, novela, 1961 (reeditada por la Editorial Universitaria en 2000)
- La casa fantasma, 1962
- Vicente Huidobro y el creacionismo, ensayos, 1964
- El juego de ajedrez, o, Visiones del país de las maravillas, 1966
- Pequeña meditación al atardecer en un cementerio junto al mar, 1966
- El castillo de Peth, novela, 1969
- La endemoniada de Santiago, novela, 1969
- En el mejor de los mundos, antología poética 1929-1969; 1970
- Samuel, comedia en dos actos, 1970
- El laberinto de Greta, novela, 1971
- Los mozos de Monleón, narraciones, 1971
- La promesa en blanco, novela, 1972
- Actas surrealistas, ensayo, 1974
- Berenice: la idea fija, novela, 1975
- Los esclavos de sus pasiones, novela, 1975
- El cantar de Rolando, ensayo, 1975
- El pintor Morales Jordán, ensayo, 1975
- Una mansión absolutamente espejo deambula por una mansión absolutamente imagen, 1978
- Los sucesos de Budi, novela, 1980
- La situación física del castillo kafkiano, 1980
- Escritos y escritores chilenos, ensayos, 1982
- Visiones del pais de las maravillas, 1983
- Los dioses del Olimpo, leyendas, 1983
- La promesa en blanco, novela, 1984
- Sólo un día del tiempo. Crónica del año 1929, 1984
- Escritos mundanos, 1985
- Memorándum chileno, 1987
- Realidad desalojada, 2009
- La casa fantasma y otros poemas, 2012
