= Nancy Peters =

American publisher and writer (born 1936)

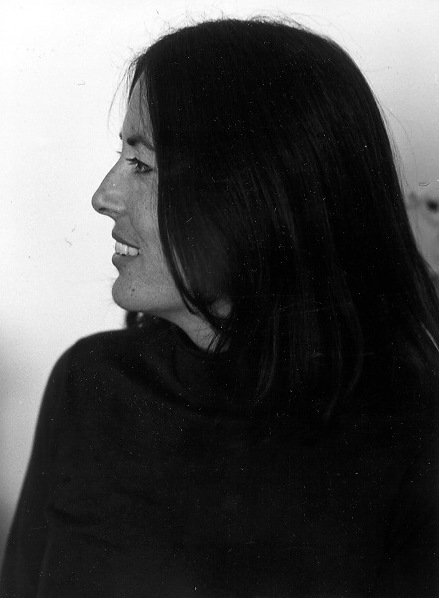
- Born: Nancy Joyce Peters; October 3, 1936 (age 89); Seattle, Washington, U.S.
- Education: University of Washington (BA, MLS)
- Occupations: Publisher, writer, bookstore owner
- Employer: City Lights Books

Nancy Joyce Peters (born October 3, 1936) is an American publisher, writer, and co-owner with Lawrence Ferlinghetti of City Lights Books and Publishers in San Francisco until Ferlinghetti's 2021 death.

== Biography ==
Nancy Peters was born in Seattle, and took a BA in literature and an MLS at the University of Washington. After travel and life abroad between 1961 and 1967, she was briefly employed as a librarian at the Library of Congress. In 1971, she moved to San Francisco and began working as an editor with City Lights. In addition to editorial work Peters was involved in coordinating collaborations with literary and community organizations sponsoring readings, performances, and benefits for progressive social action.

Among the authors Peters worked with are Allen Ginsberg, Charles Bukowski, Harold Norse, Diane di Prima, Julian Beck, Andrei Vozsesnesky, Anne Waldman, Andrei Codrescu, Sam Shepard, Ron Kovic, Ellen Ullman, Michael Parenti, Peter Lamborn Wilson, Rikki Ducornet, and Alejandro Murguia. Peters helped City Lights avoid a financial crisis in the early 1980s, and become a co-owner of the business in 1984. She and Ferlinghetti bought the Columbus Avenue building that houses the bookstore in 1999. City Lights became a registered landmark in 2001, the first time this recognition had been granted to a cultural institution as well as a building.

In the book Literary San Francisco (by Peters & Ferlinghetti), she wrote about the bohemian and radical Bay Area literary scene, from the beginnings through the early 20th century. Co-editor of Unamerican Activities: The Campaign against the Underground Press, Howl on Trial, and Reclaiming San Francisco, she also co-edited Free Spirits: Annals of the Insurgent Imagination and a series of City Lights Reviews. Among other journals, her writing has appeared in Arsenal: Surrealist Subversion, Cultural Correspondence, and The Beats: A Graphic History (Harvey Pekar). She is the translator of Antonio Tabucchi's Dreams of Dreams and The Last Three Days of Fernando Pessoa and was a longtime member of the board of directors of the Istituto Italiano Scuola.

In 2007, after 23 years as City Lights' executive director, Peters stepped down but remains on the board of directors and is president of City Lights Foundation. In 2010, she was given the Northern California Book Association’s Fred Cody Award for Lifetime Achievement.

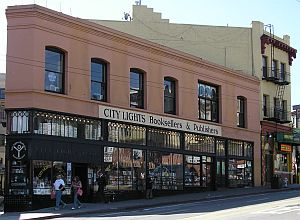
City Lights Books

Ferlinghetti praised her as "one of the best literary editors in the country".

In 1978, she married the Surrealist–Beat Generation poet Philip Lamantia (1927–2005), who lectured at the Art Institute and San Francisco State University. Peters participated with Lamantia in the World Surrealist Exhibition in Chicago in 1976, and they sometimes read together at such events as a benefit for Hopi and Navajo traditional peoples and the Santa Barbara Poetry Festival, and they recorded for the San Francisco Poetry Center Archives. Fourteen of her poems were published in a Black Swan Press chapbook entitled It’s In the Wind. Her poetry was included in Surrealist Women, An International Anthology and in Anthologie des Poètes Surréalistes Américains.
