= Teófilo Cid =

Teófilo Cid (September 27, 1914 – June 15, 1964) was a Chilean poet. He was a member of the Chilean Generación del 38 or Generation of 1938, but was a member of the small Surrealist group in the generation, known as La Mandrágora. Other poets of this elite group were Braulio Arenas and Enrique Gómez Correa. After living an unrestrained life, he died before reaching 50 years of age. He was awarded a number of prizes.

He published a number of books including Bouldroud (1942), El tiempo de la sospecha, lit. Time of the Suspect (1952) which was about critical views of the dictator Carlos Ibáñez del Campo who ran from 1927 until 1931, Camino del Ñielol (1954) which contains a long poem of a thousand verses. He also wrote articles in the seminary Pro-Arte and the La Hora newspaper.

In 1976, Alfonso Calderón made his works in several newspapers and reviews including Pro-Arte and Alerce under the title ¡Hasta Mapocho no más!

== Works ==
- El tiempo de la sospecha. Santiago: Cruz del Sur, 1952.
- Camino del N̄ielol. Santiago: Ediciones Renovación, 1954.
- !Hasta Mapocho no más ...! Santiago: Editorial Nascimento, 1976.
