= Carlos Diaz =

Carlos Diaz may refer to:

== Arts and entertainment ==
- Carlos Díaz Anabalón (1920–1962), better known by his pen-name Carlos de Rokha, Chilean poet
- Carlos Díaz "Caíto" (1945–2004), Argentine singer-songwriter and guitarist
- Carlos Díaz Hernández (born 1981), Puerto Rican drag queen who performs as Cynthia Lee Fontaine
- Carlos Díaz León (born 1972), Chilean actor
- Carlos Diaz (theater director) (born 1957), Cuban theater director
- Carlos Ignacio Díaz Loyola (1894–1968), better known by his pen-name Pablo de Rokha, Chilean poet

== Politics and government ==
- Carlos Díaz Dañino, Peruvian military officer, minister of defence in 2026
- Carlos Díaz Medina (1935–2024), Spanish lawyer and PSOE politician
- Carlos Díaz Olivo, Puerto Rican attorney and politician
- Carlos Díaz (Puerto Rican politician) (born 1970), Puerto Rican politician, member of the Senate and House of Representatives
- Carlos Enrique Díaz de León (1910–1971), provisional President of Guatemala, 1954
- Carlos Gaviria Díaz (born 1937), Colombian lawyer, professor and politician

== Sportspeople ==
- Carlos Díaz (athlete) (born 1993), Chilean middle-distance runner
- Carlos Diaz (catcher) (born 1964), U.S. baseball player (Toronto Blue Jays)
- Carlos Díaz Fernández (born 1983), Spanish competitive horseman
- Carlos Díaz (footballer, born 1945), Chilean footballer
- Carlos Díaz (footballer, born 1974), Argentine footballer
- Carlos Díaz (footballer, born 1979), Uruguayan international footballer
- Carlos Díaz (footballer, born 1982), Colombian football defender
- Carlos Diaz (pitcher) (1958–2015), Hawaiian-born pitcher in Major League Baseball
- Carlos Diaz (soccer, born 1987), American professional football (soccer) player

== Others ==
- Carlos Diaz (Emmerdale), fictional character in British TV soap opera Emmerdale
- Carlos Díaz Vélez, Argentine rancher and philanthropist, namesake of the Fundación Carlos Díaz Vélez
- Carlos Jiménez Díaz (1898–1967), Spanish physician and clinical researcher

== See also ==
- Carlos Dias (disambiguation)
