= Grecia (magazine) =

Literary magazine in Spain (1918–1920)

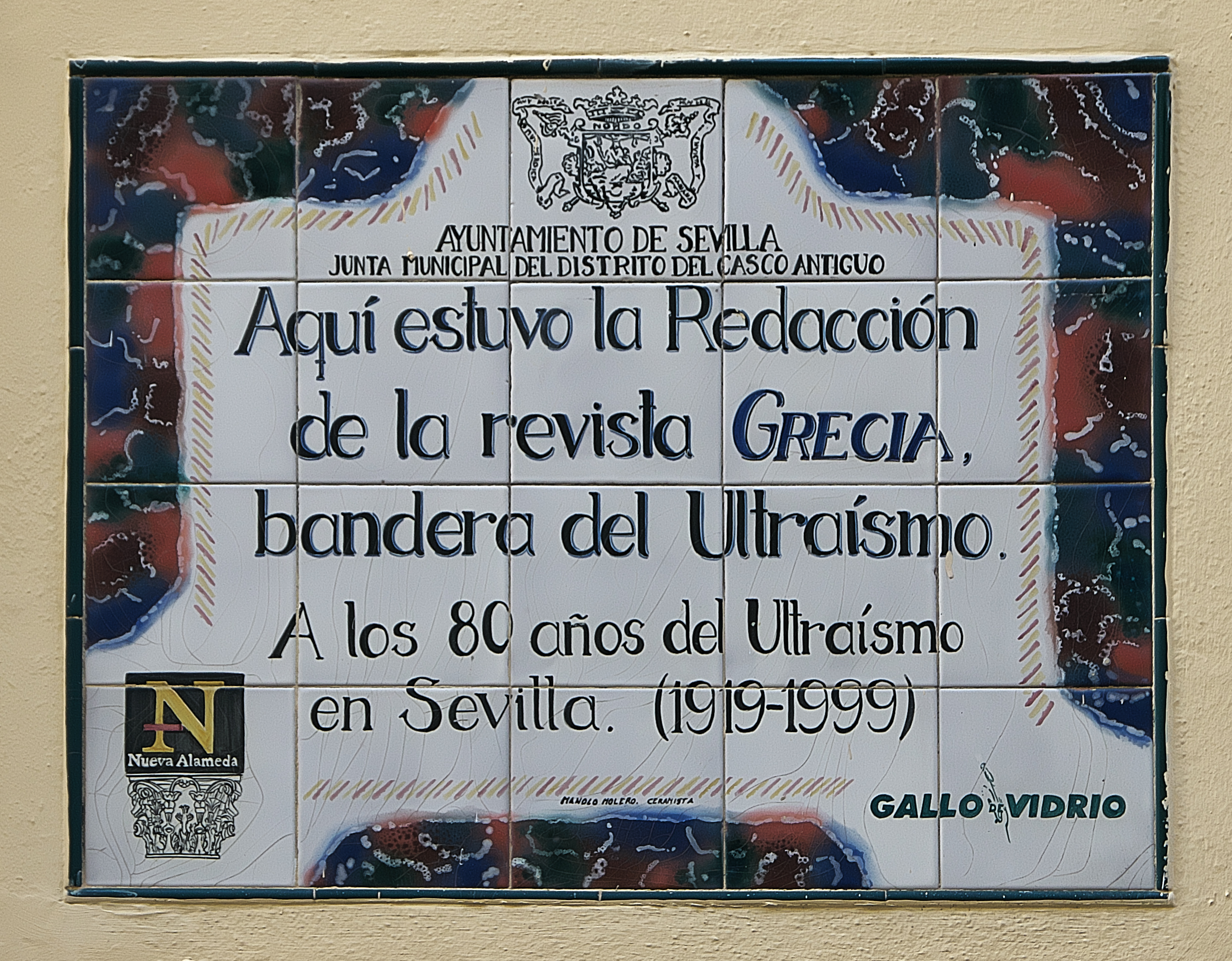
- Commemorative plaque in Seville for the 80th anniversary of the ultraísmo manifesto in Grecia
- Editor: Rafael Cansinos-Asséns
- Former editors: Adriano del Valle
- Categories: Literary magazine
- Founder: Isaac del Vando Villar
- Founded: 1918
- First issue: 18 October 1918
- Final issue: November 1920
- Country: Spain
- Based in: Seville; Madrid
- Language: Spanish

Grecia was a Spanish literary magazine which was published from 1918 to 1920. Its subtitle was Revista Decenal de Literatura (Spanish: Decennial Literature Magazine). Later it was redesigned as Revista de literatura (Spanish: Literature Magazine). It was a traditionalist as reflected in its title and modernist publication in the early years, but later adopted an avant-garde approach and became the flagship of the ultraísmo.

== History and profile ==
Grecia was established by the Andalusian poet Isaac del Vando Villar in Seville in 1918 as a modernist literary magazine. Its first issue appeared on 18 October 1918. Adriano del Valle was the first editor-in-chief of the magazine which had 24 pages throughout its run.

Although Grecia adhered to modernism, over time it covered the work by writers from distinct literary waves such as futurism, cubism, dadaism and expressionism. The first manifesto of the ultraísmo group was published in the magazine in 1919. The group included Guillermo de Torre, Rafael Cansinos-Asséns, Gerardo Diego and Jorge Luis Borges. Following this incident Grecia became the leading media outlet of the avant-garde in Spain. In addition, it played a significant role in the introduction of the ultraísmo in other Spanish-speaking countries, including Mexico. Pedro Garfias published his poem Domingo (Spanish: Sunday) in the magazine which was a typical example of the ultraist poetry.

The headquarters of Grecia moved to Madrid in the summer of 1920. During this period Rafael Cansinos-Asséns edited the magazine. Its title page and header was redesigned by Norah Borges to reflect its avant-garde character. The magazine folded in November 1920.
