= Guillermo de Torre =

Spanish essayist, poet and literary critic

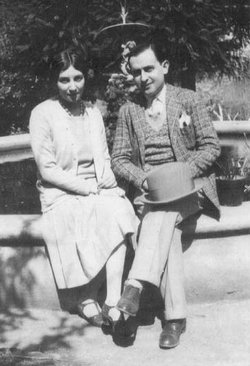

Guillermo de Torre Ballesteros (Madrid, 1900 – Buenos Aires, 14 January 1971) was a Spanish essayist, poet and literary critic, a Dadaist and member of the Generation of '27. He is also notable as the brother-in-law of the Argentine writer Jorge Luis Borges.

== Biography ==
He became a writer at a young age. Ramón Gómez de la Serna, in his book Pombo (1918), described him as "an intelligent and crazy young man". In 1918 he met Vicente Huidobro and Robert and Sonia Delaunay. He subsequently became estranged from Huidobro. He studied law and obtained a diploma, but was unable to become a diplomat due to his deafness. He traveled through Europe and was exposed to various avant-garde artistic movements. In 1919 he wrote the manifesto of Ultraism, and in the same year collaborated with Jorge Luis Borges and Tristan Tzara in writing an automatic poem. He elaborated on Ultraism with a Vertical Manifesto, which appeared in 1920. The same year, with José de Ciria y Escalante, he launched Reflector, which Tzara included in his list of présidents Dada. In 1923 he published a book of Dadaist poems, Helixes, which makes extensive use of calligrams, negative space, free verse, proparoxytones, and the mechanistic frenzy of Futurism. The book's cover was designed by Rafael Barradas, and it was illustrated with woodcuts by Norah Borges. Critics savaged the unorthodox work, which is noteworthy for including some of the first haikus written in Spanish:

La tijera del viento
corta las cabelleras
de las espigas más esbeltas.

In El movimiento V. P., a roman à clef by Rafael Cansinos Asséns that appeared in 1921, De Torre was caricatured as "the youngest poet", speaking in neologisms and proparoxytones. He continued to contribute to numerous Ultraist reviews, including Grecia (1919–1920), Cervantes (1919–1920), Ultra (1921–1922), Tableros (1922), Horizontes, Cosmópolis, and various European magazines such as Manomètre, of which he became an editor in 1925. In 1923, in an article in the September issue of Alfar, he launched a polemic against Creacionismo, the movement founded by his old acquaintance Vicente Huidobro. In it, he accused Huidobro of stealing the aesthetic from Julio Herrera y Reissig, the Uruguayan modernist. (However, the antagonism between De Torre and Huidobro arose in 1921. In Cosmópolis 32, August 1921, Guillermo de Torre wrote about Huidobro: "De ahí que frente a la reiterada obcecación egolátrica del autor de "Poemas árticos", nos vemos obligados a ratificar nuestras aserciones negativas de su ilusa originalidad personal, creyéndose único promotor y cultivador del creacionismo (...)" page 591).

In 1924 De Torre published a translation of Max Jacob's Le cornet à dés. In 1925, he republished some of his writings from Cosmópolis under the title European Vanguard Literature, a work which enjoyed enormous success in Spain and Latin America ("For us," said Alejo Carpentier, "it was a kind of Bible") for its elucidation of such a vast and complex subject. In 1965 an expanded, revised edition, omitting the apologetic tone of the original, was released in three volumes under the title History of Vanguard Literature.

De Torre had a strong interest in the relationship between poetry and visual imagery, and drew upon the theme of cybernetics. His work often reviewed the contributions of major literary figures, both in European Vanguard Literature (Apollinaire, Rimbaud, Blaise Cendras, Reverdy, Pound, Lee Masters, etc.) and in History of Vanguard Literature (T. S. Eliot, D. H. Lawrence, Camus, Sartre, Beauvoir, etc.).

In 1927 he served as secretary in the foundation of La Gaceta Literaria, the review of the Generation of 27 directed by Ernesto Giménez Caballero and illustrated by Gregorio Prieto. He collaborated in Revista de Occidente as well. He married his former collaborator Norah Borges, sister of Jorge Luis Borges, and relocated to Buenos Aires. There he collaborated on the Gaceta Americana. His major theoretical works during these years were Test of conscience: Aesthetic problems of the new Spanish generation (Buenos Aires, 1928) and Itinerary of new Spanish painting (Montevideo, 1931).

Between 1932 and 1936 he and his wife lived in Madrid. He contributed both to newspapers (notably El Sol), and to cultural reviews, among them Revista de Occidente, La Vie des Lettres, and L'Esprit Nouveau. In 1932, he wrote the manifesto of the Society of Iberian Artists (SAI, Sociedad de Artistas Ibéricos). In the same year, along with Pedro Salinas, he founded Índice Literario and collaborated in its review, Arte. At the group's inaugural exhibition in Berlin in 1933, he delivered a conference titled "Panorama of new Spanish painting". In 1934, he and Roberto Payro wrote a monograph on Joaquín Torres-García. With Julio Pérez Ferrero, he compiled the 1935 Literary Almanac. As a member of the Madrid chapter of L'Amics de l'Art Nou (ADLAN), he wrote the prologue of the catalogue of the works of Pablo Picasso organized by that organization. He was one of the most notable peninsular contributors to Eduardo Westerdahl's Canarian review Gaceta de Arte. After the outbreak of the Spanish Civil War, he fled to Paris, where he worked for the republican office of tourism. Later, he settled permanently in Buenos Aires.

De Torre headed the department of literature at the University of Buenos Aires, and held professorships at numerous universities throughout the Americas, while continuing his work in literary and artistic criticism. He was a co-founder and literary adviser of the publishing house Losada, where he oversaw the compilation of the Complete Works of Lorca, and devoted space in his anthologies to Alberti, Bergamín, Cernuda, Faulkner, Kafka, Camus, Moravia, Malraux, and others. He collaborated on many Spanish and Latin American periodicals concerned with criticism, including Buenos Aires's La Nación and Síntesis, of which he was the secretary. Above all, he devoted himself to the study of comparative literature. Like his celebrated brother in law Borges, he grew blind with age. He died in Buenos Aires on 14 January 1971.

A 2005 translation into Italian of his only collection of poems, Eliche, includes some biographical notes, Appunti su mio padre, by his son Miguel de Torre Borges published by Bibliotheca Aretina. As well as appearing in Asséns's El Movimiento V. P., he is satirized by Gerardo Diego in one of his jinojepas, titled Guillaume de Tour, as "prince of the archipenic proparoxytone" (príncipe del esdrújulo archipénico).

Though de Torre's skill as a literary critic is comparable to that of Juan Ramón Jiménez and Luis Cernuda, two other great poets of the 20th century, his intuitions were far from perfect. In his post at Losada, he is remembered for rejecting Gabriel García Márquez's first novel, Leaf Storm, to the author's great discouragement. He also failed to appreciate the poetry of Pablo Neruda, when presented with Neruda's Residencia en la tierra during a voyage to Spain. As an art critic, he is known for his biography the Life and Art of Picasso, the essay Menéndez Pelayo and the Two Spains, and the series The Adventure and the Order. In his Triptych of Sacrifice, he examines three Spanish authors – Lorca, Unamuno, and Machado. Among his theoretical works are the monographs Guillaume Apollinaire: His Life, His Work, the Theories of Cubism, The Problems of Literature, Keys to Hispanoamerican Literature (1959), and The Pointer of the Scale (1961), in which he examines the motivations of socially involved art, which he calls "engaged literature" in the case of poetry, prose, and drama, and "informalism" when describing plastic arts.

His final works were Minorities and Masses in Contemporary Culture and Art (1963), To the Letters (1967), The Metamorphosis of Proteus (1967), New Directions in Literary Criticism (1970), and the compilation Literary Doctrine and Criticism (1970).

== Works ==
=== Poetry ===
- Hélices, Madrid: Mundo Latino, 1923.

=== Criticism ===
- Manifiesto vertical, 1920.
- Literaturas europeas de vanguardia, Madrid: Caro Raggio, 1925.
- Examen de conciencia. Problemas estéticos de la nueva generación española. Buenos Aires: Humanidades, 1928.
- Itinerario de la nueva pintura española, Montevideo, 1931.
- Vida y arte de Picasso (1936)
- El fiel de la balanza, (1941), ensayo.
- Menéndez Pelayo y las dos Españas (1943)
- Guillaume Apollinaire: su vida, su obra y las teorías del cubismo (1946).
- Problemática de la literatura (1951)
- La metamorfosis de Proteo, (1956), ensayos.
- Claves de literatura hispanoamericana (1959)
- La aventura estética de nuestro tiempo (1961)
- Historia de las literaturas de Vanguardia (Madrid, Guadarrama, 1965).
- Ultraísmo, Existencialismo y Objetivismo en Literatura. Madrid: Guadarrama, 1968.
- El espejo y el camino (1968), ensayos.
- Minorías y masas en la cultura y el arte contemporáneo (1963)
- Al pie de las letras (1967)
- La metamorfosis de Proteo (1967)
- Nueva direcciones de la crítica literaria (1970)
- Doctrina y crítica literaria (1970).
- Correspondencia Juan Ramón Jiménez / Guillermo de Torre 1920-1956. Madrid / Fráncfort: Iberoamericana / Vervuert, 2006.
