= Pedro Garfias =

Spanish poet (1901–1967)

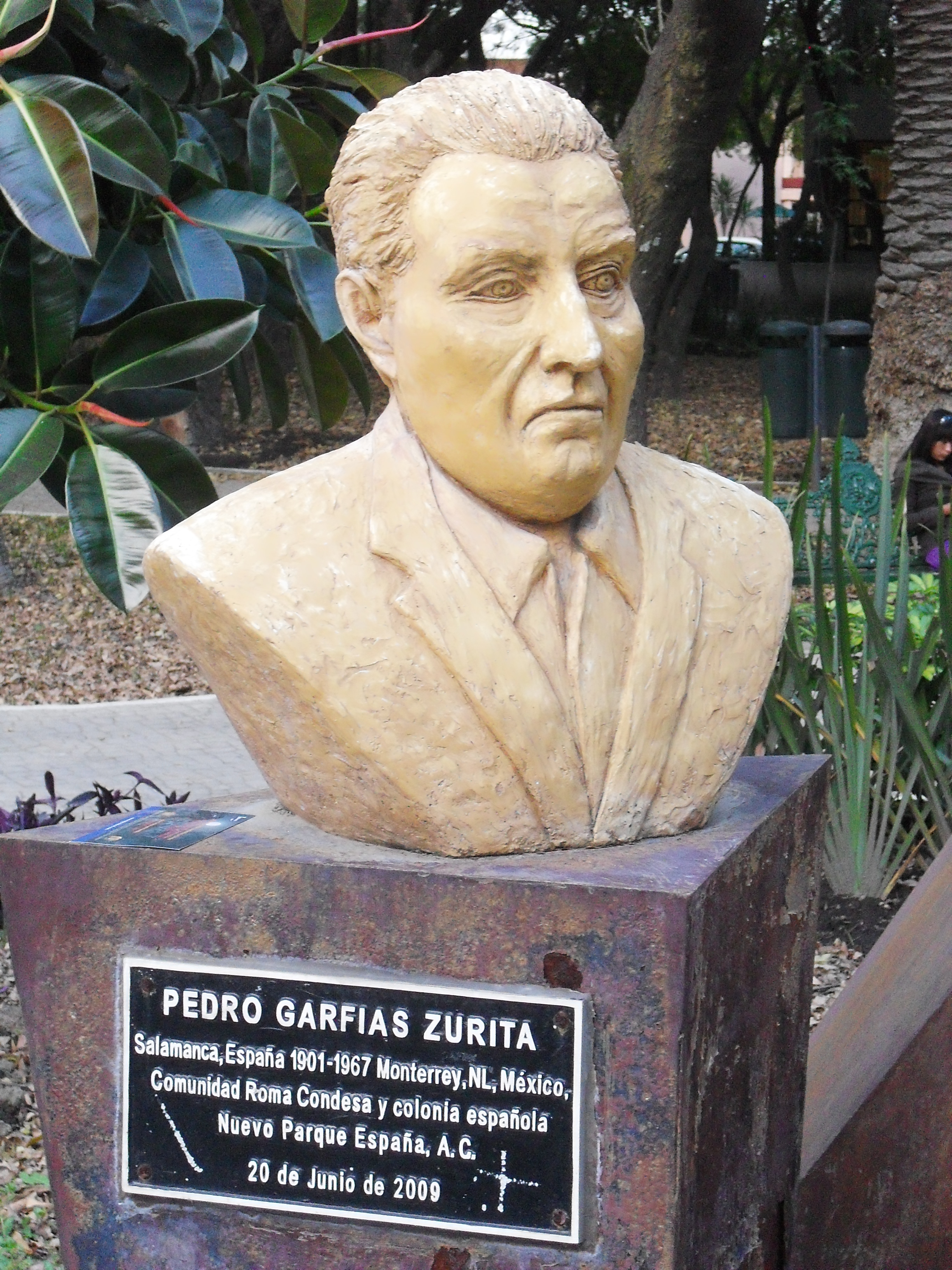
Bust of Pedro Garfias

Pedro Garfias Zurita (May 27, 1901 – August 9, 1967) was a Spanish poet.

Garfias was born in Salamanca, Spain, but spent his childhood and youth in the Andalusian cities of Seville and Córdoba. In 1918 he moved to Madrid in order to study Law at University; however, he did not finish these studies. That year, Pedro Garfias, along with the young poets Guillermo de Torre, César A. Comet and José Rivas Panedas wrote the first Manifiesto Ultraísta (Ultraist Manifesto). It was published in the Seville-based literary magazine Grecia in 1919. In the 1920s, along with other poets, he founded the poetry magazines Horizonte and Tableros.

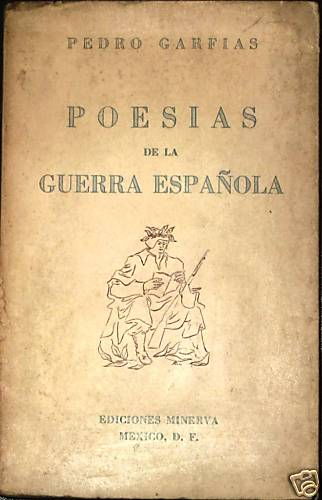

Pedro Garfias was one of the Spanish poets of the Generation of 1927 who was more enthusiastic regarding all the avant-garde movements, as Ultraism. His first book, El Ala del Sur (Southern Wing, though can be translated as Southern Side) was published in Seville in 1926. He joined the Partido Comunista de España (Spanish Communist Party) when the Spanish Second Republic arrived. In 1938, when the Spanish Civil War was already in its second year, he was given the National Award of Literature for Poesías de la Guerra Civil Española. One of his more popular poems is Asturias, that was made into a song by the Spanish singer Víctor Manuel.

Garfias was forced into exile during the Spanish Civil War, along with other artists, writers, and intellectuals.

Garfias died in Mexico in 1967. A bronze monument stands in his honor in Guadalajara, Mexico.

== Published works ==
- El Ala del Sur (roughly: "Southern Wing", 1926)
- Poesías de la Guerra Civil Española ("Poetry of the Spanish Civil War", 1938)
- Primavera en Eaton Hasting ("Spring in Eaton Hasting", 1939)
