= Altazor =

1931 book by Vicente Huidobro

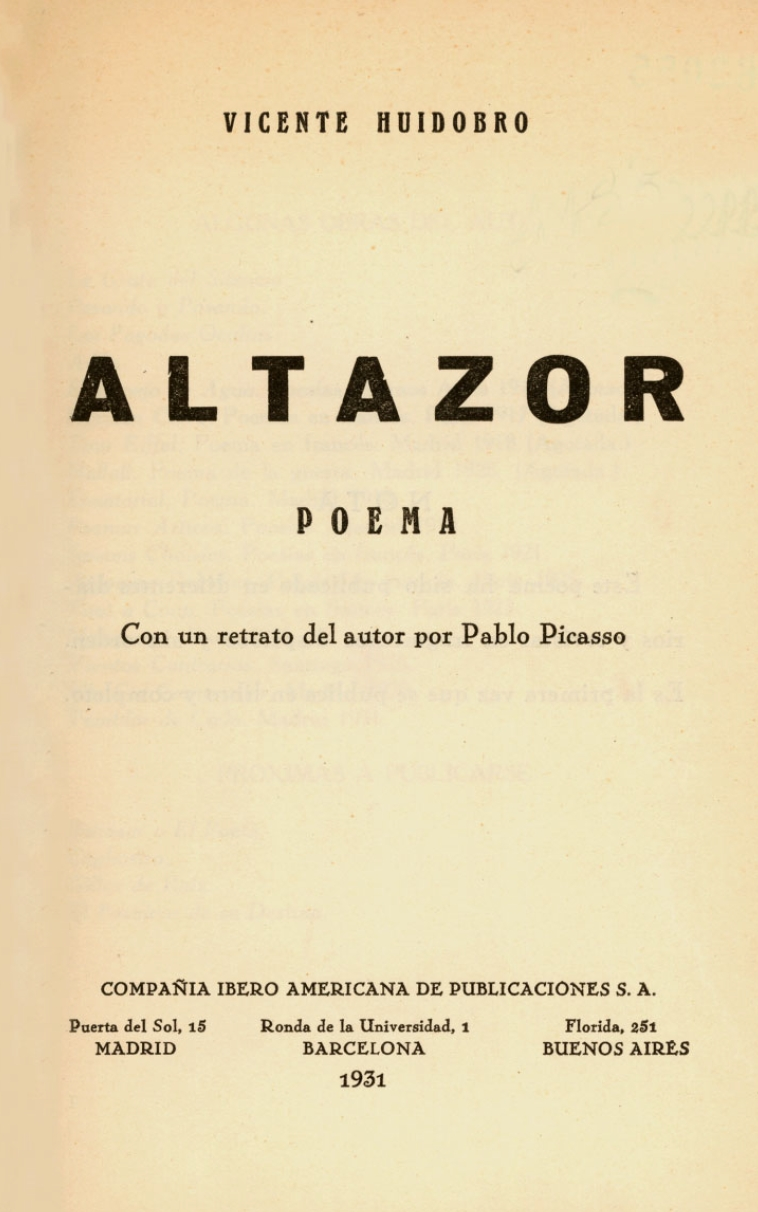
- Altazor or the parachute trip
- Author: Vicente Huidobro
- Original title: Altazor o el viaje en paracaídas
- Illustrator: Pablo Picasso
- Language: Spanish
- Genre: Poetry
- Published: Madrid
- Publisher: Compañía Iberoamericana de Publicaciones
- Publication date: 1931
- Publication place: Chile
- Media type: Print (Paperback)
- Pages: 176

Altazor o el viaje en paracaídas, or simply Altazor, is the magnum opus of Chilean poet Vicente Huidobro, published in Madrid in 1931.

This poem in the shape of a book can be classified as an example of the Avant-garde literature movement developed during the first half of the twentieth century. It can also be thought of as part of the Creacionismo (Creationism literary movement) along with Pablo Neruda's "Residencia en la Tierra", César Vallejo's "Trilce", and Pablo de Rokha's "Los gemidos".

The name "altazor" is a combination of the noun "altura" ("altitude") and the adjective "azorado" ("bewildered" or "taken aback"). "Azorado" has more than one meaning in Spanish and can be interpreted in different ways.

The poem is divided in seven "cantos", ("songs"), preceded by a preface. These cantos were written over an extensive period of time, from 1919 to 1931, and for that reason the topics seem unrelated. The first canto is the longest with almost seven hundred verses, and its content feels metaphysical. In this first canto, the poet introduces himself as "Altazor". The second canto, by contrast, is an ode to women, while in cantos III to VII the author plays with and dismantles the language and its expressive limits.

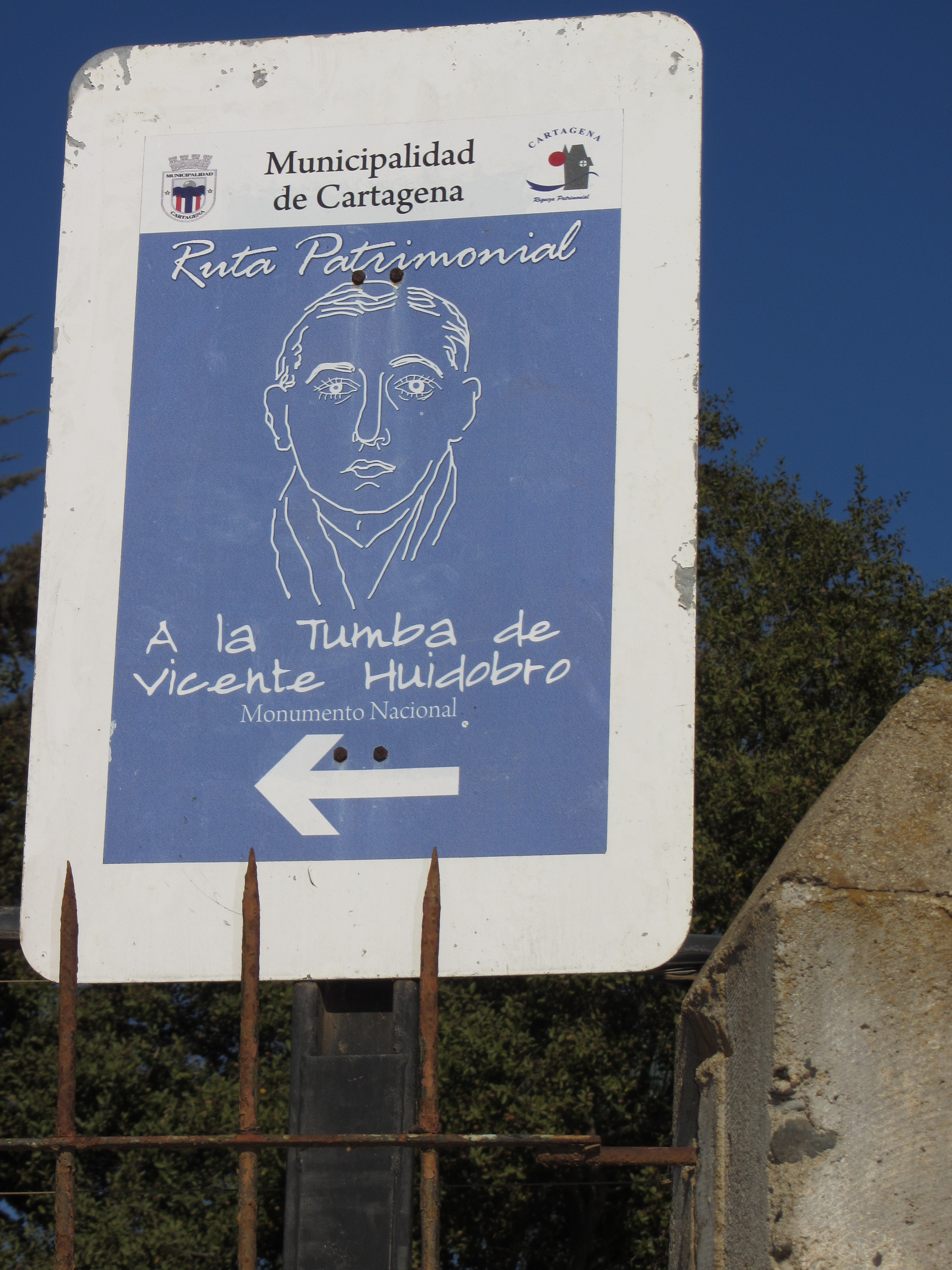
Picasso's portrait of Huidobro on a sign indicating his resting place on the coast of Chile

A fragment of Altazor

The waterfall tresses over the night
While the night beds to rest
With its moon that pillows the sky
I iris the sleepy land
That roads towards the horizon
In the shade of a shipwrecking tree

The book includes a Picasso portrait of Huidobro. In honour of Huidobro's work, the poem has been used to name the Chilean Award of the National Arts, known as the Altazor Award.

== See also ==
- Vicente Huidobro
- Chilean literature
