= The Place Without Limits =

1978 film by Arturo Ripstein

El lugar sin límites
- Theatrical release poster
- Directed by: Arturo Ripstein
- Written by: José Donoso
- Produced by: Francisco del Villar
- Starring: Roberto Cobo; Lucha Villa; Ana Martín
- Cinematography: Miguel Garzón
- Edited by: Francisco Chiu
- Music by: Joaquín Gutiérrez Heras
- Release date: 28 April 1978
- Running time: 110 minutes
- Country: Mexico
- Language: Spanish

The Place Without Limits (Spanish: El lugar sin límites, also released as Hell Without Limits) is a 1978 Mexican drama film directed by Arturo Ripstein, produced in Mexico and based on the 1966 novel of the same name written by Chilean José Donoso.

The film was selected by Mexico as its entry for the Best Foreign Language Film at the 51st Academy Awards, but was not accepted as a nominee. In July 2018, it was selected to be screened in the Venice Classics section at the 75th Venice International Film Festival.

== Plot ==
The film opens on a man driving a truck. He stops in front of a house and begins honking the horn. Inside, Manuela (Roberto Cobo) and her daughter, known as Japonesita (Ana Martín), are asleep. Manuela panics, recognizing the honk as that of Pancho (Gonzalo Vega), a man who has attacked her before, destroying her red flamenco dress. Manuela wakes the other women in the brothel in search of red thread to mend the dress. She is sent instead to Ludovinia, an elderly, deaf woman who gives her the thread. Ludovinia reveals that Don Alejo (Fernando Soler), the town's mayor, had once taken a liking to Pancho, hiring him to drag his daughter, Moniquita, in wagon and encouraging him to go to school. As Manuela leaves, she bumps into Don Alejo, who offers to buy the brothel.

Meanwhile, Pancho is at the gas station of his brother in law, Octavio. Octavio is closing the gas station because the town has been reduced to practically nothing. They complain about Don Alejo, who has been systematically buying all of the property. Don Alejo had also lent Pancho the money for his truck, and came to collect a payment.

Japonesita, looking for Don Alejo, walks in after their interaction and finds Pancho crying. He attacks her for seeing him in this state, but relents. He tells her that Don Alejo is a bad man, but she refuses to believe it, insisting that Don Alejo had promised to restore the electricity to the brothel. Pancho tells her that Don Alejo was the one who had cut it in the first place.

After Manuela and Japonesita fight over the possible sale of the brothel, Japonesita declares that she wants to decorate it the way her mother, La Japonesa, would have. This angers Manuela, and Japonesita locks herself in their room, opening a case of La Japonesa's things.

A flashback begins that depicts how Manuela and La Japonesa met. Manuela arrived with a troupe of dancers and singers for Don Alejo's inauguration. In the scene it is clear that Don Alejo has already begun backing out on promises he had made to the community. Manuela begins to dance to raucous boos, but Don Alejo insists on letting her finish. She is swept up by several men and the party leaves for the river. Manuela is pushed in the river and stripped. When they declare, "She's a man!" Manuela says dismissively, "It's only good for peeing." La Japonesa is inspired. She places a bet with Don Alejo that she can get Manuela aroused and "make her a man." Don Alejo, disbelieving, offers her ownership of the brothel if he can watch them have sex. La Japonesa enters Manuela's room and begins kissing her, and it cuts to Don Alejo leaving the doorway, apparently satisfied with the bargain. After, Manuela declares her love for La Japonesa but is rebuffed. "If you fall in love with me you'll become a man, brutish and rude."

In present day, Octavio lends the money for Pancho to pay off Don Alejo, and they celebrate his freedom by going to the brothel. Manuela hides, watching through the window as Pancho and Japonesita dance. Pancho insists that Japonesita "owes him" for the tears she saw. He starts to hurt her, roughing her up and demanding Manuela. Japonesita insists that Manuela has gone as Pancho gets increasingly violent. Manuela eventually bursts in in her red flamenco gown, dancing seductively for Pancho. They eventually begin kissing until Octavio sees them and breaks them up. Pancho turns on Manuela, insisting that she did it to try and make him gay.

Manuela runs away screaming, chased by Pancho and Octavio in the truck. Don Alejo and Renaldo, his servant, see them and follow all the way to the quarry where Manuela is cornered. Renaldo repeatedly asks Don Alejo if he should shoot Pancho and Octavio but Don Alejo says no, even as Pancho beats Manuela. He finally kills her with a kick to the head, and Pancho and Octavio drive away. Don Alejo promises to see them behind bars. "They will learn what it really means to be macho." Manuela's bloody head is shown.

At the brothel, another woman expresses her concern to Japonesita. Japonesita says not to worry, that Manuela will return, beat up "as usual". The last image is of Japonesita turning out her oil lamp.

== Cast ==
- Roberto Cobo ... Manuela
- Lucha Villa ... La Japonesa
- Ana Martín ... Japonesita
- Gonzalo Vega ... Pancho
- Julián Pastor ... Octavio
- Carmen Salinas ... Lucy
- Fernando Soler ... Don Alejo
- Emma Roldán ... Ludovinia
- Hortensia Santoveña ... Clotilde
- Blanca Torres ... Blanca
- Marta Aura ... Emma, hermana de Pancho
- Tere Olmedo ... Lila
- Paco Sañudo
- Socorro de la Campa
- Agustín Silva
- Francisco Llopis (as Paco Llopis)
- Nery Ruiz
- Cecilia Leger
- María Barber
- Ana Iris
- Ramón Neves
- César Sobrevals
- Rubén Monterrubio
- María Clara Zurita
- José Antonio Estrada

== Reception ==
Author Sergio de la Mora opined that "Manuela, the aging and somewhat grotesque transvestite stands out as the most memorable character; Manuela embodies the abject and quintessentially flamboyant effeminacy intimately linked to how male homosexuality has historically been perceived and represented in Mexican society and culture; Manuela is both heroic and pathetic; she is admirable for her tenacity in conquering Pancho, a virile married man, whose conflicting homoerotic fears and desires make him dangerous."

Phillip Bergson wrote in Continental Film Review, "socially significant for a country obsessed with virility it is so badly designed and directed that it ruins its potential; for all its visual impact it might have been photographed through linoleum and the clumsy climax provoked hoots of hilarity."

== See also ==
- List of submissions to the 51st Academy Awards for Best Foreign Language Film
- List of Mexican submissions for the Academy Award for Best Foreign Language Film
