= Four Greats =

Four Greats may refer to:

- The Four Greats (Norwegian writers), four of the most influential Norwegian writers of the late 19th century
- Four greats of Chilean poetry, four of the most important poets of Chilean literature
- The four greats of the trova, four of the most influential early singer/songwriters from Cuba
