= Carlos Franz =

Chilean writer

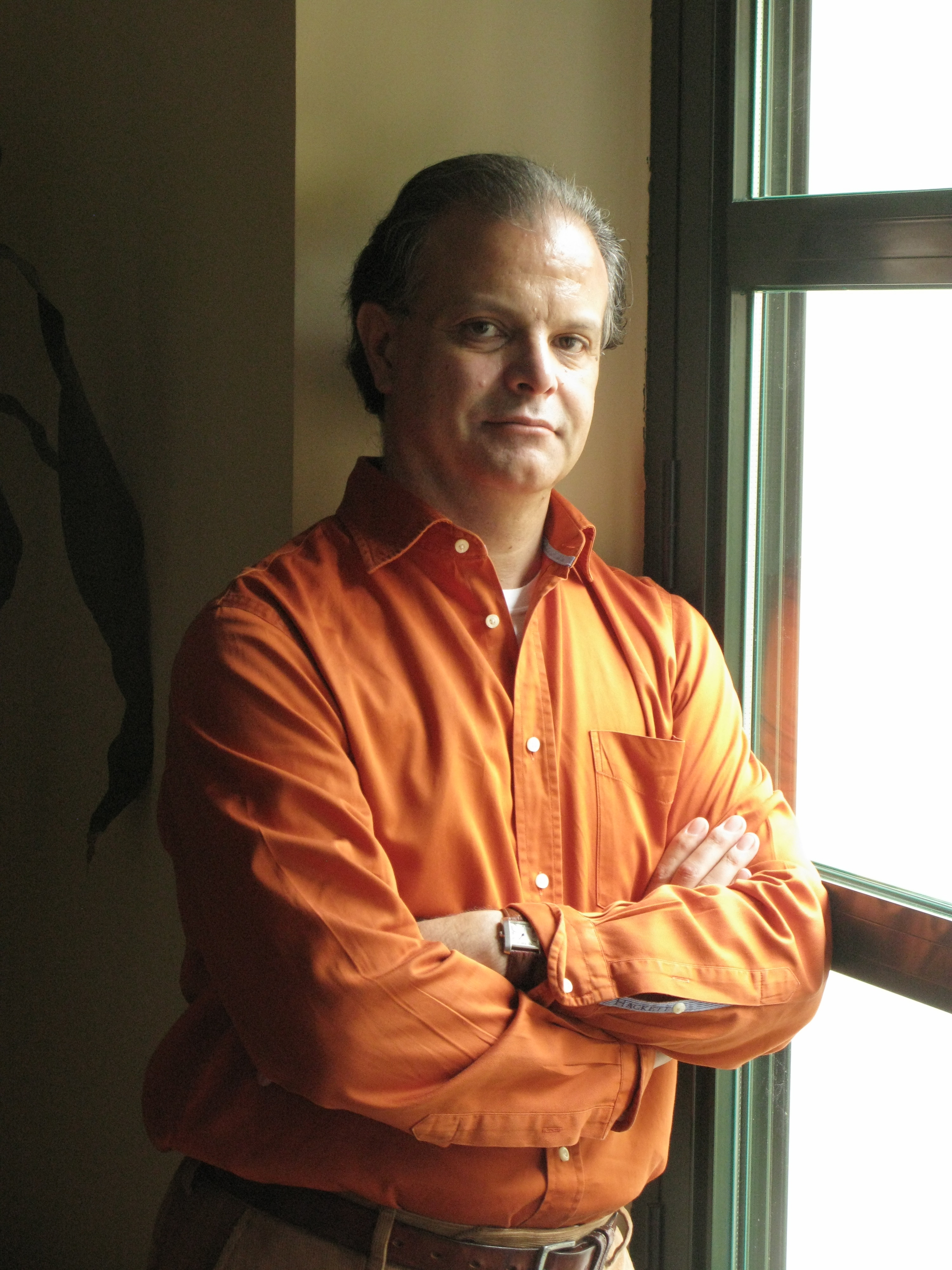
- Born: Carlos Franz Thorud; March 3, 1959; Geneva, Switzerland
- Occupation: Writer
- Writing career
- Genres: Novel, short story, essay
- Notable works: Santiago cero, El lugar donde estuvo el Paraíso, El desierto

Carlos Franz Thorud (born March 3, 1959) is a writer from Chile, who also holds Spanish citizenship.

== Biography ==
The son of the Chilean diplomat of German descent Carlos Franz Núñez and the stage actress of Norwegian descent Miriam Thorud Oliva, Carlos Franz was born in Geneva, Switzerland, where his father was posted. At age 11, after having also lived in Argentina, he arrived to Chile.

Franz studied law at the Universidad de Chile (1976-1981) and became a member of the Chilean Bar in 1983, a career that he abandoned four years later so as to dedicate himself to literature. Between 1981 and 1983 he attended the literary workshop of José Donoso.

Franz has written the novels Santiago Cero (1988); El lugar donde estuvo el Paraíso (1996); El desierto (2005); Almuerzo de vampiros (2007); and Si te vieras con mis ojos (2015).

Some of his works have been translated into other languages (English, German, French, Italian, Dutch, Portuguese, Finnish, Polish, Romanian, and Chinese), and El lugar donde estuvo el Paraíso was made into a movie by the Spaniard Gerardo Herrero with the Argentine actor Federico Luppi in the leading role.

In addition to novels, Franz has written short stories (his collection La prisionera 2005).

Franz's work has been praised critically by prestigious authors. Mario Vargas Llosa wrote "in El desierto, Carlos Franz tells a fascinating story that is, at the same time, a dive into the depths of cruelty and human compassion, and into the violence of history. Written and constructed with a master's hand, this is one of the most original novels produced in modern Latin American literature.

Carlos Fuentes referred to Franz as "a new voice, powerful, creative and committed to the word" and regarding Almuerzo de vampiros he wrote that it "gives birth to absolutely unique, independent, and creative forms of narration".

== Honors and awards ==
- Premio Latinoamericano de Novela CICLA 1988 forSantiago Cero
- Finalist Premio Planeta Argentina 1996 for El lugar donde estuvo el paraíso
- Finalist Premio Altazor 2002 forLa muralla enterrada
- Premio Municipal de Santiago 2002 for La muralla enterrada
- Premio del Consejo Nacional del Libro de Chile 2005, for La prisionera
- Finalist Premio Altazor 2006 for El desierto
- Premio Internacional de Novela La Nación-Sudamericana for El desierto
- Artist in Residence in Berlín DAAD 2000-2001
- Visiting Fellow, University of Cambridge, 2001
- Cátedra Julio Cortázar, Universidad de Guadalajara, 2010
- Resident Fellow, Bellagio Center, Rockefeller Foundation, 2012

== Works ==
- Santiago cero, novel, 1988
- El lugar donde estuvo el Paraíso, novel, 1996
- La muralla enterrada. Santiago, ciudad imaginaria, essay, 2001
- El desierto, novel, 2005
- Almuerzo de vampiros, Madrid, 2007
- La prisionera, stories, Santiago, 2008
- Alejandra Magna, illustrated and bi-lingual English Spanish edition (translation by Jonathan Blitzer), Ediciones del Centro, Madrid, 2011
- The Absent Sea, Translated from El desierto by Leland H. Chambers, 2011, ISBN 9780929701943,

== Links ==
- Franz in the Biblioteca Virtual Cervantes
- Cuento de Franz La prisionera, reproduced in the magazinea Lecturas Nº3
- Carlos Franz in Letras Libres
- Artículos de Carlos Franz in El País
- Dr. Alfonso de Toro on El desierto
- Review of the story La prisionera
- Franze in Lecturalia
