= Carlos de Rokha =

Chilean poet and writer

- Born: 17 October 1920; Valparaíso, Chile
- Died: 29 September 1962 (aged 41); Santiago, Chile
- Relatives: Pablo de Rokha (father); Winétt de Rokha (mother)

Carlos de Rokha, born Carlos Díaz Anabalón, (Note: In this Chilean name, the first or paternal surname is Díaz and the second or maternal family name is Anabalón.) (17 October 1920 – 29 September 1962) was a Chilean poet and writer.

He died in Santiago in September 1962, either by suicide or from an overdose of prescription medicine.

== Works ==
The work of de Rokha is collected in four publications:

- Prophetic Song to the First World, 1944.
- The Visible Order, 1956.
- Memorial and Keys, 1964.
- Pavana Rooster and the Harlequin, 1967 (second edition, 2002).

Enrique Lihn refers to the low coverage of de Rokha's work thus:

"The poetry of Carlos de Rokha is one that would leave historiara gainful if, indeed, the whole of our literature. With its own characteristics, and distinct from other works, de Rokha recorded all-expressive formal concerns that have contributed to the development of a small but brilliant literary tradition."
