= Ultraist movement =

Literary movement

The Ultraist movement (Spanish: ultraísmo) was a literary movement born in Spain in 1918, with the declared intention of opposing Modernismo, which had dominated Spanish poetry since the end of the 19th century.

The movement was launched in the tertulias of Madrid's Café Colonial, presided by Rafael Cansinos Assens. The Ultraist core was formed, among others, by Guillermo de Torre, Juan Larrea, Gerardo Diego and the Argentine Jorge Luis Borges, who lived in Madrid at the time. The first manifesto of the group was published in the Seville-based literary magazine Grecia in 1919.

In the trend of Russian and Italian futurism, Dadaism and French surrealism, the Ultraist movement, which ended in 1922 with the cessation of the journal Ultra (though some authors, such as Borges, continued writing in the Ultraist style for nearly a decade afterwards), proposed an aesthetic change, less ambitious than that of surrealism, trying to extend to all arts and to daily life itself. The Ultraists departed completely from the mannerisms and opulence of Modernismo. Ultraist poetry is characterized by evocative imagery, references to the modern world and new technologies, elimination of rhyme, and creative graphic treatment of the layout of poetry in print, in an attempt to fuse the plastic arts and poetry. Ultraism was influenced in part by Symbolism and by the Parnassians.

In a manifesto published by Nosotros magazine (Buenos Aires, 1922), Borges summarized Ultraist goals thus:

1. Reduction of the lyric element to its primordial element, metaphor
2. Deletion of useless middle sentences, linking particles and adjectives.
3. Avoidance of ornamental artifacts, confessionalism, circumstantiation, preaching and farfetched nebulosity.
4. Synthesis of two or more images into one, thus widening its suggestiveness.

The expression "ornamental artifacts" was clearly a reference to Rubén Darío's Modernismo, which the Ultraists considered over-ornamented and lacking in substance. The Ultraist movement agreed with other avant-garde movements in its elimination of sentimentalism.

Ultraism was akin to the creacionismo of the Chilean poet Vicente Huidobro, who met with the Ultraists in their tertulias. Huidobro proposed that a poem should always be a new object, distinct from the rest, which must be created "like nature creates a tree"—a position that implied freedom of the poem from reality, including the inner reality of the author.
