= The Obscene Bird of Night =

1970 novel by José Donoso

- First US edition
- Author: José Donoso
- Original title: El obsceno pájaro de la noche
- Translators: Hardie St. Martin and Leonard Mades
- Language: Spanish
- Genre: Magical Realism, Horror
- Publisher: David R. Godine Publisher
- Publication date: January 1, 1970
- Publication place: United States
- English publication date: 1973
- Media type: Print
- Pages: 328
- Award: PEN Translation Prize for Hardie St. Martin & Leonard Mades (1974)
- ISBN: 9781567920468 2003 paperback

The Obscene Bird of Night (Spanish: El obsceno pájaro de la noche) is a novel by Chilean writer José Donoso, first published in 1970. It is widely regarded as his most important and acclaimed work. Donoso was a prominent member of the Latin American literary boom and is frequently associated with the literary movement known as magical realism. The novel is noted for its complex narrative structure, themes of identity and alienation, and its use of myth and symbolism, particularly the figure of the Imbunche from the folklore of Chiloé Island.

== Themes ==
The novel explores the cyclical nature of life and death and the connection between childhood and old age through shared fears and fantasies and a mutual lack of bodily control. Donoso invokes the Imbunche myth to symbolize the process of reduction of the physical and intellectual self, turning the living being into a thing or object incapable of interacting with the outside world, and depriving it of its individuality and even of its name. This can either be self-inflicted or forced upon by others.

The myth comes from the oral tradition of Chiloé Island, an island of the southern coast of Chile. In its physical manifestation, it is a grotesquely disfigured being that has been sutured, tied, bound and wrapped from birth. In this way, its orifices are sewn shut, its tongue is removed or split, its extremities and sexual organ bound and immobilised. It is then kept as a guardian to a cave. It is the product of magic and witchcraft. It is the incarnation of the very realistic fears we feel as children, when monsters, magic and imaginings all seem real – they are the deeply rooted fears that, despite rationalisation, remain present (albeit dormant) in the recesses of the subconscious.

In the novel, the intellectual/spatial manifestation of the Imbunche is the self-imposed alienation from the outside world, i.e. an adoption of the ideal of the physical Imbunche in terms of space, with the purpose of taking away the power that others have over the individual and choosing a life of non-existence. This auto-segregation is achieved by fortifying one’s living space, i.e. sealing off all the entrances (like the Imbunche’s, metaphorically speaking). This seclusion from the outside world is a form of self-preservation from an oppressive and anti-individualistic society. Later on in the novel, a reversal from the state of Imbunche begins, with the recuperation of one’s own name – the word that represents the concept of an individual. Ironically, the re-discovery of the self here depends on being acknowledged by the outside world, to be named by others.

In The Obscene Bird of Night, the narrator and protagonist, Humberto Peñaloza, goes through the different stages of the deconstruction of his personality. He not only becomes El Mudito (The Mute or The Mutey), he eventually transforms into the monstrous Imbunche. This mutation also affects the characters in other ways, as in the case of Doctor Azula and the endless pregnancy of Iris the Orphan, and the regeneration process of Humberto himself. Even the identity of the characters becomes ambiguous or distorted sometimes, as for instance when Humberto says that Iris was developing a substantial clientele in the neighbourhood and then proceeds to say that he would hide inside the Ford car to watch her make love... to himself, as if it were an out-of-body experience.

In this way, Humberto provides the possibility of duplicity of narrative voices within the same character, and thus two subjective perspectives of the same reality: on the one hand, the narrative can be interpreted simply and realistically in terms of its context, in which Humberto Peñaloza, a middle-class law student and writer, is trying to make his way through the ranks of the contemporary Chilean society, which was strictly divided according to class; on the other hand, the narrative can be interpreted in terms of its ambiguous and amorphous nature, in which identity itself is not defined, history is the result of myth and the boundaries between the material and psychological world are broken and in flux, therefore opposing the solidity and immutability of the physical world and established society, where individuals are forced to lose part of their identity and freedom in order to acquire a role in society and thus not be otherwise marginalised.

Ultimately the novel postulates and explores an existential paradox: the struggle between being vs. non-being, internal vs. external, interaction vs. separation, and society vs. individuality.

== Publication history ==
The novel was translated into English by Hardie St. Martin and Leonard Mades and published by Alfred A. Knopf in 1973, with about twenty pages cut. This edition was reprinted by David R. Godine, Publisher in 1979. Megan McDowell revised the translation, adding the previously untranslated text, and the new edition was published by New Directions in 2024.

== See also ==
- The Metamorphosis
