= Hell Has No Limits =

1966 novel by José Donoso

- First edition (Spanish)
- Author: José Donoso
- Original title: El lugar sin límites
- Translator: Suzanne Jill Levine
- Language: Spanish
- Publisher: Sun & Moon Press
- Publication date: 1966
- Publication place: Chile
- English publication date: 1972
- Media type: Print (paperback)
- Pages: 142
- ISBN: 1-55713-275-5

Hell Has No Limits (Spanish: El lugar sin límites, "The Place Without Limits") is a 1966 novel written by Chilean José Donoso. The novel is set south of the Chilean capital, Santiago, in a small town near the regional center of Talca. It tells the story of a bordello, and details the prostitutes' way of life. The main character is Manuela, the travesti who owns the bordello. A number of other memorable characters are introduced. The novel was well received, and Donoso himself considered it his best work: "the most perfect, with fewest errors, the most complete".

== Title ==
The title Hell Has No Limits refers to a line in Marlowe's play Doctor Faustus, where the character Mephistophilis says:

Hell hath no limits, nor is circumscrib'd
In one self place; for where we are is hell,
And where hell is, there must we ever be.

—Doctor Faustus, Act II, scene i, line 118

== Film adaptation ==
In 1978, the book was made into a film of the same name.

== Editions available ==
- Carlos Fuentes / José Donoso / Severo Sarduy (1972). Triple Cross: Holy Place / Hell Has No Limits / From Cuba with a Song, Dutton.
- Donoso, José (1995), Hell Has No Limits, Los Angeles: Sun & Moon Press, OCLC 33207281. Trans. Suzanne Jill Devine.
- Donoso, José (1999), Hell Has No Limits, Los Angeles: Green Integer, OCLC 42949208. Trans. Suzanne Jill Devine.
