= Carlos Dias =

Carlos Dias may refer to:

- Carlos Dias (fencer) (1910–1995), Portuguese épée fencer
- Carlos Alberto Dias (born 1967), Brazilian football striker
- Cafú (footballer, born 1993), Carlos Miguel Ribeiro Dias, Brazilian football midfielder
- Carlos Dias (footballer) (born 2000), Brazilian football midfielder

== See also ==
- Carlos Diaz (disambiguation)
