= Juan Larrea (poet) =

Spanish writer and poet (1895–1980)

Juan Larrea Celayeta
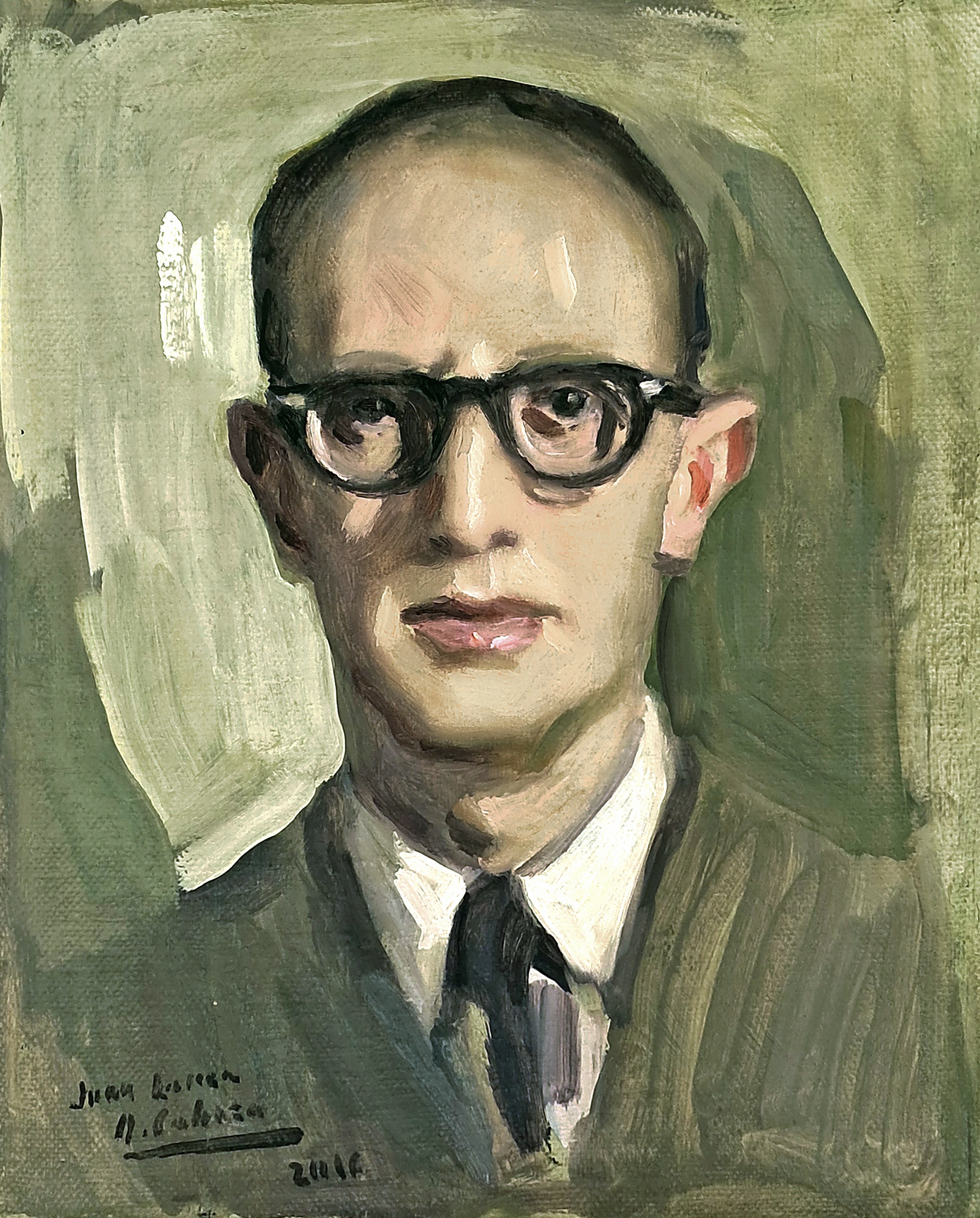
- Oil portrait of Juan Larrea Celayeta.
- Born: 13 March 1895; Bilbao, Spain
- Died: 9 July 1980 (aged 85); Córdoba, Argentina
- Education: University of Salamanca
- Occupations: Poet, essayist
- Known for: Surrealist poetry, studies on César Vallejo and Machu Picchu
- Movement: Surrealism, Ultraism

Juan Larrea Celayeta (13 March 1895 – 9 July 1980) was a Spanish essayist and poet belonging to the Generation of '27. Though he wrote much of his poetry in French, he is considered one of the most influential figures in Spanish Surrealism.

== Life and career ==
Larrea was born in Bilbao and studied literature at the University of Salamanca. In 1921, he moved to Madrid, where he befriended Gerardo Diego and Vicente Huidobro, becoming deeply involved in the Ultraist movement. Searching for a new poetic language, he moved to Paris in 1926. There, along with Peruvian poet César Vallejo, he founded the ephemeral but influential magazine Favorables París Poema.

During his time in France, Larrea's work came under the influence of Surrealism. His poetry from this period, largely written in French, remained unpublished for decades until the release in Italy and Spain of his Versión celeste in 1969 (Note: Although written decades earlier, the 1969 publication of Versión celeste was a landmark event for Hispanic letters, revealing the full extent of Larrea's contribution to the Surrealist movement.). Larrea challenged the view, common in criticism from the 1960s onwards, that he was a surrealiat. Calling himself a 'mystic of poetry', he affirmed that the label which best suited him was that of being an ultraist ((cf.ultraísmo)).

Following the Spanish Civil War, Larrea went into exile. After a stay in Mexico, where he founded the magazine Cuadernos Americanos, he moved to the United States (receiving a Guggenheim Fellowship in 1949) and finally settled in Argentina in 1956. He taught at the National University of Córdoba, where he dedicated his later years to complex essays on teleology, mysticism, and the symbolic meaning of Machu Picchu.

== Relationship with Picasso and Guernica ==
Larrea played a pivotal role in the creation of one of the 20th century's most famous artworks. Immediately after the 26 April 1937 bombing of Guernica, Larrea, who at the time was a member of the Board of Cultural Relations and served in that capacity as an attaché at the Spanish Embassy in Paris, visited Pablo Picasso in his Paris studio. As a witness to the emotional impact of the tragedy on the Spanish diaspora, he urged Picasso to make the bombing the subject for the large mural commissioned by the Spanish Republican government for the 1937 Paris World's Fair. This intervention resulted in the anti-war masterpiece Guernica. Larrea would later write extensively on the painting's symbolism in his book The Vision of the "Guernica" (1947).

== Archaeological legacy ==
An incessant collector of pre-Columbian art, Larrea amassed a significant collection of Inca artifacts. In 1937, amidst the Civil War, he donated a substantial portion of his collection to the National Archaeological Museum of Spain to ensure its preservation.

== Selected works ==
=== Poetry ===
- Oscuro dominio (1935)
- Versión celeste (1969)
- Orbe (1990, posthumous)

=== Essays ===
- Arte Peruano (1935)
- Rendición de Espíritu (1943)
- El Surrealismo entre Viejo y Nuevo mundo (1944)
- The Vision of the "Guernica" (1947)
- La Religión del Lenguaje Español (1951)
- La Espada de la Paloma (1956)
- César Vallejo o Hispanoamérica en la Cruz de su Razón (1958)
- Teleología de la cultura (1965)
- Del surrealismo a Machu Picchu (1967)
- Guernica (1977)
