= Carlos Díaz "Caíto" =

Argentine singer-songwriter and guitarist

Carlos Díaz "Caíto" (1945–2004) was an Argentine singer-songwriter and guitarist who lived in Mexico for most of his career.

== Biography ==
He was born in 1945 in Mar de Plata, in the Buenos Aires Province and started creating music from the age of eight. At age 15, he entered the Conservatory and started making professional recordings. After touring South America and Europe, he arrived in Mexico in 1977 along with the Uruguayan singer-songwriter Alfredo Zitarrosa. He decided to settle in Mexico City and joined the group Sanampay, which was made up of both Mexican and exiled Argentinian musicians, recording three albums with the group.

In 1981, he resumed his solo career, singing songs by Zitarossa, Luis Eduardo Aute and Pablo Milanés in addition to his own compositions.

He died of lung cancer in Mexico City on 8 November 2004, age 59, after a short illness. He was survived by his long-time partner and their daughter.

== Discography ==
- Caito en Bossa, Argentina 1972
- Caito en Guitarra y Canciones, Argentina 1972
- Caito en Bossa y Algo Mas, Argentina 1974
- Guitarra Negra, México 1977 (with Alfredo Zitarrosa)
- Yo Te Nombro, México 1978 (with Sanampay)
- Coral Terrestre, México 1980 (with Sanampay)
- A Pesar de Todo, México 1981 (with Sanampay)
- De Alguna Manera- Caito, México 1982
- Dentro – Caito, México 1984
- Guadalupe Pineda y Caito, México 1985
- Carlos Diaz "Caito" – Vol. 1, México 1986
- Amigos Mios- Caito y Transito, México 1988
- Personal – Caito, México 1989
- Canciones de Amor y Rosas, México 1993
- En Concierto- Caito, México 1995
- Tangos – Caito, México 1996
- Las Malas Compañias, México 1997
- Simplemente, México 1998
- Caito Canta a Zitarrosa, México 1998
- Ay Amor, México 1998 (with Adriana Landeros)
- Amada, México 2001
- Humor en Serio, México 2001
- Guitarra Amada, México 2002
- Sólo Para Amorosos, México 2002
- Pasaba Por Aquí, México 2003
- Y el Amor..., México 2004
- El Aute de Amar, México 2004 (with Adriana Landeros and Luis Eduardo Aute)
- Méexicano, México 2005
- Encuentro Norte-Sur (with Armando Arenas and Jacqueline Levot), 2006
