= Pablo de Rokha =

Chilean poet (1894–1968)

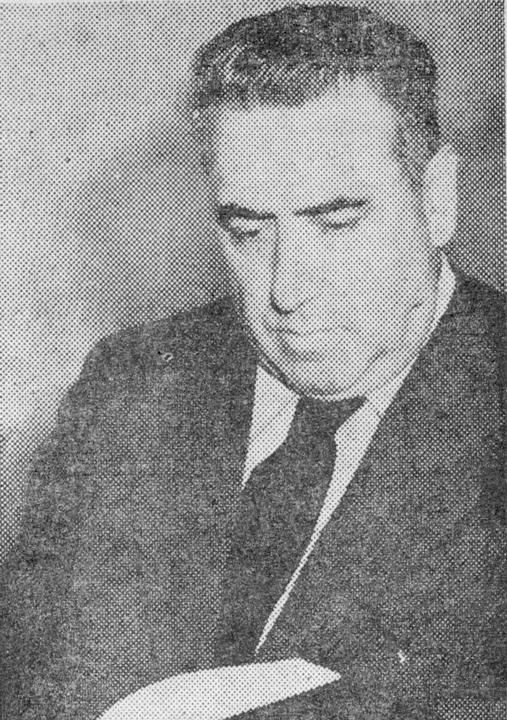
- Born: Carlos Ignacio Díaz Loyola; 17 October 1894; Licantén, Provincia de Curicó, Chile
- Died: 10 September 1968 (aged 73); Santiago, Provincia de Santiago, Chile
- Cause of death: Suicide
- Resting place: Santiago General Cemetery
- Occupation: Poet
- Spouse: Winétt de Rokha (m. 1916; died 1951)
- Children: 9, including Carlos de Rokha; Lukó de Rokha
- Relatives: Mahfúd Massís (son-in-law)
- Writing career
- Pen name: Pablo de Rokha
- Language: Spanish
- Notable awards: National Prize for Literature, 1965
- Literary movement: Vanguardismo

Signature
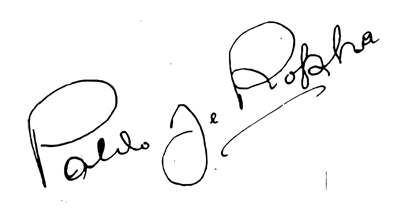

Carlos Ignacio Díaz Loyola (17 October 1894 – 10 September 1968), known by the pseudonym Pablo de Rokha, was a Chilean vanguard poet. Awarded the Chilean National Prize for Literature in 1965, de Rokha is considered one of the four greats of Chilean poetry.

== Early life and education ==
Carlos Ignacio Díaz Loyola was born on 17 October 1894 in Licantén, Provincia de Curicó (present-day, Maule Region) to Ignacio Díaz Alvarado and Laura Loyola Muñoz. De Rokha was baptized on 24 October 1894. His family was middle class farmers from a rural area and de Rokha's father did various jobs to earn a living, such as a farm manager and a chief customs officer in the Andes border crossings. De Rokha spent his childhood on the farm "Pocoa de Corinto" (Pocoa of Corinth farm) where his father was working as manager, and used to accompany his father to the Andes border crossings.

In 1901, de Rokha joined Public School Number 3 in the town of Talca. The following year he joined the San Pelayo de Talca Seminary, from which he was expelled in 1911 for reading 'forbidden' authors like Rabelais and Voltaire and showing them to his classmates. His classmates give him the nickname "El amigo piedra" (The Stone/Rock Friend) which he would later transform into "Pablo de Rokha" (Pablo of Stone), although in this early period his work was signed under the pseudonym of Job Díaz.

Having been expelled from the seminary gave him the chance to move to Santiago, Chile, where he finished the last year of secondary school and enrolled to study Law and Engineering at the University of Chile. However, he soon left the university and dedicated his life to poetry and bohemian Santiago. Around that time he made friends with other intellectuals like Pedro Sienna, Ángel Cruchaga Santa María and Vicente Huidobro, the latter of whom would become the father of the creationism movement. De Rokha also discovered the philosophy of Friedrich Nietzsche, the poète maudit and Walt Whitman, with whom he identified strongly. He also worked as journalist for two newspapers "La razón" (Reason) and "La mañana" (The Morning), and published some of his first poems in the magazine "Juventud" (Youth).

== Career ==
De Rokha returned to Talca in 1914 feeling that he had failed in his goals. There, he read the collection of poems "Lo que me dijo el silencio" (What the silence told me) by Juana Inés de la Cruz, the first pseudonym of Luisa Anabalón Sanderson. Despite criticizing the poetry harshly, he fell in love with their writer and returned to Santiago in search of her. In 1916, Luisa Anabalón became his wife, changing her pseudonym to Winétt de Rokha.

The poet went to the house of his future in-laws with a determined attitude, introducing himself as "a poet, and a very proud one". He was not welcomed by the family and became an enemy of his future father-in-law, Don Indalecio, to the point where they challenged each other to a duel. Before the agreed date of the duel, the young poet kidnapped Luisa and married her immediately. Years later the poet remembered the incident with his in-laws:

"¡Qué se había creído! El coronel Anabalón enseñándole urbanidad a mi heroísmo, como un elefante que le tirase la barba al mundo y más encima la suegra peluda y metafórica como el patíbulo."

"Who did he think he was! The colonel Anabalón teaching manners to my heroism, like an elephant pulling his beard at the world, and, on top of that, the mother in law hairy and metaphoric as the gallows."

That year (1916) the poet published a collection of poems, "Versos de infancia" (Verses from childhood), in the anthology "Selva lírica" (Lyric Jungle).

Between 1922 and 1924, de Rokha lived in San Felipe and Concepcion, where he founded the magazine Dynamo. Times were turbulent both in Chile and abroad, with the old oligarchic order declining in Chile and the powers of Fascism, Nazism and Stalinism in the ascendency in Europe, leading gradually to the Second World War. It was also a time when working-class people began to be able to participate in political life, empowered by the advance of industrialization and democracy in Latin America. By 1930, Pablo de Rokha was already a strong supporter of Marxism–Leninism and Soviet Stalinism, which he linked to Christian ethics. This led him to join the Communist Party of Chile in 1936 and adhere to the Popular Front of Chile that brought to power President Pedro Aguirre Cerda in 1938. The Communist Party made him a congressional candidate but was then expelled from the party in 1940, after his disinterest in following party discipline and his attacks on older comrades made him unpopular with the party leaders.

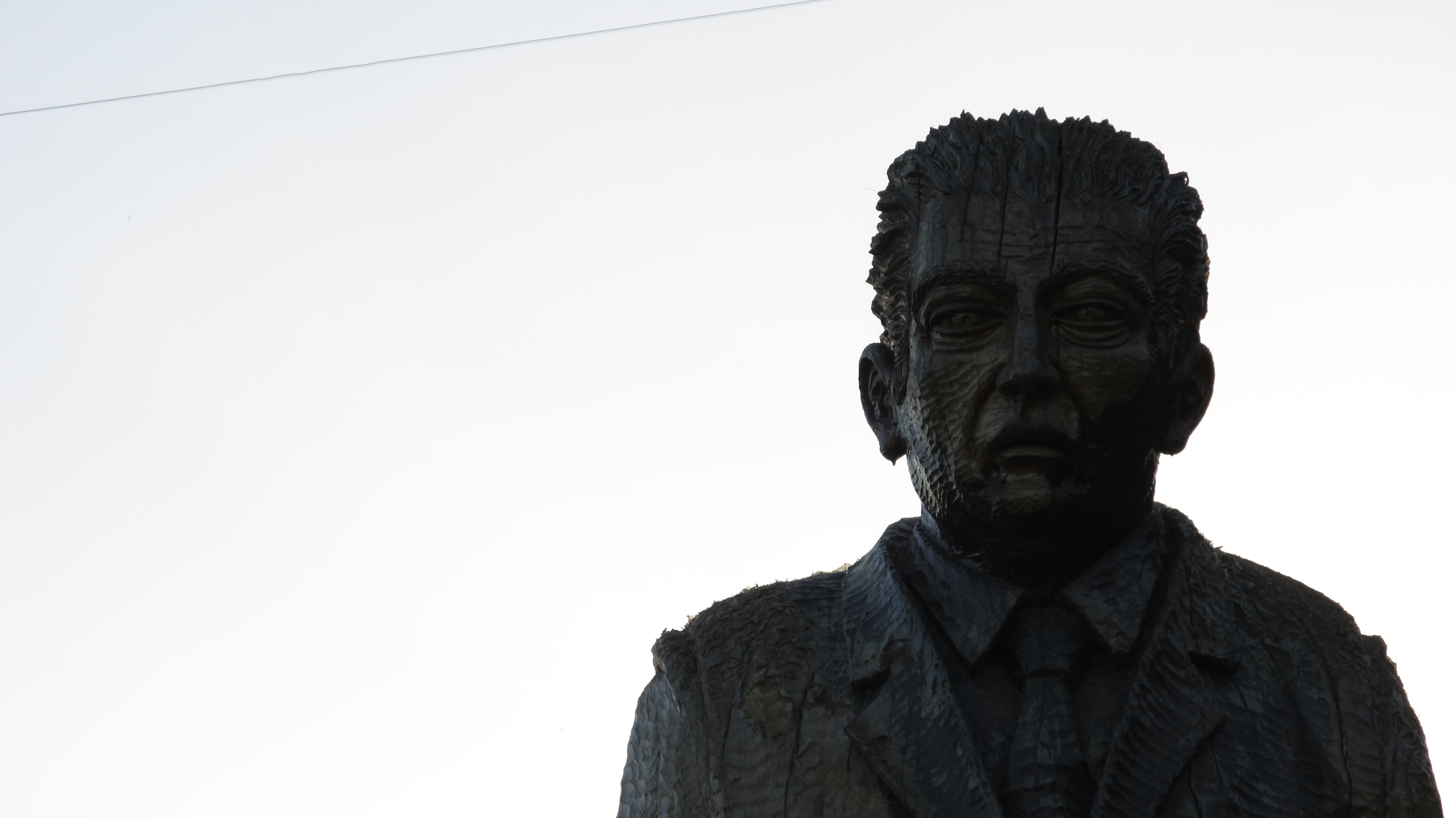
Statue of de Rokha in his hometown of Licantén, Chile

De Rokha edited, published and sold his own books, never accepting the support of publishing companies, and bought, sold and bartered a variety of goods to support his family.

In 1944, de Rokha was named Cultural Ambassador of Chile in the Americas by President Juan Antonio Ríos and began a long trip through the 19 countries of the continent. While he was in Argentina, he heard that a new president had been elected, President Gabriel González Videla, who, soon after his election, created the "Law in Defence of Democracy", which began a period of persecution of the Communist party.

In 1949, de Rokha returned to Chile, accompanied by his wife Winétt de Rokha, who was suffering from cancer. She died in 1951, and in 1953, de Rokha published "Fuego Negro", a love elegy dedicated to his late wife. The death of Winétt was first of a series of tragic events for the family. In 1962, his son Carlos de Rokha (part of the literary generation of 1938 and one of the youngest members of La Mandragora group) died at the age of 42 from a drug overdose. It is not known if his death was an accident or suicide. The death of Carlos affected de Rokha deeply, and he wrote "Carta perdida a Carlos de Rokha" (Lost Letter to Carlos de Rokha):

"The mark of genius of Winétt de Rokha pursued you, like a great eagle of fire, from the cradle to the grave, but did not influence you, because no one on earth influenced you. Forgive me for having given you life."

== Work ==
In Chile, important critics of the time such as Hernán Díaz Arrieta ("Alone") and Raul Silva Castro despised de Rokha's work. However, today his writing is widely studied and the poet is considered one of The four greats of Chilean poetry, along with Neruda, Huidobro and Mistral.

The literary critic Naín Nómez divides de Rokha's work into three stages. The first covers the period from 1916 to 1929, characterized by the influence of romanticism and his anarchic ideas, mixed with biblical and religious elements. In this period he ran the magazine "Numen", published his work "El folletín del Diablo" (The Devil's Pamphlet) in the magazine "Claridad" (Clarity), self-published his books "Los gemidos" (The Groans, 1922), "U" (1926), "Satanás, Suramérica" (Satan, South America, 1927), "Heroísmo sin alegría" (Heroism without joy, 1927), and "Escritura de Raimundo Contreras" (Works of Reimundo Contreras, 1929). He was largely ignored by the critics, who were more interested in modernism, the popular trend of the time.

The 1930 to 1950 period was marked by political activism, exemplified by "Canto de trinchera" (Trench song, 1929–1933), "Imprecación a la bestia fascista" (Curse the fascist beast, 1937), "Cinco cantos rojos" (Five red songs, 1938), "Morfología del espanto" (Morphology of terror, 1942), "Arenga sobre el arte" (Rant about art, 1949) and "Carta magna de América" (Magna Carta of America, 1948). In 1939, de Rokha founded his own magazine, "Multitud: revista del pueblo y la alta cultura" (Multitud: magazine of the people and high culture), which would later become a publishing house.

In the third stage, covering his last two decades, de Rokha's works showed a mixture of optimism, social protest and lost love following the death of his wife, as can be seen in his work "Fuego negro" (Black fire, 1953). His famous rivalry with Pablo Neruda was heightened by the publication of the essay "Neruda y Yo" (Neruda and I, 1955), in which de Rokha referred to Neruda as a "bourgois artist" and accused him of plagiarism. The controversy continued with his book "Genio del pueblo" (Genius of the people, 1960), an imagined conversation between 111 characters from high and popular culture including Neruda, who appears under the name Casiano Basualto. In 1961, de Rokha released "Acero de Invierno" (Winter steel), which included the poem "Canto del macho anciano" (Song of the elder male). In 1965, he won the National Prize for Literature, and said at the ceremony: "It came late, almost as a compliment, and because they believed I was not going to cause any more trouble". In 1967 he published his last book, Mundo a mundo: Francia (World to world: France).

== Example of work ==
Autorretrato de adolescencia

Entre serpientes verdes y verbenas,
mi condición de león domesticado
tiene un rumor lacustre de colmenas
y un ladrido de océano quemado.

Ceñido de fantasmas y cadenas,
soy religión podrida y rey tronchado,
o un castillo feudal cuyas almenas
alzan tu nombre como un pan dorado.

Torres de sangre en campos de batalla,
olor a sol heroico y a metralla,
a espada de nación despavorida.

Se escuchan en mi ser lleno de muertos
y heridos, de cenizas y desiertos,
en donde un gran poeta se suicida.

Self-portrait of adolescence

Among green snakes and verbenas,
my status of a tame lion
has a lackluster buzz of hives
and a bark of burned ocean.

With ghosts and chains that cling
I'm a rotten religion and a fallen king,
or a feudal castle whose battlements
raise your name like golden bread.

Towers of blood on battlefields,
Smell of heroic sun and shrapnel,
of the sword of a terrified nation.

They are heard in my being, full of the dead
and wounded, of ashes and deserts,
where a great poet commits suicide.

== Personal life ==
The family was growing fast with the birth of many children: Carlos (the poet known as Carlos de Rokha), Lukó (the painter known as Lukó de Rokha), Tomás, Carmen, Juana Inés, José (the painter known as José de Rokha), Pablo, Laura and Flor. Several of them died prematurely: Carmen and Tomás very young, while Carlos and Pablo both died. When the poet was older, legally adopted a baby girl called Sandra.

On 10 September 1968, de Rokha died by suicide. de Rokha used a Smith & Wesson .44 revolver which had been a gift from David Alfaro Siqueiros. Two hours after de Rokha's death officials from the La Reina commune arrived at his home to inform him that the authorities had decided to change the name of the street in his honour.

== See also ==
- Chilean literature
- Chilean culture
