= Vicente Huidobro =

Chilean poet (1893–1948)

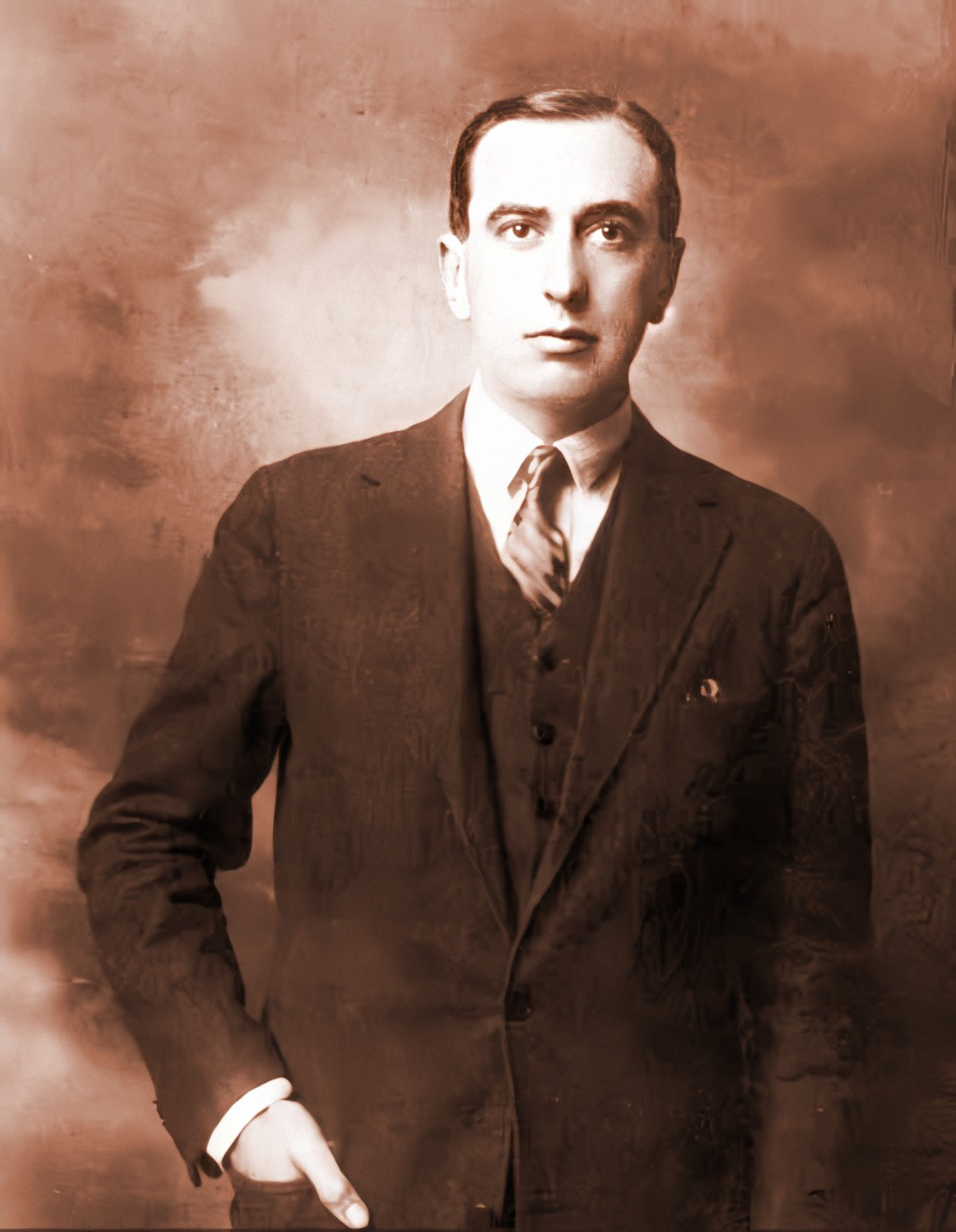
- Huidobro in the early 20th century
- Born: Vicente García-Huidobro Fernández; 10 January 1893; Santiago, Chile
- Died: 2 January 1948 (aged 54); Cartagena, Chile
- Resting place: Casa Museo Vicente Huidobro
- Education: University of Chile
- Occupations: Poet; writer; editor; literary critic
- Spouse(s): Manuela Portales Bello (m. 1912) Ximena Amunátegui; Raquel Señoret
- Children: 5
- Mother: María Luisa Fernández
- Writing career
- Pen name: Vicente Huidobro
- Language: Spanish
- Genre: Poetry
- Notable works: Altazor, 1931
- Movement: Creationism

Signature
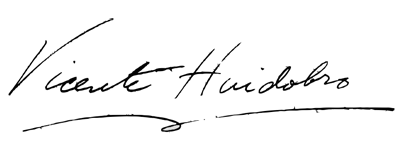

Vicente García-Huidobro Fernández (Latin American Spanish: [biˈsente ɣwiˈðoβɾo]; January 10, 1893 – January 2, 1948), known by the pseudonym Vicente Huidobro, was a Chilean poet, writer, editor and literary critic. A proponent of the avant-garde, Huidobro was the founder of Creationism (Spanish: creacionismo) and is considered one of the four greats of Chilean poetry.

== Early life and education ==
Huidobro was born on 10 January 1893 in Santiago to Vicente García Huidobro and María Luisa Fernández, a feminist writer, editor, and poet. Through his parents Huidobro belonged to the Chilean aristocracy and was of Spanish descent.

He spent his first years in Europe, and was educated by French and English governesses. Once his family was back in Chile, Vicente was enrolled at the Colegio San Ignacio, a Jesuit secondary school in Santiago, where he was expelled for wearing a ring that he claimed was a wedding ring.

In 1910 he studied literature at the Instituto Pedagogico of the University of Chile, but a good part of his knowledge of literature and poetry came from his mother, poet María Luisa Fernández Bascuñán. She used to host "tertulias" or salons in the family home, where sometimes up to 60 people came to talk and to listen to her talk about literature, with guests including members of the family and servants. Later, in 1912, she would help him financially and emotionally to publish his first magazine "Musa Joven" (Young Muse).

== Career ==
In 1911 he published Ecos del alma (Echoes of the Soul), a work with modernist tones. In 1913 he published Canciones en la noche (Songs in the Night). The book included some poems previously published in "Musa Joven" as well as his first calligram, "Triángulo armónico" ("Harmonic Triangle").

In 1913, along with Carlos Díaz Loyola (better known as Pablo de Rokha), he published three issues of the magazine Azul (Blue), and published both Canciones en la noche and La gruta del silencio (The Grotto of Silence). The next year, he gave a lecture, Non serviam, in which he reflected on his aesthetic vision. The same year, in "Pasando y Pasando" (“Passing and Passing”), Vicente explained his religious doubts, earning himself the reproach of both his family and the Jesuits.

The same year, he published "Las pagodas ocultas" (1916), and signed it for the first time as Vicente Huidobro.

=== Move abroad ===
In 1916, he traveled to Buenos Aires with Teresa Wilms Montt, a young poet whom he had rescued from a convent. While in Buenos Aires, Huidobro outlined his creationism literary theory, later a literary movement, and published "El espejo de agua" (The Mirror of Water).

Also in 1916, he moved to Europe with his wife and children. While passing through Madrid, he met Rafael Cansino Assens, with whom he had exchanged letters since 1914.

He settled in Paris and published Adán (1916), a work that began his next phase of artistic development. Huidobro met and mixed with most of the Parisian avant garde of this period: Pablo Picasso, Juan Gris, Jacques Lipchitz, Francis Picabia, Joan Miró, Max Ernst, Paul Éluard, Amedeo Modigliani and Blaise Cendrars.

In 1917, he contributed to the magazine Nord-Sud edited by Pierre Reverdy, along with Guillaume Apollinaire, Tristan Tzara, Jean Cocteau, André Breton, Louis Aragon and Max Jacob, until a disagreement with Reverdy forced him to leave the magazine. That same year he published Horizon carré, including poems previously shown in "El espejo de agua" translated to French with the help of Juan Gris.

In October 1918, Huidobro traveled to Madrid, making the first in a series of annual trips to that city. There he shared both Creacionismo and his knowledge of the Parisian vanguard with the artistic elite. In Madrid, Vicente met with Robert and Sonia Delaunay, refugees in Spain, and resumed his friendship with Rafael Cansinos-Assens. He started the literary movement Ultraísmo, corresponded with Tristan Tzara and collaborated with him on his Dadaist magazine.

In 1919, he brought to Madrid a rough draft of the series of poems that would eventually become his masterpiece, Altazor. That same year, he took some science classes and became interested in esoteric subjects like astrology, alchemy, ancient Kabbalah among other forms of occultism.

While in Paris, he worked with Amédée Ozenfant and Le Corbusier (Charles-Édouard Jeanneret-Gris) at L' Esprit Nóuveau, a magazine directed by Paul Dermée. There he also worked for the Spanish magazines "Grecia", "Cervantes", "Tableros" and "Ultra".

In the El Liberal, a Spanish newspaper, journalist and literary critic Enrique Gómez Carrillo published an interview with Pierre Reverdy where he accuses Huidobro of antedating the edition of "El espejo de agua" and claims that he himself created "creacionismo". Grecia magazine took Huidobro's side, and between August and September Huidobro traveled to Madrid to refute Gómez Carrillo's claims.

Triangulo Armonico his first calligram

=== Altazor and creacionismo ===
In 1921, Huidobro founded and edited an international art magazine, Creación (Creation), in Madrid. The magazine featured a Lipchitz sculpture and paintings by Georges Braque, Picasso, Juan Gris and Albert Gleizes. In November he printed a second issue in Paris, titled Création Revue d'Art. In December he presented his famous lecture, La Poesía (Poetry), which served as prologue to his works Temblor de Cielo (Tremor of Heaven), and "Saisons Choisies" (Chosen Seasons).

The next year, Huidobro presented his theory of "Pure Creation" at "Branche Studio" in Paris, and then in Berlin and Stockholm.He wrote for the Polish magazine "Nowa Sztuka". In Paris, his "Painted poems" exhibition at the Théâtre Edouard VII was shut down for being too "disruptive".

In 1923, he published "Finis Britannia", a critique of the British empire, which provoked antipathy from the British and resulted in him receiving a postcard in support from Mahatma Gandhi. In 1924 he was -arguably- kidnapped for this reason, disappearing for three days. Later in an interview, he briefly commented that the perpetrators of the kidnap were two "Irish scouts" but refused to give more details.

Huidobro continued with his diverse artistic activities in Europe, producing the third edition of "Création", where he published his "Manifeste peut-être" (Maybe Manifesto). Collaborator in this edition included Tristan Tzara, René Crevel, Juan Larrea and Erik Satie. He joined the French Masonic Lodge and met Spanish philosopher and writer Miguel de Unamuno, who was exiled in Paris at the time.

In 1925 he returned to Chile, where he edited and published "Acción. Diario de Purificación Nacional" (Action: Journal of National Purification) a political newspaper where he criticised the state and reported fraudulent activities. He was consequently assaulted and beaten outside his home and, on 21 November, the newspaper was shut down. He started another newspaper, "La reforma" (Reform), in a symbolic gesture, young supporters of the progressive party declared him as their candidate for president. A bomb was then set off outside his house, though Huidobro escaped unharmed. While in Chile, he wrote for the publications "Andamios", "Panorama" and "Ariel" and published "Automne Régulier" (Regular Autumn) and "Tout à coup" (Suddenly).

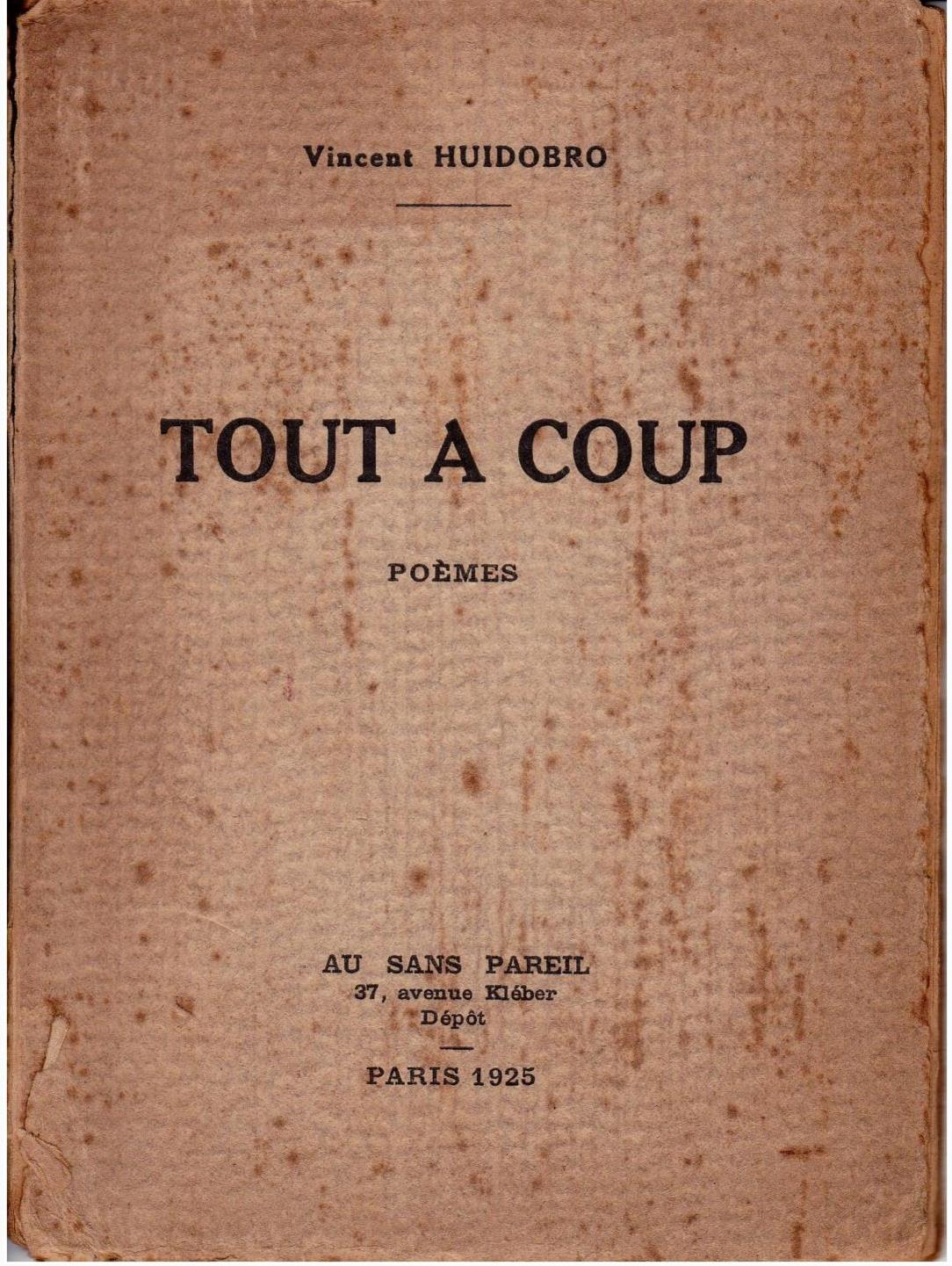
Tout a coup (1925)

In 1926, he published a fragment of what would become the fourth canto of "Altazor" in "Panorama".

In 1927, he traveled to New York, where he met Charlie Chaplin, Douglas Fairbanks and Gloria Swanson, wrote a script for a film of his novel "Cagliostro", and wrote the "Canto a Lindbergh" (Song for Lindbergh) dedicated to aviator Charles Lindbergh.

He returned to Europe by the late 1920s, where he began to write the novel, Mío Cid Campeador; he also continued his work on Altazor and began Temblor de Cielo (Tremor of Heaven). It was at this time that he discovered that he was heir to the Marquisate of Casa Real. He also participated in the Mandrágora, a Chilean surrealist movement founded in 1938. There was a scandal when he married Ximena Amunátegui in a Muslim ceremony.

In 1930, while in the Italian Alps, he wrote "La Proxima" (The Next), and published his poem "Chanson de l'oeuf et de l'infini" (Song of the Egg and Infinity) in the magazine "Revue Européenne" and a fragment of "Altazor", in French, in the June edition of "Transition".

In 1931, he went back to Madrid to publish "Altazor", where he attended Federico García Lorca's poetry recital "Poet in New York" and started his friendship with Uruguayan painter Joaquín Torres García. The same year he published "Portrait of a Paladin" and the English versions of his "Mío Cid Campeador", "Temblor de Cielo" and "Altazor".

=== Return to Chile ===
Huidobro went back to Chile in 1932, under the pressure of the Great Depression. In Chile, he published "Gilles de Raíz".

In 1933, he got involved with the Communist Party of Chile and published his article "Manifiesto a la juventud de Hispanoamérica" (Manifesto to the Youth of Hispano America) in Barcelona's "Europa" magazine, where he proposed the creation of a united republic formed of Bolivia, Chile, Paraguay and Uruguay.

In 1934 he wrote film reviews for Santiago magazines and newspapers, and published "La Próxima" (The Next) (Santiago, Walton); "Papá o el diario de Alicia Mir" (Father, or the diary of Alicia Mir) (Santiago, Walton), a novel written as a diary; and the play "En la Luna" (In the Moon) (Santiago, Ercilla). He founded the magazine Vital/Ombligo with Omar Cáceres and Eduardo Anguita.

In 1935 a young Volodia Teitelboim read a Rabindranath Tagore poem, similar to Poem 16 of Neruda's Twenty Love Poems and a Song of Despair, Teitelboim mentioned this to Huidobro, and Huidobro accused Neruda of plagiarism. This would initiate a conflict between Neruda and Huidobro that later would involve Pablo de Rokha.

In 1936, along with Picasso, Arp, Kandinsky, and Robert and Sonia Delaunay among others, he signed the "Dimensionist Manifesto"

In 1937, while in Spain supporting the republican cause, the conflict with Neruda resurfaced while Neruda was also supporting the republicans. The Parisian "Association Internationale des Ecrivains pour la Défense de la Culture", sending them a letter which called on them to change their attitude, signed by Tristan Tzara, Alejo Carpentier, César Vallejo and Juan Larrea, among others.

Once back in Chile, he published the prose poem "Fuera de aquí" (Out of Here), arguing against Italian fascism and the Italian military (who were visiting Chile at that time), as well as the poem "Gloria y Sangre" (Glory and Blood) in "Madre España: Homenaje de los poetas chilenos" (Mother Spain: Tribute of the Chilean poets). In 1938 his mother died, and he became part of the creation of the Chilean surrealist group La Mandrágora. The first meetings of the group took place in his home.

In 1942, Huidobro published the second editions of "Temblor de cielo", "Cagliostro" and "Mio Cid Campeador" in Santiago.

In 1944, he edited and published the first and last edition of "Actual", the final magazine he would create. In November of that year he traveled back to Europe and made a stop in Montevideo, Uruguay to give a lecture on "Introducción a la poesía" (Introduction to Poetry).

In 1945 he went to Paris as a correspondent for “La Voz de América". In Paris, he received a letter from his wife Ximena informing him of her wish for a divorce. He entered Berlin (as a war correspondent) with the Allies. He was discharged and went back to Santiago with his third wife, Raquel Señoret.

In 1946 he settled in Cartagena, a seaside town in central Chile, and published a new edition of "Trois Nouvelles Exemplaires", with text written in collaboration with Jean Arp.

== Personal life ==
=== Family ===
On 12 April 1912, Huidobro married Manuela Portales Bello. Together Huidobro and Bello had four children.

In 1926, Huidobro met his 14 year old sister-in-law Ximena Amunátegui, the daughter of Domingo Amunátegui. In 1928, Huidobro secretly traveled from Paris to Santiago with the intention of returning to France with Amunátegui. Telling her parents that she was going to the dentist after school, Amunátegui secretly met up with Huidobro. Returning to Paris, Huidobro and Amunátegui married and together had one son.

In 1945, Amunátegui left Huidobro for the poet and professor Godofredo Iommi.

=== Final years and death ===
In 1947, Huidobro suffered a stroke attributed to his war wounds, and died on 2 January 1948, in his Cartagena house. According to his wishes, he was buried on a hill facing the sea. His eldest daughter Manuela and Eduardo Anguita wrote the epitaph: "Aquí yace el poeta Vicente Huidobro / Abrid la tumba / Al fondo de esta tumba se ve el mar". (Here lies the poet Vicente Huidobro / Open the tomb / At the bottom you can see the sea). That same year, Manuela published unedited texts and poems previously seen only in magazines.

Huidobro wrote over thirty works, including books of poetry and poetic narrative, of which more than a dozen were published posthumously.

== Legacy ==
On January 10, 2020, Google celebrated his 127th birthday with a Google Doodle.

The Spanglish novel Yo-Yo Boing! (1998) by Puerto Rican poet Giannina Braschi features a debate about creators and masters of Spanish and Latin American poetry, including Huidobro, Luis Cernuda, Alberti, Vicente Aleixandre, Pedro Salinas, and Jorge Guillén.

Chile printed several postage stamps of portraits of Huidobro, including in 1986 and 1993.

=== Vicente Huidobro Museum and Foundation ===
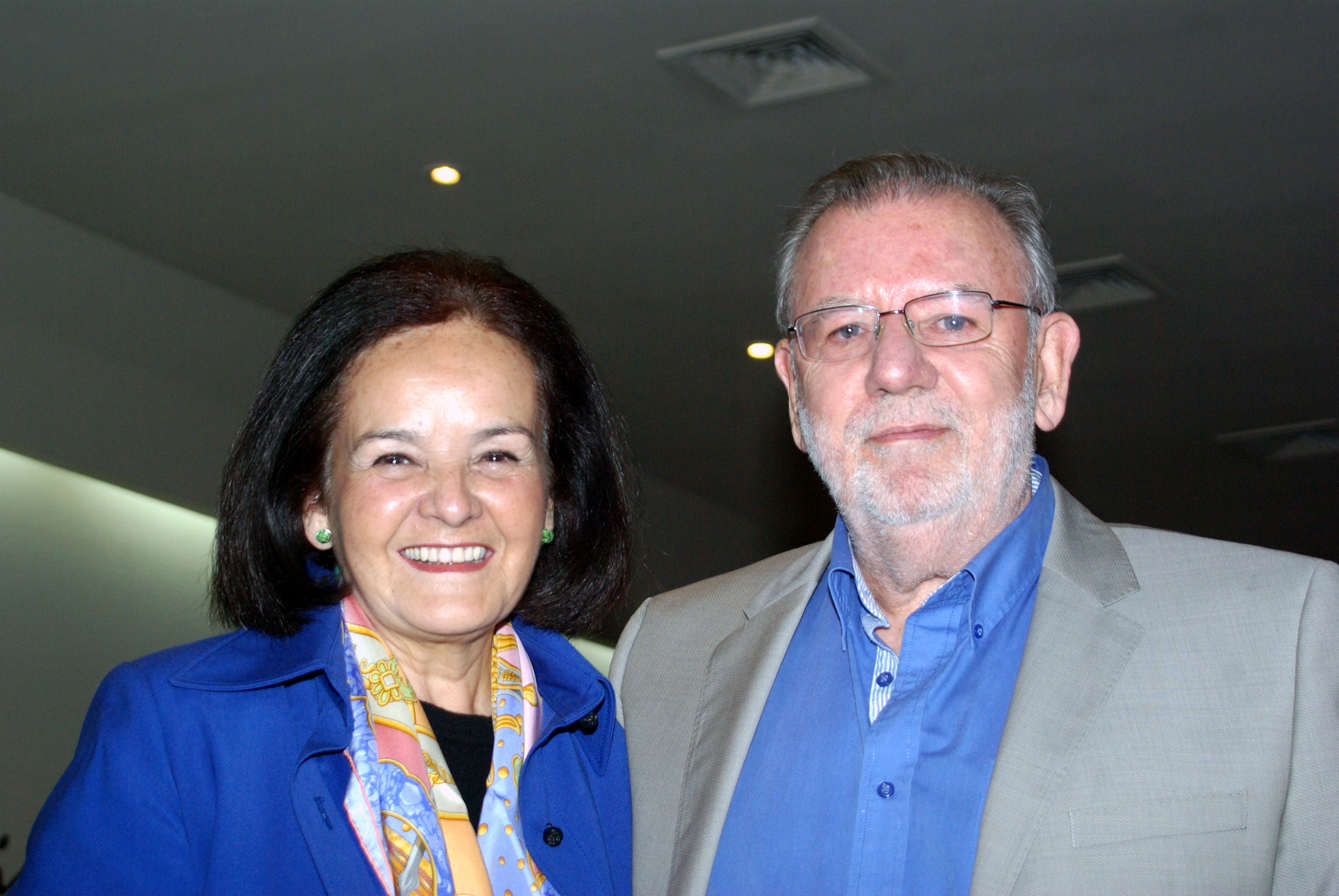
Chilean poet Oscar Hahn & Maria Teresa Herreros, board members of the Vicente Huidobro Foundation

The Vicente Huidobro Foundation was created in 1990, in order to preserve the poet's works. The foundation runs a research center and archive, which is open to researchers, students and general public. On 6 April 2013 Huidobro's house in Cartagena was converted into a museum, with help of funds from FONDART. The museum, which has six rooms and a floor space of 320 square metres, will be run by the Vicente Huidobro Foundation, and will showcase manuscripts, correspondence, first editions of Huidobro's works, photographs and his collection of African art, among other items.

== Bibliography ==
Poetry books

- Ecos del alma (Santiago: Imprenta Chide, 1911)
- Canciones en la noche (Santiago: Imprenta Chile, 1913)
- La gruta de silencio (Santiago: Imprenta Chile, 1913)
- Las pagodas ocultas (Santiago: Imprenta Universitaría, 1914)
- Adán (Santiago: Imprenta Universitaría, 1916)
- El espejo de agua (Buenos Aires: Editorial Orión, 1916)
- Horizon Carré (Paris: Editions Paul Birault, 1917)
- Tour Eiffel (Madrid: Imprenta Pueyo, 1918)
- Hallali (Madrid: Ediciones Jesús López, 1918)
- Ecuatorial (Madrid: Imprenta Pueyo, 1918)
- Poemas articos (Madrid: Imprenta Pueyo, 1918)
- Saisons choisies (Paris: Editions Le Cible, 1921)
- Automne régulier (Paris: Editions Librairie de France, 1925)
- Tout a Coup (Paris: Editions Au Sans Pareil, 1925)
- Altazor: el viaje en paracaídas (Madrid: Campañía Iberoamericana de Publications, 1931)
- Temblor de Cielo (Madrid: Editorial Plutarco, 1931)
- Ver y palpar (Santiago: Ediciones Ercilla, 1941)
- El ciudadano del Olvido (Santiago: Ediciones Ercilla, 1941)
- Antología de Vicente Huidobro (Santiago: Editorial Zig-Zag, 1945)
- Ultimos Poemas (Santiago: Talleres Gráficos Ahués Hnos, 1948)
- Poesías, edited with a prologue by Enrique Lihn (Havana: Casa de las Américas, 1968)
- Obras Completas de Vicente Huidobro (Santiago: Editorial Zig-Zag, 1964)
- Obras Completas de Vicente Huidobro (Santiago: Editorial Andres Bello, 1976)

English language translations

- The Relativity of Spring: 13 poems translated from the French, translated by Michael Palmer and Geoffrey Young (Berkeley, California: Sand Dollar, 1976)
- The Selected Poetry of Vicente Huidobro, edited by David Guss (New York: New Directions, 1981)
- Altazor, translated by Eliot Weinberger (Saint Paul, Minnesota: Graywolf Press, 1988)
- The Poet Is a Little God: Creationist Verse, translated by Jorge García-Gómez (Riverside, California: Xenos Books, 1990)

== Sources ==
- Perdigó, Luisa Marina (1994). The Origins of Vicente Huidobro's 'Creacionismo' (1911–1916) and its Evolution (1917–1947). New York: Mellen Press. ISBN 0773422994
