= Four greats of Chilean poetry =

The Four Greats of Chilean poetry (Spanish: Los cuatro grandes de la poesía chilena) is the name given to four Chilean poets considered the most important figures in 20th century Chilean poetry: Gabriela Mistral, Vicente Huidobro, Pablo de Rokha and Pablo Neruda.

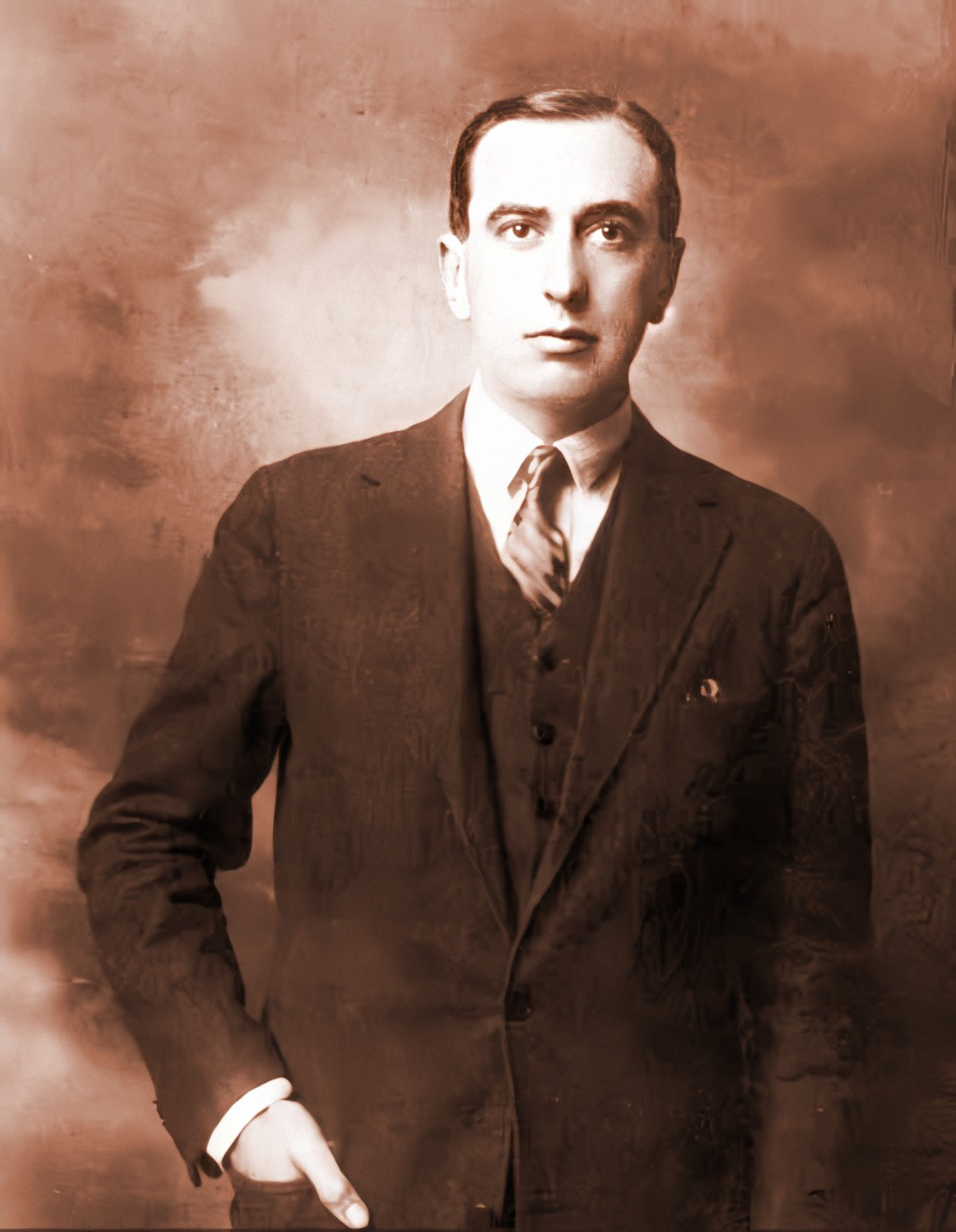
Vicente Huidobro (1893–1948)

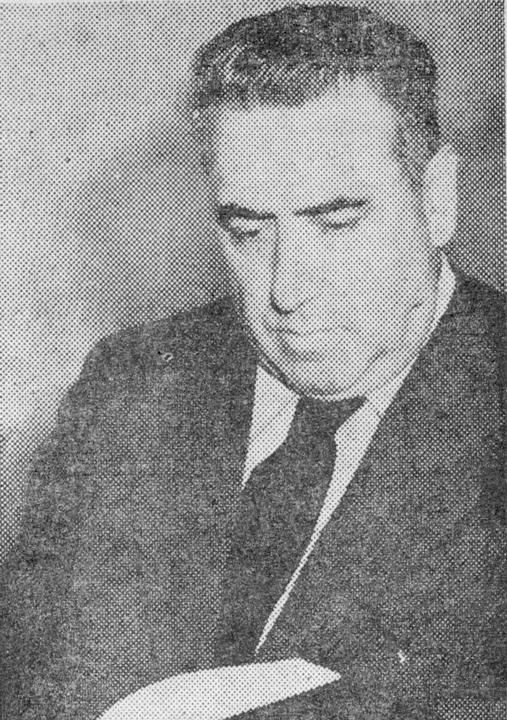
Pablo de Rokha (1894–1968)

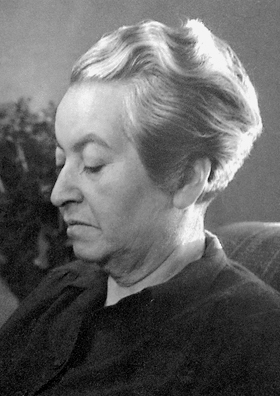
Gabriela Mistral (1889– 1957)

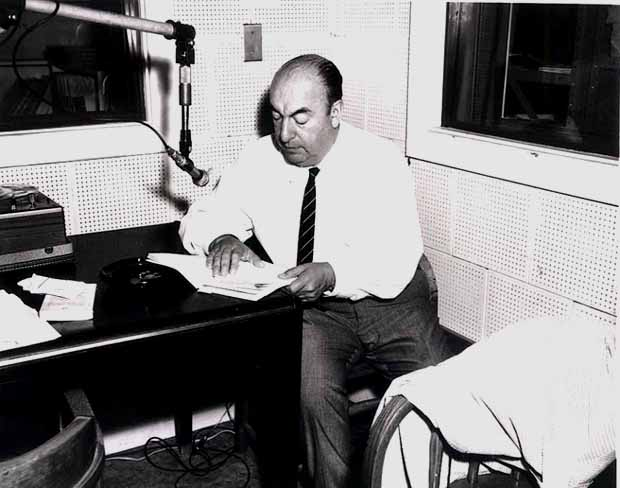
Pablo Neruda (1904–1973)

All four poets were actually linked to each other or met each other at some point in their lives. For example, while Gabriela Mistral was head teacher at the Girls’ High School in Temuco, Chile, and already recognized as an outstanding poet, a teenage boy came to her with his own poems, asking for her opinion. This teenager was Neftalí Reyes, who would later take the pseudonym of Pablo Neruda and become another great Chilean poet. He would also follow in Mistral’s footsteps when he won the Nobel Prize in Literature in 1971, 26 years after Mistral herself had won the highest honor in literature in 1945.

In contrast to this tenuous link, the relationship between Huidobro, De Rokha and Neruda was one of the most persistent rivalries in Chilean cultural history. They were peers, part of the same generation, and were all at some point in their lives members of the Chilean Communist Party. De Rokha would later be expelled from the party for some disagreement with the leaders, as they claim today.

Mistral expressed no political affiliation in Chile, although according to the Chilean writer Jaime Quezada, an expert on the work of Mistral, she expressed her Pan-Americanist will in her work "Tala", and expressed solidarity with the Nicaraguan revolutionary Augusto Sandino in two texts published in 1928.

The other three poets’ links with the Communist party was a reflection of the political climate at the time and their desire to fight for the social change in Chile. However, personal disputes played a more important role than politics in their relationship. Pablo de Rokha became one of Neruda’s bitterest enemies, considering him bourgeois and a hypocritical opportunist in political and social life. De Rokha wrote several essays and pamphlets in which he railed against Neruda, for example the poem “Tercetos Dantescos”:

Gallipavo senil y cogotero
de una poesía sucia, de macacos,
tienes la panza hinchada de dinero.

Translation:

Senile hypocrite and robber
of dirty monkey poetry,
your belly is bloated with money.

Huidobro joined the communist party earlier than Neruda, and was extremely politically active for much of his life. Towards the end of his life, however, he left the political sphere and retired to his house in Cartagena on the coast of Chile. Huidobro also accused Neruda of plagiarising Rabindranath Tagore and in November 1934, the second edition of "PRO" magazine published without comment two poems discovered by Huidobro’s friend Volodia Teitelboim: Tagore’s "Poem 30" from "The Gardener" and Neruda’s very similar "Poem 16" from "20 Poems of Love". Huidobro is also known to have referred to Neruda as a "Romantic Poet" who wrote poems for 15-year-old girls.

Neruda reacted to his peers’ criticism by writing a text called "Aquí estoy" (Here I am), published in Paris in 1938, where he denounced their animosity and vilification. Despite this criticism, Neruda is recognized as one of the twenty six authors that make up the Western canon of literature, along with Shakespeare, Dante, Chaucer, Cervantes, Michel de Montaigne, Molière, Milton, Samuel Johnson, Goethe, Wordsworth, Jane Austen, Walt Whitman, Emily Dickinson, Charles Dickens, George Eliot, Tolstoy, Ibsen, Freud, Proust, James Joyce, Virginia Woolf, Franz Kafka, Borges, Neruda, Fernando Pessoa, Samuel Beckett.

Neruda could put an end to the conflict once de Rokha and Huidobro were dead, instead in his speech at the Nobel Prize ceremony he says referring to Huidobro: "El poeta no es un pequeño Dios" (The poet is not a little god).

== See also ==
- Enrique Lihn
- Nicanor Parra
- Gonzalo Rojas
- Jorge Teillier
