= Carlos Jiménez Díaz =

Spanish physician and researcher

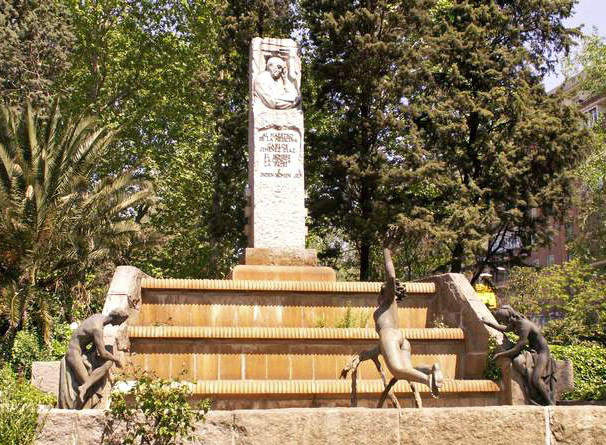
- Carlos Jiménez Díaz sculpture
- Born: Carlos Jiménez Díaz; 10 February 1898; Madrid, Spain
- Died: 18 May 1967 (aged 69); Madrid, Spain
- Education: Instituto San Isidro
- Alma mater: Central University of Madrid
- Occupation: Doctor

Carlos Jiménez Díaz (February 10, 1898 – May 18, 1967) was an important Spanish physician and clinical researcher.
