= Creationism (literary movement) =

Literary movement that started around 1912

Creationism (Spanish: creacionismo) was a literary movement initiated by Chilean poet Vicente Huidobro around 1912. Creationism is based on the idea of a poem as a truly new thing, created by the author for the sake of itself—that is, not to praise another thing, not to please the reader, not even to be understood by its own author.

Huidobro himself defined it as "a general aesthetic theory" rather than a school of art. He proposed that poetry should not be a commentary on something else. In his own words:

[A created poem] is a poem in which every constituent part, and the whole, show a new fact, independent of the external world, not bound to any other reality save its own, since it takes a place in the world as a singular phenomenon, separate and distinct from the other phenomena. That poem is something that cannot exist except inside the poet's head. And it is not beautiful because it commemorates something, it is not beautiful because it reminds us of things we have seen that were beautiful in turn, or because it describes beautiful things that may come to see. It is beautiful in itself and it does not admit terms of comparison. And neither can it be conceived outside the book. Nothing in the external world resembles it; it makes real what does not exist, that is to say, it turns itself into reality. It creates the wonderful and gives it a life of its own. It creates extraordinary situations that can never exist in the objective world, that they will have to exist in the poem so that they exist somewhere.

Huidobro cites as inspiration some "admirable poems" of Tristan Tzara, though their "creation" is more formal than fundamental, and also some works by Francis Picabia, Georges Ribémont Dessaignes, Paul Éluard, and the Spanish poets Juan Larrea and Gerardo Diego (which Huidobro calls "the two Spanish creationist poets".

The poet also claims that creationist poetry is by its own nature universal and universally translatable, "since the new facts remain identical in all languages", while the other elements that prevail in non-creationist poetry, such as the rhyme and music of the words, vary among languages and cannot be easily translated, thus causing the poem to lose part of its essence.

== See also ==
- Ultraist movement
- Generation of '27
- Mandrágora
