= Rafael Cansinos-Asséns =

Spanish writer (1882–1964)

Rafael Cansinos Asséns
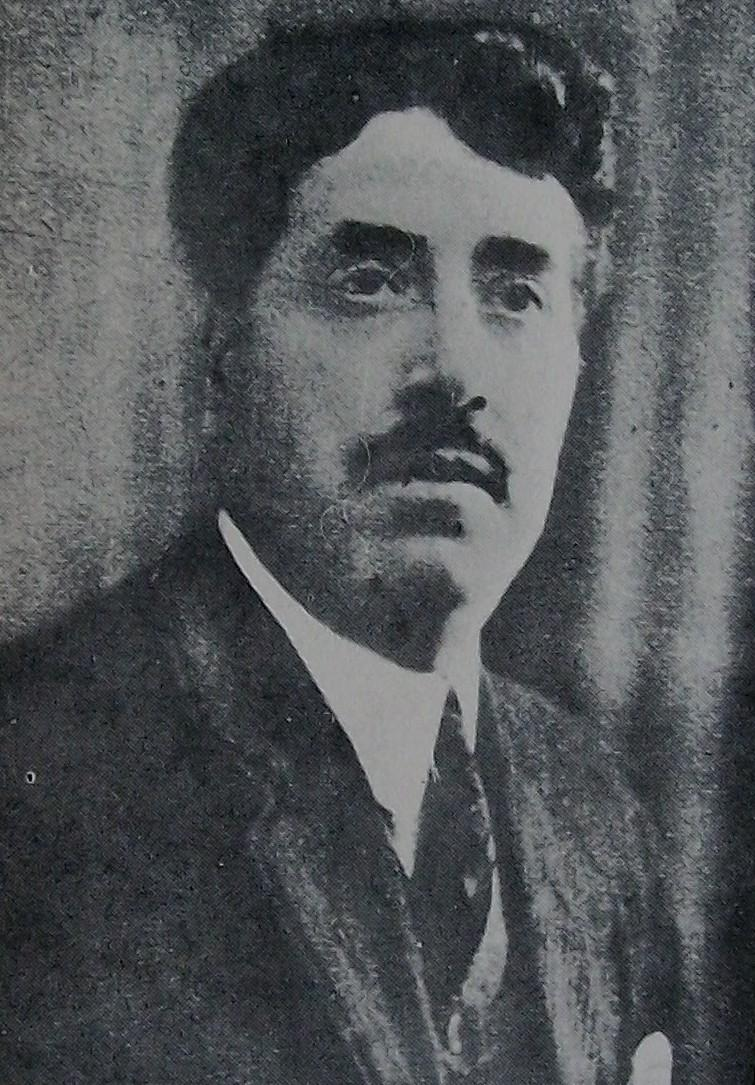
- Born: 24 November 1882; Seville
- Died: 6 July 1964 (aged 81); Madrid
- Occupations: Poet, novelist, essayist, literary critic and translator
- Writing career
- Language: Spanish

Rafael Cansinos Asséns (24 November 1882 – 6 July 1964) was a Spanish poet, novelist, essayist, literary critic and translator.

== Biography ==
Cansinos was born in Seville on 24 November 1882. Through his father's paternal line, he is related to the Cansino Family and Rita Hayworth.

Cansinos was a polyglot; he translated The Arabian Nights into Spanish, as well as the works of Dostoyevsky, and the complete works of Goethe for the publisher Aguilar. He was among the contributors of the Madrid-based avant-garde magazine Prometeo.

In the lectures he gave in 1967 at Harvard, Jorge Luis Borges mentioned him as one of his masters, and expressed wonder at the fact that he has been forgotten.

== Works ==
=== Essays ===
- El candelabro de los siete brazos Psalmos ("The Seven Arm Candelabra: Psalmos"), 1914
- El divino fracaso ("The divine failure"), 1918
- España y los judíos españoles ("Spain and the Spanish Jews"), 1920
- Salomé en la literatura ("Salomé in literature"), 1920
- Ética y estética de los sexos ("Ethics and aesthetics of the sexes"), 1921
- Los valores eróticos en las religiones: El amor en el Cantar de los Cantares ("Erotic Values in Religions: Love in the Song of Songs"), 1930
- La Copla Andaluza ("La Copla Andaluza"), 1936
- Los judíos en Sefarad ("The Jews in Sepharad"), 1950
- Mahoma y el Korán ("Muhammad and the Koran"), 1954

=== Compilations ===
- Antología de poetas persas ("Anthology of Persian poets"),
- Bellezas del Talmud ("Beauties of the Talmud"), 1919

=== Novels ===
- La encantadora ("The lovely"), 1916
- El eterno milagro ("The eternal miracle"), 1918
- La madona del carrusel ("The Madonna of the Carousel"), 1920
- En la tierra florida ("In the flowery land"), 1920
- La huelga de los poetas ("The poets' strike"), 1921
- Las luminarias de Hanukah ("The Hanukah Luminaries"), 1924
