= Defence of the Idol =

1934 book by Omar Cáceres

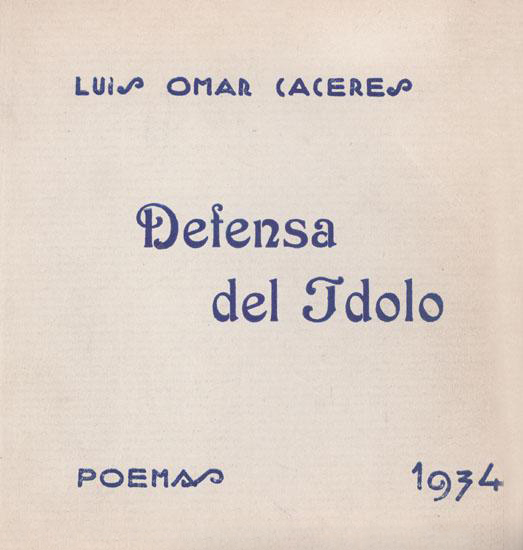
- Author: Luis Omar Cáceres
- Language: Spanish
- Genre: Poetry
- Published: 1934
- Publisher: Norma
- Publication place: Chile
- Pages: 53
- OCLC: 55336848

Defence of the Idol (Spanish: Defensa del ídolo) is the only book written by Chilean poet Omar Cáceres. It was originally published in Santiago by Norma publishing when Cáceres was thirty years old. Due to the numerous errors included in the first edition, the author decided to burn the majority of the copies of the book, keeping only the several books needed for his 1996 posthumous reprint, under the care of Pedro Lastra, through LOM Ediciones.

The collection, formed of fifteen short poems, had a strong impact among the writers of the time. The work is preceded by a prologue written by Vicente Huidobro, and is the only prologue to be written by the creationist poet in his lifetime. Nowadays, Defence of the Idol is considered one of the benchmarks of Latin American avant-garde writing in Chile.

== Publishing history ==
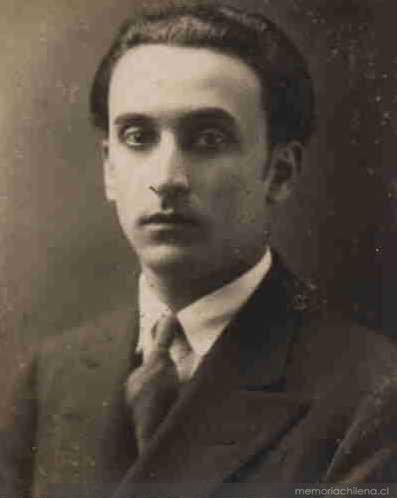
Omar Cáceres, author of Defence of the Idol.

According to researcher Manuel Peña Muñoz, Cáceres wrote this collection of poems at the Café Iris, a literary cafe located in the Undurraga Building in Santiago. The poems 'Insomnia at Dawn', together with the first and fifth parts of 'Angel of Silence', were included in the anthology Modern Chilean Poetry (1931), edited by Rubén Azócar as a preliminary to the collection being published.

For the first edition of his book, Cáceres initially relied on two proposals for the prologue, written by poets Ángel Cruchaga Santa María and Pablo de Rokha. As neither version was totally to the author's liking, he requested a third and final version from Vicente Huidobro, who had returned from France the previous year. This generated strong debate between Rokha and Huidobro, which was recorded in the newspaper La Opinión.

The book was published thanks to the financial support of his brother, Raúl Cáceres Aravena, and his modest income teaching Spanish at a high school. Once published, Cáceres realised that the first edition was full of errors. Enraged, he gathered all the copies he could and burned them in a bonfire in his courtyard. Only a small number of first edition copies were saved. Some possibly remained in the hands of friends, such as the poet Eduardo Anguita. His brother Raúl kept at least one copy, while only two are currently preserved in the National Library of Chile. According to research, there are no further copies in other public libraries in Chile. These few remaining copies allowed the posthumous reprinting of the collection, by the Chilean poet and essayist Pedro Lastra, who textually transcribed the work in 1959 (photocopiers were yet to exist.)

The first reissue took place in 1996, in the collection Between Seas by Chilean publishers LOM Ediciones. This seventy page reprint was prepared by Lastra, who included a graphic appendix and additional epilogues. That same year it was published in the Vita nuova series by the publishers Ediciones el Tucán de Virginia, in Mexico City, though only part of Lastra's additions were incorporated. In 1997, the book, including material from the first reissue, was published as part of the Editorial Fund series by Pequeña Venecia, a publishing house in Caracas, Venezuela.

The author died in 1943.

== Content ==
This collection is composed of the following poems:

1. 'Foaming Mansion'
2. 'Insomnia at Dawn'
3. 'Words to a Mirror'
4. 'Decoration In the Rain'
5. 'Night'
6. 'Opposite Anchors'
7. 'Angel Of Silence'
8. 'Inconstant Oracle'
9. 'Second Form'
10. 'Against the Night'
11. 'Uninhabited Blue'
12. 'Native Figure'
13. 'Song To A Fugitive'
14. 'Lighting of the Self'
15. 'Visiting Extremes'

In both the original edition published by Norma and the edition edited by Lastra for LOM Ediciones, the poems are preceded by a prologue by Vicente Huidobro. In Lastra's reissue, he includes diverse additional material after the poems:

- The only known, preserved prose text written by the author, entitled "I, old and new words" written as a poetic statement and testimonial to precede his selection of poems published in Anthology of New Chilean Poetry (1935).
- A 'Notes' section, where he refers briefly to his conservation of the syntactic peculiarities used by Cáceres, and to the small corrections made from the comparison between the original edition and the poems collected in the Anthology of New Chilean Poetry.
- A "graphical Appendix" which includes a photograph of the first edition cover, a drawing of the bust of Cáceres by Antonio R. Romera, included first in Andrés Sabella's article entitled, "Luis Omar Cáceres: the poet whose death shames justice" (published in Las Últimas Noticias, 6 September 1943 and then in the 5th issue of Hacia magazine); an excerpt from the article by Antonio Acevedo Hernández, entitled "Omar Cáceres has launched himself in supreme flight" (published in Las Últimas Noticias, 15 September 1943), which includes a blurred photograph of his face and the cover of the fifth issue of Towards magazine (September 1955), dedicated to the poet.
- Two epilogues: "Omar Cáceres returns" by Pedro Lastra, and "A ghostly poet" by Volodia Teitelboim, both of which refer to aspects of the author's personal life.

== Reception and impact ==
The first publication of this book generated controversy within the Chilean literary community of the time, due to the lawsuit mentioned above between Pablo de Rokha and Vicente Huidobro regarding the production of the book's prologue. However, this first edition could not be read by many, due to the aforementioned massive burning of the copies made by its author.

Despite being Cáceres's only book, the 1996 reissue was enough to be considered a benchmark within Chilean avant-garde poets. This collection of poems has motivated various studies by critics and scholars, as well as the respect and admiration of various writers, such as Chilean Andrés Sabella and Venezuelan Miguel Gomes.

== Style ==
The lyrical poetry of this work is framed within the Latin American avant-garde, with Freudian, Pantheistic y Jungian elements. Esoteric and metaphysical elements are also attributed to this collection; elements, that for Eduardo Anguita, links Cáceres to his contemporary, the writer Miguel Serrano.

It is considered a profound, questioning, lucid and refined work, with a constant exploratory attitude and a disintegration of the "poetic self".

== Analysis of the collection ==
In this collection, written in the later years of the author's youth, the writer Luis Merino Reyes (1912-2011) recognises a great love for life, which is expressed in intense and varied emotions.

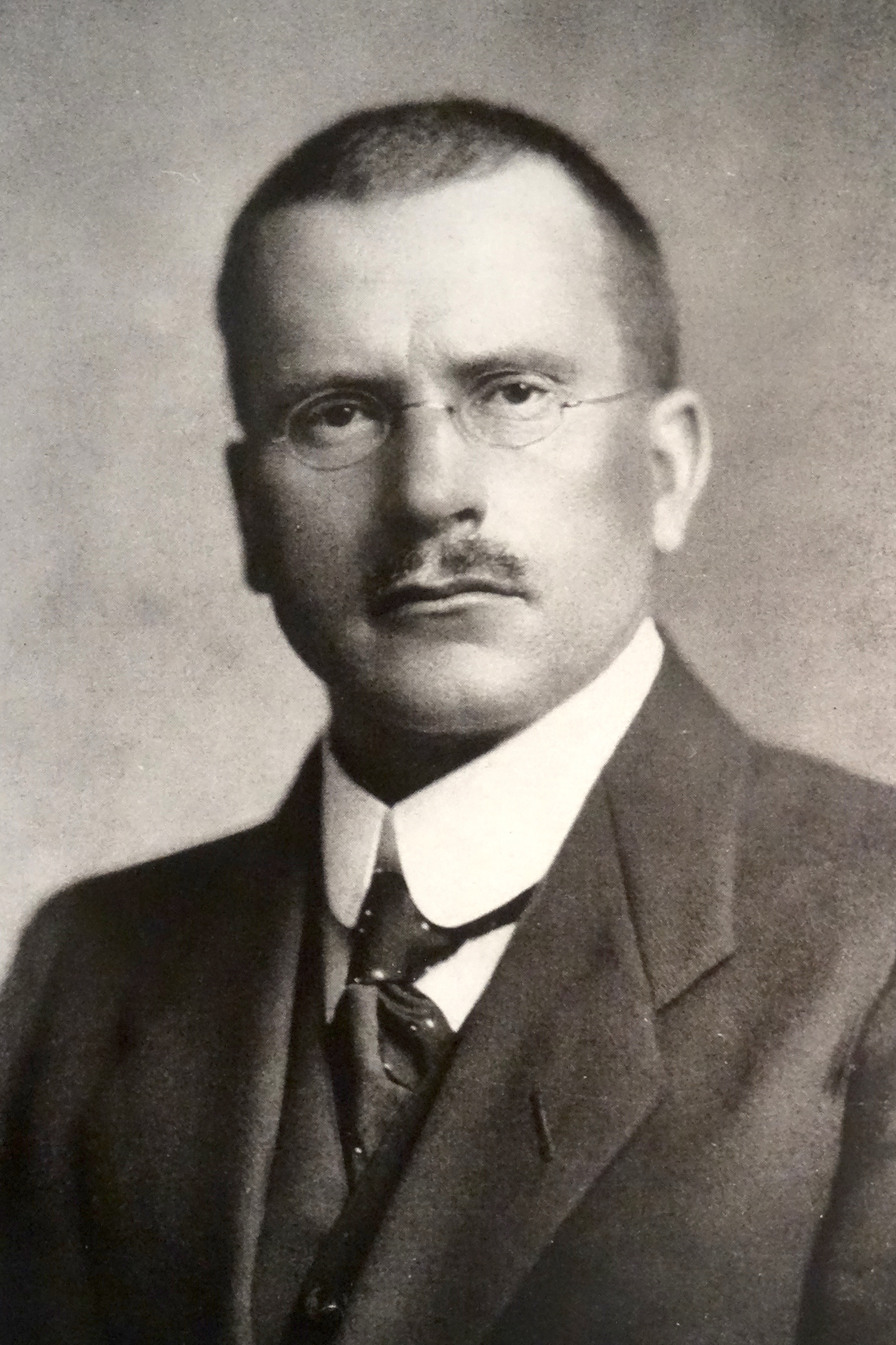
Carl Gustav Jung, founder of Analytical psychology. For the academic Miguel Gomes, Defence of the Idol can be interpreted as an initiation journey of the "poetic self" in "self" discovery, a central archetype of the collective unconscious.

For the writer and academic Miguel Gomes (b. 1964), the work uses a "militaristic" vocabulary; which is exemplified by the use of the word "defence" in the title of the book. Gomes argues that the enunciation of poems maintains a semi-narrative continuity and precise direction throughout all the poems. Any apparent deviations could be considered a catalytic component or means of generating suspense. According to this argument, the discourse of the whole work is constructed by the mythologem of "the search for the centre" or the "myth of the fall"; the idea that the "poetic self" is experienced as an evolution or initiation journey that consists of several stages: the plundering of the external, descent into the psyche, alteration of lucidity, recognition of authenticity, panic and uncertainty, loss of reason, reconstruction and encounter with the true self. This journey would correspond to the development of the phenomenon of Jungian synchronicity, in which the "poetic self" is disintegrated and transmuted (but in this case, it also transcends) throughout the different poems into a new image, that of the 'idol'. The 'idol' implicitly acts as the source of the lyric and in the Jungian sense would be the 'self' to whom the 'ego' is subordinate. For Gomes, Huidobro's description of this work in his prologue, fits perfectly with the principles of Jungian psychology.

More specifically, for Gomes, the title of the first poem, "Foaming Mansion", refers to the fragility of a space, which commences the book’s systematic rupture of our conceptions of the space-time of reality. For example, every trope of the second stanza breaks with the accustomed stability, stillness or uniqueness in presenting images of landscape, time, sky and the journey. The syntactic dis-articulation produced by the punctuation of each verse, produce a staccato rhythm that reinforces this breakdown of reality, in pursuit of the discovery of the unknown. A fact that is articulated more specifically towards the penultimate stanza, where the transition from "I" to the poetic voice itself is perceived, i.e. the "self", baptised in the last stanza as the "unknown idol". This enunciation is emphasised in the following poems. The radical introspection of the "poetic self" in this first poem is repeated in "Insomnia at Dawn", whose title superimposes psycho-physical states, time and space, and whose content, in the midst of deixis and displacement of meaning, takes the form of a prayer addressed to that "self", to break with the vigil of the "I". In the sonnet "Words to a Mirror", the "I" begins to explore its interior, with restrained tension, in search of its true "abyss". What in 'Foaming Mansion' was an intention to "unfold his words" on paper, here is an intention to unfold them in the mirror, which begins to insinuate a meta-linguistic plot that will become more evident in the successive poems. The journey towards the "inner abyss" becomes explicit towards the sixth poem, 'Opposing Anchors', where the speaker is placed in the same journey by the psychic route, in a centrifugal movement that alters time and space. In ‘Angel of Silence’, the "I" in transition experiences feelings already imperceptible by the senses, and in his introspection recognises the desired authenticity of the "self". In the following five poems, the story of the fall adopts the tone of the initiation voyage and the traveller begins to experience anguish, fear, horror, before the absolute loss of reason. Thus, for Gomes, "Inconstant Oracle" is a suffocating poem, with moments of mistrust and uncertainty for the journey undertaken. However, in ‘Second Form’ (connected with ‘Words to a Mirror’) and ‘Against the Night’, an attempt of consolation is observed, in opposition to the anguish and hope for a happy arrival. In ‘Uninhabited Blue’ lies the anguish of ‘Inconstant Oracle’, but in ‘Native Figure’, hopelessness and hope connect, in the process of rebuilding the subject from nothing. The final three poems constitute the celebration of arrival. ‘Song to the Fugitive’ acts as "apotheotic synthesis" of all the story told so far. This poem ends with capital letters, with hurried words and daring animosity, with the fusion of the first and second person, using these elements to emphasise the disintegration of appearances and time. The following poem, "Enlightenment of the Self", portrays the enclosures where the "idol" dwells, in which the conventional physics are altered or non-existent. Finally, in ‘Visiting Extremes’, the initial motivation of the trip is reiterated and the triumph of the avant-garde undertaking is manifested, along with the absence of time and external reality.

Eduardo Anguita agrees with Gomes regarding Cáceres’s interest in the mysteries of "self", and highlights his attempts to describe spectral figures and dreams using, among other resources, hyphens to forcibly divide words.

According to critic Marcelo Pellegrini, the reference in the poem "Opposing Anchors" to a car on the road is a clear avant-garde gesture, which shows an interest in these machines; an interest which was shared by very few of his contemporaries, with the notable exception of Vicente Huidobro. Huidobro himself also dedicated poems to motor vehicles. However, Pellegrini warns, what in Huidobro is a "childish enthusiasm", is in Cáceres an irony that brings him closer to another contemporary of his, the Portuguese Fernando Pessoa; whose work Cáceres was unaware of. Pellegrini relates the poem "Opposing Anchors" with "The wheel..." by Pessoa, which was published under his pen-name Álvaro de Campos.

== Bibliography ==
- This article is in part derived from «Omar Cáceres: Defensa del ídolo» from the portal Memoria Chilena, whose original content was published under the Licencia Creative Commons Atribución-CompartirIgual 3.0 Unported.
- Cáceres, Omar (October 1996). Defensa del ídolo (I ed.). Santiago de Chile: LOM Ediciones. ISBN 956-7369-88-7.
