= Omar Cáceres =

Chilean poet (1904–1943)

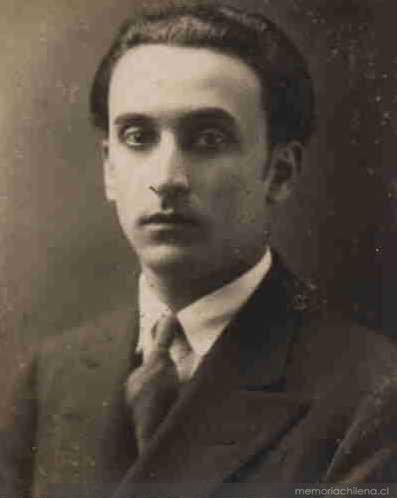
- Born: Luis Omar Cáceres Aravena; May 7, 1904 (age 122); Cauquenes, Chile
- Died: September 6, 1943; Renca, Chile
- Citizenship: Chilean
- Occupation: Poet
- Notable work: Defence of the Idol
- Political party: Communist Party of Chile

Luis Omar Cáceres Aravena (Cauquenes, July 5, 1904–Renca, c. September 6, 1943), (Note: While these are the most widely accepted dates of his birth and death, some sources also indicate he may have been born in 1905 or 1906, and that his date of death may have been in late August 1943.) better known as Omar Cáceres, was a Chilean poet whose mysterious life and death made him a paradigm of the "poète maudit".

His only book, Defensa del ídolo (1934), caused a great impact in its time, and contains the only prologue ever written by Vicente Huidobro. In 1996, the work was rescued by Pedro Lastra, from the few surviving copies of the first edition. This reissue allowed for greater access to his work. Cáceres is now considered one of the leading figures of Latin American vanguardism in Chile.

== Biography ==
=== Childhood and youth ===
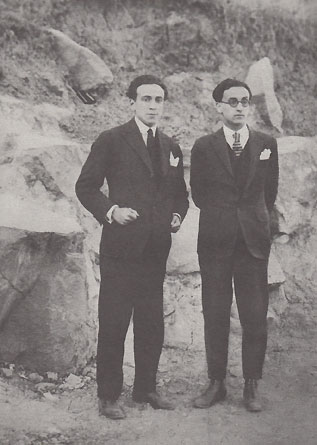
Omar Cáceres (left) with his cousin Alejandro, at Cerro San Cristóbal, Santiago, 1925

Cáceres was born in the commune of Cauquenes, in the Maule Region, central zone of Chile. He was the son of the elementary school teacher Cecilia Rosa Aravena Aravena, and of the normal school-trained teacher José Antonio Cáceres Cáceres, who died in the same town on February 8, 1904, a few months before his son's birth. He had at least one brother, Raúl Cáceres Aravena, who worked as a Spanish-language teacher at the Liceo de Viña del Mar.

He began his Law studies in 1922, which he ultimately left unfinished. Of a rather reserved personality, generally solitary and distant, he began to connect with Chile's artistic and poetic scene in the 1920s. He mixed with poets such as Pablo de Rokha and Ángel Cruchaga Santa María, and Miguel Serrano, and during his life had more indirect ties to other contemporary writers, such as Volodia Teitelboim, Eduardo Anguita, Andrés Sabella, or Gonzalo Rojas. Jorge Teillier would often recall him playing violin in an orchestra of blind musicians, even though he himself was not blind.

=== Literary career ===
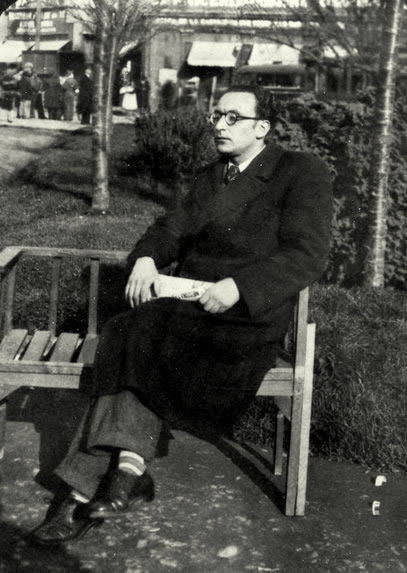
Omar Cáceres in San Antonio, 1926

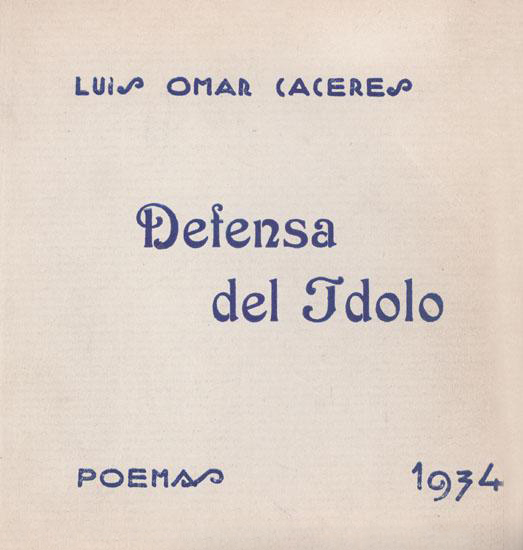
Original cover of Defensa del ídolo (1934), Cáceres's only known and published book.

In the early 1920s he began working in literary criticism, mainly for El Diario Ilustrado. In 1925 he moved to the port of San Antonio, where he worked as secretary to judge Eliodoro Astorquiza. Around those years he began to draw closer to the Communist Party of Chile, through which he became a pre-candidate for deputy. However, as a result of his political militancy, he lost his job in 1927 when the government of Carlos Ibáñez del Campo took office.

In 1931, while still an unpublished author, three of his poems were included in the anthology La poesía chilena moderna, edited by Rubén Azócar. His only book published in his lifetime was Defensa del ídolo, released in 1934 by the Norma publishing house in Santiago, thanks to the financial support the author received from his brother Raúl's modest income. The book, regarded as an exemplary case of Latin American vanguardism, includes the only prologue ever written by Vicente Huidobro, who had returned from France the previous year. Cáceres, enraged by the large number of misprints it contained, gathered up as many copies as he could and burned them in a bonfire. Of those, only a few copies survived, among them the ones now held at the National Library of Chile, which are the ones that made later reissues of the work possible. That same year, he founded the magazine Vital/Ombligo together with Huidobro and Eduardo Anguita. The following year, in 1935, he was included in the controversial anthology by Anguita and Teitelboim, Antología de poesía chilena nueva, in which he included a brief personal statement, titled "Yo, viejas y nuevas palabras." This is the only known surviving prose text by the author, although it is known that at some point he worked on a book of short stories and on a biography of his former employer, Eliodoro Astorquiza.

=== Death ===
During his final years, Cáceres stopped seeing most of the writers he had met in the 1930s. Posthumously, Anguita speculated that he may have fallen into madness, while Teitelboim suggested he may have immersed himself in hostile environments, disparagingly known as "lumpen."

In the first week of September 1943, under circumstances that remain unclear, his body was found in a rural ditch in the commune of Renca, in the northwestern sector of Santiago, with his head broken and his pockets empty. His body was identified at the Servicio Médico Legal (Legal Medical Institute) a week after it was found. Some claim it was a murder, while others believe Cáceres took his own life by jumping into the San Carlos Canal. News of his death moved several writers of the time. Andrés Sabella and Antonio Acevedo Hernández each dedicated an article to him, published in Las Últimas Noticias just days after the discovery of his death. Sabella went further, and in 1955 devoted the entire fifth issue of his magazine Hacia to him, which was then beginning its second period of existence, after twenty years of inactivity.

== Rediscovery of his work ==
In October 1996 the first reissue of Defensa del ídolo appeared, prepared by the poet Pedro Lastra, who edited it from the few copies that survived the bonfire and were preserved by the National Library of Chile. This first reissue by LOM Ediciones was followed by subsequent publications in Mexico and Venezuela.

In 2011, the National Library of Chile acquired a valuable collection of additional documents, including unpublished manuscripts, personal correspondence, and original photographs of the author. His small body of work has prompted studies and favorable commentary from various literary critics and researchers, such as the Chilean Andrés Sabella and the Venezuelan Miguel Gomes.

Chilean researcher María José Cabezas Corcione published, in 2014, the critical and biographical study Luis Omar Cáceres: El ídolo creacionista (Ediciones Lastarria), which includes the author's complete book, incorporating, among other materials, a discarded prologue by Pablo de Rokha.

== Style ==
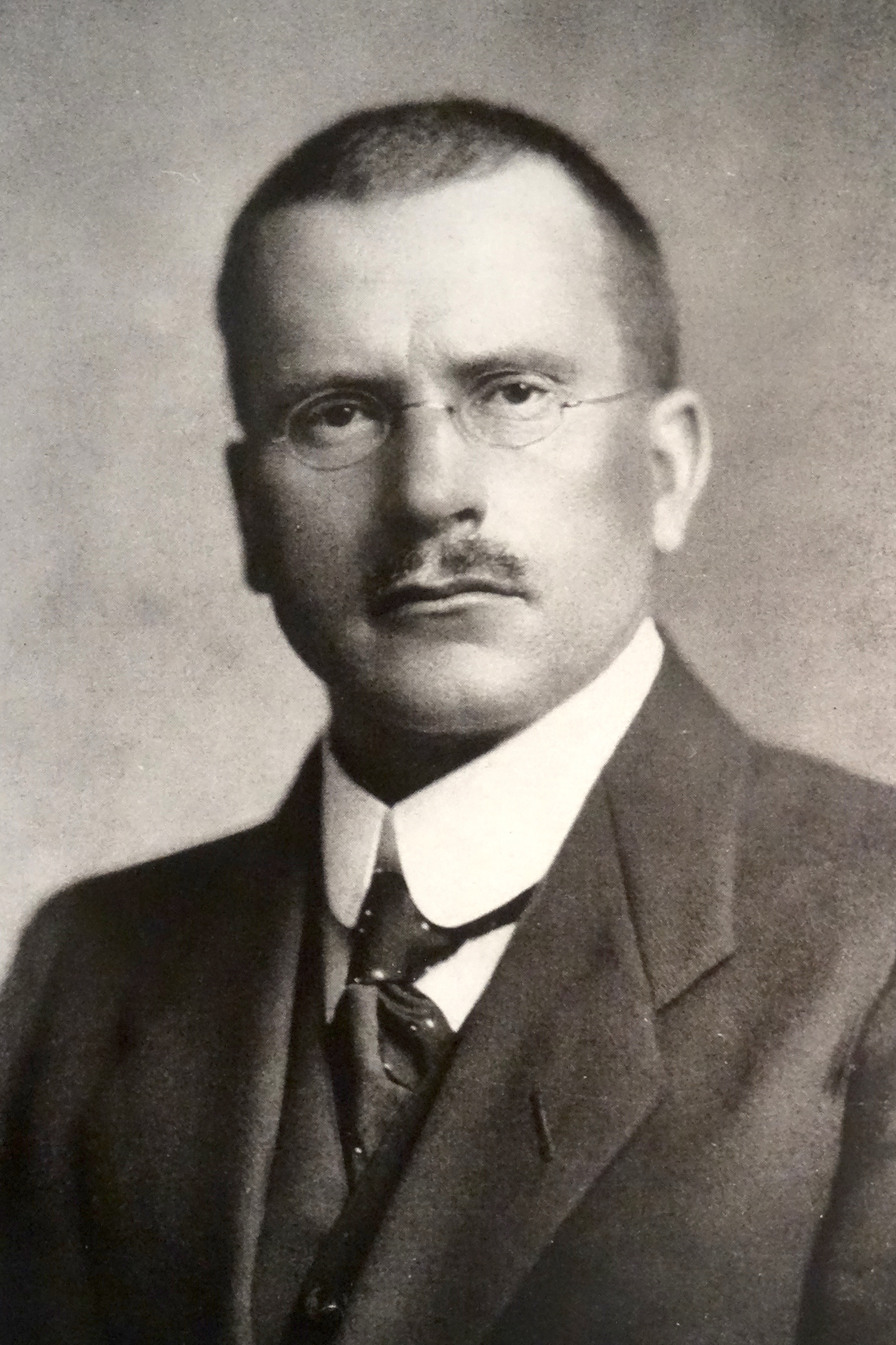
Carl Gustav Jung, founder of analytical psychology. Miguel Gomes has written extensively about the search, in Cáceres's poems, for the "Self," the central archetype of the collective unconscious.

According to general critical consensus, his work corresponds to his own personality: introspective and hermetic, profound, questioning, lucid, refined, and in a constant state of exploration.

Framed within Latin American vanguardism, his poems contain esoteric, Freudian, and pantheistic elements, along with violence, dehumanization, and the disintegration of the "poetic I." Indeed, rather than a search for the "I," associated with the ego, Cáceres sought to point instead to the "Self," in a Jungian sense, to which the former is subordinate.

== Works ==
=== Poetry ===
- 1934: Defensa del ídolo

=== In anthologies ===
- 1931: La poesía chilena moderna (ed. Rubén Azócar)
- 1935: Antología de poesía chilena nueva (ed. Eduardo Anguita and Volodia Teitelboim)

=== In magazines ===
- 1955: Hacia (no. 5, September; ed. Andrés Sabella) (Note: The 300-copy edition includes the text "Evocación de Omar Cáceres," by Luis Merino Reyes, as well as Cáceres's poems "Insomnio junto al alba," "Palabras a un espejo," "Contra la noche," "Ángel de silencio," "Decoración de la lluvia," and "Oráculo inconstante.")

=== About the author ===
- Acevedo Hernández, Antonio (September 15, 1943). "Omar Cáceres se ha lanzado en el vuelo supremo" [Omar Cáceres has embarked on his final journey]. Las Últimas Noticias (in Spanish).
- Anguita, Eduardo (March 13, 1973). "Revelación de Omar Cáceres" [Omar Cáceres' Revelation]. Plan (in Spanish) (94). Santiago de Chile: 18.

Later included in: Anguita, Eduardo (2000). Zegers B., Pedro Pablo (ed.). Páginas de la memoria [Pages from the Memory] (in Spanish). Ediciones DIBAM. OCLC 46658761.

- Cabezas Corcione, María José (2014). Luis Omar Cáceres: El ídolo creacionista [Luis Omar Cáceres: The Creationist Idol] (in Spanish). Santiago de Chile: Ediciones Lastarria. OCLC 906807473. Archived from the original on November 19, 2016.
- Gomes, Miguel (1997). "El viaje interior de la vanguardia: Defensa del ídolo de Omar Cáceres" [The Avant-Garde's Inner Journey: “Defensa del ídolo” by Omar Cáceres]. Mapocho (in Spanish) (41).
- Lastra, Pedro (October 1996). "Regresos de Omar Cáceres" [Omar Cáceres' Returns]. Defensa del ídolo (in Spanish): 61–64.
- Merino Reyes, Luis (1955). "Evocación de Omar Cáceres" [In Memory of Omar Cáceres]. Hacia (in Spanish) (5).
- Merino Reyes, Luis (January 25, 1998). "Un poeta trágico: Omar Cáceres" [A Tragic Poet: Omar Cáceres]. La Discusión (in Spanish): 2.
- Morales, Andrés; Cabezas Corcione, María José (2009). Omar Cáceres: el vanguardismo secreto y olvidado [Omar Cáceres: The Secret and Forgotten Avant-Garde] (in Spanish). Programa Cybertesis. OCLC 809893830.
- Naranjo Igartiburu, Manuel (October 22, 2013). "Defensa del ídolo de Omar Cáceres: una reactualización de la mística negativa" [“Defensa del ídolo” by Omar Cáceres: A Reinterpretation of Negative Mysticism]. La calle Passy 061 (in Spanish).
- Pellegrini, Marcelo (March 23, 1997). "La dispersión del yo" [The Dispersion of the Self]. El Mercurio de Valparaíso (in Spanish): C9.
- Poo, Ximena (October 10, 1996). "Reencuentro con un poeta perdido" [Reunion with a Lost Poet]. La Época (in Spanish): 30.
- Pueyes Zúñiga, Víctor (September 20, 1995). "Rescate de un iluminado" [Rescue of an Enlightened One]. La Nación (in Spanish): 28–29.
- Sabella, Andrés (September 6, 1943). "Luis Omas Cáceres, el poeta cuya muerte avergüenza a la justicia" [Luis Omas Cáceres, the poet whose death is a disgrace to the justice system]. Las Últimas Noticias (in Spanish).
- Serrano, Miguel (1950). Ni por mar ni por tierra: Historia de una generación [Neither by Sea Nor by Land: The Story of a Generation] (in Spanish). Santiago de Chile: Nascimento. OCLC 13044673.
- Teitelboim, Volodia (October 1996). "Un poeta fantasmal" [A Ghostly Poet]. Defensa del ídolo (in Spanish): 65–68.

== Bibliography ==
- "Omar Cáceres (1904-1943)". Memoria Chilena.
- Cáceres, Omar (October 1996). Defensa del ídolo (in Spanish) (1st ed.). Santiago de Chile: LOM Ediciones. ISBN 956-7369-88-7.
