= Carlos Sotomayor =

Chilean painter

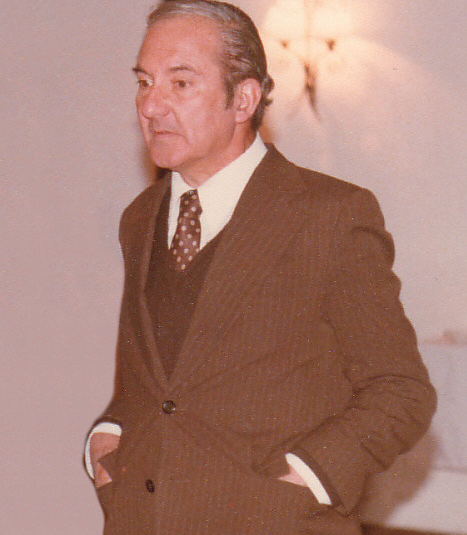
Carlos Sotomayor Román

Carlos Sotomayor Román (1911–1988) was a Chilean painter, born in La Serena, Chile. He is considered to be one of the principal exponents of the cubism from South America.

== Early years ==
His father, Carlos Sotomayor Cáceres was a Civil Engineer who worked for the Chilean Railway Company (Empresa de los Ferrocarriles del Estado), married to Julia Román Morales. They had 5 children: Carlos, Julio (poet), Lucía, Inés (agronomist) and Elena.

In his teenage years, Carlos Sotomayor met the painter and sculptor Laura Rodig, who had just come back from Europe, and worked with her, putting up an exhibition together with Pedro Olmos.

He studied at the Instituto Nacional in Santiago and in 1931 he studied at the School of Architecture of the Universidad de Chile. However, in 1932 he opted to study at the Fine Arts College of the same university instead. Some of his teachers were Jorge Caballero, Herman Gazmuri and Augusto Eguiluz.

== Work ==
An artwork example

His first formal exhibition took place in September 1933 at the Libreria Walton, a centre of cultural events. This event was sponsored and introduced by the poet Vicente Huidobro, with whom Carlos Sotomayor shared a close friendship.

In 1934 Sotomayor joined the Grupo Decembrista, together with María Valencia, Gabriela Rivanedeira, Jaime Dvar and Waldo Parraguez. This group of neocubist artists was led by Vicente Huidobro. Two years later, Carlos Sotomayor married Franka Serka Jurac, fellow student at the Fine Arts College.

In 1938 he joined the Grupo Rectángulo de Arte Moderno, encouraged by the artist Vergara Grez. He exhibited at the Alianza de Intelectuales de Chile together with María Valencia, Waldo Parraguez and Haroldo Donoso.

In August 1944 he exhibited 20 paintings at the Sala del Ministerio de Educación. In the catalogue there were articles and poems by the poets Eduardo Anguita and Julio Molina. The critic Antonio Romera wrote a very complimentary review in the press.

In 1946 Sotomayor exhibited several oil paintings and drawings at the Sala del Ministerio de Educacion. The writer Andres Sabella wrote an article about it.

In December 1952 Sotomayor exhibited at the Sala Pro Arte and in 1953 he took part in the Primer Salon de Primavera de la Casa de la Cultura de Nunoa, together with 50 other artists: José Balmes, Sergio Montecinos, Raul Santelices and José Venturelli among them.

In 1955 he started working at the Chilean Railway Company (EFE) as a draughtsman in the Department of Vias & Obras.

In 1960 Sotomayor took part in La Segunda Feria de Artes Plasticas (Parque Forestal) organised by the Museo de Arte Contemporáneo. Sotomayor won second prize.

Sotomayor exhibited his works at the Exposicion de Pintura Chilena Nueva in March 1962, organised and sponsored by Empresa Esso Oil Co. Nemesio Antúnez and José Balmes also participated.

In November 1966 Sotomayor exhibited his oil paintings at the Sala del Instituto de Artes Plasticas de la Universidad de Chile.

His last exhibition while he was alive, took place in 1979 at the Galeria Eco, where there were 30 of his paintings, among them: The painter and his models, Rape 1 and Landscapes of Cartagena. The art critic José María Palacios praised Sotomayor’s works in the press.

In 1973 Sotomayor retired from the railway company and devoted himself entirely to his paintings until his death. In 1984 he travelled to Europe where he visited museums of modern art in Paris, London, Birmingham and Rome.

In 1988 he suffered a heart attack from which he did not recover and died on 17 April.

In the year 2004, an exhibition of his paintings was organized at the Cultural Corporation of Las Condes, so called "Carlos Sotomayor: A modern classic"

== A Unique Figure in Chilean Painting (by J. Palacios) ==
A retired employee of the Chilean Railways, quiet, with a distant air, most people would not suspect that he is an artist, particularly a modern one. However, this unassuming artist inspired the critic Antonio Romera to write about him: 'Perhaps, in the entire history of Chilean painting, there isn't a clearer example of dedication to artistic creativity for its own sake.' And it would be difficult to find a more fitting observation.

Even as a teenager he displayed an innovative vision. At 14, he took part in a poster competition for the Spring Festival, encouraged by his father. An excellent draughtsman, with a line capable of expressing both the graceful and the vigorous in the classical tradition, Carlos Sotomayor could have worked entirely figuratively, an approach which would have brought him instant commercial success. With his mastery of line, he could also have diversified into printmaking, but his instinct was for painting. As a result, in 1934 he joined the Grupo Decembrista, a neocubist group led by the poet Vicente Huidobro, one of his most fervent admirers, who revealed his enthusiasm for Sotomayor's work in the magazine PRO published in the same year.

The writers of the avant-garde were the first to recognise Sotomayor's talent. E. Anguita, who won the 1988 Writer of the Year Award, Julio Molina and Guillermo Atías were among his greatest apologists, praising him as a painter who did not confine his work to the replication of reality, or to conventional romanticism. Supported by the solid foundation of his drawings, Sotomayor alters reality in order to render it more real, in the quest for more sensitive communication through highly personal, expressive forms. He is both violent and tender at the same time.

He remains an enigma, a solitary figure, praised by a few and still unknown to the majority. He doesn't win official accolades, nor do they hold any interest for him. Quiet, retiring, conversing only with his friends, the artist is not afraid of confronting his own solutions. Sensitive to current events, the initial figuration suddenly emerges in his work, but not as a final phase of his expression, only as the rebelliousness of a pure spirit. It is for this reason that, although efforts have been made to pigeonhole it, Sotomayor's work admits no labels. Picasso may be in the background, but it is because he admires in him, above all, his creative independence. The poet E. Anguita goes as far as saying that Sotomayor's painting is like the image of a "restless idea", a definition which the critic Romera elaborates on, underlying it as "a certain restlessness or agitation of the spirit.'.
