= Generation of '38 =

The Generation of '38 (Spanish: Generación del 38) was Chilean artistic-literary movement that tried to portray the social decline of the time in its works. It became prominent in the cultural panorama of the 1930s.

== Historical context ==
In 1937, after two mandates by Arturo Alessandri Palma, the Popular Front took over the Chilean government. The international situation was critical, marked by the Spanish Civil War (1936–1939) and by the imminent outbreak of World War II (1939–1945). This affected conditions for the majority of the population.

== Economic context ==
Chile was undergoing a process of economic transition, as its main source of livelihood was the agricultural sector, but interest in industrialization was growing. This had dire consequences for the mining sector, as production of saltpeter ceased, and consequently many unemployed northern miners decided to travel to the capital in search of new job opportunities.

== Characteristics of the group ==
Due to the great social turmoil resulting from the global crisis, some young Chilean writers felt the need to reflect what they saw around them in their works. In particular they detailed the deplorable conditions in which miners and laborers worked, and how this situation extended to their families – because the jobs paid poorly, scarcity and misery were common in daily life.

Facing this great social problem, various writers and artists wanted to bring literature and the arts closer to the reality of the Chilean working and middle classes. In the Generation of '38, interest in social issues was united with the idea of creating an intellectual and artistic movement. This contrasted with earlier years in which culture was not a transcendent part of Chilean social life because literature and other forms of art did not reflect the reality of life in the country.

The Generation of '38 was not only a literary movement, but also extended to other areas of culture. During the 1940s the experimental theater of the University of Chile and the Symphony Orchestra were created. In this way, both theater and music ensured that interest in the social question transcended the literary sphere and became a relevant theme for Chilean culture of the time.

An example of the themes that were addressed in the literature of the time is the narrative of Nicomedes Guzmán (1914–1964) in his work Los hombres oscuros, where he alludes to the vicissitudes of a man living in a tenement and how he decides to become part of a trade union movement. The type of literature that Guzmán created was that of a "pamphleteer" character, since in his works there was an implicit call to workers to mobilize and organize themselves to promote awareness of their problems and jointly seek certain improvements.

Another author who was interested in social problems was Volodia Teitelboim (1916–2008), whose works portrayed how capitalism affects the poor conditions in which poor and middle class Chileans live. This is how she referred to the birth of the Generation of '38:

The novice writers put something of our soul into that fight and we feel part of the populace. We were driven by a passionate and vague eagerness to change the national life, to give the worker and the peasant and also the writer and the artist a place of dignity under the sun, to create an atmosphere where poetry would occupy a golden chair in the proscenium. We wanted to impose scales of values in which intelligence, the spirit of sacrifice for beauty, the people and the country would replace the rotten government of the opulent, spiritually exhausted, uneducated, mediocre and empty.

The novelist Carlos Droguett (1912–1996) tells in one of his chronicles of the deaths of some young people who participated in a protest in the Seguro Obrero building in 1938. In his 1966 autobiography he affirmed: "Seguro Obrero shook me deeply and made me aware of my capacity to hate."

In short, many of the works created by writers belonging to the Generation of '38 were tools to express their discontent with the working conditions and misery experienced by most Chileans.

== Exponents ==
- Gonzalo Drago (1906–1994)
- Mario Bahamonde Silva (1910–1979)
- Francisco Coloane (1910–2002)
- Maité Allamand (1911–1996)
- Mila Oyarzún (1912-1982)
- Andrés Sabella (1912–1989)
- Carlos Droguett (1912–1996)
- Stella Corvalán (1913–1994)
- María Elvira Piwonka (1913-2006)
- Nicomedes Guzmán (1914–1964)
- Teófilo Cid (1914–1964)
- Eduardo Anguita (1914–1992)
- Volodia Teitelboim (1916–2008)
- Miguel Serrano (1917–2009)
- Gonzalo Rojas (1917–2011)
