= Mila Oyarzún =

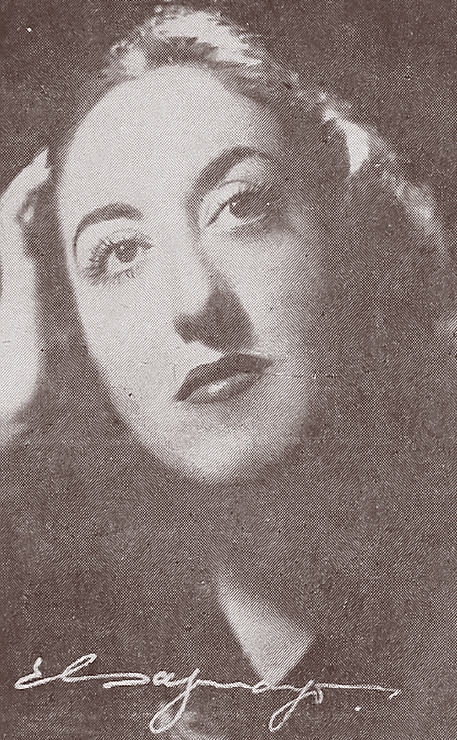
Mila Oyarzún (1941)

Emilia Pincheira "Mila" Oyarzún (1912 – October 9, 1982) was a Chilean writer, poet and human rights activist who wrote poetry and novels. She is included together with Homero Arce, María Elvira Piwonka, Stella Corvalán, and others in the group of writers known as the Generation of '38. Oyarzún was a recipient of the Municipal Poetry Prize of Santiago.

Oyarzún was born in Concepción, Chile, and died in Santiago.

== Career ==
One of her first published literary works was the poetry collection Esquinas del viento through Editorial Nascimento (1941). It received the Premio Municipal de Poesía de Santiago (Municipal Poetry Prize of Santiago). Along with that of María Monvel, Chela Reyes, Sylvia Moore, Gladys Thein, María Elvira Piwonka, and Irma Astorga, her literary work is included within the so-called “new poetry” of Chile in the late 1950s.

She held a managerial position in the Fuego de Poesía Group (founded in 1955) along with several other writers such as José Miguel Vicuña, María Silva Ossa, Carlos René Correa, Eliana Navarro, Francisca Ossandón, and Chela Reyes, among others.

In the area of human rights defense in Chile, she was one of the founders of the Chilean Human Rights Commission in 1978, together with the trade unionist Clotario Blest and the lawyers Máximo Pacheco and Jaime Castillo Velasco.

== Awards ==
- Premio Municipal de Poesía de Santiago

== Works ==
- Esquinas del viento (Santiago: Nascimento, 1941)
- Estancias de soledad (Santiago: Ed. Tegualda, 1946)
- Cartas a una sombra (novela, Santiago: 1944)
- Pausado cielo (Santiago: Acanto, 1954)
- Mediodía (Santiago: Ed. Universitaria, 1958)
