= Enrique Lihn =

Chilean poet, playwright, and novelist

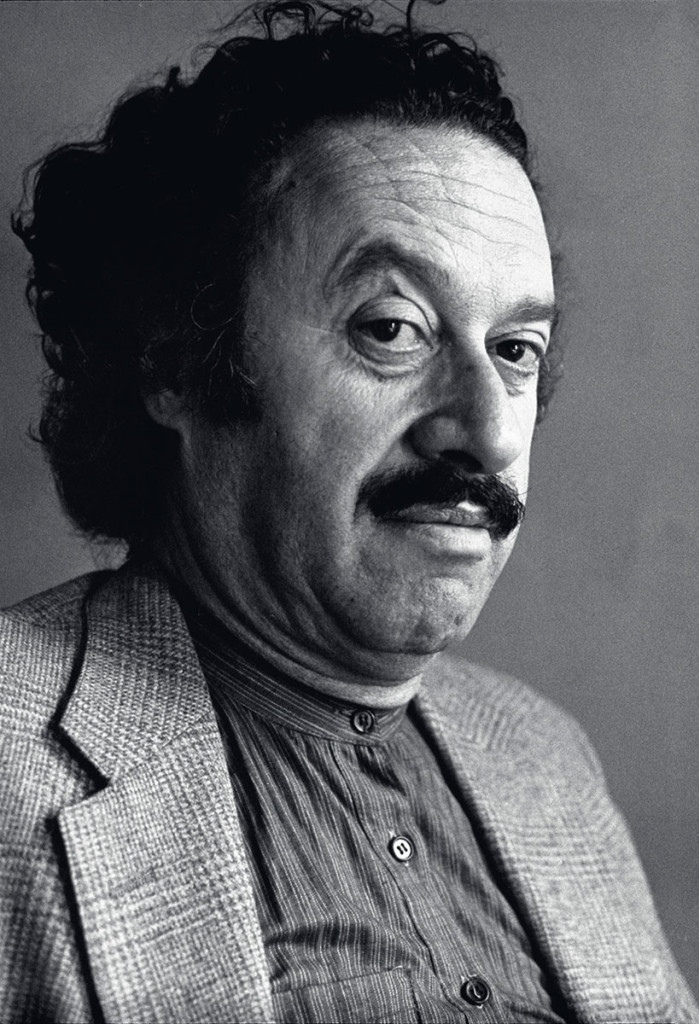
A black-and-white portrait of Enrique Lihn in the 1970s

Enrique Lihn Carrasco (3 September 1929 – 10 July 1988) was a Chilean writer, literary critic, and cartoonist, mostly known as a poet, but who also wrote essays, short stories, novels, plays, and comic books.

== Biography ==
=== Early life ===
Son of Enrique Lihn Doll and María Carrasco Délano, Enrique Lihn completed his primary education at Saint George's College and later attended Santiago's Liceo Alemán. Lihn displayed an early aptitude for reading and was well-versed in Spanish, French, Anglo-Saxon, and Latin American poetry from a young age. In 1942, at the age of thirteen, he enrolled in the School of Fine Arts at the University of Chile, initially intending to study visual arts.

Although Lihn initially pursued painting at the university, he ultimately decided to embark on a writing career. Between 1949 and 1955, he published his first two poetry books and penned an essay on the work of Nicanor Parra. In collaboration with Nicanor Parra, Alejandro Jodorowsky, Jorge Sanhueza, Jorge Berti, Roberto Humeres, and Luis Oyarzún, Lihn created Quebrantahuesos, a collage published in 1952.

Lihn parted ways with mime artist and dancer Ivette Mingram when their daughter Andrea, who would later become an actress, was a year and a half old.

In 1963, Lihn published La pieza oscura (The Dark Room), a poetry collection he considered to be his first significant work. This book was subsequently translated into French as La chambre noire and published in Paris (Pierre Jean Oswald Editeur, 1972) as a bilingual edition, featuring cover art and illustrations by Roberto Matta.

Lihn was an active member of the Popular Action Front in Chile and showed his support for Salvador Allende during the presidential elections of 1958 and 1964.

=== Trips overseas and stay in Cuba ===
In 1965, at the age of thirty-five, Lihn was awarded a UNESCO scholarship to study museology in various European cities, including Paris. This marked his first trip abroad, an experience that held great significance for the author. Although he lost the notebook he kept during the journey, its impact was captured in his work Poesía de paso, which won the Casa de las Américas Prize in 1966.

During the latter half of the 1960s, Lihn resided in Havana for two years. In Cuba, he engaged in diverse activities, working at Casa de las Américas, writing for the Granma newspaper, composing art catalogs, and editing an anthology of Vicente Huidobro's works. He also fell in love and married a mulata, forming close friendships with notable individuals such as Roque Dalton and Heberto Padilla. Lihn fully immersed himself in Latin American literature and, most importantly, gained firsthand experience of the revolution. However, over time, he became disillusioned.

Upon his return to Chile in the late 1960s, Lihn's affection for Cuba began to wane, mirroring the tension he had witnessed in the country. This strain found expression in the two poetry collections he published in 1969: Escrito en Cuba and La musiquilla de las pobres esferas. The culmination of this change occurred in 1970 when he definitively distanced himself from Cuba due to the accusation of treason against his friend Padilla. Lihn publicly defended Padilla, an act that sealed his permanent separation from the island. Consequently, the Chilean poet became an "uncomfortable author for Cuba," as remarked by Germán Marín, or, in Lihn's own words, a "citizen under suspicion." It was not until almost thirty years later, in 2009, within the framework of the editions of books by Chilean authors published by Casa de las Américas for the Havana International Book Fair—where Chile was the guest of honor—that an anthology of Lihn's work titled Una voz parecida al contrario was finally published.

=== Return to Chile ===
With writer Germán Marín, Lihn co-founded the Cormorán magazine of Editorial Universitaria, which released eight issues between August 1969 and December 1970.

From 1970 to 1973, Lihn directed the poetry workshop at the Catholic University of Chile. He also served as a research professor of literature at the Center for Humanistic Studies, led by Cristián Huneeus, at the Faculty of Physical and Mathematical Sciences of the University of Chile starting in 1972. During this period, he crossed paths with other cultural figures of the time, including poet and art theorist Ronald Kay. In the magazine Manuscritos, Kay highlighted the Quebrantahuesos, poetry murals created by Nicanor Parra, Alejandro Jodorowsky, and Lihn using the collage technique.

In 1973, Lihn published his novel Batman en Chile in Argentina, but due to its release coinciding with the coup d'état in Chile, it was not distributed within the country.

Two years later, Lihn traveled to France as a guest of the French government. He made a one-month stop in New York, marking his first visit to the United States. During this time, he stayed at Pedro Lastra's house, where he met Óscar Hahn and Jaime Giordano. Lihn also gave readings at several universities, including Yale, Rutgers, Maryland, Stony Brook, The City University of New York, and the Center of Inter-American Relations. While in France, he wrote París, situación irregular, which was published in Chile in 1977.

In 1976, Lihn published his novel La orquesta de cristal through Editorial Sudamericana, with Héctor Libertella as the editor. In 1980, his third extensive narrative work, El arte de la palabra, was published in Spain. Both of these works feature Gerardo de Pompier (the author's alter ego) and Roberto Albornoz as protagonists and narrators.

In 1978, Lihn received the Guggenheim Fellowship, which brought him to New York for a few months. His poetry collection A partir de Manhattan was published in Chile in 1979. He subsequently made several visits to the United States as a visiting professor at various universities.

Lihn's creative pursuits extended to writing and staging plays, such as La radio and Las gallinas, as well as performances. In 1984, he presented the happening Adiós Tarzán, a parody of the dictatorship. His recital of the poem El Paseo Ahumada on the eponymous street in downtown Santiago led to a brief arrest by the police in 1983. Many of these works, including La aparición de la Virgen, a booklet featuring texts and drawings by Lihn himself, were self-financed by the poet and his friends in an attempt to counter the stifling official culture of the military dictatorship era in Chile.

In addition to the illustrations he created for La aparición de la Virgen, Lihn worked on an unfinished comic titled Roma, la loba. He also provided illustrations for other books, including Barlovento's 1949 edition of María Carolina Geel's novel Soñaba y amaba el adolescente Perces.

=== Final years and posthumous recognition ===
Lihn died in Santiago, Chile, on 10 July 1988, after battling cancer. Throughout his final moments, he remained devoted to his craft, continuing to write until the end. In accordance with his wishes, his friends Pedro Lastra and Adriana Valdés published his book Diario de muerte (1989), meticulously gathering, transcribing, and arranging the poems he had left behind. Lihn had personally selected the title, which he had written in the notebook where he had collected these poems.

His final resting place is located in the Parque del Recuerdo Cemetery, Sector D09, in Santiago, Chile, near the burial site of his dear friend, the poet Stella Díaz Varín. Following his passing, numerous anthologies and previously unpublished works from his extensive body of work were released.

Jorge Edwards, the novelist, drew inspiration from Lihn's remarkable persona to craft the protagonist in his novel La casa de Dostoievsky (Dostoievsky's House).

Additionally, the Chilean cartoonist Liván (Iván Cornejo) created a comic based on Lihn's work El Paseo Ahumada, which was published by the editorial Das Kapital in 2014.

== Style and influences ==
In his poetry, Lihn favored verses that leaned towards poetic prose rather than extreme lyricism, showcasing a clear influence from Nicanor Parra's work.

Literary critic Juan Manuel Vial noted that Lihn pioneered a style characterized by a fusion of "lyricism, everyday speech, essay, news, artistic appreciations, antipoetry, and emotions," which he initiated with his collection Poesía de paso (1966).

Lihn frequently explored the theme of a painful childhood, an aspect already evident in his work La pieza oscura (1963). Another significant recurring theme in his poetry is travel, which he introduced in Poesía de paso and further explored in works such as Escrito en Cuba (1969), París, situación irregular (1977), A partir de Manhattan (1979), and Estación de los desamparados (1982).

In addition to poetry, Lihn delved into short story writing and novels. His trilogy focusing on power, language, and "sociosis"—comprising Batman en Chile, La orquesta de cristal, and El arte de la palabra—though not widely acclaimed by national critics, positioned him as part of a movement that broke away from the literary boom, embracing experimental and transgressive Latin American narrative in the 1970s and 1980s. Essayist Héctor Libertella remarked that Lihn's work belonged to a group of "cavemen" who challenged the market-driven strategies and public personas of esteemed authors, contributing to the renewal of continental literature. Lihn's narrative style has been likened to the works of Reinaldo Arenas, Severo Sarduy, Manuel Puig, Salvador Elizondo, and Osvaldo Lamborghini.

Among Lihn's influences, the poet Henri Michaux holds a prominent place. Lihn encountered Michaux's work during his visit to Paris in 1965 and discovered several biographical connections they shared.

== Notable works ==
=== Poems ===
- "The Dark Room"
- "Cemetery in Punta Arenas"
- "Six Poems of Loneliness"
- "Torture Chamber"
- '"Of All Despondencies"
- "A Favourite Little Shrine"
- "Goodnight, Achilles"

=== Film ===
- Adiós a Tarzán, directed by Enrique Lihn & Pedro Pablo Celedón.

=== Novels ===
- Batman in Chile
- The Crystal Orchestra
- The Art of the Word

=== Works in English ===
- The Dark Room and Other Poems, transl. by Jonathan Cohen, John Felstiner, and David Unger, 1978, New Directions
- Figures of Speech, transl. by Dave Oliphant, 1999, Host Publications, Inc.
