= Digital National Library of Chile =

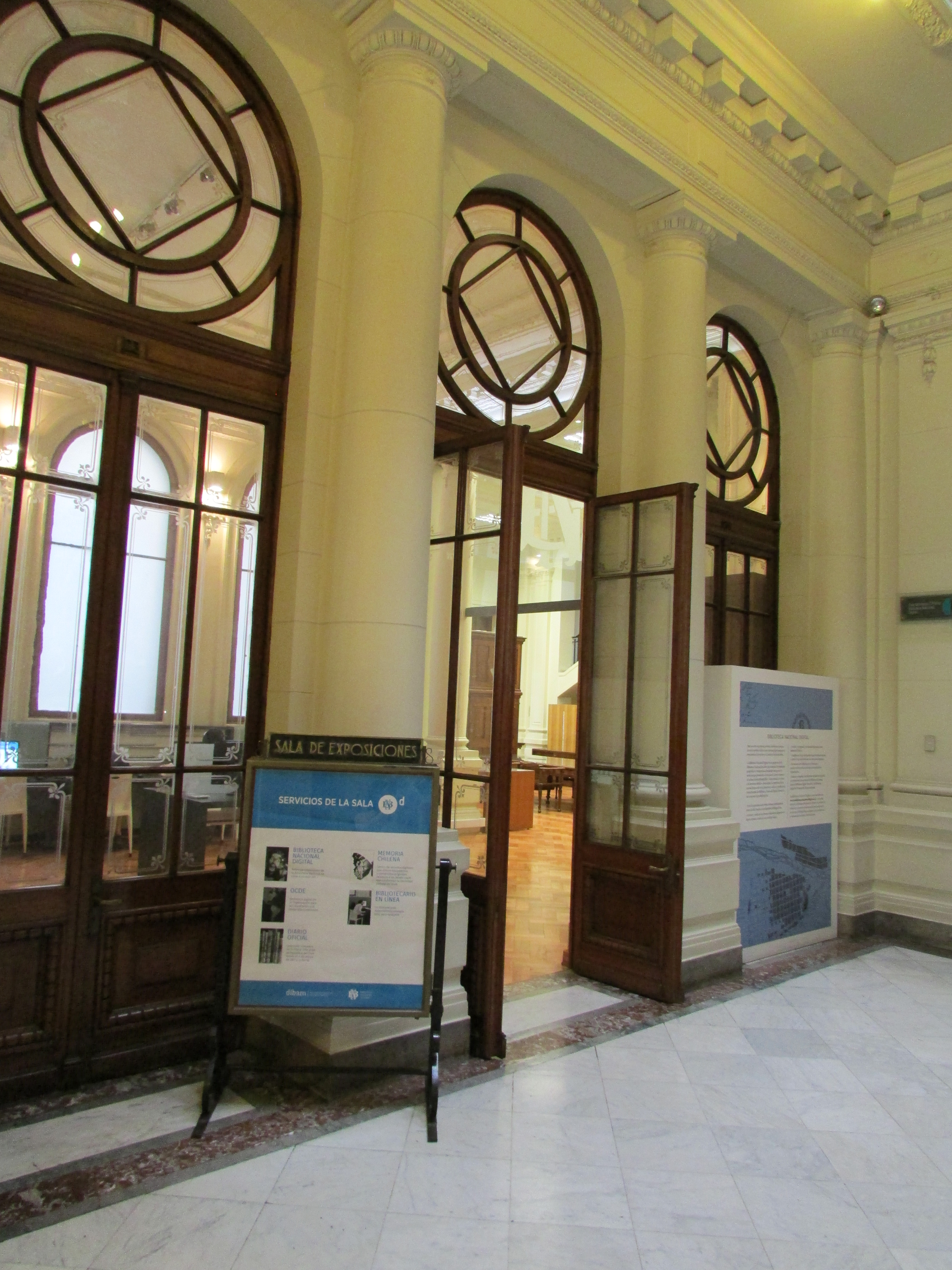
Access room to the National Digital Library, in the Alameda Hall, inside the National Library of Chile

The Digital National Library of Chile is a platform created by the National Library of Chile on August 19, 2013, on the occasion of the bicentennial of the National Library and seeks to "collect, preserve and disseminate" the information, knowledge, and intellectual production created in Chile in digital support, through the legal deposit law, allowing the integration of the digital services of the National Library, generating a transfer between users who consult analog collections to the digital consultation of the collections, without geographical or temporal limits.

== History ==
The Digital National Library was inaugurated on August 19, 2013, during the presidency of Sebastián Piñera, under the direction of the director of the Dibam, Magdalena Krebs and the director of the National Library of Chile, Ana Tironi.

By November 2014, it already had 80,000 titles, photos, videos, and articles online, and aimed to digitize 167,000 documents.

On August 19, 2015, the "Chilean Web Archive" website was launched, a "service whose objective is to store and preserve various national websites with the purpose of ensuring the availability of information and knowledge generated in digital format, in case of its eventual disappearance".

== Sections ==
The Digital National Library is composed of four sections:

- Memoria Chilena
- Electronic Deposit
- Online Librarian
- Virtual Visits

== Access points ==
Access points
Region	City	Location	Inauguration Date
Antofagasta	Antofagasta	Antofagasta Regional Library	November 14, 2013
Atacama	Copiapó	Atacama Regional Library	October 8, 2014
Coquimbo	La Serena	Gabriela Mistral Regional Library	June 28, 2018
Valparaíso	Rapa Nui	William Mulloy Library	August 7, 2014
Valparaíso	Valparaíso	Santiago Severín Library	May 29, 2014
Santiago	Santiago	National Library of Chile	August 19, 2013
Los Lagos	Puerto Montt	Los Lagos Regional Library	November 25, 2014
Aysén	Coyhaique	Aysén Regional Library	November 26, 2014

== Statistics ==
During the year 2014, for the period between January and December, the Digital National Library received 66,820 visits made by some 52,324 users.

== See also ==
- National Library of Chile
- Memoria Chilena
