= Adriana Valdés =

Chilean essayist

Adriana Valdés Budge
- Born: Adriana Valdés Budge; October 3, 1943; Santiago, Chile
- Writing career
- Notable awards: 2010 Altazor Prize in literary essay category for her book of Enrique Lihn
- Literary movement: Essayist

Adriana Valdés Budge (born October 3, 1943 in Santiago, Chile) is a Chilean writer essayist.

== Biography ==
Valdés studied at the Catholic University of Chile. She taught literature at that University (1965–1975) and, after 25 years working for the United Nations, went back to postgraduate teaching on arts at the University of Chile for some years after 2002.

She writes on visual arts and literature. Two collections of her essays were published in book form, in 1996 and 2006. With Pedro Lastra she co-edited the posthumous book of Enrique Lihn, "Diario de muerte", in 1989. She was named a Fellow of the Chilean Academy of Language in 1993. In 2010 she became the first woman to serve as deputy director of the Academy. She was reelected to this position in 2013.

She received the 2010 Altazor Award in literary essay category for her book Enrique Lihn: vistas parciales, and in 2013 was short-listed for the same award for her book on "De ángeles y ninfas", on Aby Warburg and Walter Benjamin. Along with Alfredo Jaar, she published Studies on Happiness, Barcelona, 1999. She has edited a book on the painter Roser Bru (1996) and two books about the artist Alfredo Jaar: Jaar/SCL/2006 and Venezia, Venezia (2013).

In 2018 she received the Santiago Municipal Literature Award in the Essay category for Redefinir lo humano: las humanidades en el siglo XXI.

== Books ==
- Composición de lugar. Escritos sobre cultura. Santiago: Editorial Universitaria, 1996.
- Memorias visuales. Arte contemporáneo en Chile. Santiago: Metales Pesados, 2006.
- Enrique Lihn: vistas parciales. Santiago: Palinodia, 2008.
- Señoras del buen morir (poetry). Santiago: Orjikh, 2011.
- De ángeles y ninfas. Conjeturas sobre la imagen en Warburg y Benjamin. Santiago: Orjikh, 2012.
