= Carlos Correa (disambiguation) =

Carlos Correa (born 1994) is a Puerto Rican baseball player.

Carlos Correa may also refer to:

- Carlos Correa y Toro (1824–1905), Chilean farmer and politician
- Carlos René Correa (1912–1999), Chilean poet
- Gabriel Correa (footballer) (Carlos Gabriel Correa Viana, born 1968), Uruguayan footballer and coach
- Carlos Rodrigues Corrêa (born 1980), Brazilian footballer
- Carlos Correa (activist), Venezuelan activist, journalist and business leader
- Carlos Correa (footballer), Uruguayan footballer
- Carlos M. Correa, executive director of the South Centre organization
