= María Elvira Piwonka =

Chilean writer and poet

María Elvira Piwonka Moreno (Santiago, 1913 - 2006) was a Chilean writer and poet. She is a laureate of the Santiago Municipal Poetry Prize and the Santiago Municipal Literature Award.

== Biography ==
Along with Homero Arce, Stella Corvalán, Mila Oyarzún, among others, María Elvira Piwonka Moreno is included in a group of writers close to the Generation of '38. Alongside María Monvel, Chela Reyes, Sylvia Moore, Gladys Thein, Mila Oyarzún and Irma Astorga, Piwonka is included within the so-called “new poetry” of Chile from the late 1950s.

One of the first literary works published by her was the poetry book Íntima through the Tegualda publishing house (1946). In 1949, she received the Santiago Municipal Poetry Prize for her second publication: Llamarlo amor (Call it love).

In 1985, the poem "La pequeña súplica" (The small plea) from the book Intima was set to music by the singer-songwriter Norman Ilic, and won the first prize in the program "Esquinazo" on TV Channel 13 in a contest called "musicalización de poemas" (musicalization of poems).

== Awards ==
- 1949, Santiago Municipal Poetry Prize
- 1950, Santiago Municipal Literature Award

== Works ==
- Íntima (Santiago, Tegualda, 1946)
- Llamarlo amor (Santiago, 1949)
- Lazo de arena (Santiago, Grupo Fuego, 1957)
- Selected poems translated by Clark Mills, (New York City, Osmar, 1967)

=== In anthologies ===
- Guía de la poesía erótica en Chile
