= Stella Corvalán =

Chilean writer and poet (1913–1994)

- Born: Stella Corvalán Vega; 25 November 1913; Talca, Chile
- Died: 1994 (aged 80–81); Santiago, Chile
- Occupations: Writer, poet
- Years active: 1940–1994
- Movement: Surrealism; Generation of '38

Stella Corvalán Vega (25 November 1913 – 1994) was a Chilean writer and poet. She mainly explored the genre of poetry ascribing itself to an aesthetic stance close to surrealism. She is included together with Homero Arce, María Elvira Piwonka, Mila Oyarzún, and others in the group of writers known as the Generation of '38.

== Biography ==
Stella Corvalán was born in Talca on 13 November 1913. One of her first publications was Sombra en el aire in 1940, which in the opinion of writer and literary critic Carlos René Correa, "stands out with signs of original class, of expressive force and of true depth." Her poetic work "is characterized by the ability to evoke the absent, and the ability to organize in her texts what is politically called 'the feminine', that is, the world of emotions, intuition, sensitivity tied to a knowledge of those emotions."

Her work was published and recognized in various countries in Latin America and Europe, followed by renowned intellectuals such as Francis de Miomandre, Pío Baroja, and Giovanni Papini, illustrated by artists such as Agnes Van Den Brandeler in Sinfonía del viento (Madrid, 1951), and referenced by writers like Uruguayan Juana de Ibarbourou in the poem "A Stella Corvalán".

Corvalán died in Santiago in 1994.

On 26 September 2022, a deposit of unedited writings, drawings and photos were found buried in the terrains of Arreboles del Panul, a Waldorf school in the commune of La Florida, Santiago of Chile. The Center of Patrimony Documentation of the University of Talca took charge of their study and conservation.

== Works ==
- Sombra en el aire (Ateneo, Buenos Aires, 1940)
- Palabras (Imp. Universitaria, Santiago, 1943)
- Rostros del mar (1947)
- Geografía azul (Escuela Nacional de Artes Gráficas, Santiago, 1948)
- Amphion (1949)
- Responso de mi sangre (Artes Gráficas, Santiago, 1950)
- Sinfonía del viento (Ínsula, Madrid, 1951)
- Sinfonía de la angustia (1955)
- La luna rota: (memorias de mi infancia) (1957)
- Nocuentos (1967)
- Sinfonía del viento (1968)
