= Biblioteca de Santiago =

Coordinates: 33.4444°S 70.6787°W

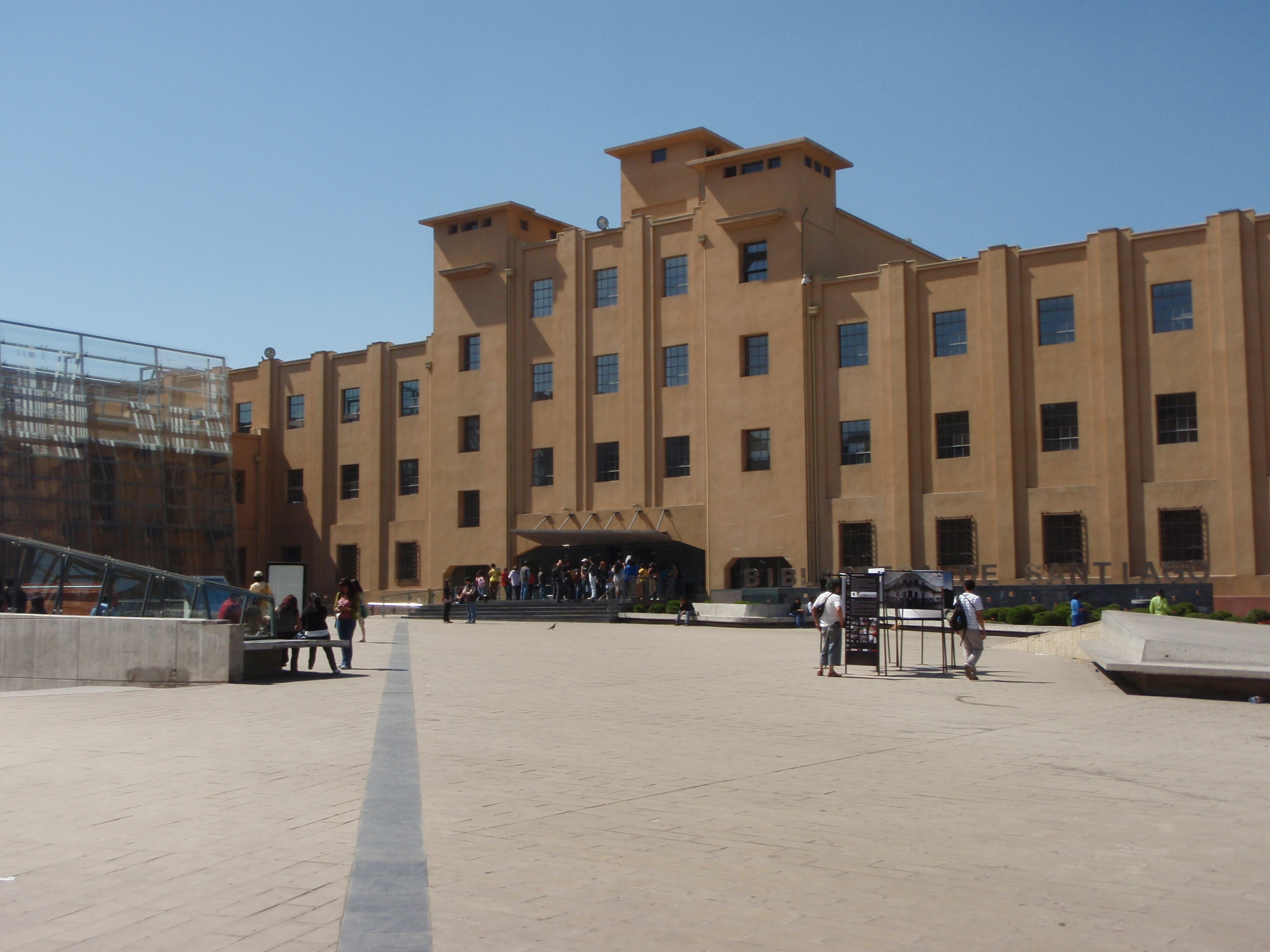
- Location: Chile
- Type: Public library
- Service area: 2.2 ha

Other information
- Website: Biblioteca de Santiago

The Biblioteca de Santiago (BDS) is a public library in downtown Santiago, Chile. It was inaugurated on November 11, 2005 by the then president of Chile Ricardo Lagos. The library is operated by the Servicio Nacional del Patrimonio Cultural, and is the largest and most advanced public library in Chile. The library occupies an entire city block bounded by Agustinas, Matucana, Moneda and Chacabuco Streets.

The library serves the Santiago Metropolitan Region, complementing the services offered by the municipal libraries and the Biblioteca Nacional, filling the gap between both kinds of libraries. On the other hand, the general public is the target audience of the library, while the Biblioteca Nacional focuses on the protection of specialized book volumes and bibliographical research.

Located in the Barrio Yungay, the library occupies 22,000 square metres (240,000 sq ft) of a building that was the former headquarters for the Dirección de Aprovisionamiento del Estado. The building was converted into a set of reading rooms, an auditorium, conferences room, computer rooms and other facilities. The original building was built in the 1930s and was declared a historic monument.

== History ==
The building that currently houses the Biblioteca de Santiago was built between 1928 and 1945. As of 2000, the building served as a warehouse operated by the Dirección de Aprovisionamiento del Estado (DAE). In 2001, it changed hands to the Dirección de Bibliotecas, Archivos y Museos for its remodeling. That year its facade was declared a Historic Monument. The Ministerio de Obras Públicas, which was a partner for the rebuilding, selected Cox y Ugarte as the architecture firm for the remodeling project. The library was created to encourage the urban renewal of the surrounding area, which includes the Centro Cultural Matucana 100, Quinta Normal Park and the Museum of Memory and Human Rights.

== Rooms ==
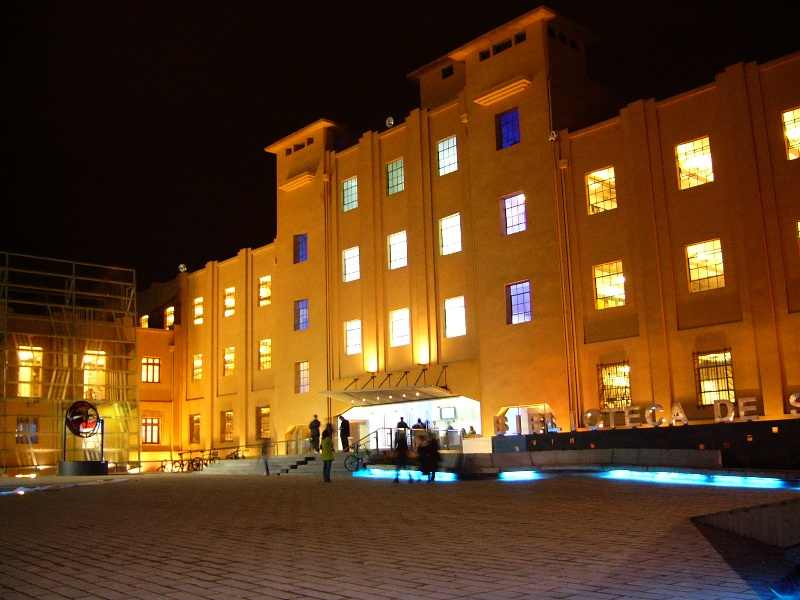
Night view

The library features 8 reading rooms.
