= Guillermo Feliú Cruz =

Chilean historian, bibliographer and librarian

Guillermo Feliú Cruz (1900–1973) was a Chilean historian, bibliographer and librarian. He learned historical method by José Toribio Medina who later successfully proposed Feliú Cruz as curator of Biblioteca Americana in the Biblioteca Nacional de Chile.

== Selected publications ==
- Biblioteca Nacional (Chile) Guillermo Feliú Cruz and José Toribio Medina. 1928. Catálogo Breve De La Biblioteca Americana Que Obsequia a La Nacional De Santiago J.t. Medina ... Manuscritos. Santiago de Chile: Imprenta universitaria.
- Feliú Cruz Guillermo. 1952. Medina Centennial Celebration. Washington D.C: Pan American Union.
