= Eduardo Anguita =

Chilean poet (1914–1992)

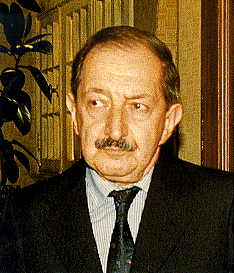
- Born: Eduardo Anguita Cuéllar; November 1914; Yerbas Buenas, Linares, Chile
- Died: August 12, 1992 (aged 77); Santiago de Chile, Chile
- Education: College of the Augustine Fathers; Pontifical Catholic University of Chile (dropped out)
- Occupation: Poet
- Awards: Chilean National Prize for Literature

Eduardo Anguita Cuéllar (Yerbas Buenas, Linares November 1914 - Santiago de Chile August 12, 1992) was a Chilean poet, who was awarded the Chilean National Prize for Literature in 1988.

== Life ==
Eduardo Anguita was raised in San Bernardo, before integrating the College of the Augustine Fathers in Santiago. At 16, he began law studies in the Catholic University of Chile, which he dropped three years later in order to dedicate himself to literature. From then on, he collaborated to many reviews and newspapers, such as Ercilla, Plan, Atenea, La Nación, El Mercurio, etc. He also worked in advertising agencies and in various radios.

His first poems were published in 1934 under the name Tránsito al fin, and translated in English in 1942. A member of the Generation of 38, Eduardo Anguita started his literary career during a period marked by Surrealism and Creationism, a movement headed by Vicente Huidobro, to whom he became a close friend.

Alongside Volodia Teitelboim, Anguita published in 1935 the Antología de Poesía Chilena Nueva, which included poems by Vicente Huidobro, Rosamel del Valle, Pablo de Rokha, Pablo Neruda, Humberto Díaz Casanueva, Omar Cáceres, Angel Cruchaga Santa María, Juvencio Valle and both Anguita himself and Teitelboim. Three years later, a short story by Anguita (Las Hormigas Devoran a un Hombre Llamado David) was included in Miguel Serrano's Antología del verdadero cuento en Chile.

The US New Directions Publishers selected him in 1944, along with his friend Pablo Neruda, to be part of its yearly anthology of Latin-American contemporary poetry.

During Carlos Ibáñez del Campo's government (1955), he was named cultural attache in Mexico, where he published Palabras al oído de México in 1960.

At the end of his life he worked at the Editorial Universitaria as a publisher.

== Works ==
=== Topics ===
Anguita has been considered a metaphysical poet due to the nature of the topics he writes about and the philosophical reflection he makes about them in his poetry. His principal subjects include beauty, death, the temporary nature of man, and memory.

There is also space in his work for the topic of religion, as the poet was openly associated with Catholicism. However, he was not an orthodox catholic and was influenced by various ideas. These include the pagan idea of an animated reality and the repeal of "myself" from Buddhism, as well as ideals from profane poets connected with the appraisal of the body and eroticism. It is due to the latter influence that an erotic relationship with divinity can be seen in some of his poems.

His work is summarized as a metaphysical and erotic poetry, always linked to a religious character.

=== His conception of poetry ===
It is necessary to depart from the idea that Anguita focuses on a poetry completely separated from mimesis; it's an intellectual poetry.

In the introduction to the anthology he creates alongside fellow Chilean author Teitelboim, both expound upon the concept of the function of poetry. In this manner of thought, poetry would be a way for the soul to speak and ask that it be considered in the universe; it cannot be simply thought of as an item of entertainment.

Anguita has said that for him, poetry is first the vision of something and should always be expressed this way the first time.

He establishes a radical difference between the language of poetry and everyday language. The commonly used tongue would be developing in a vigilant state of conscience, while poetry is produced by the clashing of the conscience and the subconscious.

== Bibliography ==
- 1934: Tránsito al fin (poesía).
- 1935: Antología de la Poesía Chilena Nueva (antología junto con Volodia Teitelboim).
- 1948: Últimos poemas (poesía).
- 1945: Antología de Vicente Huidobro (antología).
- 1950: Inseguridad del hombre (relatos).
- 1951: Anguita, cinco poemas (poesía).
- 1960: Palabras al oído de México (prosa y poesía).
- 1962: El poliedro y el mar (poesía).
- 1963: Rimbaud pecador (ensayo).
- 1967: Venus en el pudridero (poesía).
- 1970: Poesía Entera (antología).
- 1980: Se publica nuevamente, corregido, Venus en el pudridero.
- 1988: La belleza del pensar (crónicas).

== Awards ==
- 1963: Premio de la Municipalidad de Santiago en poesía. Por El poliedro y el mar.
- 1972: Premio de poesía de la Municipalidad de Santiago. Por Poesía entera.
- 1981: Premio María Luisa Bombal de la Municipalidad de Viña del Mar.
- 1988: Premio Nacional de Literatura.
