= Nicomedes Guzmán =

Chilean writer, editor, poet and novelist

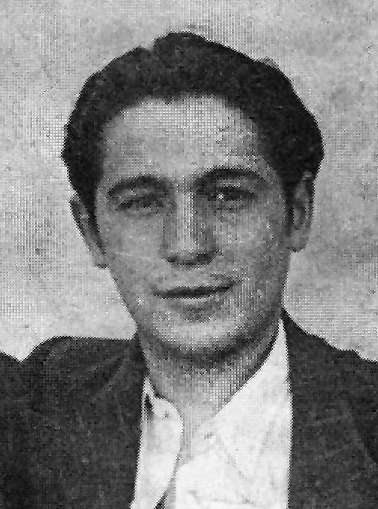
Nicomedes Guzmán

Nicomedes Guzmán (June 25, 1914 in Santiago, Chile – June 26, 1964, also in Santiago), was a Chilean writer, editor, poet, and novelist.

== Biography ==
The second of twelve children born to Nicomedes Vásquez Arzola and Rosa Guzmán Acevedo, his full legal name was Óscar Nicomedes Vásquez Guzmán.

Guzmán's father worked in several jobs including as a streetcar motorman, a doorman, and an ice cream peddler. Guzmán's mother was a housewife and augmented their small income by caring for upper-class homes on occasion (Pearson 1976: 4-5).

His formal education was often interrupted by his having to work —as a precocious laborer- to help the large family. Thus his scholarly development was largely autodictic. At age eleven he was a typesetter and bookbinder's assistant; later he was a truck-driver's helper and an errand boy. He carried boxes in a factory and, at age sixteen, obtained a job in a real-estate brokerage. He studied in evening classes in the Federico Hanssen Night School (Pearson 5).

He married Lucia Del Cármen Salazar Vidal, and they had five children. He had a further two children from a later marriage with the psychologist and social worker Esther Josefina Panay Pérez.

His first novel was Los hombres oscuros/obscuros and his second was La sangre y la esperanza (Blood and Hope).

Guzmán died the day after his fiftieth birthday.

== Works ==
Novels and Short Story collections

- Los Hombres Oscuros (often spelled obscuros) (1939)
- La Sangre y la Esperanza (1943)
- Donde Nace el Alba (1944)
- La Carne Iluminada (1945)
- La Luz Viene del Mar (1951)
- Una Moneda al Río y Otros Cuentos (1954)
- El Pan Bajo la Bota (1960)

Poetry

- La Ceniza y el Sueño (1938)

Anthologies

- Nuevos Cuentistas Chilenos (1941)
- Antología de Baldomero Lillo (1955)
- Antología de Carlos Pezoa Véliz (1957)
- Autorretrato de Chile (1957)
- Antología de Cuentos [de] Marta Brunet (1962)
- Antología de Cuentos Chileno (póstuma, 1969)

== Sources ==
- Ferrero, Mario (1982). Nicomedes Guzmán y la Generación del 38. Santiago de Chile: Ediciones Mar Afuera.
- Guzmán, Nicomedes (2007). Estampas populares de Chile: Crónicas. Santiago de Chile: RIL Editores. ISBN 978-956-284-540-3.
- Pearson, Lon (1976). Nicomedes Guzmán. Proletarian author in Chile's literary generation of 1938. Columbia: University of Missouri Press. ISBN 0-8262-0178-4.
- Promis [Ojeda], José (1993). La novela chilena del último siglo. Santiago: La Noria.
