= Carlos Droguett =

Chilean writer (1912–1996)

Carlos Droguett (14 October 1912 – 30 July 1996) was a Chilean writer. In 1970 he won the Chilean National Prize for Literature and the Premio Alfaguara de Novela.
