= La Segunda =

Chilean afternoon daily newspaper

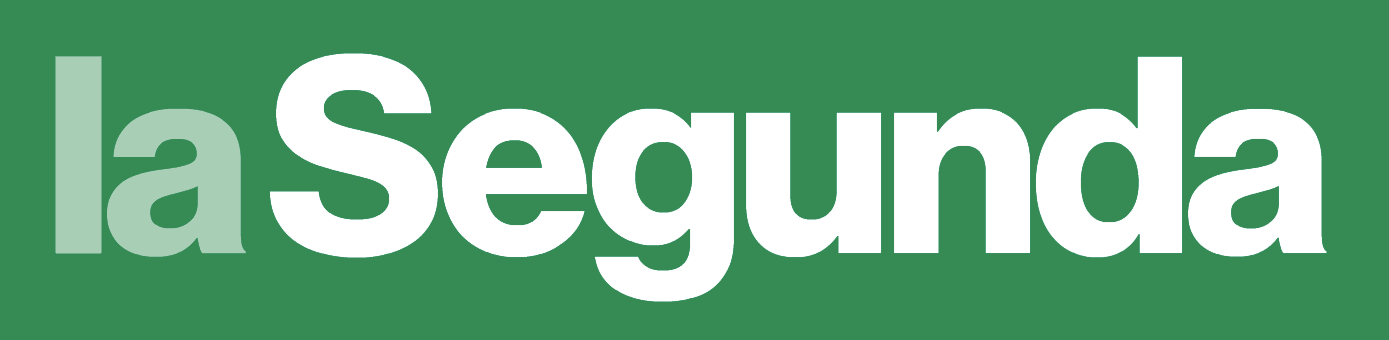
- Front page of La Segunda's 4 June 2014 edition. Front page of La Segunda's 4 June 2014 edition.
- Type: Daily newspaper
- Format: Tabloid
- Political alignment: Right-wing, Conservative
- Headquarters: Santiago, Chile

La Segunda (Spanish: The second one) is a Chilean national evening newspaper, owned by El Mercurio SAP, the parent company of El Mercurio. It is published in Santiago.

Their tendency is conservative, as the first Chilean newspaper to disclose information that occurred in the morning because it is evening. Its time distribution is from 14:00.

La Segunda (initially called La Segunda de Las Últimas Noticias) first appeared as a nightly on July 29, 1931, as an update of the then evening Las Últimas Noticias, due to the overabundance of information originated during the fall of President Carlos Ibáñez del Campo.

The newspaper is remembered for its opposition to the government of Salvador Allende and its accession to the military regime. During those times was used as a means of government propaganda, publishing news with sensationalist and confrontational language that was considered inappropriate for El Mercurio. Famous is the cover of La Segunda newspaper of July 24, 1975, which stated that members of the Revolutionary Left Movement (MIR) were killing each outside Chile, being finally discovered that all were killed within Chile, in what became known as Operation Colombo. The headline that day read "exterminados como ratas" ('exterminated like rats').

Since the 2000s (decade), La Segunda expanded its distribution to the regions of Valparaíso, Metropolitan of Santiago and O'Higgins. In other regions, the newspaper is distributed the following day.
