= Héctor Libertella =

Argentine writer

Héctor Libertella (24 August 1945–7 October 2006) was an Argentine writer of novels, short stories, and essays.

== Life ==
Libertella was born in Bahía Blanca on 24 August 1945. In addition to writing, he worked in publishing, including at Fondo de Cultura Económica and Monte Ávila, and taught at universities in New York, Mexico, and Buenos Aires. He also worked as a researcher and philologist at the Consejo Nacional de Investigaciones Científicas y Técnicas de la Argentina (National Council for Scientific and Technical Research of Argentina). He died in Buenos Aires in October 2006.

== Writing ==
Libertella's first published novel, El camino de los hiperbóreos (The Road of the Hyperboreans, 1968), won the Premio Paidós. He went on to publish four more novels, together with collections of essays and other works. His final book, La leyenda de Jorge Bonino (The Legend of Jorge Bonino), appeared posthumously in 2010.

Libertella was part of the post-Boom period in Latin American literature, following the 1960s Boom represented by writers such as Carlos Fuentes and Gabriel García Márquez. Together with figures such as Cesar Aira, Copi, and Osvaldo Lamborghini, Libertella formed a countercanon of alternative Argentine literature, that rejected serious, well-written, and elite literature for linguistic estrangement and improvisation. Libertella was noted for his interest in radical linguistic innovation and his attempt "to privilege écriture, the novela del lenguaje (the novel of/about language), as the offspring of the Aufhebung or sublation of the Boom".

== Works published ==
- The Road of the Hyperboreans, novel, Ed, Buenos Aires, 1968.
- Adventures of Miticistas, novel, Ed Monte Avila, Caracas, 1971.
- People Fighting Pose, novel, Ed Corregidor, Buenos Aires, 1975.
- New Latin American Writing, Essay, Ed Monte Avila, Caracas / Buenos Aires, 1977.
- Cavemen! Stories Abbat Per Ed, Buenos Aires, 1985.
- The International Tour of the Wicked, novella, Latin American Publishing Group, Buenos Aires, 1990.
- Tests or Tests on a Tight Network, essays, Latin American Publishing Group, Buenos Aires, 1990.
- Pathografeia. Diverted Games Literature, Conversations, Latin American Publishing Group, Buenos Aires, 1991.
- The Sacred Writings, Critical Essays, Ed Sudamericana, Buenos Aires, 1993.
- Memoirs of a Demigod, novel, Ed Profile, Buenos Aires, 1998.
- The Tree Saussure, Story-Utopia, Ed Adriana Hidalgo, Buenos Aires, 2000.
- Literal 1973-1977, (ed.), Buenos Aires, Santiago Arcos editor, 2002.
- The Bookseller Argentina, Cordoba, editor Alcyone, 2003.
- The Legend of Jorge Bonino, Córdoba, editor Alcyone, 2010
