= María Monvel =

Chilean poet

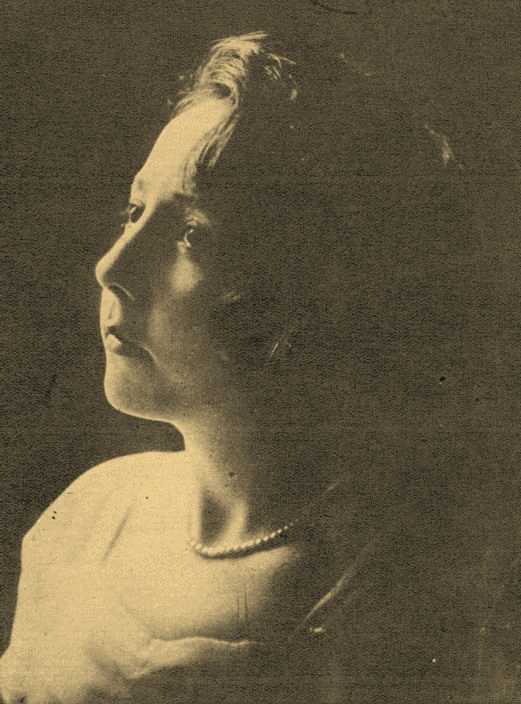
- María Monvel
- Born: Tilda Brito; 1899
- Died: 1936 (aged 36–37)
- Occupation: Poet
- Writing career
- Notable work: Praised by Gabriela Mistral

María Monvel (born Tilda Brito in 1899; died 1936) was a Chilean poet of national significance. Her work was highly praised by Gabriela Mistral.
