= Las Últimas Noticias =

Chilean middle market tabloid newspaper

- Front page of the 11 September 2013 edition of Las Últimas Noticias Front page of the 11 September 2013 edition of Las Últimas Noticias
- Type: Daily newspaper
- Format: Tabloid
- Owner: Agustín Edwards
- Founded: 1902
- Headquarters: Santiago, Chile
- Website: www.lun.com

Las Últimas Noticias (Spanish: The Latest News) is a Chilean, daily middle market tabloid newspaper owned by El Mercurio SAP. This company publishes various newspapers for a different audience: El Mercurio people look up to and ability to view, mainly close to the reading, La Segunda mainly a diary of "synthesis" news and evening edition, and Las Últimas Noticias is made profile tabloid, focused mainly on entertainment and gossip, so it is one of the best-selling newspapers in the country.

== History ==
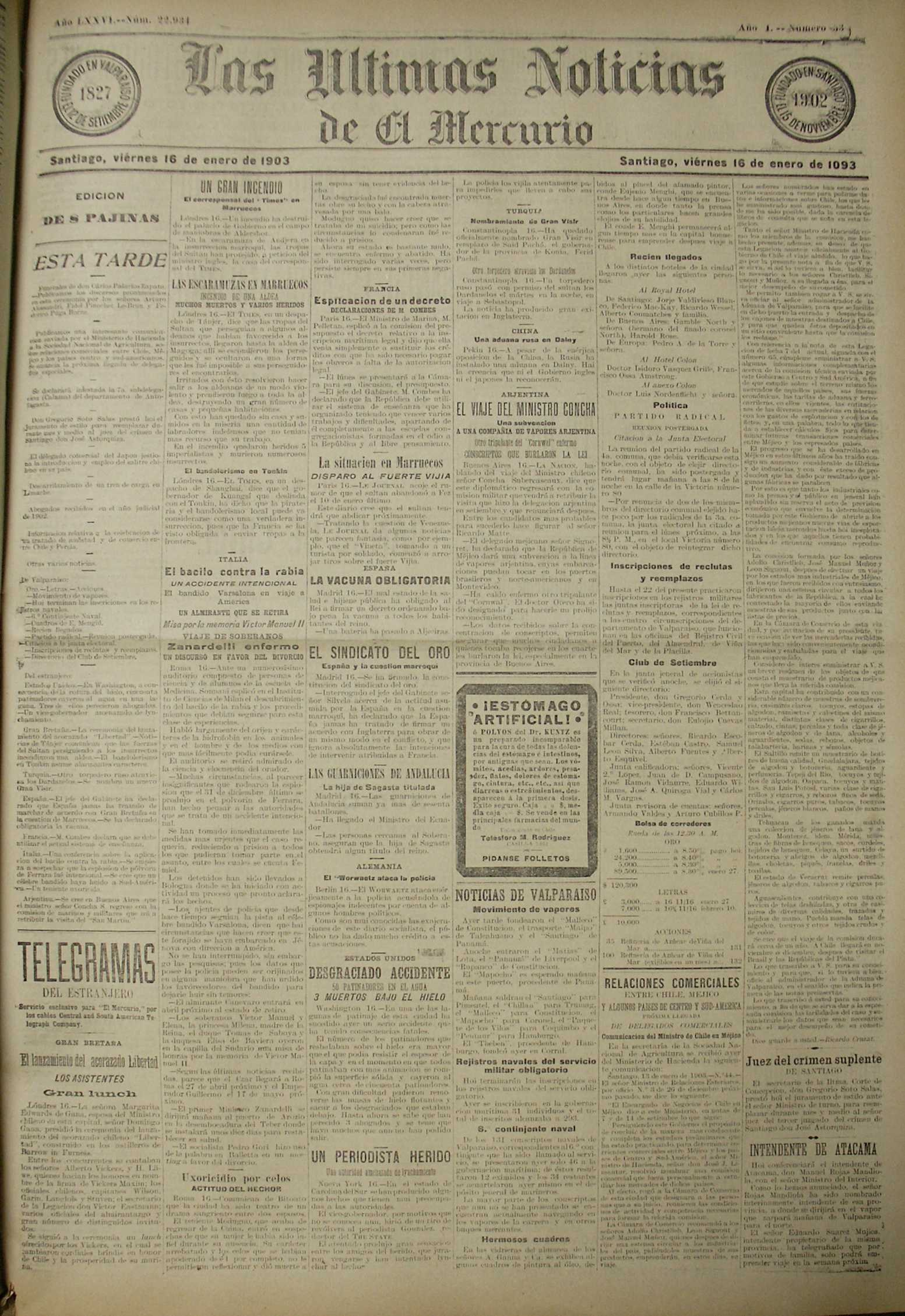
16 January 1903 (number 53) edition of Las Últimas Noticias de El Mercurio

The newspaper was founded on November 15, 1902 by the owner of El Mercurio, Agustín Edwards Mac Clure, after having made a trip to the United States as to the progress of the press. From that trip, Edwards implemented a series of reforms in his company, starting with the transformation of El Mercurio into a morning newspaper, and creating Las Últimas Noticias de El Mercurio 'The Latest News of El Mercurio' (posted in the afternoon). The first director of Las Últimas Noticias was the writer Joaquín Díaz Garcés.

In 1928, Las Últimas Noticias went from broadsheet to tabloid format. In 1931, the overabundance of information generated during the fall of President Carlos Ibáñez del Campo, necessitated the emergence of a segunda edición de Las Últimas Noticias (second edition of Las Últimas Noticias), which would result in today's evening newspaper La Segunda.

Over time, Las Últimas Noticias became a morning edition, aimed at the middle and with a strong emphasis on law enforcement issues. This model brought a strong success until the 1980s, when it published, for example, Ñoñobañez comic, Calvin and Hobbes and Condorito. With the return of democracy, however, the consumption habits of Chileans began to change and the newspaper reports no longer had the same interest as before in the population.

In 1994, Las Últimas Noticias became the first Chilean newspaper produced entirely in digital. On July 19 of that year, at 18:42 hours, LUN received the first electronic test page of the El Mercurio press site from its offices at 0112 Bellavista Street, via fiber optics.

In the late 1990s and early 2000s, the daily newspaper became an entertainment media (discarding most of its supplements), approaching and adapting to the styles of the British Daily Mirror and American the New York Post, becoming the best selling newspaper in Chile. It also has an online edition since mid-1990, in internet, that every day it can read news for free via this medium.
