= Antonio Acevedo Hernández =

Chilean writer (1886–1962)

Pedro Antonio Acevedo Hernández
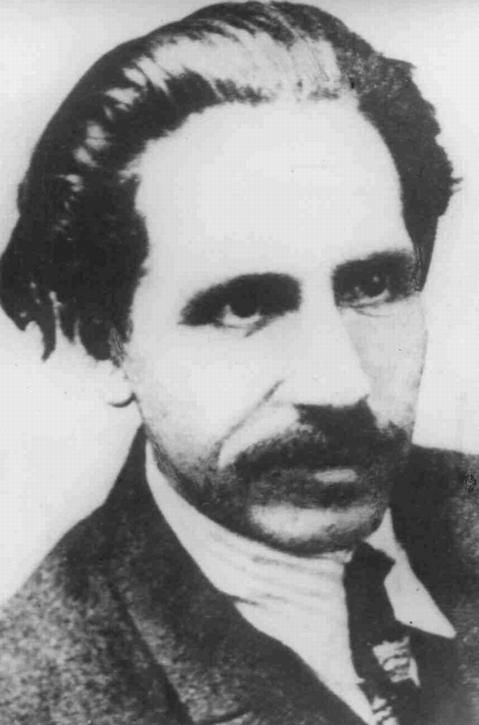
- Born: Tracacura, Angol (Chile).
- Died: 1 December 1962 (aged 76)
- Resting place: Campo Santo
- Occupations: Writer and playwright
- Writing career
- Genres: Dramaturgy and Narrative
- Notable works: Chañarcillo, Joaquín Murieta, Pedro Urdemales
- Literary movement: Realism

Antonio Acevedo Hernández (8 March 1886 – 1 December 1962) was a Chilean writer. Hernández was a self-taught novelist, playwright and writer whose works include theater, novels, short stories, literary and journalistic chronicles, essays, poetry and popular Chilean folklore. He created over 840 works, including the plays Almas perdidas, El Vino triste, La Sangre, and El Rancho. He was awarded the Premio Nacional de Teatro in 1936. His work, along with that of authors like Germán Luco Cruchaga and Armando Moock, marked the beginnings of Chilean dramaturgy.

== Death ==
His difficult years and arteriosclerosis caused him to gradually lose his mental faculties until his death.

Sus funerales fueron grandiosos. Lo único grandioso que tuvo en su vida. Masas de gentes se apostaron en las calles y arrojaron flores al paso del féretro. Despidieron sus restos en el Campo Santo representantes de todas las condiciones políticas y ramas sociales, recibiendo así su cuerpo sin vida los honores de los más grandes, de aquellos que muchas veces quisieron negarle el derecho a la vida.

(in English) His funeral was grandiose. The only grandeur that there was in his life. Masses of people were stationed on the streets and threw flowers as his coffin passed. Representatives of all the political and social branches bid goodbye to his remains in the Campo Santo, thereby his lifeless body received the greatest honors, of those who often wanted to deny him the right to life.

== Work ==
Hernández's work sought, first, to abandon the frequent imitation of theater performances that were in vogue at the time (operettas and light comedies, among others), so his background was often autobiographical. His proletarian reality formed the cornerstone of each of his creations. Therefore, most of his works speak about exploitation, marginalization, alcoholism, violence, and social problems of farmers, miners, laborers and manufacturers. His texts were influenced by both the folklore and popular religion, as well as by his own, often intuitive, reading of texts, ranging from the classics, to productions framed in ideological currents of socialism and anarchism. Acevedo Hernández ventured into this kind of socially engaged theater before the publication of El teatro político (The political theater) by Erwin Piscator in 1929 and El pequeño Organón (Little Organon) by Bertolt Brecht in 1948.

The police force intervened in performances of his works repeatedly, either by censorship or because they caused unrest within the theater; on one occasion, during the premiere of Los deportados (The deportees) in 1931, someone from the audience shot an actor who was portraying a cop.

== Works ==
- Almas Perdidas (1917). Three-act comedy (1918).
- Piedra Azul (1920). Novel.
- La Canción Rota (1921). Novel
- La raza fuerte (1924).
- la hija de todos (1926).
- Arból Viejo (1927). Three-act comedy
- Caín (1927). Biblical
- Manuel Luceño (1927). Adventure Novel.
- Camino de flores (1929).
- De pura cepa (1929).
- Croquis chilenos (1931). Editorial Zig – Zag.
- Las Santiaguinas (1931).
- Por el atajo (1932). Dramatic comedy in four acts.
- La canción rota (1933). Three-act drama.
- Los cantores populares chilenos (1933). Editorial.
- Cardo negro (1933). Three-act comedy.
- Angélica (1934). Three-act comedy.
- El libro de la tierra chilena (1935).
- Joaquín Murieta (1936). Six-act drama.
- Chanarcillo (1937).
- Las aventuras del roto Juan (1938).
- Algo de lo que Ud. ha cantado y canta (1939).
- Canciones populares chilenas (1939).
- La leyenda de la felicidad (1943). Editorial Zig – Zag.
- Pedro Urdemales (1947). Novel. Cultural editorial.
- Leyendas chilenas (1952). Editorial.
- La cueca: orígenes, historia y antología (1953). Editorial.
- Retablo pintoresco de Chile (1953).
- El triángulo tiene cuatro lados (1963).

== Sources ==
- Enciclopedia Temática de Chile (Thematic Encyclopedia of Chile) – Ercilla – Grandes Personajes de la Historia (Great personalities in History)
- Memoria Chilena
- La Escena Chilena (The University of Chile)
- Chile Escena (The Pontifical Catholic University of Chile)
- Logos Library
