= Memoria Chilena =

- Screenshot of Memoria Chilena on 28 June 2014
- Website type: Educational, cultural
- Available in: Spanish
- Owner: Biblioteca Nacional de Chile
- Website: www.memoriachilena.cl
- Commercial: No
- Launched: 2001; 25 years ago
- Current status: Online
- Content license: CC-BY-SA 3.0 (original content); Other content varies

Memoria Chilena (Spanish for Chilean Memory) is a Chilean cultural website which, according to its own words, "offers investigations and documents related to key topics which make up the Chilean identity, accessible through the areas of history, literature, social sciences, music, and visual arts." (Note: Original Spanish quote: "ofrece investigaciones y documentos relativos a los temas claves que conforman la identidad de Chile, accesibles a través de las áreas de Historia, Literatura, Ciencias Sociales, Música y Artes Visuales.") Memoria Chilena is, also, a virtual library, which preserves material from the Biblioteca Nacional de Chile and other institutions from the Dirección de Bibliotecas, Archivos y Museos (DIBAM).

== History ==
The original idea of Memoria Chilena was conceived in 2001. The website states that, "to this day, our objective has been to disseminate the cultural patrimony of Chile through the internet, contributing to the recovery, preservation, and enriching of our historical memory". (Note: Original Spanish quote: "hasta hoy, nuestro objetivo ha sido difundir a través de Internet el patrimonio cultural de Chile, contribuyendo a la recuperación, preservación y fortalecimiento de nuestra memoria histórica.")

== Organization ==
Memoria Chilena organizes its material through topic sites (sitios temáticos), which "approach processes, events, people or relevant works from the Chilean cultural and historic imaginary." (Note: Original Spanish quote: "abordan los procesos, hechos, personajes u obras relevantes del imaginario cultural e histórico de Chile.") Topic sites include a general presentation or description, galleries of images, digitized documents, related bibliography, chronology, links to related topic sites or websites, and sound files. Memoria Chilena, as of May 2012, had 2,800 digitized books, 250 maps of Chile (dated between 1768 and 1929), in addition to an "innumerable" quantity of photographs related to the Chilean history.

== Copyright ==
Memoria Chilena publishes documents and images which belong to collections of the National Library of Chile and other institutions of the DIBAM, which are property of this latter or are otherwise in the public domain. However, digitized materials whose copyright status is active, are used with permission from the copyright owners, for their "exclusive publication in the website." The website also states that "any use of the material published in Memoria Chilena without consent of the copyright owners, is penalized by the Law of Intellectual Property." (Note: Original Spanish quote: "[c]ualquier uso del material difundido en Memoria Chilena sin la autorización de los titulares de sus derechos, está penado por la Ley sobre Propiedad Intelectual.")
