= Volodia Teitelboim =

Chilean politician (1916–2008)

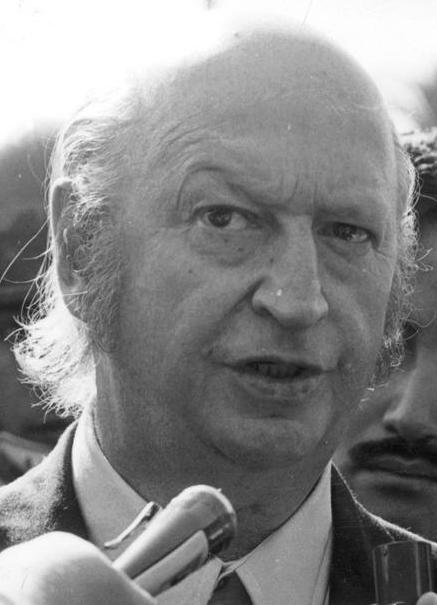
Volodia Teitelboim

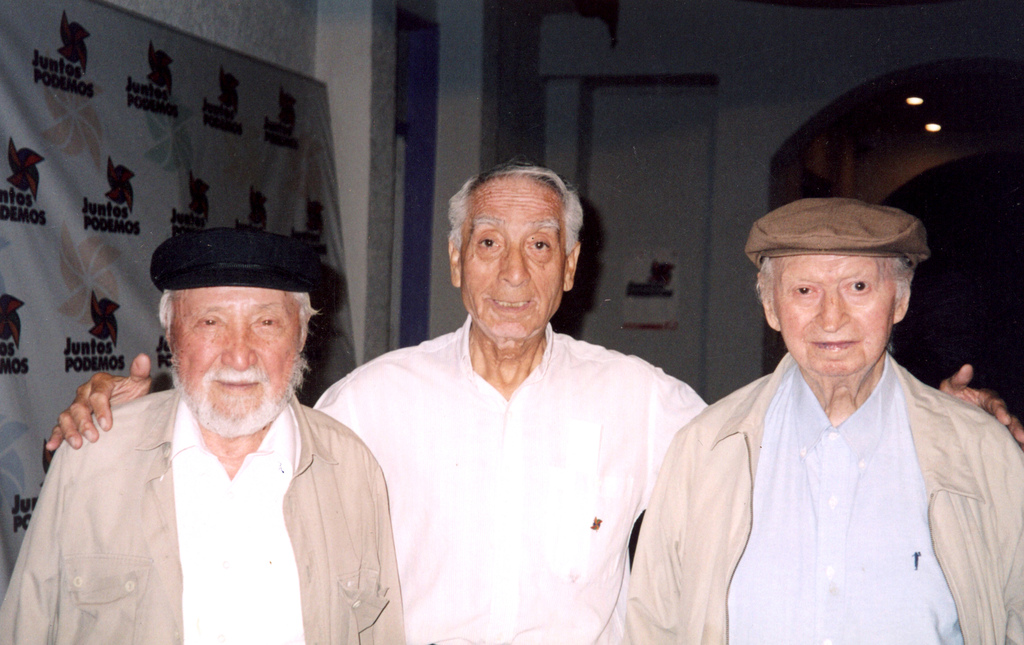
Luis Corvalán, Ernesto Araneda Briones and Teitelboim, 2007

Volodia Teitelboim Volosky (né Valentín Teitelboim Volosky; March 17, 1916 – January 31, 2008) was a Chilean Communist politician, lawyer, and author.

== Personal life ==
Born in Chillán on March 17, 1916 to Jewish immigrants, Moisés Teitelboim (Ukrainian) and Sara Volosky (Moldovan), Teitelboim developed a strong interest in literature from an early age. After completing high school, he pursued his studies at the Faculty of Law of the University of Chile. Upon graduation, he presented his senior thesis titled "The Dawn of Capitalism - The Conquest of America."

At the age of 29, Teitelboim married Raquel Weitzmann, who was also a law student. During the 1940s, Teitelboim, like other members of the Communist Party, was forced to go underground, while Weitzmann became pregnant with the child of a former university colleague. They named the child Claudio, and Teitelboim adopted him, keeping their affair concealed. However, due to Teitelboim's frequent absences caused by party activities, persecution, and imprisonment, their marriage suffered and eventually ended in 1957 when Weitzmann left for Cuba with Jaime Barros. Teitelboim then took sole responsibility for raising Claudio, who was 10 years old at the time. However, in 2005, Claudio discovered the truth about his parentage and severed ties with Teitelboim, adopting his biological father's surname, Bunster.

Teitelboim's second marriage took place when he was 51 years old and was to Eliana Farías. While in exile in Moscow following the Chilean military coup d'état on September 11, 1973, they raised Farías' son, Roberto Nordenflycht, as well as their own daughter, Marina. Roberto, inspired by Teitelboim's communist ideals, joined the Manuel Rodriguez Patriotic Front and tragically lost his life in August 1989 during a guerrilla action in Chile. The grief over Roberto's death eventually led to the end of Teitelboim's marriage to Farías. On the other hand, Marina pursued a career in diplomacy.

Teitelboim died on January 31, 2008, at the Catholic University's hospital in Santiago. He succumbed to kidney failure resulting from lymphatic cancer. It was reported that he and Claudio Bunster reconciled in the end.

== Political career ==
Teitelboim joined the Chilean Communist Party's youth section at the age of sixteen. During the 1940s he endured persecution, along with all the militants of the Communist Party, and was imprisoned in Pisagua under the so-called Democratic Defense Law (also known as Ley maldita, or "cursed law").

In 1961 he was elected to Congress as a Deputy for Valparaíso and Quillota, a post he held until 1965, when he was elected Senator for Santiago. He was re-elected to this post in March 1973, but was only able to further serve in it until Congress was disbanded following the September 11, 1973, coup d'état.

During the military regime of Gen. Augusto Pinochet Teitelboim lived in exile in Moscow, where he launched the twice-weekly radio program Escucha, Chile ("Listen, Chile"). Despite the risk, he clandestinely returned to Chile in 1988 and campaigned for a provisional government following the regime's having been handed a defeat in that year's national plebiscite. The following year he was elected president of the Communist Party, a position he held until 1994.

== Literary work ==
Teitelboim's literary work, for which he was awarded Chile's National Prize in Literature in 2002, as well as the Literature prize of the 1931 Floral Games, is chiefly in the form of memoirs, biographies, and literary essays. His first book Antología de poesía chilena (Anthology of Chilean Poetry) was published in conjunction with Eduardo Anguita in 1932, and compiled the great poets of Chile. He would later say that it committed the errors of omitting Gabriela Mistral and of accentuating the dispute between Vicente Huidobro, Pablo de Rokha, and Pablo Neruda. His series of memoirs, Un muchacho del siglo XX (A Boy of the Twentieth Century, 1997), La gran guerra de Chile y otra que nunca existió (The Great War of Chile and Another That Never Existed, 2000) and Noches de radio (Radio Nights, 2001) present from a political and social perspective the great arch of Chilean history during the 20th century. His best known capacity is that of a biographer, in which he wrote about Jorge Luis Borges, Vicente Huidobro, and with the most critical acclaim, Pablo Neruda and Gabriela Mistral. In terms of membership in literary movements, he is generally located within the Chilean Generation of '38.

=== List of published works ===
- Antología de poesía chilena (Anthology of Chilean Poetry) - 1935
- El amanecer del capitalismo. La conquista de América (The dawn of capitalism. The conquest of America) - 1943
- Hijo del salitre (Son of saltpeter) - 1952
- La semilla en la arena. Pisagua (The seed in the sand) - 1957
- Hombre y hombre (Man and man) - 1969
- El oficio ciudadano (The duty of the citizen) - 1973
- El pan de las estrellas (The bread of the stars) - 1973
- La lucha continúa, pólvora del exilio (The struggle continue, powder from exile) - 1976
- Narradores chilenos del exilio (Chilean storytellers from exile) - 1978
- Neruda - 1984
- La palabra y la sangre (The word and the blood) - 1986
- El corazón escrito (The written heart) - 1986
- En el país prohibido (In the forbidden country) - 1988
- Gabriela Mistral, pública y secreta (Gabriela Mistral, public and secret) - 1991
- Huidobro, la marcha infinita (Huidobro, the infinite march) - 1993
- Los dos Borges (The two Borges) - 1996
- Un muchacho del siglo XX (A Boy of the 20th Century) - 1997
- Notas de un concierto europeo (Notes from a European concert) - 1997
- Voy a vivirme (I am going to live myself) - 1998
- La gran guerra de Chile y otra que nunca existió (The great war of Chile and another which never existed) - 2000
- Noches de radio (Nights of radio) - 2001
- Ulises llega en locomotora (Ulysses arrives in a locomotive) - 2002
