= Carlos René Correa =

Chilean poet

Carlos René Correa (18 September 1912, Rauco – 13 September 1999, Santiago) was a Chilean poet. He studied philosophy in the University of Chile where he also edited the periodical Diario Ilustrado. He served as the director of the Cultural Institute of Santiago with his wife, the writer María Silva Ossa.
