= National Library of Chile =

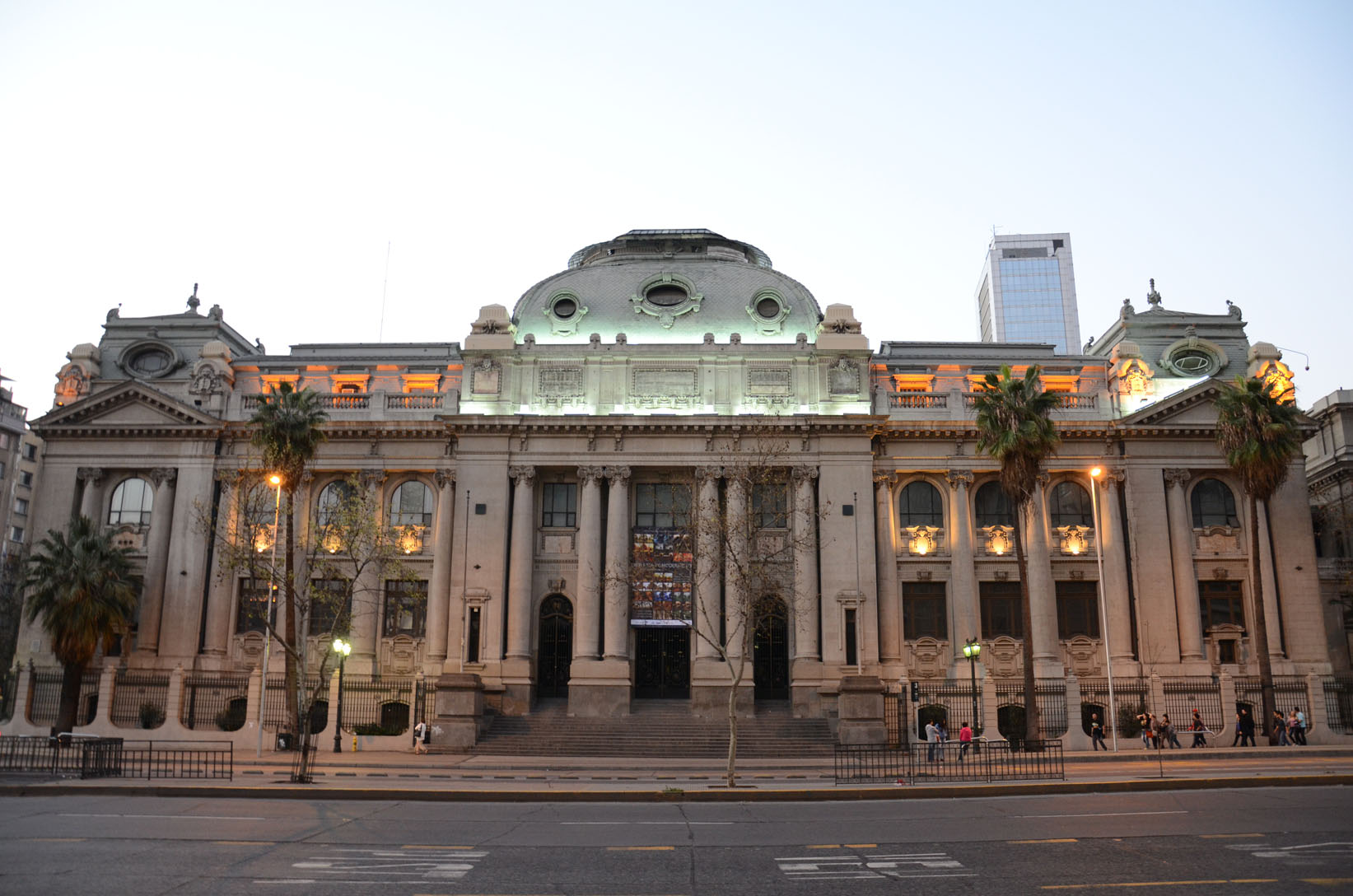
- Front view of the National Library of Chile building
- 33°26′32″S 70°38′45″W
- Location: Santiago
- Established: 1813
- Branches: N/A

Collection
- Size: 1,100,000 registries

Access and use
- Population served: 66,167,182 members of the public

Other information
- Director: Pedro Pablo Zegers Blachet
- Website: www.bibliotecanacional.cl

The National Library of Chile (Spanish: Biblioteca Nacional de Chile) is the national library of Chile. It is located on the Avenida Libertador General Bernardo O'Higgins in Santiago, in a building completed in 1925, though its history reaches to the early nineteenth century before it was relocated to its current home.

== History ==
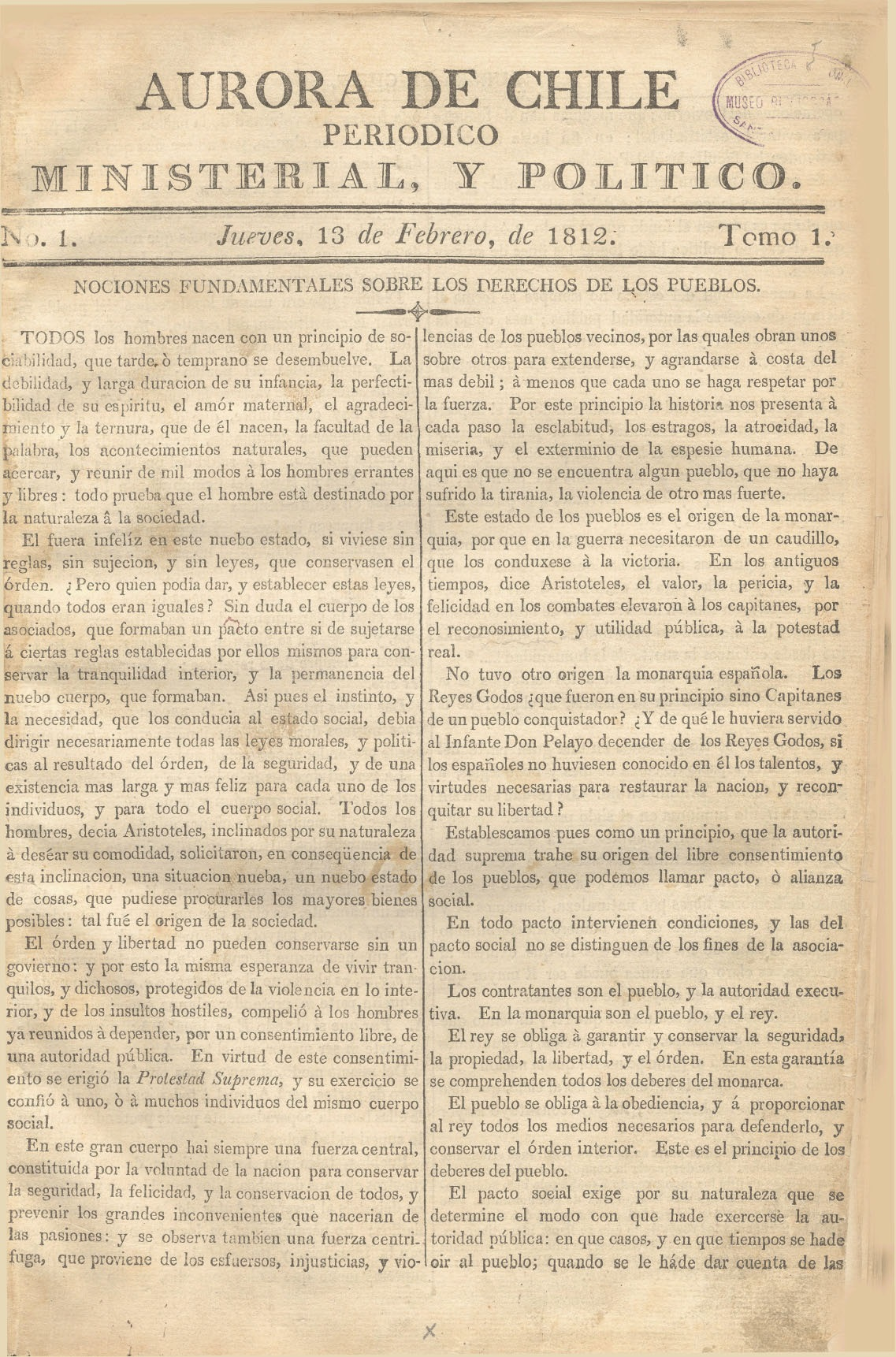
The Aurora de Chile, Chile's first newspaper, is kept at the Biblioteca Nacional.

The Biblioteca Nacional is, together with the Instituto Nacional and a small number of institutions, one of the first institutions created by the newly formed Republic of Chile in the Patria Vieja period. In the newspaper El Monitor Araucano, a Proclama de Fundación ("Proclamation of Foundation") of the Biblioteca Nacional was published on August 19, 1813. With this vision, a call was made to all the citizens to submit their books for the formation of one great public library. As with other republican institutions, the library was closed after the Disaster of Rancagua, in which the national troops were defeated by the army of the realistas. With the victorious Battle of Chacabuco, it was reopened and supported by the government, and started to receive important collections. The Supreme Director of Chile, Bernardo O'Higgins, named professor Manuel de Salas as the first director of the Biblioteca Nacional. In 1822 Friar Camilo Henríquez (director of the Aurora de Chile newspaper) was named as the second head librarian.

Since its creation, the library had been a dependency of the Universidad de San Felipe and its successor, the Universidad de Chile, until it gained autonomy in 1852. In 1913, upon its 100th anniversary, the Biblioteca Nacional acquired the Monasterio de Santa Clara, located on the Alameda de las Delicias on present-day Cerro Santa Lucía. At the creation in 1929, the library was made into a dependency of the Dirección de Bibliotecas, Archivos y Museos.

== Location ==
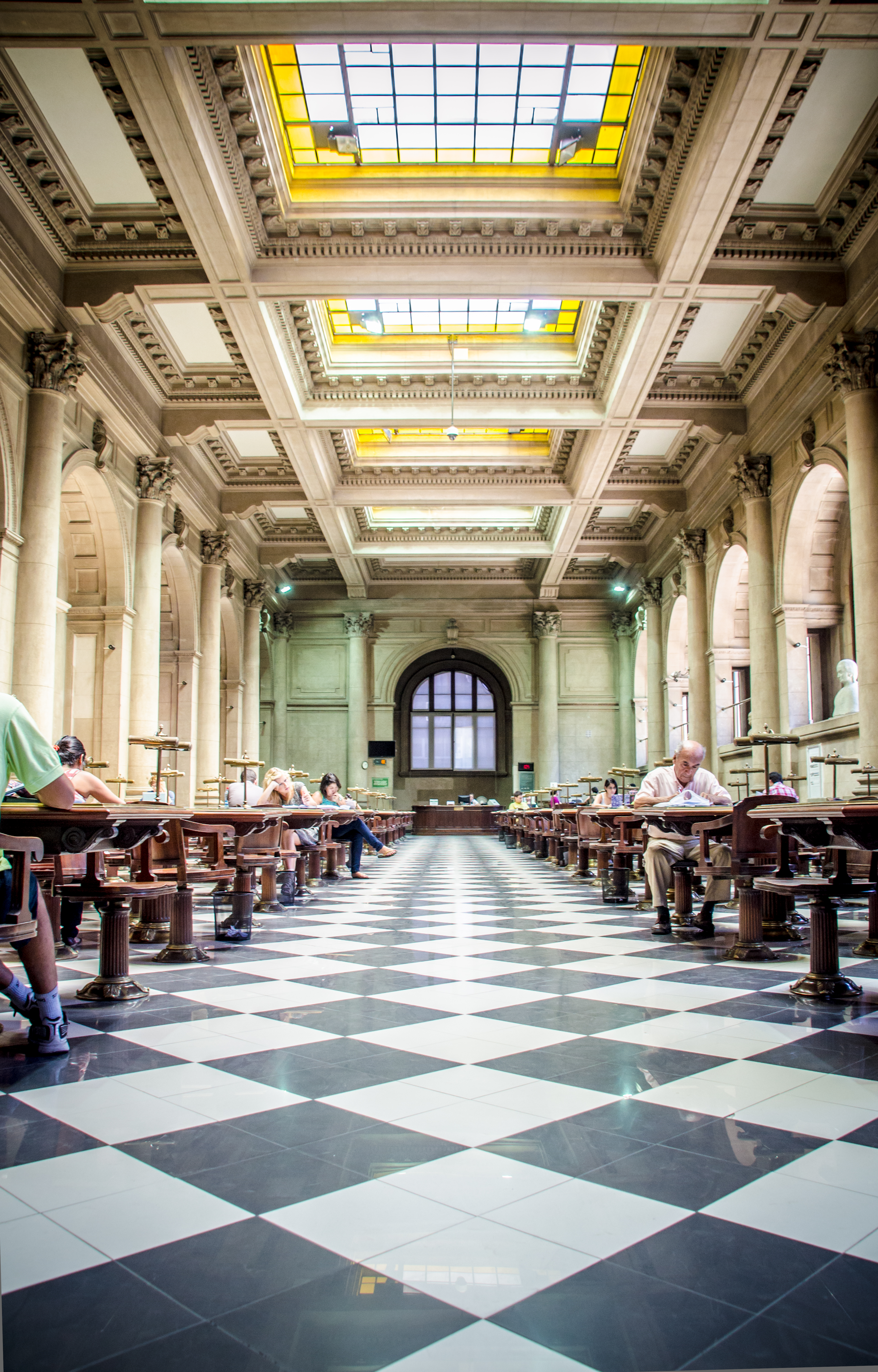
Chilean Hallroom (Sección Chilena) of the Biblioteca Nacional de Chile

Since 1925, Biblioteca Nacional has been situated in the centre of Santiago, Chile. It was formerly located in the square where now stands the Teatro Municipal de Santiago (Municipal Theater of Santiago).

Construction of the present building began in 1913. It was commissioned as one of the commemorative public works in honour of the first centenary of the independence of Chile. The building boasts an imposing façade of columns and arches, of very pronounced French neoclassical influence. The library shares its building with the Archivo Nacional de Chile (the National Archive). Adjoining the building is the Santa Lucía metro station, and to the east is Cerro Santa Lucía.

The interior, spread out over two main levels and a basement, has been embellished and decorated with carved marble staircases, sculptures and paintings from some of the country's classic artists, such as Alfredo Helsby and Arturo Gordon.

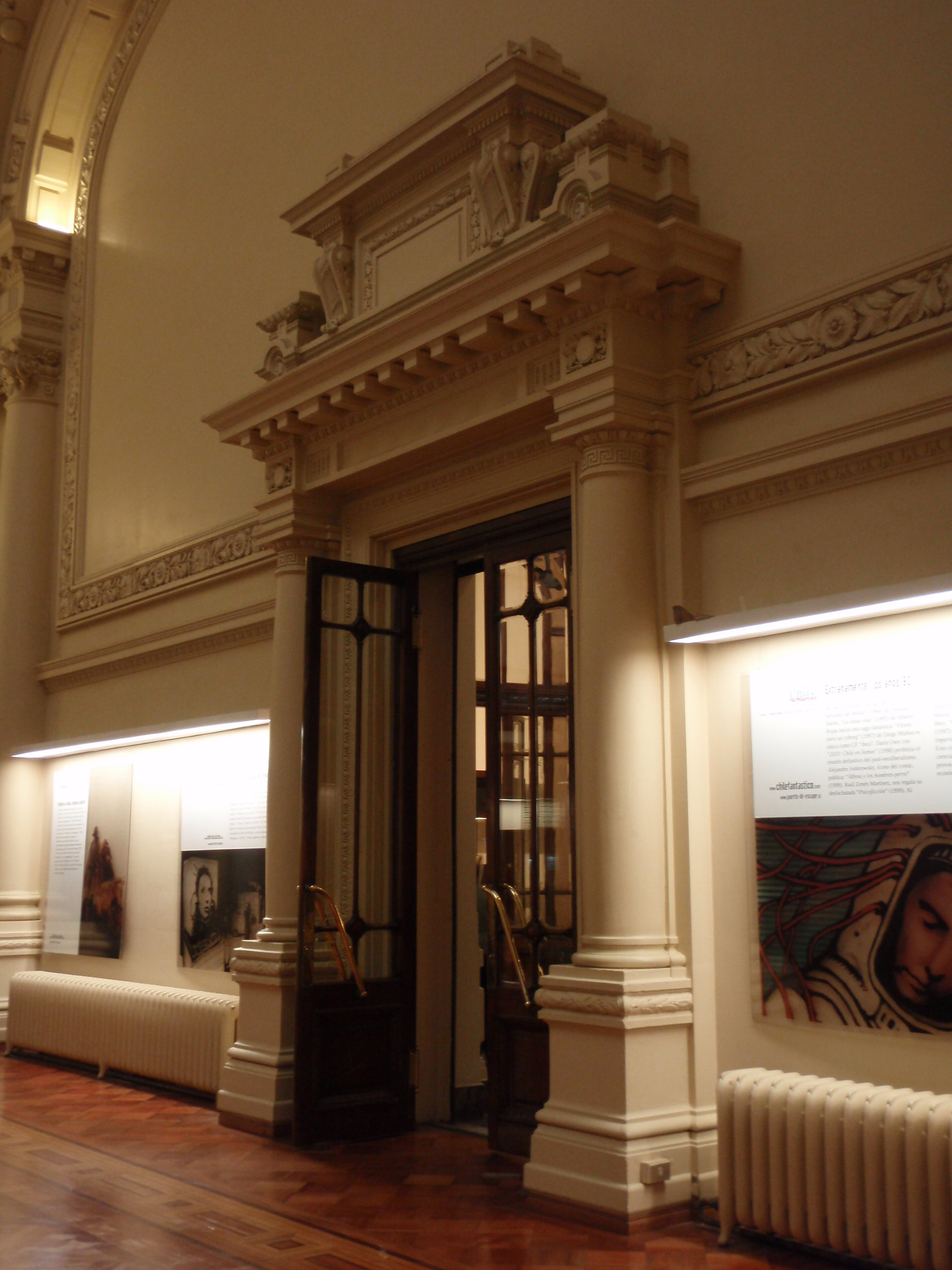
Biblioteca Nacional de Chile, Computers hall, details of the doors

== Collections ==
The Biblioteca Nacional has an extensive and valuable collection of books and manuscripts. Several of these were acquired from or donated by their owners, making up an important national historical treasure. The most important collections include:

Name	Year
Mariano Egaña	1846
Benjamín Vicuña Mackenna	1861
Andrés Bello	1865
Claude Gay	1873
José Ignacio Eyzaguirre Portales	1878
Diego Portales	1878
Aníbal Pinto	1885
Diego Barros Arana	1920
José Toribio Medina	1925
Enrique Matta Vial	1940
Raúl Silva Castro	1970
Guillermo Feliú Cruz	1974
Antonio Doddis	1974

== See also ==
- List of national libraries
- Chilean National Museum of Fine Arts
- Asociación de Estados Iberoamericanos para el Desarrollo de las Bibliotecas Nacionales de Iberoamérica
- Biblioteca de Santiago
- Digital National Library of Chile
