= Angel Cruchaga Santa María =

Chilean writer (1893–1964)

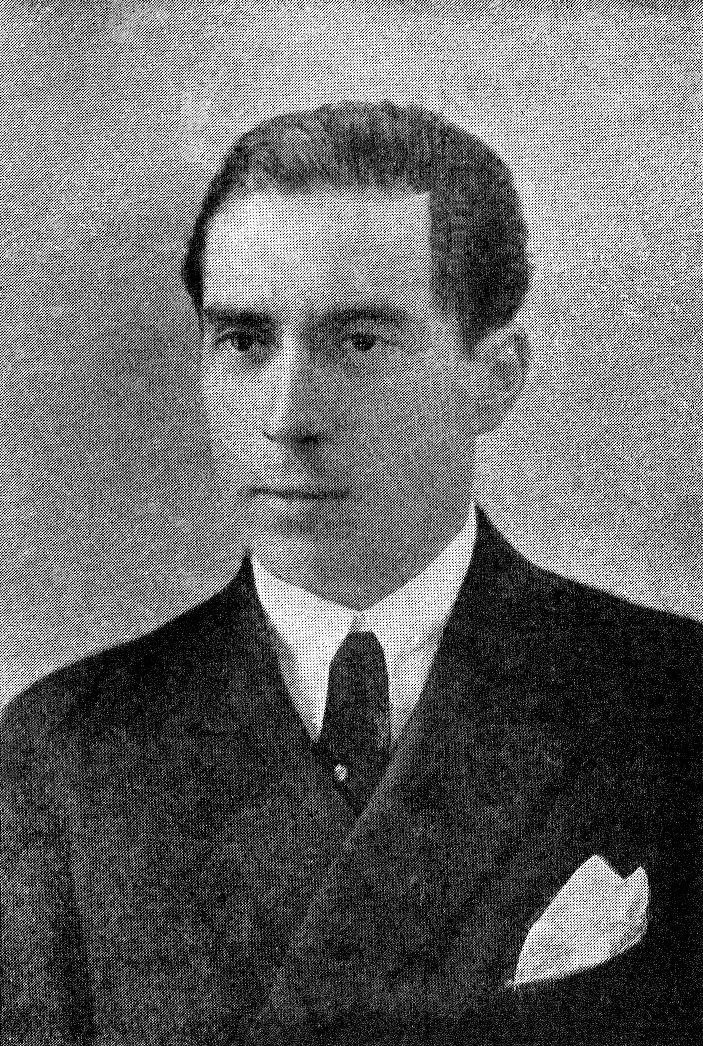
- Born: March 23, 1893; Santiago de Chile
- Died: September 5, 1964 (aged 71); Santiago de Chile
- Occupation: writer
- Known for: won Chilean National Prize for Literature, 1948

Angel Cruchaga Santa María (March 23, 1893 – September 5, 1964) was a Chilean writer. He won the Chilean National Prize for Literature in 1948.

== Works ==
- Cruchaga Santa Maria, Angel (1915). Las manos juntas (PDF). Santiago de Chile: Imprenta Universitaria.
- — (1920). La selva prometida. Paris, France.
- — (1922). Job: poema (PDF). Santiago de Chile: Grimm & Kern. LCCN 29020453. OCLC 15185938.
- — (1923). Los mástiles de Oro. Río Gallegos, Argentina.
- — (1926). Media noche. Santiago de Chile: Impr. Sociedad Boletín Comercial Salas & Cia.
- — (1928). Los cirios; La ciudad invisible; La hoguera abandonada: poemas. Santiago de Chile: Nascimento. LCCN 30005015.
- — (1933). Afán del corazón. Santiago de Chile: Imprenta Universitaria. LCCN 43044437.
- — (1939). Paso de sombra, poemas. Santiago de Chile: Nascimento. LCCN 42006301. OCLC 5056084.
- — (1946). Antología, selección y prologo de Pablo Neruda (PDF). Poetas de España y América. Buenos Aires: Editorial Losada. LCCN 47007842. OCLC 1628139.
- — (1953). Pequeña antología: selección del autor. Santiago de Chile: Escuela Nacional Artes Gráficas. LCCN 55020926.
- — (1955). Rostro de Chile. Santiago de Chile: Escuela Nacional Artes Gráficas. LCCN 59018961.
- — (1959). Anillo de jade: poemas de China (PDF). Santiago de Chile: Universitaria. LCCN 60040044.
- — (1963). Noches de las noches: poema, en prosa. Colección El viento en la llama. Vol. 6. Santiago de Chile: Arancibia. LCCN 65033701. OCLC 1202480.
- — (1996). Silva Acevedo, Manuel (ed.). La hora digna: antología poética. Colección Premios nacionales de literatura. Vol. 7. Santiago de Chile: Editorial Universitaria. LCCN 98199495.
