= Pedro Lastra =

Chilean poet and essayist

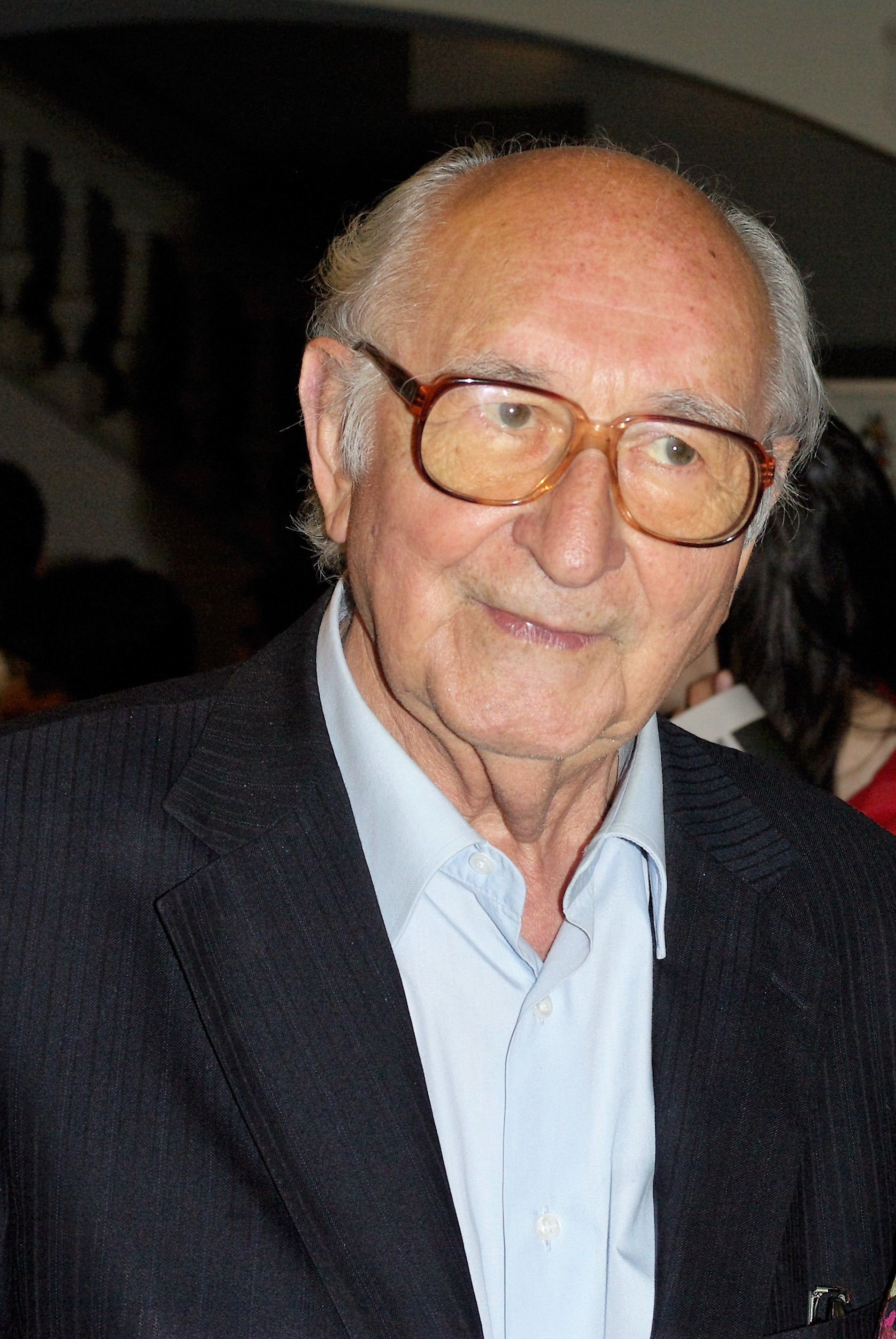
Chilean poet Pedro Lastra at the Puerto de Ideas 2016 festival, Valparaíso.

Pedro Lastra (born 3 March 1932) is a Chilean poet and essayist.

Lastra is a graduate of the University of Chile. Pedro Lastra first came to the U.S. as a visiting professor at SUNY Buffalo in the sixties after judging a short story competition in Cuba as part of his growing resume. There he would meet Julio Rodríguez-Puértolas, Universidad Autónoma de Madrid, emeritus, and Alan Francis, retired DOE/NYC, who later earned his doctorate from Harvard (1976), but who always mentions Pedro as an important influence in his career as Hispanist and jazz musician. They both were on the faculty of Stony Brook University during the seventies and performed jazz and poetry there. From 1966-73, he was the literary advisor to the University Press and director of the Letras de América collection. In 1972, he moved to the United States and taught at Stony Brook University in the Department of Hispanic Languages and Literature. In 1994, he became an emeritus professor there.

Lastra's works have been translated into English (by Elias Rivers) and into Greek. Juan Maria Solare put music to eleven of his poems.

== Bibliography ==
=== Poetry ===
- Traslado a la mañana (1959)
- Y éramos inmortales (1969, 1974)
- Cuaderno de la doble vida (1984)
- Diario de viaje y otros poemas (1998)
- Canción del pasajero (2001)
- Palabras de amor (2002).

=== Prose ===
- Conversaciones con Enrique Lihn (1980, 1990)
- Relecturas hispanoamericanas (1987)
- Invitación a la lectura (2001)
- Leido y anotado: Letras chilenas e hispanoamercianas (2002).
