= Andrés Sabella =

Chilean writer and cartoonist (1912–1989)

- Born: Andrés Expedito Florentino Sabella Gálvez; December 13, 1912; Antofagasta, Chile
- Died: August 26, 1989 (aged 76); Iquique, Chile
- Occupations: Journalist & poet
- Writing career
- Genre: Poetry

Andrés Sabella (1912–1989) was a Chilean writer, cartoonist, journalist and poet.

== Biography ==
Andrés Sabella's was born to Palestinian-Italian Andrés Sabella Signora, and Carmela Gálvez Tello. His mother died when he was six years old. He completed his primary and secondary education at the St. Aloysius College, Antofagasta where his classmate was Radomiro Tomic.

Sabella began writing at the age of 14. In 1929, he published Carcaj, Antofagasta's first poetic anthology. In the following year he published his first book titled, Rumbo indeciso.

== Works ==
- Rumbo indecisive (1930)
- Dirt (1934)
- Neighborhood pigeons (1941)
- Far North (1944)
- Chile, fertile province (1945)
- Centennial JK Huysmans (1949)
- Gala Martin (1952)
- The horse in my hand (1953)
- Songs for the sea to play with us (1964)
- A child over the sea (1972)
- Cell Christ. About The Bible A Hard Pan.
- The Star Man. (1972)
