= Carmen Morla Lynch =

Chilean writer

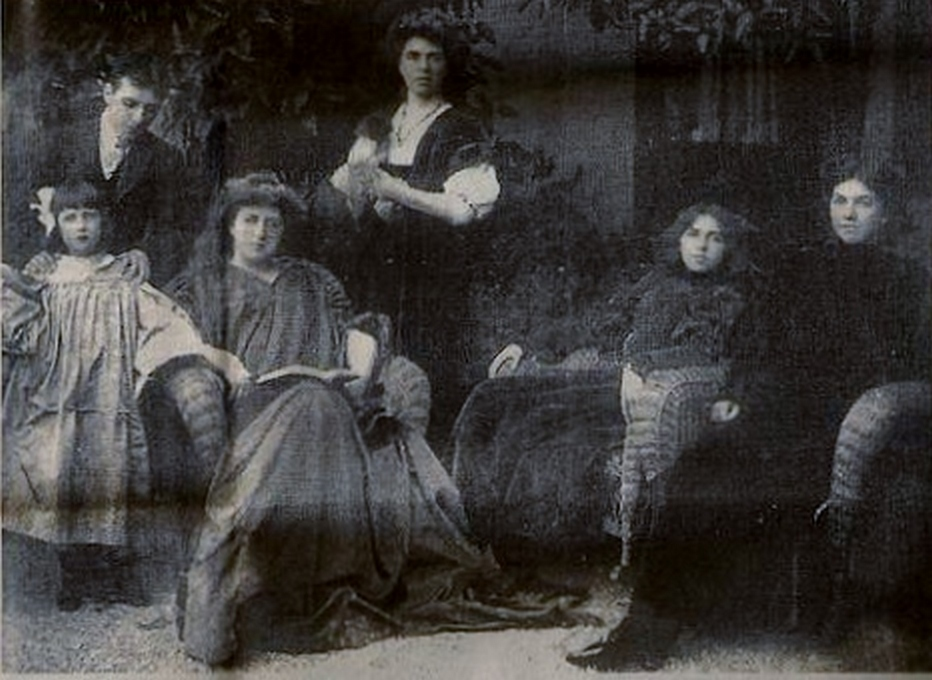
- Morla Lynch (standing center) with her mother and siblings, 1904
- Born: 1887; Paris, France
- Died: 1983 (aged 95–96); Santiago, Chile
- Other name: Carmen Morla de Maira
- Spouse: Manuel A. Maira González
- Children: Carmen
- Parents: Carlos Morla Vicuña (father); Luisa Lynch (mother)
- Relatives: Carlos (brother); Ximena (sister)

Carmen Morla Lynch (1887–1983), also known as Carmen Morla de Maira, was a Chilean feminist writer. The daughter of Luisa Lynch and Carlos Morla Vicuña, she wrote journals illustrated by her sister Ximena, with whom she also practiced spiritism, both as mediums. Her brother Carlos was a diplomat, writer, and journalist. She was the great-aunt of writer Elizabeth Subercaseaux.

== Work ==
Part of her literary output is known to be unpublished or scattered in newspapers and magazines – as is also the case with other feminist writers of the era such as her mother and sister, María Luisa Fernández, and Sara Hübner de Fresno. Some of her unpublished work appears in the 2001 book La belle époque chilena: alta sociedad y mujeres de élite en el cambio de siglo by historian Manuel Vicuña. Her literary contributions are considered to be part of the early 20th century avant-garde that sought to massify feminist thinking and fight for women's rights.

For some authors, her work can be framed within so-called "aristocratic feminism", along with other writers such as Elvira Santa Cruz Ossa, Blanca Santa Cruz Ossa, Inés Echeverría Bello, María Mercedes Vial, Teresa Wilms Montt, María Luisa Fernández, and Mariana Cox Méndez.

The spiritism sessions that she held with her sister Ximena in the early 20th century have inspired plays and novels.
