= 1914 in literature =

This article contains information about the literary events and publications of 1914.

== Events ==
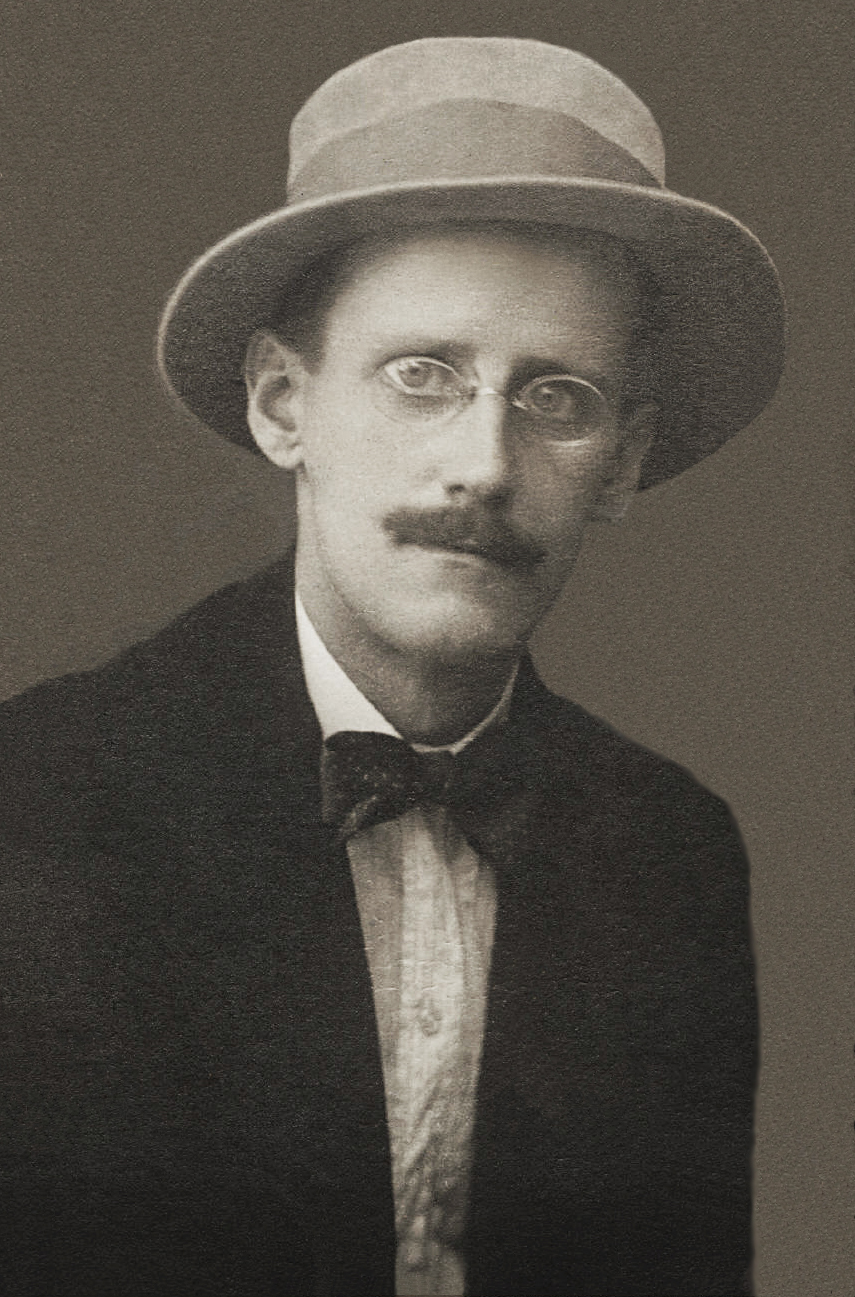
James Joyce in 1915

- January 18 – A party held in honour of English poet Wilfrid Scawen Blunt at his stud farm in West Sussex brings together W. B. Yeats, Ezra Pound, Thomas Sturge Moore, Victor Plarr, Richard Aldington, F. S. Flint and Frederic Manning. Peacock is on the menu.
- February 2 – James Joyce's semi-autobiographical novel A Portrait of the Artist as a Young Man commences serialization in The Egoist, a new London literary magazine founded by Dora Marsden.
- February 4 – A staging of George A. Birmingham's comedy General John Regan at Westport Town Hall in Ireland provokes a riot.
- February 10 – Thomas Hardy marries his second wife, the children's author Florence Dugdale, at St Andrew's, Enfield.
- March
  - The Times Literary Supplement is published separately for the first time (in London).
  - The Little Review is founded by Margaret Caroline Anderson as part of Chicago's literary renaissance.
- March 4 – Irish-born novelist George Moore publishes Vale, the final of his 3-volume autobiographical Hail and Farewell (first in 1911).
- March 4 (dated February) – Publication of the first issue of New Numbers, a quarterly collection of work by the Dymock poets in England edited by Lascelles Abercrombie with Wilfrid Gibson.
- April 11 – The first English-language performance of George Bernard Shaw's comedy Pygmalion at His Majesty's Theatre is given in London starring Mrs. Patrick Campbell and Herbert Beerbohm Tree, and famously including the Act III line "Not bloody likely!".
- June – James Joyce's Dubliners, a collection of fifteen short stories depicting the Irish middle classes in and around Dublin during the early 20th century, is published in London.
- June 20 – The first issue (of two) appears of the Vorticist literary magazine BLAST edited by Wyndham Lewis. It includes Ford Madox Hueffer's "The Saddest Story", a preliminary version of The Good Soldier.
- June 24 – Edward Thomas makes the English railway journey which inspires his poem "Adlestrop" while traveling to meet Robert Frost; Thomas begins writing poetry for the first time in December.
- July
  - E. M. Forster completes his novel Maurice, with its theme of male homosexual love; it is not published until 1971.
  - Heinrich Mann completes his novel Der Untertan, with its critique of German nationalism; it is not published until 1918.
- July 23 – Austro-Hungarian ultimatum includes demands that Serbia should suppress all publications which "incite hatred and contempt of the Austro-Hungarian monarchy", particularly schoolbooks.
- August
  - The literature of World War I makes its first appearance. John Masefield writes the poem "August, 1914" (published in the September 1 issue of The English Review), the last he will produce before the peace.
  - Stanley Unwin purchases a controlling interest in the London publisher George Allen.
  - At about this date Loughborough (England) publishers Wills & Hepworth publish their first illustrated children's books in the Ladybird series, Hans Andersen's Fairy Tales by E[thel] Talbot and Tiny Tots Travels by M. Burridge.
- August 3 – Siegfried Sassoon volunteers for military service, initially as a Trooper in the Sussex Yeomanry.
- August 25 – The library of the Catholic University of Leuven is set on fire by German troops during the Rape of Belgium.
- September – J. R. R. Tolkien writes a poem about Eärendil, the first appearance of his mythopoeic Middle-earth legendarium. Eärendil will much later appear in The Silmarillion. At this time Tolkien is an Oxford undergraduate staying at Phoenix Farm, Gedling, near Nottingham.
- September 2 – Charles Masterman invites 25 "eminent literary men" to Wellington House in London to form a secret British War Propaganda Bureau. Those who attend include William Archer, Arnold Bennett, Hall Caine, G. K. Chesterton, Arthur Conan Doyle, Ford Madox Hueffer, John Galsworthy, Thomas Hardy, Rudyard Kipling, John Masefield, Henry Newbolt, Gilbert Parker, G. M. Trevelyan and H. G. Wells. Kipling soon afterwards writes the poem "For all we have and are" and Hardy three days later writes the poem "Men Who March Away". W. B. Yeats, however, refuses to sign a letter of support for the War signed by most of the participants (with others) and published in The Times (London) on September 18.
- September 9 – Hilaire Belloc is contracted to write regular articles on the War in the new British weekly Land and Water.
- September 21 – Laurence Binyon's poem "For the Fallen", containing his "Ode of Remembrance", is published in The Times (London).
- September 22
  - French novelist Alain-Fournier (Lieutenant Henri-Alban Fournier), aged 27, is killed in action near Vaux-lès-Palameix (Meuse) a month after enlisting, leaving his second novel, Colombe Blanchet, unfinished; his body will not be identified until 1991.
  - T. S. Eliot (at this time in England to study) meets fellow American poet Ezra Pound for the first time, in London.
- September 29 – Arthur Machen's short story "The Bowmen", origin of the legend of the Angels of Mons, is published in The Evening News (London).
- October 2 – The date predicted by Charles Taze Russell, founder of the Watchtower Society (Jehovah's Witnesses), as the date for the "full end" of Babylon, or nominal Christianity, with statements such as: "True, it is expecting great things to claim, as we do, that within the coming twenty-six years all present governments will be overthrown and dissolved.... In view of this strong Bible evidence concerning the Times of the Gentiles, we consider it an established truth that the final end of the kingdoms of this world, and the full establishment of the Kingdom of God, will be accomplished at the end of A. D. 1914...."
- November 7 – The first issue of The New Republic magazine is published in the United States.
- November 16 – M. P. Shiel is convicted and imprisoned for "indecently assaulting and carnally knowing" his 12-year-old de facto stepdaughter on October 26 in London.
- December – Wilhelm Apollinaris de Kostrowitzky, who writes under the pen name "Guillaume Apollinaire", enlists in the French Army to fight in World War I and becomes a French citizen after an August attempt at enlistment is rejected.
- December 31 – T. S. Eliot writes to Conrad Aiken from Oxford (where he has a scholarship at Merton College), saying: "I hate university towns and university people, who are the same everywhere, with pregnant wives, sprawling children, many books and hideous pictures on the walls.... Oxford is very pretty, but I don't like to be dead."

== New books ==
=== Fiction ===
- Ion Agârbiceanu – Arhanghelii
- Arnold Bennett – The Price of Love
- E. F. Benson
  - Arundel
  - Dodo the Second (first British publication)
- Rhoda Broughton – Concerning a Vow
- Mary Grant Bruce
  - From Billabong to London
  - Grays Hollow
- G. K. Chesterton
  - The Flying Inn
  - The Wisdom of Father Brown (collected detective stories)
- Dikran Chökürian – Vanke (Վանքը, The Monastery)
- Marie Corelli – Innocent: Her Fancy and His Fact
- Miguel de Unamuno
  - Niebla (Mist, "nivola")
  - Vida de Don Quijote y Sancho (The Life of Don Quixote and Sancho or Our Lord Don Quixote)
- Ethel M. Dell – The Rocks of Valpré
- Theodore Dreiser – The Titan
- Edna Ferber – Personality Plus
- James Elroy Flecker – The King of Alsander
- Anatole France – La Révolte des anges (The Revolt of the Angels)
- André Gide – Les Caves du Vatican (The Cellars of the Vatican)
- Elinor Glyn – Letters to Caroline
- Nathaniel Gould – A Gamble for Love
- John MacDougall Hay – Gillespie
- Hermann Hesse – Rosshalde
- Frederic S. Isham – Nothing But the Truth
- James Joyce – Dubliners (short stories)
- D. H. Lawrence – The Prussian Officer and Other Stories
- Stephen Leacock – Arcadian Adventures with the Idle Rich
- Ada Leverson – Birds of Paradise
- Sinclair Lewis – Our Mr. Wrenn
- Harold MacGrath – The Adventures of Kathlyn
- Compton Mackenzie – Sinister Street, vol. 2
- Natsume Sōseki (夏目 漱石) – Kokoro (こころ)
- Frank Norris – Vandover and the Brute
- Baroness Orczy
  - The Laughing Cavalier
  - Unto Cæsar
- Gertrude Page – The Pathway
- Eleanor H. Porter – Miss Billy Married
- Raymond Roussel – Locus Solus
- Berta Ruck – His Official Fiancée
- Rafael Sabatini – The Gates of Doom
- Saki – Beasts and Super-Beasts
- Paul Scheerbart – Das graue Tuch und zehn Prozent Weiß: Ein Damenroman (The Gray Cloth with Ten Per cent White: A Ladies' Novel)
- Henri Stahl – Un român în lună
- Booth Tarkington – Penrod
- Robert Tressell (died 1911) – The Ragged-Trousered Philanthropists
- Mary Augusta Ward – Delia Blanchflower
- H. G. Wells
  - The Wife of Sir Isaac Harman
  - The World Set Free (originally serialised as A Prophetic Trilogy in Century Illustrated Monthly Magazine January–March)
- P. G. Wodehouse – The Man Upstairs (short story collection)
- Francis Brett Young – Deep Sea

=== Children and young people ===
- L. Frank Baum
  - Tik-Tok of Oz
  - Aunt Jane's Nieces Out West (as Edith Van Dyne)
- Edgar Rice Burroughs – Tarzan of the Apes (book publication)
- Elsie J. Oxenham – Girls of the Hamlet Club (first in the Abbey Series)
- Władysław Umiński – Czarodziejski okręt (The Magic Ship; serialization)

=== Drama ===
- Lascelles Abercrombie – The End of the World (September, Birmingham, England)
- Frank Craven – Too Many Cooks (February 24, New York)
- John Drinkwater – Rebellion
- Lord Dunsany – Five Plays (publication)
- Harley Granville-Barker – Vote By Ballot
- D. H. Lawrence – The Widowing of Mrs. Holroyd (publication, revised version)
- John Howard Lawson – Atmosphere
- Terence MacSwiney – The Revolutionist (publication)
- Roi Cooper Megrue and Walter Hackett – It Pays to Advertise
- Ramanbhai Neelkanth – Raino Parvat
- Elmer Rice – On Trial
- Edward Sheldon – The Song of Songs
- J. E. Harold Terry and Lechmere Worrall – The Man Who Stayed at Home (also The White Feather)
- E. Temple Thurston – The Evolution of Katherine
- Horace Annesley Vachell – Quinneys

=== Poetry ===
- Laurence Binyon – "For the Fallen" (including "Ode of Remembrance")
- Janus Djurhuus – Yrkingar
- Robert Frost – North of Boston (including "Mending Wall")
- Wilfrid Gibson – Borderlands and Thoroughfares
- Thomas Hardy – Satires of Circumstance (including "Poems 1912–13")
- Ernst Lissauer – Song of Hate against England (Hassgesang gegen England)
- Amy Lowell – Sword Blades and Poppy Seeds
- Gabriela Mistral – Los sonetos de la muerte (Sonnets of Death)
- Ezra Pound, ed. – Des Imagistes: An Anthology
- Ernst Stadler – Der Aufbruch (The Departure)
- Gertrude Stein – Tender Buttons
- Wallace Stevens – Phases
- Katharine Tynan – The Flower of Peace

=== Non-fiction ===
- Clive Bell – Art
- Arnold Bennett – Liberty: A Statement of the British Case
- Hall Caine – King Albert's Book
- G. K. Chesterton – The Barbarism of Berlin
- Henry James – Notes of a Son and Brother
- Chrystal Macmillan – "Facts versus Fancies on Woman Suffrage" (pamphlet)
- Henry S. Salt – The Humanities of Diet
- Paul Scheerbart – Glasarchitektur (Glass Architecture)
- George Bernard Shaw
  - The Case for Belgium
  - Common Sense About The War
- Edward Thomas – In Pursuit of Spring
- H. G. Wells – The War That Will End War (collected articles)

== Births ==
- January 2 – Vivian Stuart (aka Alex Stuart, Barbara Allen, Fiona Finlay, V. A. Stuart, William Stuart Long, Robyn Stuart), British writer (died 1986)
- January 8 – Norman Nicholson, English poet (died 1987)
- January 15 – Etty Hillesum, Dutch correspondent, diarist and Holocaust victim (died 1943)
- January 17 – William Stafford, American poet, pacifist (died 1993)
- January 26 – Kaye Webb, English publisher and journalist (died 1996)
- February 4 – Alfred Andersch, German writer (died 1980)
- February 5 – William S. Burroughs, American author (died 1997)
- February 6 – Arkadi Kuleshov, Soviet poet and translator (died 1978)
- February 13 – Katarína Lazarová, Slovak novelist and translator (died 1995)
- February 25 – Frank Bonham, American novelist (died 1988)
- March 1 – Ralph Ellison, American scholar and writer (died 1994)
- March 4 – Barbara Newhall Follett, American prodigy novelist (went missing in December 1939)
- March 27 – Budd Schulberg, American writer (died 2009)
- March 28 – Bohumil Hrabal, Czech poet and controversialist (died 1997)
- March 31 – Octavio Paz, Nobel Prize winning Mexican author (died 1998)
- April 4 – Marguerite Duras, French writer (died 1996)
- April 10 – Maria Banuș, Romanian poet and translator (died 1999)
- April 25 – Ross Lockridge Jr., American novelist (died 1948)
- April 26 – Bernard Malamud, American novelist (died 1986)
- April 28 – Michel Mohrt, French author and historian (died 2011)
- May 3
  - Georges-Emmanuel Clancier, French poet (died 2018)
  - Martín de Riquer, Spanish writer and Romantic scholar (died 2013)
- May 6 – Randall Jarrell, American poet (died 1965)
- May 8 – Romain Gary, Lithuanian-born French novelist (died 1980)
- May 12 – James Bacon, author and journalist (died 2010)
- May 14 – Anne Baker, British writer (died 2025)
- June 15 – Lena Kennedy, English novelist (died 1986)
- June 17 – Julián Marías, Spanish philosopher and author (died 2005)
- June 26 – Laurie Lee, English poet and memoirist (died 1997)
- July 14
  - Wim Hora Adema, Dutch children's author and feminist (died 1998)
  - Béatrix Beck, French writer of Belgian origin (died 2008)
- July 15
  - Hammond Innes, English adventure novelist (died 1998)
  - Gavin Maxwell, Scottish naturalist and author (died 1969)
- July 17
  - Alice Gore King, American entrepreneur, educator, writer and artist (died 2007)
  - James Purdy, American novelist, short story writer, poet and playwright (died 2009)
- July 18 – Roy Huggins, American novelist (died 2002)
- July 23 – Alf Prøysen, Norwegian author, musician and children's writer (died 1970)
- July 25 – Winifred Foley, English memoirist (died 2009)
- August 5 – Anthony West, English author and critic, son of 'Rebecca West' and H. G. Wells (died 1987)
- August 9 – Tove Jansson, Finnish children's author (died 2001)
- August 20 – Colin MacInnes, English novelist (died 1976)
- August 21 – Stephen Coulter, British novelist (died 1986)
- August 26 – Julio Cortázar, Argentine author (died 1984)
- September 5
  - Nicanor Parra, Chilean poet and physicist (died 2018)
  - Gogu Rădulescu, Romanian communist politician, journalist, and patron of the arts (died 1991)
- September 15 – Adolfo Bioy Casares, Argentine author (died 1999)
- October 1 – Hilda Ellis Davidson, English antiquarian and academic (died 2006)
- October 6 – Joan Littlewood, English theatre director and biographer (died 2002)
- October 20 – L. P. Davies, English novelist (died 1988)
- October 26 – John Masters, British Raj novelist (died 1983)
- October 27 – Dylan Thomas, Welsh poet and author (died 1953)
- November 22 – Leah Bodine Drake, American poet (died 1964)
- December 12 – Patrick O'Brian (Richard Patrick Russ), English historical novelist (died 2000)
- December 14 – Diana Forbes-Robertson, English writer and biographer (died 1987)
- December 24 – Herbert Reinecker, German novelist and playwright (died 2007)

== Deaths ==
- January 6 – Henrietta Keddie (Sarah Tytler), Scottish novelist and children's writer (born 1827)
- February 1 – Marie Robinson Wright, American travel writer (born 1853)
- February 15 – Kate Brownlee Sherwood, American poet, journalist, translator, and story writer (born 1841)
- February 25 – John Tenniel, English cartoonist and illustrator (born 1820)
- March – Evelyn Magruder DeJarnette, American short story writer (born 1842)
- March 17 – Hiraide Shū (平出 修), Japanese novelist, poet, and lawyer (born 1878)
- March 19 – Thomas Cooper de Leon, American journalist, author and playwright (born 1839)
- March 25 – Frédéric Mistral, Nobel Prize winning French author (born 1830)
- March 28 - Hjalmar Bergström, Danish playwright, novelist, and short story writer (born 1868)
- March 31 – Christian Morgenstern, German poet and writer (born 1871)
- April 2 – Paul Heyse, Nobel Prize winning German author (born 1830)
- April 7 – Edith Maude Eaton (Sui Sin Far, 水仙花), English-born writer on Chinese (born 1865)
- May 13 – Isabella Fyvie Mayo, British poet and novelist born 1843)
- May 19 – William Aldis Wright, English writer and editor (born 1831)
- May 29 – Laurence Irving, English dramatist and novelist (drowned, born 1871)
- June 3 – Danske Dandridge, Danish-born American poet, historian, and garden writer (b. 1854)
- June 6 – Theodore Watts-Dunton, English critic and poet (born 1832)
- June 19 – Brandon Thomas, British actor and playwright (Charley's Aunt) (born 1848)
- June 21 – Bertha von Suttner, Austrian pacifist writer (born 1843)
- July 6 – Delmira Agustini, Uruguayan poet (murdered; born 1886)
- July 23 – Charlotte Forten Grimké, African American poet (born 1837)
- September 4 – Charles Péguy, French poet and essayist (killed in action, born 1873)
- September 8
  - Mariana Cox Méndez, Chilean writer (born 1871)
  - Hans Leybold, German nihilist poet (born 1892)
- September 11 – Mircea Demetriade, Romanian poet and actor (born 1861)
- September 22 – Alain-Fournier, French novelist (killed in action, born 1886)
- September 25 – Alfred Lichtenstein, German Expressionist writer (killed in action, born 1889)
- October 9 – Dumitru C. Moruzi, Russian-born Romanian political figure and social novelist (asthma; born 1850)
- October 30 – Ernst Stadler, German Expressionist poet (killed in action, born 1883)
- November 3 – Georg Trakl, Austrian Expressionist poet (cocaine overdose, born 1887)
- November 9 – Alessandro d'Ancona, Italian critic and writer (born 1835)
- November 12 – Augusto dos Anjos, Brazilian poet (b. 1884)
- November 16 – Nikolai Chayev, Russian writer, poet and playwright (born 1824)
- November 19 – Robert Jones Burdette, American minister and sentimental humorist (born 1844)

== Awards ==
- Newdigate Prize: Robert William Sterling, "The Burial of Sophocles"
- Nobel Prize for Literature: not awarded
- Prix Goncourt: Adrien Bertrand, L'Appel du Sol

== See also ==
- World War I in literature
