= Luisa Lynch =

Chilean writer, journalist and socialite (1864–1937)

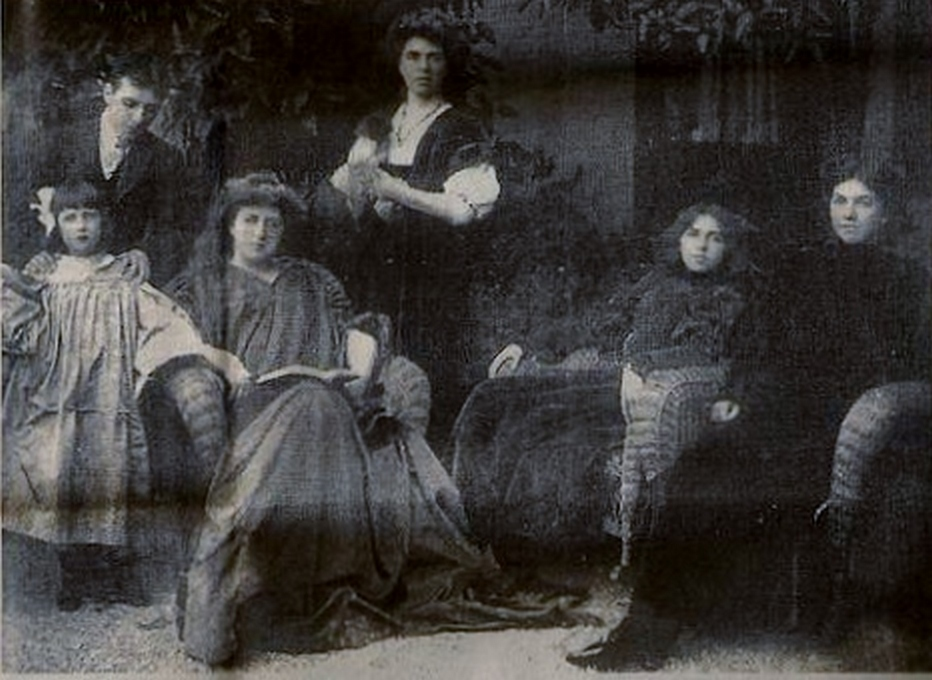
- Lynch (seated left) with her children, 1904
- Born: Luisa Lynch del Solar; 1864; Chile
- Died: 1937 (aged 72–73); Chile
- Other names: Luisa Lynch de Morla; Luisa Lynch de Gormaz
- Occupations: Writer; journalist; socialite
- Spouses: Carlos Morla Vicuña (died); Eduardo Gormaz Araoz
- Children: 6, including: Ximena Morla Lynch; Carmen Morla Lynch
- Writing career
- Subject: Feminism

Luisa Lynch del Solar (married name de Morla, later de Gormaz; 1864–1937) was a Chilean feminist writer, journalist, and socialite. Part of her literary output is known to be unpublished or scattered in newspapers and magazines – as is also the case with other feminist writers such as María Luisa Fernández, Sara Hübner de Fresno, and her own daughters. Her literary work is considered to be part of the early 20th century avant-garde that sought to massify feminist thinking and fight for women's rights. In this context, she participated in various women's organizations and institutions dedicated to art.

For some authors, her work can be framed within so-called "aristocratic feminism", along with other writers such as Elvira Santa Cruz Ossa, Inés Echeverría Bello, María Mercedes Vial, Teresa Wilms Montt, Mariana Cox Méndez, and Sofía Eastman.

== Personal life ==
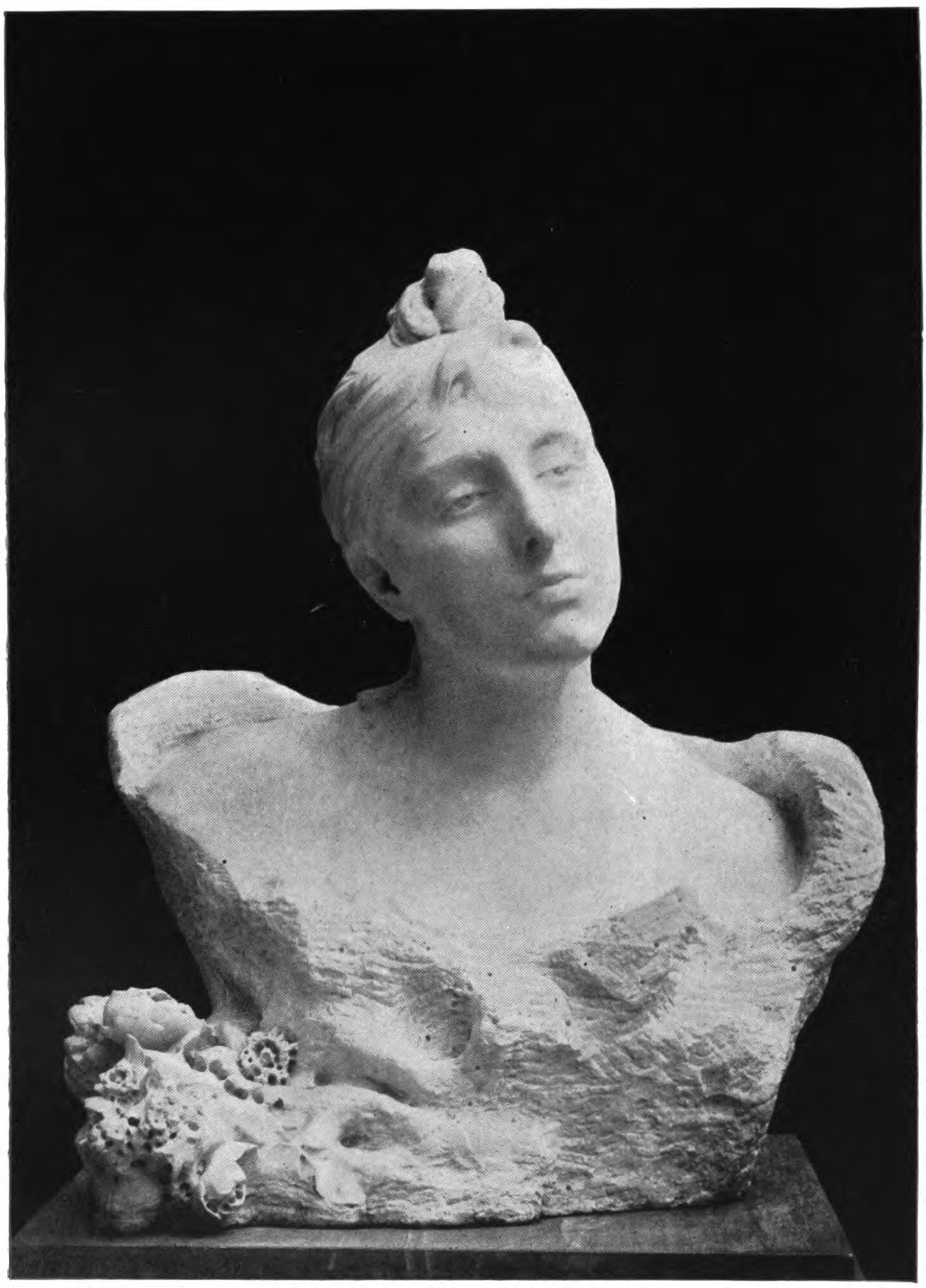
Bust of Luisa Lynch by Auguste Rodin (1888)

Lynch was first married to Carlos Morla Vicuña, with whom she had 6 children. The couple's children included the diplomat Carlos Morla Lynch, the feminist writers Ximena and Carmen Morla Lynch. Following Morla's death, Lynch later married Eduardo Gormaz Araoz.

Lynch is the subject of the 1888 sculpture Madame Morla Vicuña by Auguste Rodin, which can now be found at the Musée d'Orsay in Paris.
