= Ximena Morla Lynch =

Chilean feminist writer and painter

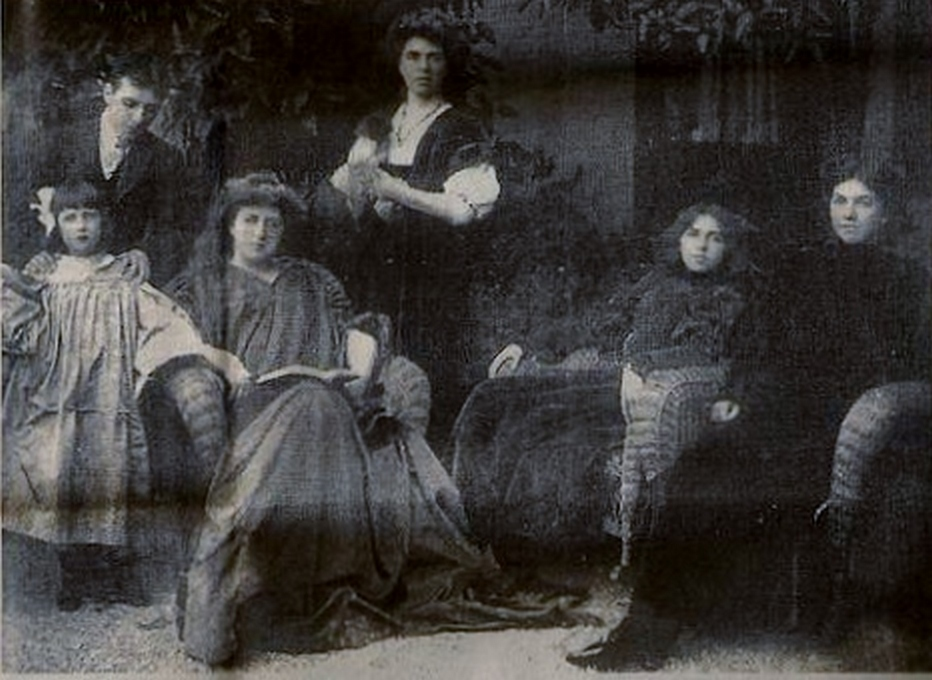
- Morla Lynch (seated second from right) with her mother and siblings, 1904
- Born: 1891; Paris, France
- Died: 1987 (aged 95–96); Santiago, Chile
- Other name: Ximena Morla de Subercaseaux
- Occupations: Writer, painter
- Spouse: Juan Eduardo Subercaseaux
- Parents: Carlos Morla Vicuña (father); Luisa Lynch (mother)
- Relatives: Carlos Morla Lynch (brother); Carmen Morla Lynch (sister)

Ximena Morla Lynch (married name Ximena Morla de Subercaseaux; 1891–1987) was a Chilean feminist writer and painter.

== Early life ==
Morla was born in 1891 (Note: Also cited as 1892.) in Paris (Note: Also cited as Santiago, Chile.) to Carlos Morla Vicuña, a politician, and Luisa Lynch, a writer. The fifth of six siblings, Morla was the younger sister of Carlos Morla Lynch, a diplomat, and Carmen Morla Lynch, a writer.

== Work ==
Part of her literary output is known to be unpublished or scattered in newspapers and magazines – as is also the case with other feminist writers of the era such as her mother and sister, María Luisa Fernández, and Sara Hübner de Fresno. Her literary work is considered to be part of the early 20th century avant-garde that sought to massify feminist thinking and fight for women's rights.

For some authors, her work can be framed within so-called "aristocratic feminism", along with other writers such as Elvira Santa Cruz Ossa, Blanca Santa Cruz Ossa, Inés Echeverría Bello, María Mercedes Vial, Teresa Wilms Montt, María Luisa Fernández, and Mariana Cox Méndez.

The spiritism sessions that she held with her sister Carmen in the early 20th century have inspired plays and novels. In Grupo 7, – the Morlas' esoteric circle to which painter María Tupper (1893–1965) also belonged – Ximena was the main medium, although her sister Carmen also functioned as such. Her astral name was Vera, her sister's was Nakinko, her mother's was Asiul, and Tupper's was Cirineo.

As a painter, she made portraits in oil on canvas. She was also an "illustrator and creator of imaginative compositions of native style."

== Painting exhibitions ==
=== Individual ===
- 1977: Municipality of Zapallar, Zapallar, Chile

=== Group ===
- 1915: Exposición Anual de Bellas Artes, Salón Oficial, Santiago
- 1927: Exposición de Bellas Artes, Salón Oficial, Santiago
- 1936: Exposición Nacional de Artes Plásticas de Valparaíso
- 1963: Salón Oficial de Artes Plásticas, Santiago
- 1975: La Mujer en el Arte, Museo Nacional de Bellas artes, Santiago

== Personal life and family ==
Her granddaughter is the novelist Elizabeth Subercaseaux.
