= Sofía Eastman =

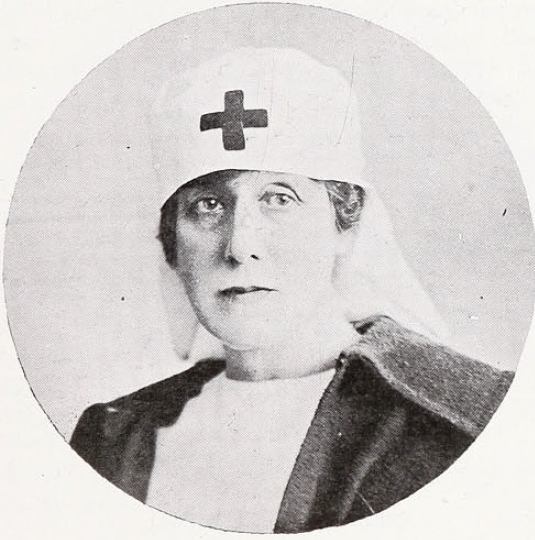
- Born: Sofía Eastman Cox; 27 January 1873; Valparaíso, Chile
- Died: 26 August 1944 (aged 71); Valparaíso, Chile
- Other name: Sofía Eastman de Huneeus
- Occupation: Writer
- Spouse: Roberto Huneeus Gana
- Children: Roberto, Aníbal, Pedro, Tomás

Sofía Eastman Cox (married name Eastman de Huneeus; 27 January 1873 – 26 August 1944) was a Chilean feminist writer and socialite. In 1915, she was a founder and president of the Ladies' Reading Circle, one of the first women's groups in Chile, dedicated "to promote and cultivate letters and the arts from the point of view of reception and production, and to improve the quality of education received by women." She also held the presidency of the Chilean Women's Red Cross from 1918 to 1921, an institution of which she was also one of the main benefactors and managers.

Eastman wrote mainly in newspapers and magazines in the early 20th century, and her poems appeared in several anthologies, including Amalia Errázuriz de Subercaseaux. For some authors, her work can be framed within so-called "aristocratic feminism", along with other writers such as Inés Echeverría Bello, María Mercedes Vial, Teresa Wilms Montt, Mariana Cox Méndez, and Luisa Lynch.

== Works ==
- Memoria de la Cruz Roja de Mujeres de Chile (1922)

=== Anthologies ===
- Amalia Errázuriz de Subercaseaux (1946)
