= The Gray Cloth =

1914 novel by Paul Scheerbart

The Gray Cloth with Ten Percent White: A Ladies' Novel (in German, Das graue Tuch und zehn Prozent Weiß: Ein Damenroman) is an avant-garde novel by the fantasist and visionary writer Paul Scheerbart, first published in 1914. The book expresses its author's commitment to the use of glass in modern architecture, which had a significant impact on the concepts of German Expressionism.

== Glass architecture ==
Scheerbart had advocated a transformative new architecture of glass from his first novel, Das Paradies, through many subsequent works. In 1913 he attempted to organize a "Society for Glass Architecture," an effort that brought him into contact with the Expressionist Bruno Taut. In the following year Scheerbart published not one but two books on the subject: his non-fictional Glass Architecture made the case for its subject in a more rational and pragmatic basis, while The Gray Cloth provided a far more imaginative and lavish presentation of the same matter.

== Plot summary ==
The novel is set in the middle of the twentieth century, and opens in Chicago, where the protagonist Edgar Krug has designed an enormous colored-glass exhibition hall. An art exhibit is held there, accompanied by an organ concert. Krug, fiercely dedicated to his esthetic concepts, is unhappy that the bright colors of women's fashions clash with his architectural scheme. When he meets Clara Weber, the organist, he is struck by her gray dress with white lace trim; he finds it the perfect complement to the color effect of his hall. Krug impulsively asks Clara to marry him — providing she agrees to wear the same style of clothing. Clara accepts Krug's terms, which are specified in their marriage contract. Once married, the couple leave for the Fiji Islands in Krug's private dirigible (it has a glass-walled cupola, and air conditioning).

Though Clara accepts Krug's strange terms for their marriage, other women do not. Clara maintains a telegraphic correspondence with her American friend, Amanda Schmidt; and Amanda is highly critical of Clara's subservience in the arrangement. Later in the book, other women also protest its terms. Scheerbart provides portrayals of a number of strong female characters through the book, supporting its subtitle, "a Ladies' novel."

Krug goes to Fiji because he has an ongoing project there, a retirement home for airship pilots. He clashes with the project's sponsor over how much colored glass the building will accommodate. From Fiji, Krug and Clara travel to other sites throughout the world, to visit other projects.

Their first stop is "Makartland" at the South Pole, an artists' colony for twenty women artists. There, a seamstress makes outfits for Clara that arrange her gray-and-white wardrobe scheme in imaginative ways. Käte Bandel, one of the artists, joins the Krugs in their further travels; she debates artistic assumptions and values with Krug as they travel to Australia and then to Borneo. Bandel enrages Krug when she convinces Clara to wear a plaid scarf.

Leaving Bandel behind, they fly to Japan; but Japanese women also react negatively to the gray and white. In the Himalayas and in Ceylon, Krug visits another projects; later the couple travel to an experimental station by the Aral Sea. They also visit Babylon and Egypt. Despite his enthusiasm for colored glass, Krug turns down an offer to build large glass obelisks atop the Pyramids of Giza. In the "Kurian Murian Islands" off the eastern coast of Arabia, Krug meets the tycoon Li-Tung, who commissions him to design houses suspended in mid-air (so that they don't scratch the majolica tiles with which the islands are paved). Li-Tung is passionate about color, and has Clara change into more varied silk outfits. Krug allows this.

Their journey is not a parade of triumphs, however; in most places, Krug's ideas are resisted, criticized, and rejected to greater or lesser degrees. At Malta, though, a glass architecture museum in established. The Krugs end the novel at their glass house in Switzerland.

At Babylon, Krug gives up on his determination about Clara's wardrobe, and agrees to strike the binding clause out of their marriage contract. By this time, though, Clara has become a convert to her husband's ideas about glass architecture, and maintains the gray fashion by her own choice.

== Impact ==
Scheerbart certainly influenced Bruno Taut's Glass Pavilion at the 1914 Werkbund Exhibition — the first, last, and only design of German Expressionist glass architecture that was actually constructed. Taut inscribed the fourteen sides of the structure with fourteen quotations from Scheerbart's works. Scheerbart's writings also influenced Carl Krayl, Wenzel Hablik, and other members of the Glass Chain group.

It is an open question how much influence the German Expressionists' work had on the glass skyscrapers of Ludwig Mies van der Rohe and other Modernist architects later in the century. The modernists rejected Scheerbart's strong emphasis on the use of colored glass. In one view, though, the modernist glass skyscrapers of the mid-twentieth century "came closer to realizing Scheerbart's vision than the utopian projects of Taut and other Expressionist architects."

== Genre ==
The Gray Cloth, like other Scheerbart works, is a challenge to classification. It can be termed a fantasy, though it also shares some characteristics of science fiction (a temporal setting in the future, and advanced technology).

== English edition ==
Chronologically, The Gray Cloth is the last of Scheerbart's novels; but it is also the first to receive an English translation.

== See also ==
- Lesabéndio, another novel by Scheerbart
