= Henriette Morvan =

Chilean journalist, writer, and editor

- Born: Enriqueta Peptitpas Cotton; 1900; Santiago, Chile
- Other names: Damita Duende
- Occupation(s): Journalist, writer, editor
- Children: Martha Morvan Petitpas; Nora Morvan Petitpas

Enriqueta Peptitpas Cotton (born 1900; year of death unknown), better known as Henriette Morvan or Damita Duende, was a Chilean journalist, writer, and editor. Associated with the genres of children's and young adult literature, she wrote and compiled related stories.

== Career ==
Beginning in the 1930s, children's literature became prominent in Chile. In this context, Henriette Morvan established herself as one of the leaders of the genre, with publications such as Doce cuentos de príncipes y reyes and Doce cuentos de hadas, both from 1938. She was linked to other authors of the time, such as Ernesto Montenegro with his 1930 work Cuentos de mi Tío Ventura, Blanca Santa Cruz Ossa with her compilations of myths and legends (beginning in 1929), and Marta Brunet with Cuentos para Marisol (also published in 1938).

Together with Blanca Santa Cruz Ossa and her sister Elvira, Morvan was one of the main collectors and disseminators of children's literature in Chile in the late 1930s and 1940s. In addition, her work is included in a group of authors "whose main concern was to educate by more didactic methods," among whom was Ester Cosani. In the late 1930s she began a series of contributions to the magazine Zig-Zag as part of a collection titled "Damita Duente" – her pseudonym from then on – which included a compilation of legends and fables.

She edited several magazines, such as Campeón (1937) and El Cabrito (1945). In addition, she wrote for various publications in the United States, Mexico, and Cuba.

== Works ==
- Manual de cocina (1938)
- Sume: Leyenda brasileña (1939)
- El héroe de Lepanto (1948, essay)
- Boomerang (1957, novel)
- La Cenicienta: cuento de Grimm (own version, Editorial Zig-Zag, 1943)
- Cuentos para ti, Nena (Editorial Zig-Zag, 1941)
- El mago de Oz: versión autorizada y basada en la película de la Metro-Goldwyn-Mayer (Editorial Zig-Zag, 1940)
- El libro de las doce leyendas (Editorial Zig-Zag, 1940)
- Cuentos infantiles en verso (Editorial Zig-Zag, 1939)
- Los doce milagros (Editorial Zig-Zag, 1939)
- El milagro de los ojos (Editorial Zig-Zag, 1938)
- Blanca nieves y los siete enanitos ("Cinesca" version; Editorial Zig-Zag, 1938)
- El libro de las doce leyendas (Editorial Zig-Zag, 1937)

=== Doce Cuentos series ===
- Doce cuentos de príncipes y reyes (Editorial Zig-Zag, 1938)
- Doce cuentos de hadas (1938)
- Doce Cuentos de Gigantes y enanos (Editorial Zig-Zag, 1939)
- Doce cuentos de Navidad (Editorial Zig-Zag, 1939)
- Doce Cuentos de encantamiento (Editorial Zig-Zag, 1939)
- Doce Cuentos de la abuela (Editorial Zig-Zag, 1938)
- Doce cuentos de oro y plata (Editorial Zig-Zag, 1938)
- Doce Cuentos del mar (Editorial Zig-Zag, 1938)
- Doce Cuentos de animales (Editorial Zig-Zag, 1940)
- Doce Cuentos de juguetes (Editorial Zig-Zag, 1943)
- Doce cuentos de recreo y deportes (Editorial Zig-Zag, 1944)
