= Hjalmar Bergström =

Hjalmar Bergström may refer to:

- Hjalmar Bergström (skier)
- Hjalmar Bergström (writer)

== See also ==
- Hjalmar Borgstrøm, Norwegian composer and music critic
