= María Luisa Fernández (writer) =

- Born: María Luisa Fernández Bascuñán; 1870; Chile
- Died: 1938 (aged 67–68); Chile
- Other names: María Luisa Fernández de García Huidobro; Monna Lissa
- Occupations: Writer, editor
- Spouse: Vicente García Huidobro
- Children: Vicente Huidobro

María Luisa Fernández Bascuñán (1870–1938), also known as María Luisa Fernández de García Huidobro and by the literary pseudonym Monna Lissa, was a Chilean feminist writer, editor, and poet. She was the mother of poet Vicente Huidobro (1893–1948).

== Career ==
María Luisa Fernández wrote novels and religious poetry, and edited feminist magazines, such as that of the Chilean Women's Patriotic Union – a group she organized – and Aliada (1922).

Part of her literary output is known to be unpublished or scattered in newspapers and magazines – as is also the case with other feminist writers such as Luisa Lynch, Sara Hübner de Fresno, and the sisters Ximena and Carmen Morla Lynch. Her literary work is considered to be part of the early 20th century avant-garde that sought to massify feminist thinking and fight for women's rights.

For some authors, her work can be framed within so-called "aristocratic feminism", along with other writers such as Inés Echeverría Bello, María Mercedes Vial, Teresa Wilms Montt, the sisters Morla Lynch, and Mariana Cox Méndez.

== Works ==
- Oraciones de mi madre para mis hijos (Santiago: Imprenta y encuadernación Chile, 1905)
- Vida de la santísima Virgen María, madre de Dios (Santiago: Impr. Chile, 1935)
- María del Carmen (novel, Santiago: Impr. Claret, 1930)
