= Sara Hübner de Fresno =

Chilean feminist writer, journalist, and editor

- Born: Sofía Sara Hübner Bezanilla; 18 December 1888; Santiago, Chile
- Died: Chile
- Occupations: Writer, journalist, editor
- Spouse: Enrique Fresno Ingunza (m. 1929)
- Writing career
- Pen name: Magda Sudermann

Sofía Sara Hübner de Fresno (née Hübner Bezanilla; born 18 December 1888), also known by the pseudonym Magda Sudermann, was a Chilean feminist writer, journalist, and editor.

== Biography ==
The daughter of the writer Carlos Luis Hübner and Teresa Bezanilla, Sara Hübner de Fresno wrote for newspapers and magazines, including Zig-Zag, Sucesos, and Artes y letras. She also edited the Women's Page section of the periodical Las Últimas Noticias in the early 20th century.

Part of her literary output is known to be unpublished or scattered in newspapers and magazines – as is also the case with other feminist writers such as Luisa Lynch, María Luisa Fernández, and the sisters Ximena and Carmen Morla Lynch. Her literary work is considered to be part of the early 20th century avant-garde that sought to increase feminist thinking and fight for women's rights. However some of her writings express feelings of contempt toward the Mapuche people.

She married Enrique Fresno Ingunza in 1929.

== Works ==
- "Del diario íntimo de Magda Suddermann" in Revista de artes y letras (Santiago: Ediciones de Artes y Letras, 1918)
- "Nunca" in Hablemos de amor: Gran selección de poemas románticos de los genios del amor (1960)
