= Paul Scheerbart =

German author (1863–1915)

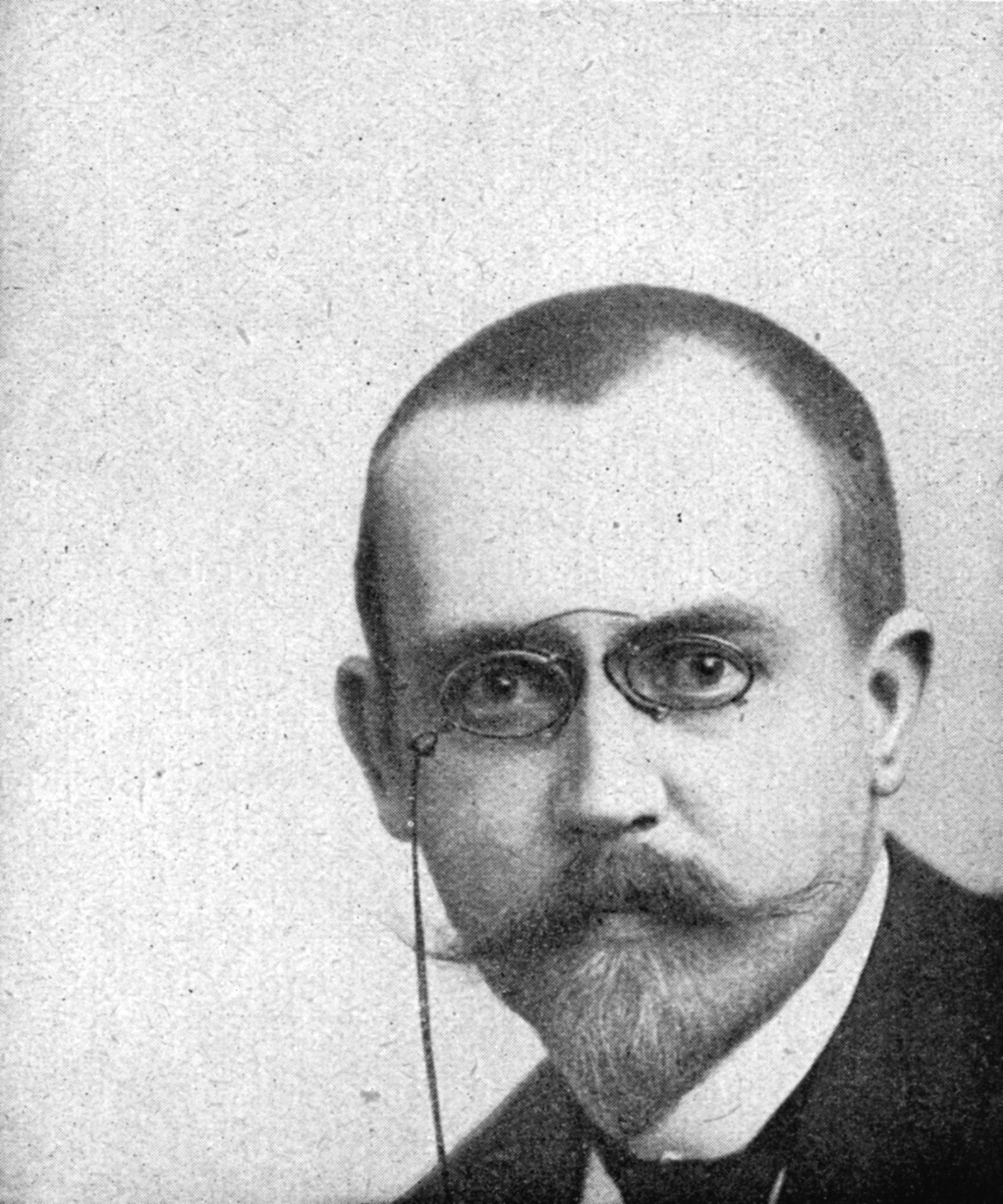
- Born: January 8, 1863
- Died: October 15, 1915 (aged 52)
- Occupations: Speculative fiction literature, drawings
- Writing career
- Language: German

Paul Karl Wilhelm Scheerbart (8 January 1863, Danzig – 15 October 1915, Berlin) was a German author of speculative fiction literature and drawings. He was also published under the pseudonym Kuno Küfer and is best known for the book Glasarchitektur (1914).

Scheerbart was associated with expressionist architecture and one of its leading proponents, Bruno Taut. He composed aphoristic poems about glass for Taut's Glass Pavilion at the Werkbund Exhibition (1914).

== Life ==
Paul Scheerbart began studies of philosophy and history of art in 1885. In 1887 he worked as a poet in Berlin and tried to invent perpetual motion machines. In 1892 he was one of the joint founders of the Verlag deutscher Phantasten (Publishers of German Fantasists).

At this time he was in financial difficulties. After writing in different publications he produced his first novel Die große Revolution (The Great Revolution), which was published by the Insel Verlag. The young Ernst Rowohlt published Scheerbart's bizarre poem collection Katerpoesie and became his friend.

Scheerbart's fantasy essays about glass architecture influenced architects at that time, including the young Bruno Taut. Among his Berlin friends and drinking circle was Erich Mühsam, who dedicated a chapter to Scheerbart in his 'Unpolitical Memories' and Richard Dehmel. Scheerbart was also an important influence on Walter Benjamin who quoted his ideas on glass in his Arcades Project.

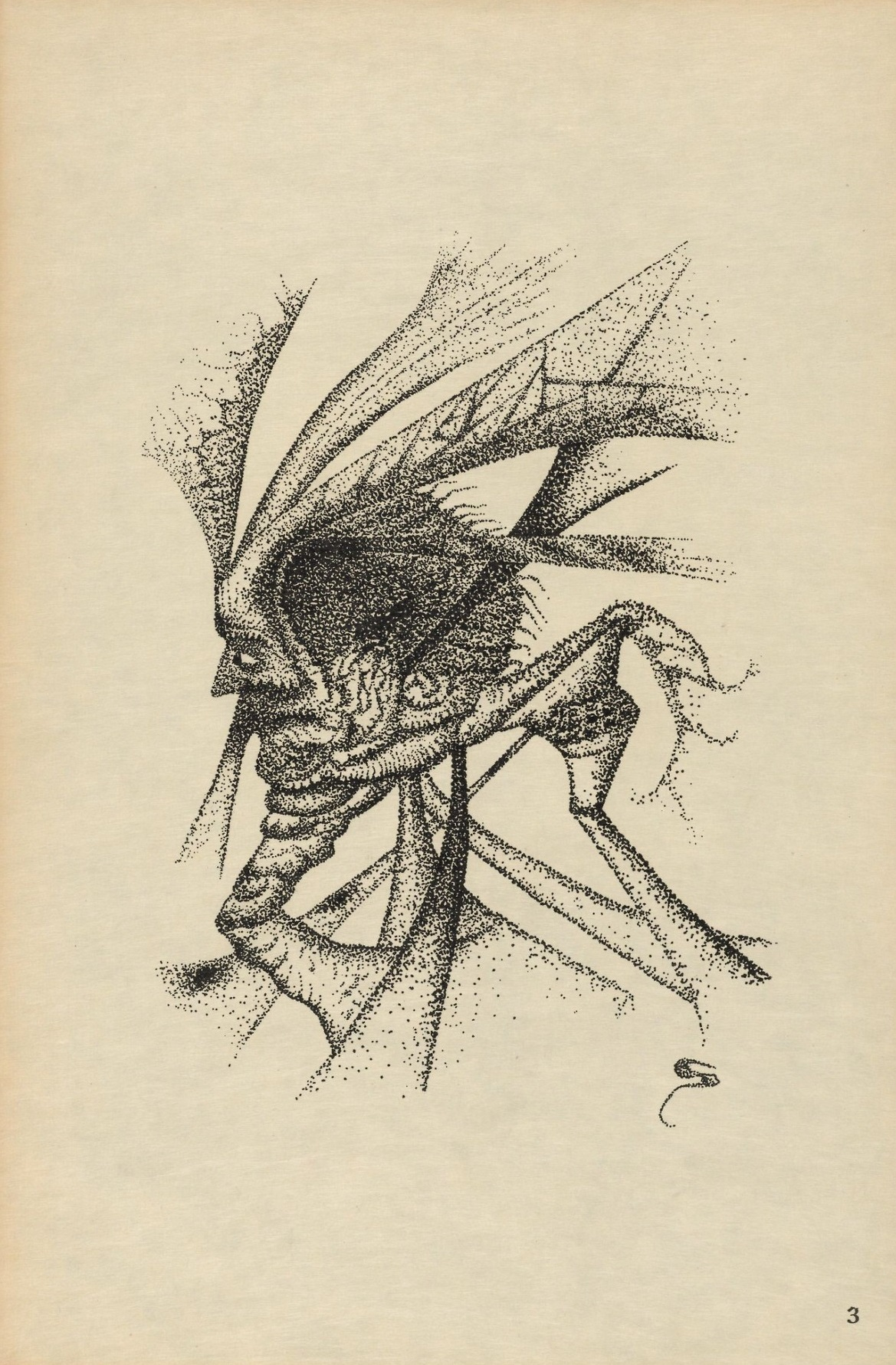
Illustration from Jenseits-Galerie, 1907

== Works ==
Very few of Scheerbart's works have been translated into English. Though the following list also gives English translations of the titles, there is usually no English-language edition of the work available.

- 1889 Das Paradies. Die Heimat der Kunst (Paradise. Home of the Arts)
- 1893 Ja... was... möchten wir nicht Alles!, (Yes.....What......We wouldn't all like to have!), A Fable
- 1897 Ich liebe Dich!, (I love you!), A Novel with 66 Intermezzos
- 1897 Tarub, Bagdads berühmte Köchin, (Tarub, Baghdad's famous female cook), Arab culture novel
- 1897 Der Tod der Barmekiden, (The death of the Barmakids), Arab Harem novel
- 1898 Na prost!, (Well, Cheers!), Fantasy King novel
- 1900 Die wilde Jagd, (The wild hunt), A development novel in eight stories
- 1901 Rakkóx der Billionär, (Rakkóx the trillionaire), An ostentatious novel
- 1901 Die Seeschlange (The Sea Serpent), A sea novel
- 1902 Die große Revolution, (The Great Revolution), A moon novel
- 1902 Immer mutig!, (Always courageously!), A Fantasy novel
- 1902 Liwûna und Kaidôh, A Soul novel
- 1902 Weltglanz, (World Shine), a sun fairy tale
- 1903 Kometentanz, (Comet dance), Astral Pantomime in two acts
- 1903 Der Aufgang zur Sonne, (The stairway to the sun), house fairy tales
- 1904 Der Kaiser von Utopia, (The emperor of Utopia), a folktale
- 1904 Machtspäße, (Jests about power), Arab novellas
- 1904 Revolutionäre Theater-Bibliothek, (Revolutionary theatre library), collection of plays
- 1906 Münchhausen und Clarissa, Berlin novel
- 1907 Jenseits-Galeri
- 1909 Die Entwicklung des Luftmilitarismus und die Auflösung der europäischen Land-Heere, Festungen und Seeflotten, (translated into English as The Development of Aerial Militarism and the Demobilization of European Ground Forces, Fortresses, and Naval Fleets, Brooklyn, New York: Ugly Duckling Presse, 2007, Series: Lost Literature #4, translated by M. Kasper)
- 1909 Kater-Poesie, (translatable as Tomcat poetry or Hangover poetry), poems
- 1910 Das Perpetuum mobile, Die Geschichte einer Erfindung (translated into English as The Perpetual Motion Machine: The Story of an Invention, Cambridge, Massachusetts: Wakefield Press, 2011, Imagining Science series)
- 1912 Das große Licht, (The Great Light) A Munchausen–Breviary
- 1912 Flora Mohr, A glass flower novella
- 1913 Lesabéndio. Ein Asteroiden-Roman; translated into English as Lesabéndio: An Asteroid Novel, Cambridge, Massachusetts: Wakefield Press, 2012
- 1914 Das graue Tuch und zehn Prozent Weiß, (The Grey Cloth and Ten Percent of White), a ladies novel. Translated into English as: The Gray Cloth: Paul Scheerbart's Novel on Glass Architecture. Cambridge, Massachusetts; London, England : MIT Press, 2001. ISBN 0-262-19460-0
- 1914 Glasarchitektur (Glass architecture)
- 1921 Von Zimmer zu Zimmer, (From room to room), letters to his wife

== See also ==
- German science fiction literature

== Bibliography ==
- Alvizu, Josh. “Utopie der grünen Sonne: Zu Benjamin, Scheerbart und Glasarchitektur.” Translated by Roland Koch and Frank Degler. Bloch-Almanach 33 (2015): 201–18.
- Anger, Jenny. Four Metaphors of Modernism: From Der Sturm to the Société Anonyme. Minneapolis, MN: University of Minnesota Press, 2018.
- Armond, Kate. “Cosmic Men: Wyndham Lewis, Ernst Haeckel, and Paul Scheerbart.” Journal of Wyndham Lewis Studies 4 (2013): 41–62.
- Arnold-de Simine, Silke. “Remembering the Future: Utopian and Dystopian Aspects of Glass and Iron Architecture in Walter Benjamin, Paul Scheerbarth, and W. G. Sebald.” In Imagining the City, Volume 1: The Art of Urban Living, edited by Christian (ed. and introd.) Emden, Catherine (ed. and introd.) Keen, and David (ed. and introd.) Midgley, 149–69. Cultural History and Literary Imagination (CuHLI): 7. Oxford, England: Peter Lang, 2006.
- Timothy Benson et al.: Expressionist Utopias. Berkeley, University of California Press, 2001. ISBN 0-520-23003-5
- (in German) Mechthild Rausch: Von Danzig ins Weltall. Paul Scheerbarts Anfangsjahre (1863–1895). München: Ed. Text und Kritik 1997. ISBN 3-88377-549-5
- Bletter, Rosemarie Haag. “Global Earthworks.” Art Journal 42, no. 3 (Autumn 1982): 222–25. https://doi.org/10.2307/776582.
- Rosemarie Bletter: "Paul Scheerbart's Architectural Fantasies," Journal of the Society of Architectural Historians 34 (May 1975).
- Fischer, William B. “Whimsical Avant-Garde Oddball.” Science Fiction Studies 40, no. 2 (2013): 389–91. https://doi.org/10.5621/sciefictstud.40.2.0389.
- Gelderloos, Carl. “‘Nowhere an Obstacle’: Transparency, Embodied Perception, and Becoming in Paul Scheerbart’s Lesabéndio.” Modernism/Modernity Print Plus, May 2, 2023. https://doi.org/10.26597/mod.0256.
- (in German) Paul Kaltefleiter, Berni Lörwald und Michael M. Schardt (Hrsg.): Über Paul Scheerbart. 100 Jahre Scheerbart-Rezeption. 3 Bände. Paderborn: Igel-Verlag 1998. ISBN 3-927104-23-X (Band 1); ISBN 3-927104-88-4 (Band 2); ISBN 3-89621-055-6 (Band 3).
- (in German) Uli Kohnle: Paul Scheerbart. Eine Bibliographie. Bellheim: Edition Phantasia 1994. ISBN 3-924959-92-7
- Knoop, Christine Angela. “Architecture and Utopia in Scheerbart’s Rakkóx Der Billionär.” In Text and Image in Modern European Culture, edited by Natasha (ed.) Grigorian, Thomas (ed.) Baldwin, Margaret (ed.) Rigaud-Drayton, and Robert (introd.) Lethbridge, 115–29. Comparative Cultural Studies (Comparative Cultural Studies). West Lafayette, IN: Purdue UP, 2012.
- Josiah McElheny and Christine Burgin eds.: Glass! Love!! Perpetual Motion!!!: A Paul Scheerbart Reader. Chicago, University of Chicago Press, 2014. ISBN 978-0-226-20300-3
- Josiah McElheny: The Light Club: On Paul Scheerbart's The Light Club of Batavia. Chicago, University of Chicago Press, 2010. ISBN 978-0-226-38941-7
- Partsch, Cornelius. “Paul Scheerbart and the Art of Science Fiction.” Science Fiction Studies 29, no. 2 (2002): 202–20.
- Scheerbart, Paul. Lesabéndio. An Asteroid Novel, trans. Christina Svendsen (Cambridge, MA: Wakefield Press, 2012)
- (in German) Paul Scheerbart Ingo Kühl Glasarchitektur, Texts Paul Scheerbart (1914) and Curt Grützmacher (editor), with 48 Silkscreen prints by Ingo Kühl, 1988.ISBN 978-3-924993-52-8
- Sharp, Dennis, ed. Glass Architecture by Paul Scheerbart and Alpine Architecture by Bruno Taut. Translated by James Palmes and Shirley Palmer. New York: Praeger, 1972.
- Stuart, John A. “Unweaving Narrative Fabric: Bruno Taut, Walter Benjamin, and Paul Scheerbart’s ‘The Gray Cloth.’” Journal of Architectural Education (1984-) 53, no. 2 (1999): 61–73.
