= Lesabéndio =

1913 novel by Paul Scheerbart

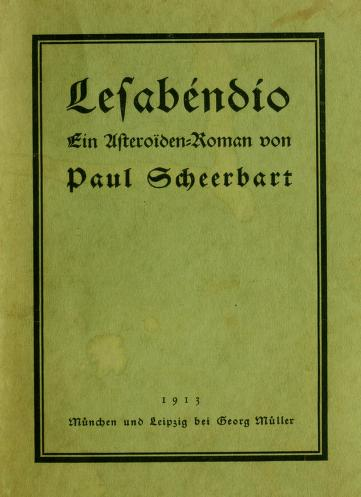
- Author: Paul Scheerbart
- Translator: Christina Svendsen
- Illustrator: Alfred Kubin
- Language: German
- Publisher: Georg Müller Verlag
- Publication date: 1913
- Publication place: Germany
- English publication date: November 2012
- Pages: 282

Lesabéndio: An Asteroid Novel (German: Lesabéndio. Ein Asteroïden-Roman) is a 1913 science fiction novel by the German writer Paul Scheerbart.

== Plot ==
The novel is set on the asteroid Pallas which is populated by thin, rubbery creatures who can change their body shape, stand on a suction-cup foot, move fast with wings on their backs and have telescopic eyes. The Pallasian Lesabéndio, or Lesa for short, is bothered by a cobweb-cloud that obfuscates the space above them and sets out to build a tall tower that reaches above it. Lesa engages a number of Pallasian artisans, each with a unique ability, through which the building process and Pallasian society are described in detail. When Lesa eventually reaches above the cobweb-cloud, it impacts the entire population by changing how consciousness operates.

== Reception ==
After Wakefield Press published Lesabéndio in Christina Svendsen's English translation in 2012, John F. Barber wrote in Leonardo that it was "ecological before ecology was a discipline, and science fiction before it was a literary genre", and that it "may also be read as a political parable about the dangers and necessities of conflict".

Erik Morse of the Los Angeles Review of Books wrote that Lesabéndio preceded Martin Heidegger's Being and Time and Peter Sloterdijk's Spheres trilogy by exploring "the question of Being as synonymous with a certain technology of environmentality". Morse wrote that Scheerbart's obsession with modern architecture impacts the book's form, prompting questions about its nature: "is it a novel, a manifesto, a futurist handbook, or all of the above?"

== See also ==
- The Gray Cloth, another novel by Scheerbart
