= Carlos Morla Vicuña =

Chilean diplomat and politician

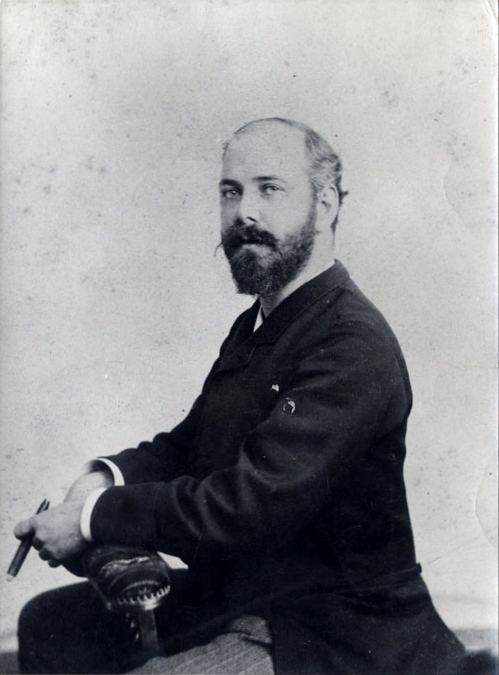
- Morla Vicuña in Paris, 1883

Minister of Foreign Affairs, Worship and Colonization
- In office April 30, 1896 – May 11, 1897
- President: Federico Errázuriz Echaurren
- Preceded by: Carlos Antúnez González
- Succeeded by: Raimundo Silva Cruz

Deputy of the Republic of Chile
- In office 1870–1873
- Constituency: Parral

Personal details
- Born: Carlos María Vicuña Zaldívar; 1846 Santiago, Chile
- Died: 1900 (aged 54) Buffalo, New York, United States
- Party: Conservative
- Spouse: Luisa Lynch
- Children: Nicolasa, Carlos, Ximena, Carmen, Paz, and Wanda
- Parent(s): César Vicuña Toro-Zambrano; María del Carmen Solo de Zaldívar Rivera
- Relatives: Patricio Lynch (maternal half-brother)

Carlos Morla Vicuña (born Carlos María Vicuña Zaldívar; Santiago, 1846 – Buffalo, New York, United States, 1900) was a conservative politician and diplomat from Chile.

== Biography ==
He was born from an affair between his mother, María del Carmen Solo de Zaldívar Rivera, and young César Vicuña Toro-Zambrano while her husband, the Argentine military officer Estanislao Lynch Roo, was absent. His mother entrusted him to the care of the Jesuits. After Lynch Roo's death in 1849, Carlos was recognized by his biological father and taken into his custody. He was also welcomed by his maternal half-siblings, the Lynch Solo de Zaldívar (Martina, Estanislao, Patricio, Luis Alfredo, and Julio Ángel). At 16, he began using the surname "Morla," an anagram of "amor" (love) and "moral," and officially legalized it at 21.

He studied at Colegio San Ignacio and later pursued law at the University of Chile. He worked as a journalist; in 1869, he joined the editorial team of La República. That same year, he became a member of the Conservative Party and served as an alternate deputy for Parral in 1870 (replacing Cesáreo Valdés Ortúzar on June 4) and again in 1873.

Morla began his diplomatic career abroad in 1870, having joined the Foreign Ministry the previous year. He was first assigned to the Chilean legation in the United States. In 1871, he became secretary of the Chilean mission to France and England under Ambassador Alberto Blest Gana. In 1873, he was commissioned by the Chilean government to research archival materials in Spain regarding the southernmost regions of South America, remaining in Europe until 1885.

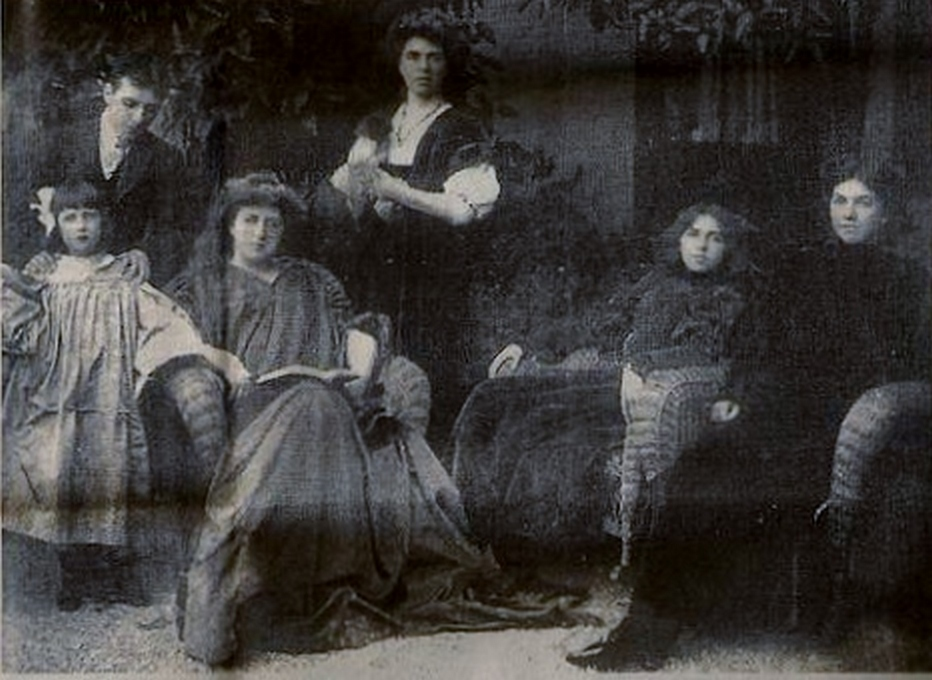
Morla's widow, Luisa Lynch, with their children Wanda, Carlos, Carmen, Ximena, and Paz; 1904.

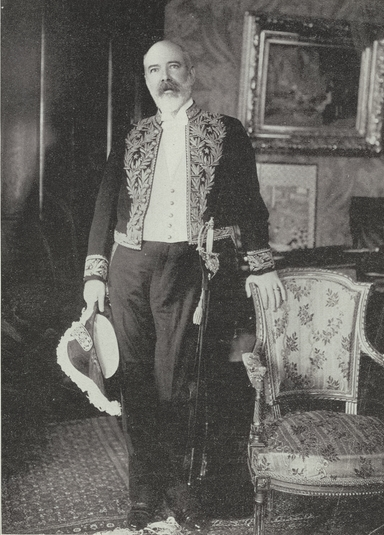
Carlos Morla Vicuña in diplomatic attire.

In London, Morla met his niece Luisa Lynch, a writer and journalist, while staying with his half-brother Luis Alfredo Lynch, a Chilean Navy officer overseeing torpedo boat construction during the War of the Pacific. Despite the complications arising from their familial ties, the couple married in 1884 in London after securing the necessary dispensations.

The couple had six children: Nicolasa, who died young; Carlos, a diplomat; Ximena and Carmen, both writers; Paz; and Wanda, all born abroad during his diplomatic missions.

In 1885, he was appointed chargé d'affaires in Brazil but soon returned to Paris. His wife, Luisa, became a close friend of the patron Eugenia Huici de Errázuriz, and the couple mingled with Chilean expatriate elites and French intellectuals. This circle explains why sculptor Auguste Rodin created a bust of Luisa.

Morla left diplomacy in 1891 but rejoined the service in 1895. He served briefly in Uruguay and Paraguay before being appointed ambassador to Argentina and later Minister of Foreign Affairs under Federico Errázuriz Echaurren. He resigned in 1897 amidst political tensions.

In 1900, Morla, while preparing Chile's pavilion for the upcoming Pan-American Exposition in Buffalo, New York, died at age 54.

== Works ==
- La cuestion de límites entre Chile y la República Arjentina; La Patria, 1879.
- Estudio histórico sobre el descubrimiento y conquista de la Patagonia y de la Tierra del Fuego; F. A. Brockhaus, Leipzig, 1903.
