= María Mercedes Vial =

- Born: María Mercedes Vial Solar; 1863; Santiago, Chile
- Died: 1942 (aged 78–79); Santiago, Chile
- Other name: Serafia
- Occupation: Writer
- Years active: 1917–1942
- Spouse: Rafael Ugarte Ovalle

María Mercedes Vial Solar (1863–1942), also known as María Mercedes Vial de Ugarte or by her literary pseudonym Serafia, was a Chilean feminist writer and novelist.

Her parents were Wenceslao Vial y Guznián and Luisa Solar y Marín.

For some authors, her work can be framed within so-called "aristocratic feminism", along with other writers such as Inés Echeverría Bello, Mariana Cox Méndez, Teresa Wilms Montt, María Luisa Fernández, and the sisters Ximena and Carmen Morla Lynch.

== Works ==
- Cosas que fueron (novel, Santiago: Zig-Zag, 1917)
- Amor que no muere (novel, Santiago: Editorial Nascimiento, 1929)
- Algo pasado de moda : conferencias dadas en el Club de Señoras (Santiago: Impr. Cervantes, 1926)
