= Ester Cosani =

Chilean writer and illustrator (1914–2001)

- Born: Ester Cosani Sologuren; 24 December 1914; Arica, Chile
- Died: March 2001 (aged 86); Concepción, Chile
- Occupations: Writer, illustrator
- Writing career
- Pen name: Rita Cosani

Ester Cosani Sologuren (24 December 1914 – March 2001), known by the pen name Rita Cosani, was a Chilean writer and illustrator. Active during the late 1930s and early 1940s, Cosani was one of the forerunners of Chilean children's literature.

== Career ==
Cosani's work as a cartoonist began for the magazine El Colegial. She later participated in drafting the charter of the Chilean Drawing Alliance, which she signed in 1941, along with illustrators Carmen Eysaud, Elizabeth Wilkens, and Elena Poirier. In 1951 she was awarded the Director's Prize of the National Theater for her work La casa de las ratas. She also narrated a children's radio program named La cajita de música.

== Works ==
- Leyenda de la quena (1938)
- Leyendas de la vieja casa (1938)
- Para saber y contar (1939)
- Las desventuras de Andrajo (1942)
- Cuentos a Pelusa (1943)
- La casa de las ratas (1943)
- Cuentos a Beatriz (1957)
- Una historia de ángeles (1957)
- Rimas (1994)
- Cuentos de Tocorí de la Sierra (1995)
