= Arkadi Kuleshov =

Belarusian poet

Arkadź Aljaksandravič Kulašoǔ (Belarusian: Арка́дзь Алякса́ндравіч Куляшо́ў, russified form Arkadi Aleksandrovich Kuleshov, Russian: Арка́дий Алекса́ндрович Кулешо́в; February 6, 1914 – February 4, 1978) was a Soviet and Belarusian poet, translator and screenwriter. He was best known for his poems, Brigade Flag and Cymbalon, as well as his translations of poetry into Belarusian.

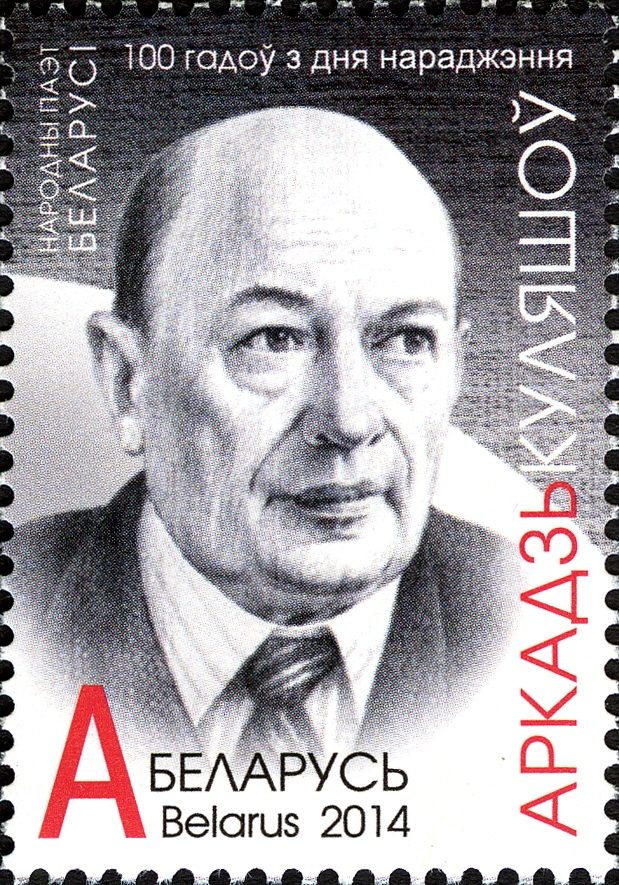
Stamp of Belarus of 2014 "100 years to the Belarusian writer Arkadź Kulašoǔ"
