= Vera Zouroff =

Chilean writer

Vera Zouroff (Zig-Zag, 23 February 1934, Santiago de Chile)

Esmeralda Zenteno Urizar (18 July 1880 – 1967), known by her pseudonym Vera Zouroff, was a Chilean feminist, editor, writer, novelist, poet, and correspondent. Lecturing on Socialismo en Chile, she advocated the form of socialism which gives women a share in the practical direction of the world. She also provided a leadership role at the Centro Femenino de Estudio in Santiago. Zenteno married Arturo León del Río, after which she was known as Esmeralda Zenteno de León. She had five children.

Zouroff was born in Antofagasta on 18 July 1880. She died in 1967.

== Partial works ==
- Martha (1916)
- ¡Liberación! (1919)
- México fuera y dentro de sus fronteras (1932)
- Hollywood (1932)
- Feminismo obrero (1933)
- La guerra (1937)
- Devocionario dedicado a celebrar las dieciocho apariciones de la Sna. Virgen en la Gruta de Lourdes (1939)
- El arte de la declamación: enseñanza y práctica de este arte (1945)
- El Cenáculo de poesía a sus poetas (1947)
- O’Higgins : libertador de Chile, gran mariscal del Perú (1949)
- Evocaciones del Perú (1949)
- Beatriz Sandoval (1954)
