= Alice Gore King =

American artist (1914–2007)

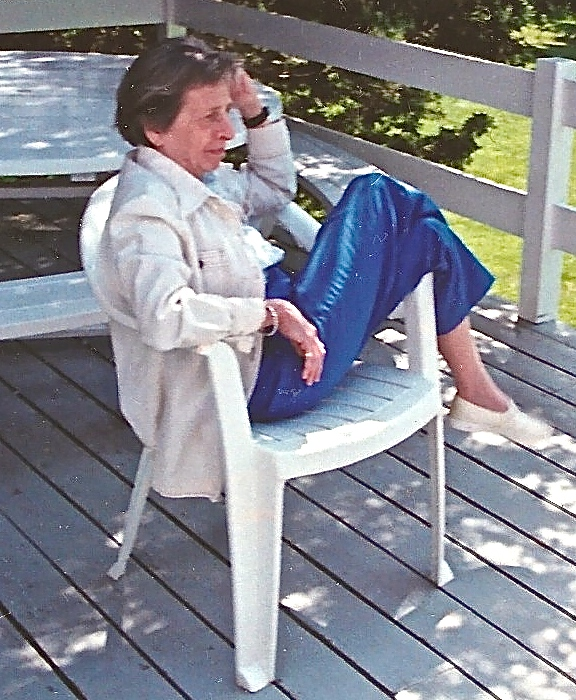
- Alice Gore King in Ridgefield, CT.
- Born: Alice Gore King; July 17, 1914; New York, NY
- Died: May 26, 2007 (aged 92); Hamden, CT
- Education: BA, MA in Psychology
- Alma mater: Bryn Mawr College
- Known for: Painting, Women's Rights

Alice Gore King (July 17, 1914 – May 26, 2007) was a women’s rights entrepreneur, educator, writer, artist, and a native New Yorker. King grew up and spent much of her life working in New York City where she became the chairman of the Remedial Reading Department and later assistant head of the prestigious Brearley School, an all girls private school on the Upper East Side. King went on to start and become the Executor Director of the Alumnae Advisory Center, a career counseling and placement organization for women.

== Early life ==
King was born in New York City on July 17, 1914, to librarian Marion Morrison King (a relative of Elizabeth Cady Stanton) and banker Frederick Gore King (great grandson of Rufus King).

After graduating from the Brearley School, King attended Bryn Mawr College and received a Bachelor of Arts followed by a Master of Arts in psychology.

== Career ==
King began her career in 1942 as Warden and Vocational Adviser at Bryn Mawr College. In 1943, she took a job as Personnel Supervisor at Pratt & Whitney. After World War II, King became the Head of the Psychology Department at the Brearley School, the chairperson of the Remedial Reading Department and later Assistant Head of the School. In 1950, King founded the Alumnae Advisory Center as a career counseling and placement service for college women in New York and served as Executive Director there for 27 years. From 1977 to 1979, King served as a consultant for the center before retiring that year.

== Alumni Advisory Center ==
The Alumnae Advisory Center (1950-early 80s) aimed to help women advance to executive positions, find part-time jobs, or return to work after raising children. The center was located in the Women’s Exchange building, 541 Madison Avenue between 54 and 55 Streets until 1980 when it became known as Council for Career Planning and moved to 310 Madison Avenue. The center first opened with nineteen Founding Member colleges including Barnard College, Bennington College, Bryn Mawr College, Bradford College (United States), Centenary College of New Jersey, Colby, Connecticut, Goucher College, Howard University, Keukia, Middlebury, Pemborke, Sarah Lawrence, Swarthmore, Vassar College, Wells College, Western, Hobart and William Smith Colleges, and Wooster. Members of the Board of Directors included individuals like Sarah Gibson Blanding. Although the center made its services available to men, it was not until the 1970s with newly formed co-educational colleges that its male clientele increased. Dolly Cannon became Executive Director in 1977. The Center moved to 310 Madison Avenue in 1980.

== Personal life ==
King’s writings were published in magazines such as Good Housekeeping and Glamour and in newspapers including The New York Times, The Christian Science Monitor, Today’s Secretary and the Ridgefield Press. King published at least three books including “Women in Business” (Dutton, 1964), “Help Wanted: Female” (Scribner’s, 1968) and “Women And Careers In the Big Apple” (Alumnae Advisory Center, 1983).

== Writings ==
=== Articles ===
- “To Stagger Traffic Lights”, New York Times, September 25, 1958.
- “Pedal for Mailboxes”, New York Times, February 2, 1971.
- “Present Since the Creation”, American Heritage Magazine, December 1994 Volume 45, Issue 8.
- “What Women Want Is Simple Respect”, New York Times, January 21, 1990.
- “Connecticut Opinion; Getting the Short Shrift From the Tall”, New York Times, January 25, 1987.
- “Connecticut Opinion; Installing a Dishwasher in 77 Days”, New York Times, April 17, 1988.
- “Making the Most of Special Events”, New York Times, September 29, 1985.
- “How to Create an Effective Board”, Non-profit World, Volume 12, No. 2 / March/April 1994.

=== Books ===
- Help Wanted: Female; the Young Woman's Guide to Job-Hunting (New York: Scribner, 1968).
- Career Opportunities for women in business (Ann Arbor: Dutton, 1963).
- Data Processing Explained (New York, Alumnae Advisory Center, 1968).
- Women and careers in the Big Apple : three decades of development : the story of the Alumnae Advisory Center (New York, Alumnae Advisory Center, 1983).
- How to look for a job in New York (New York, Alumnae Advisory Center, 1966).
- Alice Gore King & M. Jean Herman, The Job Interview (New York, Alumnae Advisory Center, 1966).
