= Glass Pavilion =

Pavilion in Deutz, Germany

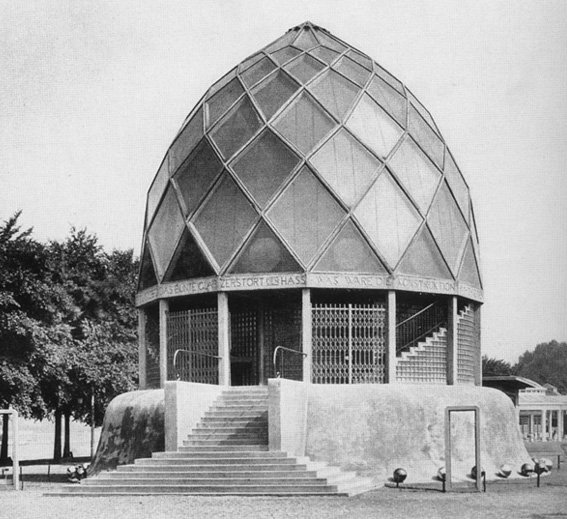
1914 "Glass Pavilion" of Bruno Taut

The Glass Pavilion, designed by Bruno Taut and built in 1914, was a prismatic glass dome structure at the Cologne Deutscher Werkbund Exhibition. The structure was a brightly colored landmark of the exhibition, constructed using concrete and glass. The dome had a double glass outer layer with colored glass prisms on the inside and reflective glass on the outside. The facade had inlaid colored glass plates that acted as mirrors. Taut described his "little temple of beauty" as "reflections of light whose colors began at the base with a dark blue and rose up through moss green and golden yellow to culminate at the top in a luminous pale yellow."

The Glass Pavilion is Taut's single best-known architectural achievement. He built it for the German glass industry association specifically for the 1914 exhibition. They financed the structure that was considered a house of art. The purpose of the building was to demonstrate the potential of different types of glass for architecture. It also indicated how the material might be used to orchestrate human emotions and assist in the construction of a spiritual utopia. The structure was made at the time when expressionism was most fashionable in Germany, and it is sometimes referred to as an expressionist-style building. The only known photographs of the building were made in 1914, but these black-and-white images are only marginal representations of the actualities of the work. The building was destroyed soon after the exhibition since it was an exhibition building only and not built for practical use.

The Glass Pavilion was a pineapple-shaped multi-faceted polygonal designed rhombic structure. It had a fourteen-sided base constructed of thick glass bricks used for the exterior walls devoid of rectangles. Each part of the cupola was designed to recall the complex geometry of nature. The Pavilion structure was on a concrete plinth, the entrance reached by two flights of steps (one on either side of the building), which gave the pavilion a temple-like quality. Taut's Glass Pavilion was the first building of importance made of glass bricks.

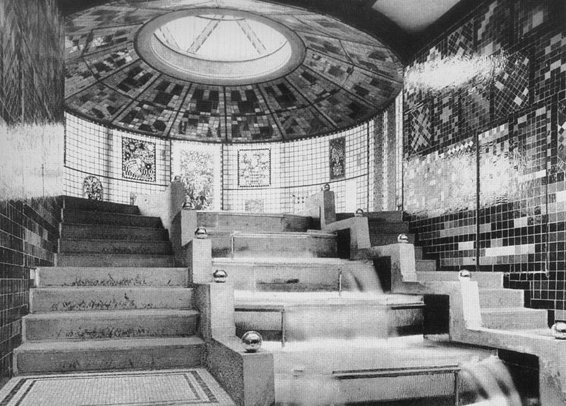
Interior staircases and waterfalls

There were glass-treaded metal staircases inside that led to the upper projection room that showed a kaleidoscope of colors. Between the staircases was a seven-tiered cascading waterfall with underwater lighting, this created a sensation of descending to the lower level "as if through sparkling water". The interior had prisms producing colored rays from the outside sunlight. The floor-to-ceiling colored glass walls were mosaic. All this had the effect of a large crystal producing a large variety of colors.

The frieze of the Glass Pavilion was written with aphoristic poems of glass done by the anarcho-socialist writer Paul Scheerbart. Examples of these were "Colored glass destroys hatred" and "Without a glass palace, life is a conviction". Scheerbart's ideas also inspired the ritualistic composition of the interior. For Scheerbart, bringing in the light of the moon and the stars brought in different positive feelings which led to a whole new culture.

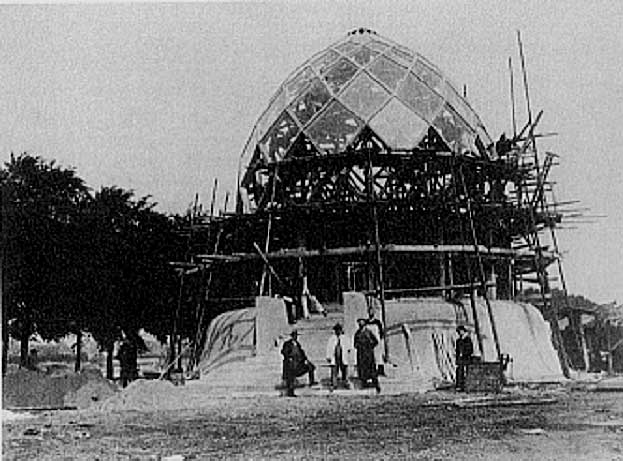
"Glass Pavilion" of Taut being built

Paul Scheerbart in 1914 published a book called Glasarchitektur ("Architecture in glass") and dedicated it to Taut. Taut in 1914 founded a magazine called Frühlicht ("Dawn's Light") for his Expressionist devotees. It emphasized the iconography of glass which is also represented by his Glass Pavilion. This philosophy can be traced back to accounts of Solomon's Temple. An early drawing of the Glass Pavilion by Taut says he made it in the spirit of a Gothic cathedral.

== Taut's idea for "Glass Pavilion" ==
Taut called on architects to follow him into the contemporary Expressionist painters in seeking a new artistic spirit, he wanted to create a building with a different structure, and similar to Gothic Cathedrals. Bruno said that his building didn't have any real function, it was more to provoke something in someone than a practical building.

The Glass Pavilion or "Glashaus" was one of the first exhibition buildings designed as a mechanism to create vivid experiences, where people would be able to feel, touch, and primarily see.

The goal of this functionless building was that architecture would include the other arts of painting and sculpture to achieve a new, unified expression.

"The longing for purity and clarity, for glowing lightness and crystalline exactness, for immaterial lightness and infinite liveliness found a means of its fulfillment in glass—the most ineffable, most elementary, most flexible and most changeable of materials, richest in meaning and inspiration, fusing with the world like no other. This least fixed of materials transforms itself with every change of atmosphere. It is infinitely rich in elations, mirroring what is above, below, and what is below, above. It is animated, full of spirit and alive ... It is an example of a transcendent passion to build, functionless, free, satisfying no practical demands—and yet a functional building, soulful, awakening spiritual inspirations—an ethical functional building" -Behne

This building was made into an installation, a symbol, a mystical sign and a start for a new world view and future architecture.
