= The Wife of Sir Isaac Harman =

1914 novel by H. G. Wells

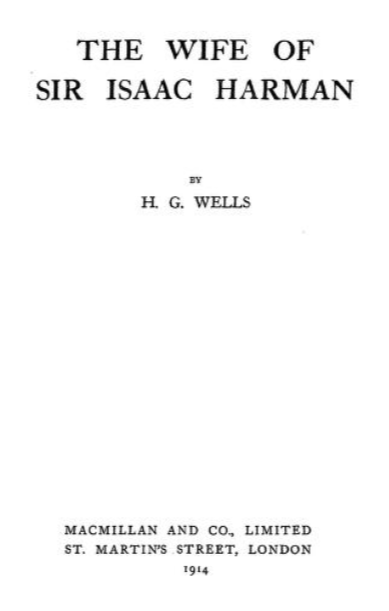
- Title page for The Wife of Sir Isaac Harman (1914)
- Author: H. G. Wells
- Language: English
- Genre: Novel
- Publisher: Macmillan
- Publication date: 1914
- Publication place: United Kingdom
- English publication date: October 1914
- Pages: 525

The Wife of Sir Isaac Harman is a 1914 novel by H. G. Wells.

== Plot summary ==
The protagonist of The Wife of Sir Isaac Harman is Lady Harman, née Ellen Sawbridge. The moral, emotional, and intellectual conflicts that this tall, sensitive, graceful woman confronts arise in the context of a loveless marriage with Sir Isaac Harman, a self-made man who has grown rich as the proprietor of International Bread and Cake Stores and Staminal Bread. Sir Isaac meets his future wife when she is only seventeen and still a student in a boardinghouse in Wimbledon; she marries him largely out of pity. But the marriage is not a happy one, despite great wealth and the birth of four children. Sir Isaac is inherently domineering, and in an age of Suffragettes he encounters a desire for greater freedom in his wife.

The plot of the novel turns on Lady Harman's relationship with George Brumley (invariably "Mr. Brumley" in the text), a successful genteel novelist whose wife has died three and a half years earlier. Lady Harman meets Mr. Brumley because the Harmans buy his house, Black Strand, in the countryside outside London. Mr. Brumley falls in love with Lady Harman at first sight. His interest in her leads him and a number of acquaintances to pay Lady Harman a visit. This results is invitations to luncheons and committees for Lady Harman, and despite all his efforts the possessive Sir Isaac is unable to quell his wife's desire to accept. Through many twists and turns Mr. Brumley's attachment to Lady Harman increases until, after the death of Sir Isaac, he appears to win her love on the novel's concluding page. (This comes after she has definitively refused to marry him, and the reader is left uncertain whether her passionate kiss signifies that she has changed her mind on this question.)

== Themes ==
Like Ann Veronica, The Wife of Sir Isaac Harman reflects H.G. Wells's enthusiasm for the ideal of the New Woman. Lady Harman's interest in the condition of women persuades Sir Isaac (after Lady Harman's imprisonment for a month for breaking a post office window in support of the cause of women's suffrage has shocked him into acquiescence) to invest in the creation of six boardinghouses for working women. She enlists the aid of the devoted Mr. Brumley, and his inquiries result in certain Wellsian convictions that she embraces: "the forces of social organization have been coming into play now, more and more for a century and a half, to produce new wholesale ways of doing things, new great organizations, organizations that invade the autonomous family more and more, and are perhaps destined ultimately to destroy it altogether and supersede it." Lady Harman comes to see her work with the hostels in this context and as her raison d'être.

While somewhat muted, racial antisemitic stereotypes permeate the novel. Sir Isaac's avidity, and his pointed nose and its visibility in his children, are frequently mentioned, and his business efficiency is linked to characteristics like those suggested in this passage about his youth: "his disposition at cricket to block and to bowl 'sneaks' and 'twisters' under-arm had raised his average rather than his reputation; he had evaded fights and dramatic situations, and protected himself on occasions of unavoidable violence by punching with his white knuckles held in a peculiar and vicious manner. He has always been a little insensitive to those graces of style, in action if now in art, which appeal so strongly to the commoner sort of English mind; he played first for safety, and that assured, for uttermost advantage. These tendencies became more marked with maturity." But Sir Isaac's Jewishness is never discussed; indeed, it is never even made explicit. Instead, it is conveyed through asides and insinuations.

The Wife of Sir Isaac Harman is also an extensive satire of many aspects of British society on the eve of World War I.

== Composition and reception ==
H.G. Wells wrote most of The Wife of Sir Isaac Harman in late 1913 and early 1914; the novel was published on October 23rd 1914. Early presentation copies and Advanced Review Copies were sent out to well known book collectors such as Robert Crewe-Milnes, the 1st Marquis of Crewe. Wells claimed that the title character derived from Maud Pember Reeves and Agnes Eleanor Jacobs née Williams.

Early reviews were tentative, but grew more positive after Holbrook Jackson reviewed the novel favourably in T.P.'s Weekly. But Walter Lippmann judged it a "careless book" written from the "upper layers" of Wells's mind. In 1951 biographer Vincent Brome observed that the novel was "read with deeply diminished interest to-day." Biographers Norman and Jeanne Mackenzie called The Wife of Sir Isaac Harman Wells's "counterpart of Ibsen's A Doll's House."
