= Inés Echeverría Bello =

Chilean writer

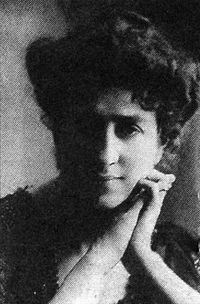
- Born: Inés Elena Echeverría Bello; 22 December 1868; Santiago, Chile
- Died: 13 January 1949 (aged 80); Santiago, Chile
- Burial place: Santiago General Cemetery, Recoleta, Santiago, Chile
- Other name: Inés Echeverría de Larraín
- Spouse: Joaquín Larraín Alcalde (m. 1892; died 1933)
- Children: 4, including Rebeca Larraín Echeverría
- Parents: Inés Bello Reyes; Félix María Echeverría Valdés
- Relatives: Andrés Bello (maternal great-grandfather); Rebeca Matte Bello (cousin)
- Writing career
- Occupation: Writer
- Pen name: Iris; Arc-en-ciel; Inés Bello
- Language: Spanish; French
- Period: 1904–1949

Inés Echeverría Bello (22 December 1868–13 January 1949) was a Chilean writer and feminist.

== Early life and education ==
Inés Elena Echeverría Bello was born on 22 December 1968 in Santiago to an upper class Catholic Chilean family. Echeverría's father, Félix María Echeverría Valdés (1841–1915), was a lawyer and member of the Conservative Party. Echeverría's mother, Inés Bello Reyes, was the granddaughter of Andrés Bello and a member of the prominent Bello family.

Echeverría's mother died shortly after childbirth, and Echeverría was subsequently raised by her paternal aunt, Dolores Echeverría Valdés. Educated at home by a governess, Echeverría was instructed in religion, music, embroidery, French and English. As a child Echeverría began keeping a diary in French.

On 10 April 1892, Echeverría married Joaquín Larraín Alcalde, a Captain in the Chilean Army. Together Larraín and Echeverría had four daughters, Rebeca, Inés, Luz and Iris.

== Career ==
Inés Echeverría Bello was a rebel against the conservative conventions of her social class regarding the role of women. In 1904, she published her first book Hacia el Oriente under an anonymous name. Later she used the pseudonym Iris, as well as Inés Bello and Rainbow.

After a long trip to Europe and the Holy Land, in 1905, across the birth of her fourth and only daughter, and the publication of her first book, she started literary gatherings in her house that were attended by the intellectual elite of the time, with people like Augusto D'Halmar, Luis Orrego Luco, Joaquín Edwards Bello, Mariano Latorre, Fernando Santiván, among others. In 1910 she published four books that made a big impact due to their critical content: Perfiles Vagos, Tierra Virgen, Emociones Teatrales y Hojas Caídas. Echeverría's first publications were the Perfiles Vagos, a record of her extensive travels through Europe, and Tierra Virgen, a study of Southern Chile. Her next writings, a series of articles, were contributed to Chilean magazines. In 1914, Echeverría published in Paris a novel Entre Deux Mondes, which received favorable recognition. It was followed in 1917, by La Hora de Queda, whose theme was based on the life of the South American resident in the French capital. In 1918, Echeverría contributed articles to "La Nación". Besides the works mentioned and her writings in "El Mercurio", "Familia", "Zig-Zag", and "Sucesos", she published Emociones Teatrales, a collection of theatrical criticisms.

In 1915, Inés Echeverría Bello participated in the founding of a Reading Club along with Amanda Labarca, and in 1916 the Ladies Club along with Delia Matte de Izquierdo, both instances in which the women of the gentry of Santiago could have intellectual and political discussions, and where the feminist movement was beginning to emerge at the beginning of the 20th century. These women, in turn, came into close contact with the avant-garde youth, young university students with artistic, political and social interests, who together supported Alessandri's candidacy for 1920. nés and her fellow aristocratic associates lived lifestyles that defied traditional molds, were considered eccentric and branded sometimes immoral by the "well-thinking" society and the "decent neighborhood" of the time. They kept a certain distance from the political front, claiming in an article in La Revista Azul, ""We could talk about politics but we prefer not to touch it, because we think like Madame Augol that "la politique est tres peu poetique". The participation in this populist candidacy by Inés Echeverría and all the social and intellectual effervescence of the moment is extensively related in her work Memorias, published posthumously by her granddaughter in 2005.

She was also close friends with Eliodoro Yáñez and Arturo Alessandri, who she started collaborating with in the 1910s.

In 1922 she became the first academic woman in the Facultad de Filosofía y Letras at the University of Chile. For some authors, her work may be categorized as aristocratic feminism, which includes other authors such as Vera Zouroff, Mariana Cox Méndez, Teresa Wilms Montt, María Luisa Fernández de García Huidobro y Ximena Morla Lynch, among others.

In total, she published 18 books and a hundred articles in newspapers, including in La Nación and El Mercurio, the magazines Zig-Zag and La Familia, among others.

=== French ===
As an adult, she declared in an interview with Amanda Labarca in 1915, that she preferred this language to castellano, because this was the language that represented society that constrained women as well as being the language of the cook. However, the main part of her work was written in castellano and she never lived abroad, even though she spent large time periods in different places in Europe, mainly Paris, also making a pilgrimage to Jerusalem.

=== Religion ===
An active Catholic until her 30s, she began her theosophical and spiritualist transformation at the beginning of the twentieth century, although she never lost the link with the Christian figures that were so central to her early years.

Inés Echeverría participated in the spiritualist movement, forming part of the intellectual anti-materialistic and anti-positivism movement that spanned across Europe and Latin America at the end of the 19th century and beginning of the 20th century. Iris can be considered as the most representative figure of avant-garde spiritualism, seeing the soul as what justified human existence and the most sublime and transcendent experience. She conceived the inner abode and depth of spiritual life as the focus of all creation and as the raw material of art.

== Por él ==
On the 30 June 1933, Echeverría's eldest daughter Rebeca Larraín Echeverría was murdered by her husband, Roberto Barceló Lira.

The Caso Barceló was very prominent among the Santiago elite of the time, as it had to do with the social and political influence of the compromised families, the lack of precedents regarding convictions for conjugal crimes to members of the aristocracy, the cultural situation of the moment in terms of the conception of conjugal crimes and their legal aspect. In 1934, Echeverría published Por él , the only work published under her own name. The book acts as a plea for justice that Roberto Barceló be shot. The chronology of this crime indicates that Barceló was sentenced in the first instance to death on January 23, 1934, for the crime of parricide. He filed an appeal in cassation with the Supreme Court, trying to annul the judicial sentence. The appeal was rejected on May 25, 1934, and the original sentence was confirmed on November 23, 1936. Barceló Lira was shot on November 26 after the denial of the pardon requested from the President of the Republic Arturo Alessandri Palma (1868–1950).

Por él had a testimonial function and served as another proof in the ratification of the conviction of Barceló, a process that came to occupy the space of the press, in the pages of El diario ilustrado and the magazine Sucesos. Inés Echeverría helped the fulfillment of the sentence and the subsequent execution of Roberto Barceló, who "became the first and only aristocrat to whom the maximum penalty has been applied in Chile".

== Works ==
- Hacia el Oriente, Zig-Zag,
- Emociones teatrales, Santiago: Imprenta Barcelona, 1910.
- Hojas caídas. Santiago: Imprenta Universitaria, 1910.
- Entre deux mondes. París: Bernard Grasset, editeur, 1914.
- La Hora de queda. Santiago: Imprenta Universitaria, 1918. (short story)
- Cuando mi tierra nació. Santiago: Nascimento, 1930. (historical novel)
- Nuestra raza: a la memoria de Andrés Bello: su 4ª generación. Santiago: Universitaria, 1930.
- Alessandri: evocaciones y resonancias. Santiago: Empresa Letras, 1932?.
- Por él. Santiago: Imprenta Universitaria, 1934.
- Entre dos siglos. Santiago: Eds. Ercilla, 1937.
- Cuando mi tierra era niña. Santiago: Nascimento, 1942. 2v. (historical novel)
- Cuando mi tierra fue moza. Santiago: Nascimento, 1943–46. 3v. (historical novel)
- Au-delà-- : poème de la douleur et de la mort: fragments d'un journal de la mort. Santiago: Imprenta La Sudamericana, 1948
- Fue el enviado: no lo olvidemos. Santiago: Nascimento, 1950 (published after death)
- Memorias de Iris. 1899-1925. Santiago: Aguilar, 2005. (translated from French)
