= Elizabeth Subercaseaux =

Chilean journalist and writer

- Born: Elizabeth Subercaseaux Sommerhoff; 1945 (age 80–81); Santiago, Chile
- Occupations: Journalist, writer
- Spouses: Carlos Eugenio Lavín (c. 1967–1974); John J. Hassett
- Children: Angelica, Alejandra, Carlos
- Mother: Gerda Sommerhoff

Elizabeth Subercaseaux Sommerhoff (born 1945) is a Chilean journalist and writer.

== Biography ==
Elizabeth Subercaseaux grew up near Cauqenes, Chile at her grandparents' home called Santa Clara. Subercaseaux's father died in 1956, when he was 42 years old and she was 11. The five children of the marriage – Bernardo and Juan, older than Elizabeth, and Martin and Ximena, younger – were brought up by their mother, the sculptor, painter, and photographer Gerda Sommerhoff, who was a German and grew up in Holland, the great-granddaughter of the German composer Robert Schumann and Clara Wieck.

After finishing high school in 1967, she traveled to Spain with her first husband, Carlos Eugenio Lavín, from whom she would be separated seven years later and with whom she had three children: Angelica, Alejandra, and Carlos Lavín Subercaseaux.

== Career ==
Elizabeth Subercaseaux began her journalistic career as a contributor to the Nuevo Diario of Madrid.

On her return to Chile in 1974, she served as director of the children's magazine El Peque, taught at the University of Chile's School of Journalism, and performed interviews for the magazines Cosas, Apsi, Master, and Caras.

In 1990 she traveled to the United States, where she currently lives with her husband, Spanish-American literature professor, literary critic, and translator, John J. Hassett. There, in addition to continuing to write for various media, she has been a lecturer. She is a regular contributor to Ocean Drive magazine, and the newspapers La Nación of Santiago and Al Día of Philadelphia.

For 18 years she was a columnist for the magazine Vanidades Continental. "La Tia Eulogia", her humor column, was very successful in Latin America.

Subercaseaux has been a columnist, interviewer, and reporter in various media, including the magazines Apsi, Cosas, Caras, Cuadernos Cervantes, El Sábado, Vanidades Continental, Master, and Vivir Mejor. She has been a correspondent for the BBC, as well as for the Colombian magazine Semana and the Argentine Crisis.

It has been noted that "her work, mainly testimonial, is of political and social criticism of her country, with permanent concern for human rights and for the role of Chilean women in the last decades."

She has been cited as a major force in guiding public opinion about Augusto Pinochet, especially in grassroots movements. After attempting to arrange an interview with him for fifteen years, Subercaseaux finally received a chance to interview the dictator in 1988. In interviews with Subercaseaux after her time in Chile, she speaks of the great terror felt by uncensored journalists in Chile during the time of Pinochet's dictatorship. Subercaseaux was beaten by police on her own street when she lived in Chile. Half of her family was in exile during Pinochet's reign.

Her first book of fiction, the story compilation Silendra, was published in 1986, though she claims to have been writing since age 10. In 1988 her first novel, El canto de la raíz lejana, was published. Since then this has been her main genre, and she has written 25 books, among which are humor features, novels (two of crime fiction), and books of short journalistic pieces.

Subercaseaux's Barrio Alto series – the books Vendo casa en el Barrio Alto (2009), Compro Lago Caburga (2011), and Clínica Jardín del Este (2013) – constitute a portrait of Chilean society at the beginning of the 21st century. Grínor Rojo included the first in his book of essays Las novelas de la oligarquía chilena. The second novel, a continuation of the portrait of the upper class to which Subercaseaux herself belongs, was well received by critics and repeated the successful sales of Vendo casa en el Barrio Alto. The critic Camilo Marks wrote:

It is rather more reflective than the previous narrative, and although the author's ability to be entertaining remains intact, the social picture she portrays conforms to a rich, nuanced psychological spectrum in such a way that hilarious satire gives way to urban irony and the burlesque comedy happens to be comedy of manners. So instead of laughing, we smile, and instead of feeling indignant, we sympathize with the extravagant adventures of those who come and go.

Of the associations some reviewers have made between public figures and her fictitious characters, Subercaseaux herself said of Clínica Jardín del Este:

It is useless to pretend that in this class of village, which is the society of Santiago, not to try to discover that Alberto Larraín is Juan de los Palotes, or that Pila is identical to Juanita Perez. But I love that that happens, because it turns my characters into flesh and blood.

Her works have been translated into several languages, including English, German, Korean, French, Dutch, Portuguese, and Italian. A Week in October: a novel is her first book to be translated into English, translated by Marina Harss.

== Awards ==
- First Prize of the National Association of Hispanic Publications of the United States for best story, for her report "Los hongos de la ira, historia de una larga explotación" (The Mushrooms of Wrath, History of a Long Exploitation) which first appeared in Al Día in 2001, about the 20-year legal battle waged by Mexican mushroom growers in Pennsylvania
- LiBeratur Prize 2009 for Una semana de octubre, award for the best novel of the year (in translation) from Asia, Africa, and Latin America

== Works ==
=== Journalism ===
- Los generales del régimen, interview, 1983, with Malú Sierra and Raquel Correa
- Del lado de acá, interviews, Galinost, Santiago, 1986
- Ego sum Pinochet, interview, Zig-Zag, Santiago, 1989; with Raquel Correa
- La comezón de ser mujer, chronicles, Planeta, Santiago, 1994
- Las diez cosas que una mujer en Chile no debe hacer jamás, chronicles, Planeta, Santiago, 1995
- Eva en el mundo de los jaguares, chronicles, Aguilar, Altea, Taurus y Alfaguara, Buenos Aires, 1998
- Gabriel Valdés, señales de historia, interview, Aguilar, Santiago, 1998
- Mi querido papá, Sudamericana, Santiago, 2001
- Las diez cosas que un hombre en Chile debe hacer de todas maneras, Catalonia, Santiago 2003
- Michelle, interview, Catalonia, Santiago 2005 (RBA Libros, Barcelona, 2006); with Malú Sierra
- Evo: despertar indígena, interview, LOM, Santiago 2007; with Malú Sierra

=== Narrative ===
- Silendra, short stories, Las Ediciones del Ornitorrinco, Santiago, 1986 (reissued by Alfaguara México, 2000)
- El canto de la raíz lejana, novel, Planeta, Santiago, 1988 (reissued by Andrés Bello, Santiago, 2001)
- El general azul, novel, Ediciones B, Buenos Aires, 1991
- Matrimonio a la chilena, novel, Alfaguara, 1997
- Una semana de octubre, novel, Grijalbo, México, 1999 (reissued by Suma de Letras, Madrid, 2010)
- La rebelión de las nanas, novel, Grijalbo Mondadori, Santiago, 2000
- Un hombre en la vereda, novel, Sudamericana, Santiago, 2001
- Reporteras, novel, Catalonia, 2005
- Asesinato en La Moneda, novel, Planeta, Santiago, 2007
- Asesinato en Zapallar, novel, Planeta, Santiago, 2007
- Vendo casa en el Barrio Alto, novel, Catalonia, Santiago, 2009
- Un affaire casi perfecto, novel, 2010
- Las confidentes, novel, Suma/Aguilar, 2010
- Compro Lago Caburga, novel, Catalonia, Santiago, 2011
- La última noche que soñé con Julia, crime fiction, Suma de Letras, Santiago, 2012
- Clínica Jardín del Este, novel, Catalonia, Santiago, 2013
- La música para Clara, novel, Sudamericana, Santiago, 2014
- La pasión de Brahms, novel, Sudamericana, Santiago, 2016
- La patria de cristal, novel, Catalonia, Santiago, 2017
- La patria estremecida, novel, Catalonia, Santiago 2019
