= Werkbund Exhibition (1914) =

Exhibition in Cologne, Germany

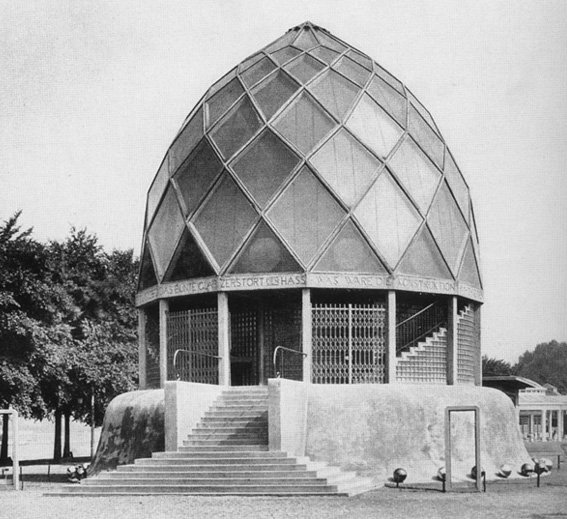
Bruno Taut's Glass Pavilion

The first Werkbund Exhibition of 1914 was held at Rheinpark in Cologne, Germany.

== History ==
The Deutscher Werkbund, was a group of architects, designers, artists, and industrialists whose aim was to promote the collaboration of art, industry, and craftsmanship through education, publications, lectures, and other means. Founding members included Hermann Muthesius, Peter Behrens, Theodor Fischer, Fritz Schumacher, and Heinrich Tessenow.

The Werkbund exhibition of 1914 in Cologne was the first exhibition of the Deutscher Werkbund. It opened to the public on May 15, 1914. The exhibition lasted only three months and was prematurely shut down due to the outbreak of World War I.

== Facilities ==
=== Glashaus ===
The innovative Glass Pavilion was built by German architect Bruno Taut in 1914. Glashaus has been identified as an early example of the Expressionist architecture movement.(financed by the German glass industries to promote the use of glass in building)

=== Werkbund Pavilion ===
The Werkbund Pavilion was a model factory and office building designed by Walter Gropius and Adolf Meyer.

=== Farbenschau Pavillon ===
The Farbenschau Pavilion by Hermann Muthesius was a neoclassical style. The building features a large dome and paired columns along the front facade. This pavilion showcased exhibits for chemical dyes.

=== Festive Hall ===
The Festive hall by Peter Behrens was also a of neoclassical style with resemblance to Palladio's designs.

=== Werkbund Theater ===
The Werkbund Theater is the work of Belgian architect Henri van de Velde. The theater building could be described as a trailblazer for a style we now understand is the International Style. The Werkbund Theater is featured in Walter Gropius's Bauhaus book International Architecture (1925).

Werkbund Theater (1914) Floor Plan

==== Art Contributions ====
The theater housed many contributions from German artists, including the fountain in front of theater, sculpted by Georg Kolbe. The sculpture in the middle of the fountain was a human form standing on one leg in a bath of water, centered in the front of the entrance to the building.

In a different style, Hermann Obrist had multiple sculptures around the theater including two relief sculptures resembling the shape of an eye. Obrist also had two freestanding sculptures, one was a fountain unconnected to a water source. His contributions to the theater had a theme of nature, but instead of being smooth and sleek like the buildings facade or Kolbe's sculpture, Obrist's designs included many sharp points. Van de Velde seemed to debate the addition of Oboist's contributions due to their overwhelming contrast, and the pieces were added just in time for the exhibition.

Some of the other art contributions occurred inside the theater, including Milly Steger's sculptural relief, Ludwig von Hofmann's painted murals, along with Lisa Brentano's painted tiles.

== See also ==
- Expressionism
- Deutscher Werkbund
