= Blanca Santa Cruz Ossa =

Chilean writer (c. 1886–1969)

- Born: c. 1886; Santiago, Chile
- Died: 1969
- Occupation: Writer
- Years active: 1929–1992
- Parents: Joaquín Santa Cruz Vargas (father); Carmela Ossa y Ossa (mother)
- Relatives: Elvira Santa Cruz Ossa (sister)

Blanca Santa Cruz y Ossa (c. 1886 – 1969) was a Chilean writer and editor of children's and young adult literature, with a special focus on intercultural literature, writing and compiling stories related to Chilean and international legends and myths.

== Biography ==
The daughter of Senator Joaquín Santa Cruz Vargas and Carmela Ossa y Ossa, she studied at the School of the Sacred Heart (English nuns) in Santiago.

Beginning in the 1930s, children's literature became prominent in Chile, and Blanca Santa Cruz y Ossa reached her most prolific stage of literary production during that decade. In this context, she established herself as one of the leaders of the genre. In 1929 she began creating compilations of myths and legends of Chile and diverse places around the world. She was linked to other authors of the time, such as Ernesto Montenegro with his 1930 work Cuentos de mi Tío Ventura, Damita Duende with Doce cuentos de príncipes y reyes and Doce cuentos de hadas (both in 1938), and Marta Brunet with Cuentos para Marisol (also published in 1938).

Some of her works were illustrated by Elena Poirier, such as Cuentos chilenos (1956), El duende del pantano y otros cuentos de Bretaña (1992), and La escuela de las hadas y otros cuentos (1992). Her sister was Elvira Santa Cruz Ossa, editor of El Peneca.

== Works ==
- Cuentos maravillosos del Japón (Impr. Universo, 1935)
- Las hadas en Francia (1936)
- Leyendas moriscas (1936)
- Cuentos mitológicos griegos (1937)
- Cuentos húngaros (1937)
- Cuentos africanos (1939)
- Orejones y viracochas: (Diego de Almagro) (1943)
- Sangre y ceniza: narración novelesca de la conquista de Chile (1946)
- Cuentos chilenos (1956)
- Cuentos bretones (1973)
- El duende del pantano y otros cuentos de Bretaña (1992)
- La escuela de las hadas y otros cuentos (1992)

=== Collection of stories, traditions, and legends from all countries ===
- Cuentos rumanos: colección de cuentos, tradiciones y leyendas de todos los países (1929)
- Cuentos de España: colección de cuentos, tradiciones y leyendas de todos los países (Impr. Universo, 1936)
- Leyendas y cuentos araucanos: colección de cuentos, tradiciones y leyendas de todos los países (Impr. Universo, 1938)
- Poemas de Longfellow: colección de cuentos, tradiciones y leyendas de todos los países (Impr. Universo, 1936)
- Leyendas de la selva: colección de cuentos, tradiciones y leyendas de todos los países (Impr. Universo, 1936)
- Cuentos ingleses: colección de cuentos, tradiciones y leyendas de todos los países (Impr. Universo, 1936)
- Fábulas escogidas: colección de cuentos, tradiciones y leyendas de todos los países (Impr. Universo, 1937)
- Cuentos italianos: colección de tradiciones y leyendas de todos los países (Impr. Universo, 1938)
- Leyendas de caballerías: colección de cuentos, tradiciones y leyendas de todos los países (Impr. Universo, 1938)
- Cuentos servios: colección de cuentos, tradiciones y leyendas de todos los países (Impr. Universo, 1939)
- Cuentos chinos: colección de cuentos, tradiciones y leyendas de todos los países (Impr. Universo, 1936 and 1940)
