= Hjalmar Bergström (writer) =

Danish writer and educator

Hjalmar Bergström, sometimes given as Hjalmar Bergstrøm, (1 August 1868 – 28 March 1914) was a Danish writer and educator. His output included short stories, novels, and plays.

== Life and career ==
Born in Copenhagen, Bergström began his professional life as a teacher at the Niels Brock Copenhagen Business College after completing his university studies in 1893. He remained in that post until 1905 when he decided to leave teaching in order devote himself entirely to writing.

Bergström's first work was a volume of short stories entitled Vendepunkter (English: Vicissitudes) which was published in 1894 while he was still working as a teacher. This was followed by a second volume of short stories Brogede Billeder (English: Various Sketches) in 1897. Other works soon followed, including the novels Brandte Skibe (1898, English: Burnt Ships) and Der Kong David blev gammel (1900, King David Has Grown Old).

After this Bergström devoted himself to working as a playwright with his first successful play being Idas Bryllup in 1901. This was followed by the plays Møntergade 39 (1903), Langaard & Co. (1905), Karen Bornemann (1907), and Det gyldne Skind (1908); the latter of which was extremely successful. His 1912 play Vejen til Gud was barred from the stage by the government censors. His play Karen Bornemann was translated into English by Edwin Bjorkman and was staged at the Greenwich Village Theatre in New York in 1918 with Fania Marinoff in the title role.

In the years 1905-1907 Bergstrøm spent most of his time in the cities of Rome and Paris. He died in Copenhagen on March 28, 1914.
