= Mariana Cox Méndez =

Chilean writer and feminist (1871–1914)

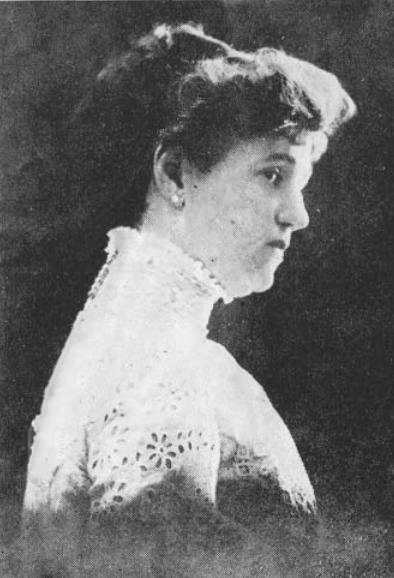
- Born: Mariana Cox Méndez; 1871; Punta Arenas, Chile
- Died: 1914 (aged 42–43); Paris, France
- Spouse: Juan Stuven González
- Children: 1
- Writing career
- Pen name: Shade; Oliver Brand
- Language: Spanish

Mariana Cox Méndez (married name Cox de Stuven; 1871 – September 8, 1914), also known by the pseudonyms Shade and Oliver Brand, was a Chilean writer, feminist, essayist and novelist. In addition to novels and short stories, she wrote pieces in the newspaper El Mercurio, La Union, and La Nación.

Cox was born in Punta Arenas. She was condemned and criticized by Chilean society because she wrote for the media. Her work can be framed within the so-called feminismo aristocrático, which includes her contemporaries such as Inés Echeverría Bello, María Mercedes Vial, Teresa Wilms Montt, María Luisa Fernández de García Huidobro, and Ximena Morla Lynch. Her second marriage was to Juan Stuven González. She had a son, Ivan. She died in Paris.

== Selected works ==
- Un remordimiento: (recuerdos de juventud), 1909
- La vida íntima de Marie Goetz, 1909
