= Elvira Santa Cruz Ossa =

Chilean dramatist and novelist

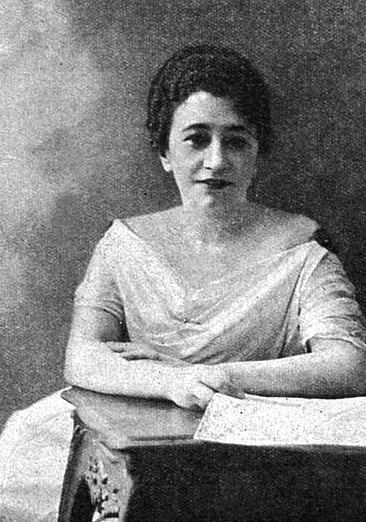
Elvira Santa Cruz Ossa

Elvira Santa Cruz Ossa (better known as Roxane; Valparaíso, 21 March 1886 – 7 November 1960) was a Chilean journalist, writer, (dramatist; novelist), editor, feminist, and activist. eShe was the daughter of Joaquín Santa Cruz Vargas and Carmela Ossa. She was educated in Santiago at the Convent of the Sacred Hearts. She wrote her first novel, Flor Silvestre (Wild Flower), before the age of 20. She also wrote for the magazine, and later became the editor, of Zig-Zag. She edited the children's magazine, El Peneca, for almost 40 years.

Her first play was the comedy, La Familia Busquillas (1916), followed in 1919 by El voto femenino. She produced the drama, La Marcha Funebre (The Funeral March), in the same year. Her second novel was titled Via Crucis Sentimental (Sentimental Way of the Cross).

She was the sister of writer Blanca Santa Cruz Ossa.

== Selected works ==
- Flor silvestre
- La familia Busquillas: pieza en dos actos
- El voto femenino
- La marcha fúnebre
- Takunga
