= Teresa Wilms Montt =

Chilean writer and poet (1893–1921)

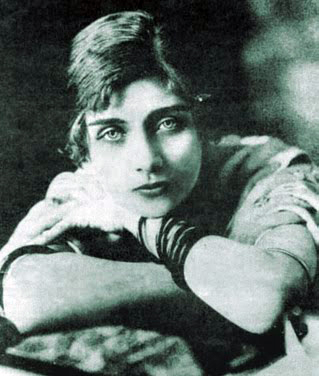
- Teresa Wilms Montt
- Born: María Teresa de las Mercedes Wilms Montt; 8 September 1893; Viña del Mar, Chile
- Died: 24 December 1921 (aged 28); Paris, France
- Other names: Tebal, Teresa de la Cruz
- Occupation: Writer

Signature
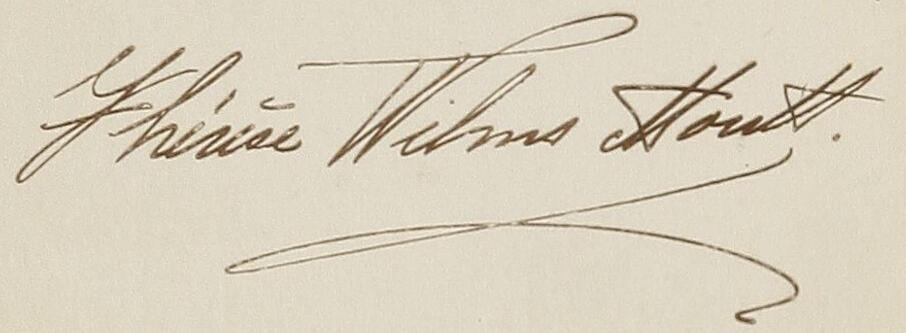

María Teresa de las Mercedes Wilms Montt (8 September 1893 – 24 December 1921; pseudonyms Tebal and Teresa de la Cruz), also known as Thérèse Wilms Montt, was a Chilean writer, poet, and anarcha-feminist. Described as "embodying sexual aberrance and social prophesy", she was a friend of the writers Ramón Gómez de la Serna, Enrique Gómez Carrillo, Joaquín Edwards Bello, Víctor Domingo Silva, and Ramón Valle-Inclán.

== Biography ==
A scion of the Montt family, she was born in Viña del Mar, Chile, to Luz Victoria Montt y Montt and Federico Guillermo Wilms y Brieba. She was the couple's second daughter, and she had seven sisters. Educated by governesses and private tutors, she married Gustavo Balmaceda Valdés at the age of 17, against the will of her family. They had two children, Elisa "Chita" (1911–2005) and Sylvia Luz (1913–1999).

In Santiago, she joined the city's active cultural life.

Between 1912 and 1915, they resided in Iquique because of her husband's work. It was here that she began her relationship with feminists, trade unionists, and Masons, and became associated with nascent reformist movements. She used the pseudonym Tebal when she was first published in an Iquique newspaper. After her husband returned to Santiago, he discovered Wilms Montt was engaging in an affair with his cousin, Vicente Zañartu Balmaceda. Because of this, the men of the Balmaceda Valdés family held a 'family court' in 1915, and decided Wilms Montt's punishment would be to spend time at the Convento de la Preciosa Sangre. Here, she kept a diary and, depressed, made her first suicide attempt on March 29, 1916.

In June 1916, Vicente Huidobro helped her escape from the convent and she fled with him to Buenos Aires. The city's cosmopolitan intellectual circle had a positive effect on her, she became acquainted with writers Victoria Ocampo, Jorge Borges, and feminist-fashionista "Pele" Pelegrina Pastorino. The following year, she published Inquietudes Sentimentales, which was followed by Los Tres Cantos, where she explored eroticism and spirituality. After an admirer, Horacio Ramos Mejía, committed suicide in Wilms Montt's home, she left for New York City during World War I, but, after being accused of being a German spy, was deported to Spain. There, she became the muse of Julio Romero de Torres, who introduced her to the writers Gómez de la Serna, Gómez Carrillo, and Ramón Valle-Inclán. In Madrid, using the pseudonym Teresa de la Cruz, she published "En la Quietud del Mármol" and "Anuarí". Her travels took her to London and Paris, but she resided in Madrid. After five years of separation, she was reunited with her daughters in Paris in 1920 through the efforts of her father, who was on a diplomatic mission. However, the pain of separating from them again when they returned to Chile led Wilms Montt to a terrible depression.

She committed suicide in the Hôpital Laennec in Paris on 24 December 1921, from an overdose of Veronal at 28 years old. She is buried in the famous Père Lachaise Cemetery.

== Legacy ==
Her life is remembered in the 2009 film Teresa: Crucificada por amar by director Tatiana Gaviola.

== Published works ==
- Inquietudes sentimentales, Buenos Aires, 1917, ISBN 9798666236161
- Los tres cantos, Buenos Aires, 1917
- En la quietud del mármol, Casa Ed. Blanco, Madrid, 1918; translated as In the Stillness of Marble, Snuggly Books, 2019
- Anuarí, Casa Ed. Blanco, Madrid, 1919
- Cuentos para hombres que son todavía niños, Buenos Aires, Argentina, 1919
- Lo que no se ha dicho, antología, Editorial Nascimento, Santiago de Chile, 1922, ISBN 978-956-317-245-4
- Obras completas, compilada por Ruth González-Vergara, Editorial Grijalbo, Barcelona, 1994

== Gallery ==
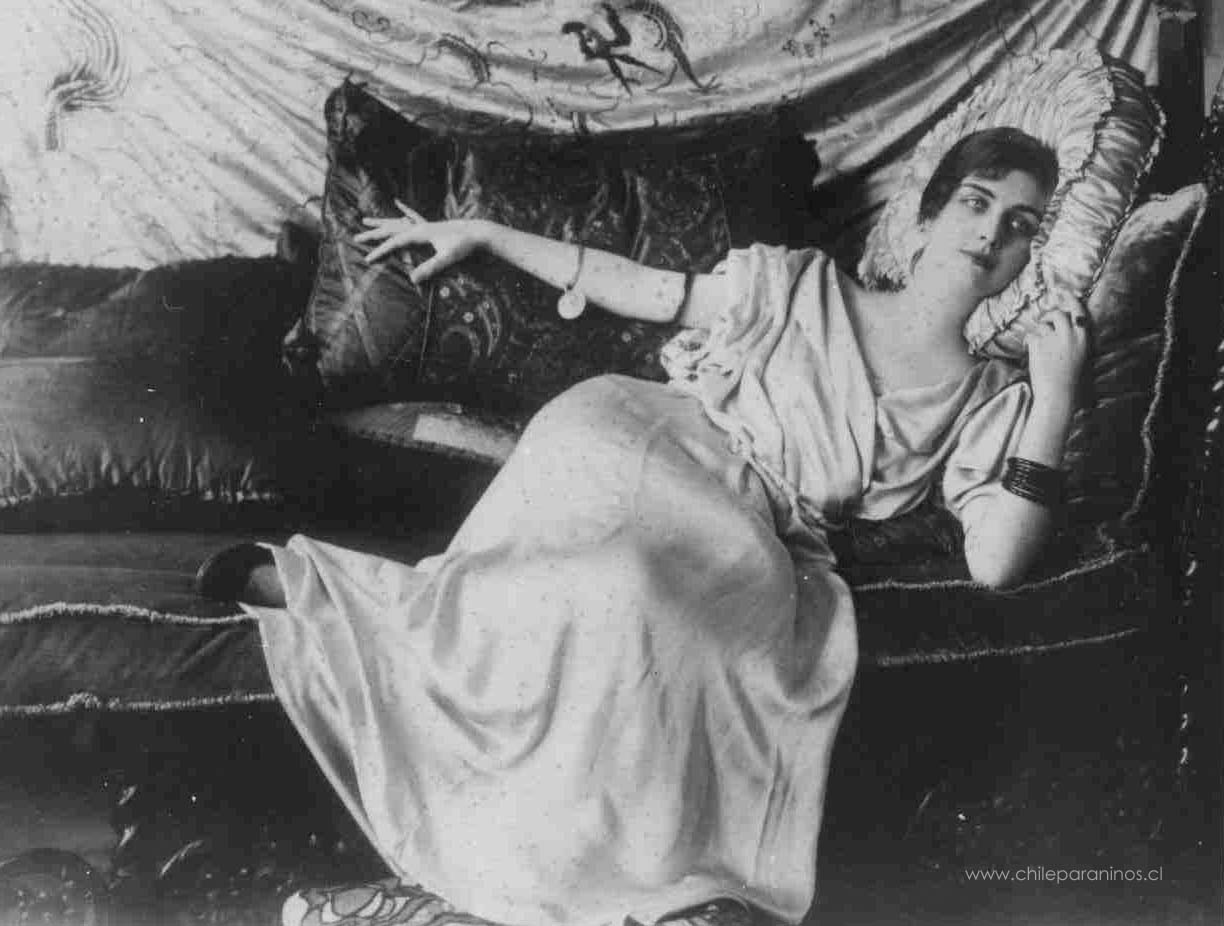
Teresa Wilms Montt.

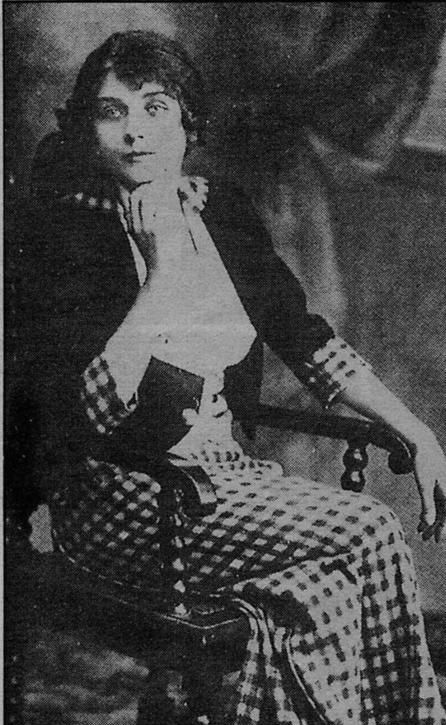
Teresa Wilms Montt (1914).

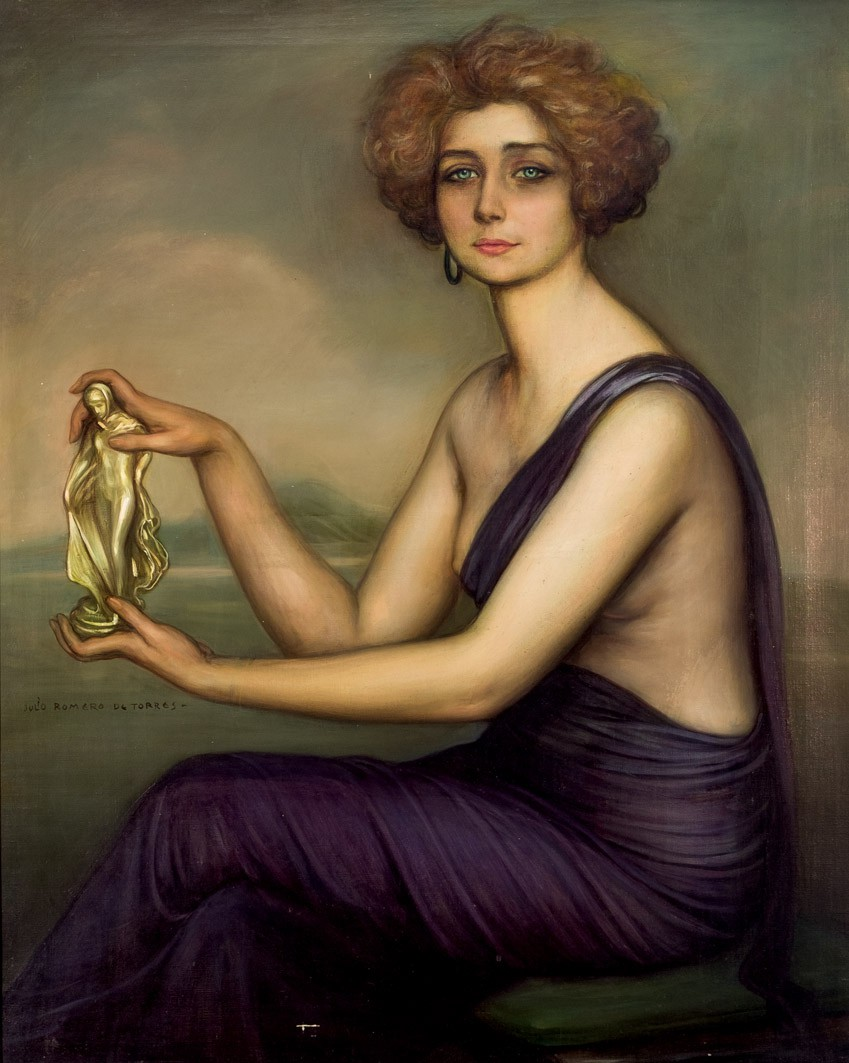
Portrait of Teresa Wilms Montt, by Julio Romero de Torres.

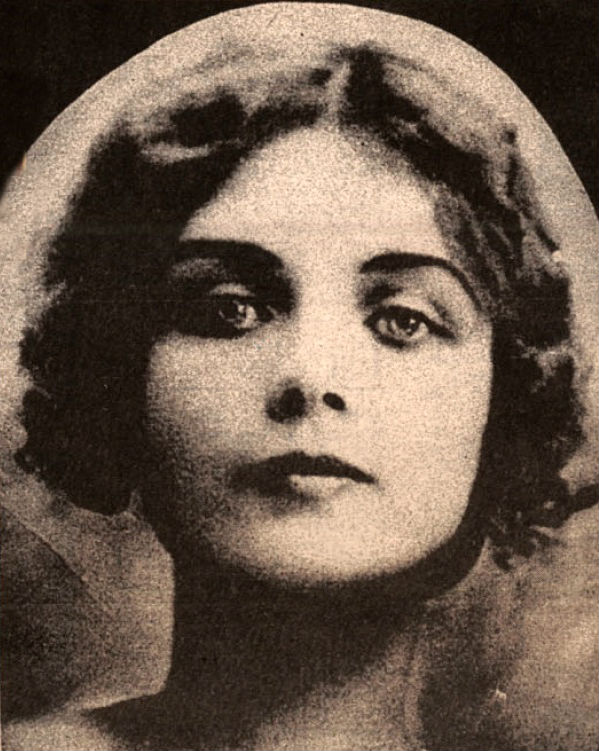
Portrait of Teresa Wilms Montt.

== See also ==
- Anarchism in Chile
