= Santiago Municipal Literature Award =

- Awarded for: Different literary genres
- Sponsored by: Municipality of Santiago
- Date: 5 February 1934
- Country: Chile
- Website: http://www.santiagocultura.cl/premios-municipales/

The Santiago Municipal Literature Award (Spanish: Premio Municipal de Literatura de Santiago) is one of the oldest and most important literary awards in Chile Created in 1934 by the municipality of Santiago, its first edition awarded the categories of novel, poetry and theater (later to be renamed as dramaturgy). Two categories were added soon after – essay, in 1941, and short story, in 1954 – and four other more recently, in 2013 – children's and young adult literature, referential (memoirs, chronicles, diaries, letters, biographies, and also compilations and anthologies), journalistic research and editing. In 2014 it was decided to start awarding children's and young adult literature separately, making it a total of ten categories.

The prizes for the winners of each category consist of a sum of money – CLP$2,000,000 (US$2,635) in 2016 – and a diploma. The works published in first edition the year prior to the contest may be submitted (in dramaturgy, the works released the year before the contest may also be submitted); in each genre, a jury selects three finalists from which it subsequently chooses the winner.

This award has undergone some interruptions during its history – It was not granted during the first three years of the dictatorship, and restored in 1976 under the administration of Mayor Patricio Mekis. In 1985, Mayor Carlos Bombal revoked the jury's decision to award Jaime Miranda's Regreso sin causa and ordered the suspension of the contest, being finally restored in 1988 by Mayor Máximo Honorato.

== List of winners ==
=== 1934–1939 ===
Year	Genre	Author	Work	Photo
1934	Novel	Edgardo Garrido	El hombre en la montaña	
1934	Poetry	Jorge González Bastías	Vera rústica	
1934	Theater	(vacant)	—	
1935	Novel	Luis Durand	Mercedes Urízar	
1935	Poetry	Pedro Prado	Camino de las horas	
1935	Theater	Manuel Arellano Marín	Un hombre en el camino	
1936	Novel	Mariano Latorre	On Panta	
1936	Poetry	Julio Barrenechea	Espejo de sueño	
1936	Theater	Armando Moock	Rigoberto	
1937	Novel	Juan Marín	Paralelo 53 Sur	
1937	Poetry	Juan Negro	Mensaje de poesía	
1937	Theater	Antonio Acevedo Hernández	Chañarcillo	
1938	Novel	Magdalena Petit	Don Diego Portales, el hombre sin concupiscencia	
1938	Poetry	Jerónimo Lagos Lisboa	Tiempo ausente	
1938	Theater	Víctor Domingo Silva	Fuego en la montaña	
1939	Novel	Rubén Azócar	Gente en la isla	
1939	Poetry	Nicanor Parra	Cancionero sin nombre	
1939	Theater	Santiago del Campo	California	

=== 1940–1949 ===
Year	Genre	Author	Work	Photo
1940	Novel	Juan Modesto Castro	Aguas estancadas	
1940	Poetry	Ángel Cruchaga Santa María	Paso de sombra	
1940	Theater	Eugenio Orrego Vicuña	José Manuel Carrera	
1941	Novel	Eugenio González	Destino	
1941	Poetry	Juan Guzmán Cruchaga	Aventura	
1941	Theater	Lautaro García	Una sola vez en la vida	
1941	Essay	Benjamín Subercaseaux	Chile o una loca geografía	
1942	Novel	María Luisa Bombal	La amortajada	
1942	Poetry	(vacant)	—	
1942	Theater	Wilfredo Mayorga	La bruja and La marea	
1942	Essay	Ricardo Montaner Bello	"Historia diplomática de la Independencia"	
1943	Novel	Benedicto Chuaqui	Memorias de un emigrante	
1943	Poetry	Miguel Fernández Solar	Campesinas íntimas y otros poemas	
1943	Theater	(vacant)	—	
1943	Essay	Miguel Luis Rocuant	La barca de Ulises	
1944	Novel	Nicomedes Guzmán	La sangre y la esperanza	
1944	Poetry	Pablo Neruda	Selección	
1944	Theater	Carlos Barella; Nathanael Yañez Silva	Vida, pasión y muerte de la Quintrala; Don Juan Manuel	
1944	Essay	Eugenio Orrego Vicuña; Roberto Pinilla	Los hombres de América; La generación de 1942	
1945	Novel	Óscar Castro	La sombra de las cumbres	
1945	Poetry	Olga Solari	Selva	
1945	Theater	Álvaro Puga	Lodo y armiño	
1945	Essay	Óscar Pinochet de la Barra	La Antártida chilena	
1946	Novel	Jacobo Danke	La taberna del perro que llora	
1946	Poetry	Jerónimo Lagos Lisboa	La pequeña lumbre	
1946	Theater	Enrique Bunster	La isla de los bucaneros	
1946	Essay	Sergio Vergara	Decadencia o recuperación	
1947	Novel	Magdalena Petit	Caleuche	
1947	Poetry	Víctor Castro; Silvia Moore	Laurel despierto Dalias morenas	
1947	Theater	Patricia Morgan; Enrique Rodríguez Johnson	Búscame en las estrellas Mi divina pobreza	
1947	Essay	Benjamín Subercaseaux	Tierra de océano: la epopeya marítima de un pueblo terrestre	
1948	Novel	Antonio Acevedo Hernández	Pedro Urdemales	
1948	Poetry	Humberto Díaz Casanueva	Estatua de sal	
1948	Theater	Edmundo de la Parra; Sergio Briceño	Tierra para morir La imagen y su sombra	
1948	Essay	Hermelo Arabena Williams; Mario Osses	Entre espadas y basquiñas Trinidad poética de Chile	
1949	Novel	Enrique Araya	La Luna era mi Tierra	
1949	Poetry	Olga Acevedo	Donde crece el zafiro	
1949	Theater	Eugenio Orrego Vicuña	Ensayos dramáticos	
1949	Essay	Bernardo Cruz; Eugenio Orrego Vicuña	20 poetas chilenos Don Miguel de Cervantes	

=== 1950–1959 ===
Year	Genre	Author	Work	Photo
1950	Novel	Luis Durand	Frontera	
1950	Poetry	María Elvira Piwonka; Carlos Sander	Llamarlo amor Luz en el espacio	
1950	Theater	Roberto Sarah	Algún día	
1950	Essay	Juan Uribe Echeverría; Antonio Romera	Cervantes en las letras hispanoamericanas Camilo Mori	
1951	Novel	Baltazar Castro	Un hombre en el camino	
1951	Poetry	Miguel Arteche; Claudio Solar	El sur dormido Rapsodia para la vida del hombre	
1951	Theater	Camilo Pérez de Arce	El Cid	
1951	Essay	Félix Schwartzmann	El sentimiento humano en América	
1952	Novel	Daniel Belmar; Manuel Rojas	Coirón; Hijo de ladrón	
1952	Poetry	David Rosenmann-Taub; Juvencio Valle	Los surcos inundados El hijo del guardabosque	
1952	Theater	Pedro de la Barra	Viento de proa	
1952	Essay	Gabriel Amunátegui Jordán; Antonio de Undurraga	Regímenes políticos Pezoa Véliz	
1953	Novel	Jacobo Danke; María Flora Yáñez	Todos fueron de este mundo La piedra	
1953	Poetry	Gustavo Campaña; Luis Merino Reyes	La cima ardiendo Áspera brisa	
1953	Theater	Luis Alberto Heiremans; Sergio Vodanović	La hora robada El senador no es honorable	
1953	Essay	Carlos Vial Espantoso	Cuadernos de la comprensión social and Cuadernos de la realidad nacional	
1954	Novel	Carlos Droguett	Sesenta muertos en la escalera	
1954	Poetry	Venancio Lisboa	Llama viva	
1954	Theater	(vacant)	—	
1954	Essay	Alejandro Magnet; Mahfúd Massís	Nuestros vecinos justicialistas W. Whitman, el visionario de Manhattan	
1954	Short Story	Luis Merino Reyes	Muriela y otros cuentos	
1955	Novel	Luis González Zenteno	Caliche	
1955	Poetry	Nicanor Parra	Poemas y antipoemas	
1955	Theater	Santiago del Campo; Gabriela Roepke	Martín Rivas (adaptation); La invitación	
1955	Essay	Pedro León Loyola	Una oposición fundamental en el pensamiento moderno	
1955	Short Story	Claudio Giaconi	La difícil juventud	
1956	Novel	Guillermo Atías	El tiempo banal	
1956	Poetry	Mario Ferrero Mate de Luna; Ángel Custodio González	Las lenguas del pan Crecida de la muerte	
1956	Theater	María Asunción Requena	Fuerte Bulnes	
1956	Essay	Jaime Castillo Velasco; Eduardo Frei Montalva	El problema comunista La verdad tiene su hora	
1956	Short Story	José Donoso	Veraneo y otros cuentos	
1957	Novel	Luis Enrique Délano; José Manuel Vergara	Puerto de fuego Daniel y los leones dorados	
1957	Poetry	Efraín Barquero	La compañera	
1957	Theater	Fernando Josseau	El prestamista	
1957	Essay	Mario Naudón; Hernán Ramírez Necochea	Apreciación teatral Historia del movimiento obrero de Chile	
1957	Short Story	Francisco Coloane	Tierra del Fuego	
1958	Novel	Fernando Alegría	Caballo de copas	
1958	Poetry	Fernando González Urízar	La eternidad esquiva	
1958	Theater	Fernando Debesa	Mama Rosa	
1958	Essay	Jaime Eyzaguirre	Chile durante el gobierno de Errázuriz Echaurren	
1958	Short Story	Gustavo Mujica	Las campañas	
1959	Novel	Jaime Lazo	El cepo	
1959	Poetry	Luis Oyarzún	Mediodía	
1959	Theater	Egon Wolff	Discípulos del miedo	
1959	Essay	Jorge Ahumada; José Zamudio	En vez de la miseria Heinrich Heine en la literatura chilena	
1959	Short Story	Waldo Vila Suárez	Un día antes del viento	

=== 1960–1969 ===
Year	Genre	Author	Work	Photo
1960	Novel	Leonardo Espinoza; Enrique Lafourcade	Puerto Engaño; La fiesta del rey Acab	
1960	Poetry	Braulio Arenas	Poemas	
1960	Theater	Alejandro Sieveking	Parecido a la felicidad	
1960	Essay	Alberto Baltra	Crecimiento económico de América Latina	
1960	Short Story	Enrique Bunster	Aroma de Polinesia	
1961	Novel	Armando Cassigoli; Hernán Jaramillo	Ángeles bajo la lluvia Crónica del hombre	
1961	Poetry	Juvencio Valle	Del monte a la ladera	
1961	Theater	Sergio Vodanović	Deja que los perros ladren	
1961	Essay	Jorge Millas	Ensayos sobre la historia espiritual de Occidente	
1961	Short Story	Maité Allamand; Poli Délano	El funeral del diablo Gente solitaria	
1962	Novel	Edesio Alvarado Barceló	La captura	
1962	Poetry	Jorge Teillier	El árbol de la memoria	
1962	Theater	Luis Alberto Heiremans	Versos de ciego	
1962	Essay	Roque Esteban Scarpa	Thomas Mann: una personalidad en una obra	
1962	Short Story	Jorge Edwards	Gente de la ciudad	
1963	Novel	Marta Vergara	Memorias de una mujer irreverente	
1963	Poetry	Eduardo Anguita; Víctor Franzani	El poliedro y el mar Largo amar	
1963	Theater	Jorge Díaz; Egon Wolff	El velero en la botella Esas 49 estrellas	
1963	Essay	Esperanza Aguilar	Eliot, el hombre, no el gato viejo	
1963	Short Story	Marta Jara	Surazo	
1964	Novel	Miguel Ángel Padilla; José Miguel Varas	Don Judas Romero; Porai	
1964	Poetry	Miguel Arteche	Destierros y tinieblas	
1964	Theater	Isidora Aguirre; Enrique Moletto (writing as Molleto)	Los papeleros El sótano	
1964	Essay	Carlos Aramayo Alzérreca; Miguel Serrano	Breve historia de la Antártida; La serpiente del paraíso	
1964	Short Story	Carlos Rozas Larraín	Barco negro	
1965	Novel	Fernando Rivas	Los últimos días	
1965	Poetry	Gonzalo Rojas	Contra la muerte	
1965	Theater	María Asunción Requena; Sergio Vodanović	Ayayema; Viña: Tres comedias en traje de baño	
1965	Essay	Luis Oyarzún		
1965	Short Story	Enrique Lihn	Agua de arroz	
1966	Novel	Enrique Lafourcade	Novela de Navidad	
1966	Poetry	Mahfúd Massís	El libro de los astros apagados	
1966	Theater	Juan Guzmán Améstica	El Wurlitzer	
1966	Essay	Mario Ferrero Mate de Luna	Premios Nacionales de Literatura	
1966	Short Story	Hernán Poblete Varas; Nicasio Tangol	Rosenthal; Mayachka	
1967	Novel	Hernán Valdés	Cuerpo creciente	
1967	Poetry	Fernando Lamberg	Estrofas del jardín	
1967	Theater	Manuel Arellano Marín		
1967	Essay	Rodolfo Oroz; Benjamín Viel	La lengua castellana en Chile; La explosión demográfica	
1967	Short Story	Guillermo Blanco; Lautaro Cárcamo	Cuero de diablo Juan de los perros	
1968	Novel	Rodrigo Quijada and Rodrigo Baño	Tiempo de arañas	
1968	Poetry	Homero Arce; Ernesto Murillo	El árbol y otras hojas Salar	
1968	Theater	Fernando Cuadra	La niña en la palomera	
1968	Essay	Fernando Alegría; Mario Rodríguez Fernández	Literatura chilena del siglo XX; El modernismo en Chile y en Latinoamérica	
1968	Short Story	Benjamín Morgado	Nueve cuentos	
1969	Novel	Poli Délano	Cambalache	
1969	Poetry	Olga Acevedo	La víspera irresistible	
1969	Theater	José Pineda and Alejandro Sieveking	Peligro a 50 metros	
1969	Essay	Cedomil Goic	La novela chilena	
1969	Short Story	Germán Arias Morales; Julio Flores	No ha lugar Narraciones de la Isla de Pascua	

=== 1970–1979 ===
Year	Genre	Author	Work	Photo
1970	Novel	Gonzalo Drago	La esperanza no se extingue	
1970	Poetry	Enrique Lihn	La musiquilla de las pobres esferas	
1970	Theater	Egon Wolff	El signo de Caín	
1970	Essay	Volodia Teitelboim	Hombre y hombre	
1970	Short Story	Jorge Edwards	Temas y variaciones	
1971	Novel	Irma Astorga	La compuerta mágica	
1971	Poetry	Edmundo Herrera Zúñiga; Marino Muñoz Lagos	Oscuro fuego Los rostros de la lluvia	
1971	Theater	Isidora Aguirre	Lo que va quedando en el camino	
1971	Essay	Julio César Jobet; Osvaldo Quijada	Doctrina y praxis de los educadores representativos chilenos Historia y sexualidad	
1971	Short Story	Antonio Benedictino	Poca cosa	
1972	Novel	Braulio Arenas	El laberinto de Greta	
1972	Poetry	Eduardo Anguita	Poesía entera	
1972	Theater	(vacant)	—	
1972	Essay	Miguel Castillo Didier; Jaime Giordano	Antología de la literatura neohelénica La edad del ensueño	
1972	Short Story	Edesio Alvarado Barceló; Armando Cassigoli	El vulnerario Pequeña historia de una gran dama	
1973	Novel	Patricio Manns	Buenas noches los pastores	
1973	Poetry	Raúl González Figueroa	Angélica y las mariposas	
1973	Theater	María Asunción Requena	Chiloé, cielos cubiertos	
1973	Essay	Carlos Charlin; Felipe Pimstein	Del avión rojo a la República Socialista; Hamlet	
1973	Short Story	José Luis Rosasco	Mirad también a los ojos	
1977	Novel	Luis Sánchez Latorre	Adiós, Medusa	
1977	Poetry	Miguel Arteche; Fernando González Urízar	Noches; Nudo ciego	
1977	Theater	Domingo Tessier	Luca Milic	
1977	Essay	Efraín Szmulewinz	Pablo Neruda, biografía emotiva	
1977	Short Story	María Urzúa	El invitado	
1978	Novel	Mario Bahamonde	El caudillo de Copiapó	
1978	Poetry	Fernando González Urízar; Roque Esteban Scarpa	Domingo de pájaros No tengo tiempo (3 volumes: El dios prestado por un día, El ojo cazado en la red de silencio, Rodeado estoy de dioses)	
1978	Theater	(vacant)	—	
1978	Essay	Roque Esteban Scarpa	La desterrada en su patria	
1978	Short Story	Enrique Skinner	Adiós, padre, adiós	
1979	Novel	Nicolás Mihovilovic	En el último mar del mundo	
1979	Poetry	Alfonso Calderón; Rosa Cruchaga de Walker	Poemas para clavecín Bajo la piel del aire	
1979	Theater	Egon Wolff	Kindergarten	
1979	Essay	Jorge Millas and Edison Otero	La violencia y sus máscaras	
1979	Short Story	Antonio Montero Abt; Carlos Ruiz Tagle	Nos vemos en Santiago; Cuentos de Santiago	

=== 1980–1989 ===
Year	Genre	Author	Work	Photo
1980	Novel	Ximena Sepúlveda	El cuarto reino	
1980	Poetry	Jorge Jobet	Sonetos de afecto y pensamiento	
1980	Theater	(vacant)	—	
1980	Essay	Roberto Vilches Acuña	Compendio de cultura general	
1980	Short Story	Luis Alberto Acuña; Eugenio Mimica Barassi	Jarrón de porcelana china Los cuatro dueños	
1981	Novel	José Luis Rosasco	Dónde estás, Constanza…	
1981	Poetry	José Miguel Ibáñez Langlois	Futurologías	
1981	Theater	Fernando Riveros Barahona	Los relevos	
1981	Essay	Juan de Dios Vial Larraín	La filosofía de Aristóteles como teología del acto	
1981	Short Story	Antonio Montero; José Luis Rosasco	El círculo dramático Hoy día es mañana	
1982	Novel	Julio Aldebarán; Jorge Mariano Méndez	Tiempo de arena Los rostros ardientes	
1982	Poetry	Ángel Custodio González; Fernando González Urízar	El vicio Sabiduría de la luz	
1982	Theater	Fernando Riveros Barahona; Domingo Tessier	Mineros y perros Joel	
1982	Essay	Humberto Giannini	Desde las palabras	
1982	Short Story	Guillermo Trejo	La casa del descalzado	
1983	Novel	Carlos Morand	El espejo de los búhos	
1983	Poetry	Renato Irarrázaval; Manuel Francisco Mesa Seco	Interrogo al olvido Armaduras	
1983	Theater	Wilfredo Mayorga; Juan Radrigán	Por el camino del alba El toro por las astas	
1983	Essay	Cástor Narvarte	Nihilismo y violencia	
1983	Short Story	Fernando Emmerich; Ana María Güiraldes	Los lobos y las magnolias El nudo movedizo	
1984	Novel	Enrique Valdés	Trapananda	
1984	Poetry	Armando Rubio Huidobro (posthumous honor)	Ciudadano	
1984	Theater	(vacant)	—	
1984	Essay	Jorge Acevedo Guerra	Hombre y mundo	
1984	Short Story	Fernando Jerez Jerez	Así es la cosa	
1985	Novel	Poli Délano	El hombre de la máscara de cuero	
1985	Poetry	Pablo Cassi	Íntimo desorden	
1985	Theater	Jaime Miranda	Regreso sin causa	
1985	Essay	Ágata Gligo Viel	María Luisa	
1985	Short Story	Osvaldo Wegmann	El cementerio de los milodones	
1989	Novel	Walter Garib	De cómo fue el destierro de Lázaro Carvajal	
1989	Essay	José Garrido, Cristián Guerrero, and María Soledad Valdés	Historia de la reforma agraria en Chile	

=== 1990–1999 ===
Year	Genre	Author	Work	Photo
1990	Poetry	Leonel Lienlaf; Fernando Uribe	Se ha despertado el ave de mi corazón Por ser vos quien sois	
1991	Novel	Pablo Azócar; Virginia Vidal	Natalia; Cadáveres del incendio hermoso	
1991	Poetry	Hernán Miranda Casanova	De este anodino tiempo diurno	
1991	Theater	Carlos Cerda and José Donoso	Este domingo (adaptation of the homonymous novel by Donoso)	
1991	Essay	Jorge Edwards	Adiós, poeta	
1991	Short Story	Alberto Fuguet	Sobredosis (Deambulando por la orilla oscura)	
1992	Novel	Gonzalo Contreras	La ciudad anterior	
1992	Poetry	Humberto Díaz Casanueva	Vox tatuada	
1992	Theater	Jorge Díaz; Carlos Morand	Pablo Neruda viene volando Bienvenido a Elsinor, profesor Freud	
1992	Essay	Miguel Castillo Didier	Kavafis íntegro	
1992	Short Story	Lucía Guerra	Frutos extraños	
1993	Novel	Alejandro Jodorowsky	Donde mejor canta un pájaro	
1993	Poetry	Tomás Harris; Jorge Torres Ulloa	Cipango; Poemas renales	
1993	Theater	Ramón Griffero		
1993	Essay	Renato Cristi and Carlos Ruiz; Cristián Gazmuri	El pensamiento conservador en Chile; El '48' chileno: igualitarios, reformistas, radicales, masones y bomberos	
1993	Short Story	Jaime Collyer; Francisco Rivas	Gente al acecho El banquete	
1994	Novel	Jorge Guzmán; Marcela Serrano	Ay mama Inés; Para que no me olvides	
1994	Poetry	Eugenia Brito; Nelson Torres	Emplazamientos; De Indias	
1994	Theater	Benjamín Galemiri; Inés Stranger	El coordinador Malinche	
1994	Essay	Luis Muñoz González and Dieter Oelker Link; Bernardo Subercaseaux	Diccionario de movimientos y grupos literarios chilenos Historia del libro en Chile (Alma y cuerpo)	
1994	Short Story	Ramiro Rivas Rudisky	Luciérnaga curiosa	
1995	Novel	Ana María del Río	Tiempo que ladra	
1995	Poetry	Raúl Zurita	La vida nueva	
1995	Theater	(vacant)	—	
1995	Essay	Ana Pizarro	De ostras y caníbales	
1995	Short Story	Fernando Josseau	La posada de la calle Lancaster	
1996	Novel	Ramón Díaz Eterovic	Ángeles y solitarios	
1996	Poetry	Jorge Montealegre	Bien común	
1996	Theater	Gustavo Meza Wevar		
1996	Essay	Luis Oyarzún	Diario íntimo	
1996	Short Story	Luis López Aliaga	Cuestión de astronomía	
1997	Novel	Carlos Cerda	Una casa vacía	
1997	Poetry	Elicura Chihuailaf; Hernán Montealegre	De sueños azules y contrasueños De mundo en mundo	
1997	Theater	Ramón Griffero	Río abajo	
1997	Essay	Jorge Larraín Ibáñez; Volodia Teitelboim	Modernidad, razón e identidad en América Latina; Los dos Borges	
1997	Short Story	Mario Banic	Cuentos del Limarí	
1998	Novel	Guido Eytel Lagos	Casas en el agua	
1998	Poetry	Alfonso Calderón	Una bujía a pleno sol	
1998	Theater	Jorge Díaz	La marejada	
1998	Essay	Tomás Moulian	Chile actual: anatomía de un mito	
1998	Short Story	Roberto Bolaño	Llamadas telefónicas	
1999	Novel	Hernán Rivera Letelier	Fatamorgana de amor con banda de música	
1999	Poetry	Efraín Barquero	La mesa de la tierra	
1999	Theater	Marco Antonio de la Parra	La vida privada / La puta madre	
1999	Essay	Alfredo Jocelyn-Holt	El Chile perplejo. Del avanzar sin transar al transar sin parar	
1999	Short Story	Jaime Collyer	La bestia en casa	

=== 2000–2009 ===
Year	Genre	Author	Work	Photo
2000	Novel	Jorge Guzmán	La ley del gallinero	
2000	Poetry	Antonio Campaña	Salón de baile	
2000	Theater	Benjamín Galemiri	El amor intelectual	
2000	Essay	Gabriel Salazar and Julio Pinto	Historia Contemporánea de Chile, Volumes I and II	
2000	Short Story	Germán Marín	Conversaciones para solitarios	
2001	Novel	Adolfo Couve; Mauricio Wacquez	Cuando pienso en mi falta de cabeza Epifanía de una sombra	
2001	Poetry	Roberto Bolaño; Juan Pablo Riveros	Los perros románticos Libro del frío	
2001	Theater	Luis Rivano	Escucho discos de Al Jolson, mamá	
2001	Essay	Félix Schwartzmann	Historia del universo y conciencia	
2001	Short Story	Mauricio Electorat; Gonzalo Contreras	Nunca fui a Tijuana y otros cuentos Los indicados	
2002	Novel	Ramón Díaz Eterovic	El ojo del alma	
2002	Poetry	Andrés Anwandter Agüero	Especies intencionales	
2002	Theater	Jorge Díaz; Juan Radrigán	El desvarío El exilio de la mujer desnuda	
2002	Essay	Carlos Franz	La muralla enterrada	
2002	Short Story	Carolina Rivas	Dama en el jardín	
2003	Novel	Nona Fernández	Mapocho	
2003	Poetry	Marina Arrate	Trapecio	
2003	Theater	Benjamín Galemiri	El principio de la fe	
2003	Essay	Norbert Lechner	Las sombras del mañana, la dimensión subjetiva de la política	
2003	Short Story	Marcelo Simonetti	El abanico de madame Czechowska	
2004	Novel	Antonio Skármeta	El baile de la victoria	
2004	Poetry	Malú Urriola	Nada	
2004	Theater	Nelson Brodt	Siete golpes de arena	
2004	Essay	José Bengoa	Historia de los antiguos mapuches del sur	
2004	Short Story	Jorge Calvo; Juan Ignacio Colil	Fin de la inocencia Ocho relatos	
2005	Novel	Roberto Bolaño	2666	
2005	Poetry	Nicolás Miquea Cañas	Libro de Atanasio Beley	
2005	Essay	Alfredo Jocelyn-Holt	General History of Chile, Volume II: Los césares perdidos	
2005	Short Story	Carlos Iturra	Pretérito presente	
2005	Narrativa infantil	Ana María del Río	Lita, la niña del fin del mundo	
2006	Novel	Reinaldo Marchant	Las vírgenes no llegarán al paraíso	
2006	Poetry	Claudio Gaete Briones	El cementerio de los disidentes	
2006	Theater	Flavia Radrigán	Un ser perfectamente ridículo	
2006	Essay	Fernando Emmerich	Las palabras y los días	
2006	Short Story	Jaime Collyer	La voz del amo	
2007	Novel	Ramón Díaz Eterovic	El segundo deseo	
2007	Poetry	David Bustos Muñoz	Peces de colores	
2007	Essay	José Bengoa	La comunidad reclamada. Identidades, utopías y memorias en la sociedad chilena actual	
2007	Short Story	José Miguel Varas	El seductor	
2008	Novel	Nona Fernández	Av. 10 de Julio Huamachuco	
2008	Poetry	Erick Pohlhammer	Vírgenes de Chile	
2008	Theater	Luis Barrales Guzmán	H. P. (Hans Pozo)	
2008	Essay	Jaime Lizama López	La ciudad fragmentada	
2008	Short Story	Sonia González Valdenegro	La preciosa vida que soñamos	
2009	Novel	Roberto Brodsky	Bosque quemado	
2009	Poetry	Juan Cristóbal Romero	Rodas	
2009	Essay	Alfredo Jocelyn-Holt	General History of Chile, Volume III: Amos, señores y patricios	
2009	Short Story	Carlos Iturra	Crimen y perdón	

=== 2010–present ===
Year	Genre	Author	Work	Photo
2010	Novel	Germán Marín	La segunda mano	
2010	Poetry	Camilo Brodsky	Whitechapel	
2010	Theater	Juan Claudio Burgos	Porque sólo tengo el cuerpo para defender este coto	
2010	Essay	Alfonso Calderón	El vicio de escribir	
2010	Short Story	Ramiro Rivas Rudisky	En malos pasos	
2011	Novel	Álvaro Bisama	Estrellas muertas	
2011	Poetry	Víctor López Zumelzu	Guía para perderse en la ciudad	
2011	Essay	José Santos Herceg	Conflicto de representaciones. América Latina como lugar para la filosofía	
2011	Short Story	Pablo Toro Olivos	Hombres maravillosos y vulnerables	
2011	Children's and Young Adult Narrative	Paloma Valdivia Barría	Es así	
2012	Novel	Antonio Ostornol	Dubrovnik	
2012	Poetry	Roxana Miranda Rupailaf	Shumpall	
2012	Theater	Ximena Carrera	Medusa	
2012	Essay	Carla Cordua	Pasar la raya	
2012	Short Story	Juan Pablo Roncone	Hermano Ciervo	
2013	Novel	Matías Celedón	La filial	
2013	Poetry	Gloria Dünkler	Spandau	
2013	Dramaturgy	Guillermo Calderón	Teatro, Volumes I (Neva, Diciembre, Clase) and II (Villa, Discurso, Beben)	
2013	Essay	Alberto Mayol	El derrumbe del modelo	
2013	Short Story	Benjamín Labatut	La Antártica empieza aquí	
2013	Children's and Young Adult Narrative	Pedro Peirano	El club de los juguetes perdidos	
2013	Referential	Roberto Merino	Todo Santiago. Crónicas de la ciudad	
2013	Journalistic Investigation	Javier Rebolledo	La danza de los cuervos	
2013	Editing	Editorial Amanuta		
2014	Novel	Patricio Jara	Geología de un planeta desierto	
2014	Poetry	Carlos Cociña	El margen de la propia vida	
2014	Dramaturgy	Leyla Selman; Leonardo González Torres	El pájaro de Chile y otra gente posible (published work); Las nanas (unpublished work)	
2014	Essay	Pía Montalva	Tejidos blandos. Indumentaria y violencia política en Chile, 1973–1990	
2014	Short Story	Alejandro Zambra	Mis documentos	
2014	Children's Literature	Esteban Cabezas	El diario fantasma de Julito Cabello	
2014	Young Adult Literature	Jorge Baradit; María José Ferrada	Lluscuma; Niños	
2014	Referential	Pedro Lemebel	Poco hombre. Crónicas escogidas	
2014	Journalistic Investigation	Marisol García	Canción Valiente 1960–1989. Tres décadas de canto social y político en Chile	
2014	Editing	Editorial Tajamar	The Odyssey. Nikos Kazantzakis. Translation and studies by Miguel Castillo Didier	
2015	Novel	Cristóbal Gaete Araya	Motel Ciudad Negra	
2015	Poetry	Diego Alfaro Palma	Tordo	
2015	Dramaturgy	Isidora Stevenson	Hilda Peña	
2015	Essay	Verónica Cortínez and Manfred Engelbert	Evolución en libertad: el cine chileno de fines de los sesenta	
2015	Short Story	Marcelo Mellado	Humillaciones	
2015	Children's Literature	Irene Bostelmann Torrealba and Catalina Silva Guzmán	Mi lista de envidias	
2015	Young Adult Literature	Lola Larra (Claudia Larraguibel) and Vicente Reinamontes (Vicente Reyes)	Al sur de la Alameda. Diario de una toma	
2015	Referential	Eduardo Vassallo and Raúl Contreras	La cultura con Allende, Volumes I 1970–71 and II 1972–73	
2015	Journalistic Investigation	Víctor Herrero Aguayo	Agustín Edwards Eastman. Una biografía desclasificada del dueño de 'El Mercurio	
2015	Editing	LOM Ediciones	Luis Fernando Rojas. Obra Gráfica 1875–1942 by Carola Ureta Marín and Pedro Álvarez Caselli	
2016	Novel	Pablo Tucapel Ayenao	Memoria de la carne	
2016	Poetry	Felipe Moncada	Silvestre	
2016	Dramaturgy	Pablo Manzi	Donde viven los bárbaros	
2016	Essay	Gabriel Salazar	La enervante levedad histórica de la clase política civil	
2016	Short Story	Paulina Flores	Qué vergüenza	
2016	Children's Literature	Bernardita Jiménez, María José Pérez, and Alfredo Cáceres	La ballena jorobada	
2016	Young Adult Literature	Miguel Vera	1946, nazis en Chiloé	
2016	Referential	Alfredo Jocelyn-Holt	La escuela tomada	
2016	Journalistic Investigation	María Olivia Mönckeberg	La máquina para defraudar. Los casos Penta y Soquimich	
2016	Editing	Letra Capital	Alameda de ida y vuelta by Vicente José Cociña and Vólker Gutiérrez	
2017	Novel	Cynthia Rimsky	El futuro es un lugar extraño	
2017	Poetry	Verónica Jiménez	La aridez y las piedras	
2017	Essay	Diamela Eltit	Réplicas. Escritos sobre literatura, arte y política	
2017	Short Story	Carlos Araya Díaz	Historial de navegación	
2017	Children's Literature	Andrés Montero	Alguien toca la puerta. Leyendas chilenas	
2017	Young Adult Literature	Lilian Flores Guerra	Las aventuras de Amanda y el gato del Pirata II. El tesoro del Collasuyo	
2017	Referential	Antonio Ferrán F. and Alberto Ferrán L.	El pan en Chile. Su historia. Sus personajes. Sus panaderías. Su nobleza	
2017	Journalistic Investigation	Tania Tamayo Grez	Incendio en la torre 5. Las 81 muertes que Gendarmería quiere olvidar	
2017	Editing	LOM Ediciones	Resistencia gráfica. Dictadura en Chile. APJ-Tallersol by Nicole Cristi and Javiera Manzi	
2018	Novel	María José Ferrada	Kramp	
2018	Poetry	Carlos Soto Román	11	
2018	Essay	Adriana Valdés	Redefinir lo humano: las humanidades en el siglo XXI	
2018	Short Story	Constanza Gutiérrez Obreque	Terriers	
2018	Children's Literature	Claudio Aguilero Álvarez and Karina Cocq	La cabeza de Elena	
2018	Young Adult Literature	Alejandra Cabrera Olea	Lazarillo	
2018	Referential	Víctor Herrero Aguayo	Despúes de vivir un siglo. Violeta Parra, una biografía	
2018	Journalistic Investigation	Pedro Cayuqueo	Historia secreta mapuche	
2018	Editing	Marcela Trujillo Espinoza	Ídolo. Una historia casi real	
2019	Novel	Ivonne Coñuecar	Coyhaiqueer	
2019	Poetry	Daniela Catrileo	Rayülechi malon	
2019	Essay	Sol Serrano	El Liceo. Relato, memoria, política	
2019	Short Story	Bernadette Bravo	Stampede	
2019	Children's Literature	Rafael Rubio and Gabriela Lyon	Un día soleado	
2019	Young Adult Literature	Sergio Gomez	Rallo	
2019	Referential	Camilo Marks	El sol del Pacífico. Memorias	
2019	Journalistic Investigation	Juan Cristóbal Guarello	Aldo Marín. Carne de cañón	
2019	Editing	Claudio Pérez	Qhapaq Ñan. Atacama. Trazado visual al Camino del Inca en su paso por el desierto	

== See also ==
- National Prize for Literature (Chile)
