= Reynaldo Lacámara =

Chilean poet

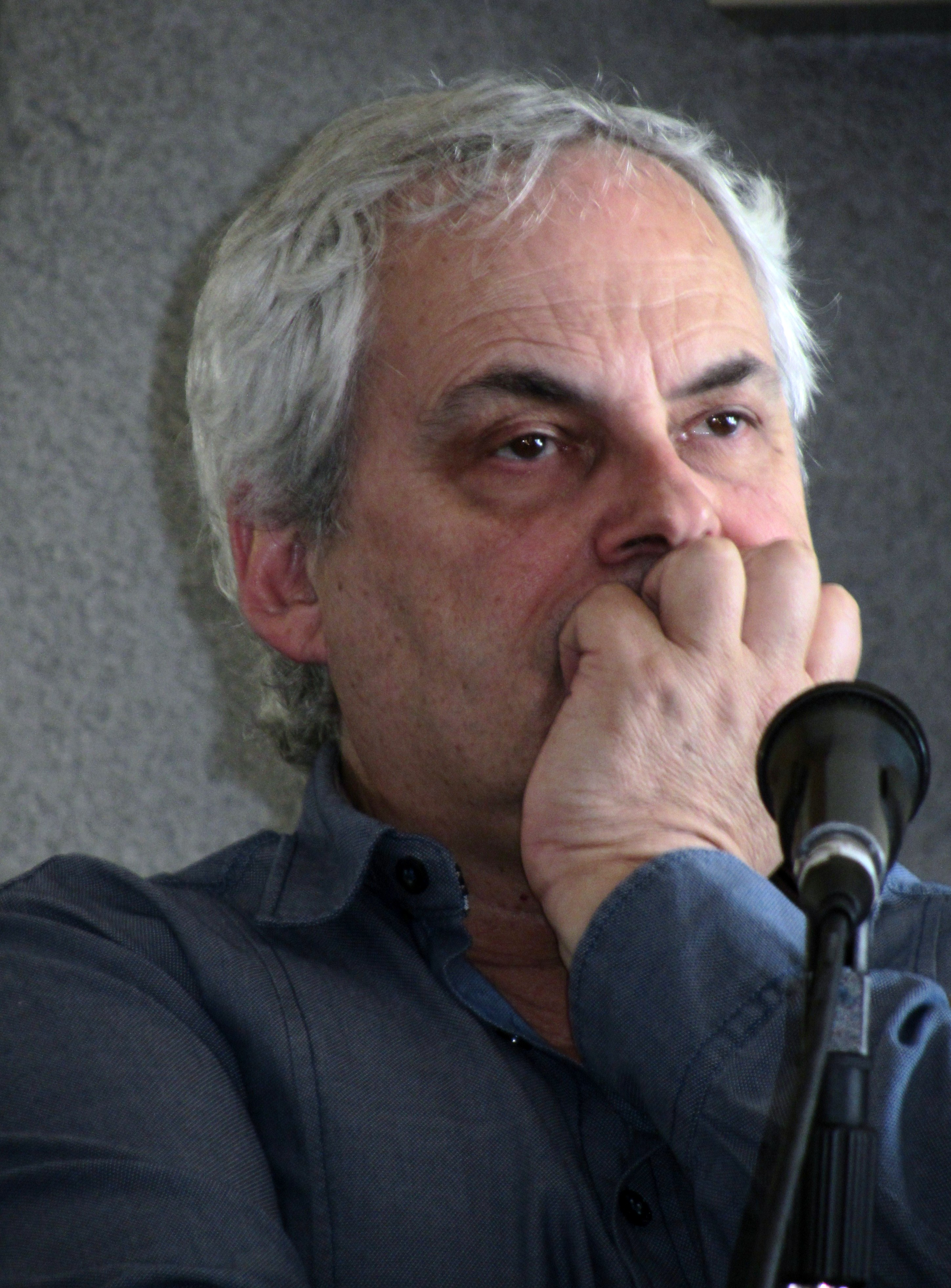
- Lacámara at 2015 FILSA

President of the Chilean Society of Writers
- In office 2006–2012
- Preceded by: Reinaldo Marchant

Personal details
- Born: 19 April 1956 (age 70) Santiago, Chile
- Education: Pontifical Catholic University of Valparaíso (BA)
- Occupation: Writer
- Profession: Engineer

Reynaldo Enrique Lacámara Calaf (born 19 April 1956) is a Chilean writer who was president of the Chilean Society of Writers.

His poems have appeared in anthologies and magazines both at home and abroad; some have been musicalized and included in plays. In turn, Lacámara has been an anthologist in works such as Contemporary Chilean Poetry Anthology, which he co-produced with Andrés Morales.

He has held other positions in the cultural world, for example, he was member of the National Book and Reading Council or vice president of the Delia del Carril House of Art and Culture. Similarly, during the 80s, he actively participated in the Chilean Society of Writers (SECH) Young Writers Collective. By the other hand, in the 90s, he directed the Poetry Workshops at La Reina Cultural Corporation and the Literature Repair Workshop, in addition to being editor of cultural magazines.

== Biography ==
The son of an Argentine father and a Catalan mother, Lacámara was born in Santiago de Chile, but he lived his childhood in Rosario, Argentina. When his familty returned to Chile, he lived in Curicó and Linares. Then, he studied electronic engineering at the Pontifical Catholic University of Valparaíso to later settled in his hometown.

In 2006, as president of the Chilean Society of Writers, he protested against the awarding of the Santiago Municipal Literature Prize to Reinaldo Marchant, who was his predecessor in office and resigned after accusations of corruption against him. Nevertheless, Lacámara was also the target of criticism due to alleged financial irregularities, especially by Alejandro Lavquén, who was unsuccessfully sued by Lacámara, who lost the trial.

Echoing the aspirations of the writers, Lacámara run a campaign to get the National Prize for Literature to be awarded again every year, as in the 20th Century, and stop being biannual. However, during his tenure as head of the SECH, he didn't get the return of the annuity of the main literary award in Chile.

== Works ==
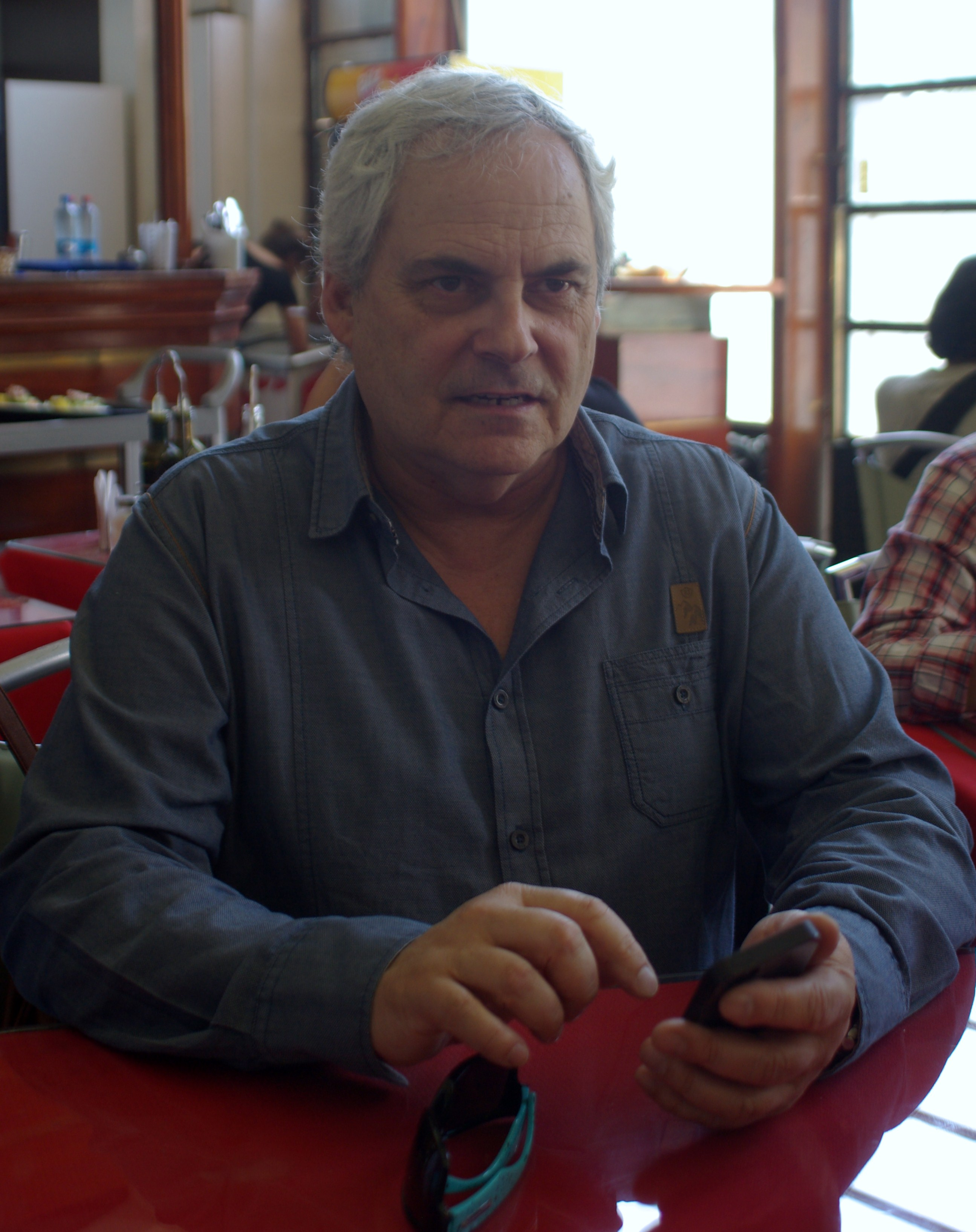

=== Books ===
- Huellas urbanas, poesía, Alcántara Ediciones, Santiago, 1988
- Un giro todo un mundo, poemas leídos por Mario Lorca y musicalizados por Fernando Carrasco, 1992
- Pasajes de otro año, poesía, LOM, Santiago, 1997
- Lota sobre la tierra, poesía, Ediciones del Gallo, Santiago, 2000
- Esta delgada luz de tierra, poesía, Pequeño Dios Editores, Santiago, 2007
- Travesías, antología personal, Editorial Arte y Literatura, Cuba, 2008
- La voz del jardín, literatura infantil, Colección Entre Nubes, 2008
- La columna, poemas contra la guerra, Ediciones Cortina de Humo, 2008

=== Anthologies ===
- Quince poetas de Linares. Co-realized with Fernando Lemus, 1997
- Mortaja azul. Co-realized with Fernando Lemus, 2003
- Fértil provincia. Antología de poesía chilena contemporánea. Co-realized with Andrés Morales, Casa de las Américas, 2008.
