= Ivonne Coñuecar =

Chilean poet

- Born: 1980 (age 45–46) Coyhaique, Patagonia, Chile
- Occupation: Poet, novelist, journalist
- Language: Spanish

Ivonne Coñuecar (born September 26, 1980) is a Mapuche writer, poet and journalist from Coyhaique, Chile.

Her first novel, Coyhaiqueer, won the Santiago Municipal Literature Award in 2019. She currently lives in Argentina.

== Early life and education ==
Coñuecar was born in 1980. At 14 years old, she began to write for a literary supplement of Diario de Aysén, from 1994 to 1998.

Coñuecar began to study law at the Austral University of Chile, but later changed her studies to communication studies and journalism in the same university. She graduated there with a master's degree in Contemporary Latin American literature, thanks to a scholarship granted by the National Council of Culture and the Arts. Her thesis was about the literature of the Aysén Region.

== Career ==
In 2008, Coñuecar published her first collection of poems, Catabática, first part of a trilogy of poetry that includes Adiabática (2009) and Anabática (2014).

In 2018, she released her novel Coyhaiqueer, a book about the queer community in the Coyhaique commune, which received the Santiago Municipal Literature Award in 2019.

== Works ==
=== Novels ===
- Coyhaiqueer (Ñire Negro Ediciones, 2018)

=== Poetry ===
- Trasandina (Ñire Negro Ediciones, 2017)
- Patriagonia (LOM Ediciones, 2014)
- Chagas (Editorial Fuga, 2010)
- Adiabática (Ediciones Kultrún, 2009)
- Catabática (Editorial Jabalí, 2008)

=== Participation in anthologies ===
- Provinciana n.º 2. Revista de Literatura y pensamiento (University of Valparaiso, 2019)
- Con mi caracol y mi revólver. Muestra de poesía chilena reciente (Vallejo & Co, 2018)
- ¡¡BASTA!! 100 mujeres contra la violencia de género (Editorial Asterion, 2012)
- Küme Dungun/Küme Wirin. Antología Poetas Mujeres Mapuche (LOM Ediciones, 2011)
- Voces para Lilith. Literatura contemporánea de temática lésbica en Sudamérica (ed. by Claudia Salazar Jiménez, Editorial Estruendomudo, 2011)
- Lof sitiado. Homenaje poético al pueblo mapuche de Chile (edited by Jaime Huenún, 2011)
- Escrituras de la memoria, reescritura de La Araucana (Editorial Cuarto Propio, 2010)
- Revista Nomadías n°11 (Universidad de Chile, 2009)
- Antología. Concurso de cuentos sobre VIH (SEREMI de Salud, 2004)
- Antología del Primer Concurso de Cuentos Escuela de Medicina (Austral University of Chile, 2003)
- Antología del Décimo Concurso Nacional de Cuentos Fernando Santiván (Corporación Cultural Municipal de Valdivia, 2003)
- Antología poética de mujeres latinoamericanas Voces de luna (Editions Alondras, Canada, 2001)

== Awards and nominations ==
- Santiago Municipal Literature Award, novel category, for Cohyaiqueer, 2019.
