= Niall Binns =

British poet

Niall Binns (London, 1965) is a British poet who lives in Spain and writes in Spanish.

He studied in Oxford, Santiago de Chile and Madrid, and has also lived in Paris and Coimbra. He teaches Latin American literature at Madrid's Complutense University.

== Awards and prizes ==
- Poetry Prize Villafranca del Bierzo, 1999
- International Poetry Prize Gabriel Celaya, 2002

== Poetry books ==
- 5 love songs (Villafranca del Bierzo, 1999)
- Tratado sobre los buitres (Alzira, 2002)
- Canciones bajo el muérdago (Madrid, 2003)
- Oficio de carroñero (Caracas, 2006)
- Tratado sobre los buitres (Jujuy, Argentina, 2009, 2ª ed.).
- Salido de madre. Antología (Santiago de Chile, 2010).
- Tratado sobre los buitres (Santiago de Chile, 2011, 3ª ed. with new poems).

== Editions ==
- Jorge Teillier, El árbol de la memoria. Antología poética (selection and prologue, Madrid, 2000)
- Nicanor Parra, Páginas en blanco (selection, Madrid/Salamanca, 2001)
- Dylan Thomas, Muertes y entradas (selection, translation and prologue in collaboration with Vanesa Pérez-Sauquillo, Madrid, 2003)
- Nicanor Parra, Obras completas & algo + (introduction to the first volume and notes, in collaboration with Ignacio Echevarría, Barcelona, 2006 y 2011)

== Essays ==
- Un vals en un montón de escombros: poesía hispanoamericana entre la modernidad y la postmodernidad (Bern, 1999)
- Nicanor Parra (Madrid, 2000)
- La poesía de Jorge Teillier: la tragedia de los lares (Concepción, Chile, 2001)
- ¿Callejón sin salida? La crisis ecológica en la poesía hispanoamericana (Zaragoza, 2004)
- La llamada de España. Escritores extranjeros en la guerra civil española (Barcelona, 2004)
- Voluntarios con gafas. Escritores extranjeros en la guerra civil (Madrid, 2009).
