= Roberto Merino =

Roberto Merino may refer to:

- Roberto Merino (footballer) (born 1982), Peruvian professional footballer
- Roberto Merino Fuenzalida (1889–1969), Chilean naval officer and politician
- Roberto Merino (writer) (born 1961), Chilean writer and journalist
