= Hernán Valdés =

Chilean writer (born 1934)

- Born: 1934; Chile
- Died: February 15, 2023 (aged 88–89); Kassel, Germany
- Occupation: Writer
- Awards: Santiago Municipal Literature Award (1967); Altazor Award (2006)

Hernán Valdés (1934 – February 15, 2023) was a Chilean writer, best known for his book Tejas Verdes, the first published account of the repression carried out by the military dictatorship led by General Augusto Pinochet.

== Biography ==
As a writer, Valdés began publishing poetry – his first book appeared in 1954 – but he then moved on to prose. His first novel, Cuerpo creciente, was published in 1966, and won the Santiago Municipal Literature Award the following year.

Valdés studied film in Prague in the 1960s. He lived a couple of years in Paris, and in 1970 he returned to Chile by sea. Pablo Neruda was also traveling on the ship, and Valdés brought the originals of his second novel: Zoom. The novel was published in 1971, under the Popular Unity government, and it would be the last work he published in Chile before departing for exile.

On 12 February 1974, after Pinochet's coup d'état, armed civilian agents entered Valdés's apartment in Santiago in search of Miguel Enríquez, leader of the Revolutionary Left Movement (MIR). Although Valdés declared that he did not know anyone from the MIR, he was arrested and admitted the following day to the prison camp of Tejas Verdes (Llolleo), where he was tortured.

Valdés spent a month in Tejas Verdes, and when he was released, he sought asylum at the Swedish embassy. In May 1974 he arrived in Barcelona, and a few days later began to write what would become Tejas Verdes: Journal of a Concentration Camp in Chile, "the best story that exists about the pain of a subject put through military humiliation in the first months of the dictatorship."

After his testimonial book – published the same year in Spain, but only be published in Chile 22 years later, in 1996 – Valdés returned to fiction and wrote other novels. A partir del fin, focused on the military coup of 1973, came out in Mexico in 1981 (in Chile, also 22 years later). La historia subyacente, published in German in 1984, appeared in Spanish, in Chile, in 2007.

On A partir del fin, María Teresa Cárdenas (El Mercurio) has said that "if there is any literary justice, it should be recognized as the great novel about the military coup."

Hernán Valdés was based in Kassel, Germany, after having lived for a long time in Spain and England.

== See also ==
- Lists of solved missing person cases

== Awards ==
- Santiago Municipal Literature Award for Cuerpo creciente (1967)
- Altazor Award, Essay category for Fantasmas literarios (2006)

== Works ==
- Poesía de salmos, 1954
- Apariciones y Desapariciones, poetry, 1964
- Cuerpo creciente, novel, 1966
- Zoom, novel, 1971
- A partir del fin, novel, Era, Mexico, 1981 (LOM, Santiago, 2004)
- Tejas Verdes: Journal of a Concentration Camp in Chile, testimonial, Ariel, Barcelona, 1974 (LOM, Santiago, 1996; Taurus Chile, 2012)
- La historia subyacente, novel, published in German in 1984; in Spanish, put out in a revised edition by Valdés, LOM, Santiago, 2007
- Fantasmas literarios, essay, Aguilar, Santiago, 2005; new addition, expanded and revised: Taurus, 2018
- Tango en el desierto, novel, Alfaguara, Santiago, 2011
