= Efraín Barquero =

Chilean writer (1931–2020)

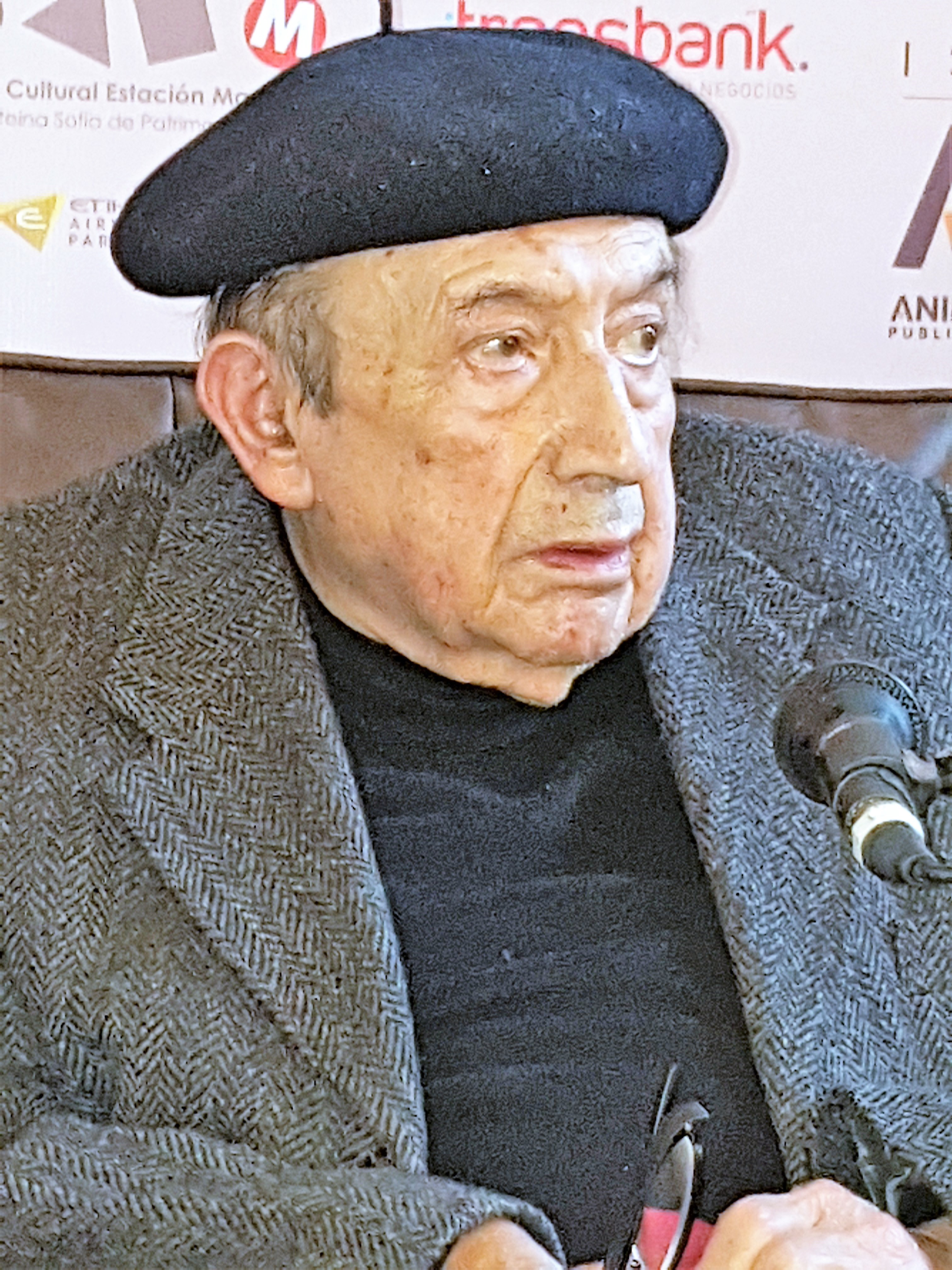
The Chilean poet Efraín Barquero at the Feria Internacional del Libro de Santiago 2017

Efraín Barquero (3 May 1931 – 29 June 2020) was a Chilean poet. He won the Chilean National Prize for Literature in 2008.

== Biography ==
Barquero studied at the University of Chile in Santiago, with people such as Jorge Teillier, Pablo Guiñez and Rolando Cárdenas. Later he worked in Colombia during the government of Salvador Allende. Later he settled in France from 1975 in exile after the 1973 coup. He traveled and lived in various countries of Asia, Latin America and Europe in countries such as China, Mexico, Colombia and Cuba until 1990.

Barquero's poetry is generally about simple things and the wonders of the universe, with social meaning and is often read by children. In France he wrote A deshora between 1979 and 1985, which was later published in Chile in 1992. During this period he also wrote Mujeres de oscuro and El viejo y el niño. Barquero attempted to return to Chile but ongoing difficulties meant that he returned to France shortly after trying to settle in Chile. However, before his departure he published La mesa de la tierra which won awards in 1999.

On 25 August 2008 Barquero was awarded the Chilean National Prize for Literature.

He died in Santiago on 29 June 2020.

== Works ==
- La piedra del pueblo (1954)
- La compañera (1956)
- Enjambre (1959)
- El pan del hombre (1960)
- El regreso (1961)
- Maula (1962)
- Poemas infantiles (1965)
- El viento de los reinos (1967)
- La compañera, poemas de amor (1969)
- Epifanías (1970)
- Arte de vida (1970)
- La compañera y otros poemas (1971)
- El poema negro de Chile (1976)
- Mujeres de oscuro (1992)
- A deshora (1992)
- El viejo y el niño (1993)
- La mesa de la tierra (1998)
- Antología (2000)
- El poema en el poema (2004)
- El pan y el vino (2008)
- El pacto de sangre (2009)
