= Ramón Griffero =

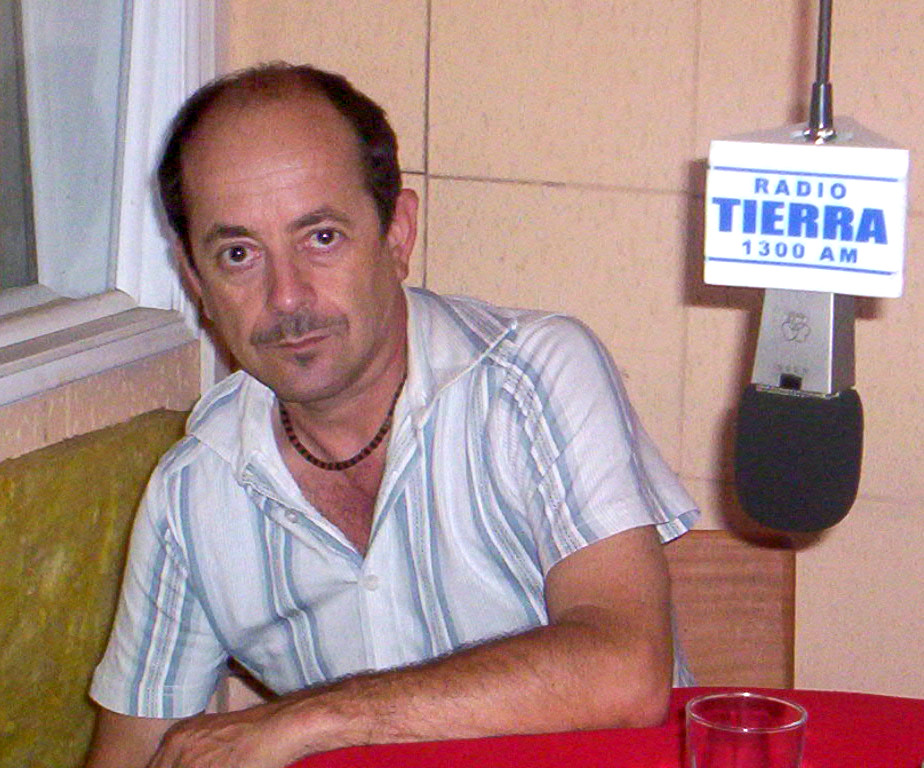
- On Radio Tierra, 2005
- Born: Ramón Griffero Sánchez; 29 November 1954 (age 71); Santiago, Chile
- Education: University of Louvain
- Occupations: Writer, theater director
- Awards: Santiago Municipal Literature Award (1997); Altazor Award (2000)
- Website: www.griffero.cl

Ramón Griffero Sánchez (born 29 November 1954) is a Chilean playwright and theater director, one of the most prominent in his country. He is considered an emblematic figure of the national theater during the 1980s; his earliest productions are associated with cultural and political resistance to the military dictatorship of Augusto Pinochet.

== Biography ==
The son of industrial engineer José Griffero Marcel, ex-midshipman of the Lautaro, and of the Antofagastian Gabriela Sánchez Rojas, Ramón Griffero grew up with his sisters Gabriela Patricia and María Celeste. During his childhood, he traveled extensively with the family, since his mother's second husband was a Colombian diplomat, Nicasio Perdomo Godoy. Hence, he was educated at a dozen schools, among which are Saint Thomas the Apostle, Washington, D.C., the San Ignacio, the Liceo Las Condes, the Salesian School, the Patronage of San José, and the Bernardo O'Higgins Military School.

He entered the University of Chile in 1971 to study sociology, but two years later, following the coup d'état of General Augusto Pinochet against the socialist government of Salvador Allende, he went into exile in London. There, in Britain, he finished his career with a Bachelor of Arts degree in social sciences from the University of Essex.

In 1978, he studied at the National Film Institute of Brussels, where he made the short film L'Escargots, and the following year he entered the Theater Studies Center of the University of Louvain, from which he graduated with a Master's Degree. It was there where he made his debut as a playwright and theater director when, in 1980, he directed his first play Opera por un naufrage, with the University Theater.

Ramón Griffero returned to Chile in 1982, after nine years of residence in Europe. Shortly after his arrival, he began to present works in which he revealed his creative vision: a dramaturgy of strong sensations and scenic breaks, in which the traditional narrative structure is broken by the introduction of language based on poetry. From his first works, such as Recuerdos del hombre con su tortuga and, especially with the works mounted together with the company Teatro Fin de Siglo such as Historia de un galpón abandonado and Cinema-Utoppia, Griffero introduced a subversive dramaturgy that marked a new direction towards greater scenic freedom.

Throughout his long career, with works written and directed by him such as Río abajo and Éxtasis, Griffero has managed to consolidate his style, which has been recognized by critics and the public, both in Chile and abroad. His works have as a common denominator an accentuated plastic character and a recurring use of cinematographic devices. These features demonstrate the experimental vocation of his work, whose spirit of transgression has remained intact even after the political uncertainty of the 1980s.

Griffero has also ventured into narrative, with the publication of a series of short stories entitled Soy de la Plaza Italia. He has played a sustained role as a mentor of new theatrical generations, teaching at various universities and transmitting a critical attitude towards the Chilean artistic scene in the last decades of the democratic transition.

Beginning with his first local premieres, Ramón Griffero developed a dramatic approach that renewed the traditional models of the national theater. His works address the audience through themes and scenic elements that seek to awaken a reflection on the current situation of the country and contemporary society. Issues such as political conflicts and sexuality – married, associated with marginality, humiliation, and violence – are explored through spatial constructions in which the scenography plays an active role in the plot. These innovations are synthesized in the main contribution of Ramón Griffero to the theatrical language: the dramaturgy of space, a proposal whose development was assisted by the set designer Herbert Jonckers.

As a professor, he has taught acting, voice, and direction classes at the School of Theater of the University of Chile, and given workshops. Griffero's works have been performed by various national and foreign theater groups and have participated in international festivals in various countries; they have also been translated and published in a number of languages. In addition, numerous European and Latin American university theses have studied their scenic conceptions. Griffero was director of the Theater School of University ARCIS from 2001 to 2014, and beginning in December of that year he directed the Camilo Henríquez Theater. Since 2017 he has held the position of Director of the Chilean National Theater, belonging to the University of Chile.

Politically, Griffero is on the left, as his work reflects. In his youth he participated in the Revolutionary Students' Front, promoted by the Revolutionary Left Movement (MIR), and in Popular Unity. In 2016 he joined the Democratic Revolution, a party that proclaimed him a parliamentary candidate for the V Costa constituency in the November 2017 elections.

== Works ==
=== Theater ===
- Ópera para un naufragio en francés, 1980
- Altazor Equinoxe, 1981, premiered at Chapelle de Briggitines, Brussels, Belgium, July 1982
- Recuerdos del hombre con su tortuga, premiered at the Moneda Theater, Santiago, 1983
- Historia de un galpón abandonado, premiered 18 April 1984 at the Teatro Fin de Siglo, sala El Trolley
- Cinema-Utoppia, premiered 15 June 1985 at the Teatro Fin de Siglo, sala El Trolley
- 99 La Morgue, premiered 12 December 1986 at the Teatro Fin de Siglo, sala El Trolley
- Fotosíntesis Porno, premiered September 1988, sala Wurlitzer, within the framework of that year's plebiscite
- Viva la república, premiered 12 December 1989
- Éxtasis o La senda de la santidad, premiered at the World Festival of Contemporary Dramaturgy, Italy, 1993
- La gorda, comedy, 1994
- Río abajo, 1995
- Las aseadoras de la ópera, premiered at the 1996 Festival de Nuevas Tendencias under the direction of Cristián Lagresse
- Sebastopol, premiered October 1998 at the Cariola Theater, Santiago
- El ginecólogo de La Legua, 1998
- Almuerzos de mediodía. Brunch (also listed as Brunch o Almuerzos del mediodía), premiered 1998
- Las copas de la ira, 1999
- Tus deseos en fragmentos, 2002
- Fin de eclipse, 2007
- Prometeo, el origen, adaptation of the Greek myth of Prometheus, 2014
- Alessandra, comedy; premiere planned for 2018

=== Others ===
- Soy de la Plaza Italia, stories; Los Andes, Santiago, 1992; 1st edition contains 7 stories; the 2nd, from 1994, was expanded with 5 more; the 12 it contains are:
  - "Soy de la Plaza Italia", "El álbum de fotos", "Las aseadoras de la ópera", "Antofagasta 1888", "El secreto de Berlín", "El retorno de Gabriela", "La gorda", "El sello de la jirafa", "El viaggio", "En la Plaza Roja", "La santidad", and "El niño de yeso"

== Awards ==
- First prize in the Fifth National Theater Competition for Authors for Recuerdos del hombre con su tortuga, 1983
- 1985 Critics Art Circle of Santiago Award for Cinema-Utoppia
- 1988 Critics Art Circle of Valparaíso Award for Santiago-Bauhaus
- Award of the 1989 Radio Köln International Competition for the radio play La última cruzada (Germany)
- 1992 Silver Award (Tokyo) for the educational television script Explorando el arte
- Selected with Éxtasis to represent Latin American theater at the 1993 World Festival of Contemporary Dramaturgy, Veroli, Italy
- 1994 Exitos Award for Éxtasis
- Selected for the 1994 National Dramaturgy Show with La gorda
- 1995 APES Award for best editing, best direction, and best playwright for Río abajo
- Fellowship from the Andes Foundation for in situ research and writing of Sebastopol, on the abandoned saltpeter towns in northern Chile, 1996
- 1997 Santiago Municipal Literature Award for Río abajo
- Cinema-Utoppia selected in 1998 by La Loggia, Florence as one of the best works of the decade
- 1999 Loth Award (Cairo International Theater Festival) – honored for his contribution to contemporary theater
- 2000 APES Award for best editing for Cinema-Utoppia
- 2000 Altazor Award for Cinema-Utoppia
- 2004 APES Award for best director and best playwright for Tus deseos en fragmentos
