= Luis Oyarzún Peña =

Chilean writer

- Born: Luis Oyarzún Peña; 14 November 1920; Santa Cruz, Chile
- Died: 26 November 1972 (aged 52); Valdivia, Chile
- Occupations: Writer, poet, aesthetician, philosopher
- Writing career
- Language: Spanish
- Notable works: Las murallas del sueño (1940); Mediodía (1958); Temas de la cultura chilena (1967)
- Notable awards: Premio Atenea (1953); Premio Municipal de Poesía (1959)

Luis Oyarzún Peña was a Chilean writer and aesthetician. In his youth he studied law and philosophy at the University of Chile. Later he went to London to study aesthetics. Oyarzún was part of the Generation of '38. For his poetry collection Mediodía published in 1958 he received in 1959 the Premio Municipal de Poesía. In 1971 he moved to Valdivia where he was made professor in aesthetics in the Austral University of Chile. He died in 1972 as result of a massive hemorrhage.

Two posthumous original works of Oyarzún have been published: Defensa de la tierra and Meditaciones estéticas.
