= Paulina Flores =

Chilean writer

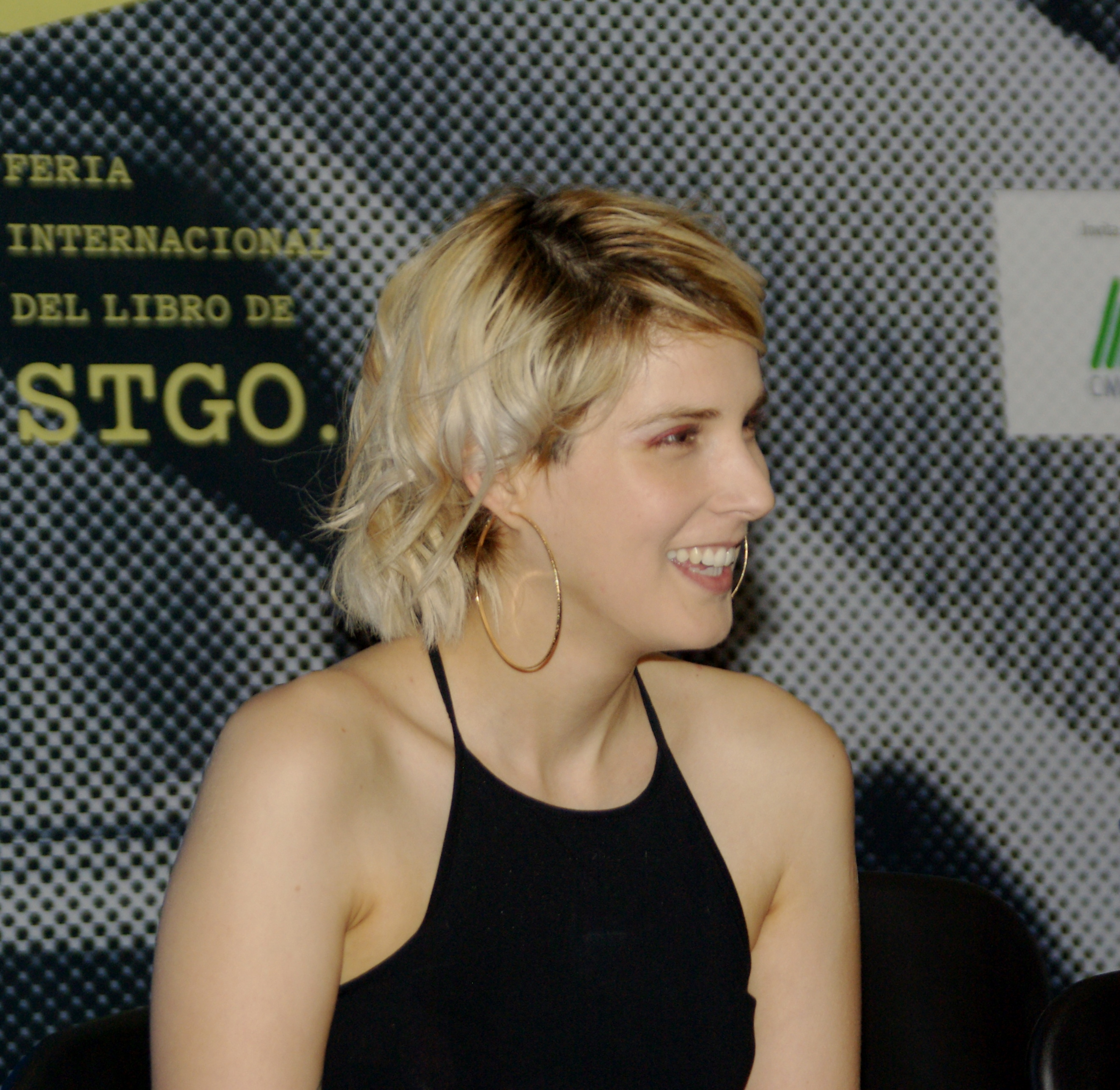
- At FILSA 2015
- Born: 1988 (age 37–38); Santiago, Chile
- Education: University of Chile
- Occupation: Writer
- Awards: Santiago Municipal Literature Award (2016)

Paulina Flores (born 1988) is a Chilean writer.

== Biography ==
Paulina Flores spent her childhood in Conchalí and went to the Recoleta Humanities Academy for secondary studies. She then studied literature at the University of Chile and began teaching at a high school. She attended the literary workshops of Luis López-Aliaga and Alejandro Zambra.

In 2011 she was awarded a grant from the National Fund for the Promotion of Books and Reading, and three years later her short story "Qué vergüenza" was awarded the Roberto Bolaño Prize. Her first collection of stories was published under the same title in 2015 and won the Municipal Literature and Art Critics Circle awards.

== Works ==
- —— (2015). Qué vergüenza (in Spanish) (1st Chilean ed.). Santiago: Hueders. ISBN 9789568935610. Containing 9 stories:
  - "Qué vergüenza"
  - "Teresa"
  - "Talcahuano"
  - "Olvidar a Freddy"
  - "Tía Nana"
  - "Espíritu americano"
  - "Laika"
  - "Últimas vacaciones"
  - "Afortunada de mí"

== Awards and recognitions ==
- 2011 National Fund for the Promotion of Books and Reading Grant (2011)
- 2014 Roberto Bolaño Prize for the story "Qué vergüenza" (2014)
- 2016 Santiago Municipal Literature Award for the story compilation Qué vergüenza
- Art Critics Circle Award for the book Qué vergüenza
