= Marina Arrate =

Chilean poet and clinic psychologist

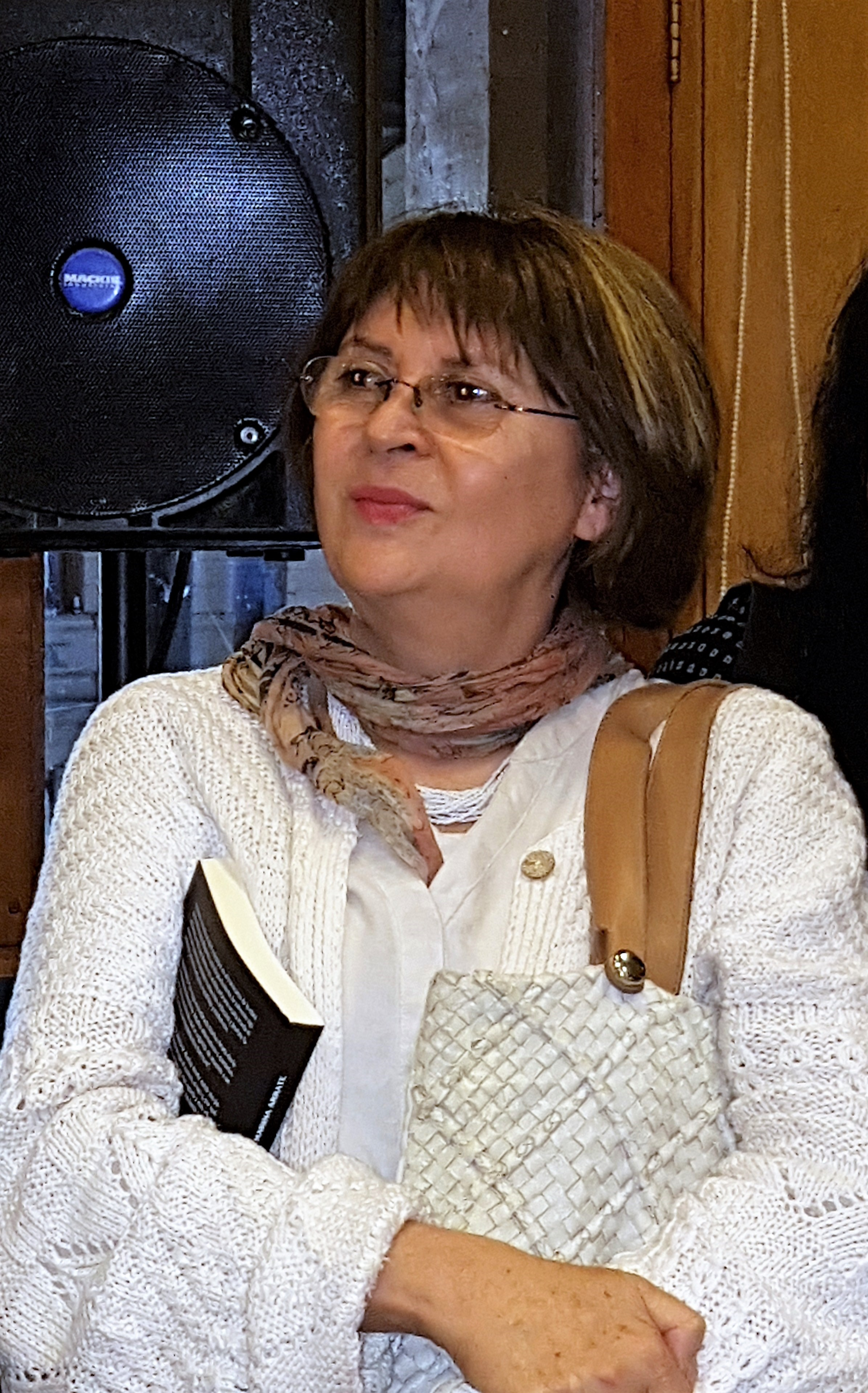
Marina Arrate in 2017

Marina Arrate Palma (Osorno, February 14, 1957) is a Chilean poet and clinical psychologist.

== Biography ==
Arrate studied psychology at the Pontifical Catholic University of Chile, and completed a masters degree at the University of Concepción.

She started publishing in 1985 in with LAR publications, before returning to Santiago where she founded the publishing house Libros de la Elipse. She has also been a teacher and a professor in several institutes, such as the Metropolitan University of Technology and the Gender and Culture Centre in Latin America (CEGECAL) within the University of Chile.

== Selected works ==
- Este Lujo de Ser, 1986, Editorial LAR, Concepción.
- Máscara Negra, 1990, Editorial LAR, Concepción.
- Tatuaje, 1992, Editorial LAR, Concepción.
- Compilación de su Obra Publicada, 1996, Editorial Tierra Firme, Buenos Aires, Argentina.
- Uranio, 1999, Editorial LOM, Santiago.
- Trapecio, 2002, Editorial LOM, Santiago.
- El Libro del Componedor, 2008, Sello Editorial Libros de la Elipse, Santiago.
- Satén, 2009, Editorial Pen Press, New York.
- Carta a Don Alonso de Ercilla y Zúñiga, Memoria Poética. Reescrituras de la Araucana, 2010

== Prizes ==
- Santiago Municipal Literature Award for Trapecio in 2003, and for Elogio del Odio in 2022.
