= Ana María del Río =

Chilean literature professor, feminist writer and novelist

Ana María del Río Correa
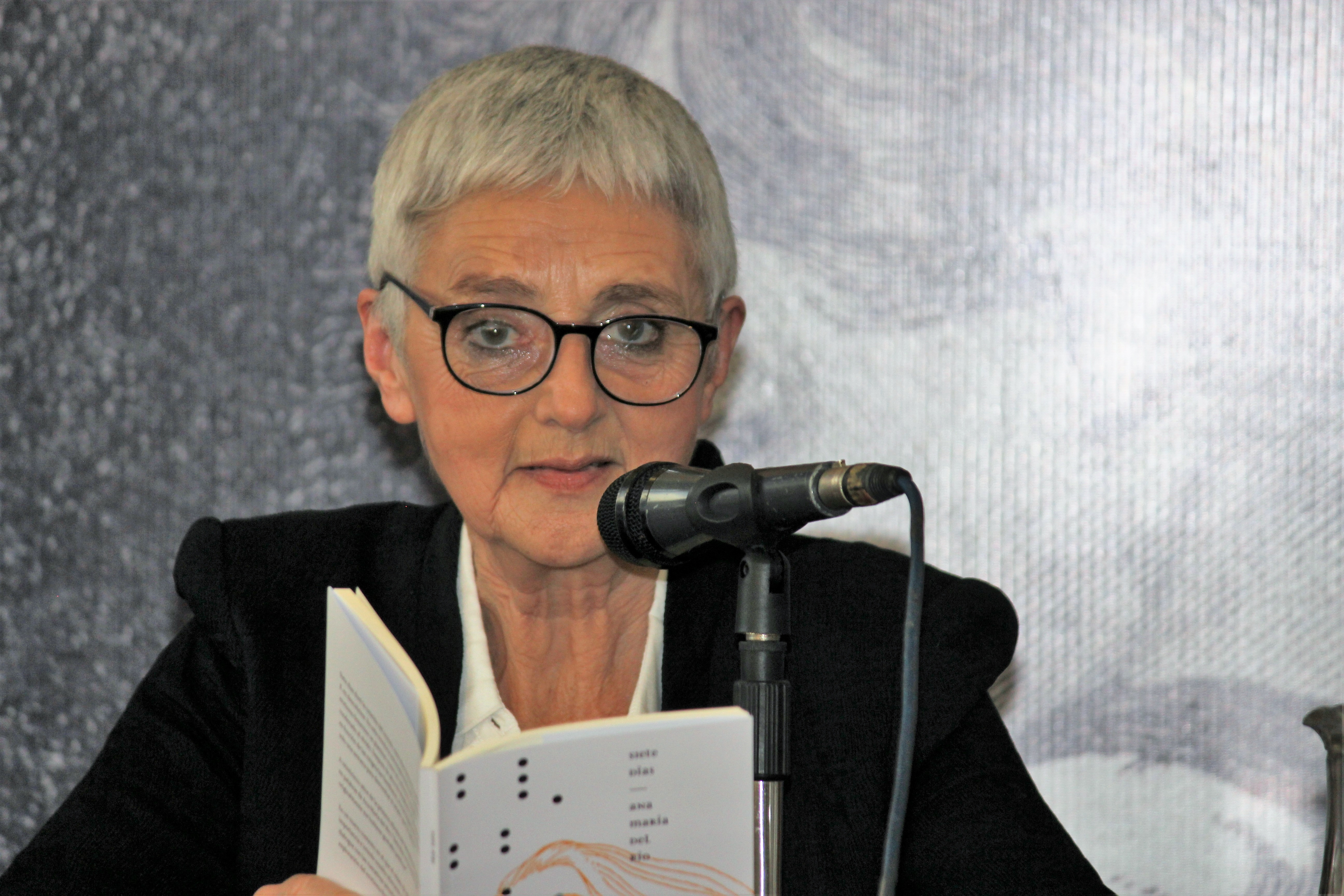
- Ana María del Río at the Santiago International Book Fair 2018
- Born: 1948 (age 77–78); Santiago, Chile
- Occupations: Writer, literature professor
- Writing career
- Language: Spanish
- Years active: 1985–
- Genres: Novel, short story
- Notable work: Óxido de Carmen
- Notable awards: Premio María Luisa Bombal; Premio Andrés Bello de novela (1990); Premio Municipal de Novela (1995); Premio Letras de Oro de Miami
- Movement: Feminism

Ana María del Río (born 1948 in Santiago, Chile) is a Chilean literature professor, feminist writer, and novelist. Her honors include the Santiago Municipal Literature Award and the María Luisa Bombal Award.

== Biography ==
She studied literature at the Pontifical Catholic University of Chile and did graduate work at Rice University and the University of Pittsburgh. Her work has been published in Chile as well as in Spain, Argentina, and the United States.

She made her literary debut in 1985 with her book Entreparéntesis, and one year later she released her first novel, Óxido de Carmen, which deals with the feminine bias prevailing in Latin American women's literature in the 1980s, also visible in Alessandra Luiselli, María Luisa Puga, Elena Poniatowska and Carmen Boullosa's works. and which received the María Luisa Bombal Award.

== Works ==
- Entreparéntesis (Santiago: Arcilla, 1985).
- Óxido de Carmen (Barcelona: Ediciones del Bronce, 1986, 1988, 1998).
- De golpe, Amalia en el umbral (Santiago: Editorial Andrés Bello, 1991).
- Siete días de la señora K. (Santiago: Editorial Planeta, 1993, 1994, 1995; Buenos Aires: Seix Barral, 1996).
- Tiempo que ladra (Coral Gables, Fla.: University of Miami, North-South Center, c1991; Santiago: Editorial Planeta, 1994).
- Bajo Techo : Antología de cuentos chilenos contemporáneos (Santiago: El Ministerio, 1995).
- Gato por liebre (Santiago: Caos Eds., 1995).
- A tango abierto (Santiago: Alfaguara, 1996, 1997).
- La esfera media del aire (Santiago: Aguilar Chilena de Ediciones, c1998).
- Carmenoxid (Frankfurt: Frankfurter Verlagsanstalt, 1999).
- Lita, la niña del fin del mundo (Santiago: Aguilar Chilena de Eds., 2003, 2005).
- Ni a tontas ni a locas (Santiago: Aguilar Chilena de Ediciones, 2003)
- Amarilis (Santiago: Aguilar Chilena de Ediciones, 2005, 2006).
- Cuentos chilenos : una antología (Madrid: Eds. Siruela, 2006).
- La bruja bella y el solitario (Santiago: Aguilar Chilena de Eds. 1999, 2000, 2001, 2002, 2003, 2004, 2005, 2006, 2008, 2009, 2010, 2011).
- La historia de Manú (Santiago: Aguilar Chilena de Ediciones, 2004, 2005, 2006, 2007, 2010, 2011)
- Pero ahora no es verano (Santiago: Random House Mondadori, 2011).
- Un niño de diez mil años (Santiago: Empresa Editora Zig-Zag, 2011).
- Un esqueleto en vacaciones (Editorial Zig-Zag)
- Antologías diversas con apariciones de sus obras: "Historias de mentes". Ed. Alfaguara, 2001.
- "Contando el cuento: antología joven narrativa chilena" R. Díaz Eterovich y Diego Muñoz V. (comps). Ed Sinfronteras, 1986.
- "Grandes cuentos del siglo XX" Camilo Marks (comp.) Ed Sudamericana, 2001.
