= Eugenio Mimica Barassi =

Chilean writer (1949–2021)

- Born: 4 November 1949; Santiago, Chile
- Died: 27 March 2021 (aged 71)
- Occupations: Writer (novelist, short story writer)
- Awards: Santiago Municipal Literature Award (1980)

Eugenio Mimica Barassi (4 November 1949 – 27 March 2021) was a Chilean writer, born in Santiago.

He made his literary debut in 1977, with the short story collection Comarca fueguina. In 1979 he published his next book, the short story collection Los cuatro dueños (Santiago Municipal Literature Award). Further books are Travesía sobre la cordillera Darwin, Un adiós al descontento, Enclave para dislocados, and Tierra del fuego, en días de viento ausente.

He was a member of Academia Chilena de la Lengua, the Chilean Language Academy, from 2014.

Mimica died on 27 March 2021.
