= María José Ferrada =

Chilean writer and journalist (born 1977)

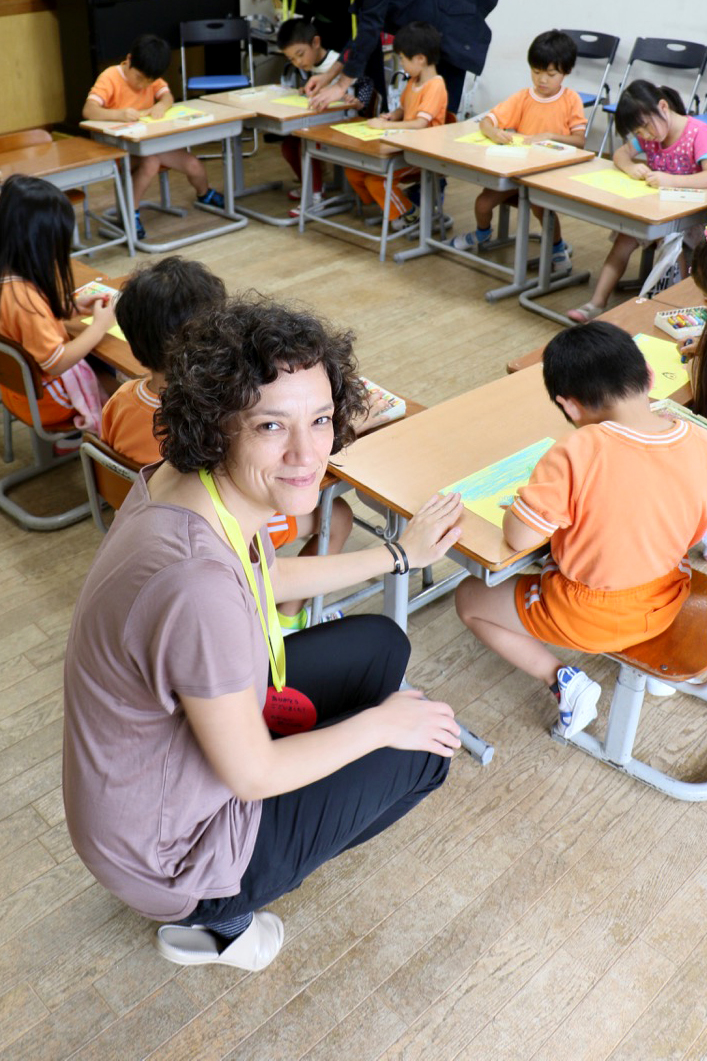
- Born: 1977 (age 48–49); Temuco, Chile
- Education: University of Barcelona, Universidad Diego Portales
- Occupations: Writer, editor, journalist
- Writing career
- Language: Spanish
- Genre: Children's literature

María José Ferrada (born 1977) is a journalist and writer from Chile. She has written numerous books for children and young adults in the Spanish language, and her work has been widely translated. She has received multiple awards for her work, including the Premio Academia of the Academia Chilena de la Lengua, and the Literary Prize of the City of Santiago, and her books for children have been published in several countries, including Spain, Argentina, Colombia, Brazil, Mexico, Italy and the United States, in addition to Chile. She is currently the editor of Chile para Niños, which is the National Library of Chile's digital resource center for children.

== Biography ==
María José Ferrada on the book fair Frankfurt 2026.

María José Ferrada was born in Temuco, Chile, in 1977. She studied at the Universidad Diego Portales, and later at the University of Barcelona, earning a master's degree in Asia-Pacific studies. She lives in Santiago de Chile.

== Career ==
Ferrada began writing stories for her younger brother, and self-published her first book, 12 historias minúsculas de la tierra, el cielo y el mar (12 Tiny Stories of the Earth, the Sky, and the Sea, 2005). She has since written numerous books for children and young adults in Spanish, and has been published in Chile and in Spain. She followed this with Un mundo raro (illustrated by Nicolai Troshinsky), which was published in Spain in 2010. She is currently the editor of Chile para Niños, a digital resource center for children at the National Library of Chile.

One of her most-well known works is a collection of poems titled Ninos (Children) published in 2013, which chronicles the thoughts, aspirations, and lives of Chilean children and was dedicated to the minors who experienced political violence during the Chilean dictatorship. Ninos received several awards, including an award from the Academia Chilena de la Lengua for the best literary work published in Chile, and the Santiago Municipal Literature Award. Ferrada's book Un Jardin, which was illustrated by Isidro Ferrer, was also widely published in Spanish-speaking countries, and won the Banco del Libro de Venezuela award for best children's book, as well as an honorable mention at the Ragazzi Awards. In 2013, Ferrada also published Notas al margen, which won the Marta Brunet Prize and the Colibrí Medal, from IBBY Chile.

Ferrada published Kramp (How to Order the Universe, translated into English by Elizabeth Bryer in 2021), a novel for adults, in 2017. Kramp won numerous awards, including three of Chile's biggest literary awards: the Círculo de Críticos de Arte Best Novel, Chilean Ministry of Culture's prize for best novel, and the Santiago Municipal Literature Award. Kramp is a novel about a young girl who accompanies her father, a traveling salesman, and the people they meet in their travels. Ferrada has described the book as an "autobiographical story," drawing from her own childhood travels with her father, who was also a salesman. The book has been published into Italian, Brazilian Portuguese, Danish, and German, and in English translation. It was listed as one of the best novels of 2021 by the San Francisco Chronicle, and one of 100 notable translations in 2021 by World Literature Today.

Her next novel for adults, 2021's El hombre del cartel ("Billboard Man"), was published in English translation as How to Turn Into a Bird In 2022. The story centers on a young boy, Miguel, whose uncle begins living up on a Coca-Cola billboard. As Miguel spends more and more time up on the billboard with his uncle, his community below deteriorates into mistrust and violence.

In 2021, she won the XVII Ibero-American SM Prize for Children's and Young People's Literature in Mexico. Ferrada has also won several other awards for her writing, including the City of Orihuela de Poesía, and the Premio Hispanoamericano de Poesía para Niños.

Ferrada has identified Japanese literature as a major influence on her writing.

== Bibliography ==
- (2005) 12 historias minúsculas de la tierra, el cielo y el mar (12 Tiny Stories of the Earth, the Sky, and the Sea, 2005), illustrated by Karina Letelier
- Un mundo raro
- (2013) Niños (Graffito Ediciones, illustrated by Jorge Quien) ISBN 9-789-56935-6018
- (2013) Las memorias de Hugo : (el chancho de tierra) (with Francisca Yáñez, Santiago de Chile : Ebookspatagonia) ISBN 9-789-56899-2804
- (2013) Notas al margen (Santiago de Chile Alfaguara 2013) ISBN 9-789-56152-2718
- (2015) El lenguaje de las cosas
- (2017) Kramp
  - (in English) How to Order the Universe, translated by Elizabeth Bryer, Tin House ISBN 9-786-07621-9836
  - (in German) Kramp, translated by Peter Kultzen; Heinrich von Berenberg-Gossler (Berlin Berenberg Verlag GmbH) ISBN 9-783-94920-3084
- (2017) Agua (with María Elena Valdez, Castillo de la lectura) ISBN 9-786-07621-9836
- (2018) Guardianes (with Mónica Gutiérrez Serna, Santiago, Chile : Editorial Amanuta Ltda) ISBN 9-789-56364-0809
- (2020) Mexique: A Refugee Story from the Spanish Civil War (with Ana Penyas; Elisa Amado, Grand Rapids, Michigan : Eerdmans Books for Young Readers) ISBN 9-781-46746-4376
- (2020) Tweet! (with Magdalena Pérez, Barefoot Books) ISBN 9-781-64686-0920
- (2021) El hombre del cartel (Madrid : Alianza Editorial) ISBN 9-788-41362-4976
  - (in English) How to Turn Into a Bird, translated by Elizabeth Bryer, Tin House ISBN 9781953534460
- (2022) My Neighborhood (New York: Tapioca Stories) ISBN 9-781-73478-3957. Illustrated by Ana Penyas, translated into English by Kit Maude
