= José Miguel Varas =

Chilean writer (1928–2011)

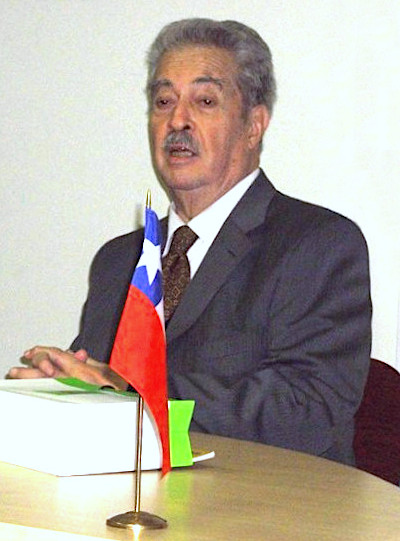
Chilean writer José Miguel Varas in Moscow, during a meeting with his readers

José Miguel Varas (1928 – 23 September 2011) was a Chilean writer. He won the Chilean National Prize for Literature in 2006.
