= Jaime Collyer =

Chilean writer (born 1955)

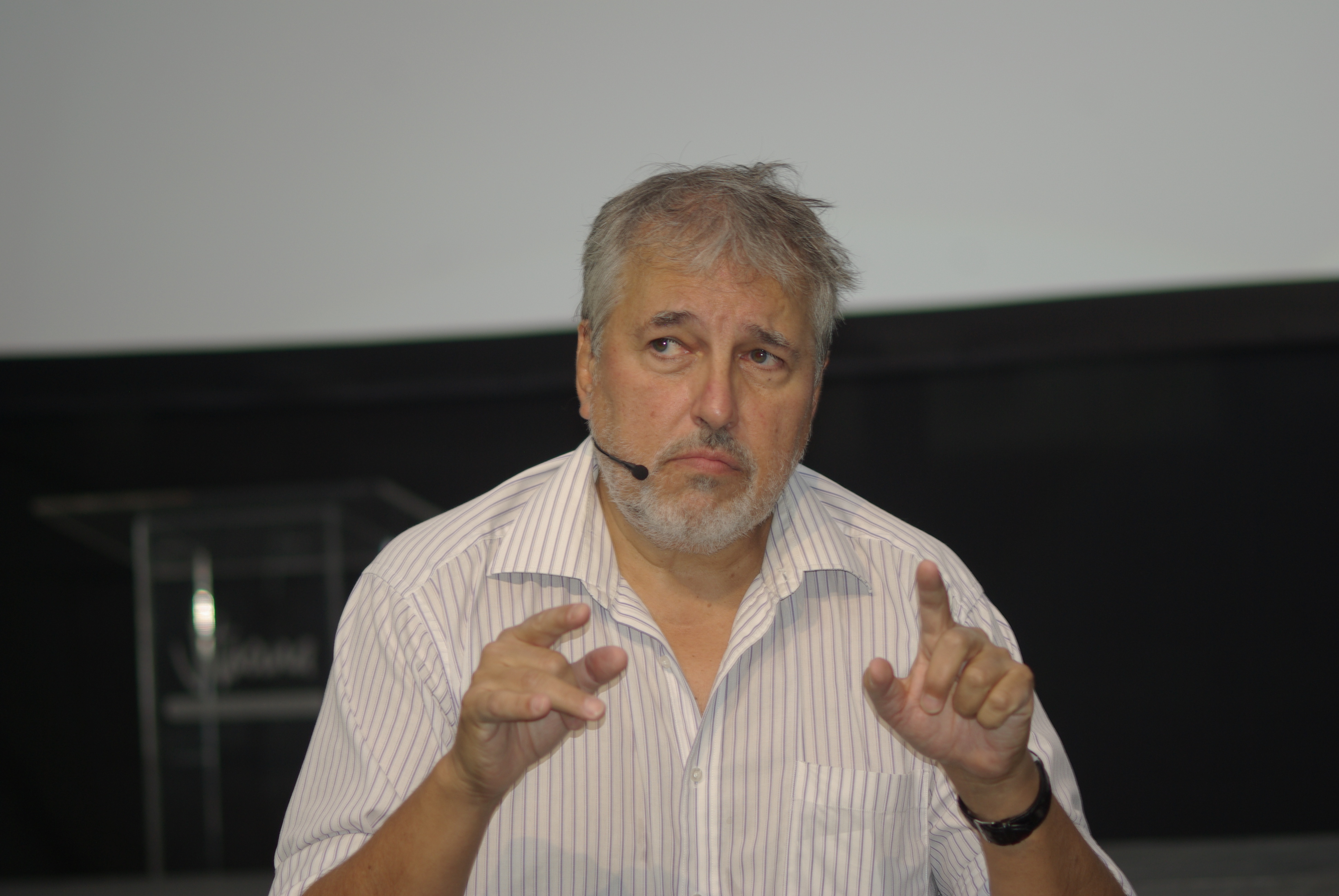

Jaime Collyer (born 1955) is a Chilean writer, born in Santiago, Chile. He became part of a generation of writers known as the "Nueva narrativa chilena" or New Chilean Narrative. His works have been translated into English, French and other languages, winning various literary prizes and acclaim.

== Life ==
Born in 1955, Collyer claims he discovered the joy of writing fiction as a child in school at a young age. Later in university, studying psychology, he realised "the only thing I wanted to do was to write." Having finished his degree in 1980, Collyer moved to Madrid, Spain in 1981 to begin a writing career and to study International Relations and Political Science. In 1986, he co-wrote a children's book Hacia el nuevo mundo, and his writing career began in earnest from there. He published El infiltrado in 1989, which was awarded a prize as the best Latin-American novel translated to French that year. Collyer has continued to publish works to much critical acclaim and has won the Premio Municipal de Santiago for his short story collections, amongst various other awards for his publications in general. The New York Times Book Review described him as "a born writer".

== Influences ==
Collyer cites a diverse and wide-ranging set of influences from various countries and cultures. Amongst them are Rudyard Kipling and Vladimir Nabokov as well as German post war writers such as Heinrich Böll and Günter Grass. Chief amongst his influences are authors of Latin-American extraction, including Julio Cortázar and Juan Carlos Onetti. Perhaps his most salient influence, an author to whom he has been compared, is the Argentine Jorge Luis Borges. Undoubtedly an influence, Collyer was even dubbed "The New Borges" after the release of the collection Gente al acecho (People on the Prowl). Borges is mentioned within the collection in the story 'Ultimos días de nuestro vecino', in which a character comes across the Aleph, a place where all points on the earth can be seen from one point, something which Borges had described in his own short story in the collection The Aleph.

== Works ==
Novels

- Los años perdidos (1986)
- El infiltrado (1989)
- Cien pájaros volando (1995)
- El habitante del cielo (2002)
- La fidelidad presunta de las partes (2009)
- Gente en las sombras (2020)

Short story collections

- Gente al acecho (1998)
- La bestia en casa (1998)
- Cuentos privados (2002)
- La voz del amo (2005)

Children's books

- Hacia el nuevo mundo (1986)
