= Fernando Alegría =

Chilean poet, writer, literary critic and scholar

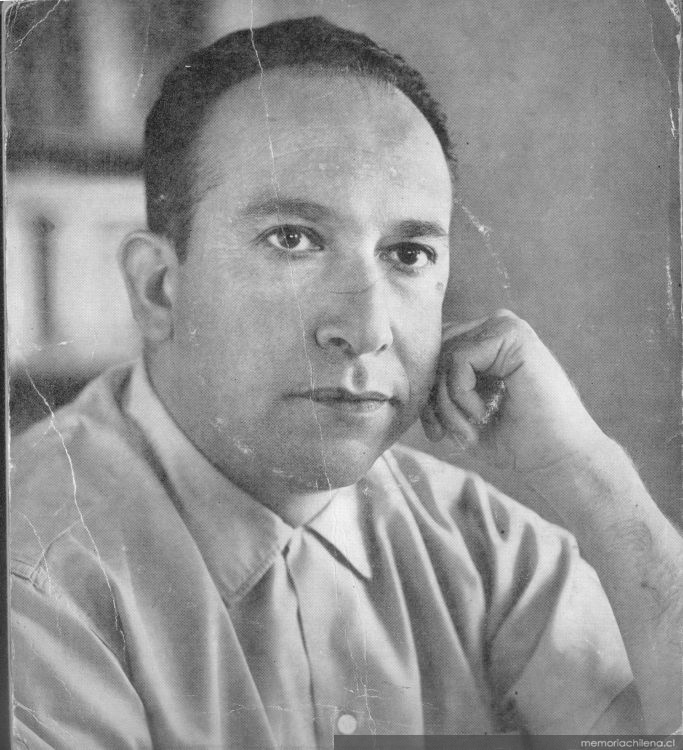
- Fernando Alegría in 1968
- Born: 26 September 1918; Santiago, Chile
- Died: 29 October 2005 (aged 87); Walnut Creek, California
- Occupations: poet, writer, literary critic and scholar

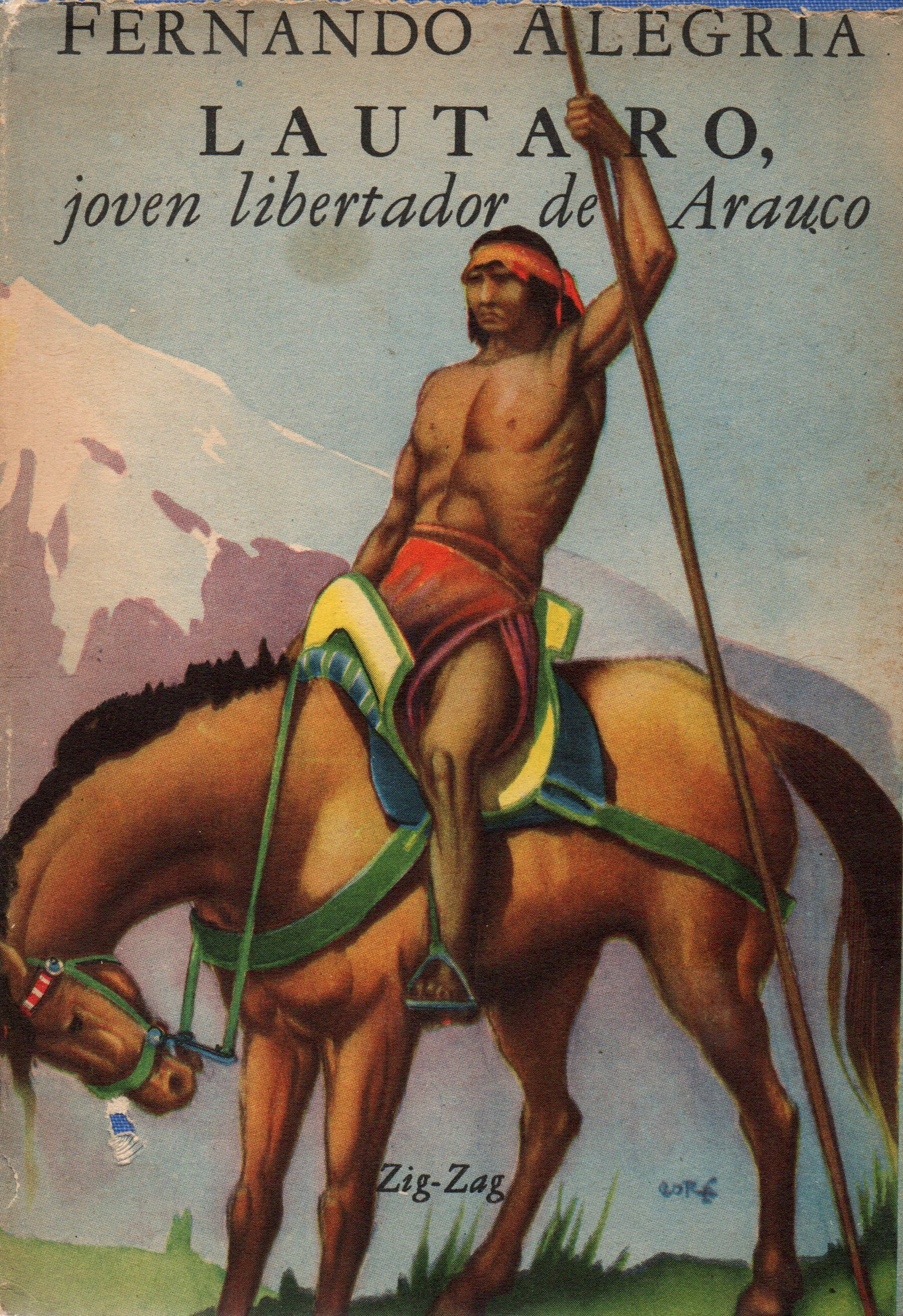

Fernando Alegría (Santiago de Chile, 26 September 1918 – Walnut Creek, California, October 29, 2005) was a Chilean poet, writer, literary critic and scholar.

== Biography ==
He grew up in the Independencia barrio of the city. Poets from this barrio include Pablo Neruda, Violeta Parra and Volodia Teitelboim.

Alegría studied al Instituto Nacional General José Miguel Carrera of Santiago and Universidad de Chile. He received a Master of Arts (M.A.) from Bowling Green State University in 1941 and a Ph.D. from University of California, Berkeley in 1947.

From 1964 to 1967, Alegría was a professor at the University of California, Berkeley. From 1967 to 1998 he was a professor at Stanford University and for many years he was Chair of the Spanish and Portuguese Language Departments there. He sat on the Board of Trustees at the Western Institute for Social Research(WISR) for about twenty years beginning with its inception in 1975.

Alegría served as cultural attaché from the government of Salvador Allende to the United States from 1970 to 1973. He was the representative of the Royal Academy of the Spanish Language in the United States for many years. Among the many awards he received is the Latin American Prize of Literature.

Alegría's "Viva Chile Mierda", the most recited poem of the Allende era, was written in the 1960s.

== Bibliography ==
- Recabarren. Santiago, Chile: Editora Antares, 1938. 162 pp
- Como un árbol rojo. Santiago, Chile: Editora Santiago, 1968. 200 pp
- Lautaro, joven libertador de Arauco. Santiago, Chile: Zig-Zag, 1943. 238 pp.
- La maratón del Palomo. Buenos Aires: Talleres Gráficos Garamond, 1968. 165 pp.; 2a. ed., 1971.
- Camaleón. México, D. F.: Edición y Distribución Iberoamericana de Publicaciones, S.A., 1950. 302 pp.
- Walt Whitman en Hispano America. Mexico City: Ediciones, 1954.
- Caballo de copas. Santiago, Chile: Zig-Zag, 1957. 227 pp. (Biblioteca de novelistas).
- Mañana los guerreros. Santiago, Chile: Zig-Zag, 1964. 274 pp; 2a. ed.1965.
- Amerika, Amerikka, Amerikkka, manifiestos de Vietnam'. Santiago, Chile: Editorial Universitaria, 1970. 190 pp. 2a. ed.,1974.
- El paso de los gansos. Long Island City, N.Y.: Ediciones Puelche, 1975). 215 pp.; 2a. ed., 1980.
- Allende. Mi vecino el Presidente. (novela). Santiago de Chile: Planeta/ Biblioteca del Sur, 1989. 292 pp.
- La rebelión de los placeres. Santiago de Chile: Editorial Andrés Bello, 1990. 171 pp.
- Viva Chile, M... Santiago, Chile: Editorial Universitaria, 1965. 38 pp. 2a. ed., 1966; 3a. ed., 1973.

== Sources ==
- Epple, Juan Armando. Actas de Palo Alto. La obra literaria de Fernando Alegría. Santiago de Chile: Editorial Mosquito, 2000.
- Epple, Juan Armando, ed. Para una fundación imaginaria de Chile. La literatura de Fernando Alegría. Lima: Latinoamericana Editores-Stanford University, 1987.
- Giacoman, Helmy F. ed. Homenaje a Fernando Alegría. Variaciones interpretativas en torno a su obra. New York: Las Americas Publishing Co., 1972.*
- Ruiz, Rene, Fernando Alegría: vida y obra (Madrid: Playor, 1979).

== Research resources ==
- Fernando Alegria Papers, 1924-2000 (59 linear ft.) are housed in the Department of Special Collections and University Archives at Stanford University Libraries
