= Roque Esteban Scarpa =

Chilean writer (1914–1995)

Roque Esteban Scarpa Straboni
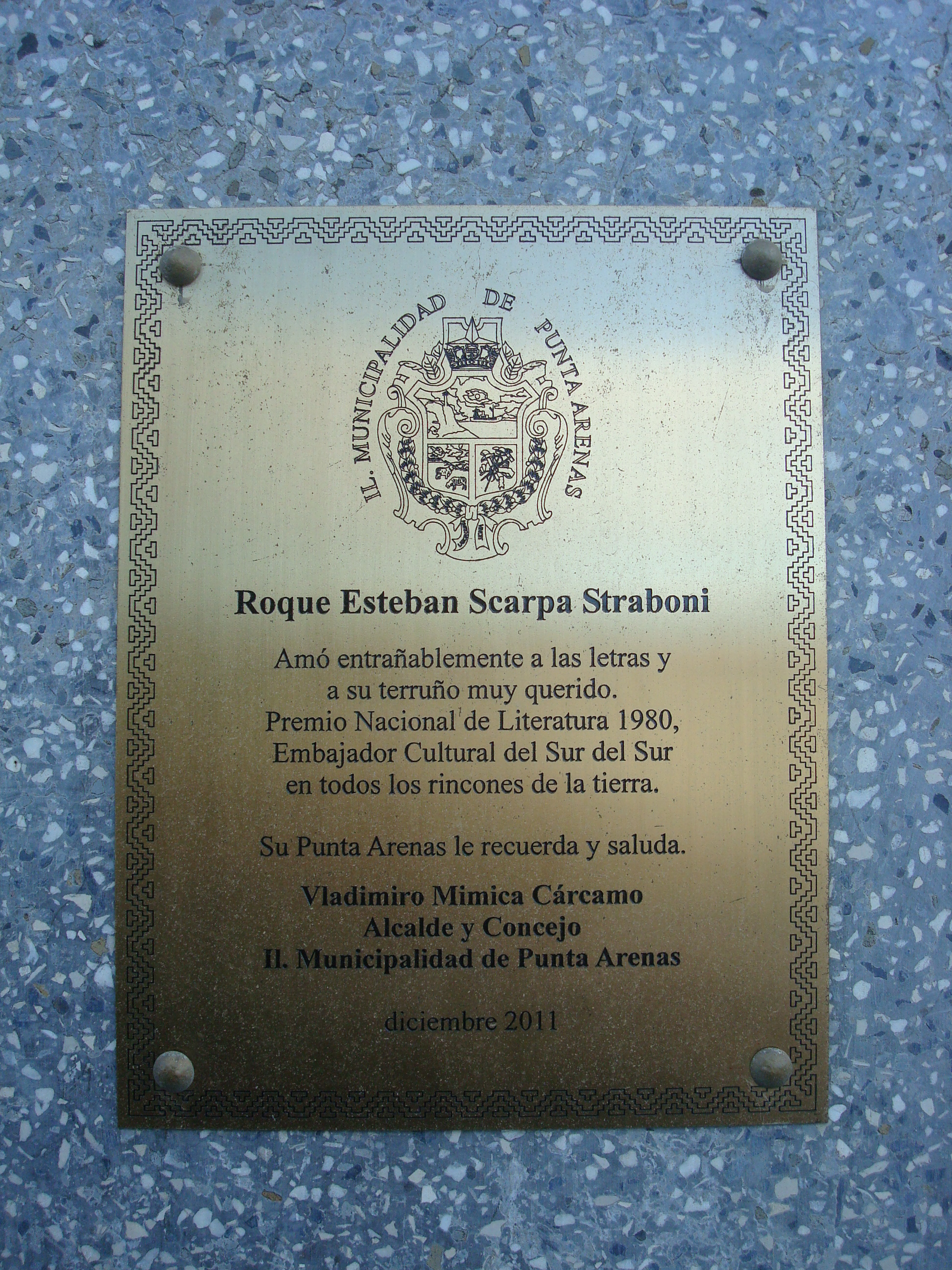
- Born: 26 March 1914; Punta Arenas, Chile
- Died: 11 January 1995 (aged 80); Santiago, Chile
- Occupations: Writer, literary critic, scholar
- Awards: Chilean National Prize for Literature (1980)

Roque Esteban Scarpa Straboni (26 March 1914 – 11 January 1995) was a Chilean writer, literary critic and scholar. He won the Chilean National Prize for Literature in 1980. He was of Croatian and Corsican descent.

Scarpa served as professor of literature at the University of Chile and was a prominent member of the Chilean Academy of Language. In 1943 he founded the Teatro de Ensayo of the Catholic University of Chile. He was director of the National Library of Chile (1967–1971 and 1973–1977).

He also served as a literary critic in the newspapers El Mercurio and La Aurora.

== Works ==
- Dos poetas españoles: Federico García Lorca, Rafael Alberti (1935)
- Mortal mantenimiento (1942)
- Cancionero de Hammud (1942)
- Luz de ayer (poesía 1940-45) (1951)
- Thomas Mann. Una personalidad en una obra (1961)
- Una mujer nada de tonta (1976)
- El árbol deshojado de sonrisas (1977)
- No tengo tiempo: (poesía 1976) (1977)
- La desterrada en su patria: Gabriela Mistral en Magallanes: 1918-1920 (1977)
- El laberinto sin muros (1981)
