= Gonzalo Contreras =

Chilean writer

Gonzalo Contreras is a Chilean writer. In 1991 he won the first edition of El Mercurio's Concurso de Novela Inédita (unpublished novel competition) with La ciudad anterior. He went on to publish El nadador in 1994 and El gran mal in 1998. In 2004 he published Natural Law, and, 9 years later, its second part, Mecanica Celeste. During 20 years he has imparted a literary workshop, bombastically considered the most prestigious in Chile. Literary critic Catholic priest Ignacio Valente described Contreras' prose as very good, as opaque in the best sense, like that of Kafka.
