= Alfredo Jocelyn-Holt =

Chilean writer and historian

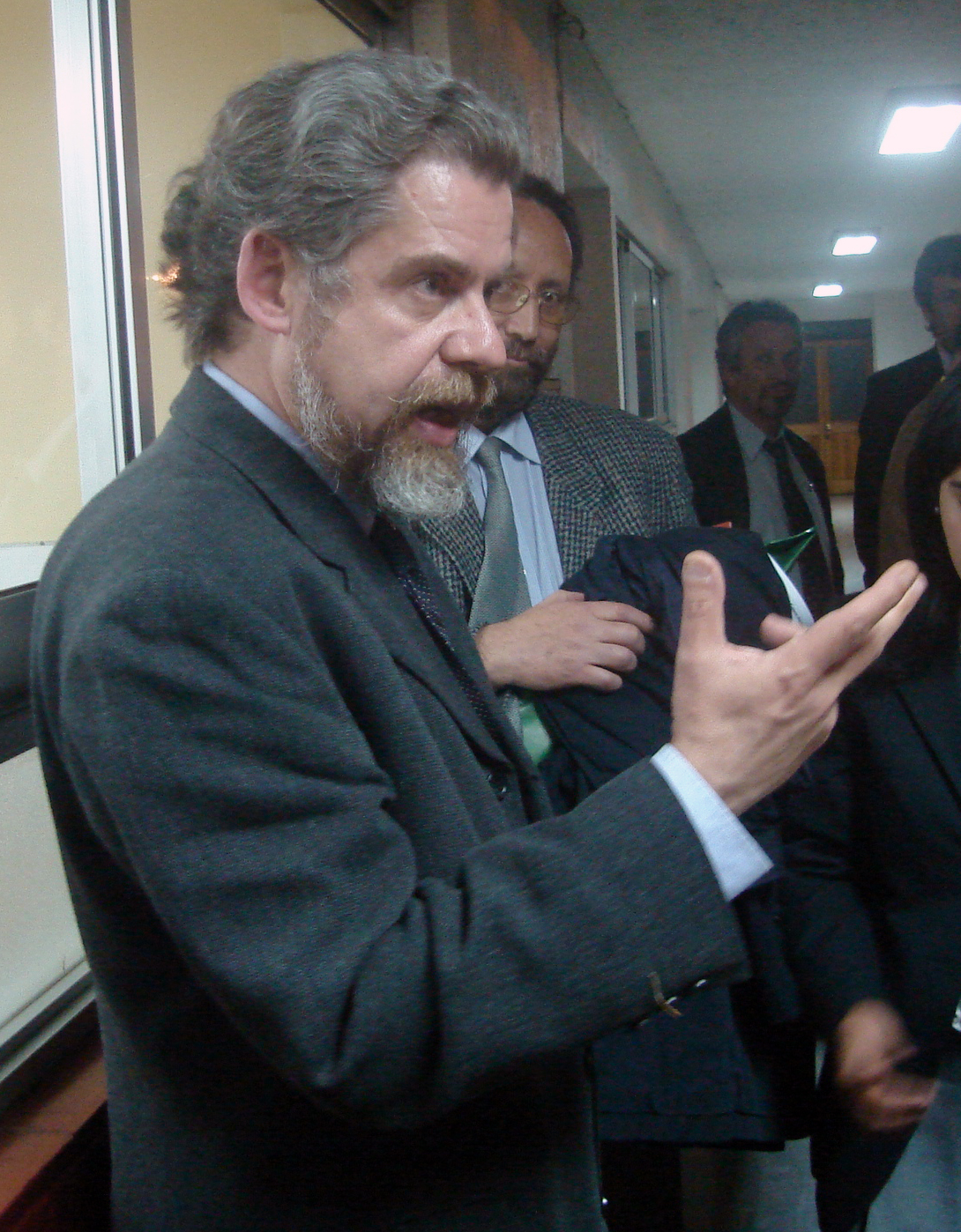
Jocelyn-Holt in 2007

Alfredo Jocelyn-Holt Letelier is a Chilean writer and historian who gained notoriety by his study of the Chilean elite aristocracy and plutocracy and his criticism of traditional state-centered historiography. Jocelyn-Holt has also written several controversial columns, among them one in The Clinic in 2005 where he harshly criticized then presidential candidate Michelle Bachelet.

He has two brothers: Enrique, an economist; and Tomás, lawyer and politician, former member of the Christian Democratic Party of Chile and ex-candidate for the 2013 election of Chile.
