= Roberto Merino (writer) =

Chilean writer and journalist

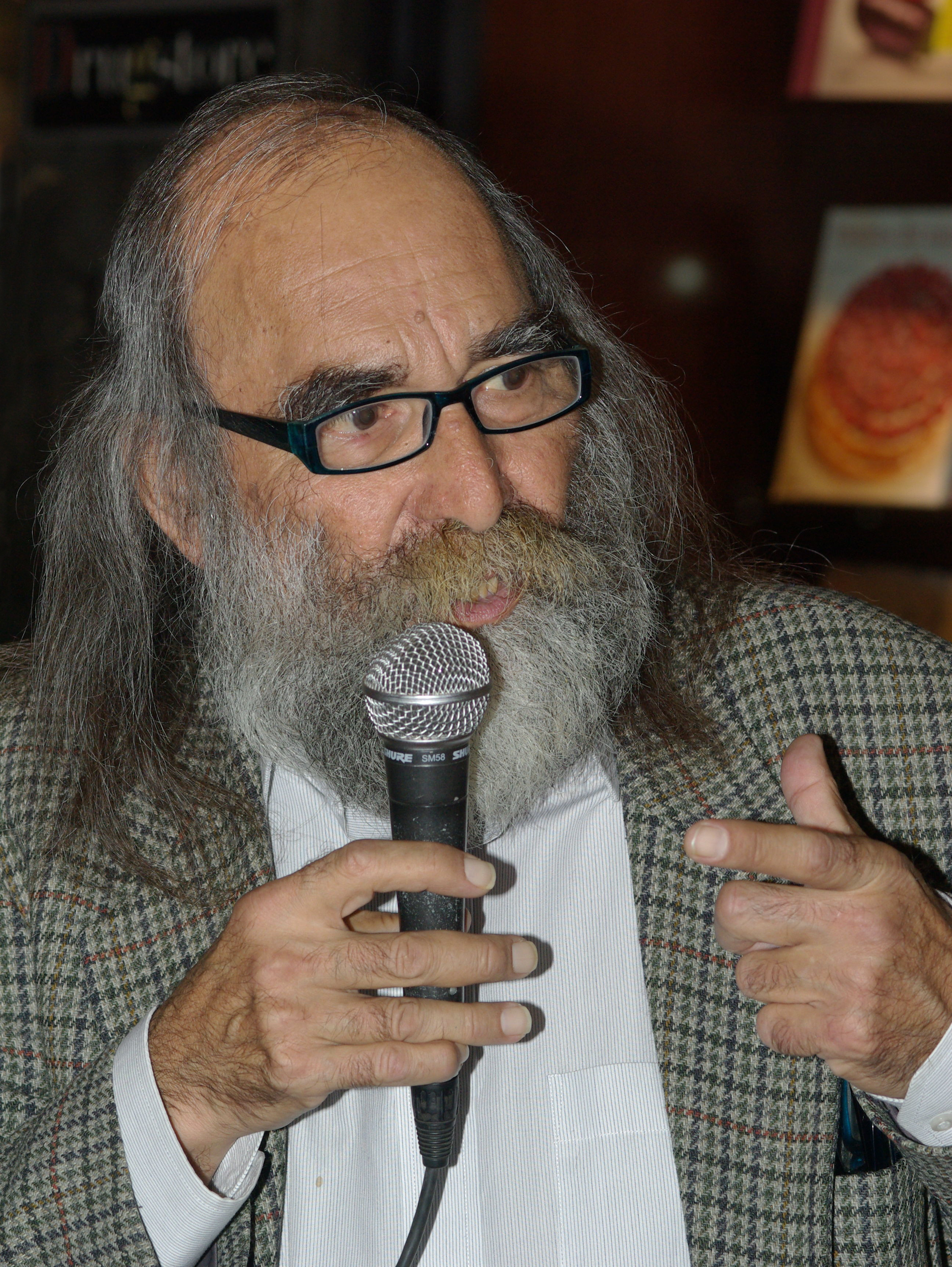
- April 2015
- Born: Roberto Felipe Merino Rojo; 14 November 1961 (age 64); Santiago, Chile
- Education: University of Chile
- Occupations: Writer, editor, journalist, teacher
- Employer: Diego Portales University
- Awards: Santiago Municipal Literature Award (2013)

Roberto Felipe Merino Rojo (born 14 November 1961) is a Chilean writer and journalist.

== Biography ==
Roberto Merino studied at the National Institute and, after completing secondary education, he continued with Literature at the University of Chile, where he graduated with a thesis on the work of poet Juan Luis Martínez.

He has worked at the magazines APSI, Don Balón (where he wrote sports chronicles), Fibra, Paula, and Hoy. He has been the editor of Patagonia, the newspaper El Metropolitano, and chronicler of Las Últimas Noticias and El Mercurio. He founded Ediciones Carlos Porter, which published, among others, Claudio Bertoni. He compiled the Antología del humor literario chileno (2002, Sudamericana), and edited the complete columns and chronicles of Joaquín Edwards Bello. He is a professor of the Faculty of Communication and Literature at Diego Portales University.

Since 2014 he has been part of the rock band Ya Se Fueron, in which he is the oldest member and his son Clemente the youngest. Asked what experience he would choose, more with music than with writing, he answered in March 2015: "If I could, yes, but it is an answer that I give at this time. It is the newest enthusiasm. I would love to. Music has the fascination of the confluence, of the collective. Which is totally opposite to the solitude of writing. One ends relaxed, physically very well. And writing is horrendous. One ends up tense, with his back complete shit. It is totally unnatural from the physical point of view."

The father of two children and separated, Merino lives in the Providencia neighborhood, where he frequents the Tavelli cafe. On his image, he comments: "Sometimes I do not know if this aspect has to do with the late hippieism of the 70s or with a certain nineteenth-century pomposity. I have had a beard since I was sixteen. I do not want to shave anymore; I do not want to know which face I'm going to find underneath."

== Literary career ==
Roberto Merino entered Chilean literature at the end of the 1980s as a poet, but his fame is mainly due to his chronicles.

His decision to become a writer was made as a teenager, "at 16". "It was an explicit decision. I thought that I could only do that and I was already living as a writer; I already thought as a writer. There were not even hesitations, despite family apprehensions about my economic future, which were completely reasonable," Merino confessed in 2014.

His first poem was written at the age of six. "And then at nine, at 11, and at 14".

In 1981, Rodrigo Lira came up with the idea of forming Chamico, and one of its members was Merino, who defined it as "a literary shock group, quite Patagonian and inorganic," "a parody of Surrealist Mandragora." "In the end, it was just a joke that lasted a few months." Merino explains that "the chamico is a toxic weed which makes the cows sick, and also it was likened to marijuana of bad quality." Floating members of the group were Antonio de la Fuente, Perico Cordovez, Alejandro Perez, Juan Pedro Broussein, Lira, and Merino.

The first book published by Merino was Trasmigración, which Enrique Lihn would describe as, "a book of poetry written in anti-prosaic prose." Ten years later his second book of poems, Melancolía artificial, came out, but between these, from the beginning of the 1990s, he was reborn as a chronicler, a genre he practiced for the first time at age 13, in 1974.

That year, for the South American Athletics, he joined the cyclists who followed the marathoners, and when he returned home, "he took a notebook and wrote what he had lived. His first chronicle. Merino would forget the genre" until, 15 years later, Hoy magazine asked him to write about the city. Since then he has been best known as a chronicler, although he does not feel like such, and a "specialist in Santiago, less," even though he has published several books on the Chilean capital with more than 160 chronicles.

"I have no talent or patience for that," says Merino, explaining why he does not write fiction. As for poetry, he confessed in December 2013: "I have not written poetry in a long time. I have not felt the need. I have not had the chance. I lead an accelerated life that increasingly leaves me less distance to look at the world."

== Works ==
=== Poetry ===
- Trasmigración, Ediciones Archivo, 1987
- Melancolía artificial, Ediciones Carlos Porter, 1997 (Ediciones UDP, 2011)

=== Chronicles and essays ===
- Chilenos universales, Planeta/La Máquina del Arte, 1995
- Santiago de memoria, Planeta 1997
- Horas perdidas en las calles de Santiago, Editorial Sudamericana, 2000
- Luces de reconocimiento, essays about Chilean writers; Ediciones UDP, 2008. Selected and edited by Andrés Braithwaite.
- Todo Santiago. Crónicas de la ciudad, Hueders, 2012. Selected and edited by Andrés Braithwaite.
- En busca del loro atrofiado, JC Sáez Editor, Santiago, 2005. Selected and edited by Andrés Braithwaite. (reissued in 2012 by the Argentine imprint Mansalva and the Chilean Calabaza del Diablo)
- Barrio República. Una crónica, Ediciones UDP, 2013
- Pista resbaladiza, Ediciones UDP, 2014. Selected and edited by Andrés Braithwaite.
- Padres e hijos, a compilation of selected texts and edited by Andrés Braithwaite; links to childhood, published in the newspaper Las Últimas Noticias between 2002 and 2014; Hueders, 2015
- Lihn. Ensayos biográficos, Ediciones UDP, Santiago 2016

== Awards and recognitions ==
- 2006 Academia Chilena de la Lengua Award for En busca del loro atrofiado
- Selected by the Argentine newspaper Clarín among the best books of 2012 with En busca del loro atrofiado (reissued in Buenos Aires by the imprint Mansalva)
- 2013 Santiago Municipal Literature Award for Todo Santiago. Crónicas de la ciudad
- Finalist for the 2017 Santiago Municipal Literature Award with Lihn. Ensayos biográficos
