= Alfonso Calderón (poet) =

Chilean poet and writer (1930–2009)

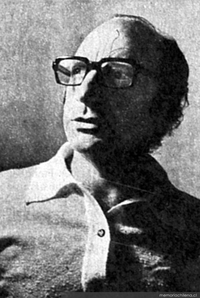
- Born: November 21, 1930; San Fernando, Chile
- Died: August 8, 2009 (aged 78); Santiago de Chile
- Occupations: Poet and writer

Alfonso Calderón Squadritto (November 21, 1930 – August 8, 2009) was a Chilean poet and writer. He won the Chilean National Prize for Literature in 1998. He had been a member of the Academia Chilena de la Lengua (Chilean Academy of Language) since 1981. He died on August 8, 2009, having suffered a heart attack.

== Biography ==
His secondary school years were spent in the Liceos of Los Ángeles, Temuco and in the Internado Nacional Barros Arana in Santiago, and completed his qualification in the Instituto Pedagógico de la Universidad de Chile in 1952.

After a stint as a Spanish teacher in the Liceo de Hombres de La Serena from 1952 to 1964, he returned to Santiago to teach in the Institute of Chilean Literature of the University of Chile. He also taught in the University's School of Journalism, was head of the School of Journalism of the Pontifical Catholic University of Chile, professor of writing skills in the Universidad Andrés Bello, professor of Literature in the Diplomatic Academy of the same name, and also taught in the University of Chile and the Miguel de Cervantes University.

His literary debut came in 1949 with a collection of poems, Primer consejo a los arcángeles del viento, and by 1952 he had become a critic in journals and newspapers. In 1953 he became the president of the newly founded Carlos Mondaca Cortés Literary Circle, and his reviews appeared in the La Serena publications El Serenense and El Día. He participated in the Revista Ercilla, was head of the Revista Mapocho and played a role in the Editora Nacional Quimantu set up by Salvador Allende's Unidad Popular government from 1971 until the 1973 coup.

In 1974, under Augusto Pinochet's dictatorship, he gave up his teaching positions in protest at military intervention in Chile's higher education institutions.

From 1981 he was a member of the Academia Chilena de la Lengua, (Note: The body responsible for overseeing the Spanish language in Chile.) and was appointed to the post of director of the Diego Barros Arana Research Centre of the Chilean National Library in 1993.

His daughters Teresa and Lila Calderón are poets, and Cecilia Calderón González is a professor of Language and Communication and author of several textbooks.

He died on August 8, 2009, of a heart attack, and was cremated in accordance with his final wishes.
