= Juvencio Valle =

Chilean poet (1900–1999)

Juvencio Valle

Juvencio Valle, is the pseudonym of Gilberto Concha Riffo (November 6, 1900 – February 12, 1999), was a noted Chilean poet. He is a recipient of the Premio Nacional de Literatura de Chile, a National Prize awarded to poets of high reputation.

== Biography ==
Valle was born in Villa Almagro, Nueva Imperial in 1900. He studied at a primary school in his native town but at the age of 11, his family moved to Temuco where he studied at a grammar school, which was also attended by his near-contemporary Pablo Neruda. In 1918, he traveled for the first time to the Chilean capital of Santiago, where he remained for two years; and he began to develop an ability for writing poetry. In 1933, he settled in Santiago, which marked the beginning of a bohemian stage in his life, which was reflected in his writings. In 1938, he traveled to Spain, and became active in Ercilla magazine. He was arrested by the Francoist forces as a supporter of the Republic, and repatriated to Chile. In 1941 he won a contest organized by the Municipality of Santiago, with his book Nimbo de piedra, dedicated to the four hundred years of the city.

Valle later traveled to Romania, the Soviet Union, and other countries of eastern Europe and to Cuba. In 1966, he received the National Prize of Literature (Premio Nacional de Literatura de Chile).

He died on February 12, 1999, aged 98.

== Works ==
- La flauta del hombre pan. 1929.
- El tratado del bosque. 1932.
- Nimbo de piedra. 1941.
- El hijo del guardabosque. 1951.
- Del monte en la ladera. 1960.
