= Miguel Arteche =

Chilean poet and novelist

Miguel Salinas Arteche
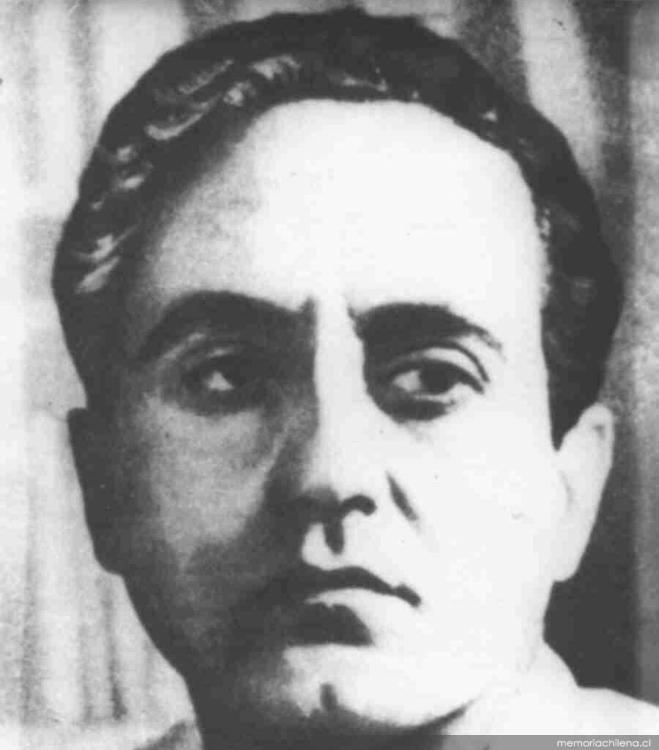
- Born: 4 June 1926 Nueva Imperial, Cautín Province, Chile
- Died: 22 July 2012 (aged 86) Santiago, Santiago Province, Chile, Chile

Miguel Salinas Arteche (4 June 1926 – 22 July 2012), best known as Miguel Arteche, the name he adopted after legally reversing his maternal and paternal surnames in 1972, was a Chilean poet and novelist. He was born in Nueva Imperial, Cautín, 9th Region, on June 4, 1926, but spent most of his adult life in Santiago, Chile working as an academic. He was also awarded government positions, both in Chile and abroad. His writings appeared first in the Anthology of the Generation of 1950, compiled by Enrique Lafourcade, a well-known Chilean writer.

== Biography ==
He studied Law in the Universidad de Chile, but shortly dropped to study Literature at the Universidad de Madrid, Spain from 1951 to 1944. His work ranges from poetry to novels and short stories.

In 1947 he published his first book, Invitación al olvido. After publishing a number of poetry books, he published Cantata del desterrado in 1951 before departing to Europe. The experience of living in Spain was fundamental to his writing, approaching him to his family roots and the intellectual world of Europe. After some years he returned to Chile, where he continued his literary career. In 1976 he published one of his most celebrated books, Destierros y tinieblas.

In 1956, Chilean president Eduardo Frei Montalva nominated him to the Chilean Embassy in Madrid, where he remained until 1970, later being added to the Chilean Embassy in Honduras, where he worked until 1971, staying for an additional period as a Visiting Professor. After returning to Chile, he opposed the military government of Augusto Pinochet, which led to the marginalization of his work, which would prevent him from publishing in Chile until the return of democracy.

In 1996 he was awarded the Premio Nacional de Literatura, the greatest literary award in Chile.

== Literary generation of 1950 ==
Miguel Arteche is one of the authors of the so-called Generación literaria de 1950. Writers in this category were born between 1920 and 1934. This classification was proposed by author Enrique Lafourcade in 1954. Prominent writers of this generation were Miguel Arteche, Enrique Lafourcade, Pablo Neruda, Vicente Huidobro, Humberto Díaz Casanueva, Rosamel del Valle, Jorge Edwards, Claudio Giaconi, et al. These writers were influenced by authors such as Walt Whitman, William Faulkner and Ernest Hemingway. Miguel Arteche also stated the Spanish Siglo de oro as one of his main influences. He taught his students the traditional art of metrical writing against the use of free verse.

== Works ==
El agua (the water), from Destierros y Tinieblas (Exiles and Darkness), 1963, is one of his most renowned poems; he had it in display hand-carved in wood at the entrance of his studio. Translated by Walter Hilliger, one of his students from the 90s:

EL AGUA	THE WATER
A media noche desperté. Toda la casa navegaba. Era la lluvia con la lluvia de la postrera madrugada. Toda la casa era silencio, y eran silencio las montañas de aquella noche. No se oía sino caer el agua. Me vi despierto a medianoche buscando a tientas la ventana; pero en la casa y sobre el mundo no había hermanos, madre, nada. Y hacia el espacio oscuro y frío y frío el barco caminaba conmigo. ¿Quién movía todas las velas solitarias? Nadie me dijo que saliera. Nadie me dijo que me entrara, y adentro, adentro de mí mismo me retiré: toda la casa. Me vio en el tiempo que yo fui, y en el seré la vi lejana, y ya no pude reclinar mi juventud sobre la almohada. A medianoche busqué mientras la casa navegaba. Y sobre el mundo no se oyó sino caer el agua.	I woke up at midnight the whole house set sail. In the early morning, there was rain with rain. The house was in silence, the mountains restrained, that night, one could hear but the falling rain. I saw me that night searching vents in vain; at home, and the world, no brothers, mum, friends. The space was dark, cold, and cold the ship stayed with me. Who moved all lonely candle flames? No one told me, go, No one told me, stay, inside, within me, Home, I left away. She saw who I was, she seemed far someday. I couldn't lean back on the pillow's surface. That midnight I searched while the house sailed straight. Above the world hearing but the fall of rain.

=== Poetry ===
- La invitación al olvido, 1947
- Oda fúnebre, 1948
- Una nube, 1949
- El sur dormido, 1950
- Cantata del desterrado, 1951
- Solitario, mira hacia la ausencia, 1953
- Otro continente, 1957
- Quince poemas, 1961
- Destierros y tinieblas, 1963
- De la ausencia a la noche, 1965
- Resta poética, 1966
- Para un tiempo tan breve, 1970
- Antología de veinte años, 1972
- Noches, 1976
- Cantata del Pan y la Sangre, 1980, 1981, 1986
- Variaciones alemanas, 1986
- Variaciones sobre versos de Karol Wojtyla, 1987
- Monólogo en la Torre, 1989
- Siete canciones, 1989
- Tercera antología, 1991
- Fénix de madrugada, 1975–1992
- Poemas para nietos, 1996
- Para un tiempo tan breve, 1997
- Jardín de relojes, 2002

=== Novel ===
- La otra orilla, 1964
- El Cristo hueco, 1969
- La disparatada vida de Félix Palissa, 1975
- El alfil negro, 1992 (unpublished)

=== Short Story ===
- Mapas del otro mundo, 1977
- Las naranjas del silencio, 1987

=== Autobiography ===
- Los ángeles de la provincia, 1975

=== Essay ===
- Notas para la vieja y la nueva poesía chilena, 1958
- La extrañeza de ser americano, 1962
- Discurso de incorporación a la Academia Chilena de la Lengua, 1965
- El extraño caso de Gabriela Mistral, 1968
- Tres visiones de Carlos Droguett. 1971
- Alfonso Calderón o cuarenta años después, 1978
- Llaves para la poesía, 1984
- Algunos de mis fantasmas, 1985
- Algo acerca de la experiencia poética, 1988
- La crítica poética y el crítico único, 1988
- Exposición sobre un taller de poesía, 1988
- La fuente dividida de Gabriela Mistral, 1989
- El nombre perdido y buscado en América, 1989
- Cómo leer un poema, 1989
- Gabriela Mistral: seis o siete materias alucinadas, 1989
- Escribir como niño para niños, 1990
- De modo inseguro y problemático, 1990
- Los coléricos hijos de Damaso Alonso, 1990
- Algunos aprendices de brujo, 1989
- Palabras en Alberti, 1991.
