= Enrique Bunster =

Chilean novelist and playwright

- Born: July 2, 1912; Santiago, Chile
- Died: November 25, 1976 (aged 64); Santiago, Chile
- Occupations: Novelist, playwright

Enrique Bunster (July 2, 1912 – November 25, 1976) was a Chilean novelist and playwright. He won the Municipal Prize of Literature of Santiago for Isla de la bucaneros in 1946.

== Works ==
- La primera noche galante, 1933
- Teatro verosímil, 1933
- Nadie puede saberlo, 1934
- Casa de locos, 1937
- Un velero sale del puerto, 1937
- El hombre y sus recuerdos, 1938
- Después de sus días, 1938
- El tren de carga, 1938
- Isla de los Bucaneros, 1940
- Lord Cochrane, 1943
- La isla de los Bucaneros, 1948
- Bombardeo de Valparaíso, 1948
- Corresponsal de la Antártica, 1948
- Motín en Punta Arenas, 1950
- Mar del Sur, 1951
- Teatro Breve, 1953
- Chilenos en California, 1954
- La Orana Tahití, 1956
- Para reír y rabiar, 1958
- Un ángel para Chile, 1959
- Aroma de Polinesia, 1959
- Cuentos Selectos, 1973
- Oro y Sangre, 1974
- Distinguidas historias, 1976
- Crónicas Portalianas, 1977
- Crónica del Pacífico, 1977
- Operación Vela
- Recuerdos y Pájaros, 1968
- Tiempo Atrás
- Casa de Antigüedades
- Bala en Boca
- Crónicas Azul y Verde, 1995
- Vía Cabo de Hornos, 1998
