= Luis Alberto Acuña Gatillon =

Chilean writer (1927–2005)

Luis Alberto Acuña Gatillon (1927 in Iquique – 2005) was a Chilean writer and storyteller par excellence born in Iquique. He was Professor of applied chemistry, and taught at the former State Technical University for 26 years until his exoneration for political reasons.

== Works ==
Books

- La Revancha (The revenge). Stories. Santiago, 1960.
- Contrabando (Contraband). Stories. Santiago, 1962.
- La Noche Larga (The Long Night). Stories. Santiago, 1967.
- Jarrón de Porcelana China (Chinese Porcelain Vase). Stories. Santiago, 1979.
- Carmelo se fue a la Guerra (Carmelo went to war). Stories. Santiago, 1995.
- Hable y Escriba Mejor (Speak and write better). Original Compendium of grammar. Santiago, 2000.
- Píldoras para el Estrés (Pills for stress). Maxims and epigrams. Santiago, 2001.

Unpublished works

- ¿Dónde está tu hermano? (Where is your brother). Radio drama.
- Escultor del Tiempo (Sculptor of time). Poems.

Inclusion in anthologies

- Cuentos humorísticos de autores chilenos (Humorous tales from Chilean authors). Javier Rodríguez Lefebre. Santiago, 1965
- Encuentro (Encounter). Santiago, 1984.
- Antología del cuento chileno (Anthology of Chilean short story). Enrique Lafourcade. Santiago, 1985.
- ¡Y Por qué no! (And why not!). National NO Campaign. Santiago, 1988.
- I racconti piu brevi del Cile (More short stories of Chile). Gianni Toti. Roma, 1997.

In film

- El Leyton, Chilean film by Gonzalo Justiniano, based on the story La Red from the book La Noche Larga.

== Prizes and awards ==
Winner of various literary prizes including the following:

=== Major Chilean awards ===
- Premio Municipal de Cuento (Municipal Prize for Story), 1980.
- Gabriela Mistral Poetic Festival Prize, 1974.
- Alerce Award, Society of Chilean Writers, 1978.
- Daniel de la Vega Prize, Las Últimas Noticias newspaper, 1993.

=== International award ===
- Honorable Mention -2nd prize for unpublished short-story, Ibero-American story-writing contest, Association of Critics and Commentators of Arts. Miami, U.S.A., 1976.

== Bibliography and External links ==
- Escritores.cl
- Diccionario de Literatura Chilena (Dictionary of Chilean Literature), Efraín Szmulevic, 1st Edition, 1978; 2nd Edition,1984; 3rd Edition, 1998.
- Chilean Writers Society
- TVN.cl
- Jarrón de Porcelana China
- Camina por Atacama
- El Caupe
- La Costra
- La Red
