= Jorge Teillier =

Chilean poet (1935-1996)

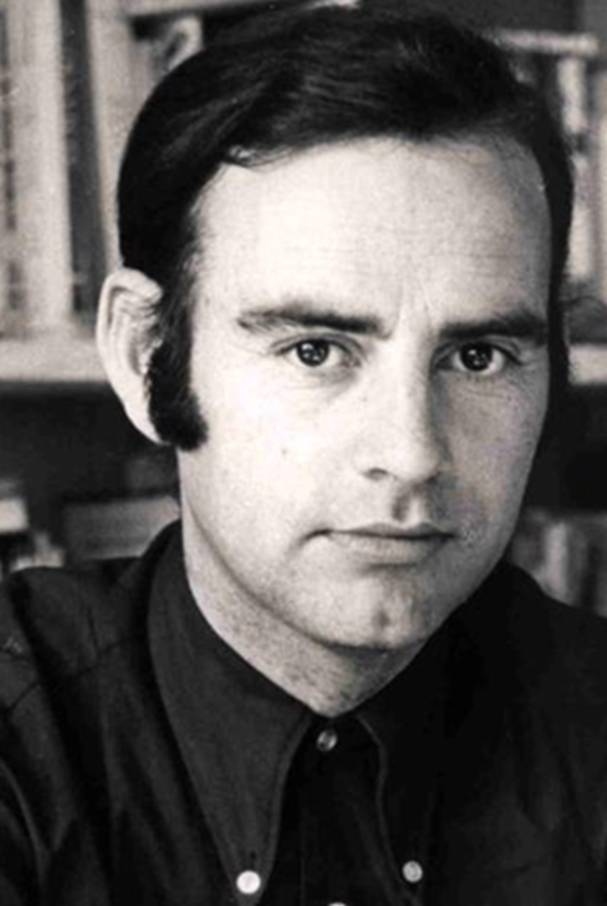
- Teillier in 1965
- Born: June 24, 1935; Lautaro, Chile
- Died: April 22, 1996 (aged 60); Viña del Mar, Chile
- Writing career
- Language: Spanish
- Period: 1919–1962
- Genre: Poetry
- Notable works: Para ángeles y gorriones; El cielo cae con las hojas; El árbol de la memoria; Los trenes de la noche y otros poemas; Poemas del País de Nunca Jamás; Poemas secretos; Crónica del forastero

Jorge Octavio Teillier Sandoval (24 June 1935 – 22 April 1996) was a Chilean poet. He was born in Lautaro, Chile and died in Viña del Mar.

At the age of 12, he began writing, inspired by adventure books by authors such as Panait Istrati, Knut Hamsun, and Jules Verne, as well as fairy tales. Later, he was influenced by poets of Hispanic-American modernism, the creationist Vicente Huidobro, and universal poets such as Jorge Manrique, Rainer Maria Rilke, and François Villon. He is also associated with Friedrich Hölderlin and Georg Trakl.

For Teillier, the importance of poetry lies not in aesthetics but in the creation of myth and a space or time that transcends the ordinary while utilizing it. According to Teillier, the poet must not signify but simply be.

He proposed a time of rootedness in contrast to the generation of the 1950s, which favored migration to cities.

== Laric Poetry ==
In 1965, "driven by the impulse to shape his mythical space, he published Los poetas de los lares, an essay that reviews the work of a group of poets who focused their work on the province, childhood, and respect for traditions, inaugurating an important branch of national poetry: Laric Poetry.

Laric poetry, or poetry of the lares—referring to origins or the frontier—represents the ethics and aesthetics founded by Jorge Teillier and conveyed throughout his work. This approach to poetry is characterized by a return to the past, to a lost paradise where the everyday and the pleasant contrast with the prevailing modernity of the time. Teillier emphasizes the search for the values of the landscape, the village, and the province, blending nostalgic images of lost childhood and the primal nature of the myth. Through typically simple writing, he proposed a return to a Golden Age where the lyrical speaker and the reader could access a purer and happier world, "a better world," as the poet himself described it.

== Work ==
=== Poetry Collections ===
Para ángeles y gorriones, Ediciones Puelche, Santiago, 1956 (downloadable from Memoria Chilena; reissued: 1995)

El cielo cae con las hojas, Ediciones Alerce, Santiago, 1958

El árbol de la memoria, Arancibia Hermanos, Santiago, 1961

Los trenes de la noche y otros poemas, Revista Mapocho, 1961 (downloadable from Memoria Chilena)

Poemas del País de Nunca Jamás, colección El Viento en la Llama, directed by Armando Menedín, 1963

Poemas secretos, Ediciones de los Anales de la Universidad de Chile, separata, 1965 (downloadable from Memoria Chilena)

Crónica del forastero, printed by Arancibia Hermanos, Santiago, 1968

Muertes y maravillas, anthology, Editorial Universitaria, 1971 (reissued: 2005 and in 2011 by Ediciones Universidad Diego Portales)

Para un pueblo fantasma, Ediciones Universitarias de Valparaíso, 1978 (reissued: 2005)

La isla del tesoro; an epistolary poetry collection co-written with Peruvian poet Juan Cristóbal, Lima, 1982 (expanded reissue: Editorial Dolmen, 1996; third definitive edition, Descontexto Editores, 2013)

Cartas para reinas de otras primaveras, Ediciones Manieristas, Santiago, 1985

El molino y la higuera, Ediciones del Azafrán, Santiago, 1993

Hotel Nube, Ediciones LAR, Concepción, 1996

En el mudo corazón del bosque, Editorial Fondo de Cultura Económica, 1997
