= LOM Ediciones =

LOM Ediciones («Lom», means in yaghan language: «sun») is a Chilean press based in Santiago. It was established in 1990. Several Chileans and Latin American writers published in this press, like Pedro Lemebel, Tomas Moulian and Enrique Lihn.
