= Elvira Hernández =

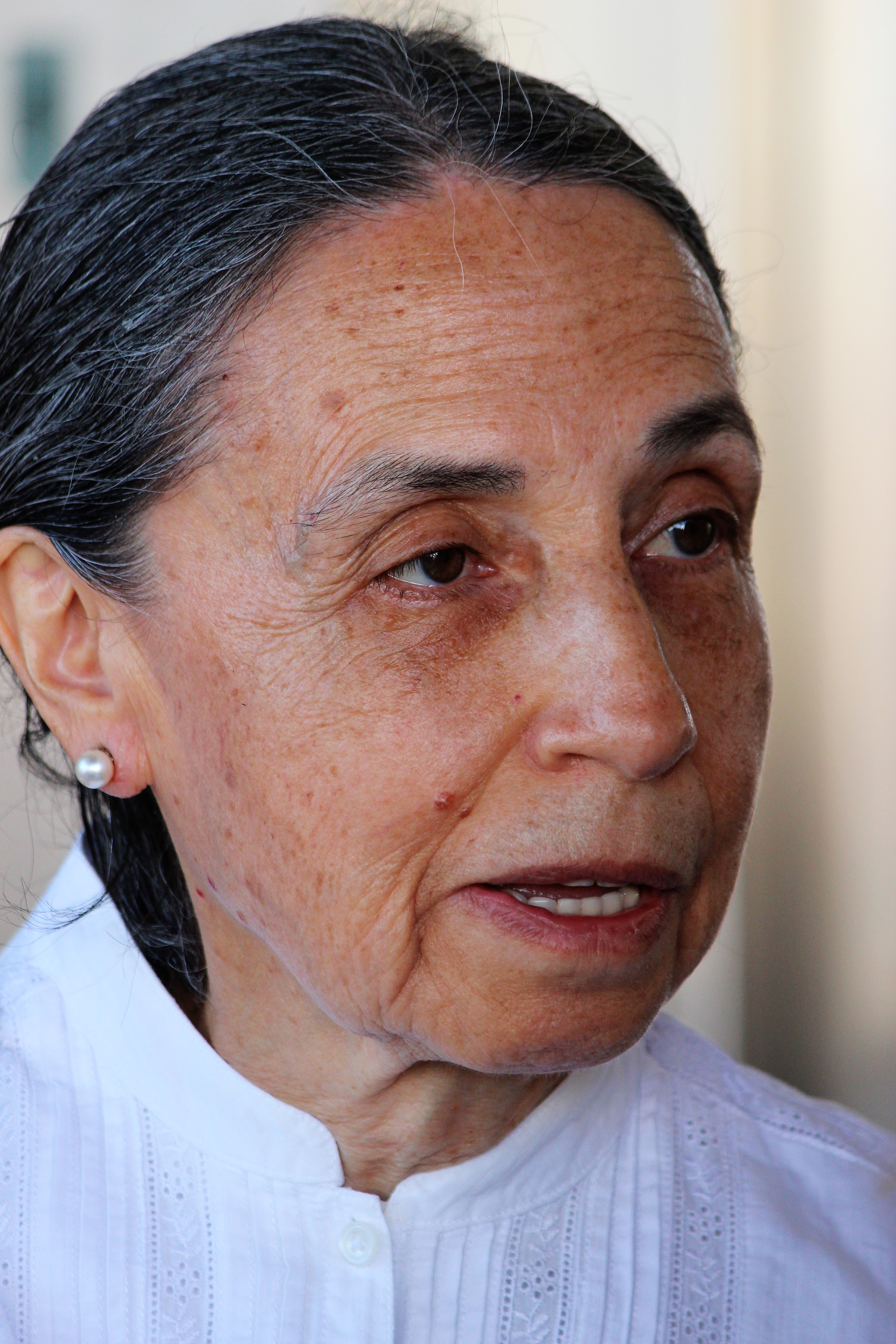
- Hernández in 2018
- Born: Rosa María Teresa Adriasola Olave; 2 July 1951 (age 75); Lebu, Chile
- Education: Pedagogical Institute of the University of Chile
- Occupations: Poet, essayist, literary critic
- Awards: Pablo Neruda Ibero-American Poetry Award (2018)

Elvira Hernández (pseudonym of Rosa María Teresa Adriasola Olave; born 2 July 1951) is a Chilean poet, essayist, and literary critic.

== Biography ==
Rosa María Teresa Adriasola Olave was born in Lebu on 2 July 1951. She began writing poetry at an early age. Her basic education took place in Chillán. She later undertook secondary studies at the Instituto Santa María, a school for nuns. In 1969, she majored in philosophy at the Pedagogical Institute of the University of Chile, where she remained for four years. After the 1973 coup d'état by General Augusto Pinochet against the Popular Unity government, in 1975, she studied literature at the Department of Humanistic Studies of the Faculty of Physical Sciences and Mathematics, then directed by Cristián Huneeus, with teachers such as Jorge Guzmán, Ronald Kay, Enrique Lihn, and Nicanor Parra.

In 1979, she was arrested on the street by agents of the National Information Center (CNI), and was held in the Borgoño Barracks for five days (they had mistaken her for another person they called the submachine gun woman). To date, she has not produced any testimony about this fact, explaining in a 2016 interview, "It is something that I cannot do yet, because you have to have the right perspective." The following year, she began to write La bandera de Chile while "under a lot of pressure".

They followed me every day. They called me on the phone. I continued to attend classes and, as República was a military neighborhood, sometimes a jeep passed by and I felt like they were coming for me again. Then I could no longer pay attention. I would sit on the edge of the window to feel like I was watching over everything. If I was going to continue writing, I had to give an account of all that, but not as a testimony, because my personal experience, analyzed in its context, was somewhat minimal compared to what happened to hundreds of people.

— Elvira Hernández, from interview with Pedro Pablo Guerrero, El Mercurio, Revista de Libros

The book, a diary of poetic reflections on Chile and its emblems, would not be formally published for 10 years. It circulated clandestinely in the form of mimeographed copies during the military dictatorship, and those poems became symbolic of the resistance.

In 1986, ¡Arre! Halley Arre! was released, and since then Elvira Hernández has continued to publish both poetry books and essays (the latter signed with her real name, Teresa Adriasola).

Her work has been associated with "neo-avant-garde" poets such as Raúl Zurita, Soledad Fariña, Verónica Zondek and Juan Luis Martínez. However, the author has another opinion:

I have never felt neo-avant-garde. At that time I was living through a formative period in which I felt that everything I had advanced as a secret author was worth nothing. So, it could hardly have been an avant-garde or a neo-avant-garde attitude, because I was in the process of learning about Chilean poetry, which was what interested me, and then continued with that of Latin America.

She has written essays jointly with Soledad Fariña and Verónica Zondek.

== Awards ==
- Finalist for the 2012 Altazor Award for Cuaderno de deportes
- Career award at the 2017 La Chascona Poetry Festival
- 2018 Jorge Teillier National Poetry Award
- 2018 Pablo Neruda Ibero-American Poetry Award
- 2018 Circle of Art Critics' Award, Poetry category for the book Pájaros desde mi ventana
- 2024 National Prize for Literature (Chile)

== Works ==
- La bandera de Chile, finished writing in 1981; mimeographs circulated clandestinely in Chile and published 10 years later, with presentation by Federico Schopf: Libros de Tierra Firme, Buenos Aires, 1991; Cuneta, Santiago, 2010
- ¡Arre! Halley ¡Arre!, Ergo Sum, Santiago, 1986
- Meditaciones físicas por un hombre que se fue, Arte postal, Santiago, 1987
- Carta de viaje, Ediciones Último Reino, Buenos Aires, 1989
- El orden de los días, Roldanillo, Colombia, 1991
- Santiago Waria, Cuarto Propio, Santiago, 1992
- Merodeos en torno a la obra poética de Juan Luis Martínez, together with Soledad Fariña; Intemperie, Santiago, 2001
- Álbum de Valparaíso, LOM Ediciones, Santiago, 2002
- Cuaderno de deportes, Cuarto Propio, Santiago, 2010
- Actas urbe, with prologue by Guido Arroyo, Alquimia Ediciones, Santiago, 2013
- Los trabajos y los días, anthology; selection, edition, and notes by Vicente Undurraga, Editorial Lumen, Santiago, 2016
- Pájaros desde mi ventana, Alquimia Ediciones, Santiago, 2018
