= José Baroja =

Chilean author (born 1983)

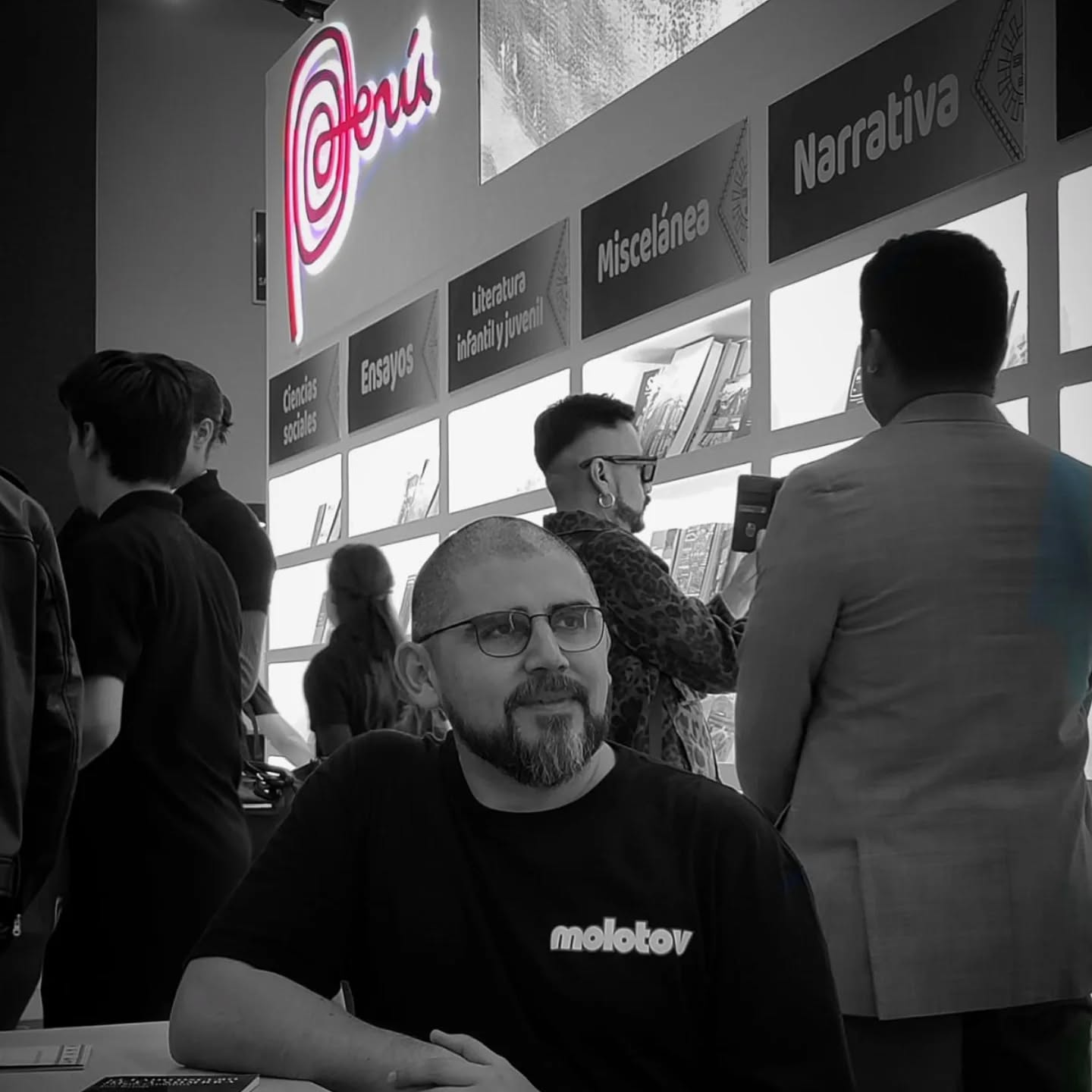
- José Baroja in 2025
- Born: Ramón Mauricio González Gutiérrez; September 4, 1983 (age 43); Valdivia, Chile
- Education: Master's in Literature
- Alma mater: Pontificia Universidad Católica de Chile
- Occupations: Writer, academic and editor
- Spouse: Leyda Sinaí Mariscal Arcinierga
- Writing career
- Pen name: José Baroja
- Language: Spanish
- Genres: Short story, poetry
- Notable works: El hombre del terrón de azúcar; Un hijo de perra; El lado oscuro de la sombra; Sueño en Guadalajara
- Notable awards: Ensayo a Francisco de Miranda; Concurso Literario Gonzalo Rojas Pizarro; Tierras Poéticas; Exilio
- Movements: Neofantastic and Social Realism
- Website: josebaroja.com

Ramón Mauricio González Gutiérrez (born September 4, 1983), known by his pen name José Baroja, is a Chilean writer, academic and editor. He is regarded as a representative of the Neofantastic and social realist short stories traditions within the new Chilean narrative and is also recognized as part of contemporary Jaliscan literature.

== Biography ==
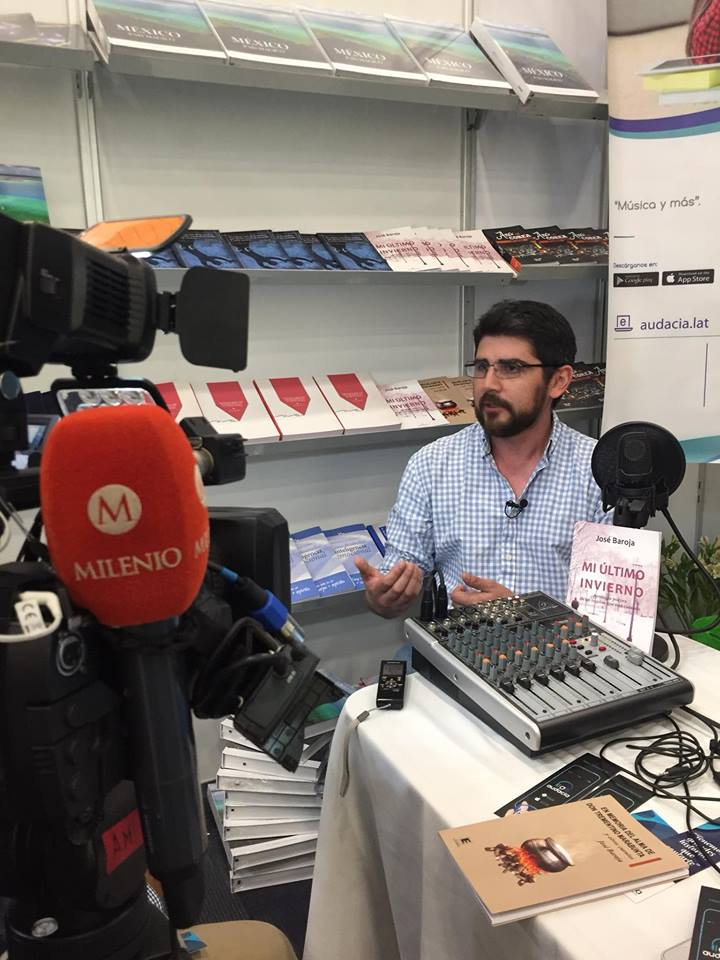
Interview at Guadalajara International Book Fair

As the eldest of three sons of Ramón González and Marta Gutiérrez, he was born in the Regional Hospital of Valdivia, Chile, in 1983. But he lives his adolescence in the city of Maipú in Santiago de Chile. There, he studied at Colegio Internacional Alba and at Oxford College.

He graduated from the Pontifical Catholic University of Chile with a bachelor's degree in Letters, with a mention in Linguistics and Hispanic Literature, and a master's degree in Letters and a mention in Literature.

Between 2007 and 2017, he began to give lectures and workshops on both subjects in several universities and institutes in Chile, mainly in Santiago, Talca and Valdivia. Besides this, he participates in seminars and congresses in the area, among which Primer Encuentro Nacional de Escritores Gabriela Mistral stands out, in Los Andes, and Tercer Encuentro Internacional de Historia y Literatura Araucanía 2017 of The university of la Frontera, in Temuco.

Still in 2017, he premiered his literary recognition with the first prize in the Gonzalo Rojas Pizarro Literary contest. This was followed by other awards in Argentina and Chile, as well as the publication of his first book, El hombre del terrón de azúcar y otros cuentos. At the end of this year, he founded the RunRun storytelling group, presenting his work in various libraries and schools in Maule and O'Higgins. Around this period, he began using the literary pseudonym José Baroja, under which he has published much of his work. The pseudonym originated in Lebu, Chile, and combines the names of two writers he admired: José Saramago and Pío Baroja. “José” was taken from the Portuguese Nobel Prize-winning writer, while “Baroja” was adopted from the Basque novelist Pío Baroja.

In 2018, after participating in some interviews about the death of Nicanor Parra, Baroja was invited to Mexico for the first time, first for the XI Encuentro Internacional de Investigadores de Lengua y Literatura and the XII Festival Internacional de Literatura "Palabra en el Mundo", organized by Universidad Autónoma de Chiapas in Tuxtla Gutiérrez and San Cristóbal de las Casas, and, later, for the Guadalajara International Book Fair. In October of that same year, he published several articles and stories about the social outburst in Chile. In November, he was invited to participate in the First Chonchón Latin American Meeting of Poets and Narrators, in Lebu, Chile.

In 2019, after a fleeting visit to Mexico City, Toronto, Barcelona and Buenos Aires, the latter places where El curioso caso de la sombre que murió como un recuerdo y otros cuentos and Cuentos Reunidos-Antología Breve are born, he decided to migrate to Guadalajara, Mexico. Later that year, he co-founded in Lebu, Chile, the arts and letters magazine Sudras y Parias, together with Chilean writers Jaime Magnan and Alfredo Ojeda Torres and was invited to the Fourth Meeting of Writers of Tapachula, in Chiapas.

During his stay in Mexico, Baroja became a member of the Poets of the World Movement, in addition to becoming the co-founder of Audacia Editorial, in Zapopan, Jalisco.

In 2020, he participated in the International Festival of Sonora Literature, in San Luis Río Colorado and publish in Lima, Peru, El lado oscuro de la sombra y otros ladridos.

In 2021, No fue un catorce de febrero y otros cuentos is published in Spain.

In 2022, he married the Mexican writer Leyda Mariscal.

In 2023 he is incorporated as an author in the directory of the Creative Community of Los Ríos, dependent on the Ministry of Cultures, arts and heritage of the Government of Chile. It also publishes in Barcelona, Spain, Sueño en Guadalajara y otros cuentos, a book, according to the Chilean magazine Freakopolis, that offers a unique window into everyday life and the wounds of contemporary Mexico, while it was translated into French by Agata Mendes de Carvalho in Toulouse, France, and is part of the Chilean delegation that participates in the Guadalajara International Book Fair, along with writers such as Victor Munita Fritis, Alejandro Zambra, Pablo Simonetti, María José Ferrada, the scientists Sebastián Pérez and Paula Jofré, and the visual artists Consuelo Terra, Pablo Delcielo and Catalina Bu.

In 2024, he is included in the Encyclopedia of Literature in Mexico (ELEM), a digital encyclopedia on the literature of Mexico, edited by the Foundation for Mexican Letters, supported by the Ministry of Culture and the National Institute of Fine Arts and Literature from Mexico. This year, he also becomes the host of the radio show La Otra Historia: Fútbol, Literatura y Rock & Pop, broadcast from Guadalajara and created by Chilean poet Víctor Munita Fritis and cultural manager David Meneses.

In 2025, El hombre del terrón de azúcar y otros cuentos and Un hijo de perra y otros cuentos are included in Miguel de Cervantes Virtual Library, in Madrid, Spain, and in the Chilean Digital Public Library. He also takes part in the 15th Used and Antiquarian Book Fair of Guadalajara and participates once again in the Guadalajara International Book Fair, further consolidating his relationship with Mexico.

In 2026, he participates in the Guadalajara Municipal Book Fair alongside Mexican writer Pablo Gómez Martínez. Their dialogue addressed education, civic life in Guadalajara, and the broader social implications of the 2026 FIFA World Cup, including a critical assessment of its urban, cultural, and economic effects, with particular attention to the crisis of disappeared persons in Mexico and its social impacts, including its effects on education and educational opportunities. That same year, his work as a columnist on education and society in Le Monde Diplomatique and Zona Docs stands out as significant, as it extends his intellectual concerns beyond academic and literary spaces into public debate, linking educational questions with broader social, democratic, and civic issues. This intervention is consistent with concerns that have been identified in academic analyses of his work. Donde habita el olvido is published in Mendoza, Argentina.

== Style and influences ==
Baroja's narrative is characterized by a simple and well-kept language, although with a complex background that requires an important cultural background. He uses contained, precise language that unsettles more by what it suggests than by what it shows. In contrast, his poetry tends towards the visceral and little content. Among his narrative influences, Jorge Luis Borges, María Luisa Bombal, Manuel Rojas and Oscar Wilde stand out, authors from whom he takes satire, irony and care for the language. It is correct to affirm that Baroja's literature moves between the fantastic and social realism, even delving into the absurdity and psychology of despair.

In his prose, the city is not just a mere backdrop, but a living entity that participates in the stories, another character with its own mysteries. The characters, even though they are sunk in misery, retain something deeply human: desire, shame, fear, resistance. Osorio says in an article titled Absence, Language and Cracks: "Baroja plays with silence and with what is not said." In the words of Betty Cuevas: “He is a writer who allows himself to be transformed by Mexico—by its rhythms and tensions, by its urban imaginaries, and by its cultural machinery, vast and sometimes chaotic.” The stories are incisive, brief, sometimes ferocious, intent on exposing the moral fissures of characters who live on the margins or in the cracks of a social order that suffocates them. Baroja denounces, without subtlety, the structural inequality that permeates the labor market. Instead of focusing on the construction of the self, he narrates through voices that observe more than they declare, characters overwhelmed by their own fragility. In this context, the dogs in his stories often serve as a recurring symbol of the fragile human condition within contemporary cities.

Criticism has also examined the political and symbolic dimensions of Baroja's urban settings. A similar line of reading has been applied to El lado oscuro de la sombra y otros ladridos, where the shadow motif and animal imagery have been interpreted as figures of marginality, violence and displaced forms of urban experience. An article interprets Sueño en Guadalajara y otros cuentos as a narrative in which the dream motif links memory, desire and social fragmentation, presenting Guadalajara as a symbolic territory where contemporary Mexican tensions are refracted through fiction. Similarly, other critics have analyzed the representation of Guadalajara in Baroja's fiction as a fragmented urban space shaped by power relations and everyday precariousness. As a teacher, he has also addressed the issue from a critical perspective on contemporary education, arguing that schools increasingly privilege measurable skills, employability, and productivity over the slower humanistic formation required for deep reading, critical judgment, and democratic citizenship.

== Works ==
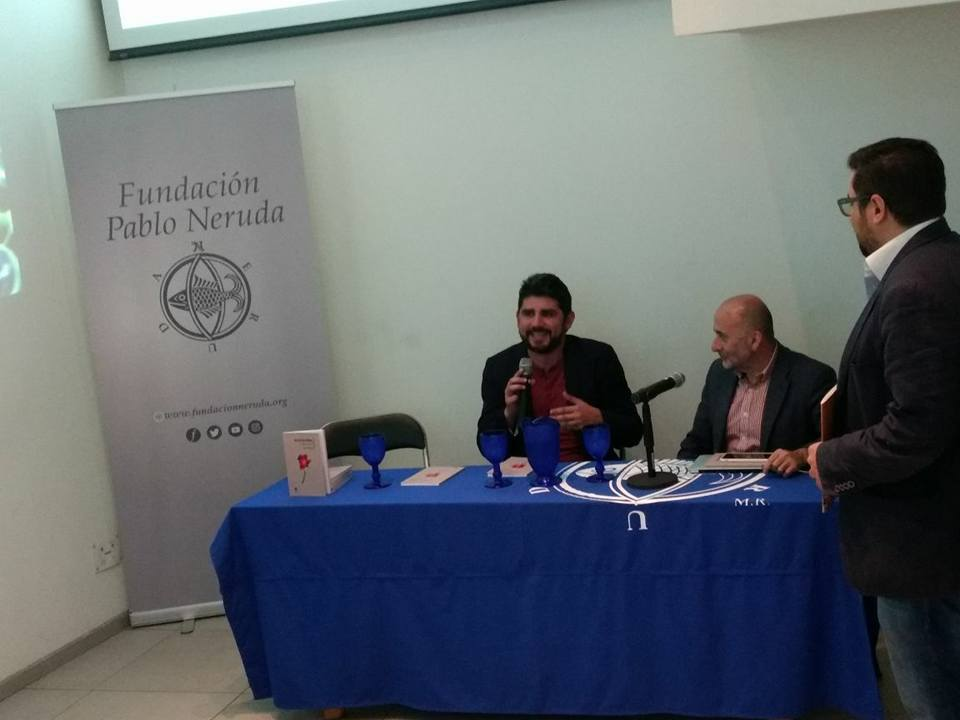
José Baroja at Pablo Neruda Foundation

Short story collections

- El hombre del terrón de azúcar y otros cuentos.
- Un hijo de perra y otros cuentos.
- En memoria del alma de Don Trementino Marabunta y otros cuentos.
- El curioso caso de la sombra que murió como un recuerdo y otros cuentos.
- Historia de dos hombres que se extraviaron en el olvido y otros relatos.
- Cuentos Reunidos–Antología Breve.
- Cuentos de un escritor chileno en México.
- Cuentos de un escritor trasnochado, en formato braille.
- Sobre la extraordinaria memoria de Ernesto Faundez Sanhueza.
- El lado oscuro de la sombra y otros ladridos.
- No fue un catorce de febrero y otros cuentos.
- Sueño en Guadalajara y otros cuentos.
- Donde habita el olvido.

Poetry

- Mi último invierno-Antología de un hombre que está cansado.

Other works

- Sobre la novela picaresca: Presentación Alonso, mozo de muchos amos, edición crítica de M. D. Miguel Donoso.
- El teatro de Brecht como visión crítica de un hombre de la Modernidad.
- Acerca del ser brasileño como figura identitaria en el modernismo.
- Hernán Rivera Letelier: La pampa salitrera como paradigma poscolonial de la identidad chilena.
- "El Laberinto De La Soledad de Octavio Paz como síntesis de la modernidad latinoamericana". En Octavio Paz and India: Enduring Resonances.
- Emergencia del sujeto marginal en Hijo de ladrón de Manuel Rojas.
- Algunos apuntes sobre la novela negra latinoamericana a partir de La ciudad está triste de Ramón Díaz Eterovic.
- Sobre estructura y recepción textual de Historia de la monja alférez.
- Breve comentario acerca de la construcción de la Antígona de Sófocles.
- Apuntes acerca de La sombra tras el muro de Verónica Zondek.
- Cuando la escuela dejo de pensar.
- La sociedad que olvidó a sus profesores.
- Cuando una ciudad aprende a convivir con sus desaparecidos: Mundial, memoria y desaparición en la Guadalajara de 2026.
- Cuando el Mundial dejó de representar al mundo.
- El aprendizaje de la indiferencia.
- Chile: cuando el miedo reemplaza el futuro.

== Awards and honours ==
Baroja's awards include the Gonzalo Rojas Pizarro International Contest, in Chile, Tierras Poéticas and Exilio, in Argentina.

Likewise, his participation in numerous anthologies, both in English and Spanish, stands out, among which we can name Alien Minds, a publication in English by La Rama Dorada, Argentina, Nueva Poesía y Narrativa Hispanoamericana del Siglo XXI, by Ediciones Lord Byron, in Madrid, Spain, The 100 most outstanding writers of Ibero-America, from Ediciones Hispana, in the United States, versions 2018–2019, 2020–2021 and 2022–2023, Escritor Libre Internacional, from Tahiel Ediciones, in Buenos Aires, Argentina, and Homenaje an escritores de Jalisco, from Maya Cartonera publishing house, in Chiapas, Mexico. Finally, he has appeared in different literary magazines and publications devoted to social criticism, such as Revista Verbo (Des)nudo, in Chile, Revista Guardatextos and Revista Interpretextos, in Mexico, Revista Guardarraya and Revista Contrapunto de la Universidad de Alcalá, in Spain, science fiction magazine Teoría Omicrón, in Ecuador, Disparates fanzine and Le Monde Diplomatique, in France, Revista Cultural Calle B,14 in Cuba, Zona Docs and Revista Común, in Mexico, and La Voz de Maipú, in Chile, among others.
