= Víctor Rodríguez Núñez =

Cuban poet, journalist, literary critic, & translator (born 1955)

- Born: 1955 (age 70–71); Havana, Cuba
- Education: Universidad de La Habana (BA) University of Oregon (MA) University of Texas, Austin (PhD)
- Occupations: Poet, journalist, literary critic and translator
- Website: Official website

Víctor Rodríguez Núñez (born in Havana, 1955) is a Cuban poet, journalist, literary critic and translator.

In addition to Cuba, he has lived in Nicaragua, Colombia, and the United States, where he is Professor Emeritus of Spanish at Kenyon College.

== Poetry ==
Rodríguez Núñez has published over one hundred editions of poetry, including:

- Cayama (Santiago de Cuba: Uvero, 1979)
- Con raro olor a mundo (Havana: Unión, 1981)
- Noticiario del solo (Havana: Letras Cubanas, 1987)
- Cuarto de desahogo (Havana: Unión, 1993)
- Los poemas de nadie y otros poemas (Intro. Juan Manuel Roca. Medellín: Tecnológico de Antioquia, 1994)
- El último a la feria (San José de Costa Rica: EDUCA, 1995)
- Los poemas de nadie seguido de El último a la feria. (Havana: Letras Cubanas, 1999)
- Oración inconclusa (Seville: Renacimiento, 2000)
- Oración inconclusa. (Havana: Unión, 2000)
- Con raro olor a mundo: Primera antología (Havana: Unión, 2004)
- Actas de medianoche I (Valladolid: Junta de Castilla y León, 2006)
- Actas de medianoche II (Soria: Diputación Provincial de Soria, 2007)
- Con raro olor a mundo: Tercera antología. San José de Costa Rica: Casa de Poesía, 2007.
- Actas de medianoche. (Havana: Letras Cubanas, 2008)
- Actas de medianoche y otros poemas. Intro. Reina María Rodríguez. (Havana: Torre de Letras, 2008)
- Actas de medianoche. (Caracas: Monte Ávila, 2009)
- Todo buen corazón es un prismático: Antología poética, 1975-2005. Intro. Juan Gelman. (Mexico: La Cabra Ediciones-UANL, 2010)
- Intervenciones: Antología poética. Ed. and Intro. Juan Carlos Abril. (Santander [Spain]: La Mirada Creadora, 2010)
- tareas (Seville: Renacimiento, 2011)
- reversos (Madrid: Visor, 2011)
- reversos (Guadalajara: Mantis Editores-Escritores de Cajeme, 2011)
- thaw/deshielos. Trans. Katherine Hedeen. (Todmorden: Arc Publications, 2013)
- desde un granero rojo. (Madrid: Hiperión, 2013)
- Cuarto de desahogo: Antología personal, 1975-2010. (Havana: Letras Cubanas, 2013)
- deshielos. (Granada: Valparaíso Ediciones, 2014)
- desde un granero rojo: poesía reciente. (Quito: ElÁngelEditor, 2014)
- El mundo cabe en un alejandrino: poesía 1979-2014. (Cordoba, Argentina: Alción, 2015)
- deshielos & desde un granero rojo. (Havana: Letras Cubanas, 2015)
- despegue. (Madrid: Visor, 2016)
- La noche mal escrita: antología personal 2000-2016. (Bogotá: Los Torreones, 2016)
- Oración inconclusa: Poesía 1979-2016. (Quito: ElÁngel, 2016)
- Del arcoíris y el relámpago: Antología. Ed. Villavicencio & Almonte. (Santiago de Chile: DesContexto, 2017)
- inversa: poesía 1979-2016. (Tegucigalpa: ManoNostra 2017).
- el cuaderno de la rata almizclera. (Buenos Aires: Buenos Aires Poetry, 2017)
- despegue. (Matanzas: Matanzas, 2017)
- enseguida [o la gota de sangre en el nivel]. (Santiago de Chile-Barcelona: RIL-Ærea, 2018)
- el cuaderno de la rata almizclera. (Barcelona: La Garúa, 2018)
- tareas & reversos. (Havana: Unión, 2019)
- el cuaderno de la rata almizclera. (Matanzas: Vigía, 2019)
- ceniza de infinito. (Lima: FIP Primavera Poética-Colección Lima Lee, 2020)
- la luna según masao vicente. (Buenos Aires: Espacio Hudson, 2021)
- materia sublevada: obra selecta 1979-2018. (Santiago de Chile-Barcelona: RIL-Ærea, 2021)
- la luna según masao vicente. (Barcelona: La Garúa, 2021)
- inversa: poesía 2021-1979. Intro. Jorge Ortega. (México: Aldus-CETYS, 2021)
- la noche y cuba. (Madrid: Verbum, 2022)
- el cuaderno de la rata almizclera. (Puebla, México: Alcorce, 2023)
- la noche mal escrita: antología personal 2000-2021. (Tegucigalpa: Efímera, 2023)
- cuarto de desahogo: 1979-2000. (Tegucigalpa: Cisne Negro, 2023)
- errática. (Buenos Aires: Espacio Hudson, 2023)
- errática. (Barcelona: Luces de Gálibo, 2023)
- un álgebra salvaje. (Madrid: Huerga & Fierro, 2024)
- confirmaciones: poesía 1979-2023. (Tegucigalpa: Efímera, 2024)
- errática. (Tegucigalpa: Efímera, 2025)
- la noche mal escrita: antología personal 2000-2021. (Lima: Summa, 2025)
- cuarto de desahogo: poesía 1979-2000. (León, Spain: Eolas, 2025)
- errática y otras encrucijadas: poesía 2017-2025. (Quito: ElÁngel, 2025)
- la piedra de amolar. (Santiago de Chile-Barcelona: RIL-Ærea, 2025)
- un álgebra salvaje. (Matanzas, Cuba: Matanzas, 2026)
- Material de lectura. (México: UNAM, 2026)
- confirmaciones: poesía 1979-2026. (Tegucigalpa: Efímera, 2026)
- la noche mal escrita: antología personal 2000-2021. (Tegucigalpa: Efímera, 2026)
- tareas & despegue. (Córdoba, Argentina: Alción, 2026)
- afueras o la marmota se harta de crepúsculo [ciertos poemas 1979-2025]. (Montevideo: yaugurú, 2026)

== Poetry awards ==
Rodríguez Núñez has won numerous prizes for his poetry:

- David Prize (Cuba, 1980)
- Plural Prize (Mexico, 1983)
- EDUCA Prize (Costa Rica, 1995)
- Renacimiento Prize (Spain, 2000)
- Fray Luis de León Prize, Accésit (Spain, 2005)
- Leonor Prize (Spain, 2006)
- Rincón de la Victoria Prize (Spain, 2010)
- Jaime Gil de Biedma Prize, Accésit (Spain, 2011)
- Alfons el Magnànim Poetry Prize (Spain, 2013)
- DJS / EastWest International Poetry Award (Beijing, China, 2014)
- Loewe Foundation International Poetry Prize (Spain, 2015)
- Città di Pescara-Sinestetica International Poetry Award (Italy, 2020)
- Manuel Alcántara International Poetry Prize (Spain, 2021)
- International Poetry Festival Caracol Lifetime Achievement Award (Tijuana, México, 2023)
- International Poetry Festival of Madrid Lifetime Achievement Award (Spain, 2024)
- Ohio Art Council Individual Excellence Award (2024)
- International Poetry Festival Paralelo Cero Lifetime Achievement Award (Quito, Ecuador, 2025)
- International Poetry Festival Los Confines Lifetime Achievement Award (Gracias, Honduras, 2026)

== Poetry in translation ==
Collections of Rodríguez Núñez’s poetry have been translated into the following languages:

- Arabic
  - برائحة غريبة تُذكرُ بالعالم Trans. Abdul Hadi Sadoun. (Rabat: Editions Bouregreg, 2018)
  - برائحة غريبة تُذكرُ بالعالم Trans. Abdul Hadi Sadoun. (Beirut: Dar Khotot, 2021)
- Bengali
  - materia sublevada. Trans. Shukti Roy et al. (Kolkata: Anusha Press, 2024)
- Dutch
  - As van het oneindige. Intro. and Trans. Stefaan van den Bremt. Epil. Katherine M. Hedeen. (Leuven, Belgium: Uitgeverij P, 2022)
- English (all translations by Katherine M. Hedeen)
  - The Infinite's Ash. (Todmorden, UK: Arc Publications, 2008)
  - Every Good Heart Is a Telescope, Early Poems. (Pomona, USA: Toad Press, 2013)
  - Thaw / Deshielos. (Todmorden, UK: Arc Publications, 2013)
  - With a Strange Scent of World: Early Poems 1979-1999. (New Orleans: Diálogos, 2014)
  - tasks. (Normal, Illinois: co•im•press, 2016)
  - Night Badly Written: Poems 2000-2015. (South Bend, Indiana: Action Books, 2017)
  - inverse: 2016-1979. (Mumbai: Paperwall Books, 2019)
  - from a red barn. (Normal, Illinois: co•im•press, 2020)
  - rebel matter: poems (2000-2021). (London: Shearsman Books, 2022)
  - midnight minutes. (South Bend, Indiana: Action Books, 2024)
  - departure. (Rhydowen, UK: Broken Sleep Books, 2024)
- French
  - L’étrange odeur du monde. Trans. by Jean Portante. (Paris: L’Oreille du Loup, 2011)
  - Minutes de minuit: cinq chansons. Trans. Portante. (Paris: Al Manar, 2016)
  - dégels. Trans. Stéphane Chaumet. (Bogota: Ladrones del Tiempo, 2018)
  - minutes de minuit. Trans. and Intro. Portante. (Luxemburg: PHI, 2019)
  - erratique. Trans. Chaumet. (París: Manifeste !, 2025)
  - le cahier du rat musqué. Trans. Portante. (Algiers: Apic, 2026)
- German
  - Mit einem seltsamen Geruch nach Welt. Trans. Udo Kawasser. (Leipzig: Leipziger Literaturverlag, 2015)
- Greek
  - άγρια άλγεβρα. Trans. Maria Kalouptsi. (Athens: Irini P, 2026)
  - ανατρεπτικό υλικό [ποιήματα 2025-2005]. Trans. Dimitris Angelis. (Larissa, Greece: Thraca, 2026)
- Hebrew
  - בניחוח מוזר של עולם (שירים 1979-2016) Trans. Tal Nitzan. (Haifa: Pardes, 2017)
- Italian
  - L’ultimo alla fiera, Trans. by Emilio Coco. (Foggia: Sentieri Meridiani, 2011)
  - decollo. Ed. y Trans. Gianni Darconza. (Rimini: Raffaelli, 2017)
  - La notte scritta male. Ed. and Trans. Emilio Coco. (Rimini: Raffaelli, 2018)
  - il quaderno del topo muschiato. Trans. Alberto Pellegata. (Milan: Taut, 2020)
  - da un granaio rosso. Trans. and Intro. Darconza. (Rimini: Fara, 2021)
  - erratica. Trans., Intro. & After. Pellegatta and Pasqualino Bongiovanni. (Rome: Lebeg, 2026)
- Korean
  - 겨울이 있는 시. Trans. Hyeon-kyun Kim. (Seoul: 노작홍사용문학관, 2019)
- Macedonian
  - Секое добро срце е телескоп. Trans. Marija Krstevska. (Struga: Struga Poetry Evening P, 2014)
  - Секое добро срце е телескоп. Trans. Marija Petrovska. (Skopje: Aleph, 2023)
- Portuguese
  - uma álgebra selvagem: certos poemas 1979-2018. Trans. Prisca Agustoni and Edimilson de Almeida Pereira. (São Paulo: Jabuticaba, 2023)
  - matéria sublevada. Trans. Prisca Agustoni, Edimilson de Almeida Pereira and João Rasteiro. (Porto, Portugal: Exclamação!, 2023)
- Romanian
  - marmota se satură de crepuscul. Trans. and intro. Dinu Flămând. (Bucharest: Tracus Arte, 2025)
- Serbian
  - Свако добро срце има облик призме, Trans. by Радивоје Константиновић. (Novisad: Adresa, 2014)
- Swedish
  - Världen ryms i en alexandrin, Trans. by Lasse Söderberg. (Malmö: Aura Latina, 2011)
- Turkish
  - başkaldıran madde: şiirler 2000-2021. Trans. Pelin Kıvrak. Istambul: 1984 P, 2023)
- Vietnamese
  - nghịch đảo: thơ tuyển, 1979–2016. Trans. VŨ VIỆT HÙNG. (Hanoi: Vietnam Writers Association P, 2020)

A wide selection of his poetry has also been translated into Hungarian, Lithuanian, Russian, and Slovenian.

== Translation ==
Rodríguez Núñez is also a translator.

From English into Spanish, titles include:

- Poesía. By Jaroslav Seifert. Trans. with Viera Piñón. (Havana: Arte y Literatura, 1987)
- Esto sucede cuando el corazón de una mujer se rompe. By Margaret Randall. (Madrid: Hiperion, 1999)
- El silo: Una sinfonía pastoral [with Katherine Hedeen]. By John Kinsella. (Havana: Arte y Literatura, 2005)
- América o el resplandor [with Katherine Hedeen]. By John Kinsella. (Havana: Torre de Letras, 2006 and Mexico: Mantis, 2013)
- En esa redonda nación de sangre: Poesía indígena estadounidense contemporánea [with Katherine Hedeen]. Intro. Janet McAdams. (Mexico: La Cabra-CONACULTA, 2011 and Havana: Arte y Literatura, 2013)
- América o el brillo. By Kinsella. Trans. with Hedeen. (Guadalajara: Mantis, 2013)
- La vida incesante y otros poemas [with Katherine Hedeen]. By Mark Strand. (Mexico: El Tucán de Virginia, 2013)
- La reinvención del olvido: Antología personal. By Jean Portante. Intro. and Trans. with Jorge Miralles. (Mexico: La Otra-Instituto de Cultura del Estado de Durango, 2013)
- En esa redonda nación de sangre: Poesía indígena estadounidense contemporánea. Intro. McAdams. (Ed. and Trans. with Hedeen. Havana: Arte y Literatura, 2013)
- America. By Kinsella. Trans. with Hedeen. (Holguin, Cuba: Ediciones Holguín, 2014)
- El silo: Una sinfonía pastoral. By Kinsella. Trans. with Hedeen. (Cordoba, Argentina: Alción, 2015)
- Nuestra tierra de nadie: Poesía galesa contemporánea. Intro. Zoë Skoulding. Ed. and Trans. with Hedeen. (Mexico: La Otra-Praxis, 2015)
- El campo. By Martin Glaz Serup. Trans. with Hedeen. (Mexico. Valparaíso, 2017)
- El lenguaje del tiempo (Poemas 1985-2017). By Randall. Ed., intro. and trans. with Hedeen. (Quito: ElÁngel, 2017)
- Cuando la justicia se sentía en casa. By Randall. Trans. with Hedeen. (Matanzas: Vigía, 2018)
- Las habitaciones y otros poemas. By Skoulding. Ed. and Trans. with Hedeen. (San José de Costa Rica: Casa de Poesía, 2018)
- Nuestra tierra de nadie: Poesía galesa contemporánea. Intro. Skoulding. Ed. and Trans. with Hedeen. (Bogota: Uniediciones-Ladrones del Tiempo, 2018)
- En esa redonda nación de sangre: Poesía indígena estadounidense contemporánea. Intro. McAdams. Ed. and Trans. with Hedeen. (Bogota: Uniediciones-Ladrones del Tiempo, 2018)
- El silo: Una sinfonía pastoral. By Kinsella. Trans. with Hedeen. (Barcelona: La Garúa, 2019)
- Búfalo en seis direcciones y otros poemas. By McAdams. Trans. with Hedeen. (San José de Costa Rica: Casa de Poesía, 2019)
- Espejos cortados a la medida (Poemas 1985-2019). By Randall. Ed., intro. and trans. with Hedeen. (Bogota: Caza de Libros-Gimnasio Moderno, 2019)
- El campo. By Glaz Serup. Trans. with Hedeen. (Matanzas: Matanzas, 2019)
- El lenguaje del tiempo. By Randall. Trans. with Hedeen. (Quito. ElÁngel, 2019)
- Poemas escogidos. By James Byrne. Trans. with Hedeen. (Buenos Aires: Buenos Aires Poetry. 2019)
- Búfalo en seis direcciones y otros poemas. By McAdams. Trans. with Hedeen. (Mexico: Aldus, 2021)
- Búfalo en seis direcciones y otros poemas. By McAdams. Trans. with Hedeen. (Buenos Aires: Espacio Hudson, 2021)
- Círculos concéntricos. By Yang Lian. Intro. and Trans. with Hedeen and Frances Simán. (Madrid: Visor, 2024)
- Una con otros. By C.D. Wright. Intro. and trans. with Hedeen. (Barcelona: Kriller71, 2024)
- La enciclopedia de las cosas olvidadas. By Gokçenur Ç. Trans. with Hedeen. (Tegucigalpa: Efímera, 2025)
- Espectro del mojave. By Forrest Gander. Trans. with Hedeen. (Tegucigalpa: Efímera, 2025)
- Verano. By Johannes Göransson. Trans. with Hedeen. (Santiago de Chile-Barcelona: RIL-Æerea, 2025)
- Los muertos y los vivos. By Sharon Olds. Trans. with Katherine M. Hedeen. (Madrid: Visor, 2025)

From Spanish into English:

- The Poems of Sidney West. By Juan Gelman. Trans. with Katherine Hedeen. (Cambridge: Salt Publishing, 2009)
- Diary with No Subject. By Juan Calzadilla. Trans. with Hedeen. (Cambridge: Salt Publishing, 2009)
- Garden of Silica. By Ida Vitale. Trans. with Hedeen. (Cambridge: Salt Publishing, 2010)
- Blue Coyote with Guitar. By Juan Bañuelos. Trans. with Hedeen. (Cambridge: Salt Publishing, 2010)
- The Bridges By Fayad Jamís. Trans. with Hedeen. (Cambridge: Salt Publishing, 2011)
- Friday in Jerusalem and Other Poems. By Marco Antonio Campos. Trans. with Hedeen. (Cromer: Salt Publishing, 2012)
- Selected Poems. By José Emilio Pacheco. Trans. with Hedeen. (Struga: Struga Poetry Evenings, 2013)
- The World So Often: Poems 1982-2008. By Luis García Montero. Trans. with Hedeen (Cromer: Salt Publishing2013)
- “Letter to My Mother” By Juan Gelman. Pinholes in the Night: Essential Poems from Latin America. Sel. Raúl Zurita. Ed. Gander. Trans. with Hedeen. (Port Townsend, USA: Copper Canyon Press., 2014, 216-231)
- To World. By Gelman. Ed., Intro. and Trans. with Hedeen. (Cromer, UK: Salt Publishing, 2014)
- The Art of Keeping Quiet. By Rodolfo Alonso. Ed. and Trans. with Hedeen. (Cromer, UK: Salt Publishing, 2015)
- Paradise Empty: Poems 1983-2013. By Hugo Mujica. Ed., Intro. and Trans. with Hedeen. (Todmorden, UK: Arc Publications, 2015)
- prepoems in postspanish. By Jorgenrique Adoum. Trans. with Hedeen. Pittsburgh: Eulalia, 2019.
- In the Drying Shed of Souls: Poetry from Cuba’s Generation Zero. Ed., Intro. and Trans. with Hedeen. (New York. The Operating System. 2019)
- prepoems in postspanish and other poems. By Jorgenrique Adoum. Trans. with Hedeen. (South Bend: Action Books, 2021)
- Book of the Cold. By Antonio Gamoneda. Trans. with Hedeen. (Storrs, Connecticut: World Poetry Books, 2022)
- Burn the Losses. By Gamoneda. Trans. with Hedeen. (South Bend: Action Books, 2025)

From 2008 to 2015 he was an Associate Editor for Salt Publishing’s Earthwork’s Series of Latin American Poetry in Translation.

== Literary criticism ==
Rodríguez Núñez has compiled three influential anthologies that have defined his poetic generation:

- Cuba: En su lugar la poesía (Mexico: U Autónoma Metropolitana-Azcapotzalco, 1982)
- Usted es la culpable: Nueva poesía cubana (Havana: Editora Abril, 1985)
- El pasado del cielo: La nueva y novísima poesía cubana (Medellín: Alejandría Editores, 1994)

Most recently, he introduced and compiled a major anthology of 20th century poetry in Cuba, Poesía cubana: Antología esencial, for the Spanish publisher Visor (Madrid: 2011).

His book-length study on Gabriel García Márquez’s non-fiction, Cien años de solidaridad (Havana: Unión, 1986) was awarded the Enrique José Varona Prize in 1986.

Rodríguez Núñez has published various critical editions, introductions, and essays on Spanish American poets including:

- Oh, smog: Antología poética [with Katherine M. Hedeen]. By Juan Calzadilla. (Havana: Arte y Literatura, 2008)
- Poesía. By Francisco Urondo (Havana: Casa de las Américas, 2006)
- Oda a Rubén Darío: Poemas selectos. By José Coronel Urtecho. (Caracas: Biblioteca Ayacucho, 2005)
- La soledad de América Latina: Escritos sobre arte y literatura, 1948-1988. By Gabriel García Márquez. (Havana: Arte y Literatura, 1989)
- Cinco puntos cardinales. By Z. Valdés, J. A. Mazzotti, E. Llanos Melussa, J. R. Saravia and A. Desiderato. (Havana: Casa de las Américas, 1989)
- País secreto. By Juan Manuel Roca. (Havana: Casa de las Américas, 1987)

== Cultural journalism ==
During the eighties Rodríguez Núñez wrote for and was the editor of El Caimán Barbudo, one of Cuba’s leading cultural magazines, where he published dozens of articles on literature and film. A selection of his interviews with Hispanic poets appears in La poesía sirve para todo (Havana: Unión, 2008).

== Interviews, essays and reviews ==
- José Ángel Leyva. “Víctor Rodríguez Núñez: La poesía es algo más que literatura”. La Otra 14 (Oct.-Dec. 2011): 39-47.
- Roberto Méndez Martínez. “Víctor Rodríguez Núñez: Hacia la medianoche”. La Otra 14 (Oct.-Dec. 2011): 49-51.
- Hugo Mujica. “Todo está al otro lado de la noche”. Cuadernos Hispanoamericanos 736 (Oct. 2011): 103-114.
- Armando Chávez Rivera. “Víctor Rodríguez Núñez: Escobamarga y curujeyes”. Cuba per se: Cartas de la diáspora. Cincuenta escritores cubanos responden sobre su vida fuera de la Isla. Miami: Universal, 2009. 479-488.
- Reina María Rodríguez. “Las Actas de medianoche de VRN”. Actas de medianoche y otros poemas. By Rodríguez Núñez. Havana: Torre de Letras, 2008. 5-9.
- Juan Manuel Roca. “Postal de medianoche”. Los poemas de nadie y otros poemas. By Rodríguez Núñez. Medellin: Tecnológico de Antioquia, 1994.
