= Manuel Rojas =

Manuel Rojas may refer to:

- Manuel Rojas (independence leader) (1831–1903), Venezuelan born Puerto Rican independence leader in the El Grito de Lares revolt against Spanish colonial rule
- Manuel Rojas (author) (1896–1973), Chilean writer
- Manuel Rojas (footballer) (born 1954), retired football midfielder from Chile
- Manuel Rojas (cinematographer) (1930–1995), Goya award-winning Spanish cinematographer
- Manuel Rojas Molina (born 1959), Chilean politician
