= Pablo Neruda Ibero-American Poetry Award =

Chilean poetry award

- Named for Pablo Neruda
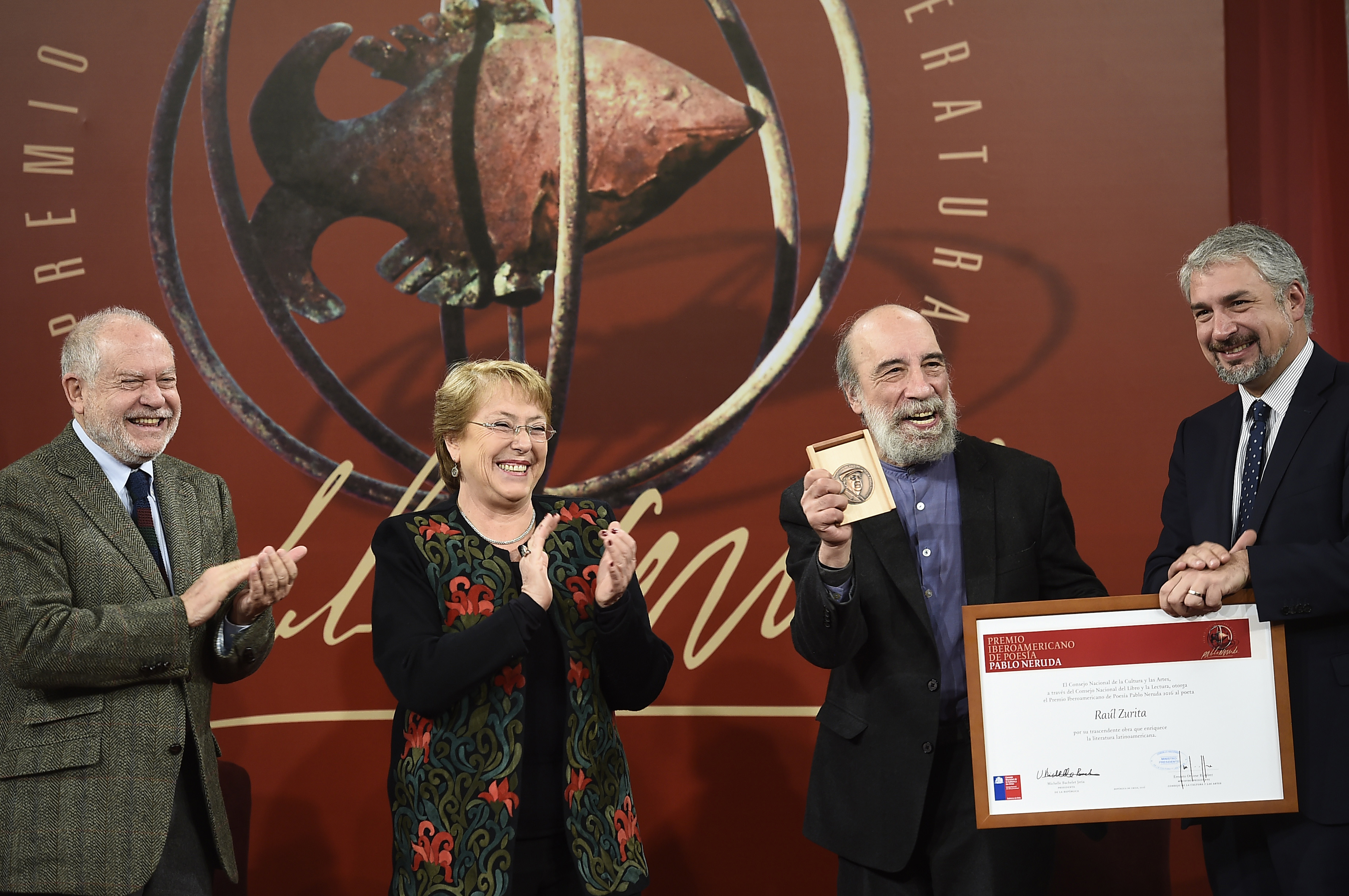
- The Chilean Raúl Zurita receiving the award in 2016 from President Michelle Bachelet and minister Ernesto Ottone
- Awarded for: Poetry
- Sponsored by: National Council of Culture and the Arts; BancoEstado; Pablo Neruda Foundation
- Location: Santiago
- Country: Chile
- First award: 2004
- Currently held by: Elvira Hernández

The Pablo Neruda Ibero-American Poetry Award (Spanish: Premio Iberoamericano de Poesía Pablo Neruda) is an annual award granted by the National Council of Culture and the Arts (CNCA) of Chile, through the National Book and Reading Council.

It was created in 2004 by agreement between the CNCA, BancoEstado (sponsor), and the Pablo Neruda Foundation (sponsor) as a tribute to the centenary of the birth of poet Pablo Neruda. It is granted annually "to an author who has a distinguished career and whose work is a notable addition to the cultural and artistic dialogue of Ibero-America."

The prize consists of US$60,000, a medal, and a diploma.

In 2012, for the first time, its prose counterpart was presented: the Manuel Rojas Ibero-American Narrative Award, in honor of the author of Hijo de ladrón, which on that occasion was won by the Brazilian Rubem Fonseca.

== Winners ==
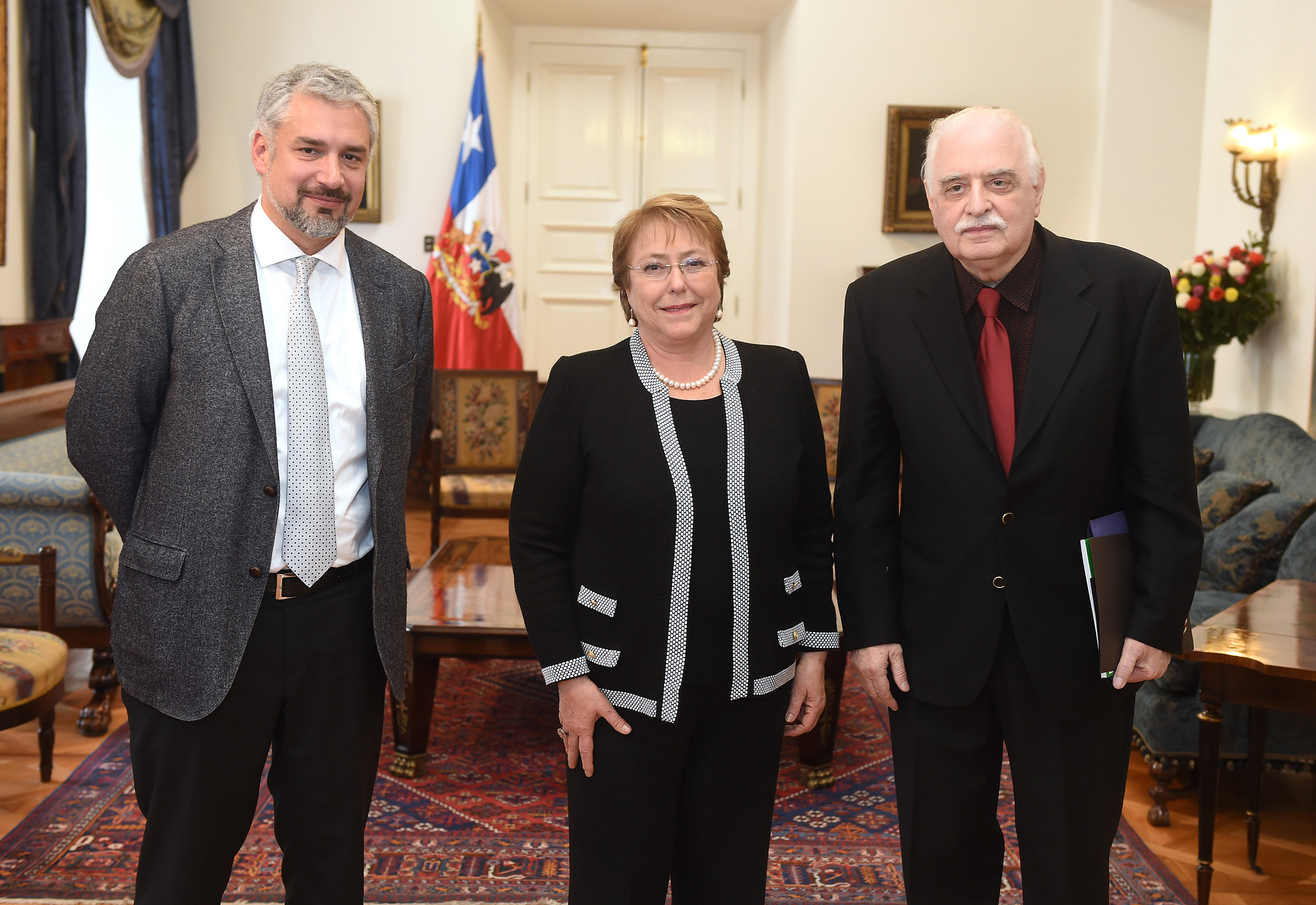
Augusto de Campos (right) receiving the award in 2015, together with President Michelle Bachelet and minister Ernesto Ottone

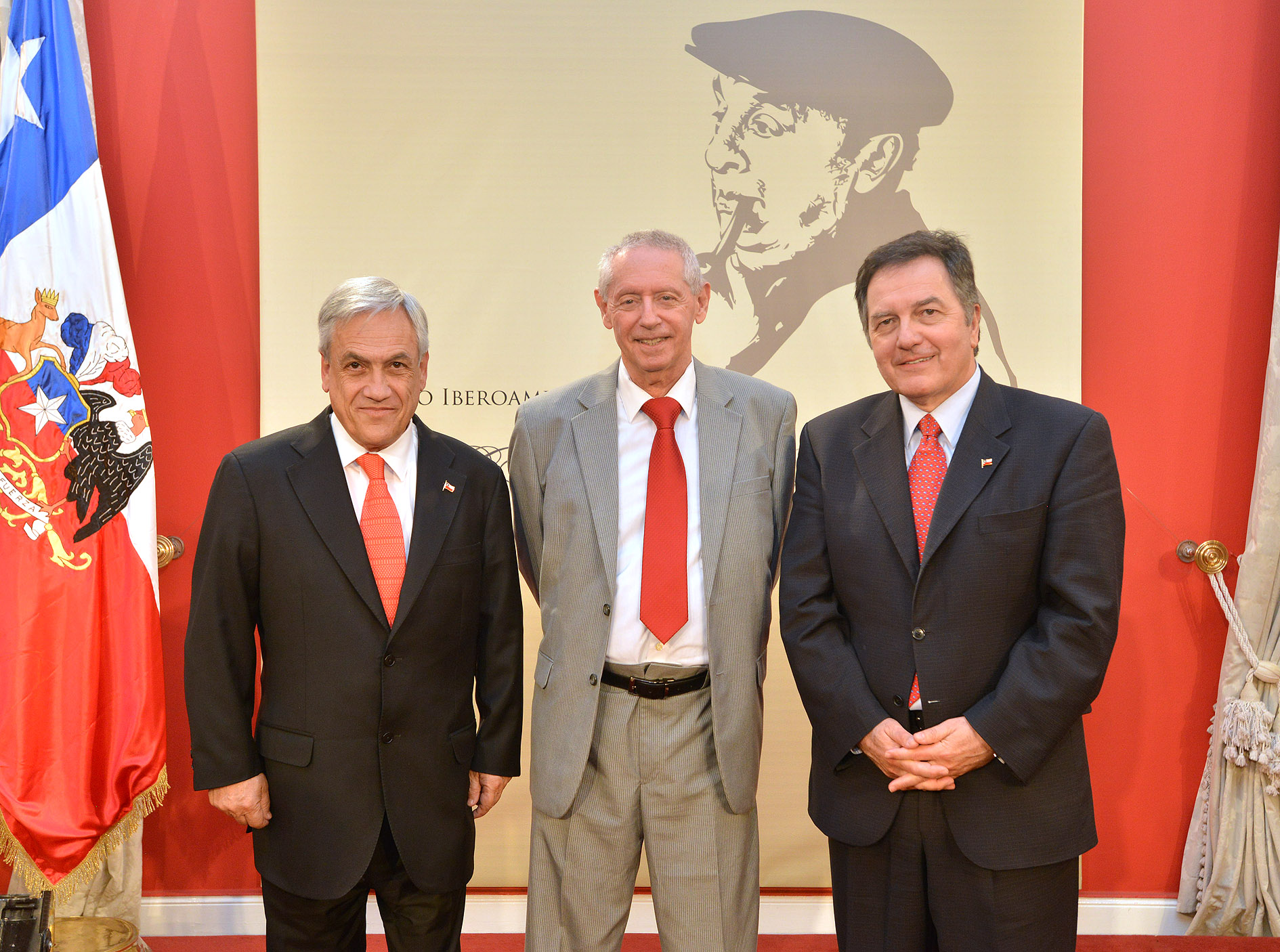
José Kozer receiving the award in 2013, together with former President Sebastián Piñera (left) and minister Roberto Ampuero (right)

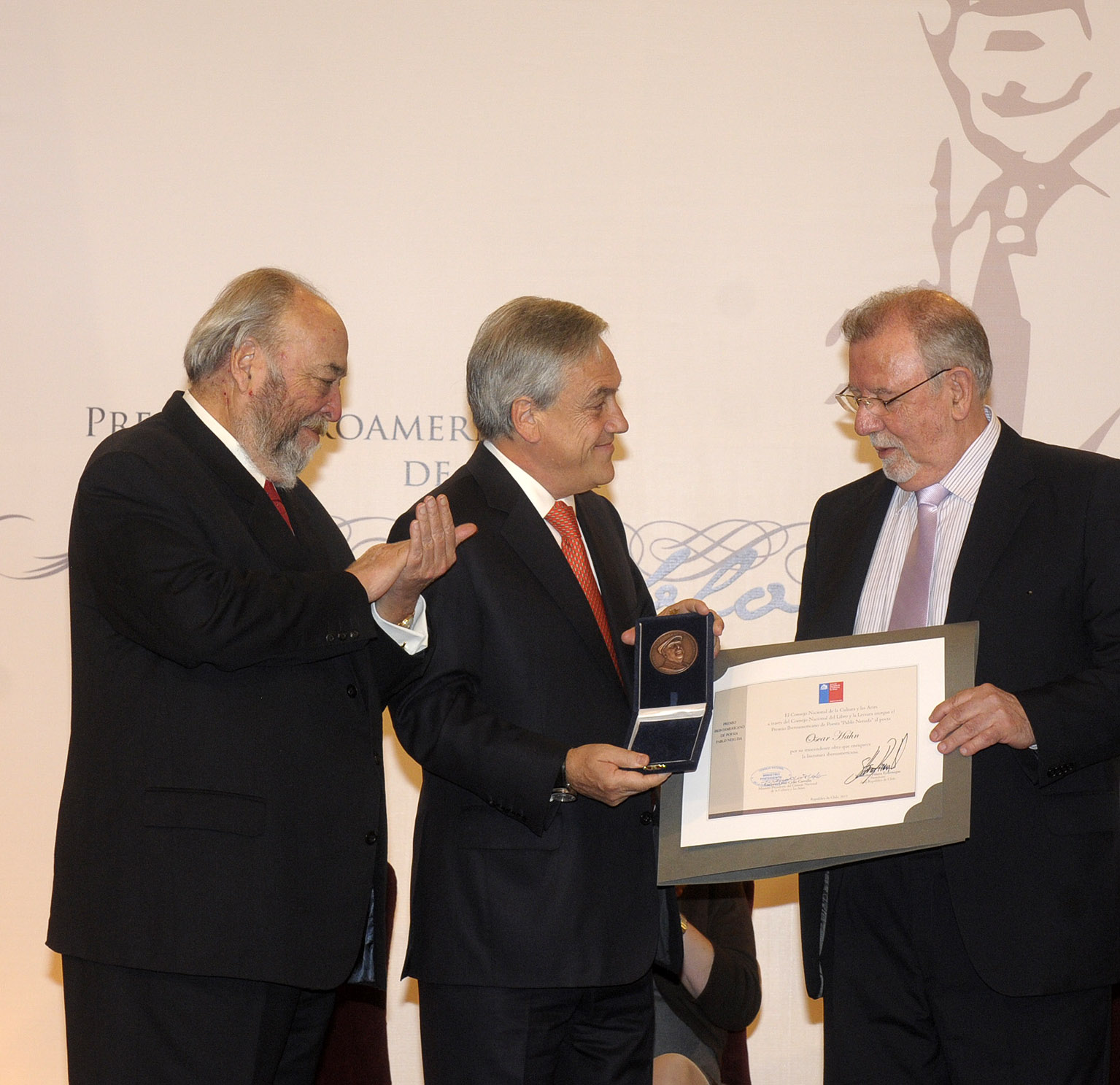
Óscar Hahn receiving the award in 2011, together with Sebastián Piñera

Year	Winner	Country	Photo
2004	José Emilio Pacheco	Mexico	
2005	Juan Gelman	Argentina	
2006	Carlos Germán Belli	Peru	
2007	Fina García Marruz	Cuba	
2008	Carmen Berenguer	Chile	
2009	Ernesto Cardenal	Nicaragua	
2010	Antonio Cisneros	Peru	
2011	Óscar Hahn	Chile	
2012	Nicanor Parra	Chile	
2013	José Kozer	Cuba	
2014	Reina María Rodríguez	Cuba	
2015	Augusto de Campos	Brazil	
2016	Raúl Zurita	Chile	
2017	Joan Margarit	Spain	
2018	Elvira Hernández	Chile	
2019	Gloria Gervitz	Mexico	

== Books presented ==
The Anthology of Nicanor Parra by Niall Binns was compiled and published especially for the occasion of Parra receiving the award in 2012.

== See also ==
- Pablo Neruda Award, granted by the Neruda Foundation to poets under 40
- Pablo Neruda Order of Artistic and Cultural Merit, also granted by the CNCA
