= Raúl Zurita =

Chilean poet

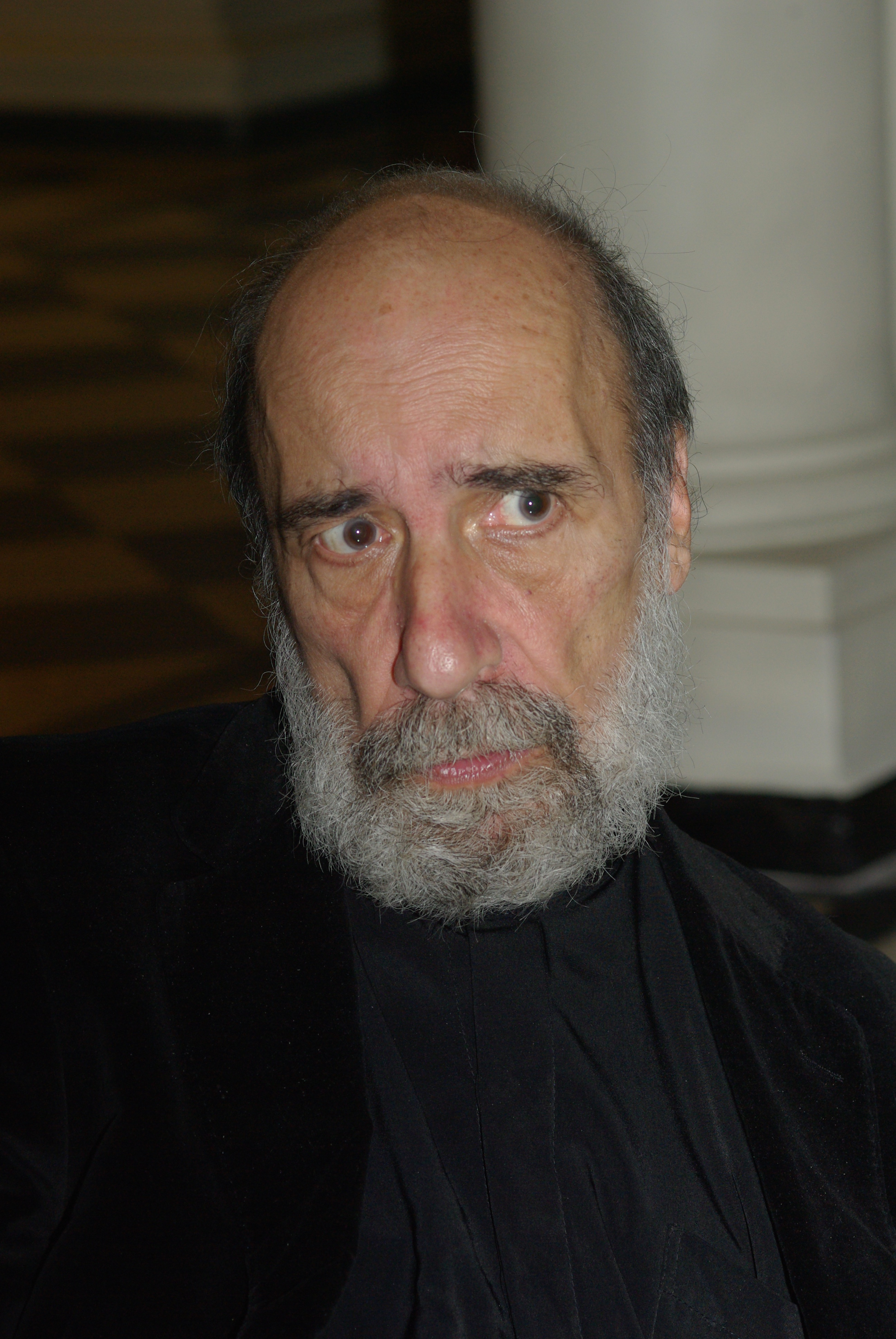
- At the Biblioteca Nacional de Santiago, 25 April 2013
- Born: January 10, 1950 (age 76); Santiago de Chile
- Education: Federico Santa María Technical University
- Occupation: Poet
- Writing career
- Language: Spanish
- Genre: Poetry
- Notable awards: Chilean National Prize for Literature (2000); Pablo Neruda Ibero-American Poetry Award (2016); Queen Sofía Ibero-American Poetry Prize (2020); Griffin Poetry Prize Lifetime Recognition (2026)

Raúl Armando Zurita Canessa (born January 10, 1950) is a Chilean poet known for his innovative and politically engaged works. He has received the Chilean National Prize for Literature (2000), the Pablo Neruda Ibero-American Poetry Award (2016), and the Queen Sofía Ibero-American Poetry Prize (2020). His major works include Purgatorio (1979), Anteparaíso (1982), and La vida nueva (2018), which combine experimental forms with public and environmental interventions. Zurita survived imprisonment and torture during the military dictatorship of Augusto Pinochet, experiences that deeply influenced his poetry. He has also worked as a cultural attaché, translator, and university professor, and his writings have been translated into multiple languages.

== Biography ==
=== Early life ===
Born to Raúl Armando Zurita Inostroza and Italian immigrant Ana Canessa Pessolo, Zurita grew up in a bilingual environment where Italian was predominantly spoken. His father, who had studied engineering, died of pleurisy at the age of 31 when Zurita was only two years old, leaving his mother to support the family through secretarial work. Zurita and his sister, Ana María, were primarily raised by their grandmother, Josefina.

Josefina held a strong attachment to Italy and viewed Chile unfavorably. Her nostalgia led her to frequently discuss Italian culture with the children during their upbringing. She often recounted passages from Dante Alighieri's Divine Comedy—particularly the section on hell, which she knew by heart—leaving a lasting impact on Zurita that would later permeate his poetry.

Zurita recalls a childhood marked by economic hardship. His family had inherited houses in Iquique whose value had diminished, though he characterizes the poverty as not proletarian in nature.

Zurita attended Liceo Lastarria and later pursued civil engineering in structures at the Federico Santa María Technical University in Valparaíso. During his university years, he became a member of the Communist Party of Chile, an affiliation he continues to maintain. Around 1970, he was part of the literary scene in Valparaíso, associating with writers including Juan Luis Martínez, Eduardo Embry, and Juan Cameron.

Zurita married Miriam Martínez Holger, a visual artist and the sister of his poet friend Juan Luis Martínez, at the age of 20. The couple had three children: Iván, Sileba, and Gaspar. The marriage ended shortly after the birth of Gaspar.

=== Military coup and dictatorship ===
On the morning of September 11, 1973, the day of the military coup led by Augusto Pinochet, Zurita was detained by a military patrol on his way to breakfast at the university. He was taken first to Playa Ancha Stadium, and four days later was held for 21 days in the cargo hold of the ship Maipo alongside approximately 800 individuals in a space designed for 50, where he endured torture.

After his release, Zurita struggled to find steady employment:

"My best job was as a salesperson for accounting machines, but it became evident that I wasn't a good salesman. I survived for years by stealing expensive books, primarily in the fields of architecture and medicine, to resell them. Until I was discovered. In 1979, when my first book, Purgatorio, was published, I could see it in the display windows of all the bookstores in Santiago. However, I couldn't enter any of them. The agreement to avoid imprisonment prohibited me from entering any bookstore, and I became blacklisted in all of them."

— Verás un mar de piedras, Fondo de Cultura Económica, Mexico, 2017

During this period, Zurita undertook various artistic actions aimed at critically and creatively expanding concepts of art and life. He used his body as a medium of expression to convey powerlessness and the need to communicate without words. In collaboration with sociologist Fernando Balcells and artists Lotty Rosenfeld, Juan Castillo, and Diamela Eltit, he founded the CADA group (Colectivo de Acciones de Arte), whose artistic stance was based on using the city as a space for creation. With Eltit, whom he met in 1974, Zurita formed a lasting partnership of a decade; they had a son together, Felipe, who is a musician.

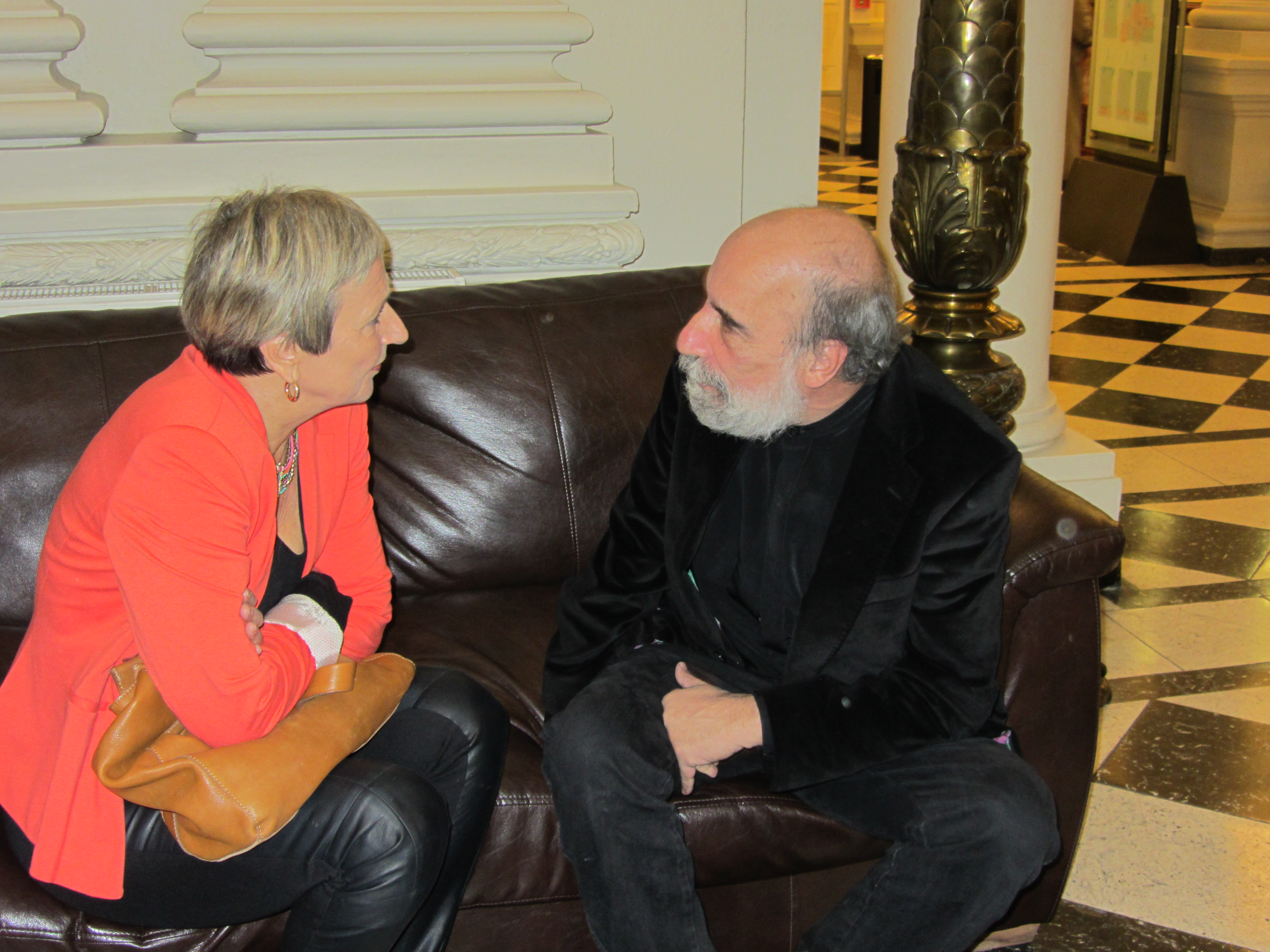
Zurita with French writer and translator Fabienne Badru, Mexico, 2013

Zurita's first book, Purgatorio (1979), bewildered readers and critics of the time with its originality and received significant critical acclaim. The cover featured a black-and-white photograph of a self-inflicted burn scar on the poet's cheek. According to Memoria Chilena, the collection marked "the first step in a project to restore the author's life—his mind, his body, his suffering—in poetry." Before this, he had published in university magazines such as Quijada and Manuscritos (Department of Humanistic Studies at the University of Chile), edited by Cristián Huneeus.

In March 1980, Zurita attempted to blind himself by pouring ammonia into his eyes. Inspired by photographs taken by his then-partner Diamela Eltit showing her own injuries and burns, he described the act as "a competition in harm, in which of the two would go further in this mutual fury that included self-destruction." The act was unsuccessful, and he retained his vision after receiving medical attention.

His second book, Anteparaíso, was published in 1982. According to Rodrigo Cánovas, author of Lihn, Zurita, Ictus, Radrigán: Chilean Literature and Authoritarian Experience, the book, like its predecessor, "represents a liberation from repressive codes that have attempted to subdue language throughout history."

On June 2, 1982, Zurita wrote the poem La vida nueva in the skies of New York City using five planes that traced letters in white smoke against the blue sky. The work consisted of fifteen phrases, each 7–9 kilometers long, written in Spanish. The event was captured on video by artist Juan Downey. In October 2012, composer Javier Farías premiered the choral piece Cantos de vida nueva in New York, based on the poem.

In 1993, Zurita inscribed the phrase Ni pena ni miedo in the Chilean desert. At 3,140 meters in length, the inscription can only be read from a high vantage point. A photograph of it concludes the book La vida nueva. Through these initiatives, Zurita aimed to transcend traditional literature and approach the concept of total art.

Between 1979 and 2016, Zurita wrote the trilogy comprising Purgatorio (1979), Anteparaíso (1982), and La vida nueva, whose final version was published in 2018. These works traverse landscapes ranging from deserts and beaches to mountains, grasslands, and rivers. Along with Canto a su amor desaparecido (1985), INRI (2003), and Zurita (2011), they are considered among his most significant contributions to literature.

=== Return to democracy ===
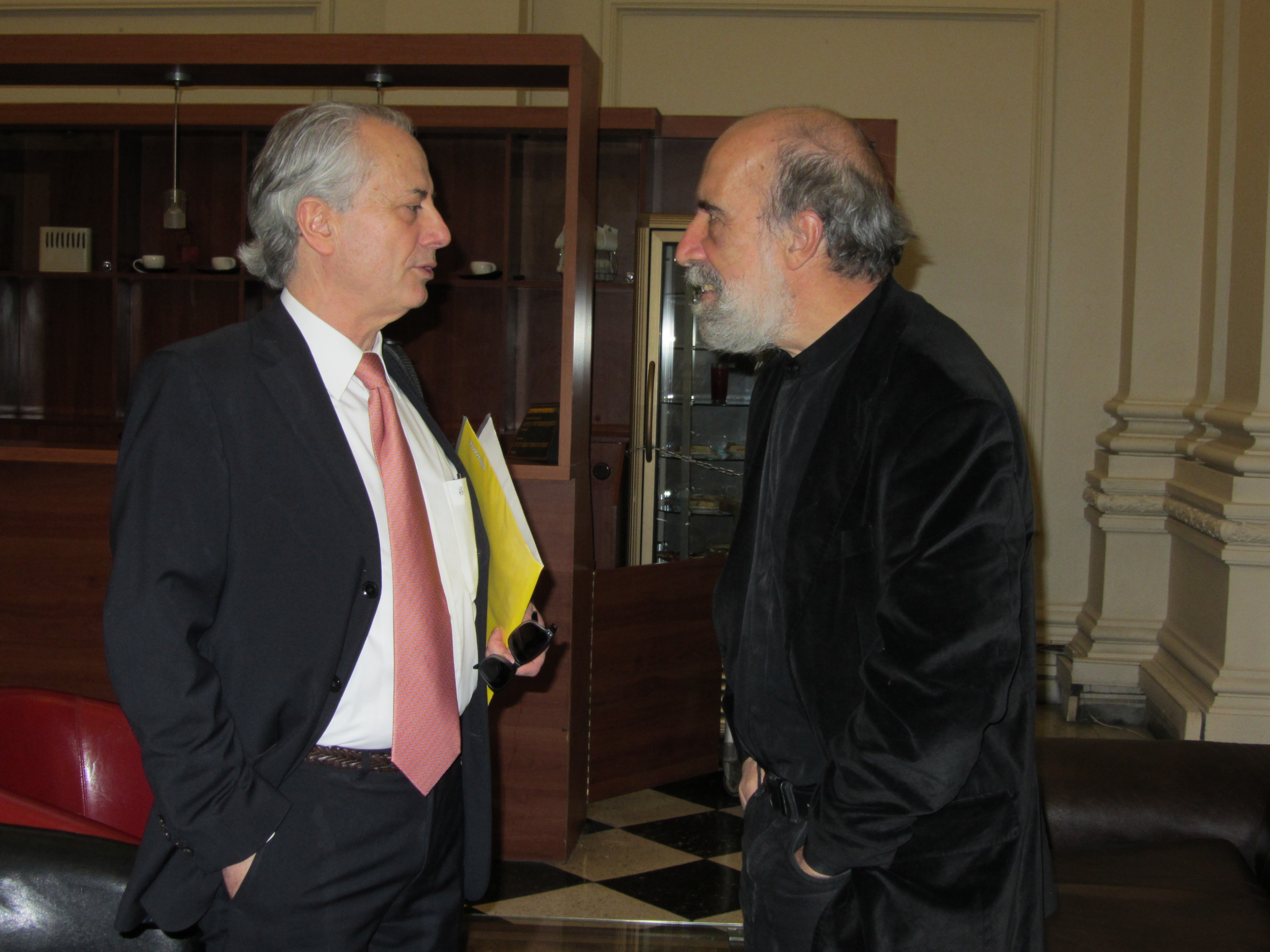
Zurita with Rodrigo Tomás, eldest son of Gonzalo Rojas, April 2013

During the presidency of Patricio Aylwin in 1990, Zurita was appointed as a cultural attaché in Rome. It was during these years that his Parkinson's disease began to manifest. In 2019, he underwent successful deep brain stimulation surgery in Milan, which greatly alleviated the disease's symptoms.

In 2001, Zurita was awarded the National Literature Prize of Chile. That same year, he separated from his third partner, Amparo Mardones Viviani, following a 15-year relationship.

In 2002, while in Berlin on a DAAD scholarship, Zurita experienced a profound sense of emptiness that led him to contemplate suicide, a feeling that emerged after he inadvertently joined a protest against George W. Bush. It was during this period that he began work on Zurita, a monumental book spanning over 750 pages. He released excerpts beginning in 2006, with the final publication in 2011. Upon returning from Berlin, he met Paulina Wendt, a fellow literature scholar at his university. They became a couple that year and married in 2009. All of Zurita's books published after 2000 are dedicated to Wendt, with the dedication in Zurita reading: "To Paulina Wendt, with whom I will die."

In mid-2007, Zurita published Los países muertos, a book that sparked controversy for its mentions of figures in the Chilean cultural scene. Later that year he published Las ciudades de agua in Mexico, followed by Cinco fragmentos in 2008. Zurita was a heavy smoker but quit in 2008 as his Parkinson's condition progressed.

In 2009 and 2010, Zurita continued releasing fragments of Zurita, in which he aimed to conclude the cycle of Purgatorio while creating an intertext with the Divine Comedy, which he was translating at the time.

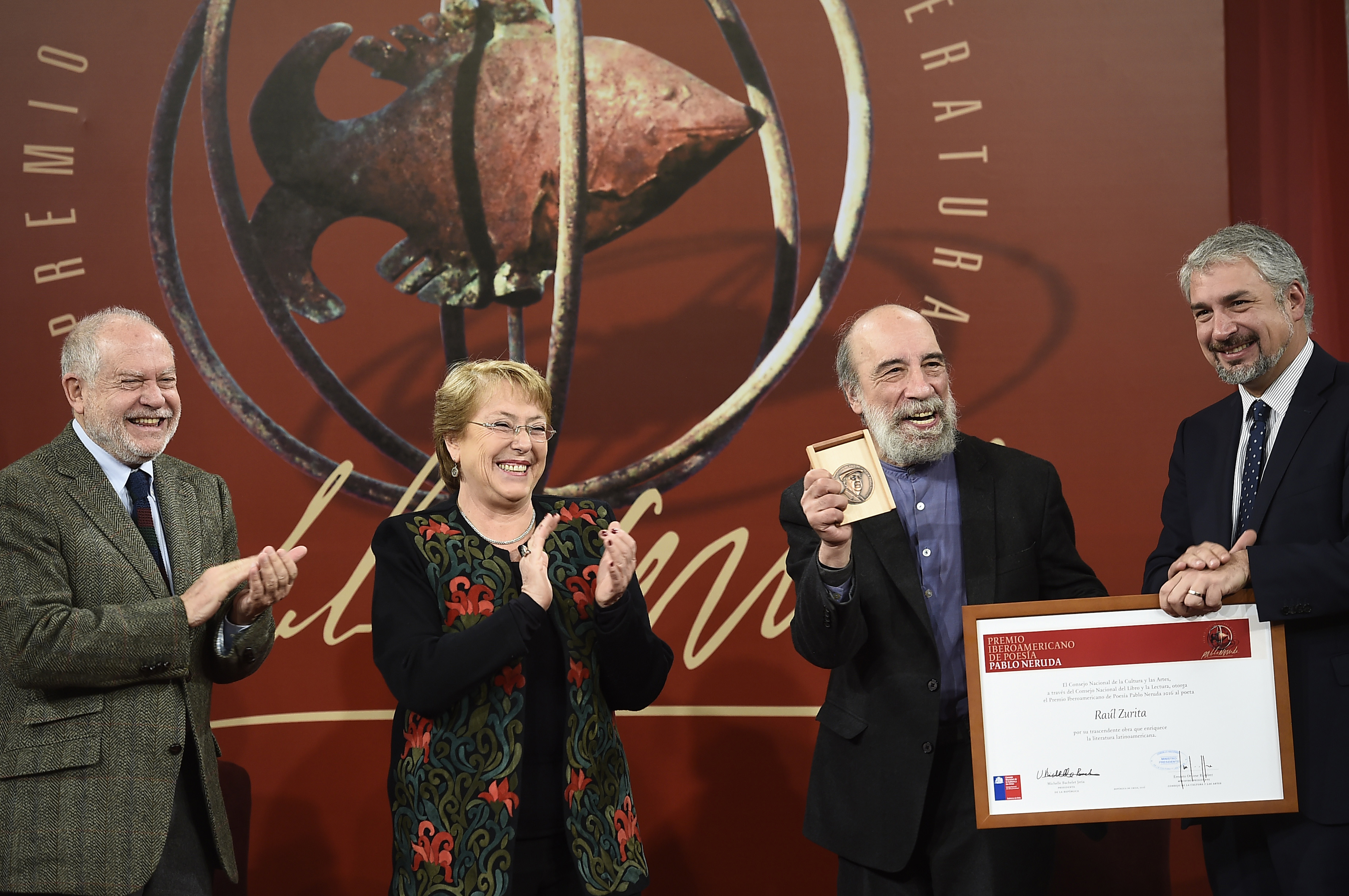
Zurita receiving the Pablo Neruda Ibero-American Poetry Award in July 2016 from President Michelle Bachelet and Minister Ernesto Ottone

On May 4, 2013, Zurita was one of the founders of the Marca AC movement, which aimed to draft a new political constitution for Chile through a constituent assembly.

On March 5, 2015, Zurita was awarded an honorary doctorate by the University of Alicante, and on November 6 of the same year by the Federico Santa María Technical University. He also holds an honorary doctorate from the University of La Frontera in Temuco and is a professor emeritus at Diego Portales University. In 2015, the Miguel de Cervantes Virtual Library inaugurated an author's library in his honor.

Zurita received the Pablo Neruda Ibero-American Poetry Award in 2016, as well as the Ibero-American Literary Creation Prize José Donoso from the University of Talca and the Asan World Prize in India, among other honors.

Books and selections of Zurita's poems have been translated into English, German, French, Arabic, Bengali, Chinese, Italian, Russian, Norwegian, Dutch, Hindi, Slovenian, and Greek. In 2019, the documentary film Zurita, Verás No Ver, directed by Alejandra Carmona, was released. That same year, scholars from multiple countries nominated him for the Nobel Prize in Literature.

Zurita has served as a visiting professor at Tufts University, the University of California, and Harvard University, and currently teaches at Diego Portales University. Numerous researchers have dedicated theses to his work, and several scholarly publications are devoted to it, including international colloquia held in France, Spain, and Chile. In 2017, the Archives Collection of the University of Poitiers in France dedicated two volumes to the critical study of his writing.

=== Foray into music ===
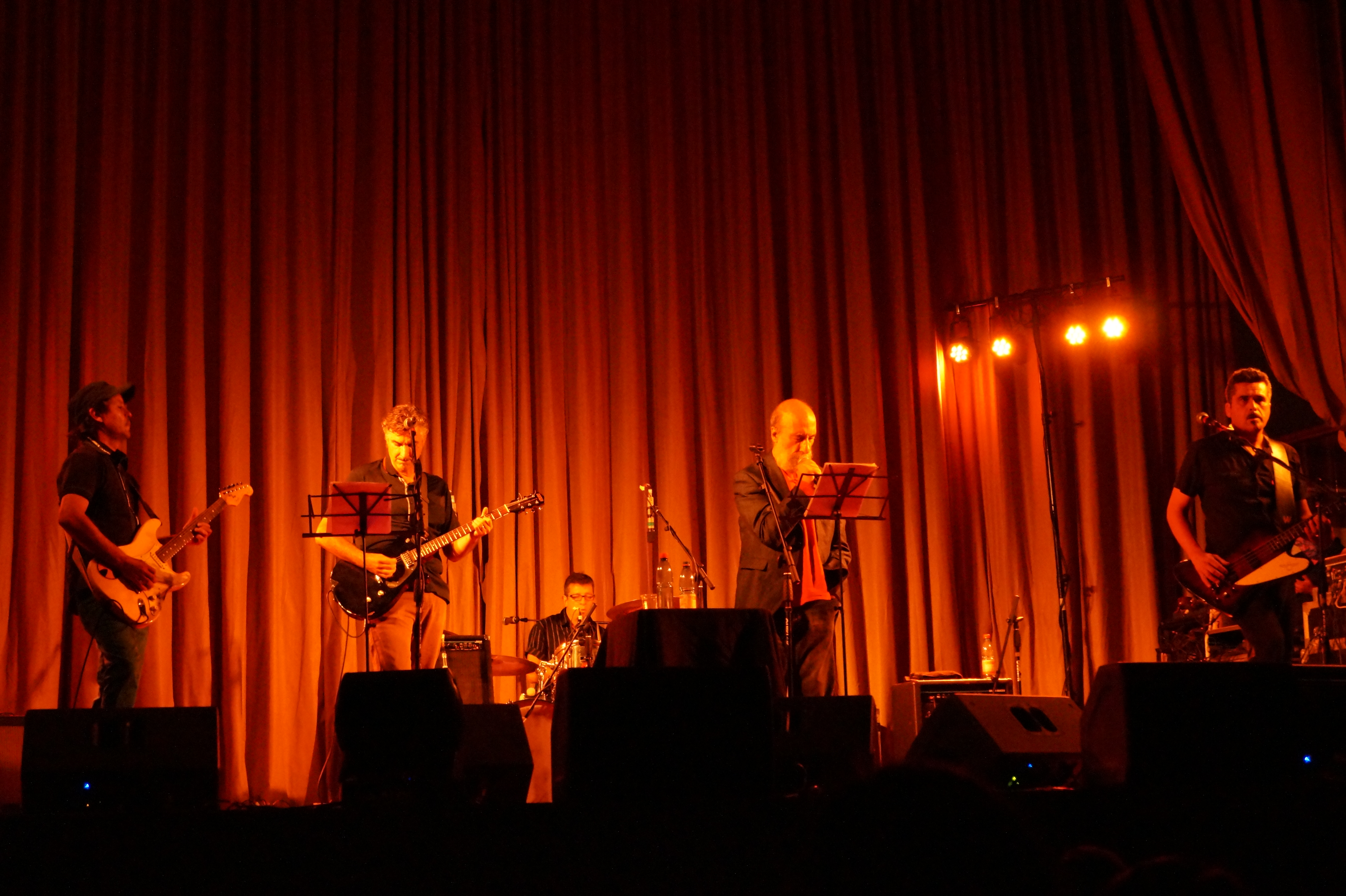
Zurita and González y Los Asistentes at the Aula Magna, University of Valparaíso, 2017

Since 2008, Zurita has collaborated with the band González y Los Asistentes, led by poet and musician Gonzalo Henríquez, to create music based on recited poems. This collaboration resulted in the album Desiertos de amor (2011), which they have performed live in Chile and Argentina.

In July 2014, Zurita participated in the 30th-anniversary concert of Chilean band Electrodomésticos, reciting the lyrics to the song "Yo la quería" from their 1986 album ¡Viva Chile!

In 2026, as part of the Griffin Poetry Prize awards event at Koerner Hall, Toronto, Zurita joined his translator, Anna Deeny Morales, for a live performance in collaboration with pianist-composer Eve Egoyan and filmmakers Lior Shamriz and Chloé Griffin. The expanded-cinema piece was commissioned as a homage to Zurita's poetry, bringing together a new musical composition and moving-images that were filmed across Chile, on location in the Atacama desert, the Pisagua cemetery, and elsewhere.

== Works ==
=== Books ===
- Purgatory (1979)
- Anteparaíso (1982)
- Paradise Is Empty (1984)
- Song of Love Gone (1985)
- The Love of Chile (1987)
- Song of the Rivers They Love (1993)
- The New Life (1994)
- The White Day (2000)
- About Love, Suffering, and the New Millennium (2000)
- Militants Poems (2000)
- INRI (2003)
- Dead Poems (2006)
- Countries Dead (2007)
- Cities Water (2008)
- In Memoriam (2008)
- Five Fragments (2008)
- Journal of War (2009)
- Dreams for Kurosawa (2010)
- Zurita (2011)

=== Public art and interventions ===
- 1982: Skywriting over New York City – 15 poems traced by 5 airplanes
- 1993: Ni pena ni miedo inscribed in the Atacama Desert – 3,140 meters in length
- 1998: Poem bulldozed in the Atacama Desert – 5 kilometers in length
- 2017: Poem installation in Kochi, India, "The Sea of Pain" – concerning the death of immigrants in the Mediterranean Sea

=== Anthologies ===
- The &NOW Awards 2: The Best Innovative Writing (2013)
- Pinholes in the Night: Essential Poems from Latin America (Copper Canyon Press, 2013)

== Awards and honors ==
- 1984: Guggenheim Fellowship
- 1988: Pablo Neruda Award
- 1994: Pericles Gold Award, Italy
- 1995: Municipal Poetry Prize, Santiago, Chile
- 2000: National Literature Prize, Chile
- 2002: Künstlerprogramm Fellow, DAAD, Berlin
- 2006: Casa de las Américas Prize for Poetry, José Lezama Lima, Havana, Cuba
- 2015: Doctor Honoris Causa, University of Alicante, Spain
- 2015: Doctor Honoris Causa, Federico Santa María Technical University, Chile
- 2016: Pablo Neruda Ibero-American Poetry Award
- 2017: José Donoso Ibero-American Prize
- 2018: Asan Memorial World Poetry Prize, Kerala, India
- 2020: Queen Sofía of Spain Ibero-American Prize
- 2023: Sor Juana Inés de la Cruz Honorary Prize, Mexico
- 2023: García Lorca Poetry Prize, Spain
- 2026: Griffin Poetry Prize, Lifetime Recognition
