= Óscar Hahn =

Chilean writer and poet

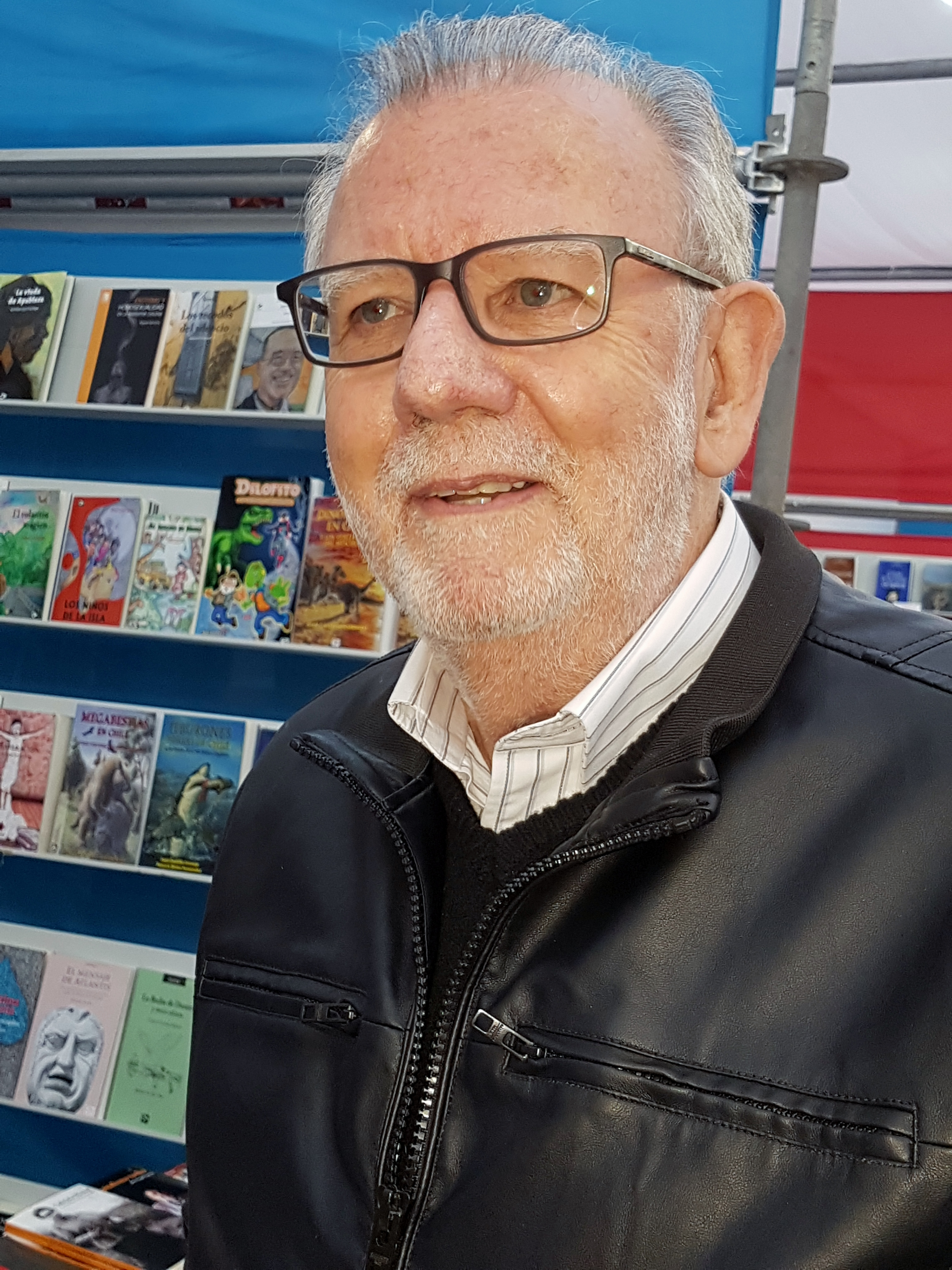
- Hahn in 2017
- Born: Óscar Arturo Hahn Garcés; July 5, 1938 (age 88); Iquique, Chile
- Education: University of Chile (BA); University of Iowa (MA); University of Maryland (PhD)
- Occupations: Writer, poet, educator
- Awards: Pablo Neruda Ibero-American Poetry Award (2011); National Prize for Literature (Chile) (2012)

Óscar Arturo Hahn Garcés (born 5 July 1938) is a Chilean writer and poet, and a member of the literary generation of the 1960s. Hahn has won multiple distinguished awards, notably the National Prize for Literature (Chile) and the Pablo Neruda Ibero-American Poetry Award.

== Early life and education ==
Óscar Arturo Hahn Garcés was born on 5 July 1938, the son of Ralph Hahn Valdés and Enriqueta Garcés Sánchez. His father died when he was four years old.

He began to write poetry during his adolescence in Rancagua, Chile. After falling in love, he felt compelled to write his first poems.

He received his primary and secondary education in Iquique, Chile at the Don Bosco Salesian College and the Lyceum of Men. Hahn later attended the University of Chile.

== Career ==
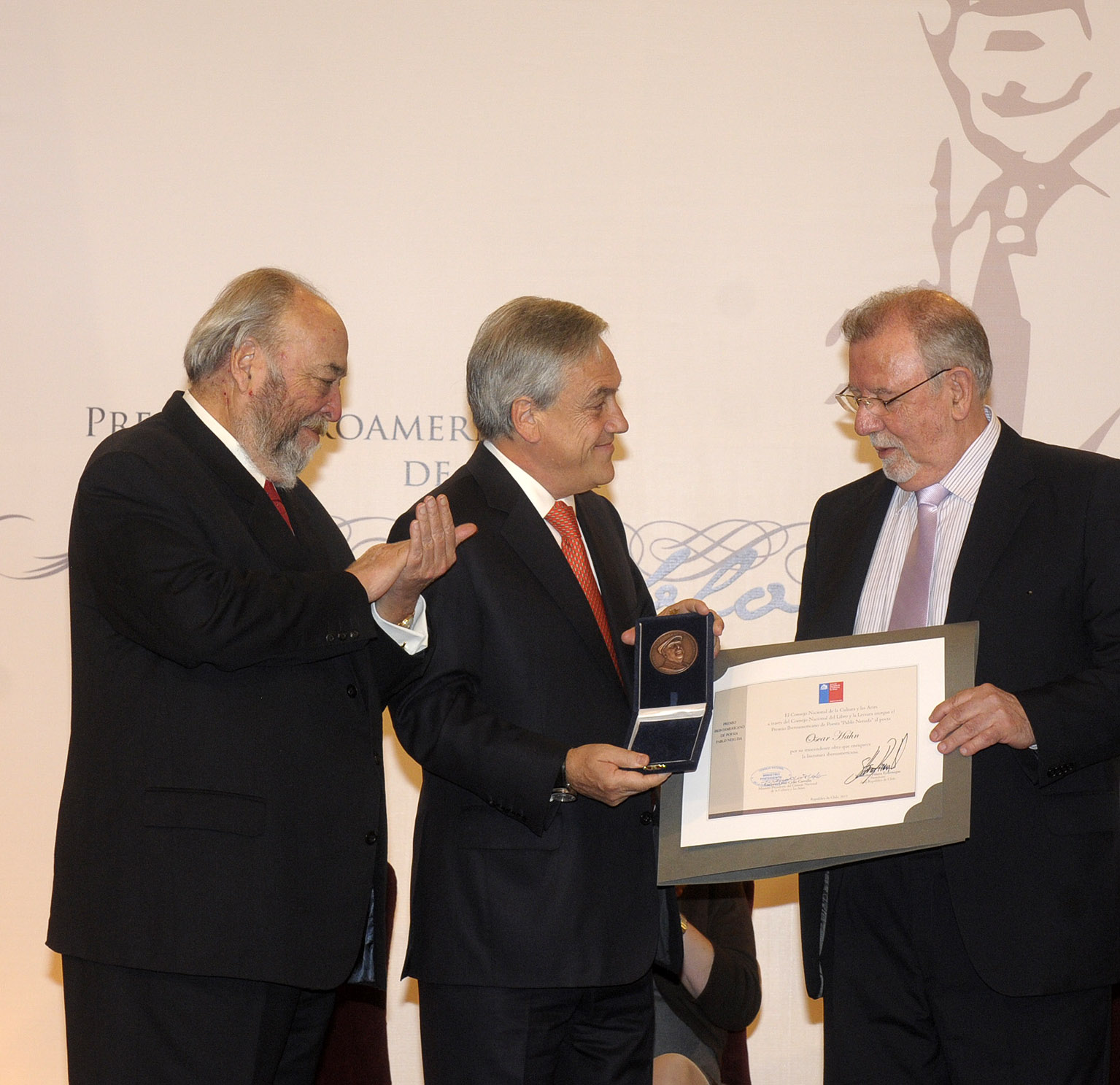
Hahn receiving an award from president Sebastián Piñera

In 1959, while at the University of Chile, he won the Student Federation of Chile's Prize in Poetry. In 1961, at only 22 years old, he won the Society of Chilean Writers' Alerce Prize for the work This Black Rose (Esta Rosa Negra). In 1967 he won the Unique Prize of the First Contest in Northern Poetry of the University of Chile for the (then) regional seat of Antofagasta.

He studied and set himself to the University of Chile's Curriculum in the Teaching of Literature while in residence at Arica. In 1972 he was awarded the degree of Master of Arts by the University of Iowa, US and was named a member of the International Writers' Program there.

In 1972, when he returned to Chile, he took a job as adjunct professor at the University of Chile in Arica. In the next year, 1973, his life would change dramatically, due to political developments in his home country; on September 11 of that year, during the Chilean coup of 1973 he was detained by the U.S.-backed dictatorship of Augusto Pinochet, which had violently overthrown the government of the democratically elected President Salvador Allende. Hahn's book, Love's Disease, was the only poetry book that was banned during the dictatorship.

Later interviewed about his experiences, Hahn remarked: "September 11 is a difficult date for me to forget, not only on account of the things that happened in the country at large but also because they took me prisoner, and they took me as a prisoner the very same night of September 11, which was deadly serious, since in that very moment they were just killing people without even asking them their names, just totally at random. It was a lottery, and I believe that I'm alive thanks to sheer chance, because there were people who were detained with me and they shot them dead; this could just as well happened to me."

Hahn left Chile in 1974 to set down new roots in the United States. He was awarded the degree of Doctor of Philosophy by the University of Maryland College Park, and between 1978 and 1988 he collaborated in the composition of the Handbook of Latin American Studies issued by the Library of Congress, Washington, D.C.

In 1988, Hahn then moved to Iowa City and began teaching at The University of Iowa.

In 2008, Hahn retired from teaching and moved back to Chile to focus more on his poetry.

== Other activities ==
He is a member of the Chilean Academy of Language, and sat on the organizing committee for the Comités del V Congreso Internacional de la Lengua Española (CILE).

== Awards ==
- Premio Poesía de la Federación de Estudiantes de Chile, 1959
- Premio Alerce, 1961
- Premio Único del Primer Certamen Zonal de Poesía Nortina, 1967
- Premio Altazor de Poesía, 2003
- Finalista del Premio Altazor de Poesía, 2004
- Hijo Ilustre de Iquique, 2005
- Consejero Perpetuo de la Casa de los Poetas de Sevilla, 2006
- Premio Casa de América de Poesía Americana, 2006
- Premio Premio de Poesía José Lezama Lima, 2008
- Finalista del Premio Altazor de Poesía, 2009
- Pablo Neruda Ibero-American Poetry Award, 2011
- Premio Altazor de Poesía, 2012
- Premio Nacional de Literatura, 2012
- Premio de Poesía Fundación Loewe, 2014 (Loewe Foundation International Poetry Prize)

== Works ==
- This Black Rose, 1961.
- Poetic Sum, 1965
- Final Water, 1967.
- Art of Dying, 1977.
- The Spanish-American Fantasy Story in the 19th Century, 1978.
- Love's Disease, 1981.
- Nuclear Images, 1983.
- Text on Text, 1984.
- Flower of the Enamored, 1987.
- Stars Fixed on a White Sky, 1988.
- Treaty of Sorceries, 1992.
- Stolen Verses, 1995.
- Virtual Anthology, 1996.
- Retroactive Anthology, 1998.
- The Founders of the Spanish-American Fantasy Tale, 1998.
- Love Poems, 2001.
- Profane Appearances, 2001.
- Selected Works, 2003.
- Without Account, 2005.
- In the Blink of an Eye, 2006.
- Poetic Work, 2006.
- Penalty of Life, 2008.
- Ashes in Love, 2009.
- The First Darkness, 2011.
- The Supreme Loneliness, 2012.
- The Communicating Mirrors, 2015.
