= Carlos Germán Belli =

Peruvian poet (1927–2024)

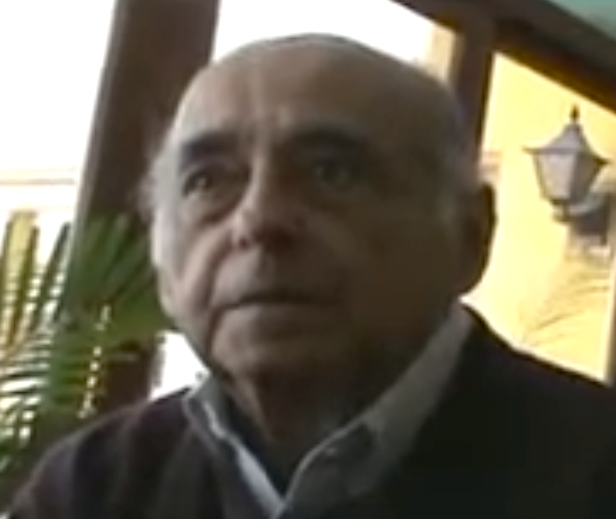
- In a 2011 interview
- Born: Carlos Germán Belli de La Torre; 15 September 1927
- Died: 10 August 2024 (aged 96)
- Occupations: Poet, translator

Carlos Germán Belli de La Torre (15 September 1927 – 10 August 2024) was a Peruvian poet of Italian parentage. He also translated American, French, Italian, and Brazilian poetry into Spanish.

Belli won the Pablo Neruda Ibero-American Poetry Award in 2006, which was granted by Chile's National Council of Culture and the Arts. Belli was nominated for the Nobel Prize in Literature in 2007.

He died on 10 August 2024, at the age of 96.

== Work ==
- Poemas (1958)
- Dentro & fuera (1960)
- Oh Hada Cibernética (1961)
- El pie sobre el cuello. Obra reunida (1967)
- Sextinas y otros poemas (1970)
- En alabanza al bolo alimenticio (1979)
- Boda de pluma y letra (1985)
- Más que señora humana (1986)
- Los talleres del tiempo (1992)
- Salve, spes! (2000)
- En las hospitalarias estrofas (2001)
- La miscelánea íntima (2003)
- El alternado paso de los hados (2006)
- Sextinas villanela y baladas (2007)

=== Work published in anthologies ===
- Ricardo Silva Santisteban (anthologist): Antología general de la traducción en el Perú (General anthology of translation in Peru), volume VI. Lima, Universidad Ricardo Palma - Editorial Universitaria, 2016.
