= Carmen Berenguer =

Chilean poet, artist and reporter (1946–2024)

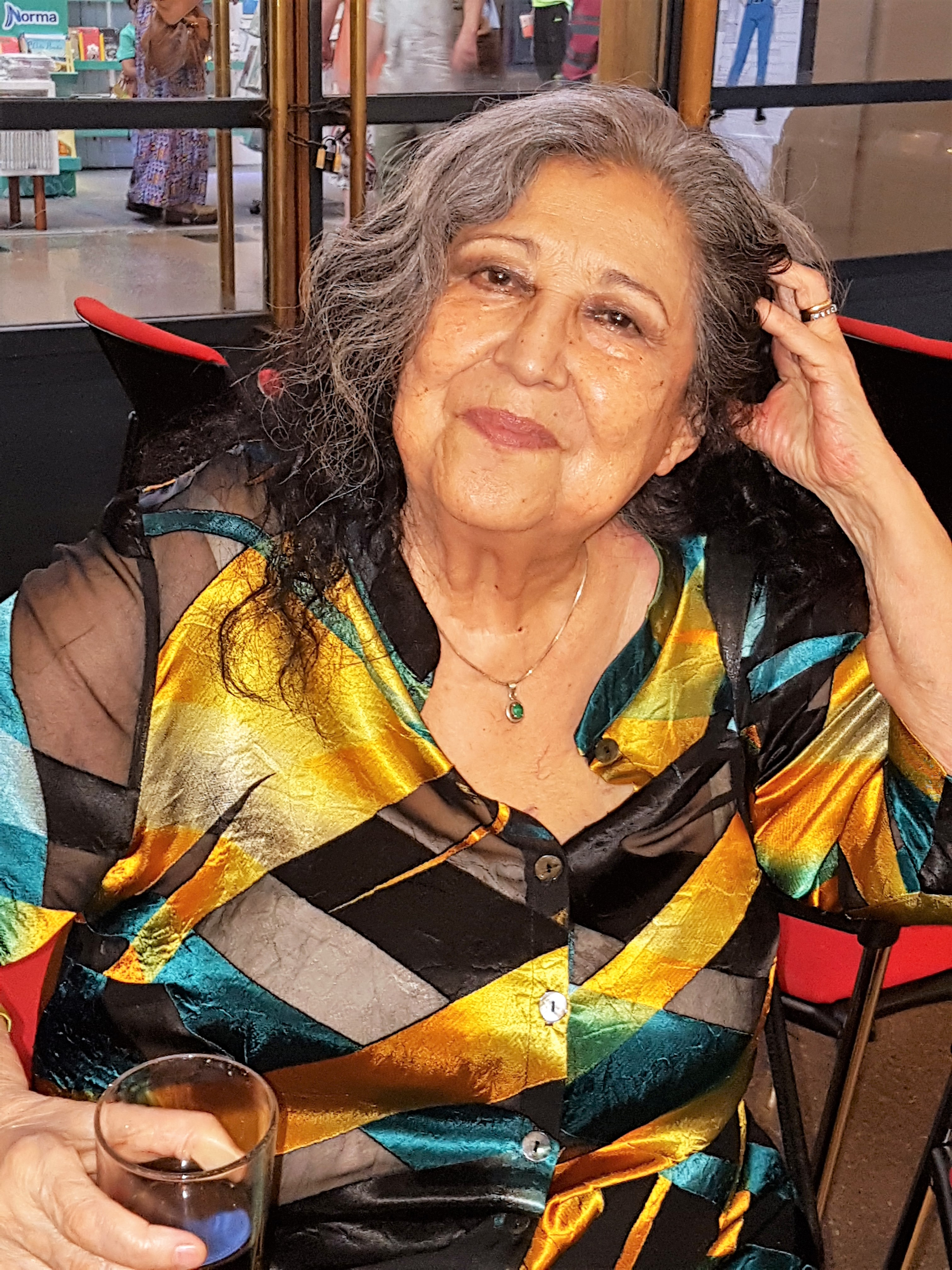
- Berenguer in 2017
- Born: 9 September 1946 Santiago, Chile
- Died: 16 May 2024 (aged 77) Hospital Clínico de la Universidad Católica, Santiago, Chile
- Occupation: Poet, essayist; audio-visual artist; editor; journalist
- Language: Spanish
- Spouse: Carlos Jerez
- Children: 2

Carmen Berenguer (9 September 1946 – 16 May 2024) was a Chilean poet, essayist, audio-visual artist, editor and journalist. Berenguer was the first Chilean awarded the Pablo Neruda Ibero-American Poetry Award.

== Biography ==
Her poetry has been gathered in several anthologies and she was an editor of various publications: Hoja X Ojo, 1984; and Al Margen, 1986.

In 2008, Berenguer became the first Chilean to win the Pablo Neruda Ibero-American Poetry Award.

On 16 May 2024, Berenguer died aged 78 at the Hospital Clínico de la Universidad Católica, Santiago.

== Collaborations ==
- Women's Literature Congress, organizer, Chile, 1987.
- Poetry International Festival with La reconstrucción del tiempo (Time's Reconstruction), organised by Sergio Badilla Castillo and Sun Axelsson, Stockholm, 1989.
- Delito y Traición, documentary, National Congress of Chile, 2003.

== Awards ==
- Pablo Neruda Ibero-American Poetry Award, 2008

== Works ==
- Bobby Sands desfallece en el muro (1983)
- Huellas de siglo (1986)
- A media asta (1988)
- Sayal de pieles (1993)
- Naciste pintada (1999)
- La gran hablada (2002)
- Chiiit, son las ventajas de la escritura, (2008)
- Mama Marx, (2009)
- Maravillas pulgares, (2009)
- Maravillas pulgares, (2012)
- Venid a verme ahora, (2012)
- Mi Lai, (2015)
