= Gloria Gervitz =

Mexican poet and translator (1943–2022)

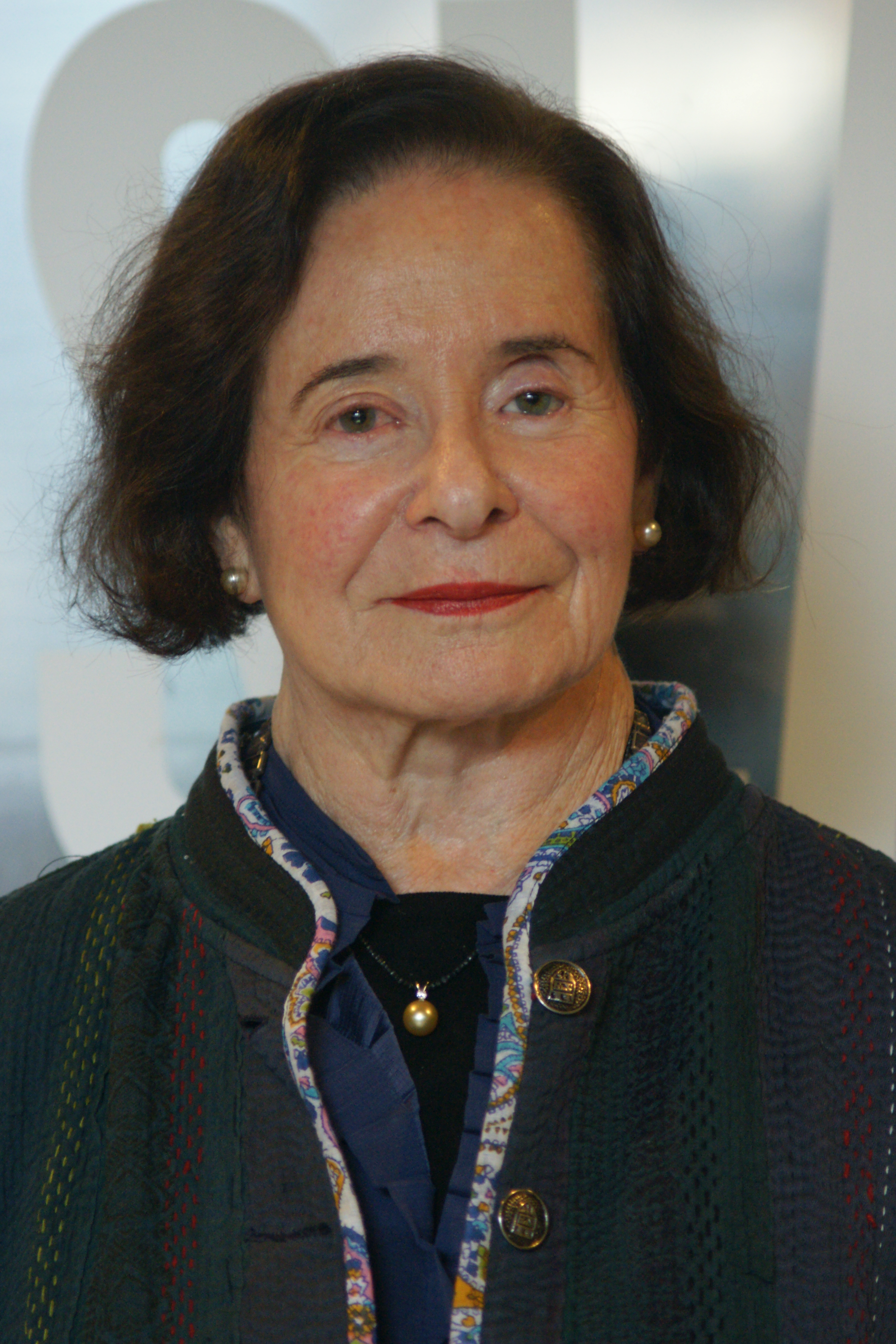
- Gervitz in 2018
- Born: 29 March 1943; Mexico City, Mexico
- Died: 19 April 2022 (aged 79)
- Occupations: Poet, translator
- Writing career
- Notable work: Migraciones
- Notable awards: Neruda Award

Gloria Gervitz (29 March 1943 – 19 April 2022) was a Mexican poet and translator of Ukrainian Jewish descent.

== Biography ==
Gervitz was born in Mexico City on 29 March 1943. Her paternal family arrived to Mexico in 1929, when her father was 9 years old. She studied at the Universidad Iberoamericana. Gervitz resided in the United States.

== Career ==
Gervitz studied Art History at the Universidad Iberoamericana. She has translated works by Kenneth Rexroth, Susan Howe, Lorine Niedecker, Rita Dove, and Samuel Beckett into Spanish.

Between August and September 1976, when she was 33 years old, she began writing an organic poem, Migraciones, which was first published in 1979 and is still in process. Since then, new additions to the poem have appeared in expanded and revised editions. Migraciones is the main work of the poet and it has been compared with other long poems such as Los Cantos by Ezra Pound, Cántico by Jorge Guillén, the Vertical Poetry by Roberto Juarroz or the work by Saint-John Perse. Fragments of the poem have been translated into more than 18 languages. The poem, to date, consists of seven parts and more than 120 written pages; although most of the text is in Spanish, Migraciones contains phrases and words in Yiddish.

== Awards ==
In 2011, she received the PEN Mexico Prize for Literary Excellence. In 2019, Gervitz received the Pablo Neruda Ibero-American Poetry Award, which is awarded by the Ministry of Cultures, Arts and Heritage of Chile. In 2022, she received a posthumous PEN Oakland – Josephine Miles Literary Award for Migrations: Poem, 1976-2020 (NYRB Poets, 2021).

== Works ==
- 1979 - Shajarit
- 1987 - Yizkor
- 1986 - Fragmento de ventana
- 1991 - Migraciones (Shajarit and Yizkor, plus the third part, entitled Leteo)
- 1993 - Migraciones (including the fourth part, Pythia)
- 1996 - Migraciones (including the fifth part, Equinoccio)
- 2000 - Migraciones (including the sixth part, Treno)
- 2003 - Migraciones (including the seventh part, Septiembre).
- 2021 - Migrations: Poem, 1976-2020
