= Soledad Fariña Vicuña =

Chilean poet

Soledad Fariña
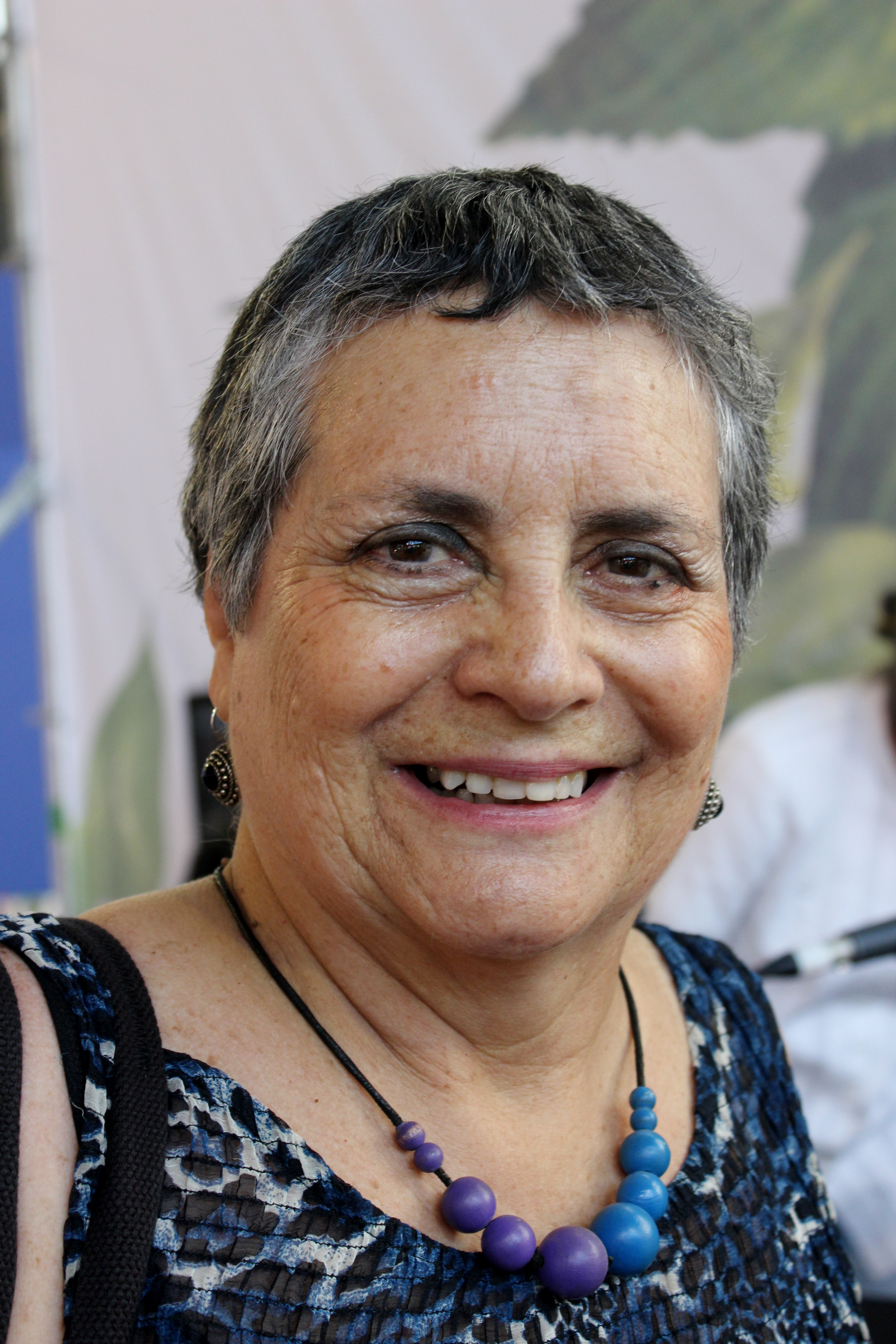
- Soledad Fariña (2018)
- Born: 1943 (age 82–83); Antofagasta, Chile
- Education: University of Chile
- Occupation: poet

Soledad Fariña Vicuña (Antofagasta, 1943) is a Chilean poet.

== Biography ==
She studied Political and Administrative Sciences at the University of Chile, Philosophy and Humanities at the Stockholm University and Religious Sciences and Arabic Culture in the University of Chile. She has a Masters in Literature from the University of Chile.

Her poetic works have been translated to several languages and appear in several anthologies and she has taken part in poetry happenings at various universities and institutions including Catholic University of Chile, Universidad de Los Lagos, USACH, Univ. Diego Portales, Universidad de Concepción; Universidad de Valdivia; Columbia University; The Catholic University of America, Georgetown University; Mount Holyoke College, Smith College; The City University of New York; Universidad Río Piedras, Puerto Rico; New York University (NYU); Casa del Poeta, Ciudad de México; Centro Cultural de España, Buenos Aires; Sociedad de Escritores de Chile en el Encuentro de Poesía Joven de Latinoamérica and Encuentro de poetas del Cono Sur, Coquimbo, among others.

== Works ==
- El primer libro, (First Book) Ed. Amaranto 1985
- Albricias, (Happy Presents/Good grief!) Ediciones Archivo, 1988
- En amarillo oscuro, (In Dark Yellow) Editorial Surada, 1994
- La vocal de la Tierra, (Earthly Vowel) antología poética. Ed. Cuarto Propio 1999
- Otro cuento de ájaros, (Another Tale for Birds) relatos, Ed. Las Dos Fridas, 1999
- Narciso y los árboles, (Narcissus and Trees) Ed. Cuarto Propio, 2001
- Donde comienza el aire, (Where Air Begins) Ed. Cuarto Propio, 2006

== Grants ==
- 1994 Fondo Nacional para la Difusión del Libro y la Lectura
- 1995 Fondo de Desarrollo de las Artes y la Cultura para escribir un libro de poesía
- 2002 Fondo de Desarrollo del Libro y la Lectura
- 2006 Fundación John Simon Guggenheim
- 2006 de Desarrollo del Libro y la Lectura para escribir un libro de poesía
