= Paula Jofré =

Chilean astrophysicist (born 1982)

- Born: 1982 (age 43–44)
- Education: Pontifical Catholic University of Chile; LMU Munich
- Occupations: Astronomer and astrophysicist
- Spouse: Thomas Maedler
- Children: Two

Paula Jofré (born 1982) is a Chilean astronomer and astrophysicist. She was named one of Time Magazine's 100 Next, 2019, for her work with British anthropologist Robert Foley resulting to their collaboration about how "stars birthed in particular parts of the universe could be elementally related because they condense out of the same interstellar clouds" and "pass on their chemistry, much like parents pass along parts of their DNA to their children."

== Biography ==
Paula Jofré was born in 1982 and is the eldest of three daughters of a Chilean father and German mother.

=== Education and work ===
Jofré studied at the Colegio Alemán de Santiago, and Colegio Santa Úrsula de Vitacura, all-girls high school. Her interest in astronomy began with her mother's suggestion for a school project, for which she went to the National Astronomical Observatory (Chile) on Calán Hill and met astronomer José Maza.

From that introduction, her interest in astronomy grew over the years, and she applied and entered the Astronomy degree at the Pontifical Catholic University of Chile, where she graduated and obtained a scholarship to study at the Max Planck Institute for Astrophysics in Germany. She went on to earn her Ph.D. at LMU Munich.

After this, Jofré and her family moved to France, where she entered the University of Bordeaux for a post-doctorate with projects related to the Gaia space mission. She was then accepted as a postdoc at the Institute of Astronomy, at the University of Cambridge. During this period she worked with Gerry Gilmore, and also gained entry to King's College at the University of Cambridge. There, she met Foley and began investigating "star DNA." Her research was described by Grossman.

Stars from the same gas cloud should have almost the same chemistry. That’s similar to how siblings share a lot of the same DNA. The analogy is close enough that Jofré, Foley and their colleagues built a three-branched tree showing the relationships of 21 stars that are siblings of the sun. They described it [in 2017] in the Monthly Notices of the Royal Astronomical Society.

In 2017, she returned to Chile to join the astronomy department of the Diego Portales University in Santiago, Chile, as an assistant professor.

=== Research ===
Jofré's research focuses on the investigation of galactic astronomy, with the main emphasis on the analysis of stellar spectra, to understand the physical processes that shape the Milky Way. She is concerned with the investigation of stars observed with high-resolution spectra, developing, among other things, family trees based on the origin of the matter that makes up stars. With Robert Foley she has studied the chemical spectra of the sun and 21 other local stars, identifying a type of genetic connection among them and have charted family trees.

=== Personal life ===
Jofré is married to astronomer Thomas Maedler; they have two children.

== Selected publications ==
- Jofré, P., & Weiss, A. (2011). The age of the Milky Way halo stars from the Sloan Digital Sky Survey. Astronomy & Astrophysics, 533, A59.
- Jofré, P., Heiter, U., Soubiran, C., Blanco-Cuaresma, S., Worley, C. C., Pancino, E. L. E. N. A., ... & Van Eck, S. (2014). Gaia FGK benchmark stars: Metallicity. Astronomy & Astrophysics, 564, A133.
- Jofré, P., Heiter, U., Soubiran, C., Blanco-Cuaresma, S., Masseron, T., Nordlander, T., ... & Vallenari, A. (2015). Gaia FGK benchmark stars: abundances of α and iron-peak elements. Astronomy & astrophysics, 582, A81.
- Jofré, P., Jorissen, A., Van Eck, S., Izzard, R. G., Masseron, T., Hawkins, K., ... & Manick, R. (2016). Cannibals in the thick disk: the young α-rich stars as evolved blue stragglers. Astronomy & Astrophysics, 595, A60.
- Jofré, P., Heiter, U., & Soubiran, C. (2019). Accuracy and precision of industrial stellar abundances. Annual Review of Astronomy and Astrophysics, 57, 571-616.

== Recognitions ==
- Time magazine as one of the 100 most influential people of the year, 2019.
- Science News magazine as one of the 10 most promising under 40 scientists in the world.
