= Reina María Rodríguez =

Cuban poet

Reina María Rodríguez is a major poet who lives in Cuba whose home has served as a rooftop salon and an intellectual center for the Cuban literary community since 2003.

She has won the Casa de las Américas Prize for poetry, the UNEA Prize, the Julian de Casal prize and the 2014 Pablo Neruda Ibero-American Poetry Award. She was also a finalist for the 2022 Neustadt International Prize for Literature.
