= Hijo de ladrón =

First edition (publ. Nascimento) Cover art by Mauricio Amster

Hijo de ladrón (Spanish: Son of a thief) is a Chilean novel, written by Manuel Rojas. It was first published in 1951.

It was translated by Frank Gaynor and published under the title Born Guilty by Library Publishers in New York in 1955 and by Gollancz in London in 1956. The translation has been described as skilful.
