= Jerónimo de Alcalá =

Spanish physician and writer

Jerónimo de Alcalá Yáñez y Rivera (1571 in Murcia – 1632 in Segovia) was a Spanish physician and writer.

== Life ==
Jerónimo de Alcalá was born in Murcia as son of physician Hernando Yañez and Petronila de Ribera. He studied Latin, fine arts and theology in Segovia, following lectures from Fray Juan de la Cruz. Despite his religious interests, he decided to study medicine in Valencia, following the family tradition. He returned to Segovia to become physician. He married twice and had twelve children. He wrote three books, of which the picaresque novel Alonso, Mozo de muchos amos (Alonso, servant of many masters), later also published as El donado hablador (the indiscrete lay brother) is the most remembered.

== Works ==
- El donado hablador (The indiscrete lay brother), a picaresque novel
- Milagros de nuestra señora de Fuencisla (Miracles of Our Lady of Fuencisla), a chronicle
- Verdades para la vida cristiana, recopiladas de los santos y graves autores (Truths for the Christian lifestyle, annotated from saints and serious authors).
