= Verónica Zondek =

Chilean poet and translator

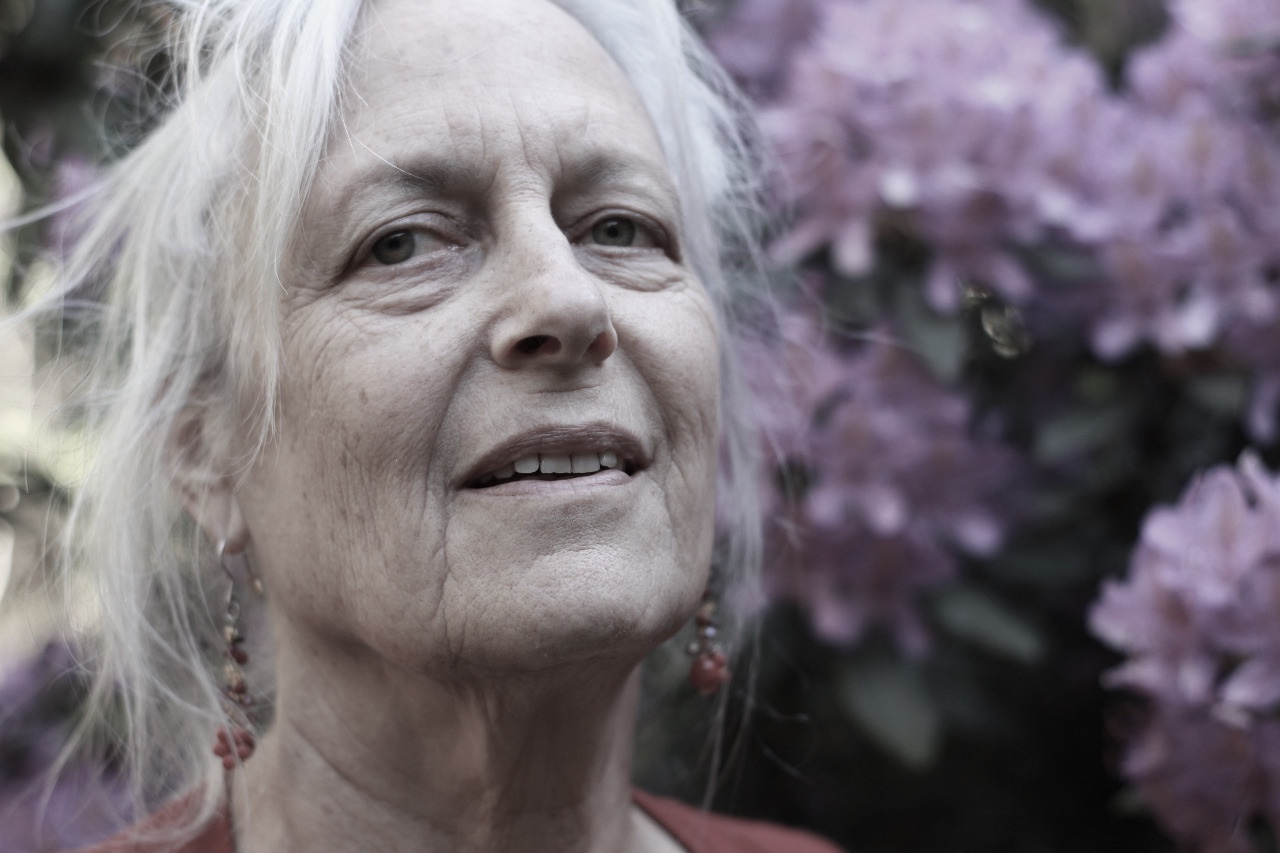
- Born: 1953 (age 72–73); Santiago, Chile
- Education: Hebrew University of Jerusalem
- Occupations: Poet, translator

Verónica Zondek (born 1953) is a Chilean poet and translator.

== Biography ==
Zondek was born in Santiago in 1953 to German, Jewish, and Polish parents. She holds a Bachelor of Arts in art history from the Hebrew University of Jerusalem.

Zondek's first book of poetry, titled Entrecielo y entrelínea, was published in 1984. In 2019, Zondek published an anthology titled Ojo de agua, which included poetry she had written since the 1980s; it was her 14th book.

Zondek's poetry explores themes including place and geography and incorporates social criticism. She writes in various forms including long and short verses, epics, calligrams, and word games. She additionally leads writing workshops. Gonzalo Rojas described her poetry as "necessary".

Zondek has translated the poetry of various authors into the Spanish language, including Derek Walcott and Anne Carson as well as Emily Dickinson and Anne Sexton.

== Recognition ==
In 2017, Zondek received an award for "Poetic Career" from the Pablo Neruda Foundation.

== Selected publications ==
- Entrecielo y entrelínea (1984)
- La sombra tras el muro (1985)
- Vagido (1987)
- El hueso de la memoria (1988)
- Por gracia de hombre (2008)
- La ciudad que habito (2012)
- Ojo de agua (2019)
