= Juan Luis Martínez =

Chilean avant-garde poet, writer, and visual artist

Juan Luis Martínez Holger (7 July 1942 – 29 March 1993) was a Chilean avant-garde poet, writer, and visual artist.
