= Cristián Huneeus =

Chilean essayist and writer

- Born: Cristián Huneeus; 1935; Santiago, Chile
- Died: 1985 (aged 49–50)
- Writing career
- Literary movement: Essayist and writer

Cristián Huneeus (1935–1985) was a Chilean essayist and writer.

== Biography ==
In 1958 Cristián Huneeus began collaborating with articles in the Pomaire magazine. Their journalistic deliveries appeared in different national journals, but mainly in the magazines Cormorán and Mensaje, where he published articles until 1983. Later, from 1977 to 1985, he evolved columnist in Hoy and Cal. Also, he was contributor in newspapers El Mercurio, La Nación, the Tercera and La Razón (Petorca). In this last newspaper he worked since he fixed his residence in the Valley of the Ligua in 1980. After the death of Cristián Huneeus in 1985, his daughter Daniela Huneeus (anthropologist) altogether with Manuel Vicuña (investigator of the Centro Barros Arana) published a book of press articles written by Huneeus between 1969 and 1985.

== Works ==
- "La milagrosa cáscara de plátano". Pomaire. 10: 12–13. 1958.
- "Un óleo hablado de Nemesio Antúnez". Pomaire. 13 (June–July 1958): 8–9.
- Cuentos de cámara (PDF). Santiago: Del Nuevo Extremo. 1960.
- Las dos caras de Jano. Santiago: Editorial Del Pacífico. 1962.
- "Guía Inglesa I". La Nación. 1967.
- "Guía Inglesa III: Multitud en la Estación". La Nación. 13 August 1967.
- "La Guía Inglesa de Cristián Huneeus: IV. El tren". La Nación. 1967.
- "Guía Inglesa V: Poca música" (PDF). La Nación. 27 August 1967.
- "La Guía Inglesa de Cristián Huneeus: VI: Abluciones" (PDF). La Nación. 8 October 1967.
- "La Guía Inglesa de Cristián Huneeus: VII: Old Ladies". La Nación. 15 October 1967.
- "La Guía Inglesa de Cristián Huneeus: VIII: Dios". La Nación. 22 October 1967.
- "La Guía Inglesa de Cristián Huneeus: IX: Humph y Mop". La Nación. 19 November 1967.
- La casa en Algarrobo. Buenos Aires: Sudamericana. 1968.
- "Las parábolas de William Golding". Cormorán. 4: 11–13. December 1969.
- "El rincón de los niños. Huneeus". Manuscritos. 1: 58–69. 3 October 1975.
- "Sobre la publicación de fragmentos". Cal. 3: 18–19. 1979.
- El rincón de los niños (PDF). Santiago: Nascimento. 1980.
- "Enrique Lihn y un malentendido". Hoy. 152: 46. 18 June 1980.
- "Opiniones". Hoy. 159: 50. 6 August 1980.
- "Neruda". La Razón. Petorca: 2. 1 October 1983.
- "La inteligencia de la discreción". Hoy. 351: 40. 11 April 1984.
- "Una novela de campo". La Razón. La Ligua: 2. 8 July 1984.
- "La Tirana". Hoy. 373: 59. 10 September 1984.
- "¿Culpa de Blest Gana?". Hoy. 377: 49. 8 October 1984.
- "Lihn y su libro". Hoy. 382: 54. 12 November 1984.
- "La amistad de Nicanor". Hoy. 384: 48. 26 November 1984.
- "Pertinencia del impertinente". Hoy. 386: 44. 10 December 1984.
- Huneuus, D.; Vicuña, M., eds. (2001). Artículos de prensa (1969–1985). Santiago de Chile: DIBAM: LOM Ediciones. ISBN 956-244-127-X. Prologue by Roberto Merino.
