= Manuel Rojas (author) =

Chilean writer and journalist

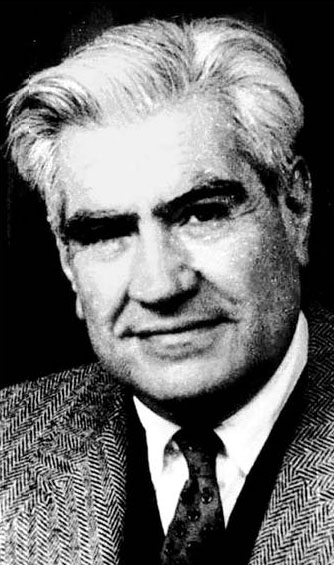
- Rojas in 1957
- Born: Manuel Rojas Sepúlveda; 8 January 1896; Buenos Aires, Argentina
- Died: 11 March 1973 (aged 77); Santiago, Chile
- Awards: National Prize for Literature (1957)

Manuel Rojas Sepúlveda (Spanish pronunciation: [maˈnwel ˈroxas]; 8 January 1896 – 11 March 1973) was a Chilean writer and journalist.

== Biography ==
Rojas was born in the city of Buenos Aires, Argentina, the son of Chilean parents. In 1899 his family returned to Santiago, but in 1903, after his father's death, his mother returned to Buenos Aires, where he attended school until the age of eleven. In 1912, at the age of sixteen, he decided to return alone to Chile. Once he arrived, he got involved with intellectuals and anarchist groups, while working various jobs as an unskilled labourer. He worked as a house painter, electrician, agricultural worker, railroad handyman, loading ships, tailor's apprentice, cobbler, ship guard, and actor in small-time itinerant groups. Many of the situations and characters he encountered there later became part of his fictional world.

He returned to Argentina in 1921, publishing his first poems there. Back in Chile, he worked intensely in his narrative production and, at the same time, worked in the National Library and at the Universidad de Chile press. He married María Baeza and had three children. He joined the Los Tiempos and the Las Ultimas Noticias newspapers as a Linotype operator first and ultimately worked on Santiago newspapers as a journalist, all the while working at the Hipódromo Chile (Santiago racetrack). After the death of his wife, he married again and started to travel. He received the Chilean National Prize for Literature in 1957. He toured Europe, South America and the Middle East. He became a university professor of Chilean and American Literature in the US and at the Universidad de Chile.

His works have, as a central theme, the representation of the instability, misery and marginality of the members of the working class. The development of the psychological and existential complexities of his characters established a difference between his work and prior literary movements (criollismo, mundonovismo), that were characterized by a less complex view of individuality. He died in Santiago on 11 March 1973.

=== Youth ===
He began to contribute to the anarchist journals The Buenos Aires Protest and The Battle of Santiago, where he wrote articles about politics, education, and society (for the 100-year anniversary of the return to Chile, in 2012, Jorge Guerra, the president of the Manuel Rojas Foundation, compiled the texts from the Chilean journals and signed them a few times with his name. He signed others with the pen-name Tremalk Naik, in the anthology A young man at war).

=== Beginnings as a writer ===
His first published literature was a poem, El soneto el gusano (The Sonnet the Worm), that in 1917, appeared in the magazine, Los Diez (The Ten). He belonged to a group four years later, in 1921, and during his time in Mendoza formed a theater company. He published a book of poems under the name, "Poetic" in the magazine, Ideas and figures. The following year, he received his first award with his story, La laguna (The Lake), which won the second prize in the contest for the Buenos Aires magazine, La Montaña (The Mountain). His first book of short stories, Hombres del sur (Men of the South), appeared in 1926. In 1928, the same year his mother died, he was hired as a librarian in the Biblioteca Nacional de Chile (The National Library of Chile). His first wife, Maria, was a professor and poet. The death of his wife would be the inspiration for his poem, Deshecha Rosa (Lost Rose). The following year, his second story book, El delincuente (The offender), came out which contained the famous, El vaso de leche, (The Glass of Milk). His first novel, Lanchas en la bahía (Boats in the Bay), which he wrote in 1930, came out in 1932. In 1936, he published his second novel, La Ciudad de los Césares (The City of the Caesars), and, after the death of his wife, he took over as director of the University of Chile's printing press. Years later, Rojas would declare in an interview his regret for writing this novel, criticizing it for not only being bad, but also extremely fictional. "The writer is the son of his experience. A writer without experience is an unimaginable being", he insisted.

== Works ==
Novels

- Lanchas en la bahía, 1932
- La ciudad de los Césares, 1936
- Hijo de ladrón, 1951
- Mejor que el vino, 1958
- Punta de rieles, 1960
- Sombras contra el muro, 1964
- La oscura vida radiante, 1971

Short Stories

- Hombres del Sur, 1926
- El Delincuente, 1929
- El Bonete Maulino, 1943
- Imágenes de infancia, 1955
- El vaso de leche, 1927

Poems

- Poéticas, 1921
- Tonada del transeúnte, 1927
- Travesía, 1934
- Desecha rosa, 1954

Essays

- De la poesía a la revolución, 1938
- José Joaquin Vallejo, 1942
- Chile:cinco navegantes y un astrónomo, 1956
- Los costumbristas chilenos, 1957
- El árbol siempre verde, 1960
- Antología autobiográfica, 1962
- Esencias del pais chileno, 1963
- Historia Breve de la literatura chilena, 1964
- Pasé por México un dia, 1964
- Manual de literatura chilena, 1964
- Viaje al país de los profetas, 1969
- Justo Arteaga Alemparte, 1974

== Legacy ==
In 2012, Chile's National Council of Culture and the Arts established the Manuel Rojas Ibero-American Narrative Award in his honor.
