= Atenea Award =

- Awarded for: Literature and science books
- Sponsored by: Atenea
- Venue: University of Concepción
- Country: Chile
- First award: 1929

The Atenea Award (Spanish: Premio Atenea) is an honor given by the journal Atenea, published by the University of Concepción, Chile.

The award was given for the first time in 1929, granted annually to the most outstanding book of the year in the literary or scientific field.

The Atenea was discontinued from 1967 to 1994, to be delivered again in 1994 and 1997. Re-launched in 2006, it now alternately rewards literary works and scientific books.

== Recipients ==
, 2018 - 2024

Year	Author	Work	Category	Ref.
1929	Manuel Rojas	El delincuente	Literature	
1930	Eugenio González	Más afuera	Literature	
1930	Alberto Ried	Hiriundo	Literature	
1930	Alberto Romero	La viuda del conventillo	Literature	
1931	Joaquín Edwards Bello	Valparaíso, ciudad del viento	Literature	
1932	Carlos Keller	La eterna crisis chilena	Science	
1932	Luis Durand	Campesinos	Literature	
1933	Alcibíades Santa Cruz	Compendio de botánica	Science	
1933	Ernesto Montenegro	Cuentos de mi tío Ventura	Literature	
1934	Domingo Melfi	Pacífico-Atlántico	Science	
1934	Augusto d'Halmar	For all of his literary work	Literature	
1935	Leonidas Corona	Química norma y patológica de la sangre	Science	
1936	Guillermo Koenenkampf	Geografía santa	Science	
1937	Mariano Latorre	Hombres y zorros	Literature	
1938	Alejandro Vicuña P.	Horacio	Literature	
1938	Sady Zañartu	Lastarria	Literature	
1939	Chela Reyes	Puertos verdes y caminos blancos	Literature	
1939	Argeo Angiolani	Introducción al estudio la química industrial	Science	
1940	Hernán Díaz Arrieta	Don Alberto Blest Gana	Literature	
1940	Benjamín Subercaseaux	Chile o una loca geografía	Special Literature Award	
1941	Daniel de la Vega	La sonrisa con lágrimas	Literature	
1941	Carlos Charlín Correa	Lecciones de clínicas de médica oftalmológica	Science	
1942	Rafael Maluenda	Armiño negro	Special Science Award	
1942	Reinaldo Lomboy	Ranquil	Special Literature Award	
1943	Marta Brunet	Aguas abajo	Literature	
1943	Juan Verdaguer	Desprendimiento retinal	Science	
1943	Alejandro Reyes	El litre	Science	
1944	Óscar Castro	La sombra de las cumbres	Literature	
1945	Luz de Viana	No sirve la luna blanca	Literature	
1945	Raúl Ortega	Manual de puericultura	Science	
1946	Fernando Santiván	El bosque emprende su marcha	Literature	
1947	María Flora Yáñez	Visiones de infancia	Literature	
1947	Luis Meléndez	El unicornio, la paloma y la serpiente	Literature	
1948	Eduardo Barrios	Gran señor y rajadiablos	Literature	
1949	Luis Durand	Frontera	Literature	
1950	Leopoldo Muzzioli	Atropía, nueva magnitud termodinámica	Science	
1950	Benjamín Subercaseaux	Jemmy Button	Literature	
1951	Daniel Belmar	Coirón	Literature	
1951	Antonio Rodríguez Romera	Historia de la pintura en Chile	Special Literature Award	
1952	Emilio Rodríguez Mendoza	La Emancipación y el fraile de la Buena Muerte	Literature	
1952	Avelino León Hurtado	Voluntad y capacidad en los actos jurídicos	Literature	
1953	Luis Oyarzún	El pensamiento de Lastarria	Literature	
1954	Juan Marín	El Egipto de los faraones	Literature	
1954	Roberto Vilches A.	Semántica española	Science	
1955	Fernando Santiván	Memorias de un tolstoyano	Literature	
1956	José Manuel Vergara	Daniel y los leones dorados	Literature	
1957	Efraín Barquero	La compañera	Literature	
1958	Fernando Alegría	Caballo de copas	Literature	
1959	Luis Merino Reyes	Última llama	Literature	
1960	Jorge Millas	Estudio sobre la historia espiritual de occidente	Literature	
1961	Roque Esteban Scarpa	Thomas Mann. Una personalidad en su obra	Literature	
1962	Hernán Larraín Acuña	La génesis del pensamiento de Ortega	Literature	
1962	Hermann Niemeyer	Bioquímica general	Science	
1963	Arturo Aldunate Phillips	Los robots no tiene Dios en el corazón	Literature	
1963	Enrique Lihn	La pieza oscura	Literature	
1963	Alberto Baltra	Teoría económica	Science	
1964	Gonzalo Rojas	Contra la muerte	Literature	
1964	Raúl Silva Castro	Eusebio Lillo	Literature	
1964	Pablo Neruda	Memorial de Isla Negra	Special Literature Award	
1965	Jorge Edwards	El peso de la noche	Literature	
1965	Sergio Correa Bello	El Cautiverio Feliz en la política chilena del Siglo XVII	Literature	
1965	Carlos Ruiz-Fuller	Geología y yacimientos metalíferos en Chile	Science	
1966	Eugenio Pereira Salas	Historia del arte en el Reino de Chile	Literature	
1966	Roberto Donoso-Barros	Reptiles de Chile	Science	
1966	Rodolfo Oroz	La lengua castellana en Chile	Science	
1967–1993	Vacant			
1994	Jorge Edwards	Fantasmas de carne y hueso	Literature	
1995–1996	Vacant			
1997	Clodomiro Marticorena Pairoa; Roberto A. Rodríguez	Flora de Chile	Science	
1998–2005	Vacant			
2006	Guadalupe Santa Cruz	Plasma	Literature	
2007	Jorge Nogales Gaetez; Archibaldo Donoso; Renato Verdugo	Tratado de neurología clínica	Science	
2008	Germán Marín	Basuras de Shangai	Literature	
2010	Vacant			
2012	Tomás Harris	Dunas del deseo	Literature	
2015	Omar Lara	Cuerpo final	Literature	
2016	Gabriel Gatica	A Simple Introduction to the Mixed Finite Element Method. Theory and Applications	Science	
2017	Pilar García (writer)	Mito–Historia, la novela en el cambio de siglo en Chile	Science and Literature	
