= Diego Dublé Urrutia =

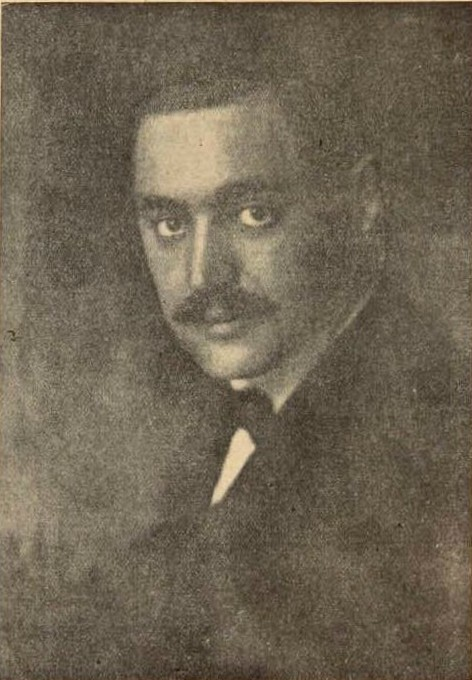
Photo of the Chilean poet, painter and diplomat Diego Dublé Urrutia (1877-1967

Diego Dublé Urrutia (Angol, Región de la Araucanía; 8 July 1877-ibídem, 13 November 1967) was a Chilean poet, painter, and diplomat. He won the Chilean National Prize for Literature in 1958.

== Early life and education ==
He was the son of Teodorinda Urrutia Anguita and Baldomero Dublé Almeida. The latter, an engineer and Lieutenant Colonel in the Chilean Army, died at the Battle of San Juan and Chorrillos, in the War of the Pacific against Bolivia and Peru, on 13 January 1881. His maternal grandfather, Basilio Urrutia, was a military officer.

After attending the Santiago College of Angol, the Conciliar Seminary of Concepción, and other private schools in the Angol area, Dublé Urrutia traveled to Santiago to complete his studies at the National Institute.

In 1895, at 18 years of age, he received an honorable mention in the Varela Contest of Valparaíso, for a poetry manuscript entitled "Pensamientos en la tarde" ("Afternoon Reflections").

In 1897, he took a course for aspiring officers in the Artillery Regiment of Costa de Talcahuano. He later attended the School of Law of the University of Chile, where he contributed to the radical newspapers La Ley de Santiago and El Sur de Concepción under the pseudonym "The Ripper.”

== Career ==
Dublé Urrutia entered the Chilean diplomatic service.

In 1898, he published a collection of poems, Veinte años (Twenty Years), which included the poems that had previously been included in "Pensamientos en la tarde".

In 1903 he published the well-received book Del mar a la montaña (From the Sea to the Mountain), first in Santiago and then in Paris. The poet and activist José Santos Chocano told him, "You are the poet of Chile,” and Rubén Darío, the Nicaraguan poet and founder of the Spanish-American literary movement known as modernismo, wrote him: "Your country has in you the poet it has lacked.” The Chilean writer Hernán Díaz Arrieta, who was known by his pen name, Alone, wrote that From the Sea to the Mountain “consecrated him as a Chilean poet of the first order, admired, celebrated, recited.”

Also in 1903, he was posted on a diplomatic mission to France. This was the first of 17 countries where he was stationed during his career, among them Austria, Italy, and Brazil. In Ecuador he served as Chile's plenipotentiary minister. His professional travels enabled him to meet and befriend many writers and other cultural figures, including Paul Claudel, Georges Bataille, Maurice Maeterlinck, and Anatole France.

In 1917, he was included in an anthology entitled Selva Lirica. At around the same time he helped found Los Diez (The Ten), a group of writers, composers, artists, and architects, the other members of which included Pedro Prado, Manuel Magallanes Moure, Juan Francisco González, Armando Donoso, Alberto García Guerrero, Alberto Ried, Acario Cotapos, Augusto D'halmar, Alfonso Leng, Julio Ortiz de Zárate, Ernesto A. Guzmán, Eduardo Barrios, and Julio Bertrand Vidal.

He wrote about his religious conversion in the book Profesión de fe (Profession of Faith, 1928) and about his family history in the book Memoria genealógica de la familia Dublé (Genealogical Memory of the Dublé Family, 1942). After a long period of silence, he published Fontana candida (1953), a comprehensive compilation of his poetry, including previously uncollected works.

He died on 13 November 1967.

A complete collection of his poetry was published in 1997 under the title Del mar a la montaña.

== Membership ==
He was a member of the Chilean Academy of Language.

== Honors and awards ==
In 1958 he was awarded the National Literature Prize.
