= Óscar Castro Zúñiga =

Chilean writer and poet

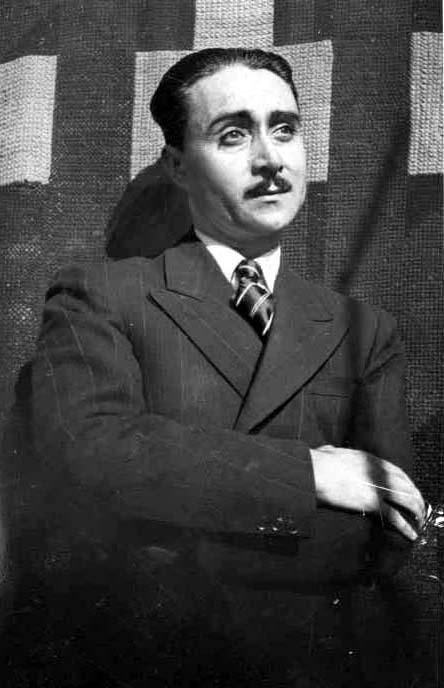
- Castro in 1940
- Born: March 25, 1910; Rancagua, Chile
- Died: November 1, 1947 (aged 37); Santiago, Chile
- Education: Escuela Superior Nº3 de Rancagua; Instituto O'Higgins de Rancagua; Self-Study education
- Occupations: Writer, poet, and librarian
- Movement: Realism and Criollismo
- Spouse: Isolda Pradel
- Partner(s): Estela Sepúlveda (1934-?); Isolda Pradel (Circa 1935-1947)
- Relatives: Baltazar Castro
- Awards: Atenea Award (1944)

Signature
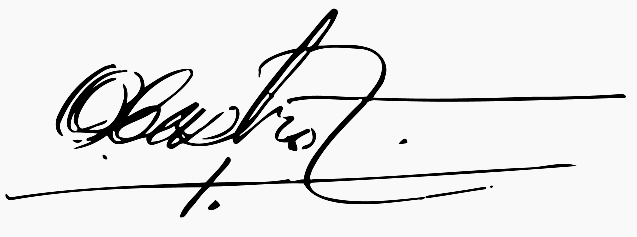

Óscar Castro Zúñiga (March 25, 1910 – November 1, 1947) was a Chilean writer and poet. His literary work covered both the lyrical genre and the narrative genre, much more realistic and closer to the Criollismo movement.

== Youth and studies (1910 – early 1930s) ==
Óscar Castro Zúñiga was born in Rancagua on March 25, 1910, son of Francisco Castro and María Esperanza Zúñiga, being the third of five brothers: Graciela, Javier, Elba, and Irma.

In 1917 he entered as a regular student at Escuela Superior № 3, an important public school in Rancagua, however, he became ill with a convulsive cough and had to temporarily abandon his studies. In 1923, the family, after being abandoned by the father, received the support of Julio Valenzuela, an uncle close to the family, who enrolled Oscar at Instituto O'Higgins, a private school, where he would have stayed for at least one year. For various reasons that are unknown, he did not allow his uncle to continue helping him, becoming a self-taught person. Things became harder for him and his family, due to the Great Depression and a wave of public unrest in Chile. Despite these difficulties, Julio Valenzuela was fundamental in his beginnings as a writer, even financing his first publications.

== Career (1926–1947) ==
=== Beginnings as a poet and writer ===
In 1926 he wrote his first poems that were published in the magazine Don Fausto, a local newspaper, under the pseudonym "Raúl Gris", in tribute to his younger brother. In 1929, he published his first poem under his real name titled Poema a su ausencia appeared in some local newspapers.

In 1934 his brother Javier died. On October 25, 1934, and after the dissolution of the Rancagua Journalists Circle due to several differences among their members after the end of Socialist Republic in Chile, Oscar Castro, some of his friends and a group of important intellectuals including Nicomedes Guzmán and Agustín Zumaeta Basalto, created the literary group " Los Inútiles ". At the same time, he began a relationship with Estela Sepúlveda with whom he would maintain for several years a long sentimental and epistolary relationship that would have remained until his death. In 1935 he joined the newspaper La Tribuna as editor.

At the end of the decade of 1930, he initiated a long-time relationship with actress and writer Ernestina Zúñiga, well known by her pseudonym Isolda Pradel. They would marry later. There are different versions about the circumstances of how they met for the first time and how this relationship was developed, related in some biographies and anthologies about the writer written by Pradel herself and other authors. According to Gonzalo Drago in an interview in 1979, it was he who had presented Pradel, who by 1935 was known as a storyteller and performer and participated in literary activities. Some versions indicate that due to his relationship with Pradel, he was disapproved by his mother, who would have expelled him from the home, facts that were never confirmed by Pradel and people close to the writer and poet. According to different versions, the couple lived difficult hours, being later forgiven by their mother. The relationship between both had different ups and downs, facts that are reflected in their literature.

=== Literary career and nationwide interest after his death ===
His literary career achieved an early nationwide interest in 1936, when he wrote Responso a Federico García Lorca in tribute to the Spanish author killed in the Spanish Civil War. Months later, on June 12, 1937, his mother died. That same year, Editorial Nascimento published his first book of poems, Camino en el alba.

In 1939 he was awarded in Argentina for a series of peasant short stories that were published in some magazines. The same year, Editorial Zig-Zag published his first story book, Huellas en la Tierra. In 1941, by a decree of the Ministry of Education, he was appointed librarian of the Liceo de Hombres de Rancagua - renamed in 1971 as Liceo Óscar Castro Zúñiga thanks to a joined campaign of students and members of the literary group Los Inútiles, connected to the Circle of Journalists of Rancagua, which was founded in 1933. In that public school he also worked as a journalist and teacher of Spanish language. That same year he created a public school for workers, the Escuela Nocturna de Rancagua along with other professors.

In 1942, he was included along with Nicanor Parra and Victoriano Vicario in the anthology Tres Poetas Chilenos edited by Tomás Lago.

In 1945 his daughter Leticia Esmeralda suddenly died due to unknown causes. Months later, he was diagnosed with severe tuberculosis, and was hospitalized for two months. In 1946 he accepted a position at the Liceo Juan Antonio Rios in Santiago, where he began his work on March 8, 1947, and traveled continuously to Rancagua. However, despite the support of his fellow writers, his health was severely impaired and he entered the Hospital del Salvador on September 12, dying in Santiago on November 1, 1947.

Most of his works were not published before his death. At the time of his death, Castro has been constantly mocked and criticized by his critics – especially Hernán Díaz Arrieta and most mainstream columnists of the time – due to his political activism and his rare, "provinciano" and "cheesy" literature. Nevertheless, his unpublished works became known at a time of hard censorship in Chile when in the 1950s, Editorial Zig-Zag and Editorial Nascimiento published all his unpublished works, and, especially, when Ariel Arancibia composed the songs from the LP Homenaje a Óscar Castro (1970), originally recorded by Héctor Duvauchelle and Los Cuatro de Chile, and later by Humberto Duvauchelle (Hector Duvauchelle's brother).

== Style ==
The literature of Óscar Castro is considered to be very particular within the Chilean literature of the 20th century. This starts with a worldview inspired by Federico García Lorca and the traditional songbook, incorporating languages of the Chilean society of the time. It also involves a strong criticism of the inequalities and contrasts of the Chilean society of the time, as well as a lyric of greater and deeper tones, related to the work of Walt Whitman and Luis de Góngora. Despite these contrasts and the evolution of his literature, his work as a unique and personal voice is recognized under his unmistakable stamp, as described in Memoria Chilena: "clarity, transparency, humanism, love and eroticism, social justice and a neat and careful handling of language, of the precise word, of the just adjective ".

At the end of the 1930s, Castro was considered in Chile as one of the representatives of the so-called "poetry of clarity ", a literary tendency partly inspired by the work of the recently deceased Federico García Lorca, and created as a response to the hermeticism and subjectivism of the historical avant - garde. The evolution of Castro's literary work covers two very specific segments and, at first sight, different styles. At first sight, a poetic language, of melancholy nuances, slight, transparent in its language, diaphanous and lyrical in its metaphors, an impeccable metric and a great mastery in the composition of romances, which is clearly seen in books such as Viaje del alba a la noche (1938), endorsed by a prologue by Augusto D'Halmar, or the posthumous glosario gongorino (1948).

On the other hand, his narrative, which in stories like Llampo de Sangre (1950) are more realistic, close to criollismo has been a fundamental influence in the contemporary Chilean literature, a raw vision that in the following decades would serve as a reference and inspire the work of Chilean writers of the late twentieth century and early twenty-first century such as Pedro Lemebel, Hernán Rivera Letelier, Juan Radrigán, Nona Fernández, among others.

== Works ==
=== Poetry ===
- 1937: Camino en el alba
- 1938: Viaje del alba a la noche
- 1944: Reconquista del hombre
- 1948: Glosario gongorino
- 1950: Rocío en el trébol

=== Novels and tales ===
- 1940: Huellas en la tierra
- 1950: Llampo de sangre
- 1945: Comarca del jazmín
- 1951: La vida simplemente
- 1965: Lina y su sombra
- 1967: El valle de la montaña

=== Anthologies ===
- 1939: 8 nuevos poetas chilenos (ed. Sociedad de Escritores de Chile)
- 1942: Tres poetas chilenos (ed. Tomás Lago)
- 1975: Cuentos completos
- 2000: Epistolario íntimo de Óscar Castro (ed. Pedro Pablo Zegers & Thomas Harris)
- 2004: Obra reunida
- 2018: Cartas a Estela (ed. Flavio Vicente Lillo)
- 2019: Para que no me olvides (ed. Universidad de Valparaíso)

=== Reeditions ===
- 2016: Siete veces Lucero + versión original (ed. Claudia Apablaza)

=== Musical works based on Castro Zúñiga ===
- 1970: Homenaje a Óscar Castro Zúñiga: Los Cuatro de Chile, Hector y Humberto Duvauchelle (Music by Ariel Arancibia, Lyrics by Óscar Castro Zúñiga)
