= Zañartu =

Zañartu is a surname. Notable people with the surname include:

- Aníbal Zañartu (1847–1902), Chilean political figure
- Federico Errázuriz Zañartu (1825–1877), Chilean political figure
- Sady Zañartu (1893–1983), Chilean writer

== See also ==
- Guardiamarina Zañartu Airport (IATA: WPU, ICAO: SCGZ), airport serving Puerto Williams in the southern tip of Chile
