= Salvador Reyes =

Salvador Reyes is the name of:

- Salvador Reyes Chávez (born 1998), Mexican footballer
- Salvador Reyes Figueroa (1899–1970), writer
- Salvador Reyes Monteón (1936–2012), Mexican football player
- Salvador Luis Reyes (born 1968), Mexican football player and manager
