= Daniel Vega =

Daniel Vega may refer to:

- Daniel Vega (footballer, born 1981), Argentine football forward
- Daniel Vega (footballer, born 1984), Argentine football assistant manager and goalkeeper
- Dani Vega (born 1997), Spanish football winger

== See also ==
- Daniel de la Vega (1892-1971), Chilean journalist, poet, playwright, chronicler, and novelist
