= Acto de Chacarillas =

1977 youth event in Santiago, Chile commemorating the Battle of La Concepción

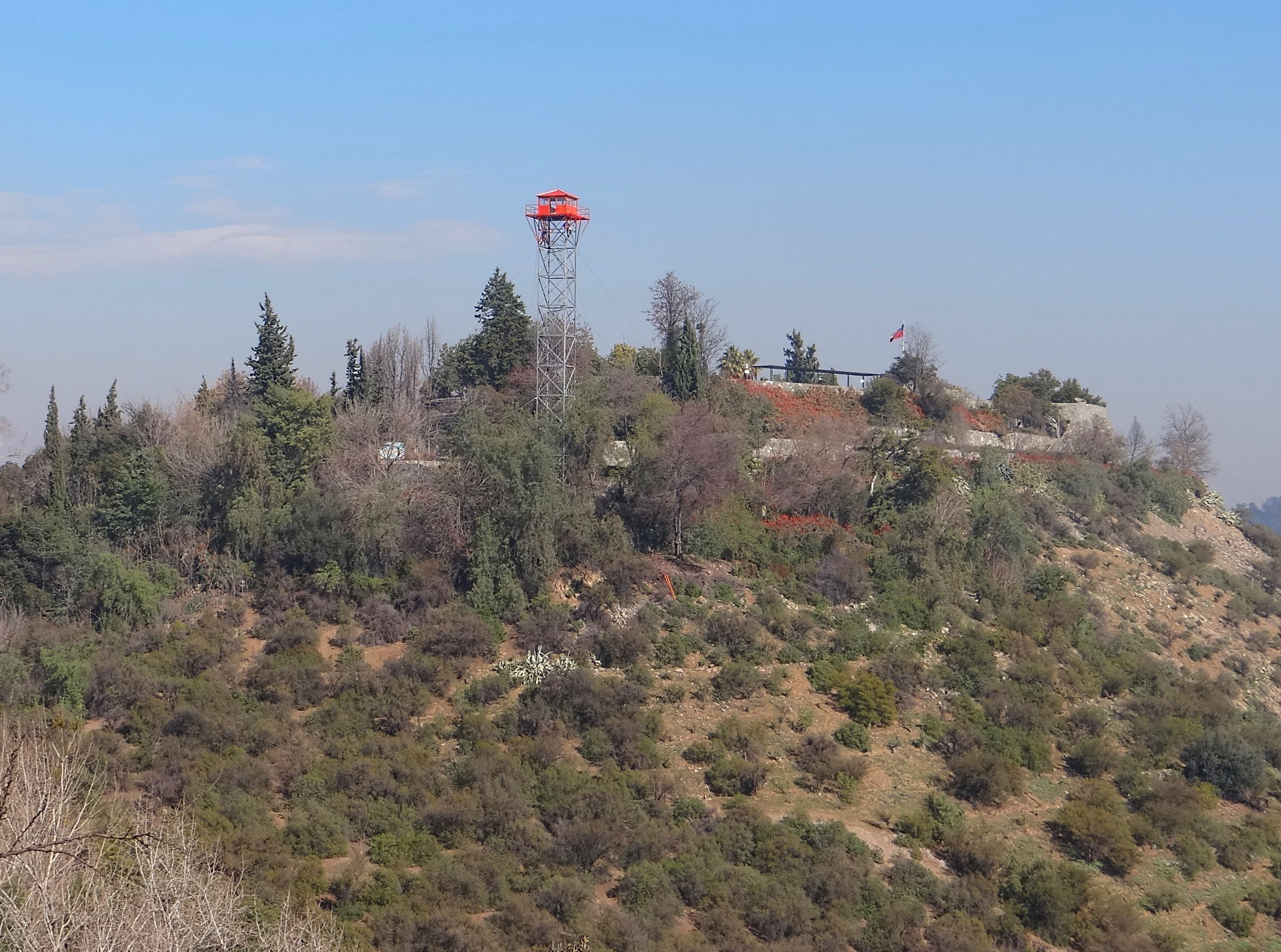
Chacarillas hill

The Acto de Chacarillas was a ceremony performed on the summit of Cerro Chacarillas in Santiago, Chile on 9 July 1977 organized by the military dictatorship of Chile. It was organized by the Frente Juvenil de Unidad Nacional to commemorate its second anniversary and a new anniversary of the Battle of La Concepción.

The event was prepared by Álvaro Puga, who was director of Public Affairs of the General Secretariat of the Government, and by Jaime Guzmán. Guzmán was in charge of writing the speech made by president and dictator Augusto Pinochet. The design and scene of the event was made by Enrique Campos Menéndez (national director of Dirección de Bibliotecas, Archivos y Museos) and Germán Becker Ureta, an advertiser with experience in organising massive shows.

Seventy seven young men and women were invited to the act, the number being chosen to represent the 77 Chilean soldiers that died in the Battle of La Concepción in 1882. Andrés Chadwick, Hans Gildemeister, Cristián Larroulet, Joaquín Lavín and Antonio Vodanovic were among the invitees.

The act was reminiscent of those held in Francoist Spain.

== See also ==
- Francoist influence in Chile
