= Carmela Mackenna =

Chilean pianist and composer (1879–1962)

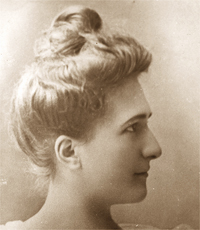
- Born: Carmela Mackenna Subercaseaux; 31 July 1879; Santiago, Chile
- Died: 30 January 1962 (aged 82); Santiago, Chile
- Occupations: Composer; Pianist
- Spouse: Enrique Cuevas

Carmela Mackenna Subercaseaux (31 July 1879 – 30 January 1962) was a Chilean pianist and composer. She was successful as both a pianist and composer in Europe, and is identified with the expressionist and neo-classism style.

== Early and personal life ==
Carmela Mackenna Subercaseaux was born in Santiago on 31 July 1879, to Alberto Mackenna Astorga and Carmela Subercaseaux, and was the youngest of four siblings. Her mother Carmela died after her birth. She was the great-granddaughter of Irish-born military officer Juan Mackenna and the aunt of composer Alfonso Leng. As a child, Mackenna was educated at home, like most Chilean women at the time, and showed an aptitude for creative subjects including music, painting and writing. She studied music theory with Bindo Paoli in Santiago, who saw her talent for music and encouraged her to continue her musical studies. Mackenna received critical acclaim during a piano recital presented by Paoli's students in 1917 and was described in the press as having the "soul of an artist".

Mackenna married diplomat Enrique Cuevas and together they relocated to Germany in 1926, where they lived for the next ten years and was Mackenna's most active period as a composer. The couple eventually separated while abroad.

== Career ==
In Germany, she continued her studies in piano and composition with Conrad Ansorge and Hans Mersmann in Berlin. While there, she was also inspired by Paul Hindemith and the Expressionist movement. The majority of Mackenna's works was published and performed in Europe. However, her Concerto for Piano and Orchestra, which was first played in Berlin on 21 May 1933, was performed in Chile.

Mackenna's Mass for Mixed Chorus a Cappella earned second place in the International Competition of Church Music held in Frankfurt in 1936. The mass was performed by the choir of the Munich Frauenkirche Cathedral in Munich. She also wrote several chamber works including two string quartets in 1940 and 1941, and Visiones chilenas for string quartet with percussion.

== Death ==
After she returned to Santiago from Europe, Mackenna lived a life of isolation. She died there on 30 January 1962, at the age of 82.

== Selected works ==
- Concerto for piano and orchestra (1934)
- Cello and Piano Duo
- Serenade for Flute, Violin, and Piano
- Two Little Pieces for Orchestra
- Suite Chilena (Chilean Suite) for Piano
- Two Poems for Voice and Piano
- Trio for Violin, Viola, and Cello
- Variations and Prelude for solo piano
- Mass for mixed chorus a cappella
- Violin Sonata (includes a piano accompaniment)
