= Palacio Bruna =

Chilean palace

Coordinates: 33°26′14″S 70°38′21″W

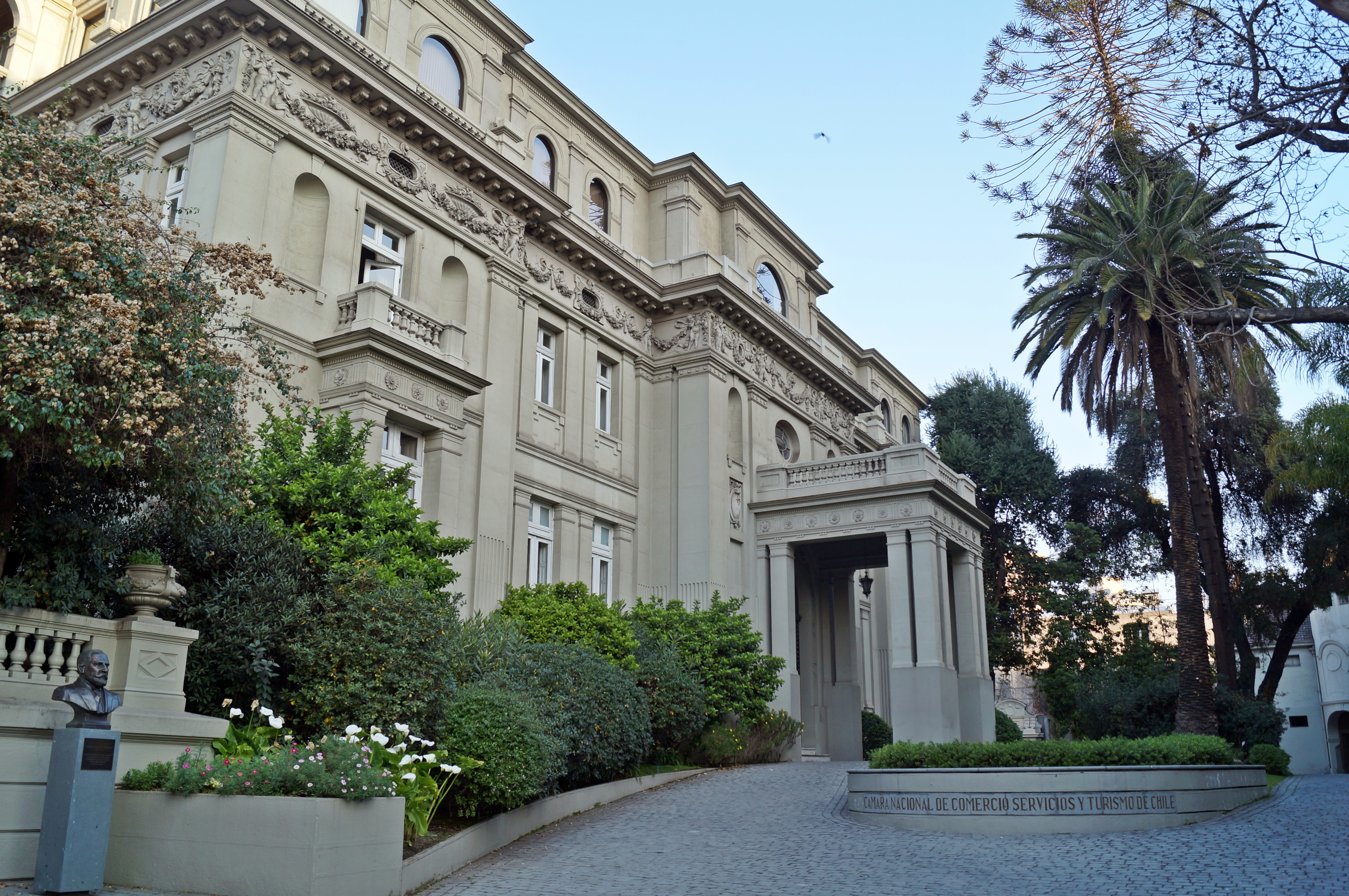
Bruna Palace.

The Palacio Bruna is a palace located on the southern edge of the Parque Forestal in Santiago, Chile. The three-story building has an Italian Renaissance character. It is entirely surrounded by a frieze decorated with garlands and putti, and was constructed between 1916 and 1921 (104 years ago) to serve as the residence for the saltpeter magnate Augusto Bruna. Julio Bertrand, a Chilean architect, was designated as responsible for its design and construction. He died before seeing the palace completed and his friend Pedro Prado took over and completed the building.

The industrial-scale production of synthetic sodium nitrate led to a collapse in saltpeter prices, resulting in the bankruptcy of Bruna's business. Consequently, in 1921, the palace was put up for sale. It was purchased by the U.S. ambassador to Chile, never having been occupied by Augusto Bruna. It served as the American Embassy until 1962 and subsequently functioned as the U.S. consulate in Santiago from 1962 to 1994. Since 1995, the building has been the headquarters of the Chilean National Commerce Chamber.
