= Julio Barrenechea =

Chilean writer, politician, and diplomat

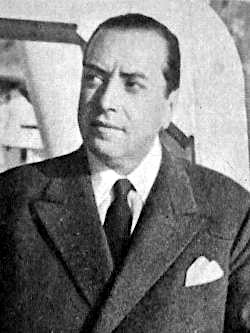
- Julio Barrenechea
- Born: 1910
- Died: 1979 (aged 68–69)
- Occupations: Politician, Diplomat, Writer

Julio Barrenechea (1910–1979) was a Chilean writer, politician, and diplomat. He won the Chilean National Prize for Literature in 1960.

== Works published ==
- " Rally of Butterflies" (El mitin de las mariposas ) (1930),
- " Dream mirror" (Espejo de sueño) (1935)
- " Rumor of the World" (Rumor del mundo) (1942)
- " My City" (Mi ciudad) (1945)
- " Daily dying" (Diario morir) (1954)
- " Collected Poems" (Poesía completa) (1958 )
- " Anthology. Foreword Alone" (Antología. Prólogo de Alone) (1961)
- " Israel: a tree for every dead" (Israel: un árbol por cada muerto) (1962)
- " Fruits of the country" (Frutos del país) (1964)
- " Live ash" (Ceniza viva) (1968)
- " Moods" (Estados de ánimo) (1970)
- " Rendered voice" (Voz rendida) (1975)
- " Poem of Colombia and of being" (Poema de Colombia y del ser) (1977)
- " Compadre my pleasure" (El compadre mucho gusto) (1978)
- " The non mysterious India" (La India no misteriosa) (1982)
- " The sun of India" (El sol de la India) (1986)
