= Samuel Lillo =

Chilean writer (1870–1958)

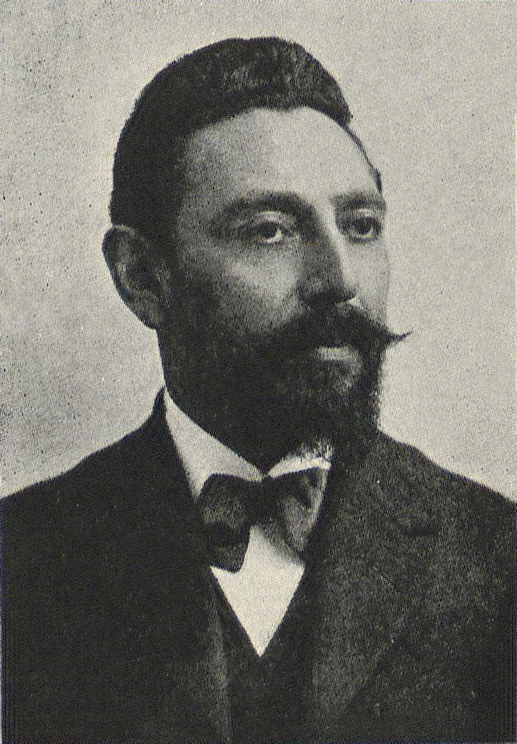
Samuel Lillo (1920)

Samuel Lillo (1870–1958) was a Chilean writer. He won the Chilean National Prize for Literature in 1947.
