= Ernesto Montenegro =

Chilean journalist and writer

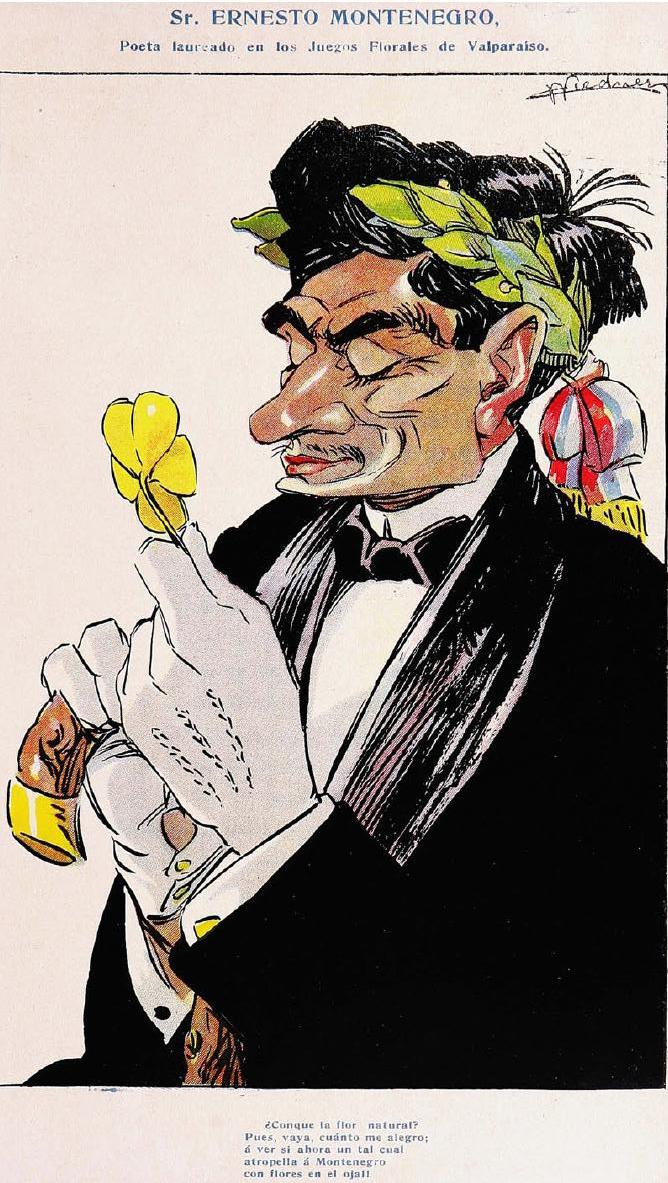
- Caricature of Montenegro winning the 1910 Floral Games
- Born: 1885; El Almendral, San Felipe, Chile
- Died: 17 June 1967 (aged 81–82); Chile
- Occupations: Journalist, writer
- Awards: Atenea Award (1933)

Ernesto Montenegro (1885 – 17 June 1967) was a Chilean journalist and writer associated with the Generation of 1912.

== Career ==
Ernesto Montenegro spent much of his life in the United States, where he served as a journalist and founded a magazine named Chile.

In Chile he founded the first school of journalism (of the University of Chile) in 1952, which he also directed and worked for as a professor.

In his country he worked for the newspaper El Mercurio, and was a chronicler for several international papers, such as El Universal (Venezuela), Excélsior (Mexico), and the New York Times, Herald Tribune, and Christian Science Monitor (United States). In addition, he translated stories by American authors.

== Works ==
- 1933 Cuentos de mi tío Ventura
- 1934 Puritania. Crónicas norteamericanas
- 1935 La novela chilena en medio siglo
- 1937 Algunos escritores modernos de Estados Unidos
- 1951 De descubierta
- 1956 Aspectos del criollismo en América (in conjunction with Ricardo A. Latcham and Manuel Vega)
- 1968 Mis contemporáneos (posthumous)
- 1968 Viento norte, viento sur (posthumous)
- El príncipe jugador
- 1970 Memorias de un desmemoriado (posthumous)

== Awards ==
- Alberdi-Sarmiento Award from the newspaper La Prensa (Argentina)
- Atenea Award (1933)
