= National Prize for Literature (Chile) =

In Chile, the National Prize for Literature (Premio Nacional de Literatura) was created by Law No. 7,368 during the presidency of Juan Antonio Ríos on 9 November 1942. It consists of a lump-sum monetary prize (16 million Chilean pesos, about US$30K) and a lifetime monthly stipend (20 UTM, about US$17K/year). It was originally awarded every year until the amendments introduced by Law No. 17,595 of 1972, when it became biennial. It is regarded as one of the National Prizes in their homeland.

Winners are selected on the overall quality of their works, regardless of genre.

== Winners of the National Prize for Literature ==
- 1942: Augusto d'Halmar
- 1943: Joaquín Edwards Bello
- 1944: Mariano Latorre
- 1945: Pablo Neruda
- 1946: Eduardo Barrios
- 1947: Samuel Lillo
- 1948: Angel Cruchaga
- 1949: Pedro Prado
- 1950: José Santos González Vera
- 1951: Gabriela Mistral
- 1952: Fernando Santiván
- 1953: Daniel de la Vega
- 1954: Víctor Domingo Silva
- 1955: Francisco Antonio Encina
- 1956: Max Jara
- 1957: Manuel Rojas
- 1958: Diego Dublé Urrutia
- 1959: Hernán Díaz Arrieta
- 1960: Julio Barrenechea
- 1961: Marta Brunet
- 1962: Juan Guzmán Cruchaga
- 1963: Benjamín Subercaseaux
- 1964: Francisco Coloane
- 1965: Pablo de Rokha
- 1966: Juvencio Valle
- 1967: Salvador Reyes Figueroa
- 1968: Hernán del Solar
- 1969: Nicanor Parra
- 1970: Carlos Droguett
- 1971: Humberto Díaz Casanueva
- 1972: Edgardo Garrido
- 1974: Sady Zañartu
- 1976: Arturo Aldunate Phillips
- 1978: Rodolfo Oroz
- 1980: Roque Esteban Scarpa
- 1982: Marcela Paz
- 1984: Braulio Arenas
- 1986: Enrique Campos Menéndez
- 1988: Eduardo Anguita
- 1990: José Donoso
- 1992: Gonzalo Rojas
- 1994: Jorge Edwards
- 1996: Miguel Arteche
- 1998: Alfonso Calderón
- 2000: Raúl Zurita
- 2002: Volodia Teitelboim
- 2004: Armando Uribe
- 2006: José Miguel Varas
- 2008: Efraín Barquero
- 2010: Isabel Allende
- 2012: Óscar Hahn
- 2014: Antonio Skármeta
- 2016: Manuel Silva Acevedo
- 2018: Diamela Eltit
- 2020: Elicura Chihuailaf
- 2022: Hernán Rivera Letelier
- 2024: Elvira Hernández
- 2025: Ramón Díaz Eterovic
- 2026: Cynthia Rimsky
