= Manuel Silva Acevedo =

Chilean poet (born 1942)

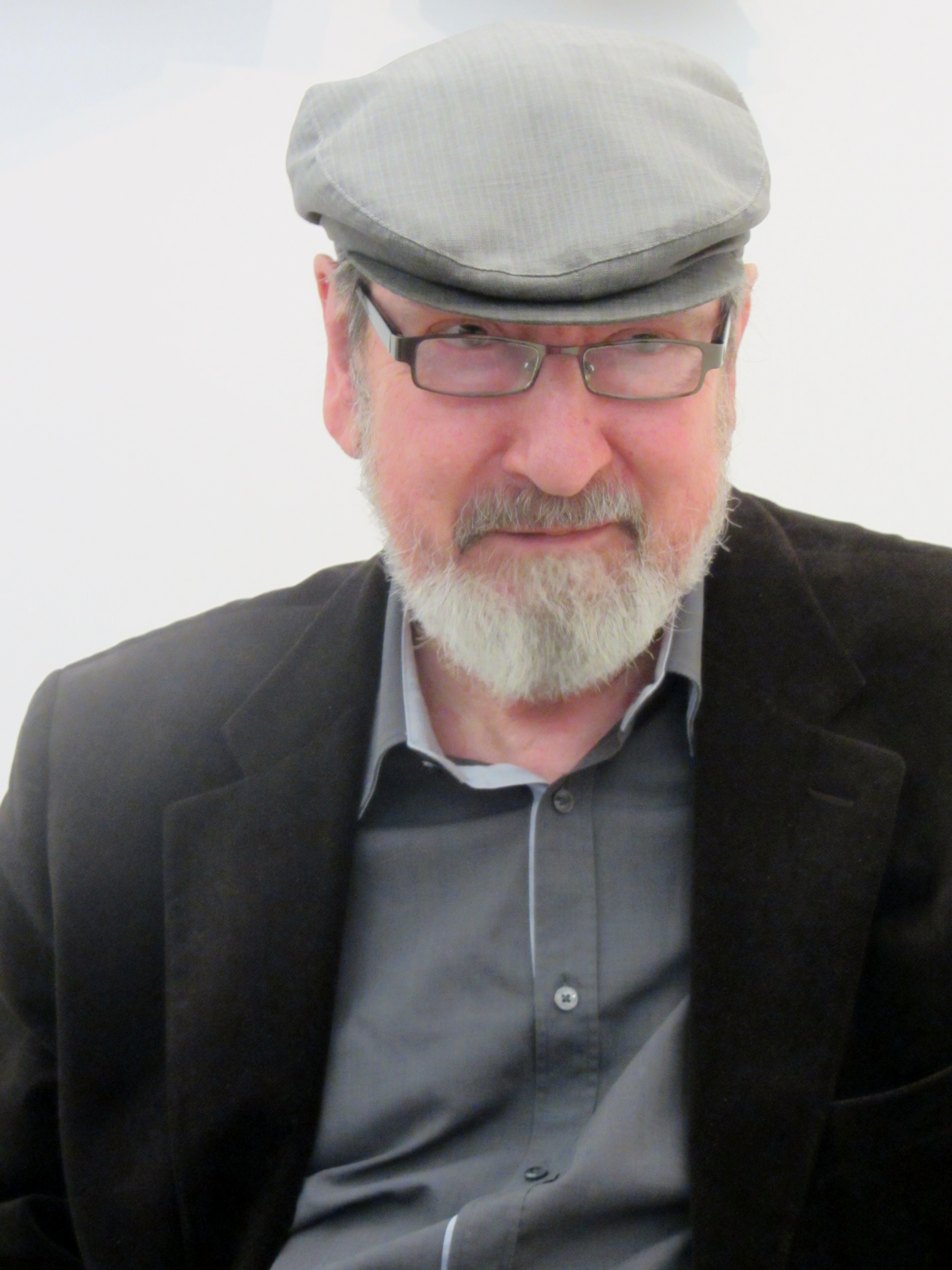
- Manuel Silva Acevedo in 2015
- Born: 1942 (age 83–84); Santiago, Chile
- Education: University of Chile
- Occupation: Poet

Manuel Silva Acevedo (born 1942) is a Chilean poet. He won the National Prize for Literature in 2016.

== Biography ==
A student at the Instituto Nacional in Santiago, Manuel Silva Acevedo attended the Academia de Letras, where he became president in 1959. He read his first poems there in 1957, when he met Antonio Skármeta and Carlos Cerda, who would later become renowned writers. He studied literature and journalism at the University of Chile. He was part of the generation of poets of the 1960s, with his first book, Perturbaciones, published in 1967. During the Popular Unity of President Salvador Allende (1970–1973), he worked at Editora Nacional Quimantú and witnessed the political and social upheaval that led to the military coup of 1973.
