= Alfonso Leng =

Chilean composer (1884–1974)

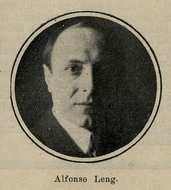
Alfonso Leng

Alfonso Leng Haygus (11 February 1884 – 11 November 1974) was a post-romantic composer of classical music. He was born in Santiago, Chile. He wrote the first important symphonic work in Chilean tradition, La Muerte de Alcino, a symphonic poem inspired by the novel of Pedro Prado. He composed many art songs in different languages and important piano pieces, like the five "Doloras" (1914), which he later orchestrated and are normally played in concerts in Chile and Latin America. He won the National Art Prize in 1957.

Leng was also an accomplished dentist in Santiago. As a dentist, he was the main founder of the dentistry faculty of the University of Chile, and he was eventually elected as the first dean.

Leng was the nephew of composer Carmela Mackenna.
