= Twenty Love Poems and a Song of Despair =

1924 poetry collection by Pablo Neruda

- First edition title page
- Author: Pablo Neruda
- Original title: Veinte poemas de amor y una canción desesperada
- Translator: W. S. Merwin
- Language: Spanish
- Publisher: Editorial Nascimento
- Publication date: 1924
- Publication place: Chile
- English publication date: 1969
- Pages: 100
- OCLC: 4784478
- Original text: Veinte poemas de amor y una canción desesperada at multiple languages Wikisource

Twenty Love Poems and a Song of Despair (Spanish: Veinte poemas de amor y una canción desesperada) is a poetry collection by the Chilean poet Pablo Neruda. Published in June 1924, the book launched Neruda to fame at the young age of 19 and is one of the most renowned literary works of the 20th century in the Spanish language. The book has been translated into many languages; in English, the translation was made by poet W. S. Merwin in 1969.

== Background and composition ==
The book belongs to Neruda's youthful period and is often described as a conscious evolution of his poetic style, breaking away from the dominant modernist molds that characterized his earlier compositions and his first book, Crepusculario. The collection comprises twenty love poems, followed by a final poem titled The Song of Despair. Except for the final poem, the individual poems in the collection are untitled.

Although the poems draw inspiration from Neruda's real-life love experiences as a young man, the book is not solely dedicated to a single lover. The poet skillfully blends the physical characteristics of various women from his youth to create an ethereal representation of the beloved, which does not correspond to any specific person but rather embodies a purely poetic idea of his object of affection. Neruda himself acknowledged that Twenty Love Poems and a Song of Despair deliberately replaced grandiose poetic ambition and lofty eloquence, which sought to encapsulate the mysteries of humanity and the universe, with a new approach.

The vocabulary in the collection is generally simple, belonging to the realm of conventional literary language associated with romanticism and modernism. In terms of meter, two different concepts are present within this work. On one hand, a significant portion of the poems adhere to a regular metric pattern, with the use of the Alexandrine verse being particularly notable. On the other hand, the poet deliberately deviates from this tendency for regularity in certain poems, exercising great freedom in his expression.

Through this book, Neruda achieves an ideal form of communication with the reader while simultaneously maintaining a complex and demanding elaboration that encompasses both the values of the immediate tradition and the new aspects of contemporary poetry emerging at the time of its composition.

== Influence in popular culture and legacy ==
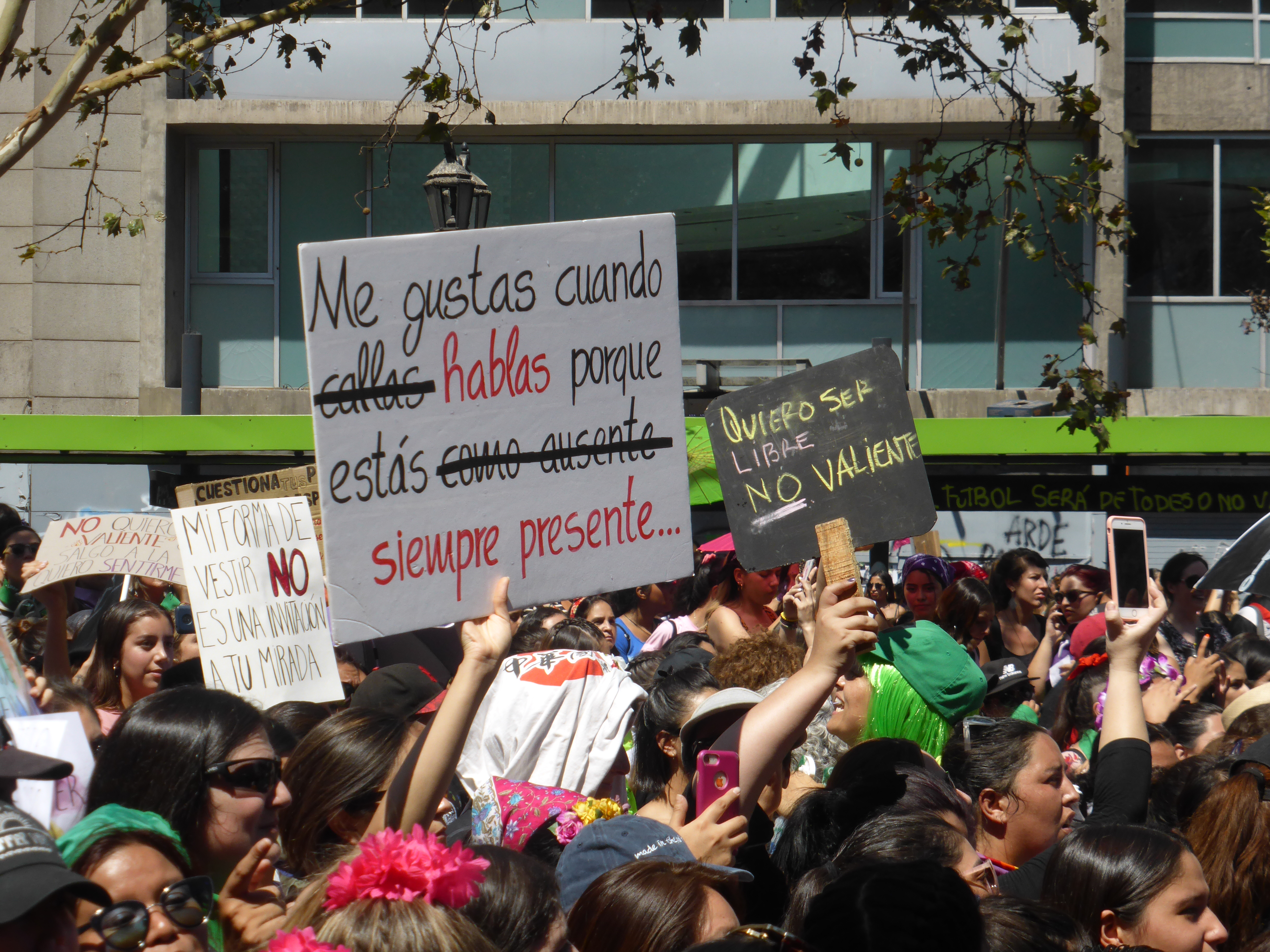
Protest sign in which a poem by Neruda was modified. International Women's Day, March 8, 2020, Santiago, Chile.

Twenty Love Poems and a Song of Despair has served as inspiration for musical works. The Spanish band La Oreja de Van Gogh alludes to the book in their song Canción desesperada, while the Spanish singer-songwriter Álex Ubago reinterprets Neruda's Poem XX. The Mexican rock band Anabantha sets the lyrics of their song to Neruda's Poem XX as well. In 2005, the American group Brazilian Girls recorded the song Me gustas cuando callas, deriving its title from Poem XV. In 2001, the alternative rock musician Lynda Thomas released the flamenco song Ay, Ay, Ay as a single, which was based on this work. Singer-songwriters such as Paco Ibáñez and Joan Manuel Serrat have recited Neruda's Poem XX.

During the feminist march on International Women's Day on March 8, 2020, in Santiago, Chile, one of the protest signs modified Poem XV, changing Me gustas cuando callas porque estás como ausente ("I like you when you're silent because you're as if absent") to Me gustas cuando hablas porque estás siempre presente ("I like you when you speak because you're always present").

This poetry book also serves as the subject of Pablo Larraín's acclaimed feature film, Neruda, starring Gael García Bernal. Additionally, the second album of the renowned Chilean series 31 Minutos is titled 31 canciones de amor y una canción de Guaripolo ("31 Love Songs and a Guaripolo Song"), making reference to the title of Neruda's book.

Twenty Love Poems and a Song of Despair remains Neruda's most well-known work and has sold millions of copies worldwide. It continues to be the best-selling poetry book in the Spanish language, even nearly a century after its initial publication. As of 2020, it is in the public domain in the United States.

== See also ==
- Cape Editions
