= Elicura Chihuailaf =

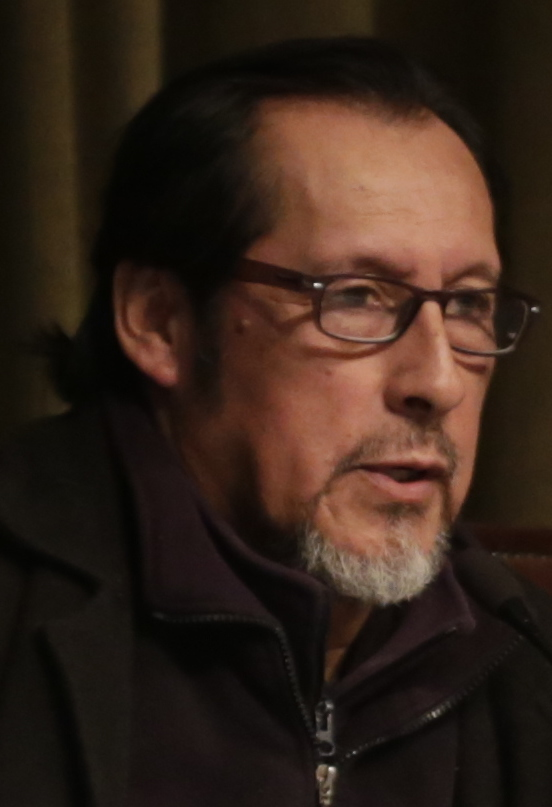
- Chihuailaf seen in 2018
- Born: Elicura Chihuailaf Nahuelpán; February 15, 1952 (age 74)
- Citizenship: Chile
- Education: University of Concepción
- Occupations: Writer and Poet
- Years active: 1977-present
- Awards: Santiago Municipal Literature Award (1997) National Prize for Poetry (2014) National Prize for Literature (2020)

Elicura Chihuailaf Nahuelpán (Spanish pronunciation: [eliˈkuɾa tʃiwajˈlaf nawelˈpan], born in 1952 in Quechurehue, Cautín Province) is a Mapuche Chilean poet and author whose works are written both in Mapudungun and in Spanish, and have been translated into many other languages as well. He has also translated the works of other poets, such as Pablo Neruda, into Mapudungun. He is the recipient of the 2020 National Prize for Literature, the first Mapuche writer to receive this award.

He has been referred to as the lonco, or chieftain, of Mapudungun poetry, and works at recording and preserving the oral tradition of his people. "Elicura" is from the Mapudungun phrase for "transparent stone", "Chihuailaf" means "fog spread on the lake", and "Nahuelpán" is "tiger/cougar".

In his book Recado Confidencial a los Chilenos, he talks about a childhood around the bonfire, in which he learnt the art of conversation ("nvtram") and the advice of the elderly ("gulam"). Similarly, nature with its diversity taught him the cosmic vitality hid from those unwary. This need to express his cultural richness, diverse in itself, made him become an Oralitor, that is, carrier of the oral expression of the Mapuche elderly, this destiny being told by means of "Blue Dreams" (Kallfv Pewma): This will be a singer, you said / giving me the Blue Horse of the Word. In Recado Confidencial a los Chilenos, the poet presents a deeply felt defense of Mother Nature, whom the Mapuche consider threatened by the dominant culture: post-modern capitalism. Considering the current environmental crisis, his message should be listened not only by Chileans but by everybody. The English translation of Recado Confidencial a los Chilenos (Message to Chileans; translated by Celso Cambiazo) is now in print published by Trafford Publishing in 2009.

== Published works ==
- En el pais de la memoria: maputukulpakey (1988) Temucho: Quechurewe [poetry; some of the poems have been translated into Mapundungun]
- El invierno, su imagen, y otros poemas azules (1991) Santiago, Chile: Ediciones Literatura Alternativa [poetry, bilingual edition]
- De sueños azules y contrasueños (1995) Santiago, Chile: Ed. Universitaria [poetry, bilingual edition]
- Sueños de luna azul = Kechurewe Temuko (2008) Santiago, Chile: Cuatro Vientos Editorial [poetry, bilingual edition]
