= Fernando Santiván =

Chilean writer (1886–1973)

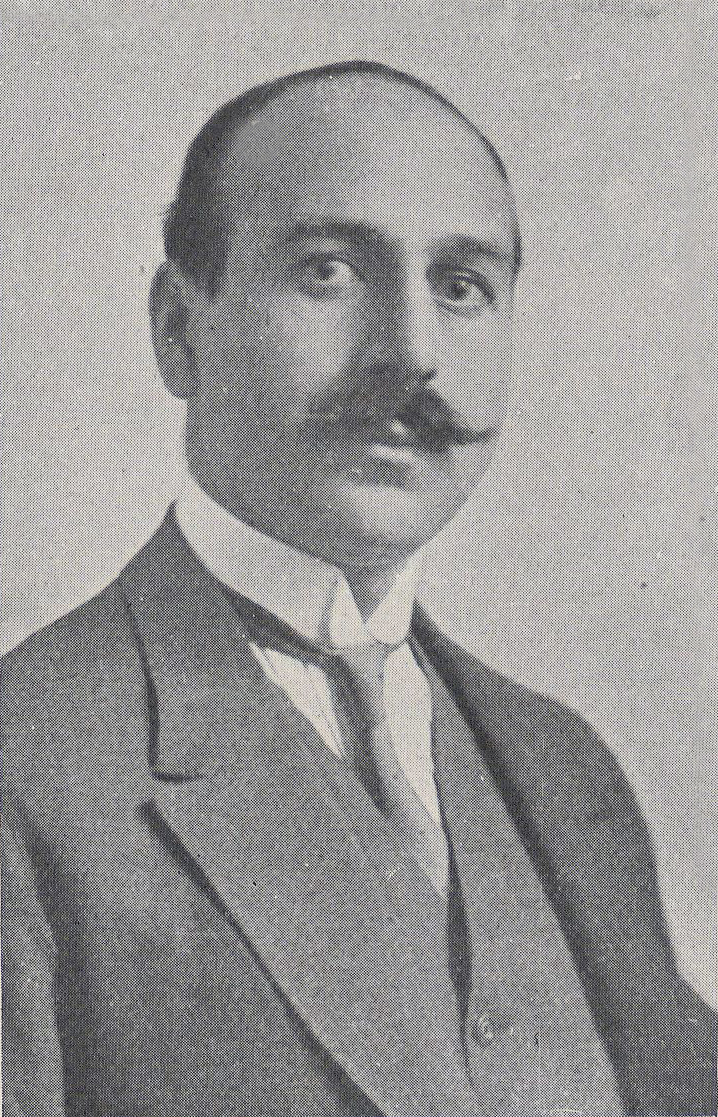
Fernando Santiván

Fernando Santiván (pseudonym of Fernando Antonio Santibañez Puga, 1 July 1886 — 12 July 1973) was a Chilean writer renowned for winning the Chilean National Prize for Literature in 1952.

== Life and career ==
=== Early life ===
Born in Arauco, Santiván was the son of a Spaniard father and Chilean mother. At the age of 8, with the death of his mother, he was sent to the port city of Valparaíso, where he attended several schools. Later, he attended the prestigious "Instituto Nacional" and the School of Arts & Crafts, from which he was expelled for his Tolstoyan anarchist activities. For a short time, he entered the Pedagogic Institute of the Universidad de Chile, studying maths and Castilian Spanish.

=== Anarchist organizing ===
After abandoning university studies, he founded a "Tolstoyan Colony" with writer Augusto d'Halmar and painter Julio Ortiz de Zárate on land gifted from the poet Manuel Magallanes Moure. The colony was founded to practice the ideals of a simple and well-lived life, but was hampered by every-day logistical problems of living in community. The colony befriended fellow anarchist colony of San Cristóbal mountain.

Santiván wanted to work to have his own independence, which led him to take jobs unusual for a future writer; shoemaker, tailor, coal seller, boxer, propagandist, etc. He made shoes alongside Italian anarchist Aquiles Lemire.

=== Writing career and later life ===
With the failure of the colony, he took up residence with d'Halmar in San Bernardo, devising the pseudonym he began writing. He married d'Halmar's sister Elena Gonzalez Thomson having two children, Hilda Santibáñez González (1908-1925) and Felipe Santibáñez González (1912-2004). Later, he married Carcamo Carcamo, with whom he had two more daughters: Iris and Regina.

He gained notoriety with the publication of hist first novel Anisa which won the 1910 Centenary contest.

In 1912 he directed the weekly "Pluma y Lápiz" (Pen & Pencil). In 1914, acting as secretary for the Chilean Writers Society, he organized the Floral Games. The winner was the poet Gabriela Mistral, with her Sonetos de la Muerte.

In 1915 he wrote about art in the magazine Sucesos. In 1917 he directed the Antofagasta Press. In 1918 he founded the successful magazine Artes y Letras. He also directed the Revista del Pacifico and the Correo de Valdiva.

By 1952, he received the Literature National Prize.

Santiván had a stroke in the city of Valdivia, where he died in 1973.

== Bibliography ==
- Palpitaciones de vida (1909)
- Ansia (1910)
- Crisol (1913)
- La Hechizada (1916)
- En la montaña (1917)
- Robles, Blum y Cia. (1923)
- Braceando en la vida (1927)
- Confesiones de Enrique Samaniego: memorias literarias (1933)
- Charca en la selva (1934)
- El mulato Riquelme (1951)
- Memorias de un Tolstoyano (1955)
- Confesiones de Santiván. recuerdos literarios (1958)
- Bárbara (1963)
- Obras completas (1965, with prologue by Ricardo Latcham)
