= Guadalupe Santa Cruz =

- Born: September 29, 1952; Orange, New Jersey, U.S.
- Died: January 25, 2015 (aged 62); Santiago, Chile
- Education: Catholic University of Chile; Université de Liège
- Occupations: Writer, philosopher, visual artist

Guadalupe Santa Cruz (September 29, 1952 – January 25, 2015), also known as Lupe Santa Cruz, was a Chilean writer, philosopher, visual artist and translator. She is considered one of the most energetic and varied protagonists of a generation of writers that emerged after the period of the 1973 Coup d'État in Chile. Author of numerous books, including Plasma, with which she received two important prizes in Chile: the Premio Novela Inédita Consejo Nacional del Libro y la Lectura and the Premio atenea. Also, in 2004, Plasma received the prize of the Book Council as a novel in the unpublished category. In addition, at the international level, she received the John Simon Guggenheim Foundation fellowship in 1998.

== Biography ==
=== Family ===
Guadalupe Santa Cruz was born in 1952 in Orange, New Jersey, a small city in the United States. She was born to immigrant parents; an American mother and Chilean father.

Her mother was a theater actress and her father was a political official of the United Nations.

Her life was affected by the cultural differences of her parents and their constant trips. These started when she was barely a month old, when her parents took her to Mexico, where her family lived for a while.

=== Education ===
Guadalupe studied in Chile, specifically at colegio Jeanne D'Arc, where she finished her elementaries studies (4to Medio). After this, she started her university studies at Universidad Catolica to study philosophy. She studied until she was arrested by the political police of the 1973 coup d'état. So, she was exiled.

=== Exile ===
After the exile, Guadalupe moved to Belgium, a country she previously knew. There, she continued studying, but this time, the engraving career at the Academy of Fine Arts in Liège until 1985, the year which she returned to Chile.

=== Return to Chile ===
After returning to Chile, she held Territoriality workshops with unions and Women's Leadership with women who were social leaders. In her workshops, she focused on two factors: oratory and the construction of speeches.

He worked as a Architecture and Philosophy teacher in various universities. Within them, Universidad de Arte y Ciencias Sociales, Arcis. In addition, she gave La Cátedra Escritor en Residencia at Universidad Católica, where she talked about "the amplitude of the thought and the reflection of the students in the classroom, to enrich the academic work and life of the students and professors of the Facultad de Letras UC, like other faculties of the university.”

=== Feminist dimension ===
Guadalupe was part of the First International Congress of Latin American Feminine Literature (Sp. Primer Congreso Internacional de Literatura Femenina), which started on Monday, August 17, 1987, where topics such as literary criticism, feminist theory, literature and patriarchy, Latin American poetry and narrative, strategies of feminine discourse, meetings of writers from other countries and poetic recitals, were discussed. This congress made the inclusion of women's discourses and writings in the public-intellectual sphere possible. Congress where Guadalupe's work was also considered as: "a need to territorialize writing in a footprint that seeks to recompose the paths of memory." She also collaborated in several publications at Nomadías magazine (Cegecal, Universidad de Chile), as well as participating in several collective publications, such as: Mujeres chilenas: fragmentos de una historia; Pulsiones estéticas: escrituras de mujeres en Chile; Escrituras de la diferencia sexual y Samaritanas, mediadoras y guardianas.

=== Demise ===
Guadalupe died on January 25, 2015, in Santiago, after a long struggle with cancer. After she passed, the posthumous work Esta Parcela was published.

== Reviews ==
The recognized critic of modern Latin American Literature, Julio Ortega, refers to the narrative of Guadalupe Santa Cruz and is distinguished by three aspects.

Primero, por su carácter indagatorio (por su recorrido del deseo, su exploración de la corporeidad vulnerable, su seguimiento del sujeto marginal al programa modernizador urbano). Segundo, por su estrategia narrativa (dramas implícitos, metáforas del malestar del malestar de la conciencia crítica y la sensibilidad ética, voces de registro popular desgarrada). Tercero, por su peculiaridad de su dispositivo formal (relato oblicuo, textualidad generativa, relato fragmentado). Además agrega que «cada novela de Guadalupe Santa Cruz es la metáfora de un flujo anímico que cuaja como su propia demostración, como la traza de una pregunta inquieta por el sentido del lenguaje y el lenguaje de la significación».

Translation:

“First, by its investigative character (by its path of desire, its exploration of vulnerable corporeality, its follow-up of the marginal subject to the urban modernizing program). Second, because of its narrative strategy (implicit dramas, metaphors of the malaise of the discomfort of the critical conscience and the ethical sensitivity, voices of popular record torn). Third, by its peculiarity of its formal device (oblique story, generative textuality, fragmented story). He adds that "each novel of Guadalupe Santa Cruz is the metaphor of a soul flow that curdles as its own demonstration, as the trace of a question restless for the meaning of language and the language of meaning."

== Literary and artistic work ==
- “Salir”, Publishing House Cuarto Propio, 1989.
- “Cita Capital”, Publishing House Cuarto Propio, 1992.
- “El Contagio”, Publishing House Cuarto Propio, 1997.
- “Los conversos”, Edited by LOM, 2001.
- “Plasma”, LOM Editions, 2005.
- “Quebradas. Las cordilleras en andas”, Edited by Francisco Zegers, 2006.
- “Ojo líquido”, Publishing House Palinodia, 2011.
- “Lo que vibra por las superficies”, Publishing House Sangría, 2013.
- “Esta Parcela”, Alquimia Editions, 2015.

=== Art exhibitions ===
- Quebradas book's original prints . Las cordilleras en andas, 6e Biennale de Gravure, Galerie de l’Émulation, Liège, Belgium, 2007.
- “Chile Transversal”, Gallery H10, Valparaíso, 2006.
- Photoengraving book Las cordilleras en andas, 2005.
- “Paysage & Dépaysage” Collective, Académie Royale des Beaux-Arts de Liège, Belgium, 2002.
- Crujía installation (visualization of Los Conversos novel, a cross between literature and printing techniques, hall “Refugio Peruano I”, Santiago; Architecture School, coloquio “Suelo Americano” Nº2, ARCIS, Santiago; Estación Central ticket office, Santiago, 2000–2001.
- Participation in the audiovisual critique collective “La Conexión”, formed by video-artist and writers, Santiago, 1989.
- Engraving Expositions(Liège, Verviers, Bastogne, Tourine-la-grosse, Tournai, Mons, Stavelot), Belgium, 1979 – 1982.

=== Translations ===
- Translation “Sentido y Sinsentido de la rebeldía (Literatura y Psicoanálisis)" by Julia Kristeva, Publishing House Cuarto Propio, 1999.
- Translation of “Las Ciudades de George Simmel” by Francisca Marquez.

== Awards and recognitions ==
=== Grants ===
- Fondart financing, 1996.
- John Simon Guggenheim fellowship, 1998.
- Fondart financing, 1999.
- Consejo Nacional del Libro financing, 2002.
- Fundación Andes financing, 2004.

=== Awards ===
- Premio Novela Inédita Consejo Nacional del Libro y la Lectura, book Plasma, 2004.
- Premio Atenea Universidad de Concepción, book Plasma, 2006.

=== Distinction ===
- Named “Embajadora Cultural” by Municipality of Andacollo, 2006.
