= Eduardo Barrios =

Chilean politician and writer

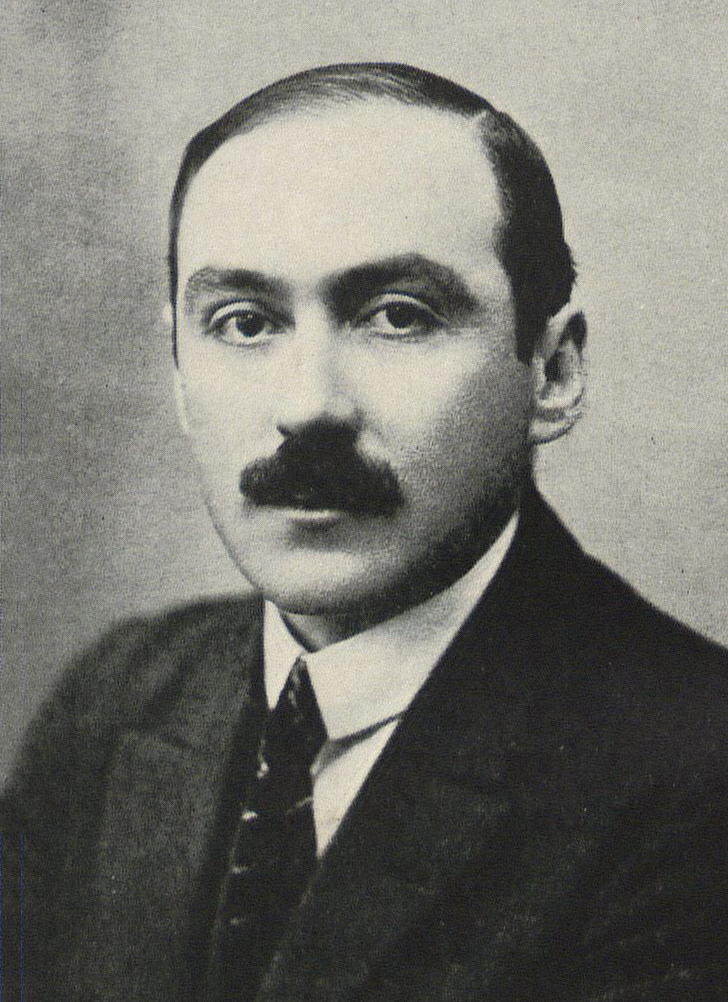
- Eduardo Barrios c. 1920

Minister of Public Education
- In office 14 October 1953 – 5 June 1954
- President: Carlos Ibáñez del Campo
- Preceded by: Oscar Fenner
- Succeeded by: Óscar Herrera Palacios
- In office 17 November 1927 – 17 October 1928
- President: Carlos Ibáñez del Campo
- Preceded by: Office established
- Succeeded by: Pablo Ramírez Rodríguez

Personal details
- Born: 25 October 1884 Valparaíso, Chile
- Died: 13 September 1963 (aged 78) Santiago, Chile
- Spouse(s): Deifilia Passi Barrios; Carmen Rivadeneira Rodríguez
- Children: 5, including Gracia Barrios
- Writing career
- Occupations: Short story writer, playwright, novelist
- Language: Spanish
- Notable awards: National Prize for Literature (1946)

Juan Eduardo Barrios Hudtwalcker (25 October 1884 – 13 September 1963), commonly known as Eduardo Barrios, was a Chilean short story writer, playwright, and novelist. He received the National Prize for Literature in 1946.

Barrios also held public office under President Carlos Ibáñez del Campo, serving as Chilean Minister of Public Education from 1927 to 1928 and again from 1953 to 1954.

== Biography ==
Barrios was the son of Eduardo Barrios Achurra, an officer in the Chilean Army who participated in the Lima campaign during the War of the Pacific, and Isabel Hudtwalcker Journy, a Peruvian of German and French ancestry. His parents married in Lima in 1882. The family settled in Chile after the war, but following his father's early death in 1889, his mother returned with him to the home of his maternal grandparents in the Peruvian capital.

Barrios received his early education in Lima. His school years were marked by difficulties arising from his being the son of a Chilean military officer in the aftermath of the War of the Pacific, and he attended several institutions, including Colegio San Pedro, Instituto Alemán-Inglés, and Sagrados Corazones Recoleta in Lima. During his school years, he befriended brothers Francisco and Ventura García Calderón, sons of former Peruvian president Francisco García Calderón, who had been deported to Chile during the war and whose sons later became prominent writers.

In 1900, Barrios returned to Chile and, under pressure from his paternal grandparents, entered the Bernardo O'Higgins Military Academy. He received a scholarship as the son of a military officer who was a war veteran, but was unable to adapt to military life and left the academy before graduating.

After abandoning his military career, Barrios travelled extensively in search of new experiences and held a variety of occupations. In 1903, he returned to Lima with his mother and took part in a rubber-gathering expedition into the Peruvian jungle, of which he was reportedly one of only two survivors. He also worked as a trader, circus performer, and gold prospector, among other occupations.

Upon returning to Santiago in 1909, he began working at the University of Chile and as a stenographer in the Chamber of Deputies of Chile.

In 1925, he joined the National Library of Chile, where he was soon appointed curator of intellectual property. In 1927, he became Minister of Public Education in the government of Carlos Ibáñez del Campo, serving for slightly less than a year.

Following Ibáñez's fall from power, Barrios became involved in agriculture and land management, first in San José de Maipo and later, from 1937 to 1943, managing the La Marquesa estate between Melipilla and San Antonio, which belonged to the estate of Eliodoro Yáñez. He nevertheless remained active in literature and continued writing for the newspapers El Mercurio and La Nación. In 1953, he was admitted to the Chilean Academy of Language, occupying seat No. 8, and was appointed director of the National Library of Chile, a position he held until his retirement in 1959.

Barrios had five children. His first marriage, to his cousin Deifilia Passi Barrios, daughter of Ricardo Passi García and Isabel Barrios Achurra, produced two sons, Raúl and Roberto Barrios Passi. His second marriage, to pianist Carmen Rivadeneira Rodríguez (born 1887), produced three daughters, including painter Gracia Barrios, recipient of the 2011 National Prize for Plastic Arts. During his final years, he lived in a modest house on Bilbao Avenue in Santiago, surrounded by his children and other relatives.

Barrios died in Santiago on 13 September 1963.

== Literary career ==
Barrios made his literary debut during the first decade of the 20th century, writing short stories and plays. His first collection of stories, Del natural, was published in 1907 and was influenced by Émile Zola and literary naturalism. Contemporary critics objected to what they regarded as the work's excessive emphasis on sexuality and the more controversial aspects of Zola's naturalism.

His play Mercaderes en el templo (1910) received the Theatre Prize in a competition organized by the Consejo Superior de Letras y Artes to commemorate the centenary of Chilean independence. It was followed by the comedies Por el decoro (1913) and Lo que niega la vida (1914).

His literary reputation was firmly established in 1915 with the publication of El niño que enloqueció de amor. Around the same time, he began contributing to the magazines Pluma y Lápiz, Pacífico Magazine, and Zig-Zag, for which he wrote a theatre criticism column. In 1917, he joined the literary group Los Diez.

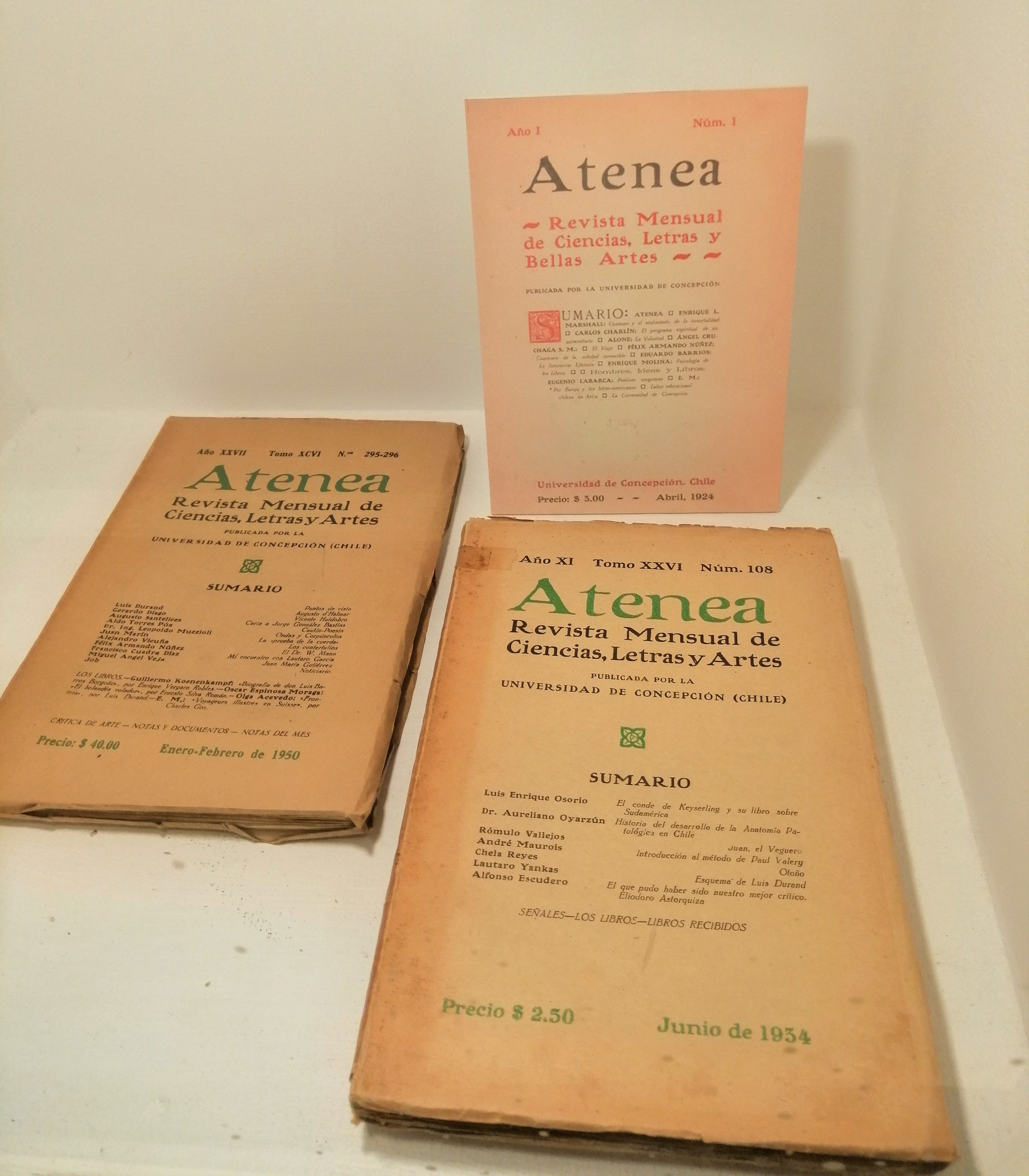
Barrios contributed to the first issue of the magazine Atenea in 1924.

His novel Un perdido appeared in 1918, followed four years later by El hermano asno, regarded as one of his finest works. His subsequent short-story collections achieved comparatively little success until the publication of Gran señor y rajadiablos in 1948. The novel was a major commercial success, being published simultaneously in Chile, Mexico, and Brazil and selling 70,000 copies during its first year. The following year, the novel earned him the Atenea Prize, awarded by the University of Concepción's magazine Atenea.

Barrios was also a prolific literary chronicler. According to American scholar Joel Hancock, Barrios regarded literary criticism as having an important social function and believed that critics had a responsibility to guide readers toward new and worthwhile literature.

Although his works also contain elements of Criollismo, his prose has been characterized primarily as modernist and neo-Romantic by scholar John Walker in Metaphysics and Aesthetics in the Works of Eduardo Barrios. Chilean critic Hernán Díaz Arrieta, known as Alone, praised the beauty of Barrios's prose while regarding his powers of invention and characterization as comparatively weaker.

In 1962, Editorial Zig-Zag published his Obras completas in two volumes, excluding his three plays: Mercaderes en el templo, Por el decoro, and Vivir.

Barrios maintained a lengthy correspondence with poet Gabriela Mistral, recipient of the Nobel Prize in Literature, who admired his prose and wrote the prologue to Y la vida sigue. Much of their correspondence was published in 1988 by the Centro de Estudios de Literatura Chilena of the Pontifical Catholic University of Chile.

== Works ==
- Del natural, short stories, Imprenta Rafael Bini e Hijos, Iquique, 1907
- Mercaderes en el templo, four-act play, 1910
- Por el decoro, one-act comedy, 1913
- Lo que niega la vida, three-act comedy, 1914
- El niño que enloqueció de amor, novella and short stories, Heraclio Fernández, Santiago, 1915
- Vivir, play, 1916
- Un perdido, novel, Editorial Chilena, Santiago, 1918
- El hermano asno, novel, Nascimento, Santiago, 1922
- Páginas de un pobre diablo, short stories, Nascimento, Santiago, 1923
- Y la vida sigue..., with a prologue by Gabriela Mistral, Tor, Buenos Aires, 1925
- Tamarugal, short stories, 1944
- Gran señor y rajadiablos, novel, 1948
- Los hombres del hombre, novel, 1950
- Obras completas, 2 volumes, Editorial Zig-Zag, Santiago, 1962
- Epistolario de Gabriela Mistral y Eduardo Barrios, Centro de Estudios de Literatura Chilena, Instituto de Letras, Pontifical Catholic University of Chile, 1988
- Crónicas literarias de Eduardo Barrios, prologue and selection by Joel Hancock, Ediciones Universitarias de Valparaíso, 2004

== Awards and honours ==
- Theatre Prize (1910), awarded by the Consejo Superior de Letras y Artes for Mercaderes en el templo
- National Prize for Literature (1946)
- Atenea Prize (1949), for Gran señor y rajadiablos

== Bibliography ==
- Gispert, Carlos (2000). Enciclopedia de Chile, Diccionario (in Spanish). Vol. 1. Santiago: Editorial Océano. ISBN 84-494-2336-8.
