= Salvador Reyes Figueroa =

Chilean writer

- National Literature Prize 1967
- Born: August 16, 1899; Copiapó, Chile
- Died: February 27, 1970 (aged 70); Santiago, Chile
- Occupation: Writer, poet, essayist
- Literary movement: Imaginism

Salvador Reyes Figueroa was a Chilean writer who won the 1967 Chilean National Prize for Literature.

== Biography ==
He was born in Copiapó to Arturo Reyes and Luisa Figueroa on August 16, 1899. He first studied at the Instituto Comercial de Antofagasta (Antofagasta Commercial College).

He travelled to North Chile, then lived in Valparaíso. By the end of 1920, he moved to Santiago, where he began working as a journalist. He wrote for Zig-Zag, Las Últimas Noticias, and Hoy under the nickname "Simbad".

In 1928 he co-founded the magazine Letras along with Ángel Cruchaga Santa María, Manuel Eduardo Hübner, Luis Enrique Délano and Hernán del Solar. According to some researches, this publication would gather the best writers of its time together.

In 1939, President Pedro Aguirre Cerda anointed him as consul in Paris. Eventually he also had high diplomatic positions in Barcelona, London, Rome, Haiti and Athens.

Reyes was member of the Chilean Academy of Language between 1960 and 1970.

He obtained the National Literature Prize in 1967. He died in Santiago, on February 27, 1970. His ashes were cast to the sea in front of Antofagasta.

== Postmortem recognition ==
Between 1990 and 1999, his collection was displayed in the Wulff Castle, in Viña del Mar.

== Works ==
The following is a list of his works in their original title (in Spanish), kind and year of publication.

- Barco ebrio, Poetry, 1923.
- El último pirata, Stories, 1925.
- El matador de tiburones, Novel, 1926.
- El café del puerto, Novel, 1927.
- Los tripulantes de la noche, Tales, 1929.
- Las mareas del sur, Poetry, 1930.
- Lo que el tiempo deja, Tales, 1932.
- Tres novelas de la costa, Novel, 1934.
- Ruta de sangre, Novel, 1935.
- Piel nocturna, Novel, 1936.
- Norte y sur, Short Novels, 1947.
- Mónica Sanders, Novel, 1951.
- Valparaíso, puerto de nostalgias, Novel, 1955.
- El continente de los hombres solos, Chronicles, 1956.
- Rostros sin máscaras, Interviews, 1957.
- Los amantes desunidos, Novel, 1959.
- Los defraudados, Tales, 1963.
- El incendio del astillero, Tales, 1964.
- Andanzas por el desierto de Atacama, Chronicles, 1966.
- Fuego en la frontera, Essay, 1968.
- La redención de las sirenas, Theater, 1968.
- Crónicas de Oriente, Chronicles, 1973.
