= Edgardo Garrido =

Chilean writer (1888–1976)

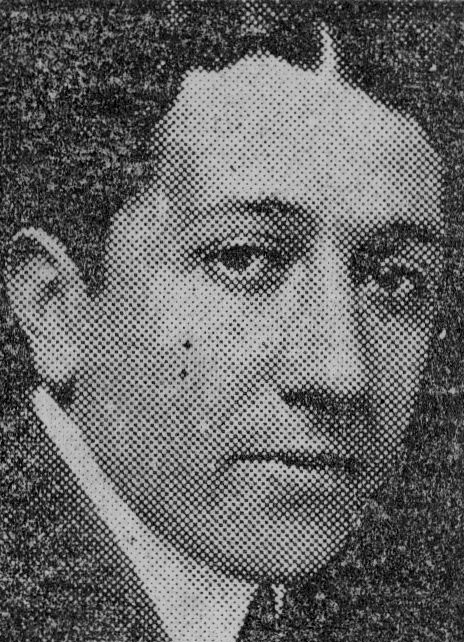
Edgardo Garrido in 1935

Edgardo Garrido (1888–1976) was a Chilean writer and diplomat. He won the Chilean National Prize for Literature in 1972.
