= Editorial Nascimento =

- Status: Defunct
- Founded: 1917
- Founder: Carlos George-Nascimento
- Defunct: 1986
- Country of origin: Chile

Editorial Nascimento was a Chilean bookstore and publishing house. It began operating as a bookstore in 1873 and was founded as a publishing house in 1917 by Carlos George-Nascimento and was the first publishing house to publish the first two Nobel Prize winners in literature in Latin America (Gabriela Mistral and Pablo Neruda). In 1924 it published the book Veinte poemas de amor y una canción desesperada de Neruda, which to this day remains the best-selling book of poetry in the Spanish language, just under a century after its first edition.

When George-Nascimento died in February 1966, his publishing house had published 35 of the 37 National Literature Prizes awarded up to that point in Chile, making it one of the most important publishing houses in the history of the Latin American continent. The newspaper El Mercurio called him "Anonymous Hero of the 20th Century". The publishing house ceased operations in 1986 due to the introduction of VAT on books and other factors that affected the company's profitability.

== History ==
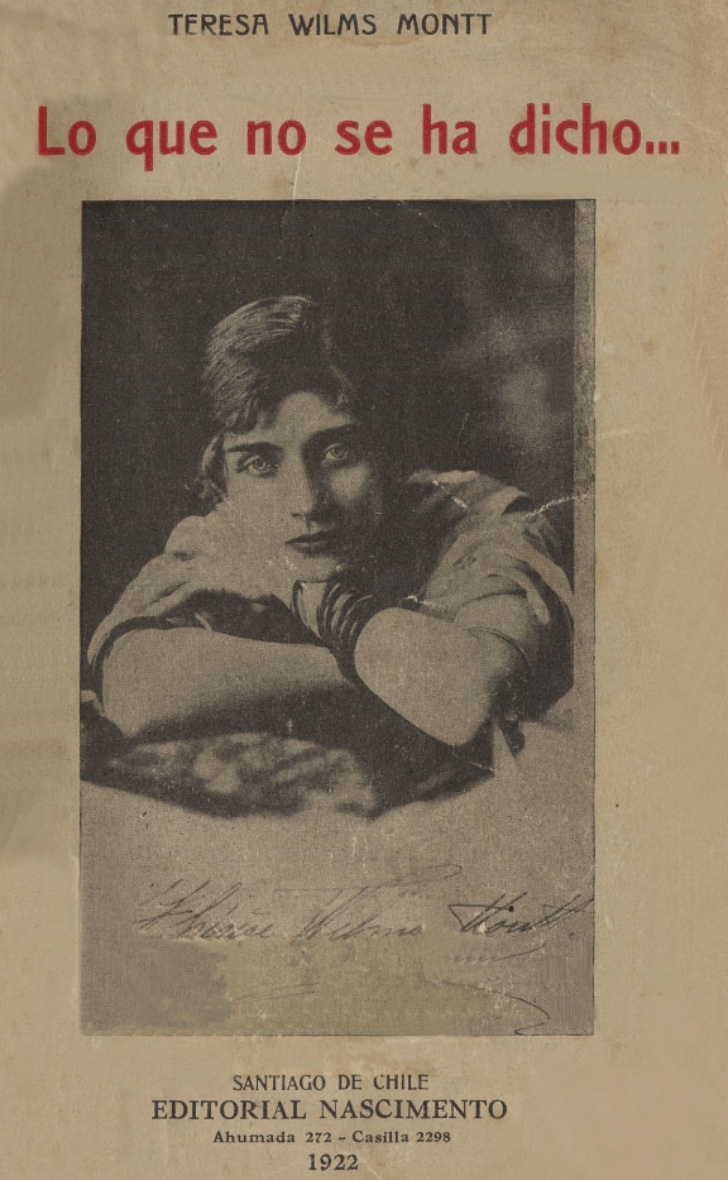
Teresa Wilms Montt's book "What has not been said..." published by Editorial Nascimento (1922).

Book of poems by Eusebio Lillo (1923).

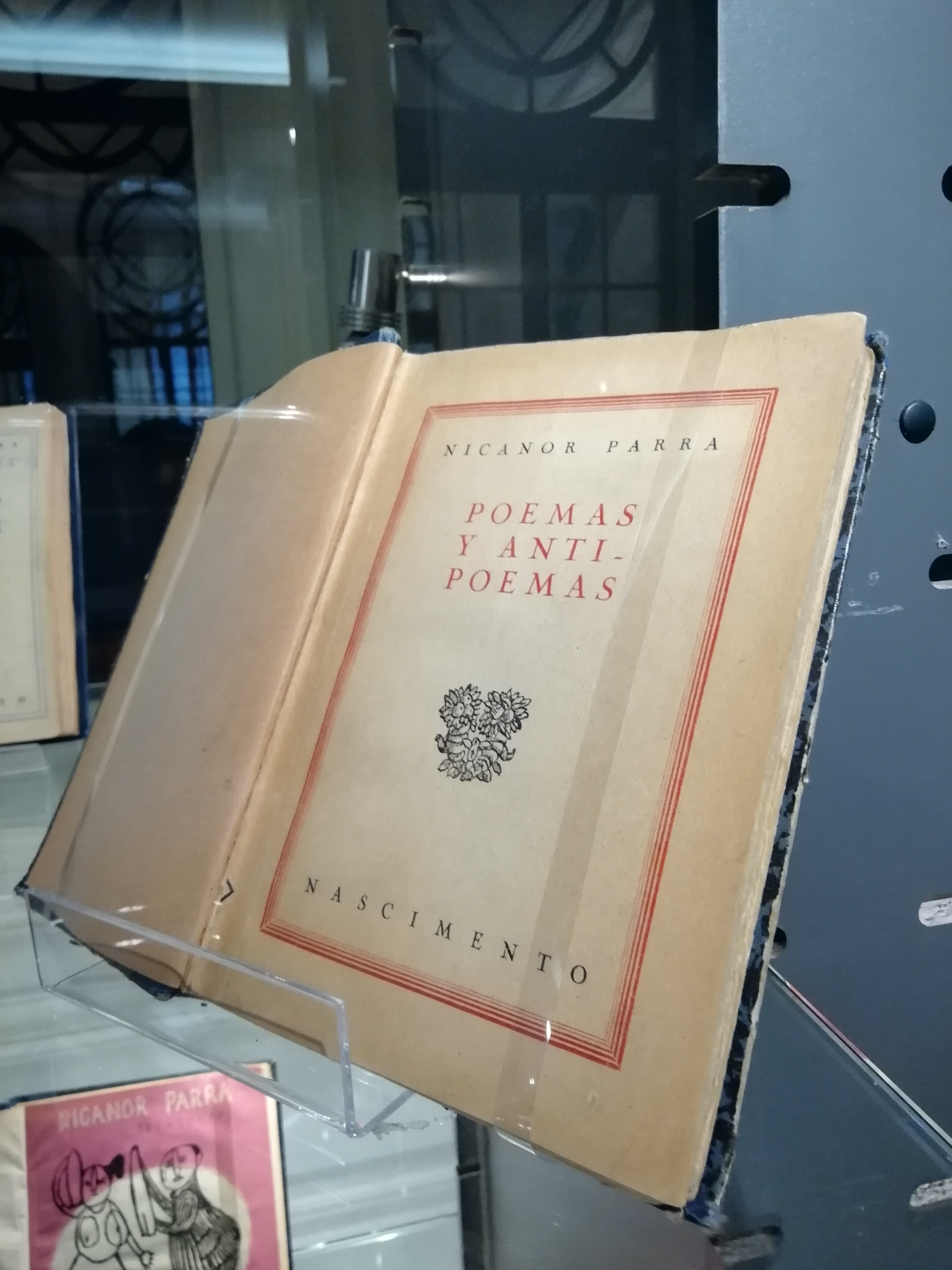
First edition of Poems and Antipoems (1954). Exhibition on Nicanor Parra at the National Library of Chile in 2019

Nascimento had begun his publishing activities in 1917, thanks to the impetus of his manager Carlos George-Nascimento, who had inherited part of the bookstore of the same name from his uncle Juan Nascimento. The young Portuguese, who had just arrived in Chile in 1905, was completely unfamiliar with the world of books. He only had the desire to promote national literary creation and faith in the talent of Chilean writers.

In those days, publishing a book required enormous efforts. National authors had to resort to self-publishing with minimal print runs to disseminate their works, since there were no means for books to circulate throughout the country. And although it was not easy to start a publishing company, Carlos George-Nascimento had a vision: "to impose the Chilean literary book as an evident manifestation of Chilean literature".

The inaugural act of Editorial Nascimento was the printing of a second edition of the book Elemental Geography by Luis Caviedes in 1917. This publication brought Carlos George-Nascimento significant profits, reaffirming his idea that a publishing company had great prospects in Chile. He managed to contact two Chilean intellectuals who advised him in his beginnings: Eduardo Barrios and Raúl Simón. Together with them he started his publishing house.

The success of his first publications prompted him to buy his own printing press. In 1923 he acquired an old Marinoni machine and rented a workshop to increase his production. This marked the beginning of his brilliant publishing career and that year he undertook the task of printing the first edition in Chile of Gabriela Mistral's Desolación. Later, in 1923, he worked on Crepusculario y Veinte poemas de amor y una canción desesperada by Pablo Neruda. The association with Neruda lasted for almost 50 years, intermittently.

As time went by, Carlos George-Nascimento was gradually seduced by the cultural spirit of his project, leaving aside the commercial orientation that his company once had. Thanks to this, by 1931 the publishing house had a wide catalogue of authors and published works. At the same time, and in the same direction, he inaugurated the tradition of literary gatherings, which brought together many writers of the time every Saturday in his bookstore.

Among its workers is the designer Mauricio Amster, who arrived in Chile aboard the Winnipeg. Amster's legacy can be seen in his numerous works for the publishing house, where he is credited with phrases such as "Mauricio Amster designed the edition."

Carlos George-Nascimento died in 1966. By then, his publishing house had already published more than six thousand titles. His work was continued by his son Carlos, who was in charge until 1986, when the closure of the publishing house was announced. One of his greatest contributions was the publication of the series of autobiographies of Chilean writers, based on the conferences ¿Quién es quién en las letras chilenas?, which were called ¿Quién soy?

In 1986, after 111 years of prolific career, Editorial Nascimento had to close its doors, thus ending a relevant stage in the history of Spanish-language literature of the 20th century. According to his granddaughter, censorship in Chile was due to the dictatorship of Augusto Pinochet and the lack of modernization of the business model, which was then in the hands of George Nascimento's sons.

== Acknowledgements ==
In March 2014, Felipe Reyes published the fourth biography of his life, entitled Nascimento: el editor de los chilenos.

From December 2014 to March 2015, the National Library of Chile together with the Embassy of Portugal in Santiago and the Lectorate of Camões I.P., launched the exhibition "Nascimento, from sea to sea, an editorial odyssey" about the editor and his work.

The exhibition was replicated at the National Library of Portugal between May and August 2016. The granddaughter, Ximena George-Nascimento, was interviewed by various media in different parts of the world, telling part of her grandfather's story to Portuguese television.

On December 1, 2017, the British Library celebrated the 100th anniversary of the founding of Nascimento Publishing House in London - in the main auditorium with the participation of Bianca Jagger, Rosana Manso, the editor Bill Swainson and Neruda's biographer, Adam Feinstein - and, in particular, the emphasis was placed on its relationship with its best-known writer, Pablo Neruda, who was published from the beginning of his career until his final days by Nascimento. The great-grandson, Pablo George-Nascimento, opened the presentation and participated in the discussion describing the close relationship between poet and editor. Such closeness led Neruda to dedicate his house in Isla Negra to him, after the editor gave him the funds to be able to make the purchase of it.

Don Carlos fertilized the Chilean book. Our literature contains an era that came out of the door of his business.

— Andrés Sabella.
