= Drunk Ship =

Drunk Ship is the translation from Spanish of the 50 pages collection of poems Barco Ebrio by Salvador Reyes Figueroa, originally published in 1923, Santiago, Chile, by editorial Nascimiento. It is the very first work of this writer.

== Contents ==
The book features a number of poems with marine subjects, whose titles are:

- Espejo
- Evocación
- Puerto
- Taberna
- Viaje
- Barco
- Sombra
- Partida
- Mía
- Tea Room
- Holocausto
- Ruta
- Soledad
- Saudade
- Pasado
- Intensidad
- Anhelo
- Música
- Cantar de los cantares
- Peregrinario
- Ciudad de oro
- Film
- El oso
- Nocturno
- Otoño
- Cabaret

== Effect ==
Drunk Ship spoke about marine subjects in a casual style. For that reason, it was not unnoticed by the formal local cultural environment of its time. García Oldini, for instance, considered it one of the books that changed Chilean poetry:

Ha sido el primero en afirmar que la poesía es música, y como tal no se piensa, sino que se siente... más allá de la conciencia en donde principia el hombre

He has been the first to state that poetry is music, so it is not to be thought, but felt... beyond that point of conscience where man starts

— García Oldini, Claridad magazine Nº 92, June 9, 1923.

Arthur Rimbaud used the same title for one of his poems.
