= Enrique Campos Menéndez =

Chilean writer (1914–2007)

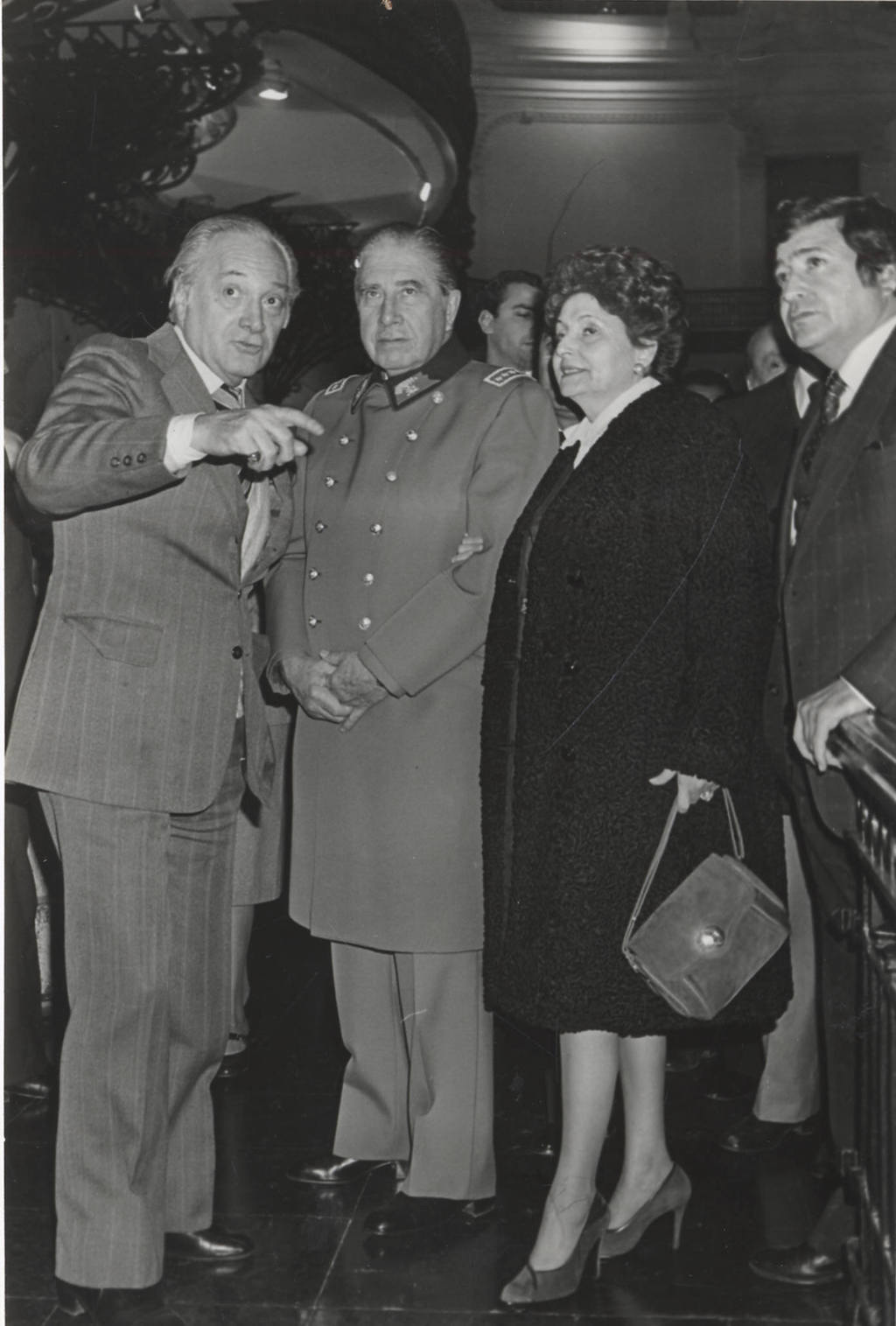
Augusto Pinochet, Lucía Hiriart and Enrique Campos Menéndez

Enrique Campos Menéndez, Marquis of Torreblanca (12 August 1914 – 12 June 2007), was a Chilean writer. He won the Chilean National Prize for Literature in 1986.

== Early life and education ==
Menéndez was born in Punta Arenas on 12 August 1914. He was the son of Francisco Campos Torreblanca and Maria Menendez Behety. He pursued studies at the Colegio Salesiano, San José, in his hometown, in Europe and finally at the Faculty of Economics at the University of Buenos Aires.

== Career ==
Menéndez was elected representation of the Cautín Province (1949–1953 and 1953–1957) for the Liberal Party. He was chairman of the Foreign Affairs Committee of the Chamber of Representatives. He was a close associate of the military dictatorship of Augusto Pinochet, who was also a personal friend.

In 1976, he was appointed a member of the Chilean Academy of Language. He directed the film Largo Viaje (Long Haul) in conjunction with a Spanish producer. He was appointed Director of Libraries, Archives and Museums (1977–1986), during which time the Palace of the Royal Court was renovated so that it could be occupied by the current National Historical Museum. Additionally, with support from UNDP, he did an analysis of the museums in Chile. The National Coordination of Museums, the National Center for Conservation and Restoration, and the National Coordination of Public Libraries were established. The network of public libraries was also expanded and the National Library became the head of the National Network of Bibliographic Information.

== Death ==
In 1986 he was awarded the National Literature Prize of Chile, the same year he was appointed ambassador of Chile in Spain. He died on 12 June 2007, aged 92, of cardiac arrest.

== Works ==
The literary of genre of Menéndez' works were of a narrative style. The following are some of his major works.

- Kupén: cuentos de la Tierra del Fuego (1940)
- Bernardo O'Higgins: el padre de la patria chilena (1942)
- Fantasmas (1943)
- Lincoln (1945)
- Todo y nada (1947)
- Lautaro Cortés (1949)
- Se llamaba Bolívar (1954)
- Sólo el viento (1964)
- Los pioneros (1983)
- Águilas y cóndores (1986).
- Una vida por la vida (1996)
- Andrea (1999)

Preceded by Braulio Arenas	Premio Nacional de Literatura de Chile; 1986	Succeeded by Eduardo Anguita

Preceded by Fernando Zegers Santa Cruz	Ambassadors of Chile to Spain; 1986–1990	Succeeded by Juan Gabriel Valdés
