= Atenea =

Chilean academic journal

- Discipline: Arts, social science, literature, humanities, history
- Language: Spanish

Publication details
- History: 1924–present
- Publisher: University of Concepción (Chile)
- Frequency: Biannual

Standard abbreviations
- ISO 4: Atenea

Indexing
- ISSN: 0716-1840 (print); 0718-0462 (web)
- LCCN: 82642642
- OCLC no.: 56417036

Links
- Journal homepage

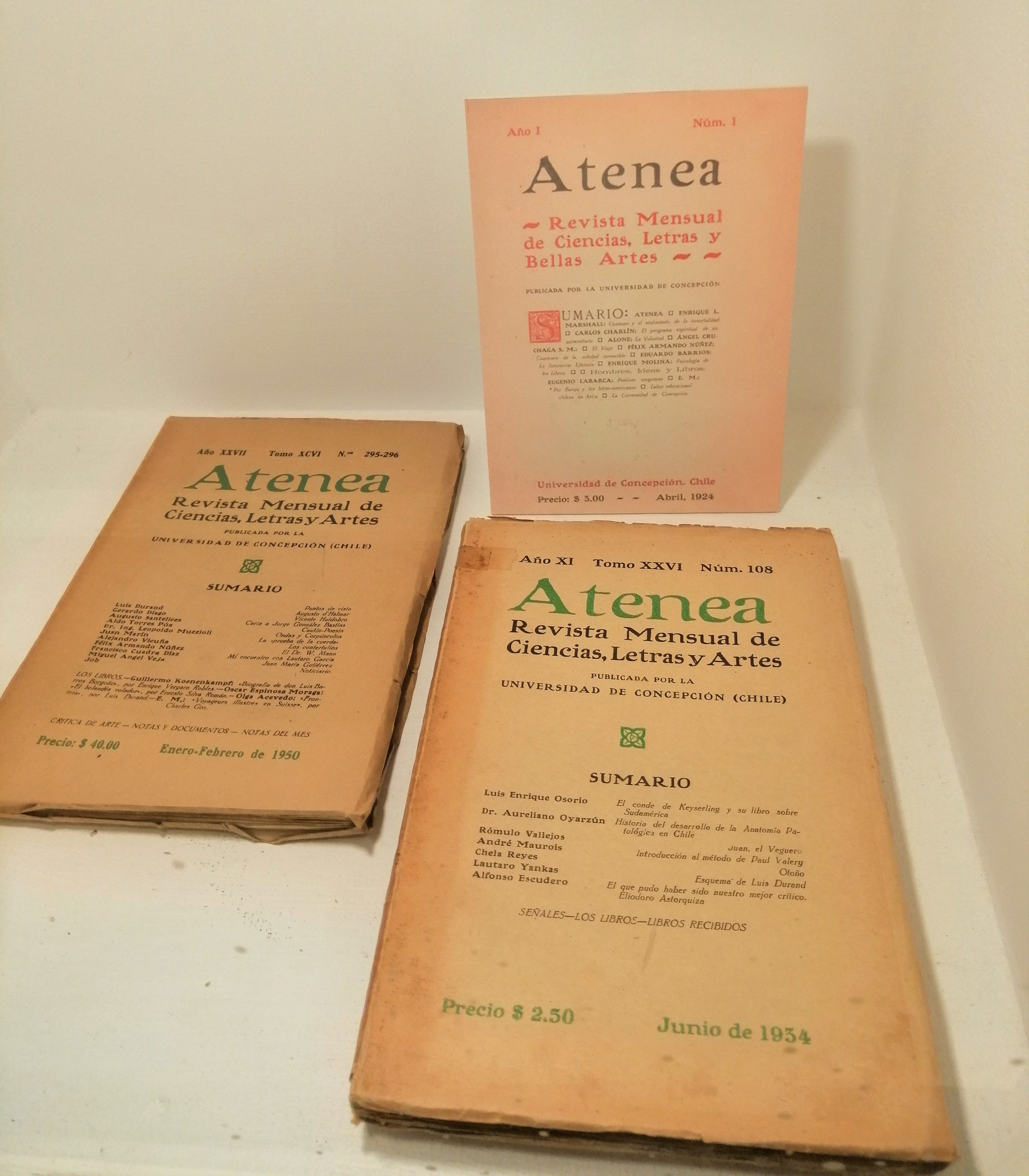

Atenea is a biannual peer-reviewed academic journal containing research and critical reflections on Chilean and Latin American culture including arts, literature, history, sociology, and other sciences. It is published by the University of Concepción. The journal is abstracted and indexed in Arts and Humanities Citation Index, Hispanic American Periodicals Index, SciELO, and Redalyc.
