= Hans Mersmann =

Musicien allemand

Hans Mersmann (6 August 1891 – 24 June 1971) was a German music historian, musicologist and teacher of music.

== Life ==
Born in Potsdam, Mersmann studied in Munich and Berlin. He received his doctorate in 1914. One year later he was commissioned by the Prussian Folk Song Commission to create a folk song archive. From 1924 to 1933, he was editor-in-chief of the magazine "Melos". In 1926, he became a professor at the Technische Hochschule in Charlottenburg (now Technische Universität Berlin). In 1933, after the Nazi takeover, he was dismissed from the university on the grounds that he had worked in the field of Neue Musik. He was then obliged to give private music lessons. In 1935, he was still stigmatized as "Bolshevik of Music" by the Militant League for German Culture.

From 1947 to 1957, he taught at the Hochschule für Musik und Tanz Köln.

Mersmann died in Cologne aged 79.

== Works ==
- Kulturgeschichte der Musik in Einzeldarstellungen. Berlin 1921–25
- Angewandte Musikästhetik. Berlin 1926
- Die Tonsprache der neuen Musik. Mainz 1928
- Die Kammermusik (Führer durch den Konzertsaal, begonnen von Hermann Kretzschmar), 4 volumes. Leipzig 1930, also 1933.
- Eine deutsche Musikgeschichte. Sanssouci, Potsdam / Berlin [1934]
- Musikhören. Sanssouci, Potsdam / Berlin 1938, 2nd edition 1952
- Musikgeschichte in der abendländischen Kultur. Hans F. Menck Verlag, Frankfurt, 1955.
