= Sady Zañartu =

Chilean writer (1893–1983)

Sady Zañartu (May 6, 1893 – March 5, 1983) was a Chilean writer who created foundational works in the genres of Criollismo, historical anecdote, and patriotic valorization of the nation. He won the Chilean National Prize for Literature in 1974.

== Life ==
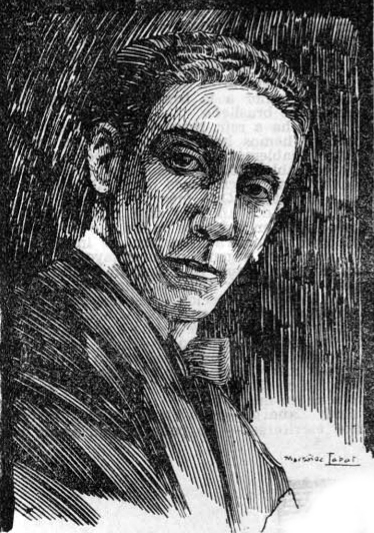
Sady Zañartu

Sady Zañartu was born in the town of Taltal, Chile, the younger of two sons. His parents, Víctor Zañartu de la Cruz and Edelmira Bustos Frías, were farmers in the Copiapó Valley who also worked for a good part of their lives as miners. When he was very young, he moved to Santiago to study at the Internado Nacional Barros Arana, the Instituto de Aplicación, and the Instituto Nacional.

Although he did not go on to a college career, Zañartu dedicated himself to research, and he always remained close to the intellectual circles of the era, such as the salons held by Delia Matte. He was also the founder of the Sociedad de Escritores de Chile, the Pen Club de Chile, and the Instituto de Conmemoración Histórica.

Zañartu was motivated by a passion to search for ever greater knowledge, and he had a sharp understanding of literary currents. He said of his own life:

I began to write when I was completing my military service, at 20 years old. When I left for the military camp, I sent stories to the newspaper La Mañana. I gathered up these chronicles in 1915, and put together the book Desde el Vivac.

By that point he had also written the official song of the Buin Regiment, which would make it famous. This may be where his affinity for patriotic themes, historical stories, and nationalistic motifs originated. In his work, Zañartu would search through archives, consult documents, read everything there was to read on a subject that interested him, speak with the people involved, and travel to the locations where the action had happened. His literary work was precise and faithful.

Zañartu was the director of the magazine Zig-Zag from 1925 to 1929. He also contributed to the newspapers La Nación and Los Tiempos. He was actively involved in the publications of the Gaceta Literaria in 1944. For his distinguished work as a writer and journalist, he received the Athena Award of the University of Concepción.

The famous Chilean critic Omer Emeth said in 1927 of Zañartu's novel La sombra del corregidor:

With four or five novels like that of Sady Zañartu, we could make an excellent study of the history of Chile.

In 1940, he took up the post of cultural attaché in Lima during the administration of Pedro Aguirre Cerda. He died in 1983, in Valparaíso, and was buried in Santiago.

=== A controversial National Prize ===
Zañartu received the Chilean National Prize for Literature in 1974, but his selection raised suspicion and controversy on Chile's intellectual and political left. The historical context of the award was the first years of Chile's military dictatorship under Augusto Pinochet, and the opinion spread widely that the writer, who was considered by some to be a minor author, was only given the National Prize because he was one of the few intellectuals who were close to the newly installed regime.

Left-leaning critics protested against the awarding of the prize to Zañartu and, the following year, to Arturo Aldunate Phillips, the author of essays on popular science. They also subsequently protested the prize going to the linguist Rodolfo Oroz, whose best-known work was a Scholastic Dictionary of the Spanish Language.

However, in explaining its selection of Zañartu, the jury argued that it had been "very clear in specifying our motives for the unanimous selection: 1. For his broad and deep literary activity over 54 years. 2. His representation of Chilean identity across his works, such as La sombra del corregidor and others, that add up to a total of 20 literary and historical books. 3. In honor of his work to protect the great values of the nation and because Sady Zañartu, at 82 years of age, continues to actively produce artistic work."

== Works ==
- Desde el vivac, 1915.
- Sor Rosario, 1916.
- La danzarina del fuego, 1918.
- La sombra del corregidor, 1927.
- Llampo brujo, 1933.
- Lastarria, el hombre solo, biography, 1938.
- Chilecito, regional stories, 1939.
- Mar hondo, memoir, 1942.
- El Tile viejo y sus cuentos, stories, 1963.
- Tomelonco, agrarian poetry, 1968.
- Color América, stories, 1969.

== Awards and honors ==
- In 1933, he received the Revista Americana de Buenos Aires Prize.
- In 1938, he received the Athena Award of the University of Concepción.
- In 1974, he received the Chilean National Prize for Literature.
- In 1974, he was designated an honorary member of the Academia Chilena de la Lengua.
