= Hernán del Solar =

Chilean writer (1901–1985)

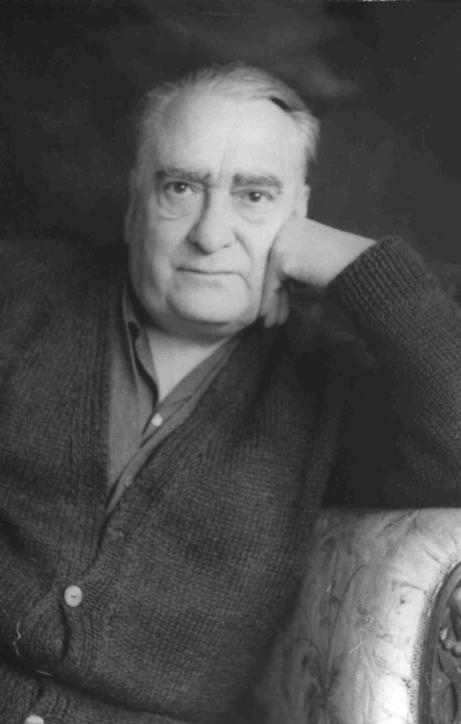
Hernán del Solar Aspillaga

Hernán del Solar (1901–1985) was a Chilean critic, essayist, poet, novelist, translator and creator of children 's stories Chile. He was awarded the National Prize for Literature in 1968. He won the Chilean National Prize for Literature in 1968.

== Works ==
He was a storyteller, poet and he also did translations, since he had a solid knowledge of French, English, Italian, Portuguese and Catalan. He translated more than 80 books.

Some of his works are:

- Paths (1919, his first play)
- Fran and Javiera For Ever (1937)
- Green Wind (1940)
- The night across the street (1952)
- Chilean poetry in the first half of the 20th century (1953)
- Men and Things (1959)
- Appendix of one hundred contemporary authors
- When the Wind Gone (1965)
- The Bambi Street Crime (1967)
- The Adventures of Totora
- Brief study and anthology of the National Literature Awards (1965)
- The Best Tales (1969)
- National Literature Awards (1975)
- Exploits of Nap and Moses (1976)
- Children's Tales (1978)
- The Red Moon (1984)
- Mac the Unknown Microbe (1946)
- The man in the top hat

== Awards ==
- Camilo Henriquez Award (1954)
- National Prize for Literature (1968)
- Ricardo Latcham Award (1971)
