= Pedro Prado =

Chilean painter, poet, and architect (1886–1952)

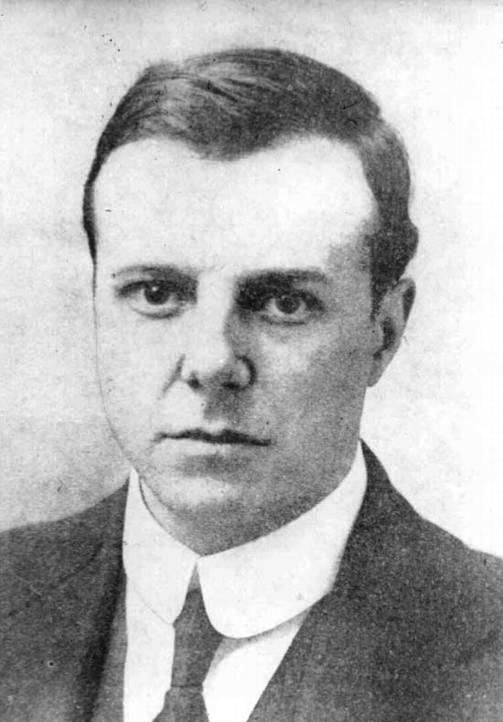
- Prado before 1936

Ambassador of Chile to Colombia
- In office 1927 – December 1928
- President: Carlos Ibáñez del Campo

Personal details
- Born: Pedro Prado Calvo; 8 October 1886 Santiago, Chile
- Died: 31 January 1952 (aged 65) Viña del Mar, Chile
- Spouse: Adriana Jaramillo Bruce (m. 1910)
- Children: 9
- Education: University of Chile
- Writing career
- Notable awards: National Prize for Literature, 1949

Pedro Prado Calvo (8 October 1886 – 31 January 1952) was a Chilean painter, poet, architect and diplomat. Prado was awarded the National Prize for Literature in 1949.

== Biography ==
Prado was born Pedro Prado Calvo on 8 October 1886 in Santiago to Absalón Prado Marín, a physician, and Laura Calvo Mackenna. (Note: Also cited as Laura Calvo Prado.) His mother died when he was two years old and his father died in 1905. In 1895, Prado was admitted to the Instituto Nacional General José Miguel Carrera, where he studied the humanities until 1903. He also took elective courses in German, accounting, painting, and music. Prado finished the last two years of his college education at the School of Engineering of the University of Chile. He then studied at its School of Architecture for three years without earning a degree. He began to pursue his interest in painting at that time, receiving lessons from Pedro Lira, a prominent Chilean artist of the 19th century.

It was around this time that Prado traveled to northern Chile, then southern Argentina. In 1910, he was elected President of the Federation of Students in Chile (FECH) and attended the Congress of Students in Buenos Aires as a delegate. Prado helped found the Chilean literary group Los Diez in 1914. In 1949 he was awarded the National Prize for Literature.

== Writer ==
He began writing poetry with “Flores de cardo”, a book published in 1908, which broke the mold of metric rhyme and marked the introduction of free verse in his country. In 1912, “La casa abandonada” introduced prose poetry, breaking the tradition of versified poetry and founding poetic prose. In 1913, he published “El llamado del mundo”, which was followed in 1915 by the prose poem “Los diez, el claustro, la barca”. That same year, “Los Pájaros Errantes” emerged, which is reputedly his most accomplished lyrical work, utilizing Parnassianism and symbolism. His poetic creations continued with Las Copas in 1921, Karez y Roshan in 1921, and the dramatic poem Androvar in 1925.

He was a deeply philosophical novelist and his work infused creative and poetic imagery with the features of the novels popular within the region at the time. In this genre, he debuted in 1914 with “La reina de Rapa Nui”, an exotic novel where, in the guise of a simple love story, elements of Easter Island folklore are presented. In 1920, he produced his most important and well-known work: Alsino, a story with a mythical and philosophically relevant plot, written in prose and full of poetic and symbolic language. It tells the story of a small peasant boy who dreams of emulating Icarus; he leapt from a tree, and as a result of the rough landing, he grew a hump on his back from which wings extended, allowing him to fly just as he desired. The author called it a “romantic poem”. In 1924, he published Un juez rural, a realistic-folkloric novel that was, to some extent, autobiographical. It reflected the authors beliefs as to the meaning of justice, the dilemmas of those who manage it, and the extent of its consequences.

As an essay writer in 1916, he wrote Ensayo Sobre Arquitectura y Poesía, a book in which he elaborates his architectural thought. Later, his relationship with architecture is described in “A los Estudiantes de Arquitectura,” published in 1919 in Juventud Nº 3 magazine, as well as “Del Sacrificio y la Salvación de la Belleza,” published in the 16th edition of the same magazine, and “El arte obrero, la tradición y el porvenir, published in La Nación on July 2, 1922. In 1924, after being asked by Arturo Alessandri, he wrote the essay “Bases para un nuevo Gobierno y un Nuevo Parlamento,” without any previous political experience. The military then wanted to declare themselves as co-authors, but was denied by Prado.

In 1934, Prado’s book of sonnets was published. In 1935, Prado received the “Premio Academia de Roma,” granted by the Italian embassy. That year, he also received the Premio Municipal de Santiago. In 1949, Prado was awarded the Premio Nacional de Literatura. He was also a member of the Academia Chilena de la Lengua in 1950, replacing Arturo Alessandri.

== Well-rounded intellectual ==
As a painter, having taken lessons with Pedro Lira, Prado devoted himself to the painting of Chilean landscapes and illustrated various publications of the time, including some of his own. In 1917 he received the Third Place Medal in Painting award at the Annual Exhibition of Fine Arts in Santiago. In 1918 he became a founding member of the National Society of Fine Arts created by Juan Francisco González. He held a showing at the Official Exhibition of Santiago in 1921, and that same year was named director of the Chilean National Museum of Fine Arts, a position which he held until 1923. In 1922 he held a showing at the Winter Exposition of the Artists’ Society of Chile in Santiago.

As an architect he stressed his concern for the urban landscape, becoming a staunch critic of the planning of Santiago. While serving as director of the National Museum of Fine Arts, he directed repairs to the building and criticized the precarious conditions of its construction, which left it unfinished and with evident structural flaws only a decade after its opening. Within the museum, the Palacio Bruna stands out, an embassy and consulate of the United States.

Prado represented Chile as a diplomat two times, first in 1925 for the celebration of the centennial of the Bolivian Declaration of Independence, and again in 1927 when he was appointed the Plenipotentiary Minister of Chile by Emiliano Figueroa in Colombia. He held this position until December 1928, and was awarded by Colombia with the Order of Boyaca, commander's grade.

== Personal life ==
On 1 January 1910, Prado married Adriana Jaramillo Bruce with whom he had 9 children.

During the 1930s, Prado had his first stroke which resulted in aphasia. A third stroke in 1949, severely affected Prado physical independence.

Prado died following a stroke on 31 January 1952 in Viña del Mar.

== Works ==
- Flores de cardo, poetry, Imprenta Universitaria, Santiago de Chile, 1908
- La casa abandonada, poetic prose, Imprenta Universitaria, Santiago de Chile, 1912
- El llamado del mundo, poetry, Imprenta Universitaria, Santiago de Chile, 1913
- La reina de Rapa Nui, novel, Imprenta Universitaria, Santiago de Chile, 1914
- Los diez, El claustro, La barca, poetic prose, Imprenta Universitaria, Santiago de Chile, 1915
- Los pájaros errantes, poetic prose, Santiago de Chile, 1915;
- Ensayo sobre arquitectura y poesía, essay, Imprenta Universitaria, Santiago de Chile, 1916
- Las copas, poetry, Buenos Aires, Argentina, 1919
- Alsino, novel, Santiago de Chile, 1920;
- Un juez rural, novel, Editorial Nascimento, Santiago de Chile, 1924
- Androvar, poetry, Nascimento, Santiago de Chile, 1925
- Camino de las horas, poetry, Nascimento, Santiago de Chile, 1934
- Otoño en las dunas', poetry, Nascimento, Santiago de Chile, 1940
- Esta bella ciudad envenenada, poetry, Imprenta Universitaria, Santiago de Chile, 1945
- No más que una rosa, poetry, Losada, Buenos Aires, 1946
- Las estancias del amor, poetry, Editorial del Pacífico, Santiago de Chile, 1949
- Viejos poemas inéditos, anthology, Escuela Nacional de Artes Gráficas, Santiago de Chile, 1949
- Viaje de Antón Páez a la Ciudad de los Césares y otros textos, novel, Ediciones Biblioteca Nacional / Origo, Santiago, 2010.
- Entrever el cielo, anthology, Descontexto Editores, Santiago de Chile, 2023
