= Daniel de la Vega =

Chilean journalist and writer (1892–1971)

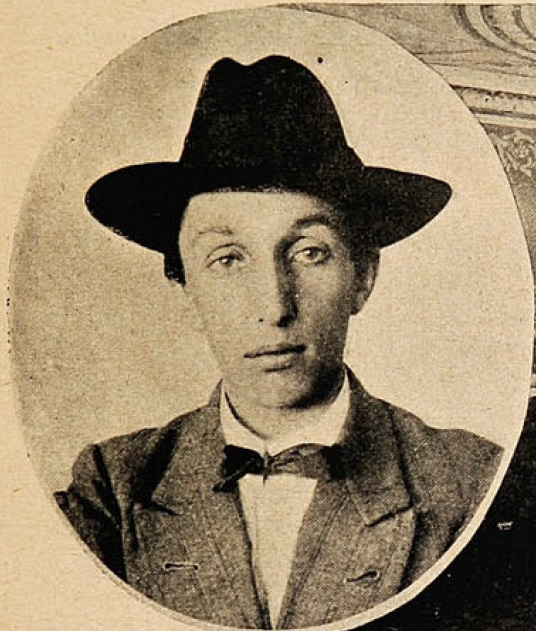
Daniel de la Vega

Daniel de la Vega (30 June 1892 – 29 July 1971) was a Chilean journalist, poet, playwright, chronicler, and novelist.

De la Vega was born in Quilpué (now part of Greater Valparaiso) into an educated family who instilled in him a love of literature. He graduated from the lyceum in Quilpué. The poetry in his first book, El calor del Terruño (1912), has been called "light and delicate" with an "arresting mysticism".

He was friends with poet and playwright Víctor Domingo Silva. In 1953, he received the 12th Chilean National Prize in Literature for his work in both journalism and theater. His primary contributions were published originally in periodicals, notably in the column "Hoy" ("Today") in Ultimas Noticias, but he put together over forty books as well. De la Vega died in Santiago de Chile.

== Works ==
- El calor de terruño 1912, several editions,
- Reino de angustias, poemas 1939
- El romancero 1934
- La luna enemiga, novela 1920
- La quintrala 1936
