= Rodolfo Oroz =

Chilean writer

Rodolfo Oroz (8 July 1895 – 13 April 1997) was a Chilean writer, professor, and philologist. He won the Chilean National Prize for Literature in 1978.

== Biography ==
Rodolfo Oroz was born on 8 July 1895 In Santiago Chile to Parents Ruperto Oroz Velásquez and Elena Scheibe Röder. In 1915 he started studying classical and modern literature at Leipzig University. He graduated in 1922 receiving a doctorate in philosophy. Between 1933 and 1944, he was director of the Pedagogical Institute of Santiago, and in 1944 he founded the Institute of Philology of Chile. He was president of the Chilean Academy of Language between 1959 and 1980, and appointed a member of the Chilean Academy of History in 1961. In 1978, he was awarded the National Prize for Literature of Chile, a fact that provoked great protests, since he was considered a scholar of linguistics rather than a writer. His academic career lasted 72 years. Rodolfo Oroz died from natural causes on 13 April 1997 In Santiago at the age of 101.
