= Hernán Díaz Arrieta =

Chilean writer (1891–1984)

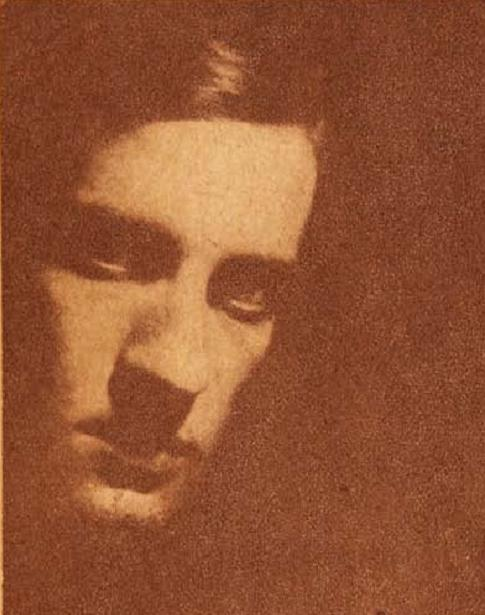
- Díaz in 1916
- Born: 11 May 1891 Santiago, Chile
- Died: 24 January 1984 (aged 92) Santiago, Chile
- Resting place: Catholic Cemetery of Santiago
- Occupation: Writer; literary critic; film critic; civil servant
- Language: Spanish
- Education: Seminary of Santiago; Instituto Superior de Comercio
- Notable awards: Atenea Award, 1940; National Prize for Literature, 1959

Hernán Díaz Arrieta (1891–1984), known by the pseudonym Alone, was a Chilean writer, literary and film critic, and civil servant. Alone was awarded the National Prize for Literature in 1959.

== Early life and education ==
Hernán Díaz Arrieta was born on 11 May 1891 in Santiago, Chile to Francisco de Paula Díaz Rodríguez and Teresa Arrieta Cañas.

Largely self-taught, Alone was initially taught to read at home by his older sister. Alone later attended the Seminary of Santiago for a year, followed by a year at the Instituto Superior de Comercio. Alone briefly attended dental school, before beginning his career at the Ministry of Justice.

== Career ==
In 1912^{α}, under the pseudonym "Alone", he published the story "A Closed Letter" (Spanish: Una carta cerrada) and fragments of a "Intimate Diary" (Spanish: Diario íntimo) in the Chilean journal Pluma y Lapiz ^{β}. Alone published his only novel in 1915 before devoting his attention to literary criticism. In a career spanning more than sixty years, Alone wrote for a wide array of newspapers and periodicals, penning, most notably, the column Crónica Literaria, which first appeared in La Nación and later in El Mercurio. He became well known for his fluid and distinct style, and is considered to be the greatest Chilean prose writer of the mid-20th century. Several writers profited from his active promotion of their work, especially María Luisa Bombal and the poet Gabriela Mistral.

Despite his vehement opposition to Communism, he nevertheless was an outspoken admirer of the poet and Pablo Neruda who was a prominent member of the Communist Party of Chile. He was a staunch catholic and supporter of the right-wing political movement that culminated in the 1973 overthrow of the leftist President of Chile, Salvador Allende.

Alone worked for the Ministry of Justice for 25 years, retiring as the section head for the Civil Registry.

== Personal life ==
Alone lived his whole life in the same residence, a house he obtained with a mortgage at the beginning of his career in the Civil Service. Nearly blind and unable to speak, Alone died on January 24, 1984, at the age of 92.

== Notable works ==
- Historia Personal de la Literatura Chilena (1954)
- Aprender a escribir (1956)
- Leer y escribir (1962)
- Preterito, Imperfecto (1976)

== Notes ==
^α Sometimes cited as 1913.

^β Named after the earlier Spanish journal Pluma y Lápiz (1900–1906)
