= Augusto d'Halmar =

Chilean writer (1882–1950)

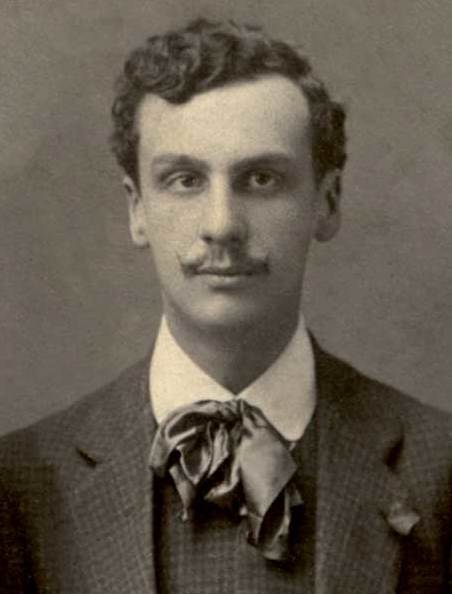
- d'Halmar in 1906
- Born: Augusto Goemine Thomson; 23 April 1882; Santiago, Chile
- Died: 27 January 1950 (aged 67); Putaendo, Chile
- Resting place: Santiago General Cemetery
- Occupations: Writer; art critic; diplomat
- Writing career
- Pen name: Augusto d'Halmar
- Language: Spanish
- Notable awards: National Prize for Literature, 1942

Augusto Goemine Thomson (23 April 1882 – 27 January 1950), known by the pen name Augusto d’Halmar, was a Chilean writer, art critic and diplomat. In 1942, d'Halmar was awarded the Chilean National Prize for Literature.

== Biography ==
Augusto Goemine Thomson was born on 23 April 1882 in Santiago to Augusto Goemine, a French navigator, and Manuela Thomson. A few days after his birth d'Halmar's mother took him to Valparaíso.

d'Halmar's pen name was in honour of his maternal great grandfather the Swede Baron de d’Halmar. His paternal great grandfather was the Scotsman Alexander Cross. Augusto was left an orphan at the age of 10 and he was reared by his stepsisters. He was a pupil in the Miguel Amunátegui Liceum from 1896 until he was interned in a Seminary which he abandoned in 1896 in order to devote himself entirely to literature. Good insights to Augusto's early life and family history can be read in "La Colonia Tolstoiana" by Fernando Santivan.

== Literary works ==
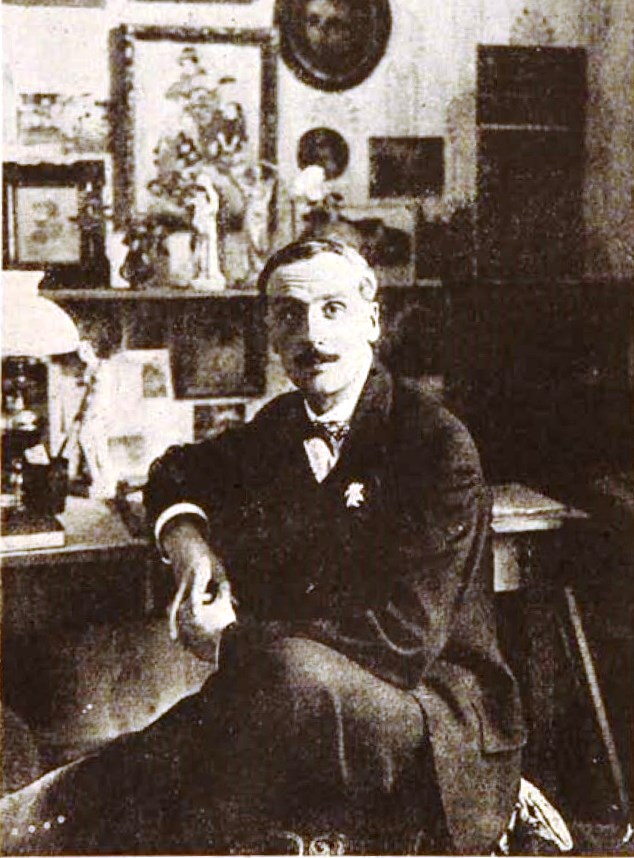
d'Halmar in 1916

- Juana Lucero, novela (1902); en 1934 se publicó con el nombre de La Lucero.
- Vía crucis, (1906)
- Al caer la tarde, teatro, (1907)
- La lámpara en el molino, novela (1914).
- Los Alucinados, novela (1917).
- La Gatita, novela corta, (1917).
- La sombra del humo en el espejo, novela, (1918).
- Nirvana, poesía (1918)
- Mi otro yo, poesía (1920).
- Cuatro evangélicos en uno, edición de lujo (1922).
- Vía Crucis, edición ilustrada (1923).
- Pasión y muerte del cura Deusto (1924)
- La Mancha de Don Quijote (1934)
- Capitanes sin barco, tres novelas, novela (1934).
- Catita y otras narraciones, cuentos (1935).
- Amor, cara y cruz, novela y cuentos (1935).
- Lo que no se ha dicho sobre la actual revolución española, poesía (1936).
- Rubén Darío y los americanos en París (1941) ensayo.
- Palabras para canciones, poesía (1942).
- Mar, novela poemática, (1945).
- Carlos V en Yuste y Castilla (1945).
- Cristián y yo, cuentos (1946).
- Los 21, ensayo (1948)
- Cursos de oratoria, (1949).
- Recuerdos olvidados, poesía (1975).
