= Chilean literature =

Chilean literature refers to all written or literary work produced in Chile or by Chilean writers. The literature of Chile is usually written in Spanish. Chile has a rich literary tradition and has been home to two Nobel prize winners, the poets Gabriela Mistral and Pablo Neruda. It has also seen three winners of the Miguel de Cervantes Prize, considered one of the most important Spanish language literature prizes: the novelist, journalist and diplomat Jorge Edwards (1998), and the poets Gonzalo Rojas (2003) and Nicanor Parra (2011).

== Chilean literature during conquest and colonial times ==
As the native cultures of the territories known today as Chile had no written tradition, (please see Mapudungun alphabet), Chilean literature was born during the Spanish conquest of the 1500s. The conquistador Pedro de Valdivia wrote letters to the king, Charles V (Carlos Primero de España), and in one of these letters, of 1554, he admiringly describes the natural beauty and landscape of the country. Along with the conquerors came missionaries to teach and convert the native peoples to Christianity, spreading not only their religion but also their language, writing and other arts and artisan skills. Chilean literature in the time of the Spanish conquest consisted mainly of chronicles of the war of Arauco. Most soldiers with the ability to write had to use the sword more often than the pen, so during the conquest and colonisation, the main role of literature was to keep historical records of the campaign. One exception to this, however, was the poem La Araucana, published in Spain in 1569, 1578, and 1589 and also known as The Araucaniad in English. La Araucana, written by Alonso de Ercilla, is the most significant epic poem in the modern Spanish language and is one of the most important works of the Spanish Golden Age (Siglo de Oro), describing the conquest of Chile in hendecasyllable verse. Later, Pedro de Oña, the first poet born in Chile, published an imitation of Ercilla, El Arauco domado (The Tamed Arauco) in 1596.

In the 17th and 18th centuries, historical work prevailed, including Historia del Reino de Chile (History of the Realm of Chile) by Alonso de Góngora Marmolejo, Histórica relación del Reino de Chile (Historical Account of the Realm of Chile) by Alonso de Ovalle; and Cautiverio feliz (Happy Captivity) by Francisco Núñez de Pineda y Bascuñán. This period also saw scientific writers like Juan Ignacio Molina, who wrote the "Ensayo sobre la Historia Natural de Chile" (An Essay on the Natural History of Chile), and the epic historical poem El Purén indómito (The Indomitable Purén), written by Fernando Álvarez de Toledo.

During the colonial period until the 19th century, literary works written by Chilean nuns spotlighted: there were spiritual letters, diaries, autobiographies and epistolaries; several writers stood out, including Tadea de San Joaquín, Úrsula Suárez and Josefa de los Dolores, whose works became the best known of its kind in the South American region.

== Independence ==
The excitement of the independence movement inspired Camilo Henríquez to launch "La Aurora de Chile" (The Dawn of Chile), Chile's first newspaper or printing operation of any kind, mostly covering politics and political philosophy. It was in print from February 13, 1812, to April 1, 1813, at which point it became El Monitor Araucano. The paper had four printed pages with two columns each, and was published weekly, every Thursday. Other journalists of the period included Manuel de Salas, José Miguel Infante, Juan Egaña Risco and Antonio José de Irisarri. In the following years, Mercedes Marín del Solar wrote the poem "Canto fúnebre a la muerte de don Diego Portales" (Dirge for the death of Don Diego Portales), and glimpses of drama appeared with Manuel Magallanes and his "La Hija del Sur" (The Daughter of the South). Critics have seen the period as one of very active and enthusiastic writers, but with limited artistic technique.

=== Romanticism ===
Romanticism in Chile can be classified in three literary generations, according to the critic Cedomil Goic: the 1837 generation, the 1842 generation and the 1867 generation, the latter of which had many parallels with realism and is considered by some critics to actually be part of the realist movement.

==== The generation of 1837 ====
Made up of writers born between 1800 and 1814 and also known as the "Generación Costumbrista", the 1837 generation developed a literary interpretation of local everyday life and manners.

Its main feature was a special emphasis on observing the picturesque and local, approaching it from a satirical and critical point of view. The group included Mercedes Marin del Solar, Vicente Pérez Rosales and José Joaquín Vallejo.

==== The 1842 generation ====
Made up of writers born between 1815 and 1829, this group was also known as the "Romantic-social" generation. Like their predecessors, they portrayed everyday life but added an extra layer of social critique to their work. The group were influenced by foreign intellectuals in Chile such as José Joaquín de Mora, Andrés Bello, Domingo Faustino Sarmiento and Vicente Fidel López and made the first attempts to found a characteristically Chilean national literature movement. The poetry of this generation resembled European Romanticism in style and included Salvador Sanfuentes' "Inami", Guillermo Matta Goyenechea's "Poesías líricas" (Lyrical poems), Guillermo Blest Gana's "Armonías" (Harmonies) and José Antonio Soffia's "Hojas de otoño". Narrative literature had a more original style and included works such as José Victorino Lastarria's "Peregrinación de una vinchuca"; Alberto Blest Gana's "Durante la reconquista" (During the reconquest) and "El loco Estero" (Estero the Mad, 1909); José Joaquín Vallejo's "Artículos de costumbres" (Essays on customs); Vicente Pérez Rosales' "Recuerdos del pasado" (Memories of the past); and Daniel Riquelme's "Bajo la tienda" (Under canvas). Dramatic works of the period included Daniel Caldera's "El tribunal del honor" (The court of honor).

From 1850, great historical works emerged such as Diego Barros Arana's Historia general de Chile (General history of Chile), Miguel Luis Amunátegui's Descubrimiento y conquista de Chile (Discovery and conquest of Chile), Benjamín Vicuña Mackenna's El ostracismo del jeneral D. Bernardo O'Higgins (The ostracism of general D. Bernardo O'Higgins) and Ramón Sotomayor Valdés' "Historia de Chile durante 40 años" (40 years of Chilean history).

In 1886, the Nicaraguan poet Rubén Darío moved to Valparaíso, Chile, where he stayed with fellow poets Poirier and Eduardo de la Barra. Together they co-authored a sentimental novel titled "Emelina". Although the novel was not an immediate success, Rubén Darío is credited with the re-emergence of Chilean lyric poetry with "Azul" (Blue) in 1888. This was followed by Carlos Pezoa Véliz' "Entierro de campo" (Country funeral) and "Tarde en el hospital" (Afternoon in the hospital), and Manuel Magallanes Moure's "La casa junto al mar" (Seaside house) and others. Carlos Pezoa Véliz only became famous after his early death at the age of 28.

=== Realism ===
The generation of 1867

Realist writers depicted everyday and banal activities and experiences instead of the more traditional romanticized or stylized representations, distinguishing them from their predecessors. This movement was made up of writers born between 1830 and 1844. Alberto Blest Gana is considered a pioneer of realist style in Chile, starting with Martín Rivas in 1862, a portrait of the Chilean society of the time. Blest Gana describes what he saw as positive changes in Chilean society, which, at the time, was moving towards capitalism. He believed it was inevitable that local traditions would disappear and be replaced with European customs, and felt that opposition to these changes was old-fashioned and futile. In contrast, fellow writer Luis Orrego Luco observed the transformations with sadness and denounced the moral consequences of this process of change. The opposing views of Blest Gana and Orrego Luco are the most important representation of the realism movement in Chile. Other important writers of the generation were Daniel Barros Grez, Eduardo de la Barra, Zorobabel Rodríguez, José Antonio Soffia, Moisés Vargas and Liborio Brieba. During this period, narrative literature advanced more than poetry or drama, although the construction of new theatres encouraged some development in the latter. Important theatres include the Victoria in Valparaíso, inaugurated in 1844, the República in Santiago, inaugurated in 1848, and Teatro Municipal de Santiago, inaugurated in 1857.

== 20th century ==
=== Criollismo ===
Also known as Costumbrismo, Criollismo was a literary movement that was active from the end of the 19th century to the first half of the twentieth century. An extension of Realism, it portrayed the scenes, customs and manners of the writer's country, with some hints of patriotism. The first centenary of Chilean independence in 1910 fed the patriotic spirit of the nation and its writers, and saw a renewed emphasis of rural life in contrast to the traditional focus on urban life as the only source and background of stories. In prose literature, Baldomero Lillo's Sub Terra and Sub Sole were among the most important, as well as Mariano Latorre's Zurzulita and Cuna de cóndores (Cradle of condors) and Federico Gana's Días de campo (Country days). Key drama works included Antonio Acevedo Hernández' Árbol Viejo (Old Tree), and Chañarcillo.

=== Chilean poetry 1900–1925 ===
During the first quarter of twentieth century, a new Chilean literary scene emerged: an Avant-garde movement. The first manifestation of this movement was "Flores de cardo" (Thistle flowers) by Pedro Prado in 1908, a work that broke with metric restraints and the rules of poetry. Prado also published "El llamado del mundo" (The call of the world) and "Los pájaros errantes" (The wandering birds) in 1913 and 1915, and founded artistic group "Los Diez" with architect Julio Bertrand. in 1916.

On December 22, 1914, Gabriela Mistral - who would later win the Nobel Prize in Literature - won the "Juegos Florales de Santiago" poetry contest, her first recognition as a great talent. In 1919, Gabriela Mistral published Desolación, the work that won her the Nobel Prize in Literature in 1945. Desolación, Tala, Lagar were some of her most important poetic works. In 1914, Vicente Huidobro published El arte del sugerimiento (The art of suggestion) and Non serviam, two works that initiated the Creacionismo movement which saw a poem as a truly new thing, created by the author for the sake of itself. Huidrobro published the "manifesto" of the movement in his book El espejo de agua (The water mirror) in 1916. Ángel Cruchaga, another poet of this generation, took "love" as his main topic and was known for the sadness of his poems. In 1915, he published "Las manos juntas" (Holding hands), his most characteristic work. Pablo de Rokha used poetry to portray his anarchic, combative and controversial view of the world. Key works include "El folletín del Diablo" and "Los gemidos", published in 1920 and 1922 respectively. In 1938, Pablo de Rokha founded and managed the publishing house Multitud, which distributed books in the United States, Russia and Latin America. Also in this period, between 1914 and 1925, Juan Guzmán Cruchaga published Junto al brasero (Beside the brazier), La mirada inmóvil (The motionless gaze), Lejana (Far), La fiesta del corazón (Party of the heart), and the anthology Agua de cielo (Water of heaven).

During the 20th century, neo-modernist and avant-garde Chilean poets found fame beyond Chilean borders. Gabriela Mistral won the first Latin American Nobel Prize of Literature, followed by fellow Chilean Pablo Neruda. The father of the Creacionismo movement, Vicente Huidobro, also contributed to the internationalization of Chilean literature.

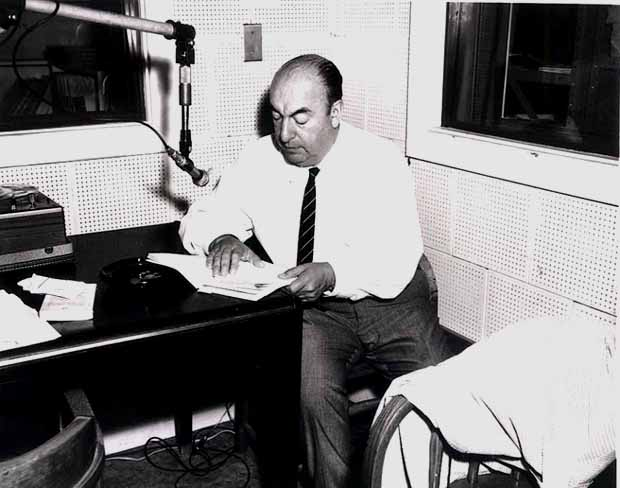
Chilean Nobel Prize winner Pablo Neruda

Pablo Neruda published the works Crepusculario (1923) and Veinte poemas de amor y una canción desesperada (1924), as a prelude to the great success he would have in the next quarter century.

=== Magical Realism ===
In the early 20th century, magical realism as a genre took to Latin American literature like a flame, becoming a fast-moving literary movement across the regions. The term was first coined by Franz Roh, a German historian and art critic, mentioning the beginnings of magic realism in his Nach Expressionismus: Magischer Realismus: Probleme der neusten Europäischen Malerei. European literature reflected the traditional and structuralist beliefs within western societies. Literature and art emphasized ideas of stoicism and piety, something that magical realism refuted. Through its use, it became another form of activism, reflecting current events and topics within its words. Roh's book went along with the typical European art sentiment, which rejected the fantastical elements of magical realism due to the strict and conforming nature of art and literature at the beginning of the century. Latin American literary circles first heard of the term through Arturo Uslar Pietri, Alejo Carpentier and Ángel Flores, using the word to describe the use of criticism in literature as well as the inclusion of regionally dependent fantastical elements. Pietri and Carpentier introduced the term as a form of critique, creating space for writers to acknowledge systemic social injustices. Flores was fascinated by the geographical differences in the genre, seeing how place and culture affect the kind of elements utilized.

Magical realism often uses themes of modernity and post-colonialism to push against European rhetorics. Modernity emerges, simultaneously with the genre, during the turn of the century. During the 19th century, industrialization became a worldwide phenomenon, growing major cities all throughout the world. Modernity included themes of isolation, social change and futurist ideas, inspired by an ever-changing society. As technology fastened, urbanization and industrialization grew, people found themselves lost in a place of anxiety, searching for an identity within this new world of new technologies. As cities grew in prominence, the whole world was changing every day, creating this worry of instability. Many authors used magical realism techniques to showcase these modernist ideas, refuting theories of a "new" and "utopia like" urban Latin America. Many of these themes are recycled from the Enlightenment period, from Europe to the Americas. Between the 19th and 20th century, Modernity emphasized European influence. Scholars, intellectuals and artists of all kinds were still traveling between the Americas and Europe, cultivating that academic exchange. But this created an internal conflict within Latin America, especially due to the region's experience with post-colonial side effects.

While literature was exchanged, a need for translation became more apparent, accommodating the multiple regions the stories would be exchanged to. However, due to the post-colonial relations between Latin America and European countries, inaccuracies in translation led to discrepancies in these stories. The activist statements supported by magical realist texts were slowly diminishing in power due to translation error.

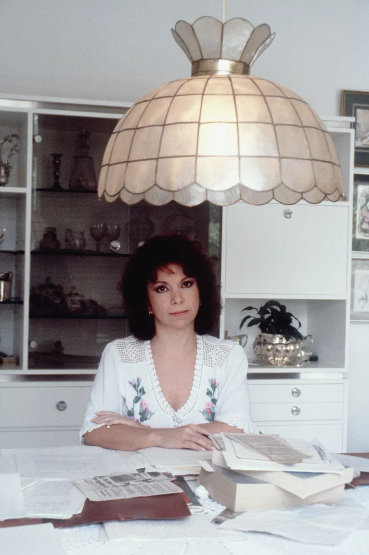
Isabel Allende at her home

Like most of Latin America during the 20th century, Chile's history was influenced through liberalism and nationalism, inspiring and pushing more writers to use post-colonial themes. Isabel Allende, a prominent magical realist author, known for her novel The House of the Spirits (1982) used Chile's post-colonial history as the backdrop for her novel, taking inspiration from her own Allende family, who were involved in Chile's social reform movements in the 1970s. Isabel Allende was closely related to Salvador Allende, former president of Chile in the 1970s. Salvador Allende's policies were socialist in nature, hoping to steer Chile's future towards a more socialist Chile. In 1973, Allende's presidency ends with a coup, with Augusto Pinochet succeeding and becoming a dictator for the next couple decades, until 1990. Isabel Allende, being a part of this politically scrutinized family, is forced to leave Chile and take refuge in Venezuela. With her experience as a writer, Allende incorporated this tense period in Chilean history into her novel The House of the Spirits.

José Donoso was another prominent Chilean writer known for his inclusion of magical realism as a theme. One of his most popular novels, The Obscene Bird of Night (1970), utilizes the abstract form of magical realism. The novel relies on multiple perspectives, as the main character slowly loses his humanity and fully transforms into an Imbuche, an indigenous Chilean mythical monster similar to European myths of changelings. The novel uses the narrator's struggles with class, education, race, and identity as stages of dehumanization, reflecting on the Chilean community's own struggles with rapidly changing environments. Donoso published this novel in 1970, when Allende was first elected and beginning his new measures.

=== Imaginismo ===
Chilean Imagism was a literary trend that started in 1925 in opposition to Criollismo, which it accused of being nationalist, narrow and lacking imagination. Imaginist writers moved away from the elements used as inspiration by previous generations (everyday life, rural life and the fight against nature). The Imaginist group, made up of writers Ángel Cruchaga Santa María, Salvador Reyes, Hernán del Solar, Luis Enrique Délano and Manuel Eduardo Hübner, broke with the most prominent literary critics of the time. Luis Enrique Délano said in an article about the origin of the Imagism: "We had not decided to innovate at all, but we had a common sense that Chilean literature was full of "Criollismo", cloying and heavy.

One achievement of the Imaginist group, along with some of the most prominent criollista writers, was the creation the magazine Letras. Although the editorial line of the magazine was imaginist, important criollista writers collaborated and it aimed to create an international dialogue about art and literature. Contributors included Augusto d'Halmar, Mariano Latorre, Marta Brunet, Luis Durand, Rosamel del Valle, Juan Marín and Jacobo Danke among others.

==== Comparison chart between Criollismo and Imaginismo ====
Criteria	Criollismo	Imaginismo
Origin	Reality: Observation and documentation.	Imagination: Observation, fantasy and sensitivity.
Nature	Descriptive, heterotelic (with a purpose) and rooted in the national.	Narrative, autotelic (containing its own meaning or purpose), universal topics
Function	Cognitive and educational: engaging the reader.	Hedonist and recreational: free the reader.

=== La Mandrágora ===
La Mandrágora (Spanish for The Mandrake) was a Chilean Surrealist group founded on 12 July 1938 by Braulio Arenas (1913–1988), Teófilo Cid, Enrique Gómez Correa and Jorge Cáceres (who was still a teenager at the time). The group met in Talca and by 1932, Braulio Arenas was exchanging ideas with Teófilo Cid and Enrique Gómez. By 1935, these ideas had become more developed, and in 1938, they held a kind of initiation ceremony reading surrealist poems and texts at the University of Chile. They went on to publish a magazine called, like the group, "La Mandrágora" (seven issues were produced on a small scale, from December 1938 to October 1943), as well as anthology of poetry, El AGC de la Mandrágora, (The AGC of the Mandrake) which included works by all founders except Teófilo Cid. Politically, the group supported the Popular Front. Among the main achievements of this group was the publication of "La Mandrágora", which promoted the surrealist movement in Chile; a conference held at the University of Chile in 1939, a surrealist exhibition held in the Biblioteca Nacional de Chile (national library of Chile) in 1941, and an international surrealist exposition in Galleria Dédalo in Santiago in 1948. Braulio Arenas also published the magazine "Leit-motiv" from 1942 to 1943, with contributions from André Breton, Benjamin Péret and Aimé Césaire, linking "La Mandrágora" with the French surrealists.

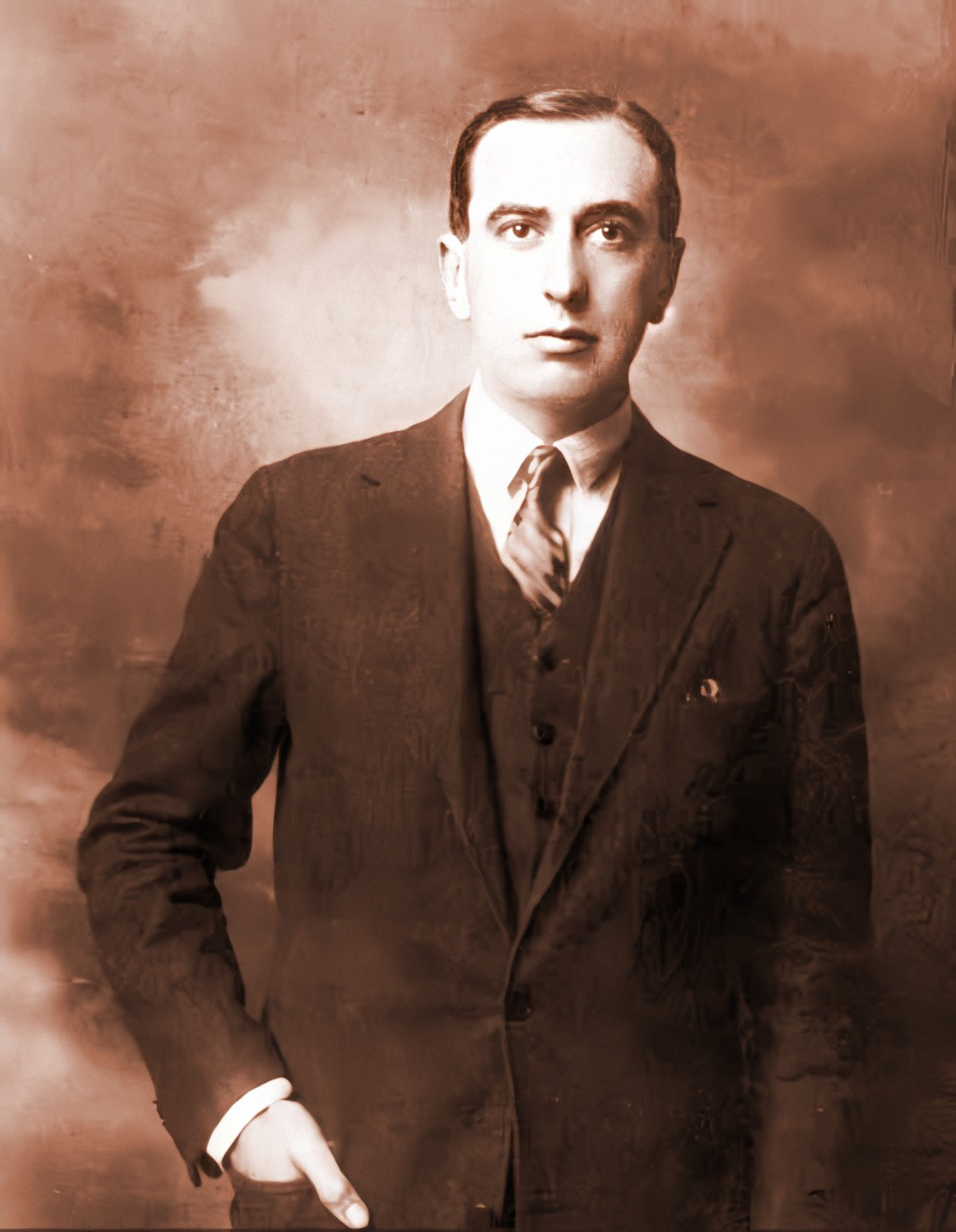
Vicente huidobro

They were known for their critique of modern Chilean poetry and Chilean writers like Pablo Neruda and Vicente Huidobro. The group began to separate in 1949. In 1957, Braulio Arenas, Enrique Gómez Correa and Jorge Cáceres published the anthology "El AGC de la Mandrágora", which included a surrealist dictionary and a bibliography of the Chilean surrealism.

=== Neocriollismo ===
The first half of the 1940s saw the emergence of the Generación neocriollista de 1940 (Neo Criollista Generation of 1940). The neocriollistas — a name that can be translated as "neo traditionalist" - put a great emphasis on local customs and wanted to portray the life of the common people in a social and human way. A key factor that influenced their ideology was the turbulent political times that they lived in, with group members committed to Marxism and left-wing political activism. One of the most important writers of this generation was Nicomedes Guzmán, who was known for including social topic in his works, such as social and economic inequality, exploitation, misery in the suburban life, moral degradation in poverty, and corruption in power. Among his most important works were Los hombres oscuros (The dark men), La sangre y la esperanza (Blood and hope), La luz viene del mar (Light comes from the sea), and Una moneda al río y otros cuentos (A coin to the river and other tales), published in 1939, 1943, 1951 and 1954. Other key writers of the generation were:

Gonzalo Drago, with works like "Cobre" (Copper), a book of stories about the struggles and hard life of the miners, published in 1941; "Surcos" (Grooves), a collection of stories about peasants published in 1948; and "El Purgatorio" (Purgatory), a novel that describes the author's experiences as a conscript during military service, published in 1951. Andrés Sabella and Volodia Teitelboim, with their works "Norte Grande" (Big North) and "Hijo del salitre" (Son of saltpeter), both describing the lives of saltpeter miners in the north of Chile. Francisco Coloane and Nicasio Tangol, who wrote about life in the extreme south of Chile. Nicasio Tangol revealed the traditions and myths of the southern island of Chiloe, Chilean Patagonia and the native peoples of that extreme region. Francisco Coloane described man's struggles in the southern seas in his works "Cabo de Hornos" and "El último grumete de La Baquedano" (Cape Hornos and The last boy of the Baquedano), both published in 1941. Maité Allamand and Marta Brunet who wrote work inspired by rural life. Brunet's play Montaña adentro (Into the mountain) is notable for its use of rural language and peasant slang to portray life in the country, while Allamand put special emphasis on children's literature and was one of the pioneers of this genre.

=== Children's literature ===
The first children's literature published in Chile date back to the period when the printing press was introduced in Chile around 1812. These texts were mainly educational and religious books, written mostly by Spanish priests in order to educate children. It was in the early 20th century when several magazines for children were founded, including Revista de los Niños (The Children's Magazine) in 1905, Chicos y Grandes (Kids and Grownups) in 1908, and El Penaca - the only one that lasted into the next decades. Around the same time, two children's books by Agustín Edwards Mac-Clure were published: "Aventuras de Juan Esparraguito" (The Adventures of Juan Little Asparagus ) and "El niño casi legumbre" (The Almost Bean Boy).

Another precursor of children's literature in Chile was Blanca Santa Cruz Ossa who compiled stories and myths from Chile and from other countries, including Cuentos rumanos (Romanian tales, 1929), Cuentos maravillosos del Japón (Marvellous tales from Japan, 1935), Cuentos de España (Tales from Spain, 1936), Cuentos Ingleses (English Tales,1936), Las hadas en Francia (Fairies in France, 1936), Leyendas de la selva (Legends of the Jungle, 1936), Leyendas moriscas (Moorish Legends, 1936), Cuentos mitológicos griegos (Greek myths and tales, 1937), Cuentos italianos (Italian stories, 1938), Cuentos servios (Serbian stories, 1939), Cuentos chinos (Chinese stories, 1940), Orejones y viracochas: Diego de Almagro (Big ears and Viracochas, 1943), Sangre y ceniza: narración novelesca de la conquista de Chile (Blood and ashes: fictional narrative of the conquest of Chile, illustrated by Coré, 1946), Cuentos chilenos, (Chilean stories, with illustrations by Elena Poirier, 1956) Cuentos bretones (Breton tales, 1973), El duende del pantano y otros cuentos de Bretaña (The Swamp Troll and other tales of Britain).

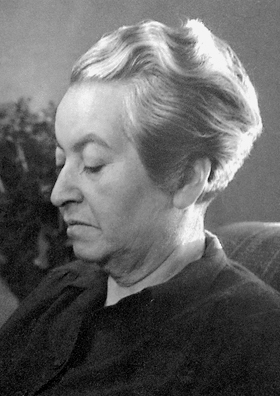
Gabriela Mistral, 1945

Maité Allamand, Carmen de Alonso and Marta Brunet also wrote children's literature inspired by Chilean folklore. Allamand produced works like Alamito el largo (The little long poplar, 1950) while Brunet wrote Cuentos para Marisol (Tales for Marisol, 1938) and Por qué el petirrojo tiene el pecho rojo (Why robins have a red chest, 1938). Around this time, Gabriela Mistral composed poetry dedicated to children, primarily in her works Tala and Ternura.

In 1964, a subsidiary of IBBY (International Board on Books for Young People) was set up in Chile, bringing together a group of writers to promote literature for children and young people. Among the writers taking part were Marcela Paz ("Papelucho"), who was also the first director of the Chilean IBBY, Maité Allamand, Chela Reyes, Gabriela Lezaeta, María Silva Ossa, Amalia Réndic and Pepita Turina. Over the years, this organization became an important meeting place for writers and was a great promoter of children's and youth literature. Other important contributors to IBBY included Alicia Morel, Lucía Gevert, Cecilia Beuchat, María Eugenia Coeymans, Felipe Alliende, Víctor Carvajal, Saúl Schkolnik, Manuel Peña Muñoz, Héctor Hidalgo, Manuel Gallegos María Luisa Silva, Jacqueline Balcells and Ana María Güiraldes.

== History ==
During the 20th century, the study of history and historical literature in Chile saw profound changes, moving away from the tradition of the great 19th century liberal historians. This was due to a combination of factors, including the ideological struggles of the time and the gradual professionalization of historical studies through the creation of institutes and specialized departments in different universities of Chile.

One of the main trends was the influential conservative school that monopolised historic debate until the 1960s. Leading writers in the school included Jaime Eyzaguirre, with his "Fisonomía histórica de Chile" (Historic physiognomy of Chile), Francisco Antonio Encina with his "Historia de Chile" (History of Chile), and Alberto Edwards with "Bosquejo histórico de los partidos políticos chilenos" (Historical sketch of the Chilean political parties, 1903), "La Fronda Aristocrática en Chile" (The Aristocratic Fronde in Chile, 1928) and "La Organización Política de Chile" (The Political Organization of Chile, 1943). These writers produced a harsh critique of 19th-century social liberalism and the changes that had occurred since the 1920s, viewing these changes as a process of decadence. Conservative historians rejected modernity and proposed a substitution of representative democracy for authoritarian regimes to ensure the maintenance of social order and the Catholic faith.

By the mid-20th century, two new historical trends has emerged that competed with the conservative school. The first, Marxist trend focused its efforts on the reconstruction and recovery of the history of Chilean working class, with writers including Julio César Jobet and Hernán Ramírez Necochea. These authors were criticized for the political-ideological character of their work, though their legacy lived on through the later generation of the 1980s, who developed a new way of describing history focused on Chilean popular movements.

The second trend brought real innovation to the study of history, introducing new techniques and research methodologies borrowed from the new European historiography, particularly the French Annales School. Historians of this school included Mario Góngora, Álvaro Jara, Rolando Mellafe, and Sergio Villalobos among others. They focused on topics that had been neglected before like economics and demographics. The vast majority of these new researchers studied at the Pedagogical Institute of the University of Chile. This new historiography movement put emphasis on the study of the long-running processes that had shaped the institutions, society and economy of Chile since colonial times. By the late 1960s, historians of this school had created links with the Marxist movement. The 1973 Chilean coup d'état put an abrupt end to this process and repressed the new social historiography, forcing these historians and researchers to flee the country. Many of them went to European universities to undertake postgraduate studies, which in the long term helped perfect their professional skills.

=== After World War II ===
As a consequence of the vast changes during World War II, Chilean literature became more universal in its themes, focusing on problems common to the whole humanity and using new modes of expression. In the novel form, key works included Manuel Rojas' Hijo de ladrón (Son of a thief), María Luisa Bombal's La amortajada (The shrouded woman) and José Donoso's El obsceno pájaro de la noche (The obscene bird of night). Key poetic works included Nicanor Parra's Poemas y antipoemas (Poems and antipoems), Humberto Díaz Casanueva's Réquiem, Eduardo Anguita's Venus en el pudridero (Venus on the garbage heap), Gonzalo Rojas' Contra la muerte (Against death), Jorge Teillier's Muertes y maravillas (Deaths and wonders), Fernando González Urízar's Los signos del cielo (The signs from heaven), Miguel Arteche's Fénix de madrugada, (Phoenix at dawn) and Raúl Zurita's Purgatorio (Purgatory). In drama, important works included Luis Alberto Heiremans' El tony chico (The small clown), Egon Wolff's Álamos en la azotea (Poplars on the roof), Jorge Díaz Gutiérrez' El cepillo de dientes (The Toothbrush) and La cantante calva (The bald singer).

=== After the 1973 coup ===
Following the coup d'état of September 11, 1973, culture diminished in Chile. The coup forced many writers to emigrate, and after a while Chilean writers began to create publishing houses and magazines in their new homes in exile. Journals published by Chileans in exile included "Araucaria" in Spain, "Literatura chilena en el exilio" (Chilean literature in exile) in California and "América Joven" (Young America) in the Netherlands. The editorials "Ediciones Cordillera" in Canada, "LAR" and "Ediciones Michay" in Spain. Chilean literature underwent a process of internationalization at this time, despite the fact that Chileans still living in Chile had lost their writers, along with most other forms of art. The mix of Magic realism and "family saga", for example, brought international fame to Antonio Skarmeta, Fernando Alegría, Gonzalo Rojas, Humberto Díaz Casanueva, Ariel Dorfman and Isabel Allende, Hernán Neira. In times of dictatorship and repression, Chilean literature contributed to raising international awareness about the situation in Chile. Virtually every major city in the western world was home to Chilean writers, many of whom denounced the regime of Augusto Pinochet,.

Possibly due to the diaspora of exile, Chilean literature during and after the dictatorship was not uniform in style. Young writers found themselves transplanted in a foreign culture, and it would take time for writers returning from exile to get used to the Chilean intellectual environment and form new groups. In poetry, there was the so-called "Nueva poesia chilena" (New Chilean poetry). This "Nueva poesia chilena" included a great number of poets coming back from exile in Europe, with Raul Zurita, Rodrigo Lira, Antonio Arévalo and Bruno Montané among the most famous.

=== Fantasy or imaginative literature, after the 2000 ===
A new generation of writers has incorporated the fantastic or imaginative literature to which Omar Pérez Santiago belongs and his book of short stories Nefilim en Alhué (2011). This trend modernizes the old school of gothic existential issues, the terrifying, the magical, the oneiric and the diabolical of popular culture, and which has its origin in María Luisa Bombal's La amortajada (1938), Elena Aldunate's Juana and cybernetics (1963) and Carlos Droguett 's Patas de perro (1965). In this current are the books Tales of gore, madness and death (2011) by Pablo Espinoza Bardi, The curious case of the shadow that died as a memory (2018) by José Baroja and Suicidal mind and other deaths (2012) by Aldo Astete Cuadra.

== The four greats of Chilean poetry ==
The four greats of Chilean poetry was the group of most important poets of Chilean literature: Gabriela Mistral, Vicente Huidobro, Pablo de Rokha and Pablo Neruda.

These four poets were linked to each other or met each other at some point in their lives. For example, while Gabriela Mistral was head teacher at the Girls' High School in Temuco, Chile, and already recognized as an outstanding poet, a teenage boy came to her with his own poems, asking for her opinion. This teenager was Neftalí Reyes, who would later take the pseudonym of Pablo Neruda and become another great Chilean poet. He would also follow in Mistral's footsteps when he won the Nobel Prize in Literature in 1971, 26 years after Mistral herself had won the highest honor in literature in 1945.

In contrast to this tenuous link, the relationship between Huidobro, De Rokha and Neruda was one of the most persistent rivalries in Chilean cultural history. They were peers, part of the same generation, and were all at some point in their lives members of the Chilean Communist Party. De Rokha would later be expelled from the party for some disagreement with the leaders, as they claim today.

Mistral expressed no political affiliation in Chile, although according to the Chilean writer Jaime Quezada, an expert on the work of Mistral, she expressed her Pan-Americanist will in her work "Tala", and expressed solidarity with the Nicaraguan revolutionary Augusto Sandino in two texts published in 1928.

The other three poets' links with the Communist party was a reflection of the political climate at the time and their desire to fight for the social change in Chile. However, personal disputes played a more important role than politics in their relationship. Pablo de Rokha became one of Neruda's bitterest enemies, considering him bourgeois and a hypocritical opportunist in political and social life. De Rokha wrote several essays and pamphlets in which he railed against Neruda, for example the poem "Tercetos Dantescos":

Gallipavo senil y cogotero
de una poesía sucia, de macacos,
tienes la panza hinchada de dinero.

Senile hypocrite and robber
of dirty monkey poetry,
your belly is bloated with money.

Huidobro joined the communist party earlier than Neruda, and was extremely politically active for much of his life. Towards the end of his life, however, he left the political sphere and retired to his house in Cartagena on the coast of Chile. Huidobro also accused Neruda of plagiarising Rabindranath Tagore and in November 1934, the second edition of "PRO" magazine published without comment two poems discovered by Huidobro's friend Volodia Teitelboim: Tagore's "Poem 30" from "The Gardener" and Neruda's very similar "Poem 16" from "20 Poems of Love". Huidobro is also known to have referred to Neruda as a "Romantic Poet" who wrote poems for 15-year-old girls.

Neruda reacted his peers' criticism by writing a text called "Aquí estoy" (Here I am), published in Paris in 1938, where he denounced their animosity and vilification. Despite this criticism, Neruda is generally recognized as one of the most influential Latin Americans poets and also one of the most critically acclaimed poets in literature.

Neruda could put an end to the conflict once de Rokha and Huidobro were dead, instead in his speech at the Nobel Prize ceremony he says referring to Huidobro: "El poeta no es un pequeño Dios" (The poet, is not a little god).

== See also ==
- Chilean culture
- Chilean cuisine
- Art of Chile
