= Mirella Latorre =

Chilean actress (1919–2010)

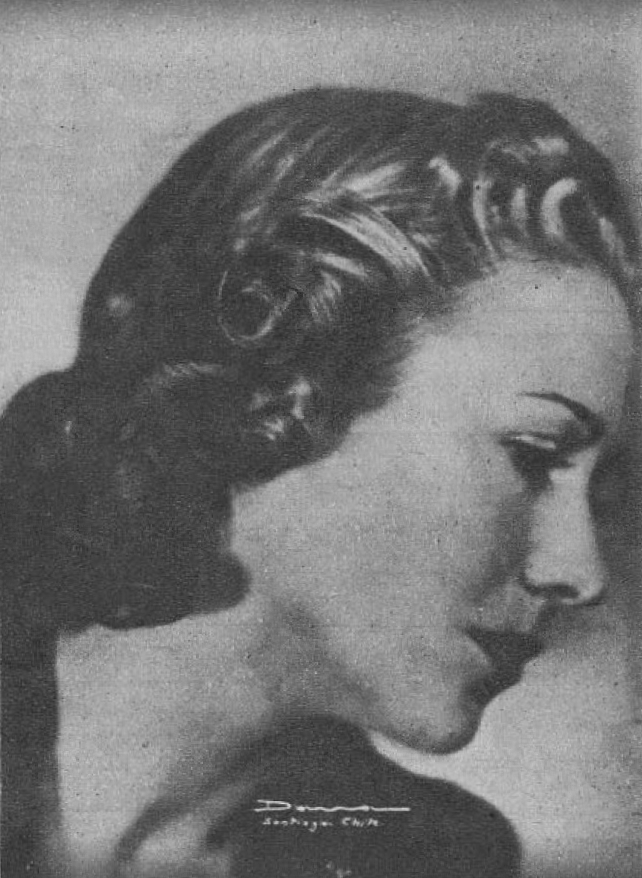
- Mireya Latorre (1941)
- Born: Mirella Latorre Blanco; 26 March 1919; Santiago, Chile
- Died: 10 June 2010 (aged 91); Santiago, Chile
- Resting place: Parque del Recuerdo
- Occupation(s): Actress, radio and TV presenter
- Spouses: Juan Emilio Pacull; Augusto Olivares
- Parents: Mariano Latorre (father); Virginia Blanco (mother)

Mirella Latorre Blanco (26 March 1919 – 10 June 2010) was a Chilean radio and television actress.

== Biography ==
The daughter of Mariano Latorre – a famous writer, father of criollismo in Chile, and National Prize for Literature winner – and Virginia Blanco, Mirella Latorre became famous in the 1940s thanks to radio dramas, fame that was consolidated with her move to television at the beginning of the 1960s.

She had two children with her first husband, Juan Emilio Pacull, the founder of the Chilean Journalists Association. Her second husband was also a journalist, Augusto Olivares, who died on 11 September 1973 at La Moneda Palace during the coup d'état led by General Augusto Pinochet against the socialist Salvador Allende.

Mirella Latorre had to go into exile; she traveled first to France and then to Cuba, where she worked in television. She presented the program Conversando con Mirella Latorre on the Tele Rebelde channel from 1976 to 1987. In 1991 she began to travel to Chile, where she was definitively reinstated in 1995. In her last six years she suffered from senile dementia. In general she was in good health, and although she did not recognize people, "she was always very happy," recalled her friend and then executive director of the Salvador Allende Foundation, Patricia Espejo in 2010. She died of a heart attack at 10:00 at the Hospital del Salvador in Santiago on 10 June 2010, at age 91. Her remains are, like those of her second husband, in the Cemetery of the Parque del Recuerdo.

== Radio career ==
In the summer of 1936, Mirella Latorre was discovered by Pedro de la Barra, who recruited her for his theater workshop at the Pedagogical Institute. This workshop later became the Experimental Theater of the University of Chile.

In the 1940s, Latorre achieved fame thanks to her participation in several radio plays, most of them co-starring with actor Emilio Gaete. Her first work in this medium was on Radio del Pacífico. She would later be on the Corporación, Minería, and Cooperativa stations.

She was also known for playing Leonora in the famed radio play Adiós al Séptimo de Línea written by Jorge Inostrosa (who would later write a book of the same name).

Latorre's last public performance took place in the radio play La epopeya final de Salvador Allende, broadcast by Radio Tierra in 2003.

== Television career ==
Mirella Latorre also served as a presenter of television programs during the medium's first years in Chile. She joined Canal 13 in 1961. In the middle of the decade she moved to Canal 9, where she presented several programs dedicated to women, such as Mireya 14 1/4 and Mundo femenino. In 1967 she returned to Canal 13, where she starred in Los días jóvenes, considered the first Chilean telenovela, and presented the evening program Pasado meridiano (1968). She also became one of the first newsreaders in Chile as the host of the evening news program on Canal 13.

In 1971, Mirella Latorre joined Televisión Nacional de Chile (TVN), where she presented the lunchtime program Almorzando con Mirella, which would later become Buenas tardes Mirella, one of the most memorable shows of the state channel's first years.
