= Criollismo =

Hispanic American literary movement

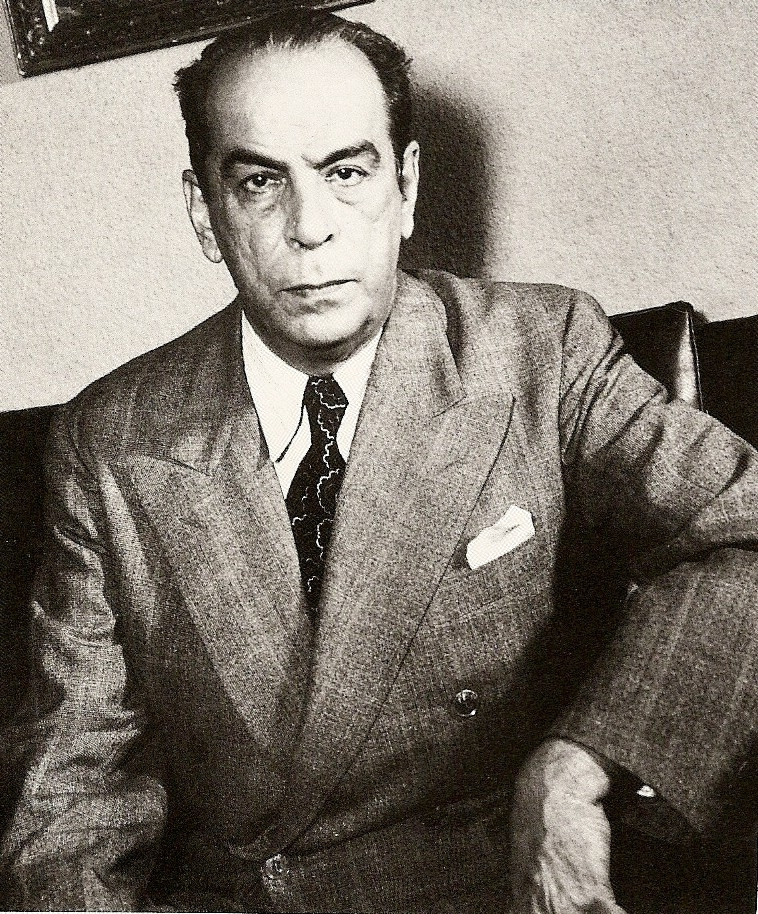
Rómulo Gallegos

Criollismo (Spanish pronunciation: [kɾjoˈʎismo]) is a literary movement that was active from the end of the 19th century to the beginning of the 20th century throughout Hispanic America. It is considered the Hispanic counterpart to American literary regionalism. Using a realist style to portray the scenes, language, customs and manners of the country the writer was from, especially the lower and peasant classes, criollismo led to an original literature based on the continent's natural elements, mostly epic and foundational. It was strongly influenced by the wars of independence from Spain and also denotes how each country in its own way defines criollo.

== History ==
According to the German philologist Ulrich Leo, literary criollismo arose in Venezuela at the end of the 19th century, although it will have to wait several decades to find general acceptance in Latin America. Luis Manuel Urbaneja Achelpohl was the first to use and define the term to refer to his own literature in an 1895 essay entitled "On National Literature", where he argues for "patriotic affairs" and the "tropical soul" denouncing a supposed servile cosmopolitanism: "We are here: today as yesterday we come to advocate for essentially American art (...) Come, my brothers, with the spontaneous flower of your intelligence. The future is assured for us."

== Notable examples ==
Notable criollista writers and works include: Luis Manuel Urbaneja Achepohl, Eduardo Blanco, Francisco Lazo Martí and Rómulo Gallegos's "Doña Bárbara" (1929) from Venezuela, José Eustasio Rivera's jungle novel "La vorágine" (1924) from Colombia; Horacio Quiroga (Uruguay), Ricardo Güiraldes, Benito Lynch (Argentina), Mario Augusto Rodriguez (Panama), and Manuel Gonzales Prada (Peru). In Chile, the criollismo movement shifted the cultural focus from urban life to rural life, and incorporated the rural world into the formation of the national identity. Some of the most representative Chilean criollista works are Baldomero Lillo's novels Sub Terra and Sub Sole, Mariano Latorre's novels Zurzulita and Cuna de cóndores (Cradle of Condors), Federico Gana's novel Días de campo (Countryside Days) and Antonio Acevedo Hernández's plays Árbol viejo and Chañarcillo.

== See also ==
- Costumbrismo
- Criollo people
- Literature of Latin America
- Venezuelan literature
- Chilean literature
- Música criolla
- Peruvian waltz
