= Allamand =

Allamand is a surname. It may refer to:

- Andrés Allamand (Zavala) (born 1956), Chilean politician
- Frédéric-Louis Allamand (1736–after 1803), Swiss botanist
- Ignacia Allamand (born 1981), Chilean actress
- Jean-Nicolas-Sébastien Allamand (c. 1713-1716–1787), Swiss-Dutch natural philosopher
- Jeanne-Charlotte Allamand (1760 – 1839), Swiss-born Canadian pioneer, educator and artist
- Maité Allamand (1911–1996), Chilean writer and diplomat
- Olivier Allamand (born 1969), French Olympian freestyle skier
