= Josefa de los Dolores Peña y Lillo Barbosa =

Chilean nun and writer

Sor Josefa de los Dolores Peña y Lillo Barbosa OP
- Born: Josefa de los Dolores Peña y Lillo Barbosa; 12 March 1739; Santiago de Chile, Captaincy General of Chile, Spanish Empire
- Died: 12 August 1823 (aged 84); Santiago de Chile, Chile
- Occupations: Nun, poet, writer
- Relatives: Ignacia Barbosa and Alonso de Peña y Lillo (parents)

Sister (Spanish: Sor) Josefa de los Dolores Peña y Lillo Barbosa, OP (also known as sor Josefa de los Dolores or sor Dolores Peña y Lillo, 12 March 1739 – 29 August 1823) was a Dominican nun and a self-taught writer of the Chilean Colonial period ascribed to Catholic confessional discourse produced by Indian nuns in South American cloisters during the fifteenth and seventeenth centuries. She cultivated the epistolary genre, but also rarely wrote poetry.

She entered the religious life in 1751 against her parents' wishes, and began her literary production in 1763 probably by own choice. She is considered today "the best existing sources for the study of the Spanish language that was spoken during the Chilean Colonial period" and the most reliable source for diachronic linguistics. Despite her humble origins, she achieved great influence in the political world of the nascent Republican Chile, especially within government ministers during the Independence, who consulted her regularly.

Alongside the autobiography of Ursula Suarez and collections of poems by Juana López and Tadea de San Joaquín, the epistolary production of Sister Josefa is included today within the first female literary records in Chile that identify and express themselves "in the literate territory of the city and culture of eighteenth-century Chilean colonial society". This is not to say that during that period there were no more written texts by nuns, but probably many of them are gone by authors' request.

== Biography ==
There are little biographical data available on Josefa de los Dolores, most of which are available in the monastery's records where she lived, some hagiographic publications, and her own confessional handwritten letters.

She was born on 25 March 1739; (Note: According to religious and historian Imelda Cano Roldán in 1981's La mujer en el Reyno de Chile, her date of birth would be 25 May 1739, although in Letter 6 sor Josefa indicated that her birthdate was 25 March.) and according to the clergyman and historian José Ignacio Eyzaguirre Portales, her parents were Ignacia Barbosa and Alonso Peña y Lillo, both of humble origin, who was sent her to "Beaterio Dominico de Santa Rosa de Lima"—latter named "Monasterio de Dominicas de Santa Rosa de Lima de Santiago de Chile"— aged seven, to pursue music studies. On 18 December 1751, aged 12, she decided to enter the convent as a postulant without her parents' permission, made a vow of perpetual chastity at 15 (Note: In Letter 6, sor Josefa mentioned that she made a vow of perpetual chastity before professing as a nun.) and on 15 October 1756, she made her formal profession as a white veil nun under the tutelage of the Prioress Maria Antonia Wandin, thereby becoming a fully recognized member of the religious community.

She lived in the monastery until her death in the first half of the 1820s: (Note: The Dominican Monastery of Santa Rosa de Lima in Santiago, Chile, reached such monastic rank in 1754, and its first prioress was Sister Laura Rosa Flores de la Oliva, cousin of Rose of Lima, T.O.S.D.) the historian Eyzaguirre in his 1850s "Historia eclesiástica, política y literaria de Chile, Tomo II" (Ecclesiastical, Political, and Literary History of Chile, Volume II) indicates that it was on 29 August 1823, while Raïssa Kordic, the editor of her work, indicates that she died on 27 August 1822, aged 83.

== Literary work ==
=== Historical context ===
Nuns' writings in colonial convents were a common practice in South American subcontinent, not only because it allowed to reinforce faith or because it was done "for confessional mandate", (Note: Nuns' writings were made by order of confessors and were later revised with «a watchful eye» to find «possible transgressions or to asseverate the orthodoxy of the written text».) but also because it allowed "to express some concerns or dissatisfactions against the lived reality" for including issues related to material and spiritual life that they had within the convent.

In this context, literary works by nuns were framed and developed in Chilean convents and monasteries during the colonial period until the 19th century; these included spiritual letters, diaries, autobiographies and epistolaries. Highlighted in these genres Tadea de San Joaquín, Úrsula Suárez and Josefa de los Dolores, whose works became the best known of its kind in the South American region, along with those of Capuchin Sister Maria Jacinta from cloister of Our Lady of the Pillar in Buenos Aires, possibly dating back to the 1820s.

=== Characteristics of her work ===
Her literary output was based on a series of epistolary letters sent to her confessor Manuel José Álvarez López (1701–1773) of the Society of Jesus—with whom the convent remained a close connection—probably in a period between 15 March 1763, and 7 March 1769, or such later date (as several letters contain no precise data).

In 1923, the existence of these manuscripts was first mentioned by the historian José Toribio Medina in History. Letters of women in Chile, 1630–1885 (Spanish: Historia. Cartas de mujeres en Chile, 1630–1885), but without a philological or linguistical point of view and with a short, imprecise descriptive character. Their rescue, analysis and publication started in the 2000s thanks to funding from the National Commission for Scientific and Technological Research, CONICYT.

==== Genre ====
According to its literary technique, tone, content or length, her literary work is considered part of the epistolary genre, and constitutes "the only so far known in Chile, of significant size, that remains whole", while the subgenre is the letter.

Several investigators "undearscore the letter's value as a 'technique' of confession, guided self-analysis, self-knowledge, self-development, and management of the cloistered nuns' inner life". In the case of Sister Josefa de los Dolores, such writings have enabled to know their discursive production, and have allowed to include her in the group of the first female literates in Chile.

==== Corpus ====
The letters were discovered in the archives of the monastery by the researcher and theorist Raïssa Kordic, who rescued over a hundred epistles "written in tiny italics, and developed in booklets of four to eight pages" that probably do not constitute all of her written work.

Such correspondence was held by the Jesuit priest Manuel Álvarez until his departure from Chile in unspecified date due to the expulsion of the Jesuits; (Note: Most Jesuits left Chile between 31 March and 2 April 1767, however, a few not sailed to Europe for advanced age or illness, including Father Manuel Álvarez.) those missives passed into the hands of the Bishop and his successors until 1861, when the Prioress of the time requested them: their content was partially censured and then were returned to the monastery. In the early 2000s, an academic group from the University of Chile began a rescue process.

Then in 2008, an edition containing 65 letters was published under the title of the "Epistolary of Sister Dolores Peña y Lillo (Chile, 1763–1769)" (Spanish: Epistolario de Sor Dolores Peña y Lillo (Chile, 1763–1769)) that included a critical analysis.

== Bibliography ==
- Araya Espinoza, Alejandra (July–December 2006a). "El castigo físico: el cuerpo como representación de la persona, un capítulo en la historia de la occidentalización de América, siglos XVI-XVIII" (PDF). Revista Historia (in Spanish). II (39): 349–367. doi:10.4067/S0717-71942006000200001. ISSN 0717-7194.
- Araya Espinoza, Alejandra (December 2006). "El cuerpo sufriente en la construcción del individuo moderno: El epistolario confesional de sor Josefa de los Dolores Peña y Lillo, monja del siglo XVIII". Finis Terrae (in Spanish). XIV (14): 80–93.
- Araya Espinoza, Alejandra (July–December 2010). "La mísita del corazón: una tradición de espiritualidad femenina en América colonial" (PDF). Cuadernos de Literatura (in Spanish). 14 (28): 132–155. ISSN 0122-8102. Archived from the original (PDF) on 22 February 2014.
- Araya Espinoza, Alejandra; Azúa Ríos, Ximena; Invernizzi, Lucía (2006). "El epistolario de Sor Josefa de los Dolores Peña y Lillo". In Lavrín, Asunción; Loreto L., Rosalva (eds.). Diálogos espirituales: manuscritos femeninos hispanoamericanos siglos XVI-XIX (in Spanish). Instituto de Ciencias Sociales y Humanidades de la Benemérita Universidad Autónoma de Puebla. p. 501. ISBN 978-96-8625-467-9.
- Azúa, Ximena (2007). "Abrir los cofres. La escritura como conocimiento de sí misma" (PDF). In Guardia, Sara Beatriz (ed.). Mujeres que escriben en América Latina (in Spanish). Centro de Estudios La Mujer en la Historia de América Latina, CEMHAL. ISBN 978-99-7292-646-4.
- Biblioteca Nacional de Chile (2013a). Memoria Chilena (ed.). "Epistolario de Sor Josefa". Escritura de Monjas en Chile (siglos XVI-XIX) (in Spanish). Dirección de Bibliotecas, Archivos y Museos.
- Biblioteca Nacional de Chile (2013b). Memoria chilena (ed.). "Escritura de Monjas en Chile (siglos XVI-XIX)" (in Spanish). Dirección de Bibliotecas, Archivos y Museos.
- Brañes, María José (2008). "Raïssa Kordic Riquelme. Epistolario de Sor Dolores Peña y Lillo (Chile, 1763–1769)" (PDF). Revista Onomázein (in Spanish). 18 (2): 175–179. doi:10.7764/onomazein.18.08. Archived from the original (PDF) on 22 February 2014.
- (Sor) Cano Roldán, Imelda (1981). La mujer en el Reyno de Chile (in Spanish). Empr. Ed. Gabriela Mistral. p. 680.
- Díaz, Mónica (2010). Indigenous Writings from the Convent: Negotiating Ethnic Autonomy in Colonial Mexico (in Spanish). University of Arizona Press. p. 229. ISBN 978-08-1652-853-0.
- Castro Buarque, Virginia A. (2007). "Mujeres consagradas y sus prácticas de escritura en Brasil". In Alves Pereira, Ronan (ed.). Ciencias Sociales y Religión en América Latina: Perspectivas en Debate (in Spanish). Editorial Biblos. p. 223. ISBN 978-95-0786-614-2.
- Cedomil, Goić (2006). Letras del Reino de Chile (in Spanish). Madrid: Iberoamericana Editorial. p. 332. ISBN 978-84-8489-254-0.
- Cohen Imach, Victoria (2004). "Escribir desde el claustro. Cartas personales de monjas" (PDF). Telar. Revista del Instituto Interdisciplinario de Estudios Latinoamericanos (in Spanish) (1): 38–51. Archived from the original (PDF) on 6 February 2012.
- Eyzaguirre, José Ignacio Víctor (1850). Historia eclesiástica, política y literaria de Chile, Tomo II (in Spanish). Valparaíso: Imprenta Europea, de Ezquerra y Gil. p. 406.
- Ferrús, Beatriz (2007). "Cuando la lectura se apodera del imaginario: tres escritoras latinoamericanas en el siglo de Cervantes". In Barchino, Matías (ed.). Territorios de La Mancha: versiones y subversiones cervantinas en la literatura hispanoamericana. Actas del VI Congreso Internacional de la Asociación Española de Estudios Literarios Hispanoamericanos (in Spanish). Universidad de Castilla La Mancha. p. 808. ISBN 978-848-427-475-9.
- Ferrús, Beatriz (2004). Discursos cautivos: convento, vida, escritura (in Spanish). Valencia: Universitat de València. p. 135. ISBN 978-843-705-829-0.
- Invernizzi Santa Cruz, Lucía (2003). "El discurso confesional en Epistolario de Sor Josefa de los Dolores Peña y Lillo (siglo XVIII)" (PDF). Revista Historia (in Spanish) (36): 179–190.
- Invernizzi Santa Cruz, Lucía (April 2006). "La "bodega del amor" y la tradición mística en un texto chileno del siglo XVIII". Revista Chilena de Literatura (in Spanish) (68). doi:10.4067/s0718-22952006000100001. hdl:10533/177433. ISSN 0718-2295.
- Jara, Lucrecia (1979). Guía de la Iglesia en Chile, 1979 (in Spanish). Ediciones Mundo. p. 640.
- Kordic Riquelme, Raïssa (Winter 2001). "Sor Dolores Peña y Lillo: un esbozo filológico". Cyber Humanitatis (in Spanish) (19). ISSN 0717-2869.
- Kordic Riquelme, Raïssa (Winter 2002–2003). "De dolamas y crujías: edición crítica de una carta de sor Dolores Peña y Lillo". Boletín de Filología de la Universidad de Chile – BFUCh (in Spanish) (39): 81–101. ISSN 0718-9303.
- Kordic Riquelme, Raïssa (2004). "Poemas de Sor Dolores Peña y Lillo y edición crítica del Epistolario" (PDF). Anales de Literatura Chilena (in Spanish). 5 (5): 229–231. ISSN 0717-6058. Archived from the original (PDF) on 22 February 2014.
- Kordic Riquelme, Raïssa (2008). "Introducción". In Kordic Riquelme, Raïssa (ed.). Epistolario de Sor Dolores Peña y Lillo (Chile, 1763–1769) (in Spanish). Iberoamericana Editorial. p. 518. ISBN 978-84-8489-328-8.
- Kordic Riquelme, Raïssa (2007). "Chile colonial. Filología e Historia: Las cartas de Sor Dolores Peña y Lillo" (PDF). Artes y Letras (in Spanish). El Mercurio, edición del 3 de junio de 2007. Iberoamericana Editorial. Archived from the original (PDF) on 22 February 2014.
- Lavrin, Asunción (1995). "De su puño y letra: epístolas conventuales" (PDF). In Ramos Medina, Manuel (ed.). En Memoria del II Congreso Internacional "El Monacato Femenino en el Imperio Español, Monasterios, beaterios, recogimientos y colegios" (in Spanish). México: Centro de Estudios de Historia de México. pp. 43–61.
- Lavrin, Asunción; Chang-Rodríguez, Raquel (1996). "La celda y el convento: una perspectiva femenina". In Garza Cuarón, Beatriz (ed.). Historia de la literatura mexicana: La cultura letrada en la Nueva España del siglo XVII (in Spanish). México: Siglo XXI. p. 744. ISBN 978-968-232-404-8.
- López Taverne, Elvira (17 December 2008). "Raïssa Kordic Riquelme, Epistolario de Sor Dolores Peña y Lillo (Chile, 1763-1769), Madrid, Editorial Iberoamericana, 2008, 518 p. Colección Biblioteca Indiana, 9". Nuevo Mundo Mundos Nuevos [En Línea], Reseñas y Ensayos Historiográficos (in Spanish). ISSN 1626-0252.
- (Sor) Meza, Rosa (1923). Recuerdos históricos. Monasterio de Santa Rosa de Lima (in Spanish). Imprenta Lagunas y Co.
- Millar Carvacho, Rene (January–June 2009). "Reseña: Epistolario de Sor Dolores Peña y Lillo (Chile, 1763–1769). Prólogo y edición crítica de Raïssa Kordic Riquelme" (PDF). Historia (in Spanish). 1 (42): 255–258. doi:10.4067/S0717-71942009000100013. ISSN 0073-2435.
- Montecino Aguirre, Sonia (2008). Mujeres chilenas: fragmentos de una historia (in Spanish). Editorial Catalonia. p. 625. ISBN 978-95-6830-385-3.
- Navarrete, Carolina A. (2008). "Reseña: Raïssa Kordic, Epistolario de Sor Dolores Peña y Lillo (Chile, 1763-1769)" (PDF). Anales de Literatura Chilena (in Spanish) (10): 213–216. ISSN 0073-2435. Archived from the original (PDF) on 22 February 2014.
- Sor Dolores Peña y Lillo (2008). "Epistolario de Sor Dolores Peña y Lillo (edición crítica de los textos)". In Kordic Riquelme, Raïssa (ed.). Epistolario de Sor Dolores Peña y Lillo (Chile, 1763–1769) (in Spanish). Iberoamericana Editorial. p. 518. ISBN 978-84-8489-328-8.
- Urrejola, Bernarda (2004). "No tendría yo que sentir: el Epistolario de sor Josefa de los Dolores Peña y Lillo". In Hintze, Gloria (ed.). Escritura femenina: diversidad y género en América Latina (in Spanish). Universidad Nacional de Cuyo, Facultad de Filsofía y Letras. p. 232.
- Urrejola, Bernarda (2006). ""Carísimo padre mío y toda mi estimación en nuestro Señor": obstinación y afecto por el confesor en el epistolario de Josefa de los Dolores Peñailillo (Chile, s. XVIII)" (PDF). Atenea (in Spanish) (494): 67–82. doi:10.4067/S0718-04622006000200005. ISSN 0716-1840.
- Urrejola, Bernarda (2008). "Debemos cre[e]r que a los señores sa[c]erdotes los alumbra Dios": crítica velada a los confesores en dos religiosas chilenas, Úrsula Suárez y Dolores Peña y Lillo (siglo XVIII)". Revista de Crítica Literaria Latinoamericana (in Spanish). 34 (67): 169–188.
- Urrejola, Bernarda (2009a). "Con el confesionario dentro: la confesión de las religiosas en los siglos coloniales". In Casazza, Roberto; Storti, Javier; Casasbellas Alconada, Lucía; Míguez, Gustavo Ignacio (eds.). Artes, ciencias y letras en América colonial – Tomo 1, Volumen 1 (in Spanish). Teseo. p. 316. ISBN 978-98-7135-442-9.
- Urrejola, Bernarda (2009b). "Epistolario de sor Dolores Peña y Lillo (Chile, 1763–1769)" (PDF). Fronteras de la Historia (in Spanish). 14 (2): 393–395. Archived from the original (PDF) on 22 February 2014.
