= Zorobabel Rodríguez =

Zorobabel Rodríguez may refer to:

- Zorobabel Rodríguez (writer) (1849–1901), Chilean lawyer, politician, writer and journalist
- Zorobabel Rodríguez (boxer) (born 1902), Chilean boxer
