= Daniel Riquelme =

Chilean writer, journalist and chronicler

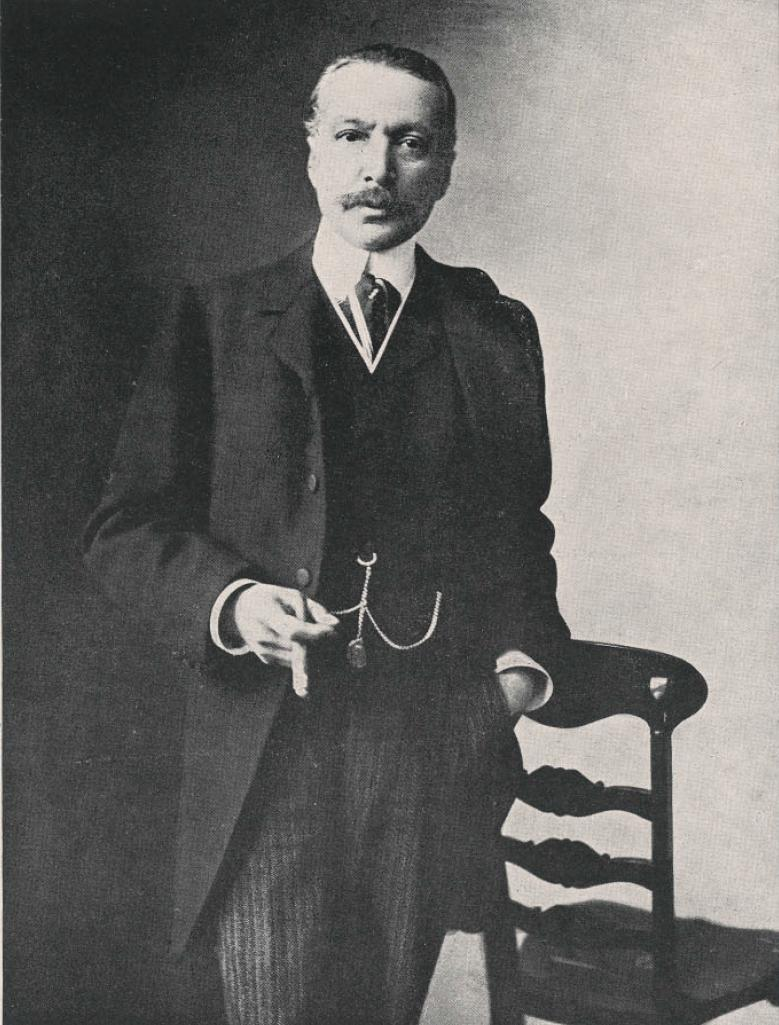
Daniel Riquelme

Daniel Riquelme García (Santiago, Chile, 1857– Lausanne, Switzerland, 1912) was a writer, journalist and chronicler of Chile.

== Biography ==
He was a son of Jose Riquelme Orozco, the first Chilean stenographer, and Bruna Garcia Venegas, a professor of music. He was the younger brother of Ernesto Riquelme. In 1865, his father died and his mother took over his education. He studied at the National Institute of Santiago, then law at the University of Chile, although he subsequently abandoned his studies.

He began as a writer on various topics in Santiago magazines, and then devoted himself to journalism. In 1876 he entered public service, serving as auxiliary official of the Ministry of Finance under the government of President Aníbal Pinto. As public functionary he was part of an integrated civilian entourage that accompanied the Chilean Army during the War of the Pacific, and he used his stay at the war front to work as a correspondent for El Heraldo of Valparaíso, a newspaper that published his articles from November 1880 until June 1881.

In 1885 he published Military Chascarillos, or Military Jokes, which recounted his experiences at the front, dealing with topics such as jokes, table manners and various stories. The book was edited, enhanced and then republished in the work that made him most famous, Under the tent (1888).

From 1887 to 1891, Riqueme wrote stories, chronicles and articles under the pseudonym with which he popularly became known: Innocent Conchalí. During this period his works included his urban portraits of bohemian Santiago in the late nineteenth century, in particular around the Orphans, Merced and Recoleta streets, where he spent much of his life. His writings combined nascent modernism techniques with the metaphors and sayings drawn from the local Creole. This contributed to Chilean prose of the nineteenth century, and was adopted by later writers including Baldomero Lillo and Olegario Lazo Baeza.

After the fall of President José Manuel Balmaceda, Riquelme continued to work as a writer periodically, but abandoned his light and adorned style of writing to instead engage in works on various historical events, a task that continued during his years at the El Mercurio of Santiago until 1911.

Sick with tuberculosis, Riqueme traveled to Paris and then moved to Switzerland. He died in Lausanne in 1912, and his remains were interred there until 1942, when they were thrown into a common grave. At present, the precise location of his remains is unknown.

== Work ==
In addition to his work on the War of the Pacific, Riquelme portrayed the political and social life of Santiago in the late nineteenth century through articles on folklore, chronicles of the day, and various tales and short stories. In the latter stage of his career as an author, he wrote extensively on history, and he proposed a rereading of some of the foundational accounts of Chile.

- Military Chascarillos (1885)
- Under The Tent (1888)
- The Revolution of April 20, 1851 (1893)
- The Church of the Company Fire: December 8, 1863 (1893)
- Compendium of the History of Chile (1899)
- The earthquake Mr. May (1905)

== See also ==
- Chilean literature
