= Carmen de Alonso =

Chilean author

- Born: Carmen Margarita Carrasco Barrios; 1909; La Serena, Chile
- Died: 1993 (aged 83–84)
- Occupation: Author

Carmen de Alonso (1909–1993) was the pseudonym of Carmen Margarita Carrasco Barrios, a Chilean author.

== Biography ==
Carmen Margarita Carrasco Barrios was born in La Serena. She studied in Ovalle and Santiago and was awarded the title of Profesora normalista. She worked as a teacher in Santiago and held several positions at the Biblioteca Nacional.

She began to have success publishing short stories, and was a prolific contributor to newspapers and magazines, including the journal Atenea and her own column "Al Pasar" in the magazine Margarita. In the 1950s she became well known for her children's story collections Medallones de sol and Medallones de luna. In 1957 her story "La puebla" (later included in the 1962 collection La cita and many other anthologies) won the Mariano Latorre Prize for Folktales. In the early 1960s her anthologies Érase una amapolita and La casita de cristal were also popular.

Many of her stories were folktales set in Chile's northern region and touched on conditions of poverty, violence, and injustice. Alonso was recognized as one of the country's most distinguished writers about rural life, and her stories were collected in many books.

== Works ==
=== Novels ===
- Anclas en la ciudad (1941)

=== Short story collections ===
- Gleba (1936)
- Provena (1938)
- Y había luz de estrellas (1950)
- La cita (1962)

=== Children's story collections ===
- Medallones de sol (1955)
- Medallones de luna (1956)
- Cantaritos (Leyendas americanas) (1958)
- Érase una amapolita: Nuevas leyendas americanas (1962)
- La casita de cristal (1962)
