= Inés de Guerrico Eguses =

Inés de Guerrico Eguses, better known as Sor María Jacinta (Sister Maria Jacinta) (1793–1840), was a Capuchin nun and writer from the nascent republican Argentina attached to the confessional discourse of nuns present in the cloisters of South America between the seventeenth and nineteenth centuries. Sister Maria Jacinta's literary output was based on a series of epistolary letters, which, when combined with that of the Chilean Sister Josefa de los Dolores Peña y Lillo Barbosa, are the best known of their kind in South America.

== Biography ==
Inés de Guerrico Eguses was born in Buenos Aires, Viceroyalty of the Río de la Plata, 1793. There are few biographical antecedents of Sister María Jacinta, most of which are available in chronicles of the monastery where she lived and the handwritten letters that she wrote at the beginning of the 19th century. Her parents were Don José de Guerrico and Doña María Micaela Eguses. She belonged to the Order of Capuchin Poor Clares of the cloister of Nuestra Señora del Pilar in Buenos Aires, which she entered on April 14, 1818. In 1819, she was ordained a nun with a black veil.

== Literary work ==
The writing by nuns in the convents of the colonial period and until the 19th century was a common practice in the South American continent, not only because it allowed reinforcing the faith or because it was given a sacramental logic, but also because it allowed "expression of some concern or some dissatisfaction with the reality experienced". In this context is framed the literary work carried out by the nuns in the lodgings and convents of the continent between the seventeenth and nineteenth centuries, who mainly wrote spiritual letters, diaries, autobiographies, and epistolary genre. In this way, the writings of Sister María Jacinta stood out, which, together with those of the Chilean Sister Josefa de los Dolores Peña y Lillo Barbosa, would be the best known of their kind in South America.

Sister Maria Jacinta's writings are based on a series of five epistolary letters sent to José Miguel de Tagle -for which there is no consensus as to whether there was a relationship or not- that probably date back to the 1820s, although their date is not certain.

She died in 1840 in Buenos Aires, Argentine Confederation.
