= Federico Gana =

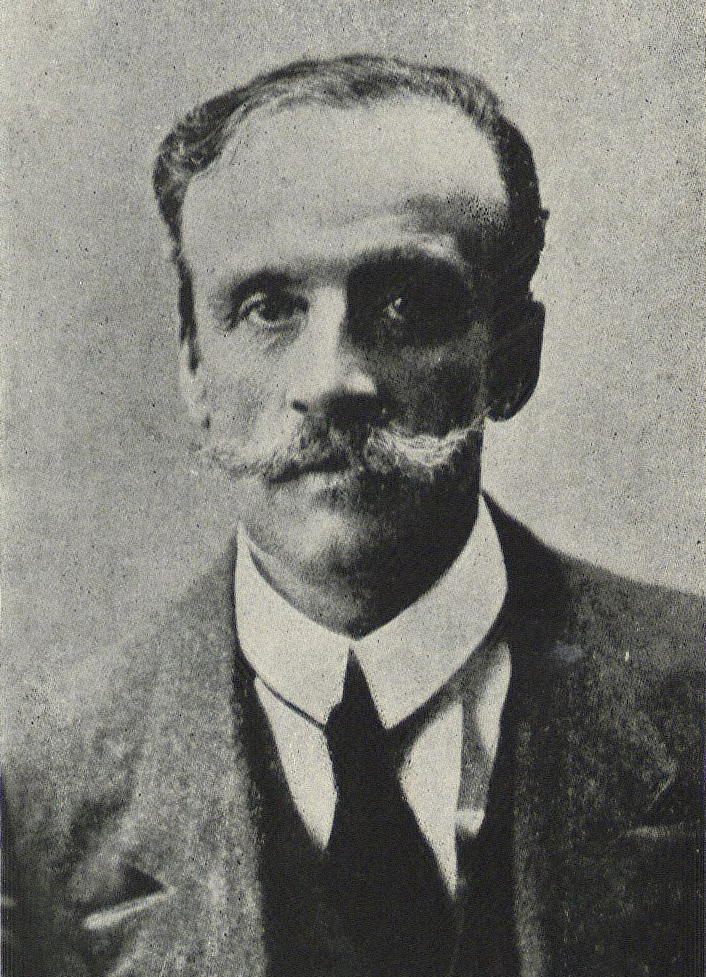
Gana in 1920

Federico Gana (January 15, 1867 – April 22, 1926) was a Chilean writer and diplomat from Santiago, Chile.

== Biography ==
Federico Gana was the eldest son of Federico Gana Munizaga Rosario Gana Castro, and distantly related to Albero Blest Gana, the preeminent Chilean novelist. He began his secondary education in the Linares Lyceum in 1878 spending his first year there, only to later move to complete his education at the National Institute. He obtained his law degree from the University of Chile in 1890 but practiced law only for a short period of time.

He lived primarily in Santiago and San Bernardo. In October 1890, his first published work, the short story "¡Pobre vieja!", appeared in the weekly La Actualidad, under the pseudonym Pedro Simple. At the end of that year, Gana was named second secretary of the Chilean legation to London, a charge that ended with the fall of the Balmaceda government.

Freed from his diplomatic work, he traveled to France, Belgium, and Holland, where he came into contact with the works of Flaubert, Balzac, and Ivan Turgenev, the lattermost impressing him profoundly. Upon his return to Chile, in 1892, he disseminated the works of the Russian novelist throughout literary circles.

In 1894, Gana published another short story, this time in publication El año Literario, that was initially titled "Por un perro", but later came to be called "Un carácter". In July 1897, La Revista Literaria published the story "Una mañana de invierno" (later known as "La Maiga"), with which Gana began the spread of criollismo.

In 1903, he married Blanca Subercaseux del Río, with whom he had six children. The same year he and his friend Baldomero Lillo participated in a literary competition organized by the Catholic Review. They submitted the stories "La Señora", "En las montañas", and "La Maiga". He also began contributing to the literary magazine Zig-Zag in 1906, publishing his "Manchas de Color" in 1914.

A great number of his works circulated in a diverse array of newspapers, including La Revista Nueva, Sucesos, Silueta Magazine, El Mercurio, La Nación, Atenea, and Las Últimas Noticias.

Following a brief hospitalization in San Vincente's Hospital in Santiago, he died in 1926.

== Literary analysis ==
Studies of the character and evolution of the Chilean short story have established categorically that Federico Gana is the authentic discoverer of the Chilean countryside as a theme of national literature.

Coming from the modernista environment prevalent at the end of the 19th century, his early stories reveal a natural vacillation between the subjective and fleeting tendencies that inspired modernism, along with the utilization of the concrete motives offered by the natural environment of the countryside. In this manner with his first published story in 1890, "¡Pobre vieja!", he subtly reveals his interest in vernacular literary elements; the same occurs with "Por un perro", in 1894. It is in this same year that he wrote "En otro tiempo" (later known as "Pesadillas"), in which he adopts an extremely modernist tone.

In 1897, he published The Maiga, with the name of "Días de campo: Una mañana de invierno", a story which shows his definitive association with the movement of criollismo. The date serves well as a potential point of departure for this movement, as at many stories based in the movement enjoyed representation in the works of the nation and within the literature of Latin America as whole.

Yet this first rapprochement of the Chilean countryside (which Gana experienced firsthand during his childhood summer vacations to the country near and around Linares) does not reveal the depth and concern of Baldomero Lillo and other subsequent criollistas. Instead Ferderico Gana was heavily influenced by the works of Turgenev, with whom he shared an aesthetic similitude. This in turn gave Gana a creative attitude that reflected a style that was rather dignified and clean that coupled will with a tendency of gentle reverie. This harmony allowed Gana's writing to capture a serene and intimate vision of the Chilean countryside not typically shown in writing during his time. he placed a strong emphasis on the patriarchal aspect of the countryside, with its peasants and elderly that were full of resignation and reverential respect for authority.

"La señora" and "Paulita" can be seen as a two stories that most encapsulate the ideas and writing style of Gana, as they reflect many of the virtues that are often characterized in his narrative and poetic work.
