= Revista Chilena de Literatura =

- Discipline: Literature
- Language: Spanish

Publication details
- History: 1970–present
- Publisher: University of Chile (Chile)
- Frequency: Biannually

Standard abbreviations
- ISO 4: Rev. Chil. Lit.

Indexing
- ISSN: 0718-2295
- Journal page at SciELO

Revista Chilena de Literatura is an academic journal about literature published by the University of Chile. The journal appeared first in 1970 and is currently a semiannual journal.
