= Hernán Ramírez Necochea =

Chilean historian

- Born: 27 March 1917; Valparaíso, Chile
- Died: 21 October 1979 (aged 62); Paris, France
- Scientific career
- Fields: History of Chile, Marxist historiography

Hernán Ramírez Necochea (1917–1979) was a Chilean Marxist historian. In 1968 he became director of the faculty of Philosophy and Education in the University of Chile. Following the 1973 Chilean coup d'etat he went to exile in Paris, France where he lectured in the Paris-Sorbonne University.
