= Jorge Inostrosa Cuevas =

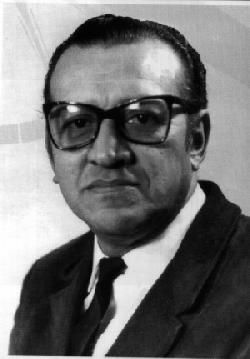
- Born: 30 March 1919; Iquique, Chile
- Died: 5 January 1975 (aged 55); Santiago, Chile
- Education: Internado Nacional Barros Arana
- Occupation: Writer
- Notable work: Adiós al Séptimo de Línea
- Spouse: Violeta Wood Ríos

Jorge Inostrosa Cuevas (30 March 1919 – 5 January 1975) was a Chilean novelist, biographer, journalist, and screenwriter for radio, theater, and television. By his own account, "he lived to write and for what he gained from writing." Upon his death, he had more than 30 titles under his belt, as well as lyrics, poems, and a significant number of scripts for film, radio, and television.

== Family life and studies ==
Jorge Inostrosa Cuevas was the son of a lawyer and a history teacher, concert pianist, and poet. His father died when he was thirteen years old and, with his mother and five brothers, he settled in Santiago, where he worked to pay for his schooling. He attended Internado Nacional Barros Arana, and later studied for a degree in pedagogy of history which he did not complete.

He was an agnostic, a Carrerino, and a boxing lover. In the late 1930s, he met Violeta Wood in San Bernardo, whom he married. The couple had two daughters, Verónica and Francisca Javiera.

He was appointed cultural attaché in the governments of Eduardo Frei Montalva and Augusto Pinochet. He died of a stroke in Santiago on 5 January 1975.

== Radio and television career ==
Although he served as a university professor, for more than a quarter of a century Inostrosa Cuevas worked in radio, and his programs were broadcast by the BBC. He was a director of radio shows in Chile and Argentina. In the latter country, he was an editor in the radio department of Sydney Ross, where the radio drama was born, and worked with Hugo del Carril, whom he historically advised for his 1955 film La Quintrala. He also was an editor for television programs in Argentina and Colombia. He traveled throughout Latin America to soak up the character of places which he later evoked in his writings.

At Radio Nacional de Chile, he created and broadcast El gran teatro de la historia with a company of actors who, under his direction and with his scripts, gave life to episodes from the history of Chile and to heroes in his radio plays. On that station in 1948, he premiered his work Adiós al Séptimo de Línea, one of the most successful Chilean radio programs. Later, it was adapted into a novel of the same name and inspired a comic by Isidro Arteaga in 1960, a musical piece, the album Al Séptimo de Línea by the group Los Cuatro Cuartos in 1966, and a TV series in 2010.

== Literary career ==
Inostrosa Cuevas dictated his books and even his radio scripts, which went on the air almost without corrections. In the early 1950s, he adapted his scripts into books. In 1955 he published his best-known work, Adiós al Séptimo de Línea, a novel in five parts – La frontera en llamas, Las cruces del desierto, Los infantes de bronce, Los batallones olvidados, and El regreso de los inmortales – based on the script for the radio drama that had been broadcast with great success in the late 1940s. As El Mercurio pointed out after his death, this novel sold "more than five million copies, [constituting] one of the greatest bestsellers of the country's literary history." Various media outlets have estimated the total number of copies sold between five and seven million.

== Selected works ==
- Adiós al Séptimo de Línea (5 volumes), 1955
- Bajo las banderas del Libertador (3 volumes), 1959
- Hidalgos del mar, Prat y Grau, 1959
- El corregidor de Cal y Canto, 1960
- La justicia de los Maurelio, 1961
- El rescatado por Dios, 1962
- Fantasmas y retratos de la tradición, 1963
- Los húsares trágicos (4 volumes), 1965
- Huella de siglos, 1966
- Se las echó el Buin, 1970
- Siempre una mujer, 1974
- El ministro Portales, 1976 (posthumous)
