= Liborio Brieba =

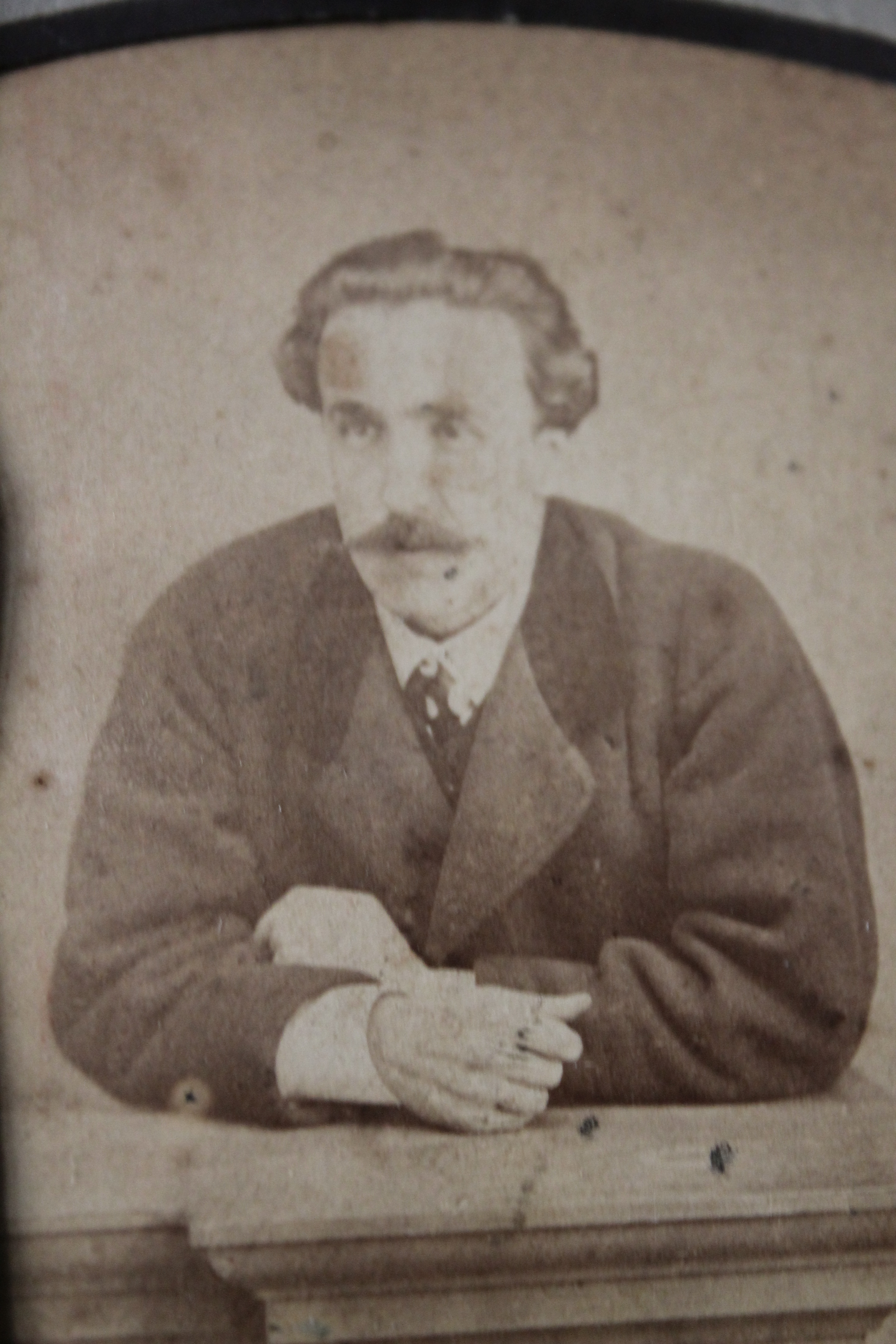

Liborio Brieba Pacheco (1841 - 1897) was a Chilean writer, schoolteacher, journalist and engineer born in Valparaíso.

He is mostly remembered as the author of two historical novels, that were extremely successful when serialized in the literary magazine La Estrella de Chile of Santiago: Los Talaveras (The Talaveras in 1871) and El capitán San Bruno (Captain San Bruno in 1875). In these very long novels (the second is over 1200 pages), the action takes place in the historical period known as the Reconquista, between the years 1814 and 1817. Both were subsequently published together under the title Episodios Nacionales (National vignettes.)

As a journalist, he worked in several newspapers, such as El Heraldo y Las Novedades. He is also the author of several other historical novels, mostly based on the Chilean War of Independence, and some novels based on the supernatural. All of them were serialized in the press of the time. He signed his supernatural novels with the pseudonym Mefistofeles.

He also worked as an engineer, and as such he was responsible for the first public elevator in the city of Valparaíso, the Concepción, which opened in 1883. As such he is considered the local inventor of these very typical means of public transport. Nonetheless, when the first one opened, the public, knowing that Brieba had published several novels with "witchcraft" themes, feared that the elevators were cursed, so it took a public campaign to convince them of their utility. He also was in charge of the design of the city of Villa Alemana and of the El Paraíso neighborhood in Valparaíso.

He was also a schoolteacher and school inspector. Presidente José Manuel Balmaceda named him as Superintendent of Public Schools, but he was dismissed after the 1891 Chilean Civil War. He died in the port of Valparaíso in 1897.

== Works ==
=== Historical novels ===
- Los Talaveras
- El capitán San Bruno
- Las prisiones de Juan Fernández
- Manuel Rodríguez
- Los favoritos de Marcó del Pont
- Los guerrilleros insurgentes
- Chacabuco y la libertad de Chile
- Entre las nieves

=== Supernatural novels ===
- Las camisas de Lucifer
- Los anteojos de Satanás
- El profesor de crímenes
