= Maité Allamand =

Chilean writer and diplomat

- Born: Jeanne Dominique Marie Therese Allamand Madaune; 29 October 1911; Santiago, Chile
- Died: 3 January 1996 (aged 84); Santiago, Chile
- Occupations: Writer, diplomat
- Years active: 1933–1994
- Movement: Neocriollismo
- Spouse: Luis Hervé
- Awards: 1962 Municipal Prize of Santiago; 1969 IBBY CRAV prize

Maité Allamand (29 October 1911 – 3 January 1996) was a Chilean writer and diplomat. Born Jeanne Dominique Marie Therese Allamand Madaune to a French family based in Chile, she was an influential figure in the early development of children's literature in that country. She was the director of the PEN Club and a member of the International Board on Books for Young People (IBBY). She received several awards, including the 1962 Municipal Prize of Santiago in the short story category and the 1969 IBBY CRAV prize.

== Biography ==
Maité Allamand spent her childhood in the countryside on the banks of the Maule River, after her father's job transferred him there. This rural environment influenced her later work. In 1920 she enrolled in the Sacred Heart College of Talca, where she learned to speak and read Spanish.

After finishing her education, Allamand worked in the legation to Belgium, thanks to her mastery of French. She remained in this position from 1932 until 1940, when she married the doctor and researcher Luis Hervé.

== Select bibliography ==
- 1933 - Cosas de campo
- 1936 - Parvas viejas
- 1944 - Renovales
- 1950 - Alamito el Largo
- 1960 - El funeral del diablo
- 1966 - Huellas en la ciudad
- 1969 - El sueño y la lumbre
- 1974 - La niña de las trenzas de lana
- 1991 - Cerrín que quería crecer
- 1993 - El buzón colorado
