= Hernán Neira =

Chilean writer (born 1960)

Hernán Neira (Lima, Perú, 1960) is a Chilean writer, philosopher and university professor.

== Education ==
He attended in Chile to Colegio San Ignacio in Santiago de Chile. His family moved to Spain in 1971, where he attended to Colegio San Patricio and Instituto Cardenal Cisneros. In January 1984 he received his undergraduate degree in philosophy from the Catholic University in Santiago de Chile, where he also directed Perspectivas, a student magazine opposed to the dictatorship of general Pinochet. In 1985 he moved to Paris, where he studied philosophy at the Paris VIII University. He also studied sociology and linguistics at the l'École de hautes etudes en sciences sociales, Paris. In 1992 returned to Chile.

== Career ==
His first post was in Universidad de La Serena (1984–1985), Chile. In Paris he taught at the Institut d'études politiques, Paris (1991–1992), and again in Chile in Universidad Austral (1993–2007). He has invited to teach at the University of Chile, Diego Portales, Los Lagos, La Frontera and Universidad Nacional Andrés Bello. Hernán Neira has also given several conferences in Europe. Since 2008 he is professor of political philosophy at Universidad de Santiago de Chile. In 2011 he was elected to the Academic Counsel of this university.

He has become one of the outstanding Chilean literary voices, gradually becoming a cult writer. In 2005, Mathieu Lindon wrote about him in the French paper Libération: “There is, dans Les naufragés (French translation of El naufragio de la luz), not properly an atmosphere and tone, but a strategy of rising malaise, which reminds both Julian Grack and Marie NDiaye”, and the Swiss paper “La Tribune de Genève” compared him with Joseph Conrad. In 2004 Hernán Neirawas interviewed by the Chilean paper El Mostrador, considered himself as “outsider”. His first short-stories book, A golpes de hacha y fuego (By blows of axe and fire, Editorial Andrés Bello Santiago, 1995) was unanimously welcome.

As a philosopher, his main research areas are political philosophy, animal ethics and literary aesthetics.

He has published scientific articles in Chile, the United States, Spain, the Netherlands and Cuba, and has received six times the support of the National Found for Science and Technology (Fondecyt). He is currently leading a research on political aspects of philosophical and political suicide.

He published two novels, El sueño inconcluso (The unended dream) (Editorial Planeta, Santiago, 1999) and El naufragio de la luz (The shipwreck of the light) (Ediciones B, Barcelona, 2004). He has also published compilations of essays in El espejo del olvido (The mirror of forgetfulness) (Dolmen Ediciones, Santiago, 1997), and La ciudad y las palabras (The city and words) (Editorial Universitaria, Santiago, 2004). In addition, he has collaborated with the newspapers El Mercurio (Chile) and El País (Spain), and with the magazines Ecos de España y Latinoamérica (Germany), and The International Literary Quarterly, New York.

In 2003, the novel El naufragio de la luz (The shipwreck of the light) won unanimously the Dos Orillas award, given by four European publishing houses, that have translated his novel into French, Portuguese and Greek.

His narrative Almuerzos de verano (Summer Lunches) received the award of the Fondo Nacional del Libro y de la Lectura (2018) and has been recently published by the International Literary Quarterly.

== Work ==
=== Novels ===
- El sueño inconcluso (Editorial Planeta, Santiago de Chile 1999)
- El naufragio de la luz (Ediciones B, Barcelona 2004, ISBN 8466614591)

=== Short stories books ===
- A golpes de hacha y fuego, cuentos, Editorial Andrés Bello, 1995. ISBN 978956131296-8.
- Los viajes del argonauta. Ediciones Mar del Plata. Santiago de Chile, 1985.

=== Other stories ===
- Un hombre en casa. Extract from Almuerzos de verano. In "The International Literary Quarterly", 2020.

=== Theater ===
- Neira, Hernán. "Una modesta proposición" (PDF).

=== Philosophical books ===
- El espejo del olvido. Dolmen Ediciones, Santiago 1997.
- La ciudad y las palabras. Editorial Universitaria. Santiago de Chile 2004.
- Visión de los vencidos. La idea de América en las Memorias de Juan Bautista Tupac Amaru. Editorial Universidad de Santiago de Chile, Santiago 2009.
- Leituras contemporâneas da modernidade. Editora Universidade Federal do Paraná, Curitiba (Brasil) 2013.
- O individuo inquietante. Sob o signo de Lope de Aguirre. Editora Universidade Federal do Paraná, Curitiba (Brasil) 2013. ISBN 9788565888332
- Olhares de América. Editora Universidade Federal do Paraná, Curitiba (Brasil) 2013. ISBN 9788565888325

=== Philosophical articles ===
- Ecological Climax as Policy Goal for Environmental Restoration: The Case of Parque Pumalín and Intentional Management for Ecosystem and Human Health. ENVIRONMENTAL ETHICS. 2020. En prensa.
- Neira, Hernán; Russo, Lorena Inés; Subiabre, Bernardita Álvarez (27 December 2019). "Ecocidio". Revista de Filosofía. 76: 127–148. doi:10.4067/S0718-43602019000200127.
- Neira, Hernán (2019). "Temps et moralité chez les animaux". Revue de métaphysique et de morale. 101 (1): 11–23. doi:10.3917/rmm.191.0011. S2CID 171783421.
- Barrera, Hernán Neira (15 June 2019). "Reconocimiento y rizoma: Mutatis Mutandis en la escena filosófica". Mutatis Mutandis: Revista Internacional de Filosofía. 1 (12): 7–9.
- Neira, Hernán (26 December 2018). "Filósofos extranjeros y tradición americana". Mutatis Mutandis: Revista Internacional de Filosofía. 1 (11): 7–12.
- Neira, Hernán (October 2018). "Ciudadanía, propiedad y derechos animales". Revista Direito e Práxis. 9 (4): 2402–2421. doi:10.1590/2179-8966/2018/37908.
- Neira, Hernan (September 2018). "Suicidio y misiones suicidas: revisitando a Durkheim". Cinta de Moebio (62): 140–154. doi:10.4067/S0717-554X2018000200140. hdl:10533/228254.
- Neira, Hernán (October 2017). "La difícil distinción entre humanos y animales". Revista de Filosofía. 73: 161–178. doi:10.4067/S0718-43602017000100161.
- Epistemología de los animales. Capítulo en el libro electrónico Es tiempo de coexistir. Perspectivas, debates y otras provocaciones en torno a los animales no humanos. Editorial Latinoamericana de Estudios Críticos Animales. La Plata, Argentina. 2017, pp. 194–204. ISBN 978-987-46680-0-4.
- Neira, Hernán (1 May 2017). "Suicidio soberano y suicidio patológico". Ideas y Valores. 66 (164): 151–179. doi:10.15446/ideasyvalores.v66n164.45177.
- Clasificación, comunidad y soberanía: más allá de la fundamentación individualista de los derechos de los animales. Revista FILOSOFIA UNISINOS. Vol 17, N.2, 2016, pp. 271–282. WoS/Scopus
- Neira, Hernán (23 August 2016). "Pudor y secreto animal". Revista Latinoamericana de Estudios Críticos Animales.
- Neira, Hernán; Fierro, Juan Manuel (1 December 2014). "Enésimo viaje a Eldorado del Teatro Guirigai: renovación del teatro callejero en una contrautopía colonial". Bulletin Hispanique (116–2): 833–854. doi:10.4000/bulletinhispanique.3599.
- Neira, Hernán (June 2014). "Política y vida animal: la analogía del buen gobierno" [Politics and animal life: the analogy of the good government]. Scientiae Studia (in Spanish). 12 (2): 261–284. doi:10.1590/S1678-31662014000200003.
- Neira, Hernán; Aurenque, Diana (2 May 2014). "¿Pobres y Ricos de Mundo? Repensando la Noción Heideggeriana de la Animalidad". Revista de Filosofía Aurora. 26 (38): 315. doi:10.7213/aurora.26.038.ao.08.
- Neira, Hernán (6 January 2014). "El impenetrable corazón animal: Descartes y Condillac ante los animales". Filosofia Unisinos. 14 (3): 226–241. doi:10.4013/fsu.2013.143.05.
- América ante las puertas de la historia. The International Literary Quarterly #19, August 2013. Nueva York.
- Neira, Hernán (March 2013). "La Modesta Proposición Biopolítica de Jonathan Swift". Cinta de Moebio (46): 47–58. doi:10.4067/S0717-554X2013000100005.
- Ciclovías: testimonio de la ausencia de un plan integral de transporte para Valdivia. REVISTA AUSTRAL DE CIENCIAS SOCIALES, 23: 133–140, 2012. ISI/Scopus.
- La mirada de Chile. Espacio Regional. Revista de Estudios Sociales, ISSN 0718-1604, 1, Nº 7, 2010, págs. 39–45. Reimpreso con correcciones en Filósofos chilenos y el Bicentenario. Editorial Chancacazo, Santiago de Chile, 2012. ISBN 978-956-8940-26-3; y enThe International Literary Quarterly, #12, 2010).
- Neira, Hernán (2012). "Derecho internacional y derecho civil: una teoría de acción comunicativa para difundir el evangelio" [International law and civil law: a theory of communicative action to spread the gospel]. Teología y vida (in Spanish). 53 (4): 521–545. doi:10.4067/S0049-34492012000300005.
- La idea de origen en el concepto de América. (versión corregida del articulo publicado en revista ARAUCARIA DE CHILE, Madrid 1990). En el libro Observaciones latinoamericanas. Ediciones Universidad Católica de Valparaíso. Libro seleccionado por el Fondo del Libro, convocatoria 2012. Editado por Sergio Caba y Gonzalo García. ISBN 978-956-17-0514-2.
- Neira, Hernan (2010). "El silencio del proceso: La triple reducción histórico-espacial de Condorcet". Pensamiento. Revista de Investigación e Información Filosófica. 66 (249 S.Esp): 771–790.
- Neira, Hernán (2010). "América desrealizada" [Unrealized America]. Revista de Filosofía (in Spanish). 66: 45–61. doi:10.4067/S0718-43602010000100003.
- La mirada de Chile. The International Literary Quarterly #12, August 2010. Nueva York 2010.
- Neira, Hernán (2010). "Carta de Chile: O estado, a educación e o terremoto". Grial. 186: 134–135.
- Neira, Hernán (4 May 2010). "Jean-Luc Nancy: materialismo, globalización y ontología fenomenológica". Filosofia Unisinos. 11 (1): 17–32. doi:10.4013/fsu.2010.111.02. hdl:10533/144640.
- Neira, Hernán (June 2010). "La esfera, el mol y la ciudad" [The sphere, the mole and the city]. Kriterion: Revista de Filosofía (in Spanish). 51 (121): 259–273. doi:10.1590/S0100-512X2010000100013. hdl:10533/144520.
- Neira, Hernán (2008). "The Philosophical Underwriting of a Rebellion: Pedro De Ursúa and Lope De Aguirre's Expedition in Search of El Dorado". Chasqui. 37 (2): 106–126. JSTOR 29742271.
- Neira Barrera, Hernán (1 January 2008). "Dynamique d'une rébellion: la notion sartrienne de 'groupe' et la rébellion de Lope de Aguirre en 1559". Cuadernos Salmantinos de Filosofía. 35: 137–159. doi:10.36576/summa.29852.
- Neira, Hernán (2007). "El individuo inquietante en la pelicula Aguirre, la colera de dios, de Werner Herzog" [The disturbing individual in the movie Aguirre, the wrath of god, by Werner Herzog]. Revista de Filosofía (in Spanish). 63. doi:10.4067/S0718-43602007000100005.
- Neira, Hernán (April 2006). "Santiago en tres tiempos". Cuadernos Hispanoamericanos. 670: 29–39.
- Lope de Aguirre: elementos para la teoría del mito de la Conquista, Estudios Filológicos, Nº41/2006, Universidad Austral de Chile, Valdivia, pp. 145–163, ISI
- Segovia M., Olga; Neira B, Hernán (November 2005). "Espacios públicos urbanos: Una contribución a la identidad y confianza social y privada". Revista INVI. 20 (55): 166–182. doi:10.5354/0718-8358.2005.62168.
- Neira, Hernán (2004). "Educación universitaria en Chile: una visión panorámica centrada en los alumnos" [Education in the University of Chile: a panoramic view focused on the students]. Estudios pedagógicos (in Spanish) (30). Valdivia. doi:10.4067/S0718-07052004000100008.
- Neira, Hernán (2004). "'Añoranza del héroe', de José Ovejero". Crítica hispánica. 26 (1–2): 133–152.
- De Bergson a Sartre: creación y reproducción de la libertad, Revista de Filosofía de la Universidad de Costa Rica, volumen XLI, número 104, julio-diciembre 2003, pp. 85–96.
- Los límites de la propiedad privada según John Locke, Revista Cuadernos Salmantinos de Filosofía, Universidad de Salamanca, España, vol XXIX, 2002., pp. 69–82. Wos/Scopus
- Neira, Hernán (November 2002). "Plenilunio de Antonio Munoz Molina: trasfondo politico-literario de un crimen sexual". Taller de Letras. 31: 55–74. ProQuest 225192974.
- Mestizaje y canibalismo, artículo en libro colectivo ARTE EN AMÉRICA LATINA Y CULTURA GLOBAL, editado por prof. Rebeca León (directora de posgrado Facultad Artes Universidad de Chile), Dolmen Ediciones, Santiago, 2002. pp. 139–150. English versión: A Cannibalistic Model of Posmodernity
- El medio ambiente en los derechos humanos de tercera generación. En libro colectivo CONSERVACION BIOLOGICA, PERSPECTIVA LATINOAMERICA; R. Primack, R. Rozzi, P. Feinsinger, R. Dirzo & F. Massardo; Ed. Fondo de Cultura Económica, Ciudad de México, México., pp. 338–340.
- Neira, Hernán. "El Idiota, el extranjero y la lengua". Revista de Filosofía de la Universidad de Costa Rica. 39 (97): 97–101. Gale A109132052.
- Antígona o el debido entierro de los enemigos políticos: Revista GRIAL, Vigo, España, Nº 149, marzo 2001, Versión en castellano.
- Neira, Hernan (1 January 2001). "Resemantización y efecto retórico del vocabulario político en Camino de servidumbre, de Friedrich von Hayek". Cuadernos Salmantinos de Filosofía. 28: 351–363. doi:10.36576/summa.1137.
- Teoría de la ciudad sustentable; Revista TRANVIA (versión HTM), Departamento de Ingeniería de Transportes, Universidad de Chile, Santiago, # 11, 2001.
- Cultura nacional, globalição e antropofagia, en Luis Brandão et Antonieta Pereira (eds.), TROCAS CULTURAIS NA AMÉRICA LATINA, Universidad Fed. de Belo Horizonte, Minas Gerais, Brasil, 2000, pp. 195–206. Trad. al portugués por María Antonieta Pereira.
- Neira, Hernán (2000). "Anestética de Metales Pesados, de Yanko González Cangas". Estudios Filológicos (35). doi:10.4067/S0071-17132000003500014.
- La técnica, el ser humano y la naturaleza, Revista Cuadernos Salmantinos de Filosofía, Universidad de Salamanca, España, vol XXVII, 2000. Este artículo se encuentra en el libro La ciudad y las palabras
- Woody Allen, Lévi-Strauss y el incesto: Revista VERTENTES, # 12, 1999. Fondaçao de Ensino Superior de Sao Joao del Rei, Bello Horizonte, Brasil.
- Neira, Hernán (August 1999). "Ciencia y Metáfora: Problemas de Legitimación en las Ciencias Ambientales". Revista Austral de Ciencias Sociales (3): 159–166. doi:10.4206/rev.austral.cienc.soc.1999.n3-11.
- Neira, Hernán (1998). "Suspense... in the History of the Russian Revolution, by Leon Trotsky". Estudios Filológicos (33): 131–143. doi:10.4067/S0071-17131998003300011.
- Neira, Hernán (1998). "Lo público, lo privado y lo doméstico en el capitalismo tardío". Cuadernos Salmantinos de Filosofía. 25: 349–363. doi:10.36576/summa.1084.
- El límite ético de las ciencias ambientales, Revista AMBIENTE Y DESARROLLO, vol. XIV, #3, 1998, Santiago, publicado por CIPMA
- Neira, Hernán (1997). "Reflexiones sobre el lazo entre una teoría de la traducción y una teoría de la unidad del género humano". Estudios Filológicos (32). doi:10.4067/S0071-17131997003200012.
- La urbe como espacio infeliz, Cuadernos Salmantinos de Filosofía, Universidad de Salamanca, España vol. XXIV, pp 247.261.
- Nomadismo y despojo: notas sobre una propuesta de filosofía Americana; in FILOSOFÍA Y DEMOCRACIA, Cátedra Unesco-Chile, Ed. Lom, noviembre 1997, pp. 89–100
- Problemas de interpretación del debate indiano del siglo XVI; Revista PERSONA Y SOCIEDAD, vol 11, #3, Ilades, Santiago, diciembre 1997, pp. 41–50
- Neira, Hernán (1996). "A sondaxe de opinión como método para destruír a opinión pública (ou sobre a tradición democrática revisitada)". Grial. 34 (129): 109–117. JSTOR 29751297.
- La figura del narrador en política: el caso del candidato Ricardo Lagos, REVISTA ESTUDIOS FILOLOGICOS Nº 31, 1996, Valdivia, Chile. I
- Bricolaje literario en filosofía y ciencias sociales, Revista ESTUDIOS FILOLOGICOS Nº 30, Universidad Austral de Chile, Valdivia ISI
- La colonización de lo imaginario, Sociedades indígenas y occidentalización en el México español. Siglos XVI-VIII, Recención bibliográfica en Revista GRIAL N° 120, diciembre 1993, Tomo XXXI, Vigo, España. Traducido al gallego.
- A difícil latinidade de América Latina; traducido del castellano al gallego, Revista GRIAL # 115, Julio-Sept 1992, tomo XXX, Vigo, España, Sept. 1992. (trad. del castellano)
- El primer americano: ¿Urzúa, Inés o Lope? Revista TALLER DE LETRAS, Facultad de Letras, N° Universidad Católica de Chile, Santiago, Chile.
- Conscience impersonnelle et machines désirantes. Quelques traits communs à Sartre et à Deleuze; numero especial del "Courrier de l'éducation nationale", (en la serie "Allegory old and new, creativity and continuity in culture", de la "Société Luxembourgeoise de littérature générale et comparée", Luxemburgo, Ducado de Luxemburgo, 1992
- Neira, Hernán (1991). "Nihilism and Noesis: The Contribution of Phenomenology to the Sartrean Analysis of Flaubert". New Queries in Aesthetics and Metaphysics. pp. 367–381. doi:10.1007/978-94-011-3394-4_26. ISBN 978-94-010-5501-7.
- Neira, Hernán (1990). La liberte comme invention de la liberte : l'anthropologie sartrienne et son approfondissement par une theorie de la reproduction amplifiee de la liberte [Liberty as invention of liberty: sartrian anthropology and its development through a theory of the amplified reproduction of liberty] (Thesis) (in French).
- Borges e o folclore inmortal, traducido al gallego, Revista GRIAL N° 112, Oct-Dec 1991, Tomo XXIX, Vigo, España
- Neira, Hernán (1 January 1991). "El espejo del olvido: La idea de América en las 'Memorias' de Juan Bautista Tupac Amaru". Revista de Indias. 51 (191). Madrid: 97–120. doi:10.3989/revindias.1991.i191.1200. ProQuest 1300743025.
- Cervantes na UNESCO: ¿a espada e/ou a pluma?, traducido del castellano al gallego., Revista GRIAL N° 110, Abril-Xuño, 1991, Tomo XXIX, Vigo, España.
- La idea de origen en el concepto de América, Revista ARAUCARIA DE CHILE, #47-48, 1990, Madrid, España
- Apostar sin pruebas, génesis de la filosofía de Sartre. Revista ECHANGES N°4, Abril 1984, Instituto Chileno-Francés de Cultura, Santiago, Chile.

=== Journalism (not a complete list) ===
- Agua: derechos sin derecho. Columna de opinión en diario Le monde diplomatique – Santiago de Chile, abril 2019. p. 9.
- Providencia y sus zonas de sacrificio. Columna de opinión en diario electrónico El Mostrador, Santiago de Chile. 3/3/2019.
- Producir y obedecer. Buenas razones para eliminar la filosofía. Columna de opinión en diario La Tercera, Santiago de Chile, 31 de agosto 2016. Con motivo de la propuesta del Ministerio de Educación de eliminar la filosofía de la enseñanza secundaria chilena. 15
- No hay plan B. Columna de opinión en LE MONDE DIPLOMATIQUE, edición chilena, Nº 164, agosto 2015.
- Mundial, fútbol y carnaval. Artículo en LE MONDE DIPLOMATIQUE, edición chilena, Nº 153, julio 2014.
- La nación y la universidad. Columna en LE MONDE DIPLOMATIQUE, edición digital chilena, Nº 143, agosto 2013.
- Fotocopias subvencionadas vs. Bibliotecas buenas, artículo en EL CICERÓN AUSTRAL, publicación del Centro de Alumnos de la Facultad de Ciencias Jurídicas, Universidad Austral de Chile. 2005.
- La fierecilla domada, educación superior en Chile, artículo en revista Artes y Letras, diario El Mercurio, Santiago, 24/10/04
- El legado de Derrida, artículo en revista Artes y Letras, diario El Mercurio, Santiago, 17/10/04
- De Bergson a Sartre, artículo en revista Artes y letras, diario El Mercurio, Santiago, 6/04/03.
- Un juego de información, Revista Literastur Nº4, 2002 Gijón, España.
- El exilio y el mar; artículo en revista Artes y letras, diario El Mercurio, Santiago, 20/01/02.
- La tecnología no es neutra; artículo en revista Artes y Letras, diario El Mercurio, Santiago.
- El Idiota de la Familia: el Flaubert de Sartre; artículo en revista Artes y Letras, diario El Mercurio, Santiago, 27/02/00.
- Libertad de expresión, columna de opinión en p. A-2, diario El Mercurio, 26/06/99.
- La conquista de El Dorado, artículo en revista Artes y Letras, diario El Mercurio, 12/10/97.
- Reflexiones sobre Valdivia, columna de opinión en p A-2, diario El Mercurio, Stgo, 26/3/96.
- Los anhelos cumplidos, artículo en revista Artes y Letras, diario El Mercurio, 30/4/96.
- Artículos de crítica literaria en Diario La Nación, Santiago de Chile, 1994.
- Sartre, vivo, columna de opinión en diario El País (España), 15/4/89.
- Manuel Almeyda, artículo en revista ANALISIS, N° 76, Enero-Feb. 1984, Santiago, Chile.
- El hábito no hace al monje, artículo en revista ANALISIS, #48, agosto 1982. Santiago de Chile
- Artículos y editoriales en revista Perspectivas, Santiago, Chile. 1978–1983

==== Journalism in Revista Ecos de España y Lationoamérica ====
- 2020/01 Chile. El país avanza hacia una nueva constitución. Reportaje. pp. 40–42
- 2019/9 La araña del rincón. Escenas de Ultramar. P. 15
- 2018/12 La pesadilla de la comunicación. Escenas de Ultramar. P. 17
- 2018/03 Piñera Presidente. Nuevo giro a la derecha. Reportaje. Pp. 28.29
- 2018/02 Pailón. Escenas de Ultramar. P. 15
- 2017/02 En bicicleta por Santiago de Chile. pp. 24–27
- 2016/02 El desierto de Atacama. Tan seco y tan vivo. pp. 9–15. (HN: este texto fue publicado con a nombre de Hernán Neia, quien desconoce la autoría).
- 2016/01 Un día en el mercado. Interculturalidad. pp. 56–59.
- 2015/12 Una cena programada. Escenas de ultramar. P. 40
- 2015/08 Chile. Vivir con los volcanes. Reportaje. pp. 48–51
- 2015/02. El fin de la corbata. Escenas de ultramar, p. 52.
- 2014/07 Arden 3.000 casas. Escenas de Ultranar. P. 58.
- 2013/06 Mauricio, el maestro pintor. Sección: Un día en la vida de... pp. 30–31
- 2013/05 Inflación de sonrisas. Escena de Ultramar. P. 34.
- 2012/01 Escalando el volcán Villarrica. Lugares mágicos. Reportaje con fotos. Inserto. Pp. 1 a 8.
- 2011/11 Protestas estudiantiles en Chile. Reportaje. pp. 38–41.
- 2011/01 Viaje al fondo de la tierra. Reportaje. Pp. 42.45.
- 2011/01 Soy un heredero. Escenas de ultramar. P. 52
- 2010/05 Una nueva derecha en Chile. Reportaje. pp. 18–20.
- 2010/04 El vecino del 77. Escenas de ultramar.
- 2009/01 Entre internet y el machetazo. La vida de los jóvenes chilenos de hoy. Reportaje con fotos. pp. 48–52.
- 2008/05 Una visita anhelada. Cuento. pp. 56–58.
- 2002/03 Entrevista en sección 3x3. P. 7.
- 2001/08 Curiosa caravana. Escena de Ultramar, p. 26.
- 2000/10. Rupanco: el lago que siempre cambia. 9900 caracteres. pp. 52–55.
- 2000/10 Quemar las naves. Escena de ultramar. P. 25.
- 1999/12 Cazador cazado. Escena de Ultramar, p. 21.
- 1999/05 Agua Fresca. Escena de Ultramar. P. 63.
- 1999/01 Los mapuches. Reportaje. pp. 44–49.
- 1998/05 Votos con uniforme. Escena de ultramar. Publicado como “El general”, mayo 1998, p. 27.
- 1998/05 Una vista anhelada. Cuento.
- 1998/04 Reportaje: Chiloé. El último refugio. pp. 60–64.
- 1997/11 Un simple día de clases. Escena de ultramar, p. 53.
- 1997/06 Reportaje: José León: Un artista en el ombligo del mundo, pp 66–68.
- 1997/03 De profesión embaucador. Escena de ultramar, p. 23.
- 1996/09 Un 18 de septiembre. Escena de ultramar, p 25.
- 1995/05 Valdivia: la ciudad de los cisnes salvajes. Reportaje, pp. 52. 54.
- 1994/07 Atacama, un desierto parecido al hielo. Reportaje, pp. 20–23.
- 1994/03 Paseo presidencial Eduardo Frei. Reportaje, pp. 24–26.
