= Zorobabel Rodríguez (writer) =

Chilean lawyer, politician, writer, and journalist (1849-1901)

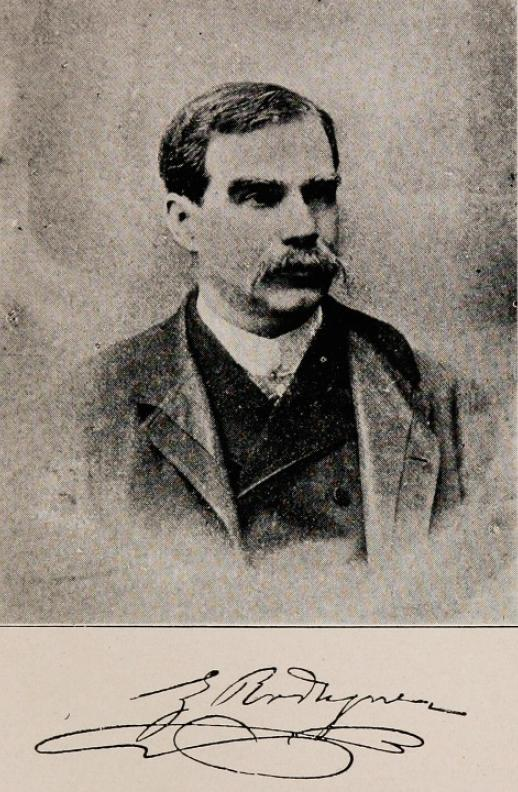

Alternate Deputy
- In office 1870 to and to – 1873
- Constituency: Chillán, Chile

Alternate Deputy
- In office 1873–1876
- Constituency: Chillán, Chile

Alternate Deputy
- In office 1876–1879
- Constituency: Chillán, Chile

Alternate Deputy
- In office 1879–1882
- Constituency: Santiago de Chile

Alternate Deputy
- In office 1885–1888
- Constituency: Linares, Chile

Alternate Deputy
- In office 1888–1891
- Constituency: Santiago de Chile

Personal details
- Born: October 4, 1849 Chile, Quillota, Chile
- Died: September 29, 1901 (aged 51) Chile Valparaíso, Chile
- Occupation: Writer

Zorobabel Rodríguez (1849–1901) was a Chilean lawyer, politician, writer and journalist. He was born in Quillota on October 4, 1849, and died in Valparaíso on September 29, 1901. He founded the El Independiente and La Union newspapers. He was the son of José Martín Rodríguez Osorio and Francisca Benavides Carrera.

== Education and career ==
Rodríguez earned a law degree on October 1, 1884. That same year, and until 1887 he served as professor of economics at the Faculty of Law at the University of Chile.

Politically he campaigned for the Conservative Party, functioning as alternate deputy for Chillán in three consecutive periods: from 1870 to 1873, 1873 to 1876 and 1876 to 1879. He was alternate deputy for Santiago twice from 1879 to 1882 and from 1888 to 1891. He was also alternate deputy for Linares, from 1885 to 1888.

In 1891 participated in the revolution against the Balmaceda government.

He was also superintendent of customs at Valparaíso, from 1891 to 1901.

== Works ==
- 1864 - La cueva del loco Eustaquio - The cave of the mad Eustatius.
- 1875 - Diccionario de chilenismos - Dictionary of Chileanisms.
- 1893 - Estudios económicos - Economic studies.
- Francisco Bilbao: su vida y sus doctrinas - 'Francisco Bilbao: His life and doctrines.
- Perfiles y reminiscencias - Profiles and Reminiscences.
- Tratado de economía política - Treatise on political economy.
