= Tadea de San Joaquín =

Chilean nun

- Born: 1750
- Died: 1827 (aged 76–77)
- Occupations: Carmelite nun, writer
- Notable work: Relación de la inundación que hizo el río Mapocho de la ciudad de Santiago de Chile, en el Monasterio de Carmelitas, Titular de San Rafael

Sister (Spanish: Sor) Tadea de San Joaquín (c. 1750–1827) was a Carmelite nun and writer of the Chilean Colonial period who wrote Catholic confessional ballad about the great flood of 1783. She is said to be the first woman poet of Chile.

== Biography ==
Tadea García de la Huerta was born around 1750 in Santiago, Chile to the well-to-do family of Pedro García de la Huerta and María Ignacia Rosales. Her maternal grandfather was the Royal Court lawyer, Juan Rosales. In 1770, she joined the newly formed convent Monasterio del Carmen de San Rafael and took the name Sister Tadea de San Joaquín. In 1783, a flood forced the nuns of the convent to flee and Sister Tadea was encouraged to write a ballad about the events to her confessor who was away. Her detailed depiction of the events, titled Relación de la inundación que hizo el río Mapocho de la ciudad de Santiago de Chile, en el Monasterio de Carmelitas, Titular de San Rafael, describes the nuns' assent to the church tower to escape the rising water; their eventual rescue by three men, including Sister Tadea's brother, who were sent by Bishop Alday; and their final flight through waist-high water. It is considered the first poem of a Chilean woman and was published in Lima, Peru in 1784. The ballad is 516 verses in octosyllabic meter and demonstrates that she was familiar with both Baroque and epic poetry. Initially printed with an anonymous author, her identity was not revealed until 1850, when José Ignacio Eyzaguirre Portales ecclesiastical historian of Chile, identified her and her work.

Sister Tadea served as superior of the monastery three times and composed verses until her death in 1827.

== Bibliography ==
- Davies, Catherine; Owen, Hilary; Brewster, Claire (2007). South American Independence: Gender, Politics, Text. Liverpool, England: Liverpool University Press. ISBN 978-1-78138-797-9.
- Tierney, Helen (1999). Women's Studies Encyclopedia. Westport, Connecticut: Greenwood Publishing Group. ISBN 978-0-313-31073-7.
