= Mariano Latorre =

Chilean writer (1886–1955)

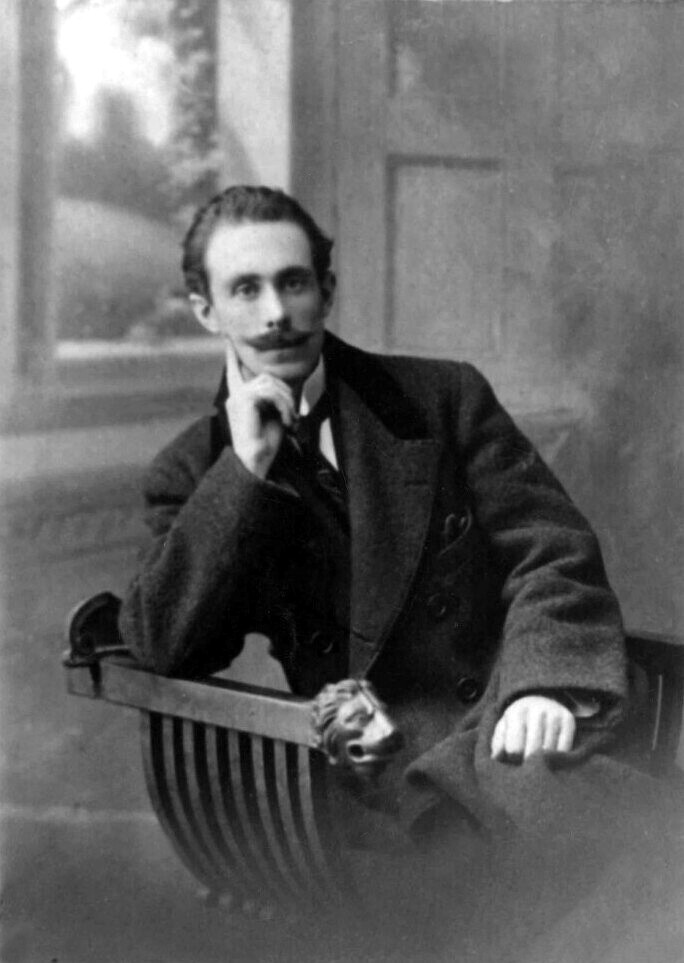
- Born: Mariano Lautaro Latorre Court; 4 January 1886; Cobquecura, Chile
- Died: 10 November 1955 (aged 69); Santiago, Chile
- Education: University of Chile
- Occupations: Writer, Spanish language professor
- Spouse: Virginia Blanco
- Children: Mirella Latorre
- Awards: Atenea Award; National Prize for Literature

Mariano Lautaro Latorre Court (4 January 1886 – 10 November 1955) was a Chilean writer of Basque descent. He won the Chilean National Prize for Literature in 1944.

== Works ==
Notable works:

- Cuentos del Maule (1912)
- Cuna de Cóndores (1918)
- Zurzulita (1920)
- Ully (1923)
- Chilenos del Mar (1929)
- On Panta (1935)
- Hombres y Zorros (1937)
- La Literatura de Chile (1941)
- Mapu (1942)
- Viento de Mallines (1944)
- El Choroy de Oro (1946)
- Chile, País de Rincones (1947)
- El Caracol (1952)
- La Paquera (1958)
- La Isla de los Pájaros (1959)
- Memorias y otras confidencias (published in 1971)
