= Baldomero Lillo =

Chilean Naturalist author

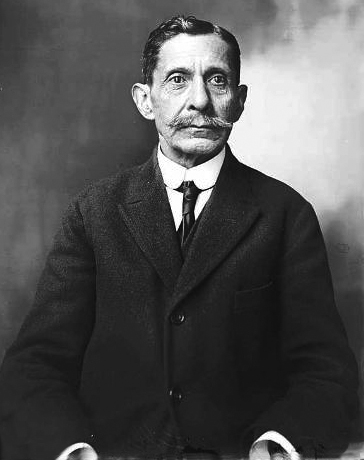
Baldomero Lillo (1910s)

Baldomero Lillo (6 January 1867, in Lota, Chile – 10 September 1923, in San Bernardo, Chile) was a Chilean Naturalist author. His works focused on social protest.

== Early life ==
Lillo's father traveled to California to participate in the 1848 Gold Rush, where he learned about mining, but returned without a fortune. He moved to Lota, Chile, to work in the coal mines. Baldomero Lillo grew up in these mining communities and worked in the mines.

== Career ==
During this time, he was exposed to the writings of the French author Émile Zola, who used the philosophy of Positivism and the literary current of Naturalism to challenge the conditions of French coal mines. Lillo observed similar conditions in Chilean mines and set out to improve the condition of the workers by dramatizing their plight. Lillo wrote many short stories (collected in Sub Sole and Sub Terra that sparked the interest of social activists.
