= LGBTQ culture in Chile =

LGBTQ culture in Chile encompasses the various arts and entertainment events in the country that have a focus on sexual diversity or include LGBTQ people in them.

== Museums and archives ==
In 2012, part of the sound archive for the radio program Triángulo abierto, particularly the segments dedicated to lesbian culture, were donated to the National Archives of Chile for preservation as part of the Lesbian Work and Studies fund / Women's Centre at the Salón de Las Preciosas.

On 21 June 2020, the Museo Di, a virtual museum that became the first museum dedicated to preserving and presenting the history of the LGBTQ community in the country, was presented. Through Instagram posts, the museum aims to retrieve stories dedicated to the evolution of sexual diversity in Chile.

On 28 June 2021, the Homosexual Integration and Liberation Movement (MOVILH) presented a site containing the organization's historical archive, including records from 1875 to the present day and focusing on the history of sexual diversity rights movements since 1991.

As a remembrance of the murder of Mónica Briones and to preserve the historical memory of sexual diversity during the military dictatorship of Augusto Pinochet, the Mónica Briones Fund was started by the Museum of Memory and Human Rights in Santiago on 9 July 2022.

On 26 August 2024, the Santiago Severín Library in Valparaíso introduced the historical archives of the Sindicato Afrodita, becoming the first repository for documentation and testimonies about the transgender population of Chile. The official website of the archives was also opened, which in its initial launch compiled ten testimonies from transgender individuals. Part of the archive was showcased in the exhibition "Fuerza Travesti Organizada. Archivo Histórico del Sindicato Afrodita de Valparaíso" in the National Archives of Chile between 20 March and 25 May 2025.

== Visual arts ==
Considered to be one of the most prominent figures in contemporary Chilean visual arts, Claudio Bravo was an openly gay hyperrealism painter who reflected his identity in his artworks. Enrique Puelma was another artist known for his homoerotic illustrations, who moved to Germany and later to Switzerland.

Beginning in 1974 with the presentation of his performance titled Happening de las gallinas, artist Carlos Leppe explored themes considered taboo at the time with his art, such as self-exploration of the body, sexuality and in general, frequently using his own body in artistic manifestations.

One of the most widely known lesbian artists is Mónica Briones, a painter and sculptor who was murdered on 9 July 1984 in the first documented lesbophobic attack in the country's history.

Lorenza Böttner was a Chilean-German transgender artist who had both arms amputated since the age of eight; as a result, she learned to paint with her feet and mouth, becoming a multidisciplinary artist who used photography, drawing, painting and street shows as a way to create an artistic and political body.

Between 1982 and 1987, photographer Paz Errázuriz recorded life inside of travesti brothels in Santiago and Talca; her work is featured in the book La manzana de Adán, published in 1990 and further containing texts from Claudia Donoso in which she narrates the challenges that transvestism and prostitution faced during Chile's military dictatorship.

Various openly LGBT artists have contributed to the development of visual arts in their works in contemporary times, such as Seba Calfuqueo, a transgender artist of Mapuche descent who has depicted homosexuality in Mapuche culture and its censorship following the arrival of Spanish conquistadors in Chile in her art.

== Cinema ==
Daniel Emilfork was amongst the most prominent Chilean movie actors of the mid- to late 20th century, acting in multiple movies in Europe. In 1949, he decided to leave Chile and move to France following homophobic persecution prevalent in his country at the time. Daniela Vega, starring in A Fantastic Woman, would become the first openly transgender Chilean actress.

Homosexuality in Chilean cinema is a sparsely represented theme, and its more explicit inclusion began at the start of the 21st century. The first gay character in a Chilean theatrical movie was played by actor Luis Alarcón in Candy or Mint in 1990. Subsequently released films that incorporate LGBT themes include Muñeca (2008), Empaná de pino (2008), Lokas (2008), Des/Esperando (2010), Drama (2010), My Last Round (2010), Mapa para conversar (2011), Young & Wild (2012), Otra película de amor (2012), In The Grayscale (2015), Nasty Baby (2015), You'll Never Be Alone (2016), and Best Foreign Language Film winner at the 90th Academy Awards A Fantastic Woman (2017). Further highlighted are feature films Naomi Campbell (2013) and The Guest (2014), as well as the documentaries El hombre nuevo (2015) and Tan inmunda y tan feliz (2022).

Short films centered around LGBT themes include Desde siempre (1996) - considered the first Chilean production tackling sexual diversity as a primary subject -, El Regalo (2002), Blokes (2010), La Santa (2012), Iglú (2013), Solsticio de primavera para un primer amor (2013), Plutón (2014), San Cristóbal (2015), Aguas abajo (2015) and Lost Queens (2015).

Since 2008, the annual LGBTI International Film Festival (Cine Movilh) has been hosted in Santiago, which is the country's largest showcase of national and international films exploring themes of sexual diversity. After the festival concludes, the films are showcased in cities around the country such as Arica, Iquique, Antafagasta, Coquimbo, La Serena, Chillán and Puerto Montt, with the screenings being organized by various groups of the Chilean Federation of Sexual Diversity (Fedisech).

Since 2016, Santiago and Valparaíso host the AMOR Festival, a cinematography competition focused on LGBT productions.

== Literature ==
In early 20th-century Chile, artistic and literary circles were mainly based in Santiago, where homosexuality was practiced freely but not openly. Multiple gay figures in literature were influential at the time, such as authors Augusto d'Halmar and Benjamín Subercaseaux, and literary critic Hernán Díaz Arrieta. There were furthermore artists at the time whose homosexuality was well known, such as writer Luis Oyarzún, poet Eduardo Molina Ventura and painter Roberto Humeres.

Chilean literature of the era began to produce several stories with gay themes, beginning with the 1915 novel La sombra inquieta by Hernán Díaz Arrieta, where the first effeminate character in Chilean literature was included. The novel Pasión y muerte del Cura Deusto, published in 1924 by Augusto D'Halmar, winner of the first National Prize for Literature in Chile in 1942, subsequently narrates the tragedy of a priest in love with another man. Though the novel was first published in Spain, it is considered the first in Latin America which explicitly tackles a same-sex relationship.

In 1935, Joaquín Edwards Bello described a lesbian character in La chica del Crillón, which is seldom mentioned in the story.

Various heterosexual authors such as Alejandro Jodorowsky and Enrique Lafourcade collaborated with homosexual artists who helped in launching their careers. Lafourcade devoted significant attention on homosexuality in his first works such as Pena de muerte (1952) and Para subir al cielo (1959). The relatively open nature of the subject matter in aristocratic, intellectual and artistic circles permitted the publication of some external literary works that also displayed homosexuality, influenced by events in Europe.

In spite of this relative openness, its rejection outside of the particular circles was widespread, leading to many important authors hiding their homosexuality in public. This was the case for José Donoso and winner of the 1945 Nobel Prize in Literature Gabriela Mistral, two of the biggest writers of the country's literature. Shortly after the murder of both of them and the publication of their epistolary personal works at the start of the 21st century, their sexuality was discovered, which had been a taboo subject for an extended amount of time. Both Mistral and Donoso reflect their feelings of pain over not being able to live out their personal relationships in their letters.

Standout authors from the mid-20th century include the likes of Adolfo Couve (died 1998) and Mauricio Wacquez (died 2000), whose novels featuring gay themes were limited in reach.

From the end of the 20th to the beginning of the 21st century, more authors began to appear that, in addition to being openly homosexual, reflected on the different forms of homosexuality in their works; amongst them is the writer Alberto Fuguet and works of his such as Aeropuertos and Missing. In 2015, he released the novel No ficción, a work that explores the scenario of a homosexual world.

Pedro Lemebel is considered to be an influential author for homosexual literature and protest whose irreverent style has become known in Latin America. As a performance artist and writer, his work is characterized by the use of provocation and explicit resentment as tools for social and political criticism. In 1995, he published his first book of chronicles titled La esquina es mi corazón; other important works include De perlas y cicatrices (1998) and Adiós mariquita linda (2005). Lemebel died in January 2015 from laryngeal cancer.

Pablo Simonetti is a writer who began writing literature in 1996 and won the short story competition of the magazine Paula the following year; in 1999, he published his first book and has since maintained a successful career. Simonetti is a devout activist for sexual diversity rights in Chile.

== Communication media ==
In 1998, the website gaychile.com, the first website focused exclusively on the Chilean LGBT community, was launched. It ceased operations in 2008 when its owner, José Víctor Jorquera, replaced all of its contents with homophobic and transphobic messages after joining the Biblical Missionary Church of Paraguay. In June 2025, the domain was acquired, and the site was relaunched with content aimed at the LGBTQ community under new management.

=== Print media ===
The first periodical aimed at the Chilean LGBT community was the magazine Lambda News, the first issue of which appeared in January 1995; it was published monthly and targeted an adult LGBT readership. It was created by the Lambda Chile Center, founded in 1993 by Luis Gauthier and Roberto Pablo to raise awareness about HIV/AIDS prevention and care. The publication ran until 2004.

Between 1995 and 2000, the magazine Ama-zonas was published by the Lesbian Coordinating Committee and is considered the first Chilean periodic publication aimed specifically at lesbian readers; in May 1996, the magazine Cihom was launched, published by the Homosexual Initiative Committee; it was renamed El Otro Lado in December of the same year and was published until September 2000.

On 4 May 2002, OpusGay, Chile's first LGBT newspaper, was officially launched. It was sponsored by the Homosexual Integration and Liberation Movement (Movilh) and published eight print editions up until December of that year before transitioning to a digital format. A few days after the launch of OpusGay, the digital magazine Rompiendo el Silencio was launched; it was one of the first to address lesbian issues and also produced print editions between June 2008 and April 2010.

In October 2008, Revista G, a Chilean LGBT publication featuring content on gay men and aimed primarily at the high-income sector, was launched. It was edited by Daniel Chang and published 25 monthly print editions until October 2012.

Agenda kuir is a periodic publication that has been released annually in Valparaíso since 2013. It compiles visual and written content and transcends the LGBT spectrum, broadly focusing on topics of sexual dissidence from a transfeminist perspective.

=== Radio ===
On 15 June 1993, Radio Tierra began broadcasting Triángulo abierto, the first radio program aimed exclusively at the Chilean LGBT community. Its first presenters were Víctor Hugo Robles and Soledad Suit, and the program ran until 2007. Subsequently, in 1998, a segment called ‘Rompiendo el Silencio’ was created as part of Radio Tierra’s Amazonas program, which featured lesbian stories; it was the first program dedicated to the lesbian community. The segment would later give rise to a digital magazine and a lesbian organisation led by Érika Montecinos.

On 12 March 2004, Radio Tierra broadcast the first LGBT-themed radio drama produced in the country, entitled Amistad divina, and set in 1993. It tells the story of a young gay man whose sexual orientation is discovered by his family, leading him to the Divine nightclub in Valparaíso, which was destroyed by fire. The play featured the artist Pedro Lemebel.

On 4 September 2014, coinciding with the anniversary of the fire at the Divine nightclub, the first broadcast of Radio Divine took place in Viña del Mar; this was the first station in Chile dedicated exclusively to the LGBT community. The station broadcast its programs until 31 December 2016, when it changed its name to Viña FM and altered its programming, targeting a general audience and moving away from its focus on sexual diversity.

On 19 May 2019, Radio Universidad de Chile began broadcasting Siempre Viva en Vivo, a program produced by Víctor Hugo Robles which aims to carry on the legacy of Triángulo abierto, which Robles took part in.

=== Television ===
In 2003, the first significant gay character in a telenovela was played by the actor Felipe Braun in Machos, a show broadcast on Canal 13 which was the first to portray conflicts surrounding homosexuality within a family in a more serious and complex manner.

Various Chilean soap operas have highlighted gay and lesbian relationships in the 2000s and 2010s decades, including Puertas adentro (2003), Ídolos (2004), Cómplices (2006), El señor de La Querencia (2008), ¿Dónde está Elisa? (2009), Los exitosos Pells (2009), Conde Vrolok (2009), Manuel Rodríguez (2010), Mujeres de lujo (2010), La doña (2011), Separados (2012), Maldita (2012), La sexóloga (2012), Graduados (2013), Las 2 Carolinas (2014), No abras la puerta (2014), Preciosas (2016), Perdona nuestros pecados (2017) and Casa de muñecos (2018). Some of the series that have included prominent openly gay characters in their plots include Vivir al día (1998), Cárcel de mujeres (2007), Aquí no hay quien viva (2009) - the Chilean version of the Spanish series -, Cumpleaños (2011) and Familia moderna (2015), the latter being a Chilean adaptation of the American series Modern Family.

In 2013, the Mega television channel premiered Ojo con clase, the Chilean version of the American reality show Queer Eye.

In 2015, two domestically produced programs with exclusively LGBT content were broadcast on free-to-air television for the first time. Happy Together is a docu-reality series from Televisión Nacional de Chile (TVN) that tells the story of Julio Cezar Dantas and Juan Pablo Fuentealba, two men in love who want to start a family. In addition, The Switch Drag Race premiered – a talent show and reality program broadcast by Mega, presented by Karla Constant and featuring a special appearance by drag performer Nicole Gaultier as coach and judge. It is officially the Chilean version of the American program RuPaul’s Drag Race.

The television miniseries Zamudio: Perdides en la noche premiered in March 2015 on TVN. It recounts the homophobic murder of Daniel Zamudio and was the first program to feature scenes of gay sex on prime-time television. The first episode of the series was broadcast by the channel on Good Friday without causing controversy.

On 17 April 2021, Las gansas premiered on La Red, the first Chilean program broadcast on free-to-air television dedicated specifically to sexual diversity; the program was presented by César Muñoz and Luis Aliste. A total of 32 episodes were broadcast up until 11 December, before the program was cancelled the following week.

== Music ==
The first prominent gay musician in Chile was the folk musician and composer Rolando Alarcón, who had to keep his homosexuality a secret for most of his life due to the widespread hostility towards gay people in the mid-20th century.

Other Chilean musicians who have officially come out as homosexual include singer Giovanni Falchetti, singer and music producer Ignacio Redard, singer and indie pop musician Javiera Mena, and underground music artist, drag queen and performer Hija de Perra, who died in 2014.

At the end of the 20th and beginning of the 21st century, some Chilean musicians began releasing songs about LGBT topics, which have been taken in by the country's LGBT community. In the 1990's decade, singer Nicole wrote the song "Sirenas" after being inspired by the love story of a female friend who had discovered that she was attracted to women. The song was part of her album Sueños en tránsito (1997), produced by Gustavo Cerati. "Atrévete a aceptarlo", released in 2001 by the Chilean boy band Stereo 3, is considered a song that encourages LGBT individuals to come out. "Disfraz", from the Chilean pop rock band Kudai, is a 2009 song about homosexuality and discrimination which shows support to the LGBT community from the band.

In 2010, singer and actress Sofía Oportot released the track ‘Entender’, in which she embraces her identity and sings about her attraction to women. Also in 2010, Chilean singer and music producer Koko Stambuk released the song "Chicos y chicas" from his album Valiente, which tells the story of more gay people daring to live their truth. Romantic relationships and sexuality have been a recurring theme in his songs and musical productions.

Javiera Mena, Chile’s first openly lesbian singer, has openly dedicated songs to women, such as "Sol de invierno" (2006), "Acá entera" (2010), and "Espada" (2014).

Francisca Valenzuela released her single "Insulto" in 2015 which addresses discrimination against the LGBT community.

Horregias is a band founded in Renca in 2008, consisting of Horridia Parra (vocals and guitar), Feocia Castor (vocals and bass), and Rorri (vocals and drums), whose music is explicitly lesbian.

Musician Álex Anwandter, who has not openly defined his sexuality, is considered a prominent figure and activist for LGBT rights through his continuous support, which is reflected in his songs, videos, presentations and produced films. "¿Cómo puedes vivir contigo mismo?", a song from his 2011 album Rebeldes, has become an anthem of the fight against discrimination of homosexuality in Chile, and its music video is inspired by the documentary film Paris is Burning. The song "Tatuaje" from the same album is about love towards another man, said by Anwandter to be the first of its kind in Chile.

== Theater ==
The first same-sex kiss in a theatrical play in Chile occurred in October 1967, in the theater hall of the University of Chile's Faculty of Law, during the showing of Entreniendo al señor Sloane, an adaptation of the work of Joe Orton. The kiss scene happened between actors Alejandro Sieveking and Gregorio Rosenblut. In the following year, the play was staged in the commercial circuit in the theater Petit Rex, with the scene of the gay kiss being played by Humberto Duvauchelle and Raúl Espinoza. In 1969, the play Juego a tres manos of Enrique Girdano was staged in Concepción, which caused controversy in the city due to the explicit representation of homosexuality that was present in multiple scenes.

In August 1973, Del año de la cocoa was released and became the first theatrical work in a café-chantant style that addressed cross-dressing. The play was organised by the theater company El Altillo and starred Eduardo Soto as the protagonist; performances were suspended following the coup d'état on the Chilean state on 11 September. Three years after, in April 1976, the play Cabaret Bijoux premiered at the Santiago Hollywood Theater, starring Tomás Vidiella, and became the first major theater production where an actor performed as a cross-dresser, touring the country.

In 1996, actors Erto Pantojo and Jaima Vadell performed as a homosexual couple in the play Extrañas costumbres orales, written by Sergio Gómez and directed by Vadell.

In January 2001, Loco afán premiered, a theatrical adaptation of the work of the same name by Pedro Lemebel, directed by Alejandro Trejo.

On 29 June 2005, a separate text from Lemebel, Tengo miedo, torero, was released by the company Chilean Business.

Director Jimmy Daccarett created the theatrical trilogy titled "Identidad y Memoria Homosexual en Chile", which contained the plays Sangre como la mía (2011, adaptation of the novel of the same name by Jorge Marchant Lazcano), Heterofobia (2015, Pablo Dubott) and Narciso fracturado (2019). In 2023, Colicidio, a paranormal satire play that addresses sexual diversity in Santiago in the 1990's decade, premiered.

Other theater plays containing LGBT performances in Chile in the 21st century include Las ardientes noches de Candy Duois (Fernando Villalobos, 1990), La huida (Andrés Pérez, 2001), El escándalo de la calle Huanchaca (Pedro Zlatar, 2008, based on the 1969 street scandal in Antofagasta), Romeo y Julián (2017), Inquieto (Ernesto Orellana, 2010), Ruleta Rosa (Nibaldo Maturana, 2018), El ritmo de la noche (2020), and Daniel: voy a ser el gay más famoso de Chile (Daniel Mazuela, 2022).

== Cross-dressing and drag culture ==
Drag has been a fundamental part of the development of the LGBT community in Chile. The first large-scale drag show in the country was put on by a group called Blue Ballet, which emerged in 1967 and gave rise to drag queens who became well-known within and outside Chile, such as Candy Dubois and Marcia Torres. In 1968, new drag groups emerged, including Le Grand Ballet and The Young Royal Ballet, the latter of which having performed at the Santiago nightclubs American Bar and Royal.

During the military dictatorship, the leading figures of the national cross-dresser movement were the performers of the Circo Timoteo, which had gradually incorporated drag queens as well as shows held at some nightclubs in Santiago, such as the Quásar and Fausto nightclubs, and the Dardignac 222 bar, owned by showgirl Rosita Salaverry. At these venues, stars such as Francis Françoise, Katiuska Molotov, Janin Day, Kassandra Romanini, and Maureen Junott launched their careers. In April 1983, a drag show featuring five performers (Leonardo, Jorge, Claudio, Pablo, and Leo) debuted at the Bim bam bum revue theater, where they performed imitations of international singers.

Following the return to democracy, the Chilean drag scene gained popularity, and in 1993, the Miss Fausto beauty pageant was launched at the Fausto nightclub, which would later expand beyond the nightclub, being held in theaters such as the Caupolicán and the Cariola; later, the biennial competition Grace Awards (now called the Francis Françoise Awards in honor of the drag artist), the drag competition Amigas y Rivales and the dance competition Bailando were created. Amigas y Rivales later became the subject of a documentary reality show of the same name about its organization behind the scenes.

Since 2015, the Cumbre de Transformistas has been held annually at the Arcángel nightclub in La Serena, an event that brings together Chile’s most prominent drag queens along with national and international guests.

== Tourism ==
Although Chile does not have an internationally recognized gay tourist destination, in Santiago, its capital city, an urban LGBT culture has gradually developed, albeit to a lesser extent compared to other capitals in the Southern Cone, due to greater social acceptance of homosexuality. This is reflected in the emergence of specifically gay tourist offerings, such as gay bars, nightclubs, hotels, cafés, restaurants, and saunas. Although there is no gay neighborhood in Santiago, the Bellavista and Lastarria-Bellas Artes neighborhoods are considered gay-friendly due to the large number of LGBT people who frequent them and because they are areas of the city with many cultural attractions and a bohemian atmosphere.

According to travel agencies specializing in gay tourism in the country, San Pedro de Atacama, Easter Island, Torres del Paine National Park, Santiago, Valparaíso, and the wine regions are the favorite destinations for gay tourists. The National Tourism Service (Sernatur) does not have specific policies targeting an LGBT demographic.

In October 2016, Chile’s first LGBT and Diversity Chamber of Commerce and Tourism (CCLGBT) was officially launched. The organization aims to promote the growth of businesses and professionals committed to diversity in the country by providing them with tools for development, promoting best practices, offering support networks, and facilitating the marketing of their products and services both nationally and internationally. The initiative was also launched with the goal of promoting and monitoring labor and commercial policies and regulations that advance the interests of the LGBT community and contribute to the country’s economic, social, and sustainable development. It has the official support of the Deputy Secretariat of Economy and Small Businesses and the Deputy Secretariat of Tourism, both of which are part of the Ministry of Economy, Development, and Tourism.

In 2019, the first gay boutique hotel in the country, Hotel Velvet 375, was opened in Pucón. The following year, the first LGBT campsite in Chile was opened in the same municipality.

== See also ==
- LGBTQ history in Chile
- LGBTQ people in Chile
