= LGBTQ people in Chile =

LGBTQ people in Chile are individuals in Chile who are lesbian, gay, bisexual, transgender, or queer.

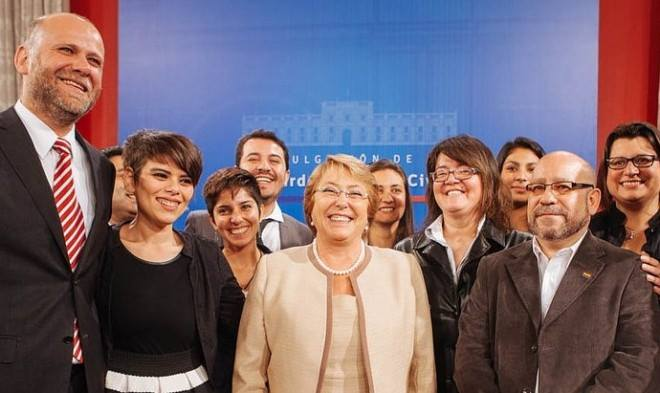
Former President Michelle Bachelet accompanied by LGBTQ rights activists during the enactment of the Civil union law in April 2015.

== LGBTQ rights ==
The LGBTQ community in Chile has gained some rights in recent years. In 2012 it was approved the anti-discrimination law that includes sexual orientation and gender identity as protected categories. The law penalizes the arbitrary discrimination, allows citizens to file anti-discrimination lawsuits and requires the State to develop public policies to end discrimination. The law also adds heightened punishments for hate crimes. The same year, the Armed Forces of Chile abolished all internal rules that prevented homosexuals from entering the Army, adapting the practices and regulations of the institution to the anti-discrimination law.

In 2015, came into force the Civil Union Agreement law, which is the first legal standard that gives explicit recognition to same-sex couples in Chile. The law enables same-sex and opposite-sex cohabitating couples to co-own property and make medical decisions as well as claim pension benefits and inherit property if their civil partner dies. Gaining custody of a partner's child where necessary is also made easier by the law. It also recognises marriages performed abroad as civil unions and views couples and their children as a family.

Since 2007, transgender people have the right to legally change their legal gender and name after completion of medical intervention. A judicial permission is required. Since 2013, sex reassignment surgeries and hormone therapy are covered by the public health system.

In January 2016, Chile became the second country in the world to outlaw non-consensual unnecessary surgical and other procedures on intersex children.

Currently in Chile there are different laws, regulations and public policies that protect LGBTQ people from discrimination such as protections in access to employment, housing, in the provision of goods and services and blood donations. Also anti-discrimination protection in public and private schools as well as an anti-bullying law that has a positive impact on the fight against homophobia in the classroom.

== LGBTQ movement ==
=== First gay demonstration ===
The homosexual protests, marches and the movement in general in Chile emerged publicly under the socialist government of Salvador Allende, months before the 1973 Chilean coup d'état. On April 22, 1973, in the Plaza de Armas in Santiago, about 30 homosexuals and transvestites were part of the first public demonstration for gay rights in the history of Chile. They gathered to protest against abuses by police, which continually jailed them for "indecency and bad manners."

Chile became one of the pioneering countries in the world in political demonstrations of homosexuals. Despite the importance of this protest, it remains invisible at national and international level.

=== LGBTQ rights organizations ===
List of LGBTQ rights organizations in Chile.

- Integración, first gay organization founded in 1977. (defunct)
- Ayuquelén, first lesbian organization founded in 1983. (defunct)
- SER, the first gay organization in southern Chile, founded in the late 1980s. (defunct)
- Lesbianas en Acción (LEA), first lesbian organization in southern Chile, founded in the late 1980s. (defunct)
- Las Yeguas del Apocalipsis, performance gay group formed in 1987. (defunct)
- Homosexual Movement of Integration and Liberation (MOVILH), founded in 1991.
- Lambda Center Chile, a gay group focused on AIDS prevention, formed in 1994. (defunct)
- Unified Movement of Sexual Minorities (MUMS Chile), founded in 1997.
- Agrupación de Personas Transgénero (Traves Chile), founded in 2001.
- Federación Chilena de la Diversidad Sexual (Fedisech), first Chilean LGBT federation formed in 2007 by thirteen organizations: Movilh, Traves Talca, Traves Navia, Afirmación Chile, Centro de Acción Social por la Diversidad (CAS), Organización de Transexual por la Dignidad de la Diversidad de Rancagua (OTD), Movihred Rancagua, Coordinadora Universitaria por la Diversidad Sexual de Osorno (Cudso), GLTTB Temuco, Chilegay Deportes, Brigay Arica, Grupo de apoyo a Hombres Transexuales (GAHT), and Agrupación de Amigos y Familiares de la Comunidad Gay de La Serena (AFAG).
- Falange por las Diversidades Sexuales (FADISE CHILE), founded in 2010.
- Fundación Iguales, founded in 2011.
- Frente de la Diversidad Sexual (FDS), formed in 2013 by eleven LGBT organizations: ACCIONGAY, Iguales Chile, MUMS, Asociación Organizando Trans Diversidades (OTD Chile), Fundación Todo Mejora, Valdiversa, lesbian group Rompiendo el Silencio, Fundación Daniel Zamudio, Red de Psicólogos de la Diversidad Sexual, SOMOS Coquimbo and Mogaleth.
- Fundación de familiares de niños y jóvenes trans (Transitar), founded in 2015.

=== LGBTQ events ===
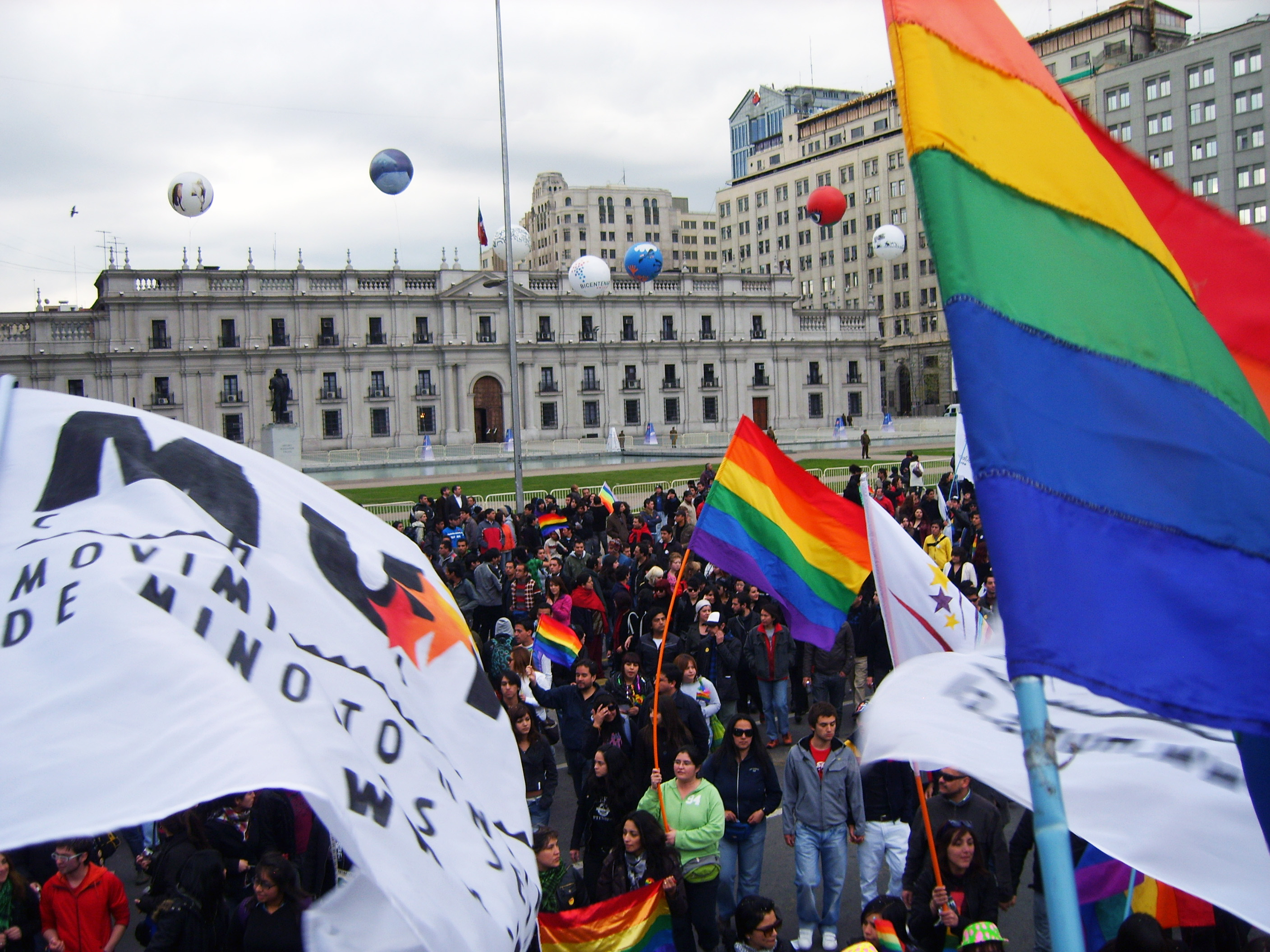
Pride parade in front of Palace of La Moneda, in Santiago in 2009.

In June 1999, The first March for Sexual Diversity was held in Santiago. Since 2001, Gay pride events have been held each year, concentrated mainly in the capital city. Chile held on July 2, 2006, its first Gay pride parade in Paseo Bulnes, in front of La Moneda Palace. In its first version the event gathered over 12,000 people. In the following years, and with the slogan Open Mind Fest, the event has continued to grow in attendance, although in November.

Since 2008 it is held annually the International LGBTI Film Festival (CINE MOVILH), being the largest LGBT film exhibition event in Chile. It takes place in October in Santiago. It awards three prizes that the audience can vote for. There are three main categories in which an award is given: feature film, documentary and short film. The films are also displayed in several cities such as Arica, Iquique, Antofagasta, Coquimbo, La Serena, Chillán and Puerto Montt.

==== IDAHO ====
Since 2005, the International Day Against Homophobia, Transphobia and Biphobia is celebrated every May 17. The LGBTQ organizations carry out different activities, forums, marches, mass events and campaigns throughout the country.

In 2013, the LGBTQ rights group MOVILH, developed a broad campaign to increase the visibility of LGBTQ rights, encouraging local authorities across the country to raise the LGBTQ rainbow flag to show support for inclusive and anti-discrimination policies in the country. That same year, six municipalities and one embassy participated. In the following years, the number of institutions that joined the campaign increased significantly. In 2016, a total of 110 public and private institutions raised the rainbow flag, including 49 municipalities, 8 embassies, 42 government agencies, 3 libraries, 3 universities, 4 political parties and a shopping center.

The School Calendar 2016 incorporates the International Day Against Homophobia. The Ministry of Education recommends to schools develop educational, artistic, cultural or sports activities in commemoration of the date.

On May 17, 2016, La Moneda presidential palace was illuminated with the colours of the rainbow to celebrate the International Day Against Homophobia and Transphobia. Chile became the second country in the world to light up a government building with the rainbow, after the United States, which illuminated the White House in 2015.

=== LGBTQ people in politics ===
In 2004, Alejandra González Pino became the first transsexual to reach a position of public representation in Latin America. Gonzalez was elected council member for Lampa. In the municipal elections of 2012 she was re-elected for her third term and received the first majority of votes in her commune.

In 2012, Jaime Parada became the first openly gay councilman elected to office in Chile. He was elected as councilman for the commune of Providencia. In the same municipal elections, voters elected transgender council member Zuliana Araya. She won her bid as councilmember for the commune of Valparaíso.

In 2013, Claudio Arriagada became the first openly gay man elected to office in Chile's Chamber of Deputies. Deputy Guillermo Ceroni, elected in 2013, came out in 2015.

In 2014, Pedro Felipe Ramirez was appointed by President Michelle Bachelet as Chile's ambassador to Venezuela. He was a deputy (1969–1973) and minister in the government of Salvador Allende. In 1984, during the military dictatorship of Augusto Pinochet, Ramirez faced a complex episode, which threatened to expose his homosexuality, after which for his own safety he opted for the retirement from public political life. At that time homosexuality was strongly rejected by society.

Cristián Loyola González, a councilman from the Chilean commune of Quilaco, came out as gay in September 2014.

In 2016, Oscar Rementería, a militant of center party Amplitud, became the first gay activist elected vice president of a political party in Chile.

In the 2016 municipal elections, three openly gay men and two transgender women were elected as council members for the first time in their respective communes. Ricardo Cantín in Coyhaique, Hernando Durán Palma in Talca, Esteban Barriga in Temuco, Juliana Bustos Zapata in Collipulli and Almendra Silva Millalonco in the commune of Cisnes. Meanwhile, Jaime Parada and transgender Zuliana Araya were re-elected as councilors for the period 2016–2020.

== LGBTQ people ==
=== Living conditions ===
There are no legal restrictions on adult same-sex sexual relations or the organization of LGBTQ events in Chile. The law sets the age of consent at 18 for homosexual sexual activity; heterosexual activity is permitted, under some circumstances, at age 14. The Catholic Church and traditional beliefs regarding gender roles do play a combined role in prevailing attitudes about sex roles, sexual orientation and gender identity. Although much of Chilean conservative society continues to regard homosexuality with a degree of contempt, the gay community has not faced the worst conditions of a continent plagued by machismo.

The perception of LGBTQ people in Chile has improved as a result of the increase in visibility within the media, including ad campaigns by the Government. Nevertheless, there have been cases of discrimination due to sexual orientation and gender identity reported, including cases involving violence or death. In 2012, following a hate crime against Daniel Zamudio, Law No. 20,609 to Establish Measures against Discrimination was adopted. Additionally, as of October 22, 2015, same-sex couples can legally enter into a Civil union agreement. The law resembles marriage in some respects, and grants a new civil status.

Gays and lesbians visiting Chile will most likely not encounter any prejudice or outward intolerance. However, public displays of affection between same sexes are rare in many cities. Many gays and lesbians are not actively open about their orientation outside their own circles. At least every regional capital has a gay club, which is usually where the LGBTQ community meets.

In Chile, transgender people are often associated with homosexuality. Transgender women are mostly discriminated, unable to enter the labor market so their only way of survival is prostitution, therefore they are exposed to violence and police harassment. According to a 2009 study conducted by RedLacTrans, about 95% of Chilean transgender women work as prostitutes because of family, social and employment discrimination. As for transgender men, in many cases they decide to violate their gender identity using female or unisex clothes to get a job. Since 2007, name and sex change on legal documents are only allowed by court order.

While LGBTQ can be found anywhere throughout Chile, the LGBTQ community is more visible in Santiago; especially in the gay-friendly neighborhoods Bellavista and Parque Forestal (also known as Bellas Artes). Pride parades are increasingly common in the area while gay bars, clubs and saunas can be found everywhere. The city's gay scene is not a recent phenomenon: gay clubs like Fausto or Capricho Español claim to be the oldest in South America.

=== Population ===
The National Socioeconomic Characterization Survey (Casen), developed by the Ministry of Social Development, is a household survey at national level covering various topics. In 2015, for the first time the Casen Survey included questions regarding sexual orientation and gender identity. The results released in October 2016 indicate that 98.51% identified as heterosexual, 1.04% as gay or lesbian, 0.37% as bisexual, while 0.02% declare another sexual orientation. The question about gender identity found that trans women accounted for 3.1%, and trans men for 2.3%. The data is a result of 109,949 total face-to-face interviews among citizens aged 18 and over. Nevertheless, LGBTQ rights groups Movilh and Fundación Iguales criticized the methodology of the survey, indicating that they deviate from international estimates and questioning that the percentage of transgender people is higher than gays and lesbians.

The Seventh National Youth Survey published in 2013 by the Chilean National Institute of Youth (INJUV), applied to 8,352 young people between 15 and 29 years old, found that 84.1% identified as heterosexual, 2.2% as homosexual and 1.1% as bisexual, while 12.6% did not answer.

In the 2012 census, for the first time, 34,447 Chileans recognized living with someone of the same sex. Of the total of people living with someone of the same sex, 20,406 are women and 14,041 are men.

Same-sex Cohabitation according to the 2012 Census
Region	People who live with their same-sex partners
Arica y Parinacota	337
Tarapacá	620
Antofagasta	1,180
Atacama	524
Coquimbo	1,230
Valparaíso	3,600
Metropolitana de Santiago	18,670
Libertador General Bernardo O'Higgins	1,409
Maule	1,129
Bío Bío	2,430
La Araucanía	1,243
Los Ríos	498
Los Lagos	1,245
Aysén del General Carlos Ibáñez del Campo	115
Magallanes y la Antártica Chilena	187

In the 2024 census, questions about gender identity were included for the first time. 60,664 people identified themselves as transgender or non-binary, making up 0.4% of Chile's adult population.

=== Religion ===
Religion of LGBT people in Chile (2013)
1. Roman Catholicism (25.0%)
2. Protestantism (4.90%)
3. Other religions (12.3%)
4. Unaffiliated (57.8%)

According to a 2013 survey, LGBTQ Chileans, compared to the general Chilean population, were much more likely to have no religious affiliation. The First National Survey of Sexual Diversity found that 57.8% had no religion, 25% were Catholic, 4.9% were Protestant, and 12.3% to other religion or beliefs.

In contrast, according to a 2015 survey the general population reported 68% Christian (55% Roman Catholic, 13% Protestant), and 7% other religion. While 25% are either atheist, agnostic or without religion in particular.

== Social attitudes ==
=== Public opinion ===
Although Chile has been considered a conservative country regarding homosexuality, according to several studies, this perception has changed considerably in society through the years.

According to a 1997 study by Fundación Ideas and the University of Chile, 70.6% of Chileans agreed that "doctors should investigate the causes of homosexuality, in order to prevent their continuing birth." In addition, 45.2% believed that "homosexuality should be banned for being unnatural." In 2000, the same study shows a slight increase in tolerance of public opinion. 57.3% of Chileans agreed that doctors should investigate homosexuality while 31.6% wanted homosexuality to be banned again.

Pew Global Attitudes Project 2013: "Which one of these comes closer to your opinion, number 1 or number 2?: #1 – Homosexuality should be accepted by society, #2 – Homosexuality should not be accepted by society". Percentage of responders who were in favor of #1: 81–90% 71–80% 61–70% 51–60% 41–50% 31–40% 21–30% 11–20% 1–10% No data

In 2004, a Fundación Chile 21 survey conducted in 10 cities across the country, revealed a significant drop in intolerance toward homosexuals. In the research, 94% of respondents agreed that gays and lesbians "are discriminated in the country," while 84% felt that homophobia is unjustified because "we are all equal, with equal rights", "it is a life choice that must be respected ", or because "homosexuals are also citizens." Only 15% considered that homophobia is justified either because sexual minorities "are not a good example for young people", "are sick people" or "are immoral people and cause distrust." A clear indication of declining prejudice could be seen in the fact that 85% of respondents said that pedophilia is unrelated to sexual minorities, since that crime "may be committed equally by homosexual and heterosexual people."

According to a 2013 Pew Research Center report, a clear mayority in Chile (68%) say homosexuality should be accepted. Women (74%) are more likely than men (62%) to say homosexuality should be accepted by society. Chile ranked 11 out of 39 countries surveyed.

ILGA-RIWI 2016 Global Attitudes Survey on LGBTI People (Chile data)
Question	Agree	Neither	Disagree
Adults should be allowed to have private consensual same-sex relationships.	40%	36%	24%
Bullying of young people who identify or are perceived as LGBT is a significant problem.	42%	22%	36%
Human rights should be applied to everyone, regardless of whom they feel attracted to or the gender they identify with.	73%	16%	10%
Question	Disagree	Neither	Agree
Being LGBT should be a crime.	65%	22%	13%
Gender is assigned at birth and always fixed.	27%	32%	41%
Same-sex desire is a Western world phenomenon.	42%	39%	19%
Question	Yes	Don't know	No
If a female child always dressed and expressed herself as a boy, would you find that acceptable?	45%	25%	30%
If a male child always dressed and expressed himself as a girl, would you find that acceptable?	41%	27%	32%
Should same-sex marriage be legal?	48%	20%	32%
Question	No	Don't know	Yes
Do you think that children whose genitals are unclear at birth should be surgically assigned a gender by medical professionals?	43%	38%	19%
Question	No concerns	Somewhat uncomfortable	Very uncomfortable
How would you feel if your neighbour is gay or lesbian?	85%	8%	7%
Question	Not upset	Somewhat upset	Very upset
Would you be upset if one of your children told you they were in love with someone of the same sex?	44%	37%	20%

== Homophobia ==
According to the XIV version of the Annual Report on the Human Rights of Sexual Diversity in Chile for the year 2015, from 2002 to 2015 there were 1623 reported cases and allegations involving homophobia and transphobia. Thirty two of these cases were homicides, while others include physical attacks, discrimination in the workplace and in the school system, harassment, police abuses, and statements that violate the dignity of LGBT people.

=== 2012 murder ===
In March 2012, a young gay man named Daniel Zamudio was brutally beaten and tortured for several hours by four attackers, allegedly linked to a neo-Nazi band. He died on March 27.

Because of the large number of hate crimes, the government passed an anti-discrimination law in April 2012.

=== Valparaíso camionas ===
Chile's Fifth Region, Valparaíso, has been identified as a particularly active zone in regards to homophobia — but more specifically prejudice against masculine-dressing lesbians. The identity "camiona" is similar to "butch" lesbians, with several unsolved murders and an air of fear hanging over the rural parts of the region and extending to cities like the regional capital, Valparaíso, and the capital Santiago, which is very close by. It is reported that only some of these murders make headlines, though there are several notable cases: artist Monica Briones Puccio was killed in Santiago in 1984; footballer María Pía Castro was killed in Olmué in 2008, Nicole Saavedra Bahamondes in Quillota in 2016, and Susana Sanhueza in San Felipe in 2017. The musical group Torta Golosa, with camiona members, offers support in the region.

=== State-sponsored ===
In the early part of the twenty-first century, greater publicity has been generated about LGBT people in Chile and the discrimination and harassment that they face, specifically involving the Chilean state. Some of the more notable examples of this include the following:

==== 2004 removal of bisexual judge ====
In January 2004, the Chilean Supreme Court removed married judge Daniel Calvo from his position on the Santiago Court of Appeals, after media reports that he visited a sauna frequented by gay men. The story broke following the arrest of a Chilevisión TV editor for illegally taping, and then broadcasting, a conversation in the judge's chambers. Judge Calvo, investigating the case of an accused businessman running a child pornography ring, was taped in his office in a discussion with the owner of a gay sauna, in which he acknowledged being a former client.

==== 2004 removal of custody rights from lesbian former judge ====
In 2004, the Chilean Supreme Court confirmed a lower court's decision that stripped former judge Karen Atala of custody of her three daughters because she is a lesbian. The case was taken up by the Inter-American Commission on Human Rights. In March 2012, the Inter-American Court of Human Rights ruled in favor of Atala.

=== Efforts to combat homophobia ===
==== 2010 maricón PSA ====
In 2010, the Chilean government launched a public service announcement which referred to spousal or domestic abusers as maricón, which sparked outrage from LGBT rights advocates at home and abroad. Change.org and Chilean LGBT group Soy Hombre Soy Mujer co-sponsored a November 2010 petition against the campaign, while El Movimiento de Integración y Liberación Homosexual (Movilh) supported the campaign.

The key of the campaign was based in the polysemy of the word maricón, which in Chile means gay, treacherous, abuser, and unfair. In one of the spots, the well known gay photographer Jordi Castell says "Maricón es el que le pega a una mujer", i.e. "maricón is the one who abuses a woman (and not a gay man)". In another spot, football referee Pablo Pozo says the same sentence, which in this case means "maricón is the one who abuses a woman (and not a supposedly unfair referee)". This campaign earned a Golden Effie Award.

== LGBTQ culture ==
=== Literature and arts ===
In the early 20th century in Chile, the artistic and literary circles mainly lie in Santiago where homosexuality was lived freely but not publicly. Even many homosexuals were very influential at the time. Among those which stand out are the writers Augusto d'Halmar, Benjamín Subercaseaux and literary critic Hernán Díaz Arrieta. In addition, artists whose homosexuality was known such as the writer Luis Oyarzún, poet Eduardo Molina and painter Roberto Humeres.

Chilean literature in those years began to develop profusely gay-themed stories, which began with the novel La sombra inquieta by Diaz Arrieta, published in 1915, where the first effeminate character of national literature is included. Subsequently, the novel Pasión y muerte del Cura Deusto, published in 1924 by D'Halmar, winner of the first Chilean National Prize for Literature in 1942, tells the tragic love of a priest for another man. Although the novel was first published in Spain, it is considered the first in Latin America that explicitly discusses the relationship between a same-sex couple.

In 1935, Joaquín Edwards Bello described in La chica del Crillón a lesbian character, an issue that was rarely mentioned. Several heterosexual authors like Alejandro Jodorowsky and Enrique Lafourcade shared with homosexual artists who boosted their careers. Lafourcade devoted important roles to homosexuality in his early works as Pena de muerte (1952) and Para subir al cielo (1959). The relative openness of the topic in aristocratic, intellectual and artistic circles, influenced by events in Europe, allowed the publication of some foreign literary works that also portrayed homosexuality.

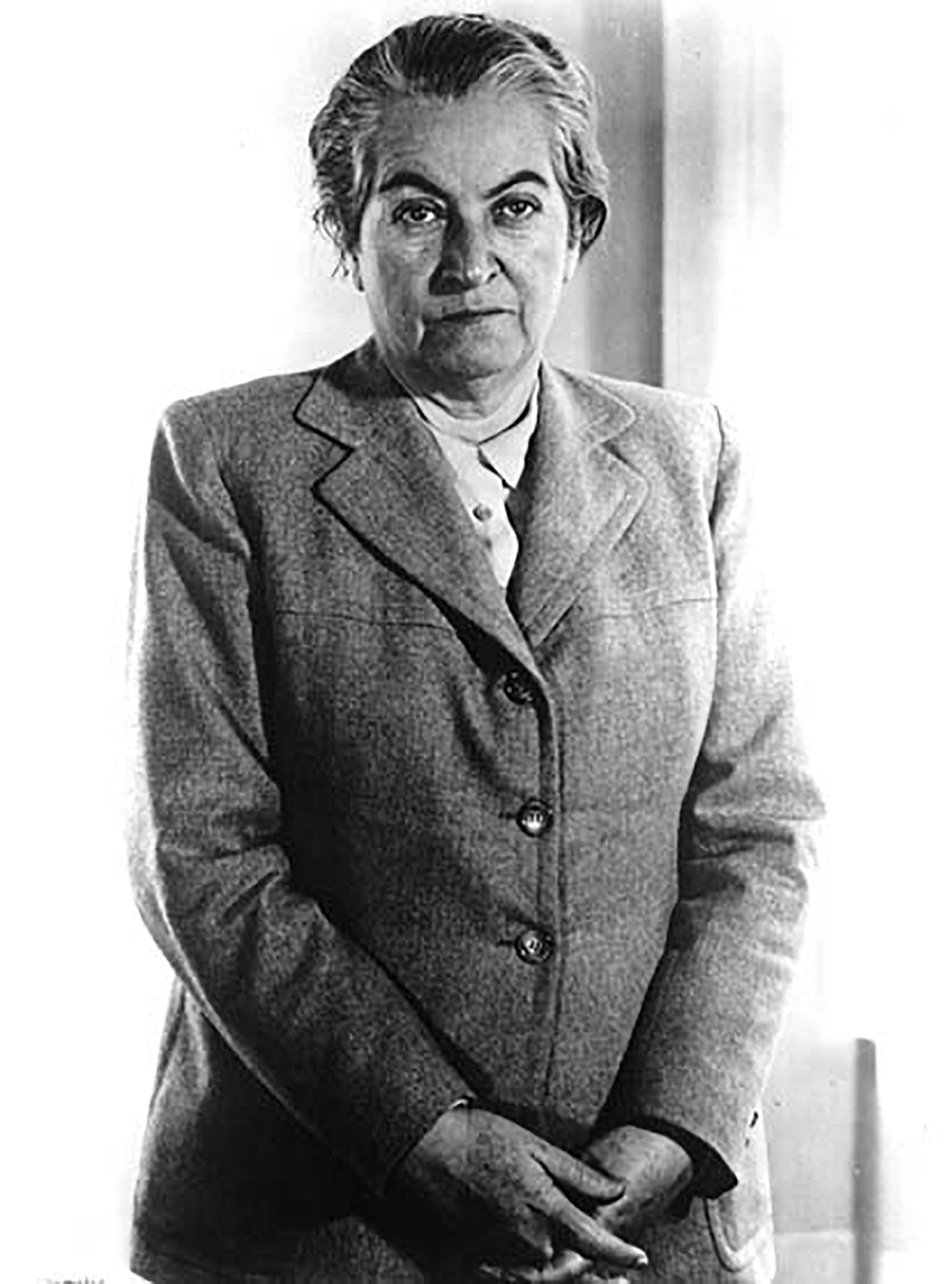
Gabriela Mistral was the pseudonym used by Lucila Godoy Alcayaga, a Chilean poet, educator and feminist who became the first Latin American to win the Nobel Prize in Literature in 1945.

Despite this relative openness, rejection outside these circles was widespread, so many important authors hide their homosexuality in society. This was the case of José Donoso and the winner of the Nobel Prize for Literature Gabriela Mistral, two of the greatest writers of literature in the country. Only after the death of both and the publication of their personal epistolary work in the early 21st century, it was discovered their homosexuality, which had long been a taboo subject. Both Mistral and Donoso reflected in their letters the pain of not being able to live their personal relationships. In the mid-20th century stand out the writer and painter Adolfo Couve, who died in 1998, and the writer Mauricio Wacquez, who died in 2000, whose novels in which is included the gay issue, had little diffusion.

Since the late 20th century and early 21st century, more writers started to appear, who apart from declaring themselves as gays, homosexuality is reflected in different ways in their works. Among them is the writer Alberto Fuguet, and some of his works Aeropuertos, Missing and Velodromo. In 2015 he also published the novel No ficción, a work that explores the homosexual world.

Among other prominent writers, Pedro Lemebel is considered as an influential writer for homosexual and protest literature, his irreverent style has become known throughout Latin America. As a performance artist and writer, his work is characterized by the use of provocation and resentment as tools for political and social criticism. In 1995 he published his first book of chronicles La esquina es mi corazón, other important works are the chronicles De perlas y cicatrices (1998) and Adiós mariquita linda (2005). Lemebel died in January 2015 because of laryngeal cancer. And more recently the writer Pablo Simonetti, who devotes himself to literature in 1996 and the following year won the contest tales of Paula magazine. In 1999 he published his first book and since then has maintained a prolific career. Simonetti is also currently an activist for the rights of sexual minorities in Chile.

=== Music ===
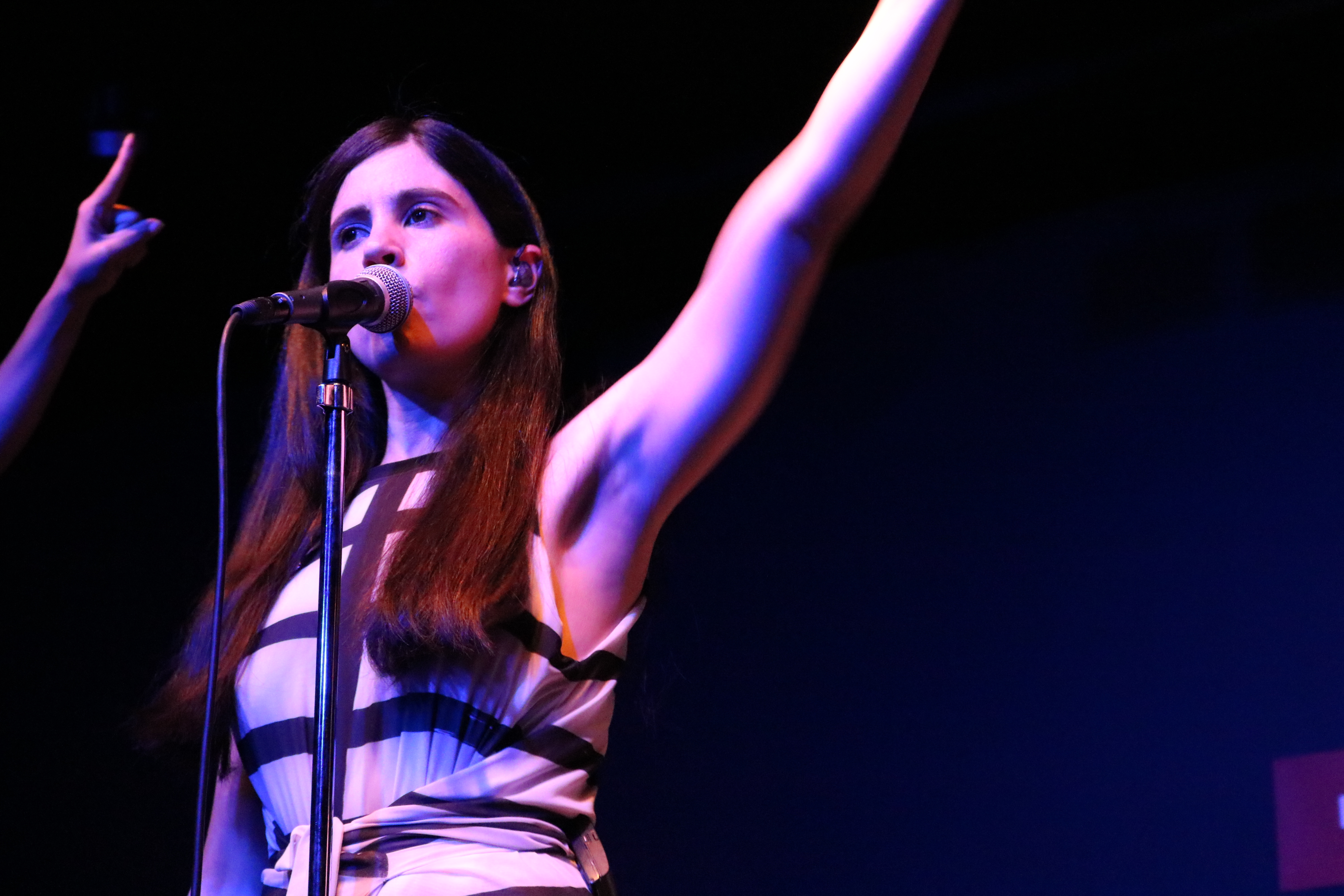
Javiera Mena, first openly lesbian Chilean singer.

The first prominent gay musician was the Chilean folklorist and composer Rolando Alarcón, who had to live his homosexuality in secret most of the time due to the prevailing hostility against homosexuals in the mid-20th century.

Currently, among Chilean musicians who have openly declared their homosexuality are the singer Giovanni Falchetti, singer and music producer Ignacio Redard, and indie electropop musician and singer Javiera Mena. In the underground scene stands out the transgressive singer, drag queen and performance artist Hija de Perra, who died in 2014.

Only in the late 20th century and early 21st century, some Chilean musicians have released songs that deal with LGBTQ issues, which have been embraced by the lesbian, gay, bisexual, and transgender community in the country. In the 1990s, the singer Nicole wrote the song "Sirenas" inspired by the love story of a female friend who had discovered that she liked girls. The song was part of her album Sueños en tránsito (1997), produced by Gustavo Cerati. "Atrevete a aceptarlo" released in 2001 by Chilean boy band Stereo-3, is considered in the country a song that invites LGBTQ people to come out of the closet. "Disfraz" of the Chilean pop-rock band Kudai, is a song from 2009 that talks about homosexuality and discrimination, demonstrating the support of the band to the LGBT community.

Singer and actress Sofía Oportot released in 2010 the song "Entender" in which she assumes and sings with no complex: "Quién puede entender a una mujer mejor que otra mujer, no es tan difícil saber si es amistad o placer" (Who can understand a woman better than another woman, is not so difficult to know whether it is friendship or pleasure). Oportot is one of the most active singers in the gay underground scene in Chile. Also in 2010, Chilean singer and musical producer Koko Stambuk released the song entitled "Chicos y chicas" from his album Valiente, which tells how more and more gay people dare to live their truth. Loving relationships and sexuality has been a recurring theme in his songs and musical productions.

Javiera Mena, first openly lesbian Chilean singer, has openly dedicated songs to the female gender, such as "Sol de invierno" (2006), "Acá entera" (2010), and more recently "Espada" (2014). Francisca Valenzuela stands out with her 2015 single "Insulto". The song talks about discrimination against the LGBTQ community. Sexual diversity has been a banner of struggle of this singer who has been permanently committed to the cause.

The musician Álex Anwandter, who has not openly defined his sexuality, is considered an icon and activist for LGBTQ rights because of his continued support that is reflected in their songs, videos, performances and lately also in filmmaking. From his album Rebeldes (2011) stand out two songs. "¿Cómo puedes vivir contigo mismo?" has become an anthem of the fight against discrimination of homosexuals in Chile, its music video is inspired by the documentary Paris is Burning. Also, "Tatuaje" a love song dedicated to another man, apparently the first of its kind in Chile according to him.

Other Chilean artists who constantly and openly support the LGBTQ community are Gepe, Lulú Jam, Maria Colores, Camila Moreno, Dënver, Mon Laferte and Denise Rosenthal.

=== Television ===
Television is one of the most popular and influential media throughout the country. Chilean television has undergone a process of openness towards homosexuality from 2000 in terms of visibility in series and soap operas (telenovelas) including openly gay and lesbians characters, plus the emergence of openly gay people in other TV programs.

There have been many Chilean gay characters in telenovelas since the 1980s. In 2003, the first relevant gay character in a telenovela was played by actor Felipe Braun in Machos. According to critics, this telenovela, broadcast by Canal 13, was the first to show the conflict of homosexuality in the family in a more serious and complex way.

Different Chilean telenovelas have made visible the relationships of gays and lesbians during the last decade; these are: Puertas adentro (2003), Ídolos (2004), Cómplices (2006), El Señor de la Querencia (2008), ¿Dónde está Elisa? (2009), Los exitosos Pells (2009), Conde Vrolok (2009), Manuel Rodríguez: Guerrillero del Amor (2010), Mujeres de lujo (2010), Infiltradas (2011), La Doña (2011), Separados (2012), Maldita (2012), La Sexóloga (2012), Graduados (2013), Las 2 Carolinas (2014), No abras la puerta (2014), Preciosas (2016), Perdona nuestros pecados (2017), and Casa de muñecos (2018). Some of the series that have included relevant and openly gay characters to the plot are: Vivir al día (1998), Cárcel de mujeres (2007), Aquí no hay quien viva (2009), the Chilean version of Spanish series, Cumpleaños (2011); and Modern Family (2015), Chilean adaptation of the American series.

In 2013, TV network Mega premieres Ojo con clase, the Chilean version of the American reality serie Queer Eye. During 2015 is transmitted for the first time in open signal two nationally produced programmes with LGBTQ exclusive content. "Happy Together" is a TVN network docureality and is the story of two men in love who want to start a family, Julio Cezar Dantas and Juan Pablo Fuentealba. Also, "The Switch Drag Race: The art of Drag", is a talent show and reality show broadcast by TV network Mega. Hosted by Karla Constant and with the special participacion of drag diva Nicole Gaultier as coach and judge. It is officially the Chilean version of the American show RuPaul's Drag Race.

The television miniseries Zamudio: Lost at night premiered in March 2015, aired by TVN channel. It describes the homophobic murder of Daniel Zamudio, and it was the first to show gay sex scenes on television in prime time. The first episode of the series was re-played by the TV channel on Good Friday, without controversy.

=== Cinema ===
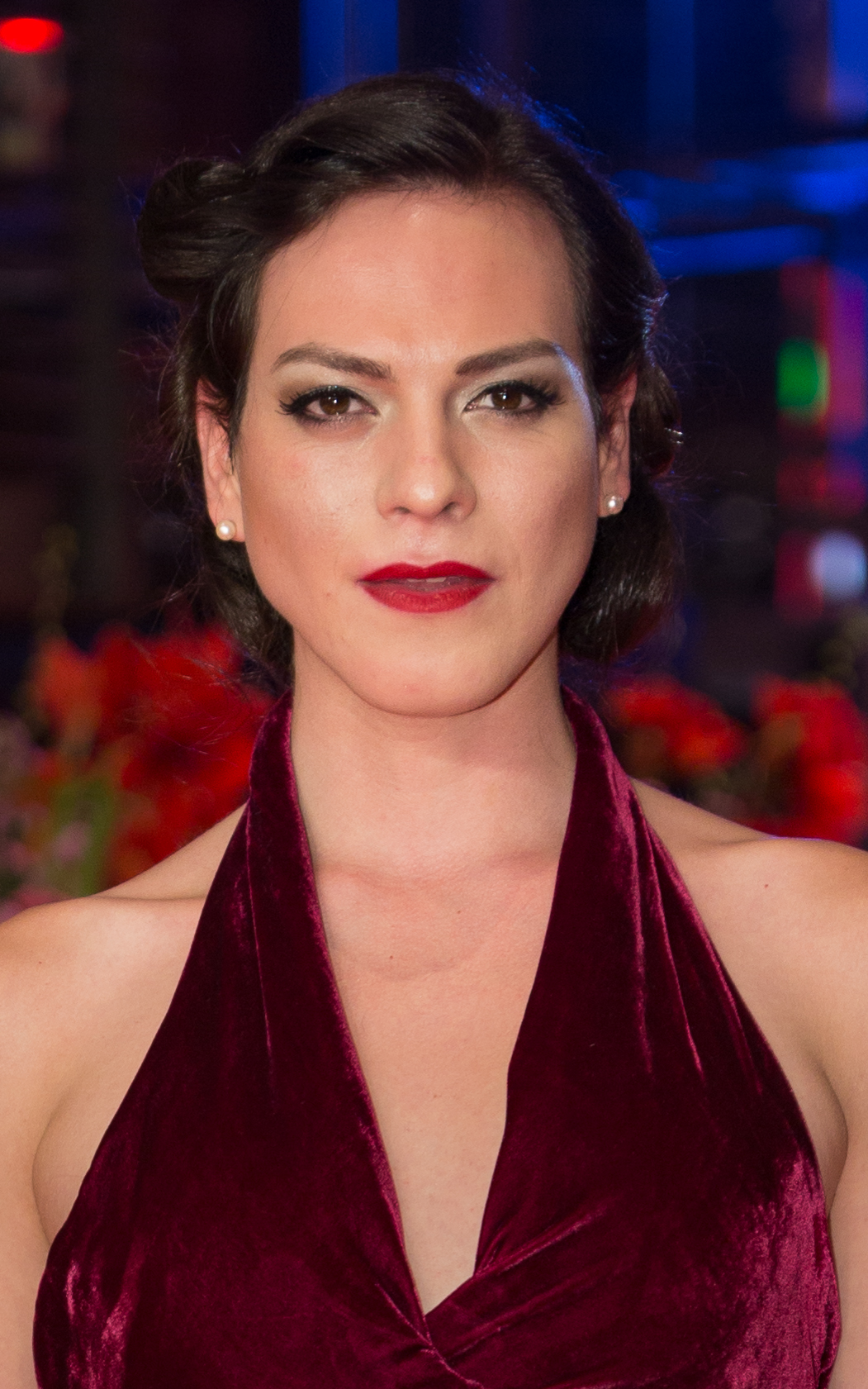
Daniela Vega, first openly transgender Chilean actress.

Daniel Emilfork, was the most prominent Chilean film actor during the mid- and late 20th century, acting in numerous films in Europe. In 1949, he decided to leave Chile and settled in France, due to the homophobic persecution that existed in his country. A Fantastic Woman star Daniela Vega, is the first openly transgender Chilean actress.

Homosexuality in Chilean cinema is a subject that is rarely portrayed and has done in a more explicit way in the early 21st century. The first gay character in a Chilean film was played by actor Luis Alarcón in Caluga o menta (1990). Among the films that deal in a broad sense LGBTQ issues include: Muñeca (2008), Lokas (2009), Des/Esperando (2010), Drama (2010), Otra película de amor (2010), Mapa para conversar (2011), Mi último round (2012), Joven y alocada (2012), En la gama de los grises (2015), Nasty Baby (2015), Nunca vas a estar solo (2016), and Oscar-winning film A Fantastic Woman (2017). Also, the feature films Naomi Campbel (2013), La Visita (2014), and documentary film El hombre nuevo (2015).

The LGBTQ-related short films include: El Regalo (2002), Blokes (2010), La Santa (2012), Iglú (2013), Solsticio de primavera para un primer amor (2013), Plutón (2014), San Cristóbal (2015), Aguas abajo (2015), and Locas Perdidas (2015).

=== Tourism ===
Although Chile does not have a gay tourist destination recognized internationally, in Santiago, its capital city, has been developed gradually and to a lesser extent compared to the other capitals of the Southern Cone, an LGBTQ culture urban due to greater social acceptance of homosexuality, which is reflected by the appearance of a specifically gay-oriented tourism offer, such as gay bars, clubs, hotels, cafes, restaurants and saunas. Although there is not a gay neighborhood as such in Santiago, the Bellavista and Lastarria - Bellas Artes neighborhoods are considered gay-friendly due to the considerable turnout of LGBTQ people and to being areas of the city with many cultural attractions and bohemian life.

According to travel agencies dedicated to gay tourism in the country, San Pedro de Atacama, Easter Island, Torres del Paine National Park, Santiago, Valparaiso and the vineyards are the favorite places for gay tourists. LGBTQ people who choose Chile as a tourist destination are consolidated couples with high purchasing power who like design hotels, trendy things and luxury. Nevertheless, the National Tourism Service (Sernatur) has no specific policies towards them.

In October 2016, the first Chilean LGBT Chamber of Commerce and Tourism (CCLGBT) was inaugurated. The organization is aimed at promoting the growth of companies and professionals committed to diversity in the country, providing them with tools for their development, promotion of good practices, networks of support and commercialization of its products and services at national and international level. The initiative also emerges with the objective of promoting and monitoring policies and regulations in labor and trade matters that favor the interests of the LGBTQ community, and contribute to the economic, social and sustainable development of the country. It is officially supported by the Undersecretary of Economy and Small Enterprise and the Undersecretary of Tourism, both under the Ministry for the Economy, Development, and Tourism.

== See also ==
- LGBT in Argentina
- LGBT in Colombia
- LGBT in Mexico
- LGBT rights in Chile
- LGBT history in Chile
- Recognition of same-sex unions in Chile
