= Huanchaca street scandal =

Huanchaca street scandal may refer to:

- 1969 Huanchaca street scandal
- 1978 Huanchaca street scandal
