= Jaime Parada =

Chilean gay rights activist and politician

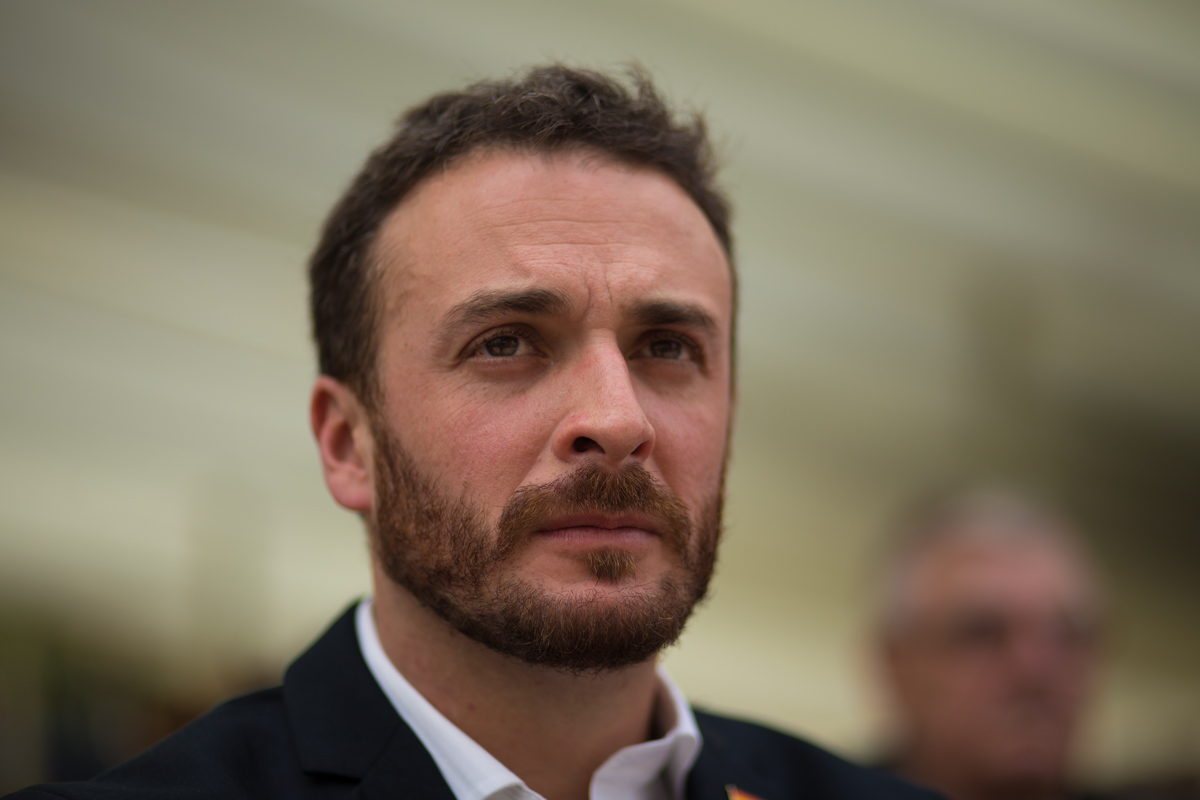
- Parada in 2013

Councilman for Providencia
- In office December 6, 2012 – November 24, 2020

Personal details
- Born: November 2, 1977 (age 48) Santiago, Chile
- Party: Progressive
- Education: Finis Terrae University; Pontifical Catholic University of Chile
- Occupation: Politician

José Jaime Parada Hoyl (born November 2, 1977) is a Chilean gay rights activist and politician who became the first openly gay person elected to public office in Chile.

He served as the spokesperson for the Homosexual Movement of Integration and Liberation, the leading Chilean gay rights organization. He also served as councilman for his home commune of Providencia, from 2012 to 2020.

== Biography ==
Parada was born in the commune of Las Condes. His father is a Panamanian-Chilean veterinarian and his mother is a homemaker. He completed his secondary schooling at the Instituto Presidente Errázuriz, a state-subsidized Catholic boys school. He studied history at Finis Terrae University, graduating first in his class. He is currently a doctoral candidate of history at the Pontifical Catholic University of Chile in the area of the social history of science. At Finis Terrae, Parada served as the director of the School of History and the research and archives coordinator of the Centro de Investigación y Documentación en Historia de Chile Contemporáneo ("Center for Research and Documentation of Contemporary Chilean History") from 2010 to 2011.

In June 2010, Parada came to prominence after his article "El matrimonio gay en cartas" ("Gay marriage in letters") was published in the newspaper The Clinic. It consisted of a series of e-mails exchanged Parada and a family member on in support of gay marriage, which was not then recognized by the state. In 2011, Parada began his career as a political activist, joining MOVILH and becoming its spokesperson. In March 2012, after the brutal beating of Daniel Zamudio by neo-Nazis because of his sexual orientation, Parada and MOVILH played an important role in securing legislation introducing severe penalties for hate crimes on the basis of sexual orientation. That year, with the support of Marco Enríquez-Ominami's Progressive Party, Parada launched his candidacy for municipal councilman for the commune of Providencia, winning a four-year term to last until 2016. Parada was backed by Josefa Errázuriz, who successfully ran for mayor of Providencia, against the conservative incumbent, Cristián Labbé, whom Parada has referred to as a “recalcitrant fascist” for his support of the Pinochet regime. His victory makes him the first openly gay politician elected in Chilean history. Parada's election was part of a historic election season in which rightwing, mayors Labbé and Antonio Garrido of Independencia were defeated and the first two transgender women, Zuliana Araya in Valparaíso and Alejandra González in Lampa, were also elected.

== Electoral history ==
=== 2012 municipal election ===
- 2012 municipal election, for the municipal council of Providencia

(Candidates with more than 2% of the votes are listed.)

Candidate	Coalition	Party	Votes	%	Results
Manuel Monckeberg Balmaceda	Coalición	RN	8249	13,16	Elected
Pilar Cruz Hurtado	Coalición	RN	5374	8,57	Elected
Nicolás Muñoz Montes	Concertación Democrática	PDC	4600	7,34	Elected
Iván Noguera Phillips	Coalición	UDI	4468	7,13	Elected
Jaime Parada Hoyl	El Cambio por Ti	PRO	3551	5,67	Elected
Rodrigo García Márquez	Por un Chile Justo	PPD	3320	5,30	Elected
Pedro Lizana Greve	Coalición	ILH	3207	5,12	Elected
Pablo Jaeguer Cousiño	Concertación Democrática	PDC	3068	4,90	
Leonardo Perez Brown	Por un Chile Justo	ILE	2381	3,80	
Tomas Irarrázaval Llona	Coalición	UDI	2353	3,75	
Mónica Rasmussen Villacura	Coalición	UDI	2192	3,50	
Malva Retamales Zamorano	Por un Chile Justo	PC	2015	3,21	
Virginia Vial Valenzuela	Coalición	UDI	1984	3,17	
David Silva Jhonson	Concertación Democrática	PS	1904	3,04	Elected
María Gaete Drago	Concertación Democrática	PS	1677	2,68	
