= El Anillo Rojo =

El Anillo Rojo (English: The Red Ring) was the name of a group of gay men from the Chilean city of Antofagasta. The group became known when it was raided by the police on 18 March 1973 during a private party, and the incident generated reactions and debates in the press and in the public about homosexuality and the LGBTQ community.

== Incident ==
On the night of 17 March 1973, the members of the El Ring Rojo ("The Red Ring"), a group of homosexual men, had gathered in a house located on Avenida Argentina, popularly known as "Casa de Palo" in the Chilean city of Antofagasta. They were holding a party with a group of conscripts from different military units in the city. After the Carabineros received a phone call reporting annoying noises and possible drug use, at 1:30 a.m. on 18 March, a group of police officers arrived on the scene to investigate the same. They proceeded to arrest 24 people including eight people who were dressed in women's clothing, along with 14 conscripts and two university students. Among the arrested was Marcia Torres, who was the first person in Chile to undergo sex reassignment surgery in 1974.

== Aftermath ==
On the morning of 19 March, the detainees were produced in front of Judge Juan Sinn Bruno at the Second Crime Court of Antofagasta. After taking statements, the judge remanded the homosexuals to five days in prison while the judicial process was being adjudicated, and the conscripted men were ordered to return to the barracks. On the same day, the conscripts were transferred to the prison and were remanded to be tried by the civil courts. On 21 March, lawyer Hugo Soto took up the defense of three of the detainees, after each of them paid 13,000 escudos. Three days later, all those arrested at the party were released for lack of merit.

== Reactions ==
The event attracted extensive coverage in the local press and discussion on homosexuality and transsexuality. Local publications like La Estrella del Norte and El Popular carried the news as headlines. Several people gave comments on the issue including the local prison warden Alfonso Monjes Villagrán, General Joaquín Lagos Osorio from the First Division of the Army, psychologist María Alburquenque from the University of the North, and a nun from the Community of the Good Shepherd.

The detainees were interviewed during their imprisonment, and they said that it was only a social gathering and not a homosexual orgy as reported by the local press.

The local press also compared the incident to the 1969 Huanchaca street scandal, which took place in the same city in June 1969 in which 24 people were arrested.

== See also ==
- LGBT rights in Chile
