= Araya (name) =

== Surname ==
Araya, is a Spanish surname of Basque and also Catalan origin. A Japanese surname Araya of unrelated origin also exists, "usually written with characters meaning 'wild valley' or 'new valley'". People with the surname Araya or Araia include:

- Felipe Araya (born 1991), Chilean footballer
- Francesco Araia (1709–1770?), Italian composer
- Guillermo Araya (born 1985), Chilean handball player
- Graciela Araya (born 1962), Chilean-born Austrian mezzo-soprano opera singer
- Johnny Araya Monge (born 1957), Costa Rican politician
- Pedro Araya Toro (born 1942), Chilean footballer
- Rayén Araya (born 1981), Chilean radio and television journalist
- Rolando Araya Monge (born 1947), Costa Rican socialist politician
- Tom Araya (born 1961), Chilean-born American musician, lead singer and bass player with Slayer
- Tomohiro Araya (荒谷 友碩; born 1994), Japanese wushu practitioner
- Yerko Araya (born 1986), Chilean racewalker
- Zuliana Araya (born 1964), Chilean politician and LGBTQ activist

== Given name ==
Araya is a Tigray-Tigrinya given name/lineage name. People with this name include:

- Araya Desta (1945–2021), Eritrean diplomat
- Araya A. Hargate (born 1981), Thai actress, model and television personality
- Araya Mengesha (born 1989), Canadian actor
- Araya Selassie Yohannes (1867–1888), Ethiopian army commander and nobleman
- Gugsa Araya Selassie (1885–1932), son of Araya Selassie Yohannes
- Zeudi Araya (born 1951), Eritrean actress
