= 1973 Santiago gay protest =

1973 protest in Chile

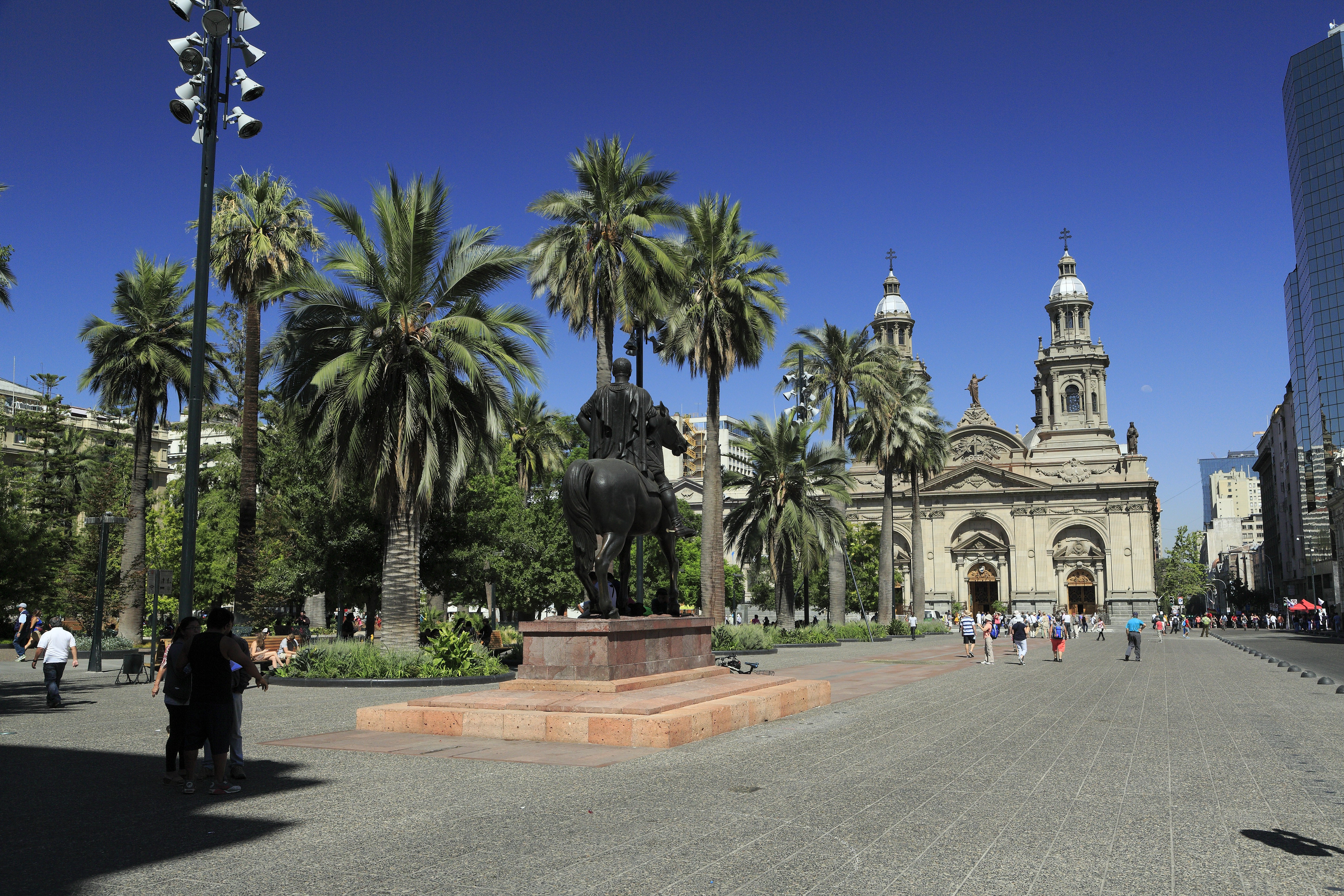
- Plaza de Armas in Santiago, Chile
- Date: April 22, 1973
- Time: 19:00-20:00
- Location: Santiago; 33°26′15″S 70°38′59.9″W
- Type: Demonstration
- Motive: Protest against police abuses

A protest in the Plaza de Armas in Santiago which occurred on 22 April 1973 was the first LGBT demonstration in Chile, as well as one of the first in Latin America. The protestors were campaigning against police brutality, in particular against the beatings which they received.

== Developing ==
The demonstration had been organized by a group of homosexuals, mainly transvestites and people who practiced prostitution in the sectors surrounding the Plaza de Armas in Santiago —as well as on Huérfanos and Alameda streets. A large part of them were from low or popular strata and denounced constant harassment by carabineros, raids and arrests for "offenses against morals and good customs", which included beatings and total haircuts. The meeting took place approximately between 7:00 and 8:00 p.m. on Sunday, 22 April 1973 in the eastern sector of the Plaza de Armas, in front of Phillips Street.

Some of the attendees were known by their pseudonyms, including "La Gitana" (indicated by various sources as one of the organizers and main speakers of the protest), "La Viviana", "La Rossana", "La Raquel" (pseudonym of Luis Troncoso Lobos), "La Escalera al Cielo", "Katty Fontey" "La Larguero", "La Eva", "La Romané", "La José Caballo", "La Confort", "La Natacha" and "La Vanesa". There were also participants who had pseudonyms similar to those of some Chilean personalities, such as "La Fresia Soto" and "La Peggy Cordero". Part of the group had a characteristic dress, made up of striped sweaters and bell-bottoms.

The demonstrators performed dances and shouted slogans in the area of the bandstand and the equestrian statue of Pedro de Valdivia; in said sculpture some people climbed to its base to carry out the protest. According to the press of the time, among the requests -in addition to putting an end to police abuse and the rejection of society- was legalizing same-sex marriage, although this is denied by "La Raquel", one of those present at the protest. Initially, Carabineros did not intervene to dissolve the demonstration, however, around 8:00 p.m. the group had already dispersed due to the police presence, which included a van that was parked on Estado Street.

The number of attendees varies according to the sources: the newspaper Clarín and the magazine Paloma spoke of about 50 people, Puro Chile mentions between 30 and 50, while the magazine Vea speaks of "around a hundred arriving at the meeting on time, although only about twenty confronted the reporters and the cameras". This last publication also reported the presence of homosexuals who were not demonstrating but did attend the event covertly for fear of being photographed or having their identity revealed.

== Reactions ==
Some media outlets of the time —such as the newspapers Clarín and Puro Chile and the magazines Vea and Paloma— reported on the demonstration through their chronicles, some of them using high-caliber words to refer to the participants in a derogatory manner.

Newspaper Clarín headlined on its cover "Colipatos ask for chicha and pork" (in Spanish: "Colipatos piden chicha y chancho"), alluding to the demands for greater freedom, while on its back cover it titled the note about the protest with the text "Ostentation of their sexual deviations the maracos made in Plaza de Armas" (in Spanish: "Ostentación de sus desviaciones sexuales hicieron los maracos en la Plaza de Armas"). The newspaper Puro Chile headlined in its article "Barrio Alto 'colas' will hold a rally in "Lo Castillo"", referring to the protest planned for the following days and which did not take place.

The women's magazine Paloma, of the Quimantú National Publisher, reported that "they flaunted their abnormality, provoking the rejection and disgust of the public", being "a Creole copy of other brotherhoods of English sodomites". On the other hand, the magazine Vea titled on its cover "Homosexual Rebellion. The "weirdos" want to get married" (in Spanish: "Rebelión homosexual. Los 'raros' quieren casarse"), while the main note inside the edition was titled "The rebellion of the 'weirds'" (in Spanish: "La rebelión de los 'raros'").

Both Clarín and Puro Chile newspapers and the Paloma magazine were openly left-wing and adherents to the government of Salvador Allende, which demonstrates the cross-cutting homophobia that existed in the country at the time. Likewise, the magazine Vea had a markedly sensationalist tone, which was also reflected in the coverage of other aspects of LGBT society, such as Marcia Torres' sex reassignment surgery.

The governor of the province of Santiago, Julio Stuardo, said that he would use "the public force and all the resources that [the] constitutional mandate gives me" in order to prevent a new demonstration scheduled this time in the Plaza Lo Castillo sector (intersection of Vitacura and Candelaria Goyenechea avenues) in the Barrio Alto of the capital, which was ultimately not carried out.

== See also ==
- LGBT history in Chile
