= LGBTQ history in Chile =

LGBT history in Chile encompasses a broad history related to gender and sexuality within the country of Chile. Oftentimes this history has been informed by the diverse forms of governments that have existed within Chile, including colonialism, military dictatorship, and democracy. Global events like the AIDS epidemic also had an impact on Chilean LGBT history. There are also multicultural elements with the different cultural perceptions of gender and sexuality from indigenous groups and Spanish influence.

== Precolonial ==
There is documentation of an Andean concept called tinkuy, which refers to the union of complementary binaries through meditation. Andean cultures also participated in same-sex relationships, which would later be used by Spanish colonizers as justification for imperialism. This typically came from a more complex perception of gender and relations by indigenous people being reduced to sodomy and therefore condemned by conquistadors. The Mapuche also had machi weye, which were co-gender specialists, typically with alternative sexualities. Further information on gender and sexuality within indigenous communities is difficult to find due to the fact that most documentation comes from Europeans, but it is at least known that indigenous peoples' conception of gender and sexuality were different to that of the Spanish settlers.

== 20th century ==
=== State repression ===
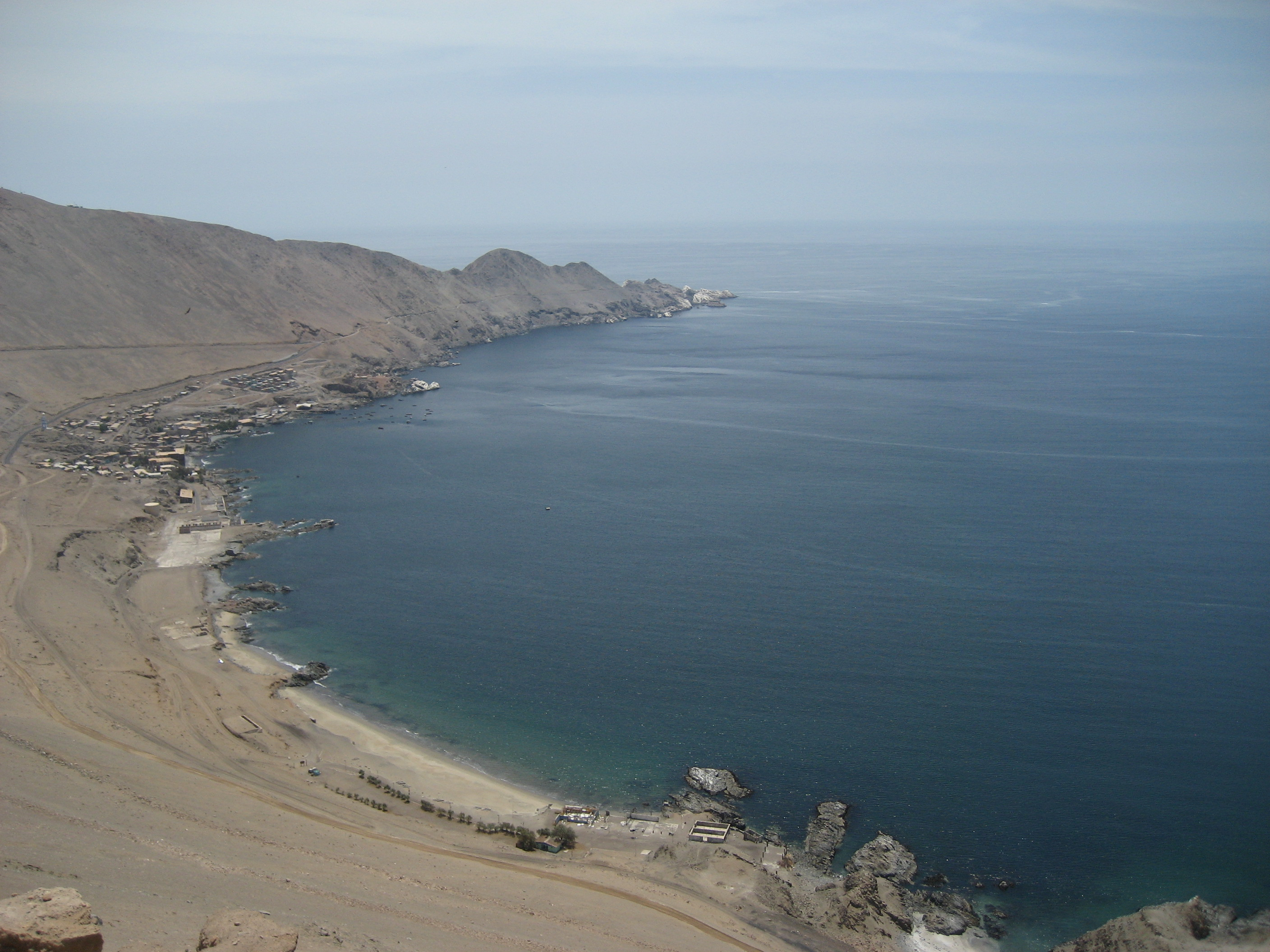
The port of Pisagua, in the north, was allegedly used by Carlos Ibáñez del Campo and his successors as a gay concentration camp.

Unlike some tolerance lived in some aristocratic areas, most of the country manifested a strong rejection of homosexuality. While sodomy was already criminalized in the Penal Code, the arrival of Carlos Ibáñez del Campo to power in 1927 deepened the policies of persecution against gay people.

Ibanez's dictatorship (1927-1931) was characterized by strong repression of his opponents, many of whom were killed by paramilitary groups. Political prisoners were threatened with "fondeamiento" which consisted of prisoners being thrown from ships at sea with a weight bound to their legs, although there is no definitive evidence that the practice actually occurred. According to popular myth, Ibáñez del Campo was deeply homophobic because his son Carlos was gay, and so executed a series of raids and arrests against homosexuals. The popular story alleges that "fondeamiento" was carried out against captured homosexuals who were embarked at Valparaíso and never seen again. However, there is no archival documentary evidence to support any aspect of this popular myth.

According to historian Leonardo Fernández, these stories originate in events which occurred after the end of Ibáñez's rule. In 1941, during the government of Pedro Aguirre Cerda, prisoners who had been convicted of homosexual offences, or had been identified as homosexual by medical staff or their own admission, were embarked from Valparaíso and sent to a prison in Pisagua, in the north. This had the declared intention of isolating the homosexual prisoners and preventing them from spreading homosexual behaviour to other prisoners. In Pisagua and other locations in the north, oral history retains memories of prison colonies populated by homosexual prisoners.

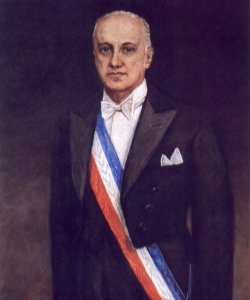
President Jorge Alessandri was the victim of homophobic attacks by some opposition media.

In 1952, when Ibáñez del Campo returned to power, this time in open democratic elections, as president, he continued its repressive policies. During his government he promulgated Law 11625 on Antisocial States and Security Measures (1954) (Ley 11625 sobre Estados Antisociales y Medidas de Seguridad), first proposed during the administration of his predecessor González Videla, a law establishing various security measures (such as healing internments, fines and imprisonment) against groups of "social dangerousness ", including vagrants, drug addicts and homosexuals, among others. This law required the enactment of a regulation that would facilitate its implementation, but that was never issued, so it could not be applied until it was finally repealed in 1994. However, this law would apparently

had a marginal application, with little records of some gay people moved to places like Chanco and Parral.

The former freedom lived in artistic circles and the aristocracy until the 1950s, virtually disappeared as a result of Ibáñez government persecution. One example was the actor Daniel Emilfork, who settled in France. Many preferred to emigrate to Europe and the United States in search of greater freedom.

In subsequent governments, although the repression by the state decreased significantly, it was not in the society. One example was the treatment given by the media to homosexuals or how they used homosexuality as a way of discrediting. The clearest case was lived by the president of Chile between 1958 and 1964, Jorge Alessandri. Alessandri was the first bachelor president in the history of the country, generating a series of rumors in such a conservative country like Chile about their sexuality; the myth of his homosexuality was used by the satirical magazine Topaze and newspaper Clarín, who called right-wing Jorge Alessandri as "The Lady" (La Señora).

In other areas of the country, police abuse and humiliation of homosexuals continued: the best-known case occurred in Antofagasta on 15 June 1969 with the so-called "Huanchaca street scandal", in which several homosexuals were detained until 2 July by participating in a party dressed as women, subsequently suffering various abuses and mistreatment during his stay in jail.

=== Popular Unity and the first gay demonstration ===
Perhaps the most important emblem of media homophobia was Clarín, a popular, sensationalist and left-wing newspaper, which continuously published notes on gay people in a disparaging way, usually titrating with reports of crimes committed by "colipatos", "locas" or "yeguas" as usually they called gay people. This homophobia conducted by the leftist press can be considered as an effect of the idealization of the prototype of man during the years of the Popular Unity, corresponding to the hard worker. Thus, the left visualizes manhood as the ideal of the revolution led by Salvador Allende, while the right took advantage of the image of femininity, visible in pot-banging demonstrations known as cacerolazos; homosexuality therefore was contrary to both conceptions, especially from the political left.

In the late 1960s, urologist Antonio Salas Vieyra and Osvaldo Quijada created the Chilean Society of Anthropological Sexology to improve education on and explore the emerging field of gender. By 1970, they had begun to study the possibility of performing gender corrective surgery to assist people suffering from an identity disorder. That same year, Law No. 17,344 was passed which allowed name changes if a current name created a material or moral impairment, to correct an affiliation not previously known, or in instances in which the person was known by a name other than the one on official documents for more than five years. If a court approved the change, the law required publication in the Official Gazette of a notification of the current names and the new name the party intended to begin using. After publication, third parties could oppose a change during a thirty-day waiting period, before the court was authorized to formalize the name change. In March 1973, Marcia Torres became the first person to obtain a gender correction in Chile and in May applied for a name change. In the first months of the Pinochet dictatorship, Torres was granted a court order to change her name and gender mark in the sex registry and on her official documents.

On 22 April 1973 occurred in the Plaza de Armas in Santiago the first manifestation of gay people in Chile. Nearly twenty-five homosexual and transgender individuals who often walked at night the Huérfanos and Ahumada streets in downtown Santiago gathered to protest abuses by police, which continually jailed them for "indecency and bad manners", beat them and shaved their heads. Despite this repression, the demonstration proceeded normally; however, the media made the attacks through their chronicles. Even the governor of the province of Santiago, Julio Stuardo, said he would use "the security forces and all the springs that the constitutional mandate gives" just to prevent a new demonstration scheduled this time in the capital's high-class neighbourhoods.

=== Military dictatorship (1973–1990) ===
Five other transgender people were found to have changed their names before 1977, per publications in the Official Gazette, but increasingly, Pinochet's regime escalated stigmatization and criminalization of the activities of the LGBT community. Article 365 of the criminal code imposed penalties for male same sex relations and Article 373 contained penalties for moral improprieties. These were defined as behaviors which did not affirm the heterosexual family model or reinforce Catholic values.

During the military dictatorship of Chile, despite violent repression, the first LGBT organizations began to appear, although illegally and hidden. In 1977, a group of homosexuals founded the first gay organization in Chile. The group called Integración organized meetings in private homes, where educational talks about homosexuality were dictated. Despite its quiet performance, the group performed in Santiago the first homosexual congress in Chile in 1982 in a place called El delfín, where about 100 people attended. Founded in 1983, Ayuquelén was the first lesbian organization in Chile and represented for years the only lesbian voice, participating in international meetings and conferences. The group was from the beginning linked to the feminist movement. In 1992 they organized the first National Feminist Lesbian Meeting, where about 50 women from different regions of the country participated. In the late 1980s, in the city of Concepción, emerged the groups SER and Lesbianas en Acción (LEA), the first gay and lesbian organizations in southern Chile.

Some of the only public actions by gay people were through the radical artistic group Las Yeguas del Apocalipsis (The Mares of the Apocalypse), formed in 1987 by the artists Francisco Casas Silva and Pedro Lemebel. They aimed to question the status quo imposed by the dictatorship, and are one of the first examples of an organized political voice from gay Chileans. While the exact origins of the group's name are unknown, it seems to have been inspired by the AIDS epidemic, which inspired imagery of a biblical plague. The group was characterized by controversial acts of political protest. During the proclamation of Patricio Aylwin as Concertación candidate for the presidential election of 1989, Lemebel and Casas unfolded a large banner that said "Homosexuals for change." The ceremony set the beginning of Aylwin's campaign to be Chile's first democratically elected president since Salvador Allende. Las Yeguas del Apocalipsis would go on to participate in other protests during their "reestablishing" of the Casa Central of the University of Chile. This involved riding into the building naked and on horses, intentionally invoking images of Lady Godiva and homosexuality.

=== Return to democracy (1990-present) ===
The return to democracy prompted many social changes and somehow facilitated the founding of different LGBT rights groups, gaining the opportunity to claim for their rights. During this moment of transition, Chilean gay people articulated an organized and militant political voice for the first time. Their main achievement in this decade was the decriminalization of homosexual acts in 1999.

In 1991, in the southern city of Coronel the first officially Chilean Homosexual Congress took place, which was attended by various organizations born during the dictatorship. The first gay organization, the "Movement for Homosexual Liberation" (MOVILH) was founded in June 1991, which would later become one of the main groups of LGBT activism in the country.

In 1992, the Chilean government decided to make the first HIV/AIDS prevention campaigns, despite the rejection of the Catholic Church in Chile. This was used by various groups to put on the table the issue of homosexuality in the country, participating in interviews, newspapers and on television for the first time. On 4 March 1992, human rights organizations called for a march to commemorate the publication of the Rettig Report on human rights violations during the military dictatorship under Augusto Pinochet, between 1973 and 1990. The group MOVILH responded to the call and about ten of its members, with their faces covered and dressed in black, joined the march. The group marched carrying a banner with the message "For Our Fallen Brothers and Sisters, the Homosexual Liberation Movement." The responses varied widely, receiving expressions of support and rejection. In March 1993, during a march organized by the Association of Relatives of Disappeared Detainees, more than 300 homosexuals and transvestites marched for the first time with unveiled face after the return to democracy, achieving great media coverage.

In early 1994, the AIDS prevention commission of MOVILH left the organization and formed the Lambda Center Chile, a parallel gay group that focused its work primarily on AIDS prevention. In the 1996 municipal elections, the first gay candidacies were registered in the communes of Santiago, Concepción and Antofagasta, but without success. In 1997, the Unified Movement of Sexual Minorities (MUMS Chile) was founded with the merger of members of MOVILH and Lambda Center Chile. Meanwhile, the LGBT rights group MOVILH changed its name to "Homosexual Movement of Integration and Liberation".

In June 1999, the first March for Sexual Diversity was held in Santiago, demonstration for the rights of the LGBT community and the fight against homophobia.

Homosexuality in Chile was decriminalised in 1999.

== 21st century ==
=== Zamudio case and anti-discrimination law ===
On March 2012, a 24-year-old gay man called Daniel Zamudio was beaten and tortured in downtown Santiago by four members of a Neo-Nazi gang, which led to his death three weeks later. The media outrage towards the crime helped pass an anti-discrimination law that had been stuck in the Senate floor for seven years, having it be approved on May 2012. The anti-discrimination law, N°20609, is coloquially known as the Zamudio Law.
