= Araia =

Araia may refer to:

- Araia, Álava, a town in Basque Country, Spain
- Francesco Araja (1709–1762/1770), or Francesco Araia, Italian composer
- Semhar Araia (born 1978/1979), Eritrean American social activist, professor, and international lawyer
- Zicu Araia (1877–1948), Aromanian poet, schoolteacher and separatist
- Araya Desta (1945–2021), or Araia Desta, Eritrean diplomat
- ARAIA, Associate of the (Royal) Australian Institute of Architects

== See also ==
- Araya (disambiguation)
