= Araya =

Araya may refer to:

- Araya (name), a surname and given name (including a list of persons with the name)
- Araya (film), a 1959 Venezuelan documentary film
- Arya metre, a poetic meter used in Prakrit and Sanskrit poetry

== Places ==
- Araya, Venezuela, a town in Venezuela
- Araya Fortress, former Spanish fortress in Araya, Venezuela
- Araya Peninsula, a peninsula of Venezuela, on the Caribbean Sea
- Araya, Lebanon, a village southeast of Beirut, Lebanon, twinned with Cholet, France
- Araya, Spain, a town in Álava, Basque Country, Spain
- Araya Station (Gunma), railway station in Gunma, Japan
- Araya Station (Akita), railway station in Akita, Japan
- Araya, Nigeria, a village in the Isoko region of Delta State, Nigeria

== Other uses ==
- Araya (video game), a 2016 horror video game

== See also ==
- Arya (disambiguation)
- Araia (disambiguation)
