= 1978 Huanchaca street scandal =

Huanchaca street scandal
- Date: November 12, 1978
- Time: 0:10
- Location: 352 Huanchaca Street, Antofagasta; 23°38′27″S 70°23′32″W
- Also known as: «Escándalo de la calle Huanchaca»
- Type: Police raid
- Motive: Transvestite party

The Huanchaca street scandal was a raid that took place on 12 November 1978 in the Chilean city of Antofagasta. A party was taking place, and 13 people were arrested, including seven men who were transvestites. The location was the same as a raid in June 1969 that involved members of the club known as "El Anillo Rojo" (The Red Ring).

== History ==
According to press reports at the time, on the night of 11-12 November 1978, a group of people gathered at the house located at 352 Huanchaca Street to celebrate a party to choose the "Queen of Spring" for the club "El Anillo Rojo", which was celebrating its anniversary that day. After complaints from neighbors about the loud music, around midnight a group of police officers went to the house and forcibly entered, arresting seven people who were dressed in women's clothing. Five 17-year-olds and one 16-year-old were also found at the location.

According to information provided by the Carabineros (Chilean police) to the local press, the house housed an illegal liquor store operated by Juan Androver, who was also arrested and fined for illegal possession and sale of alcohol. This information was denied by the residents of the house, who added that the raid and subsequent arrests were carried out without a warrant. The detainees were also charged with "offending public morals and decency" and "corruption of minors" due to the presence of 16- and 17-year-olds at the location.

The news, like the 1969 scandal, made national headlines and was reported by Santiago media outlets, such as El Cronista, which ran the headline "Freaky Party Discovered at the 'Red Circle'" (in Spanish: Descubren Fiesta de “Raros” en el “Círculo Rojo”), alluding to the club to which the detainees belonged and highlighting the similarities with the 1969 raid. It was also mentioned that the block bounded by Huanchaca, Caracoles, Buenos Aires, and Valdivia streets was a regular meeting place for gay men in Antofagasta, and one of those arrested, according to El Mercurio de Antofagasta, explained the origin of the name "The Red Ring":

"(The activities we carry out) are based on passion, and all passion is red like fire".

— El Mercurio de Antofagasta, 13 November 1978

On 27 November 1978, the newspaper La Estrella del Norte published a note sent by a group of residents of Huanchaca Street in which they denied the reports about the scandal, stating that the party was merely a family birthday celebration, and asking for peace and quiet for the residents of Huanchaca 352, mentioning that they were not disturbing the peace of the neighborhood.

== See also ==
- LGBTQ history in Chile
