= Rolando Jiménez =

Chilean activist

Rolando Jiménez is a Chilean gay activist. He is a former president of the Movimiento de Integración y Liberación Homosexual (Movilh).
