= Graciela Araya =

Austrian mezzo-soprano of Chilean birth

Graciela Araya (born 16 May 1962) is an Austrian mezzo-soprano of Chilean birth who has had a prolific international opera career since the early 1980s. Though her repertoire is extensive, her signature part is the title role in Carmen which she has performed over 400 times.

Born in Concepción, Chile, Araya was a voice student of Marta Duran in Santiago and Tomas Demolitsas in São Paulo. She made her stage debut in Santiago in 1981 as Maria in West Side Story. She made her first opera appearance the following year as Enrichetta di Francia in I puritani at the Municipal Theater of Santiago with Cristina Deutekom as Elvira and Carlo Felice Cillario conducting. In 1983 she made appearances at the Theatro Municipal in São Paulo and the Theatro Municipal in Rio de Janeiro.

In 1984, Araya won a scholarship to study and perform at the Deutsche Oper Berlin. She made her European debut with the company that year as Gedankenstimme in the world premiere of Siegfried Matthus's Die Weise von Liebe und Tod des Cornets Christoph Rilke under the direction of Maximilian Schell. After finishing her internship in Berlin, she joined the Aachen Opera where she was committed for two years. She then sang for three years with the Deutsche Oper am Rhein before joining the roster of principal artists at the Vienna State Opera where she was committed for 12 seasons. She became an Austrian citizen while working in Vienna.

As a guest artist, Araya has performed in leading roles with the Royal Opera, London, the Opéra National de Paris, La Monnaie, the Vlaamse Opera, De Nederlandse Opera, La Fenice, the Teatro dell'Opera di Roma, the Teatro Regio in Turin, the Metropolitan Opera, Los Angeles Opera, Seattle Opera, the New National Theatre Tokyo, and the Bregenz Festival among others. Her Carnegie Hall debut was on 4 June 2007 as Zanetto by Pietro Mascagni. She created the role of Donna Maria d'Avalos in the opera Gesualdo by Alfred Schnittke in the Vienna State Opera. 1987 saw her as Orfeo, in Orfeo ed Euridice directed by Peter Werhahn, for which she won the O.E. Hasse-Preis for best young artist in Germany. Other roles she has performed on stage include Amneris in Aida, Charlotte in Werther, Clairon in Capriccio, Concepcion in L'heure espagnole, Dalila in Samson et Dalila, Geschwitz in Lulu, Herodias in Salome, Jocasta in Oedipus rex, Kundry in Parsifal, Laura in La Gioconda, and Venus in Tannhäuser.

== See also ==
- Araya (disambiguation)
