= Carlos Leppe =

Chilean performance artist

- Born: Carlos Francisco Leppe Arroyo; October 9, 1952; Santiago de Chile, Chile
- Died: October 15, 2015; Santiago de Chile, Chile
- Known for: Performance art
- Movement: Escena de Avanzada (Advanced Scene)

Carlos Francisco Leppe Arroyo (October 9, 1952 – October 15, 2015) was notable as a Chilean performance artist. Carlos Leppe's artistic career began with conventional plastic media, but he is recognised as a major exponent, and the originator, of performance art in Chile. The practice of performance art is also known in Chile as 'art actions' (acciones de arte). Leppe used his own body in an artistic practice born of the tension between personal self-identity and the cultural expectations which regulate social behaviour. He was a key figure in the neo-avant-garde ‘Advanced Scene’ (or Escena de Avanzada), which included—among others—the artists Carlos Altamirano, Juan Castillo, Juan Domingo Dávila, Alfredo Jaar and Lotty Rosenfeld, and the writers Diamela Eltit and Raúl Zurita.

== Biography and context ==
Leppe completed his artistic training at the University of Chile, graduating with a specialism in painting. He studied under the tutelage of the visual artists Carlos Altamirano, Eugenio Dittborn and Francisco Smythe and the French-Chilean theorist Nelly Richard, who considered him among the Escena de Avanzada, or 'Advanced Scene' of neo-avant-garde artists. Leppe took inspiration from a number of twentieth-century avant-garde artists, among them Arman, Christo, Joseph Beuys, Lucio Fontana and George Segal. He is associated with object art, body art, and spatial interventions. His career encompassed various roles as art director, image consultant and creative consultant for a number of Chilean, Italian and Spanish companies, including being the director and artistic producer of the national television channel, TVN (Televisión Nacional de Chile).

The early years of the military dictatorship of Augusto Pinochet (1973–1990) generated some of the most deeply critical work in Chilean art. According to Concha Calvo Salanova, “Leppe used the reference points of Conceptualism, such as its hermeticism and precariousness to demonstrate the absolute breakdown of human rights in an extremely repressive dictatorship.” Using his own body, Leppe's actions took aim at social and political injustices suffered under dictatorship, such as the use of torture. An example can be seen in the photo-performance El perchero (The Clothes Rack, 1975), in which the theme of gender, a central axis of his critical vision, was also foregrounded. Calvo Salanova sees the piece as “confront[ing] the question of the representation of living flesh, in a clear reference to tortures used by the Chilean military regime.”

== Notable works ==
- The Happening of the Hens (El happening de las gallinas), 1974, body action
- The Clothes Rack (El perchero), 1975, installation
- Star Action (Acción de la estrella), 1979, body action
- The Singers (Las cantatrices), 1980, video action
- Waiting Room (Sala de espera), 1980, installation
- Twenty-four Hour Illumination (Iluminación durante veinticuatro horas), 1980, installation
- Artist's Proof (Prueba de artista), 1981, body action
- Pietà (La Pietá), 1982, body action
- Artist's Proof (Épreuve d'artiste), 1982, body action
- The Nightingale and the Rose (El ruiseñor y la rosa), 1985, video action
- Mary the Second (María Segundo), 1986, installation
- Chile Lives (Chile vive), 1987, installation
- Plastic Surgery (Cirugía plástica), 1989, body action
- The Shoes (Los zapatos), 2000, body action
- Material Fatigue (Fatiga de material), 2001, body action
- I Am Badly in Love (Soy el mal enamorado), 2002, body action
