= Jesús (2016 film) =

2016 film

- International film poster
- Directed by: Fernando Guzzoni
- Written by: Fernando Guzzoni
- Starring: Nicolás Durán
- Release date: 24 August 2016 (Santiago IFF)
- Running time: 95 minutes
- Countries: France; Chile; Germany; Greece; Colombia
- Language: Spanish

Jesús is a 2016 internationally co-produced drama film directed by Fernando Guzzoni. It was screened in the Discovery section at the 2016 Toronto International Film Festival.

== Plot ==
The film is based partly on the notorious Daniel Zamudio murder case, but the director has developed the story freely from the perspective of one of the culprits and their relationship with their father.

== Cast ==
- Nicolás Durán as Jesús
- Alejandro Goic as Héctor
- Gastón Salgado as Beto
- Sebastián Ayala as Pizarro
- Esteban González as Raúl
- Constanza Moreno as Aylín

== Production ==
The sex scenes in this movie are unsimulated.
