= Nelly Richard =

Chilean art critic (born 1948)

- Born: Nelly Richard; Caen, France
- Occupations: Art critic and curator
- Years active: 20th century
- Notable work: Insubordination of Signs

Nelly Richard (born 1948) is a Chilean cultural theorist and editor of the Revista de crítica cultural. Among her books are The Insubordination of Signs and Cultural Residues.

Critic Jon Beasley-Murray writes in a review of her work that "Nelly Richard has been for over two decades the most tireless campaigner and theorist for the potential and role of art, first in dictatorial and then in postdictatorial Chile, and more broadly in the current neoliberal and postideological condition that first emerged under General Augusto Pinochet but now affects us all."

Richard has been important in disseminating the work of contemporary thinkers and writers such as Beatriz Sarlo, Néstor García Canclini, Jacques Derrida, Ernesto Laclau, Frederic Jameson, Jesús Martín Barbero, and Diamela Eltit throughout Latin America.

Marisol Vera, editorial director of Cuarto Proprio, writes in the introduction to the 1994 edition La insubordinación de los signos that "her texts, and their attendant discussions, enable a field of inquiry that are vital for cultural reflection and critical debate in the post-transition years."

In the introduction to the English translation of La insubordinación de los signos, Alice A. Nelson and Silvia R. Tandeciarz write that Richard's work is located at "the intersection of literary criticism, art history, aesthetics, philosophy, and feminist theory."

== Biography ==
Richard was born in Caen, France in 1948, and studied modern literature at the Paris-Sorbonne University. She moved to Chile in 1970 and became involved in local networks of art criticism and curatorship. Her work included coordinating exhibitions of visual art at the Museo Nacional de Bellas Artes, under the direction of Nemesio Antúnez. She left this post after the violent upheaval of the 1973 Chilean coup d'état.

During the dictatorship of Augusto Pinochet, Richard worked extensively within the Escena de Avanzada art movement whose focus was to confront the military regime's intervention in and censorship of museums, academia, and communications in general. Richard was a key figure in shaping this movement and broadcasting to the outside world. The movement lends its name to an entire section of Márgenes e Instituciones, Arte en Chile desde 1973. Escena de Avanzada was particularly active in national and international expositions, as well as publications, edited and curated by Richard. Among them is the Chilean presence at the 1982 Paris Biennale, the journals CAL and La Separata, and editions from the galleries Cromo and Sur

After the transition to democracy, Richard was founding director of the Revista de Crítica Cultural until it ceased publication in 2008. It was during this period that her work turned to postcolonial thought and gender theory, which further established her as a distinguished figure in the Chilean feminist movement. Richard had previously been one of the primary organizers of the First Congress of Female Latin American Literature held in 1987 in Santiago de Chile.

She was a Guggenheim Fellow in 1996. Between 1997 and 2000, she was director of the Rockefeller Foundation in Chile's program Postdictadura y transición democrática: identidades sociales, prácticas culturales y lenguajes estéticos. She has directed the Editorial Cuarto Propio series Crítica y ensayos, and was an invited researcher at the Museo Nacional Cetro de Arte Reina Sofía en España.

She is currently director of Cultural Studies at Universidad ARCIS, and vice-rector of Outreach, Communications, and Publications. She is a member of Distinguished Professors in Aesthetics Cluster in the Faculty of Arts at the University of Chile, as well as the Advisory Council in the Spanish and Portuguese Department at Princeton University.

== Publications ==
- Campos cruzados. Crítica cultural, latinoamericanismo y saberes al borde, 2009
- Feminismo, Género y diferencia(s) 2008
- "Fugitive Identities and Dissenting Code-Systems: Women Artists During the Military Dictatorship in Chile", in WACK! Los Angeles Museum of Contemporary Art 2007 exhibition catalogue
- Fracturas de la memoria. Arte y pensamiento crítico, 2007
- Intervenciones críticas (Arte, cultura, género y política), 2002
- Residuos y metáforas: ensayos de crítica cultural sobre el Chile de la transición, 1998
- La insubordinación de los signos: cambio político, transformaciones culturales y poéticas de la crisis, 1994
- Masculino / Femenino: prácticas de la diferencia y cultura democrática, 1993
- La estratificación de los márgenes: Sobre arte, cultura y política(s), 1989
- Márgenes e instituciones: Arte en Chile desde 1973, 1987
