= Rayén Araya =

Chilean television and radio commentator (born 1981)

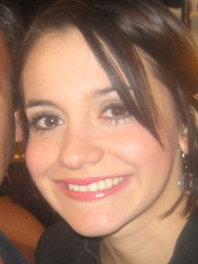
- Born: Macarena Rayén Araya Guerrero; July 2, 1981 (age 45); Santiago, Chile
- Education: University of the Americas (Chile)
- Occupation: Television and radio commentator
- Years active: 1999–present
- Employer: Bío-Bío Comunicaciones
- Spouses: Juan Andrés Ossandón (divorced) Cristobal López (m. 2015)
- Children: Isidora

Rayén Araya (born July 2, 1981 in Santiago de Chile) is a Chilean television and radio commentator. Best known for her work on Bío-Bío Communication's Radio and television news. Also known as co-anchor of news programs on various Chilean television channels.

== Biography ==
Araya was born Macarena Rayén Araya Guerrero in Santiago de Chile, on July 2, 1981. She has one older brother named Manuel. In 1984 her family moved to Panamá until 1998. That year she entered the beauty pageant, where she was one of the finalists.

From 1999 to 2002 she co-hosted the television program Extra Jóvenes on Chilevisión, together with Martín Cárcamo, Paloma Aliaga, and Daniel Valenzuela. The show ran from 1986 to 2002, and some of the previous hosts were Felipe Camiroaga and Claudia Conserva.

In 2001 she worked on the cable channel Zona Latina hosting a musical program, Zona Joven.

From 2002 to 2006 she worked on Canal 13, starting as a musical correspondent and becoming a News co-anchor.

From 2002 to 2011 she worked on Mega, as the news co-anchor in the morning news, Radio Mega, and then in the evening news, Meganoticias Tarde.

At the beginning of 2012 she co-hosted the news in UCV TV, the Central Edition News, with Eduardo Riveros.

By the end of 2012 she started working for Bío-Bío Comunicaciones, on the radio and the television channel of the company: Radio Bío-Bío and Bío-Bío Chile TV. She is the host of the radio and TV programs Agenda Propia and Mesa de diálogo. Also works in Radiograma with Nibaldo Mosciatti.

== Television ==
Year	Title	Role	Notes
1999–2001	Extra Jóvenes	Co-Host	Chilevisión
2002	Zona Joven	Host	Zona Latina
2002–04	Pantalla Abierta	Correspondent	Canal 13
2003	Protagonistas en bruto	Co-Host	Canal 13
2003	Encuentros cercanos	Co-Host	Canal 13
2003	Teletarde	Correspondent	Canal 13
2004	Melomanía	Host	Canal 13 Cable
2005	Te vi en Viña	Correspondent	Canal 13
2006	6PM	Correspondent	Canal 13
2008	Musitronia	Host	TVN
2008	Radio Mega	Co-Host	Mega
2009–11	Meganoticias Tarde	Co-Host	Mega
2012	Noticias Edición Central	Co-Host	UCV TV
2023	Eurovision Song Contest 2023	Commentator	Canal 13
2024	Eurovision Song Contest 2024	Commentator	Zapping Channel

== Web television ==
Year	Title	Role	Notes
2011–present	Mesa de diálogo	Host	El Mostrador TV – Bío-Bío Chile TV
2012–present	Agenda Propia	Host	Bío-Bío Chile TV
2012–present	Comentarios editoriales	Editorialists	Bío-Bío Chile TV

== Radio ==
Year	Title	Radio
–	De local	Radio Carolina
–	Canción animal	Radio Carolina
–	Rallen con Chile	Radio Carolina
–	-	Radio Disney
2012–	Radiograma	Radio Bío-Bío
