= 1969 Huanchaca street scandal =

Huanchaca street scandal
- Date: June 15, 1969
- Time: 3:00
- Location: 352 Huanchaca Street, Antofagasta; 23°38′27″S 70°23′32″W
- Also known as: «Huanchacazo», «Escándalo de la calle Huanchaca»
- Type: Police raid
- Motive: Transvestite party

The Huanchaca street scandal, also known as the Huanchacazo, was a raid that occurred on 15 June 1969 in the Chilean city of Antofagasta. On the occasion, a party was taking place in which 24 homosexuals were arrested, including 9 transgender women, who suffered various abuses and mistreatment by the police.

== History ==
According to the press at the time, around 50 people would have gathered on the night of Saturday, 14 June 1969 for a birthday party in a house with a continuous façade located at 352 Huanchaca street. There was some posters alluding to the party and the sexual orientation of the attendees, which had legends such as "To the fight: we are not men, but we are many" («A la lucha: no somos hombres, pero somos muchas»), "You look like a villager, wham!" («Te encuentro como de pueblo, ¡zas!») "From the fact to the bed there is little stretch" («Del hecho al lecho hay poco trecho») and "Happy birthday wishes you SOLOCH" («Feliz cumpleaños te desea SOLOCH»; the acronym would correspond to "Sociedad Locas de Chile", a term coined by the Chilean tabloid press in the 1950s to refer to homosexuals).

After complaints of annoying noises, made by the residents of the sector, Carabineros personnel —commanded by Lieutenant Sergio Canales Ponce, Deputy First Orlando Ramírez, Cabo Luis Núñez Leiva and Carabinero Mario Ángel— went to the place around at 10:00 p.m. to request to reduce the volume of the music, and later at about 3:00 a.m. on Sunday, 15 June, they returned to the place, accompanied by a patrol commanded by Second Sergeant Manuel Aracena and Cabo Rosalindo González, where they proceeded to arrest and beat the partygoers when several of them were surprised dressed as women; it is also noted that two of the attendees were found naked. Of the approximately 50 partygoers, around half of them fled through the roofs and patios of the adjoining houses, resulting in the final arrest of 24 people; among the attendees was Marcia Torres, who in 1973 became famous when she was the first person in Chile to undergo sex reassignment surgery, and who fled from the police raid in Huanchaca escaping through the roofs of the houses located on the block.

The press reports indicate that elements had also been found that would indicate supposed participation of the assistants in activities of the Movimiento de Izquierda Revolucionaria (MIR), since in the house were some portraits of Che Guevara and a sketchbook containing the expressions «Latin American Colony Antofagasta 69» («Colonia latinoamericana Antofagasta 69») and «For a great Latin American homeland» («Por una gran patria latinoamericana»).

The 24 detainees were taken to the Sixth Police Station on Baquedano street, where they remained all day Sunday without being allowed to change their clothes. At 8:30 on 16 June, the 24 detainees were transferred from the police station to the First Criminal Court of Antofagasta to be formalized; on that occasion, the only cisgender woman in the group was released —Rita López Muñoz, who had indicated that she only arrived at the scene to hand over four wigs—; at 1:00 p.m. the judge allowed the 9 detainees who were dressed in women's clothes to change, and at 1:30 p.m. of the same day the 23 detainees were transferred to the city jail. About 1,500 (according to El Mercurio de Antofagasta) and more than 3,000 (according to La Estrella del Norte) crowded outside the courts to observe and insult the detainees; a caravan of approximately 30 vehicles followed the police van that was taking the detainees to the prison, honking their horns.

During the afternoon of 16 June, 2 detainees were released for lack of merit, while another 12 were released on the morning of the following day. Finally, the 9 transgender women who were still detained, were accused of offenses against morality and good customs and declared criminals, remaining in the Antofagasta Public Prison until 2 July, the date on which the Court of Appeals granted them conditional release on bail, upon payment of 450 escudos, after the allegations made by the lawyer Hugo Soto. After their release, the detainees indicated that during the period in which they were arrested they suffered various abuses and ill-treatment.

== Reactions ==
Given the taboo existing in society at the time, many of the relatives of the detainees only found out at that time about the homosexuality of those close to them who had been arrested. The situation generated a series of comments in the press regarding homosexuality: local newspapers devoted ample space to presenting the opinions of psychiatrists, professors, and lawyers, among others.

The media at the time characterized the police raid as a "scandal": the Antofagasta newspaper La Estrella del Norte, a sensationalist evening paper, headlined its 16 June front page "The greens muddied a crazy, crazy party" («Los verdes embarraron una fiesta loca, loca») with the down "Two danced naked and nine dressed like women" («Dos bailaban piluchitos y nueve vestían como mujeres») and accompanied by a photograph of some of the detainees. El Mercurio de Antofagasta headlined on its inside pages on June 16 "24 detained in sinister orgy of depraved young people" («24 detenidos en siniestra orgía de jóvenes depravados»), while the newspaper La Provincia from Ovalle headlined "50 "maricuecas" guerrillas made their revolution naked" («50 guerrilleros "maricuecas" hacían su revolución desnudos»), emphasizing the alleged link of the detainees with MIR activities. The news transcended the borders of Chile and was published in the French newspaper Le Monde.

The commotion generated in Antofagasta by the Huanchaca street scandal caused the councilor Luis Franco (at that time president of the Municipality's Culture Commission) to ask Judge Juan Sinn Bruno of the Second Court to prohibit the performance of the Blue Ballet drag queen group that would be performed that day at the Latorre Theater for constituting an alleged crime of outrage against good customs; the magistrate denied the request but authorized the Carabineros to monitor the absence of minors under 21 years of age in the aforementioned show.

Nine years later, on 12 November 1978, another raid took place at Huanchaca 352, in which 7 people dressed in women's clothing were arrested, all of them members of a club named "The Red Ring".

== Cultural references ==
On 24 October 2008, the play titled El escándalo de la calle Huanchaca premiered, directed by the Antofagasta journalist and playwright Pedro Arturo Zlatar and with Teresa Ramos as theatrical director, Jorge Wittwer as costume manager, Marko Franasovic in the set designs, Alex Zarricueta in charge of the choreography and the music made by the Merkén group. The work had the support and sponsorship of Amnesty International and the Movement for Homosexual Integration and Liberation (Movilh) in addition to financing through the National Fund for Cultural Development and the Arts (Fondart).

The Huanchaca street scandal is narrated in detail by Eric Goles in his novel El zapato perdido de la Marilyn, published in 2008.

== See also ==
- LGBT history in Chile
