= Zamudio (TV series) =

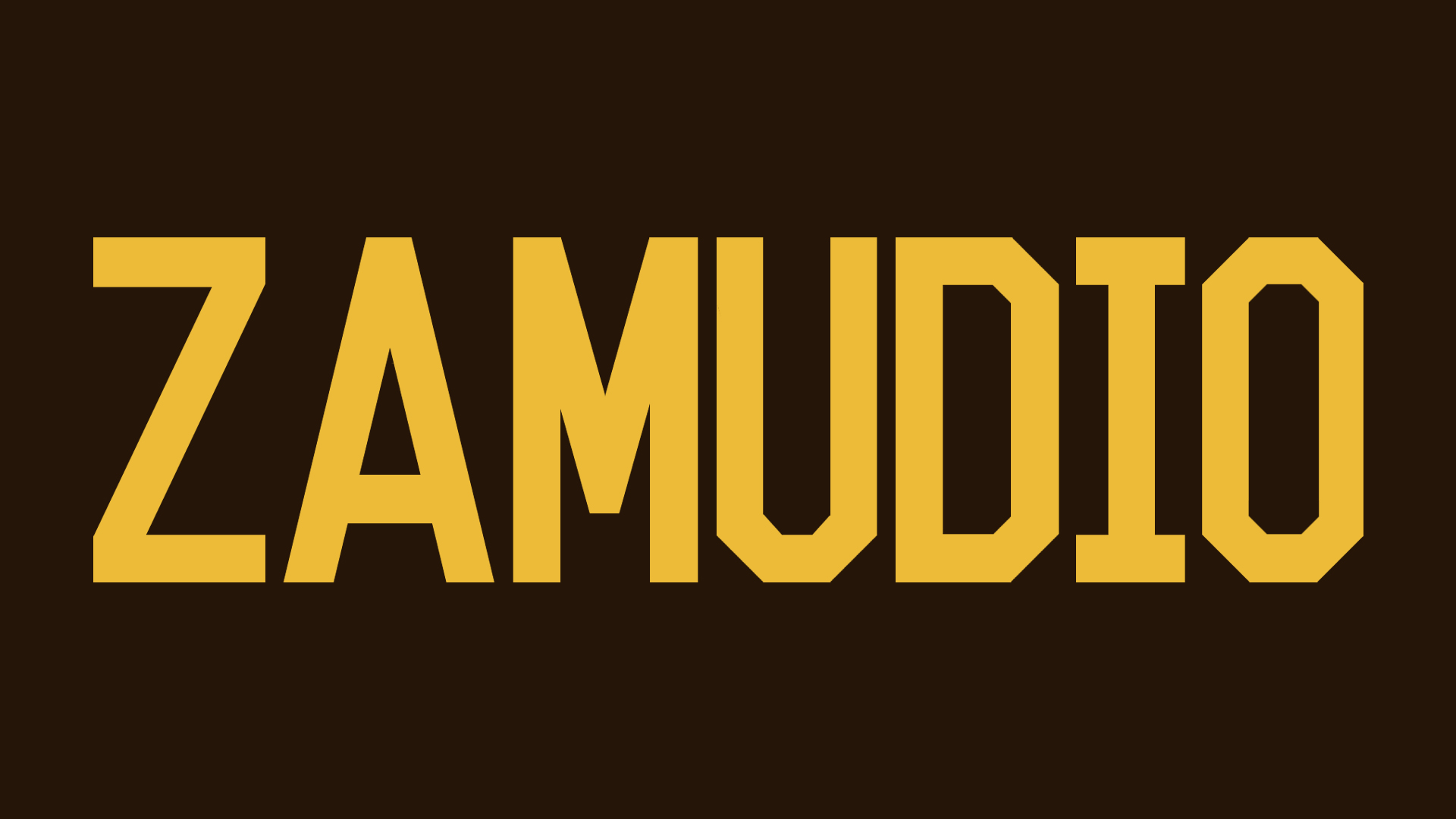
- Also known as: Zamudio: Perdidos en la noche
- Genre: Drama
- Created by: Juan Ignacio Sabatini; Juan Pablo Sallato
- Based on: Solos en la noche: Zamudio y sus asesinos of Rodrigo Fluxá
- Directed by: Juan Ignacio Sabatini
- Starring: Enrique Videla; Paula Del Fierro; Vladimir Rivera
- Opening theme: «Noche profunda» (deep night)
- Composer: Dënver
- Country of origin: Chile
- Original language: Spanish
- No. of seasons: 1
- No. of episodes: 4

Production
- Executive producers: Rony Goldschmied (TVN); Juan Pablo Sallato; Paz Urrutia; Juan Ignacio Sabatini (Villano)
- Production location: Santiago

Original release
- Network: TVN
- Release: March 29 – April 19, 2015

Zamudio: Lost at Night is a Chilean television miniseries produced by Villain Productions for TVN and premiered on March 29, 2015. The series is based on the controversial book "Solos en la Noche: Zamudio y sus asesinos" (Alone in the Night: Zamudio and his murderers), by journalist Rodrigo Fluxá, that describes the homophobic murder of Daniel Zamudio (who was beaten and tortured in the Parque San Borja de Santiago by four other youths, allegedly belonging to a Neo-Nazi gang, in the night of March 2, 2012, with Zamudio dying from his injuries 25 days later). Fluxá presents the hate crime not as a fortuitous event, but as the logical result of the social environment in which both the victim and victimizers lived. It is adapted by Enrique Videla and directed by Juan Ignacio Sabatini. It stars Nicolás Rojas, Michael Silva, Ernesto Meléndez, Sebastián Rivera, Matías Orrego, Omeñaca Jaime, Francisca Gavilán, Daniel Muñoz, Amparo Noguera and Luz Jiménez.

== Plot summary ==
Daniel Zamudio (Nicolás Rojas), a young gay man of humble origins, dreams of a career in television as he frequents the night life in the affluent district of Providencia. A relationship with a wealthy older man makes him believe his goals are within reach, but as the fragile scaffold on which he rests his ambitions collapses, so do his hopes of a better future, which sinks him in a deep depression. Alone and adrift, Daniel gives himself to the night, and after his last bender, his path crosses with the group of four people who would seal his fate.

== See also ==
- Daniel Zamudio
- LGBT rights in Chile
