= Clarín (Chilean newspaper) =

Chilean newspaper

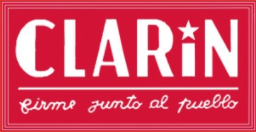

- Front page of Clarín's final number, published on 11 September 1973. Its circulation was minimal as the military intervened Clarín's headquarters during the delivery process
- Type: Daily newspaper
- Format: Tabloid
- Owner(s): Víctor Pey Casado; Fundación Presidente Allende
- Editor: Alberto "Gato" Gamboa (until 1973)
- Founded: 1954
- Ceased publication: 1973; 53 years ago
- Headquarters: Santiago, Chile
- Website: elclarin.cl

Clarín is a Chilean online newspaper, originally published as a print publication between 1954 and 1973, when it was closed following the coup d'état on 11 September. A new edition was published forty years later, on 11 September 2013, in collaboration with El Ciudadano. Clarín's slogan was "Firme junto al pueblo" ("[Staying] strong with the people").

== History ==
Clarín was conceived by journalist Darío Sainte Marie Soruco, known under the pseudonym of Volpone. The newspaper was first published in 1954, competing with evening newspapers Última Hora and La Segunda, but did not succeed; Clarín ended circulation two years later. However, Volpone purchased the rights cheaply and transformed Clarín into a morning paper, specialized in police news, and with cheap printing prices at the workshops of La Nación. The newspaper initially had a print run of 20,000 and 30,000 copies, covering Santiago de Chile and other cities. With its coverage of police news, it managed to sell up to 35,000 and 40,000 copies.

Following the election of Jorge Alessandri as president of Chile, Clarín was expelled from the La Nación workshops, because of Volpone's opinions against Alessandri. Through the 1960s, it transformed into a leftist newspaper. During the presidency of Eduardo Frei Montalva, the newspaper started to be printed again at the workshops of La Nación. Clarin supported the candidacy of the Popular Unity's Salvador Allende for the 1970 elections. Once Allende was elected, the newspaper defended its government, calling to a "class struggle". It was purchased by Victor Pey during the Allende administration and became the largest newspaper in Chile.

The final edition of Clarín circulated on 11 September 1973, the day of the coup d'état in Chile. That day, at 04:00 AM, army troops occupied Clarín's workshops at Dieciocho street, number 263, and impeded the newspaper's distribution. The newspaper was not published again; however, some copies of that day's newspaper managed to be delivered to regions.

In 2008, the State of Chile was condemned to pay an indemnification of ten million dollars for the expropriation of the newspaper. The decision, however, was later revoked.

On 11 September 2013, commemorating the fortieth anniversary of the coup d'état, Clarín released a special edition, in collaboration with the newspaper El Ciudadano.
