= Lost Queens =

- Film poster
- Locas Perdidas
- Directed by: Ignacio Juricic
- Written by: Ignacio Juricic
- Produced by: Mariana Tejos Martignoni
- Starring: Andrew Bargsted; Roxana Campos; Catalina Vásquez Cristi; Rodrigo Pérez; Macarena Lagos; Maite Neira
- Cinematography: Danilo Miranda
- Edited by: Valentina Ruiz Sierra
- Music by: Esteban Gómez; Pablo Álvarez; Roberto Espinoza
- Production companies: Realizadora de Cine y Televisión – Universidad de Chile, Productora Locas Perdidas
- Release date: May 21, 2015 (Cannes Film Festival)
- Running time: 28 minutes
- Country: Chile
- Language: Spanish

Lost Queens, or Locas Perdidas, is a short film by Chilean director Ignacio Juricic Merillán. The film was released at the 2015 Cannes Film Festival, where it was one of 18 short films shortlisted from a list of 1,600 for the Cinéfondation. Lost Queens won the Second Prize.

== Film ==
The film is 28 minutes long. The producer was Mariana Tejos Martignoni.

== Plot ==
In 1996, 18-year-old Rodrigo is arrested by the police in a televised raid on the club where he works as a drag queen. He returns home fearful that his family will see him on the news. While all the family is getting ready for a wedding, he makes plans to run away with the 48-year-old hairdresser Mauricio, a family friend and Rodrigo's boyfriend.

== See also ==
- Cinema of Chile
