= Candy Dubois =

Chilean dancer

Candy Dubois (also known as Candy Santiago and born Candelaria Manso Seguel, August 24, 1942 – May 21, 1995) was a Chilean dancer. She performed with the gender non-conforming group Blue Ballet, and worked with choreographer Paco Mairena.

== Biography ==
Dubois was born as Candelaria Manso Seguel in Santiago on August 24, 1942. She was later raised by her paternal grandparents in Cartagena until she ran away at age ten. She eventually began to work as a dancer and was later discovered by choreographer, Paco Mairena. Mairena convinced Dubois to move to Santiago where she later joined the Blue Ballet, a group of performers who were gender non-conforming. Dubois performed with Blue Ballet for around twenty years, appearing in Chile and in Europe. In Europe, she used the stage name of Candy Santiago. She also performed at the Bim Bam Bum theater in Santiago. In Europe, Dubois underwent sex reassignment surgery. She later married a French man and took the name of Dubois. After touring Europe, Dubois returned to Chile in 1984 and opened a club called Le Trianon.

In 1994, Dubois was diagnosed with lymphatic cancer. Her last performance took place in February 1995 at the Festival de la Canción de Viña del Mar. Dubois died on May 21, 1995.
