= Murder of Daniel Zamudio =

2012 hate crime in Chile

- Victim Daniel Zamudio
- Location: Santiago, Chile
- Date: Attack: 2 March 2012; Zamudio's Death: 27 March 2012; 14 years ago
- Attack type: Torture murder, hate crime, anti-gay attack, beating, slashing, burning
- Weapon: Various
- Victims: Daniel Mauricio Zamudio Vera, aged 24
- Perpetrators: Patricio Ahumada Garay; Alejandro Angulo Tapia; Raúl López Fuentes; Fabián Mora Mora
- Motive: Homophobia/gayphobia
- Verdict: All four guilty
- Convictions: Qualified homicide
- Sentence: Ahumada: Life imprisonment with the possibility of parole after 20 years Angulo and López: 15 years in prison Mora: 7 years in prison

Daniel Mauricio Zamudio Vera (3 August 1987 – 27 March 2012) was a Chilean man whose murder in 2012 became a symbol against homophobic violence in Chile. Zamudio, who identified as gay, was beaten and tortured for several hours in San Borja Park in downtown Santiago on March 2, 2012, by four attackers linked to a neo-Nazi gang. His death and the subsequent media attention helped accelerate legislation against discrimination and opened doors to greater acceptance and tolerance of differences in the conservative country.

In 2013, all four perpetrators were found guilty of first-degree murder and sentenced to prison terms ranging from 7 years to life.

== Murder ==
Zamudio's parents have stated that he was previously subjected to violence due to his sexual orientation. On March 2, 2012, Zamudio was brutally attacked and beaten for six hours until he lost consciousness. He was taken to the Hospital Emergency Public Assistance in Santiago, where he was diagnosed with traumatic brain injury, a broken leg, and cuts on his stomach that resembled swastikas made with broken bottles. Additionally, cigarette burns were found on various parts of his body. Zamudio died from his injuries 25 days later at the same hospital in Santiago.

== Aftermath ==
Funeral of Daniel Zamudio (video)

Following Zamudio's death, Chilean President Sebastián Piñera urged parliament to speed up the adoption of a hate crimes law that had been stagnant for over seven years. The law aimed to prohibit discrimination based on "race, ethnicity, religion, sexual orientation, gender, appearance, or disability." However, adoption of the law faced opposition from several churches, who argued that it could lead to the legalization of same-sex marriage. Despite this, the law was passed in July 2012, signed by the President, and entered into force.

== Murder trial ==
On October 17, 2013, all four men were found guilty of qualified homicide. Judge Juan Carlos Urrutia declared Patricio Ahumada Garay, Alejandro Angulo Tapia, Raúl López Fuentes, and Fabian Mora Mora guilty of a crime of "extreme cruelty" and "total disrespect for human life." On October 28, Ahumada was sentenced to life imprisonment, which was met with cheers from the courtroom. Angulo and López received 15-year sentences, while Mora, the youngest of the group, was sentenced to 7 years due to his cooperation with investigators and lack of prior convictions.

== See also ==
- LGBT rights in Chile
- LGBT in Chile
- Nazism in Chile
- Films and series based on it:
  - Zamudio: Lost at Night (2015)
  - Jesús (2016)
  - You'll Never Be Alone (2016)
