= Adolfo Couve =

Chilean artist (1940–1998)

Adolfo Couve Rioseco (March 28, 1940 – March 11, 1998) was a Chilean artist and writer.

Couve was born in Valparaíso, Chile, the first child of three. In his first years, he lived in Llay-Llay and then moved with his family to Santiago. He entered the Jesuit San Ignacio School, where he finished high school in 1958.

Couve married Martita Carrasco with whom he had a daughter named Camila. The couple separated later. Adolfo Couve lived his last years accompanied by Carlos Ormeno.

Couve began his art studies at the Escuela de Bellas Artes, where he was a pupil of Professor Augusto Eguiluz. He lived in Paris on a fellowship from 1962 to 1963. He studied at the Ecole de Beaux Arts. Later on he moved to New York and studied at the Art's Student League. In this last city, he had his first exhibition in an uptown gallery.

Back in Chile, Couve became professor of art at the Universidad de Chile, where he taught until his death. He was also professor at the Pontificia Universidad Católica de Chile between 1974 and 1981.

After 1971 Cuove took a major interest in literature and published a number of literary works which literary critics would later categorize as a distinctive form of "descriptive realism". After a decade of almost complete devotion to literature he rediscovered his painting which he used as a parallel tool in expressing his views on life and the world.

Although Couve gained considerable fame as a painter, his greatest achievements are thought to be his literary works, which include ten volumes of novels, novellas, and short stories.

Couve killed himself on the morning of March 11, 1998, in his house in Cartagena.

== Literary works ==
- Alamiro (1965)
- En los desórdenes de junio (1974)
- El picadero (1974)
- Tren de cuerda (1976)
- La lección de pintura (1979)
- El pasaje (1989)
- La copia de yeso (1989)
- El cumpleaños del señor Balande (1991)
- El balneario (1993)
- La comedia del arte (1995)
- Cuarteto de infancia (1997)
- Cuando pienso en mi falta de cabeza (La segunda comedia) (1998).
