= Zuliana Araya =

Chilean politician activist

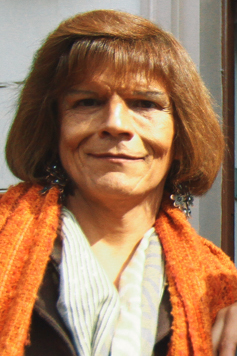
- Born: August 13, 1964 (age 61); Valparaíso, Chile
- Other names: Zuliana Alejandra Araya Gutiérrez
- Known for: LGBTQ activism, politician

Zuliana Alejandra Araya Gutiérrez (born August 13, 1964) is a Chilean politician and transgender rights activist. She has served as a Valparaíso city council, and president of the Afrodita union. She is Chile's first trans city council member.

== History ==
Araya's political career began in 2001 when she assumed the regional presidency and a founder of the Afrodita union, the first transgender union group in Chile.

She ran for Valparaíso city council for the first time in 2004. She is a member of the Party for Democracy (PPD). Araya was elected in 2012, for the term period of 2012 to 2016; and then she was elected for a second time in 2016, for the term period 2016 to 2020.

In July 2012, she legally changed her name to "Zuliana Araya". In December 2019, she was able to have sex reassignment surgery, due to a new Gender identity law (Chile).
