= Marcia Torres =

- Torres in the foreground, costumed as a vedette
- Born: Alberto Arturo Torres Mostajo; 1950; Antofagasta, Chile
- Died: 2011 (aged 60–61); Antofagasta, Chile
- Other name: Marcela Alejandra Torres Mostajo
- Occupations: hairstylist and entertainer
- Years active: 1967–2011

Marcia Torres (Marcia Alejandra Torres Mostajo; 1950–2011) was the first person to obtain sex reassignment surgery in Latin America. Torres established a successful hair styling business in Antofagasta, Chile, before she learned of the successful gender corrective operation of Christine Jorgensen and the pioneering work in sexuality by Antonio Salas Vieyra and Osvaldo Quijada in Chile. Torres contacted Salas and Quijada, was examined by medical experts, and subsequently underwent the procedure in March 1973.

After her surgery, Torres became a cabaret star, performing as a vedette in clubs in Chile and abroad before returning to her home town and resuming her career as a stylist. Her history is illustrative of changing discourses on gender and sexuality, as well as informative in the debates on identity law and the basic human rights of LGBT citizens.

== Early life ==
Marcia Alejandra Torres Mostajo was born as Alberto Arturo Torres Mostajo in 1950 in Antofagasta, Chile. Torres' mother, Fresia Mostajo, was a homemaker and her father was a miner and member of the copper mining union. The only boy with two younger sisters, Torres was effeminate from a very young age and played with her sisters' dolls, whose hair she enjoyed styling. Between ages 12 and 13, Torres became aware that the image of her body in her mind did not match her physical appearance. Speaking of this time in a 2007 interview, Torres said that it was very complex because though she knew she was a girl, she wanted her breasts to develop, hips to widen, and hair to grow long.

Attending the Liceo de Hombres in Antofagasta, Torres left before completing middle school in 1965 as a result of bullying by her classmates. She wanted to study hair styling, but her father pressed to send Torres into military training, to which Torres' mother objected. To continue her education, Torres read magazines and newspapers from her father's extensive library. In 1968, she read an article in Reader's Digest about Christine Jorgensen, an American, who had undergone sex reassignment surgery in Denmark. From the article Torres learned that preoperatively Jorgensen had undergone treatment with estrogen therapy and she began self-administering large doses of contraceptives, obtained with the help of a younger sister. Torres began using the name Marcela, the same name as one of her sisters, whose identification papers she often used.

== Career ==
By the time Torres was 17, she had built up a clientele for her hair business and earned a reputation for her skill with hair coloring. She also began to meet other homosexuals and organize clandestine parties where those that wanted could dress as women. One day a friend from one of those parties brought a client who was reluctant to approach other stylists. He worked with the Blue Ballet, a dance troupe of exclusively transvestite or drag dancers. The company, which featured Candy Dubois, performed in mining cities and at the well-known Bim Bam Bum Revue in Santiago. The stylist, who typically did the wigs for the ballet, was ill and had remained in Santiago. The client needed the dancers' wigs combed and styled urgently for a show the following day and showed Torres pictures of what was needed. Working from 5 a.m. to 5 p.m., Torres finished all 15 wigs.

The dance troupe was happy with the work and their engagement in Antofagasta was extended. When the company prepared to leave, they invited Torres to accompany them to Calama for a month-long engagement. When that show concluded, Torres was asked to join them on a tour throughout Bolivia and Peru. As she was still a minor, Torres' mother convinced her husband to provide signed authorization allowing Torres to join the Blue Ballet. Torres returned to Antofagasta in 1970.

Torres underwent sexual reassignment surgery in Santiago in March 1973 and a followup procedure a few months later, before returning to work. By 1975, she was working as a vedette, gaining star status at the Bim Bam Bum and Teatro Picaresque in Santiago and the El Dorado and El Crazy clubs of Antofagasta. She traveled throughout Europe and visited Egypt to see the pyramids. She worked for several seasons in Brazil and Spain, before returning to work in her hair salon in Antofagasta.

== Transition ==
=== Contact and diagnosis ===
In 1971, Torres read a newspaper article about urologist Antonio Salas Vieyra, who was studying the possibility of performing a surgery to effect a sex change. Salas and Osvaldo Quijada had created the Chilean Society of Anthropological Sexology in the late 1960s hoping to use the operation to help people who had an identity disorder. Torres exchanged letters with Quijada and Salas explaining her desire to have the surgical procedure performed. Accompanied by her mother, Torres went to Santiago and underwent a series of physical, psychiatric and psychological examinations administered by doctors from the medical staff of the University of Chile. She was diagnosed with pseudohermaphroditism, which the Chilean weekly Vea explained meant that Torres was genetically male but psychically female.

=== Legal groundwork ===
Once the doctors cleared Torres for the surgery, lawyers were consulted to determine whether there were any legal impediments. As there was no specific law that addressed surgical genital modification in Chile at that time, it was determined that a judge would have the discretionary authority to rule on any case presented to the court regarding a change to the sex registry. During the presidency of Salvador Allende, there was also a gap in the legal code which allowed people to change their names, if their name diminished their identity ("menoscabara su identidad"). Law No. 17,344, passed on 22 September 1970, allowed name changes if a current name created a material or moral impairment, to correct an affiliation not previously known, or in instances in which the person was known by a name other than the one on official documents for more than five years. If a court approved the change, the law required publication in the Official Gazette of a notification of the current names and first and surname the party intended to begin using. After publication, a thirty-day waiting period for third parties to oppose the change had to lapse before the court was authorized to formalize the name change.

=== Surgery ===
In March 1973, Torres underwent a sex reassignment surgery at the San Borja Arriarán Hospital in Santiago. The procedure was led by Salas, and the operating physician was Dr. Cáceres. It was the first such surgery performed in Latin America.

=== Aftermath ===
After completing her surgery, Torres applied to the court on 1973, for her documents to be changed on the basis of material impairment, as her biological sex no longer matched her identification documents. On 5 December 1973, the court ordered publication of her name change and gender mark requests, which appeared in the journal on 2 May 1974. Following the publication, extensive news coverage was given to the event, and articles about sexuality appeared in legal, medical, and psychiatric journals, evaluating the procedure and advocating for categorization, classification, and education on sexuality. Sensationalized media stories argued whether Torres was a homosexual, discussing whether or not, that as she had never felt like a man, she could have been attracted to someone of the same sex.

After the coup d'état of 1973, the dictatorship of Augusto Pinochet began adopting policies which criminalized and marginalized the activities of the homosexual and transsexual community, escalating social stigmatization and insecurity among her population, which was denied health benefits and health education. Article 365 of the criminal code imposed penalties for same sex relations between men and Article 373 established penalties for moral improprieties which did not reinforce Catholic values and affirm the heterosexual family model for society. In the early part of the dictatorship, the regime and the press characterized sex reassignment surgery as a means of regulating public spaces, since many LGBT people were engaged in sex work and nightlife entertainment, which in effect would allow people to move from an illegal identity to a legal one. Before 1977, there were five other cases of transgender people obtaining a reassignment surgery and name change, published in the Official Gazette.

Despite the difficulties, over the next ten years, Torres underwent numerous additional surgeries and treatments to complete her transformation. Her friend, Pedro Lemebel, said that she was treated like a guinea pig for medical experimentation.

== Death and legacy ==
Torres died on 8 January 2011 in Antofagasta and her ashes were scattered at La Portada.

Torres' life is a window into the changing discourses on gender and sexuality, as well as debates on identity law and the basic human rights of LGBT citizens. The Gender Identity Law, enacted in 2019, recognizes the right to self-perceived gender identity and allows people over 14 years to change their name and gender in documents without prohibitive requirements. Torres' history has been an important foundational element in the struggle for transgender rights in Chile, paving the way for Andrés Rivera Duarte and a transgender woman in 2007 to legally change their name and gender in legal documents with surgery being a non-factor.
