= Movilh =

Chilean LGBT advocacy organization

Homosexual Movement of Integration and Liberation
- Movimiento de Integración y Liberación Homosexual
- Abbreviation: Movilh
- Legal status: Foundation
- Headquarters: 1410 Coquimbo
- Location: Santiago, Chile
- President: Rolando Jiménez
- Website: www.movilh.cl

The Homosexual Movement of Integration and Liberation (Spanish: Movimiento de Integración y Liberación Homosexual; Movilh) is a Chilean human rights advocacy organization in Chile which focuses on civil rights and liberties for lesbian, gay, bisexual and transgender citizens.

== History ==
There is controversy regarding the date of foundation of the organization, since they indicate as such 28 June 1991; however, this corresponds to the creation of the Homosexual Movement of Liberation (Movimiento de Liberación Homosexual), which also used the acronym Movilh, which in 1997 merged with other organizations to create the Unified Movement of Sexual Minorities (Movimiento Unificado de Minorías Sexuales, MUMS), formally constituted on 28 June 1998. At the end of 1999, a splinter group of said group –led by Rolando Jiménez, who had been expelled from the first Movilh in 1995– created the Homosexual Movement of Integration and Liberation, which adopted the acronym Movilh.

It led the campaign to the eventually-successful repeal of sodomy from the list of punishable acts under Article 365 of the Criminal Code in 1999. It also persuaded the judiciary to reopen the case regarding the 1993 Divine nightclub fire in Valparaíso, which killed 16 patrons; the case was finally closed in 2010 with the owner of the club, Nelson Arellano, being solely blamed for the fire and deaths on the basis of homophobia, but Arellano was not prosecuted. The organization's work to draw attention to this and similar cases has put pressure on the Chilean Government to act on passing an anti-discrimination law.
