= List of Chilean women writers =

This is a list of women writers who were born in Chile or whose writings are closely associated with that country.

== A ==
- Marjorie Agosín (1955–2025), Chilean-American poet, memoirist, now lives in the United States
- Isabel Allende (born 1942), highly acclaimed Chilean-American novelist, journalist, columnist, magazine editor, children's writer
- Marina Arrate (born 1957), poet, psychologist
- Celinda Arregui (1864–1941), feminist politician, writer, teacher, suffrage activist
- Carmen Arriagada (1807–1888), letter writer, wrote in English and French

== B ==
- Maipina de la Barra (1834–1904), first Chilean woman to publish a travel journal
- Pía Barros (born 1956), short story writer and novelist
- María Luisa Bombal (1910–1980), acclaimed novelist, feminist
- Martina Barros Borgoño (1850–1944), autobiographer, early feminist
- Marta Brunet (1897–1967), novelist, short story writer

== C ==
- Elena Caffarena (1903–2003), politician, women's rights activist, non-fiction writer
- Mariana Callejas (1932–2016), writer and DINA agent
- Mabel Condemarín (1931–2004), educator, textbook writer, children's writer
- Ivonne Coñuecar (born 1980), writer, poet, journalist
- Mariana Cox Méndez (1871–1914), novelist, short story writer, columnist, feminist
- María de la Cruz (1912–1995), suffragist, journalist, poet, novelist, magazine editor

== D ==
- Achta Saleh Damane (fl. 2010s), journalist and politician
- Delia Domínguez (1931–2022), poet
- Gloria Dünkler (born 1977), poet and librarian

== E ==
- Diamela Eltit (born 1947), educator, novelist
- Gabriela Etcheverry (born 1946), writer living in Canada

== F ==
- Soledad Fariña Vicuña (born 1943), widely translated poet
- María Luisa Fernández (1870–1938), writer, editor, and poet
- Paulina Flores (born 1988), short story writer

== G ==
- María Elena Gertner (1932–2013), writer, actress
- Isabel Gómez Muñoz (born 1959), poet
- Olga Grau (born 1945), writer, professor, philosopher
- Mariela Griffor (born 1961) poet, editor, publisher, diplomat
- Carla Guelfenbein (born 1959), novelist, screenwriter
- Viviana Guzmán (born 1964), flutist, poet

== J ==
- Andrea Jeftanovic (born 1970), novelist, short story writer, essayist
- Pamela Jiles (born 1960), investigative journalist, poet, television presenter

== M ==
- Carmen Marai (Carmen María Bassa Rodríguez, living) poet and novelist
- Lina Meruane (born 1970), writer and professor
- Gabriela Mistral (1889–1957), pen name of Lucila Godoy Alcayaga (1889–1957), winner of the Nobel Prize in Literature, poet, educator, feminist
- María Olivia Mönckeberg (born 1944), journalist, essayist, and academic
- Yolanda Montecinos (1927–2007), journalist, television presenter
- Nicolasa Montt (1857–1924), poet
- Isabel Morel (1885–?), journalist, magazine editor, feminist
- Henrietta Müller (1846–1906), Chilean-British journalist, feminist
- Rosabetty Muñoz (born 1960), poet and professor

== O ==
- Raquel Olea (born 1944), writer, professor
- Rosario Orrego (1834–1879), journalist, novelist, publisher

== P ==
- Marcela Paz, pen name of Esther Huneeus Salas de Claro (1902–1985), children's writer, creator of Papelucho
- Josefa de los Dolores Peña y Lillo Barbosa (1739–1823), letter writer, poet
- Magdalena Petit (1903–1968), popular novelist, playwright, essayist, biographer
- Monica Pidgeon (1913–2009), Chilean-British editor of Architectural Design
- Trinidad Piriz, playwright

== R ==
- Carmen Rodríguez (born 1948), Chilean-Canadian poet, short story writer, educator,
- Winétt de Rokha, pen name of Luisa Anabalón Sanderson (1892–1951), poet

== S ==
- Lake Sagaris (born 1956), Canadian journalist, non-fiction writer, poet, translator, now living in Chile
- Elvira Santa Cruz Ossa (1886–1960), playwright, novelist, magazine editor
- Raquel Señoret (1922–1990), poet
- Elisa Serrana (1930–2012), novelist
- Marcela Serrano (born 1951), novelist
- Marcela Del Sol, (born 1973), writer
- Amelia Solar de Claro (1836–1915), poet, playwright, and essayist
- Pilar Sordo (born 1965), psychologist, columnist, lecturer, and writer

== U ==
- Lucrecia Undurraga Solar (1841–1901), publisher, writer, journalist
- Matilde Urrutia (1912–1985), memoirist

== V ==
- Mercedes Valdivieso (1924–1993), pioneering feminist writer, novelist, author of La Brecha
- Patricia Verdugo (1947–2008), investigative journalist, human rights activist, non-fiction writer
- Luz de Viana (1900–1995), feminist writer also known as Marta Villanueva

== W ==
- Brígida Walker (1863–1942), educator, non-fiction writer
- Teresa Wilms Montt (1893–1921), poet, novelist, feminist

== Y ==
- María Flora Yáñez (1898–1982), novelist and short story writer

== See also ==
- List of women writers
- List of Spanish-language authors
