= Juan Pablo Sutherland =

Chilean writer and LGBT activist

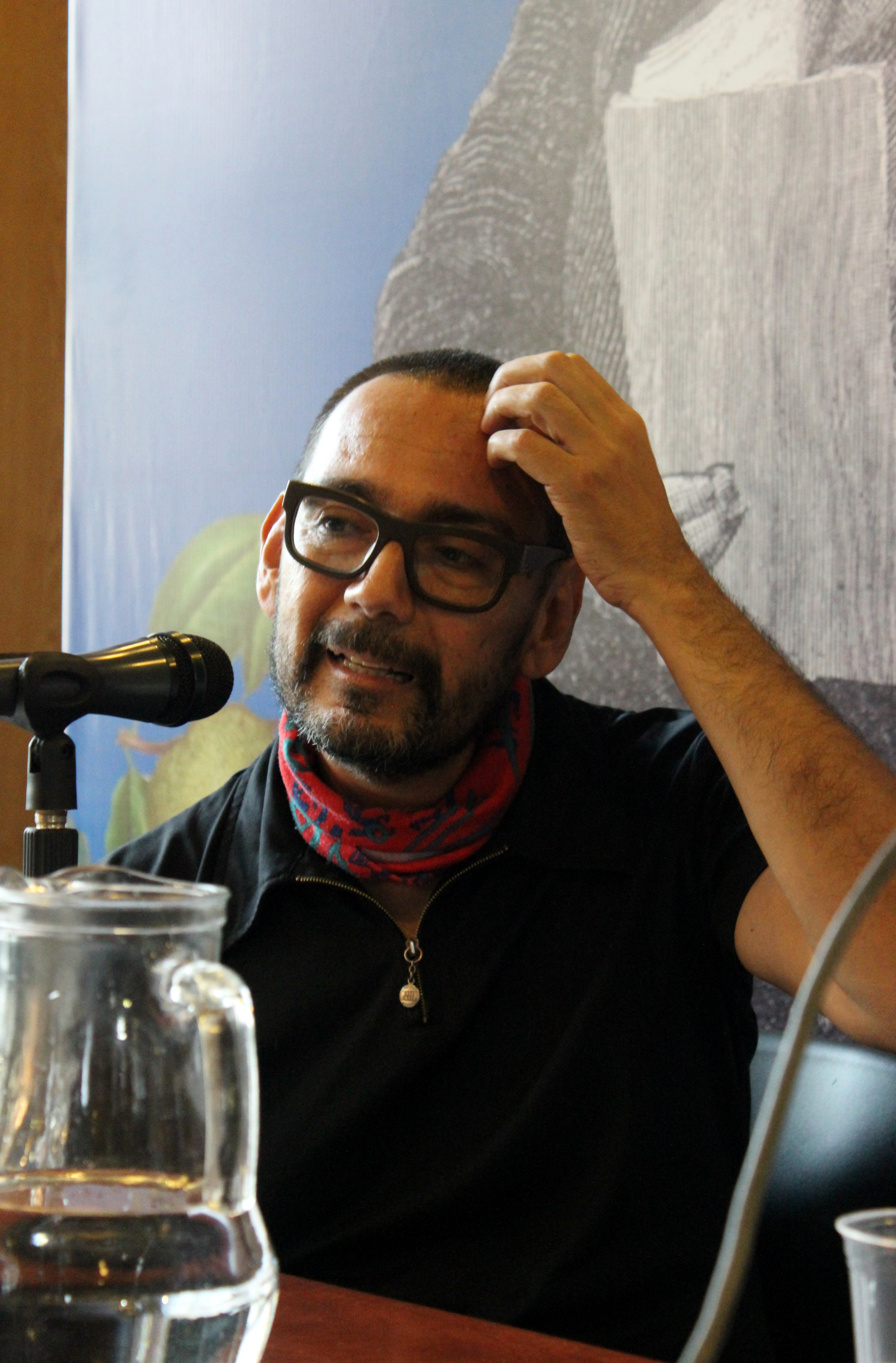
- Sutherland in 2018
- Born: Juan Pablo Sutherland Poblete; July 5, 1967 (age 59); Santiago de Chile, Chile

Juan Pablo Sutherland Poblete (born 5 July 1967) is a Chilean writer and LGBT activist, renowned for his narrative focused on sexual diversity in Chile.

== Early life ==
Juan Pablo Sutherland Poblete studied social communication and obtained his master's degree in cultural studies in 2011 from ARCIS University, where he also taught in the bachelor's degree program in Latin American Literature. Since 2008, he has taught the course "Critical approaches in literature, queer studies, gender and culture technologies" in the master's program in the Faculty of Social Sciences of the University of Chile.

== Literary career ==
Sutherland took part in the literary workshops organized by several Chilean writers such as Antonio Skármeta, Marco Antonio de la Parra, and Poli Délano. His first short stories were published in the anthologies Cuentistas Taller Artecien (1990) and Santiago Pena Capital (1991).

In 1993 Sutherland obtained funding from National Fund for the Development of Culture and Arts to publish his first book, Ángeles negros (Black Angels), which was released by Editorial Planeta in August of the following year. The book generated controversy in Chile at the time of its publication due to its explicit content and its depictions of homosexual encounters. The author referenced places in Santiago de Chile where homosexuals commonly gathered, such as Parque Forestal (Forest Park), Quasar nightclub, and parties with LGBT themes. Conservatives questioned as to why a book with homosexual themes and explicit sexual content was financed with public money, to which Sutherland responded by accusing his critics of attempting censorship.

In 2002, Sutherland published A corazón abierto: geografía literaria de la homosexualidad en Chile (Open Heart: A Literary Geography of Homosexuality in Chile), a compilation of Chilean literary texts that have addressed sexual diversity since the 1920s. The book examines texts by several Chilean authors including Armando Méndez, Benjamín Subercaseaux, Carlos Iturra, Francisco Casas Silva, Enrique Lihn, Hernán Díaz Arrieta, Joaquín Edwards Bello, José Donoso, Jorge Marchant, Luis Oyarzún, María Carolina Geel, María Elena Gertner, Marta Brunet, Mauricio Wacquez, Nelson Pedrero, Pablo Simonetti, Pedro Lemebel, René Arcos, and Ramón Griffero. Sutherland also planned to include texts by Gabriela Mistral and Enrique Lafourcade. However, the foundation that administers the literary estate of the Nobel Prize winner, Mistral, refused permission and he encountered opposition from Lafourcade to include Lafourcade's works.

In 2010, Sutherland was invited by several educational institutions in the United States including University of Pittsburgh, University of Texas at Austin, and Harvard University to present his scholarly work.

=== Literary works ===
- Ángeles negros, Editorial Planeta, Santiago, 1994.
- Santo Roto, LOM, Santiago, 1999.
- A corazón abierto: geografía literaria de la homosexualidad en Chile, Editorial Sudamericana, 2001.
- Nación Marica: Prácticas culturales y crítica activista, Ripio Ediciones, 2009.
- Se te nota, Editorial Los Perros Románticos, Santiago, 2018.
- Papelucho gay en dictadura, Alquimia, Santiago, 2019.
- Grindermanías. Del ligue urbano al sexo virtual, Alquimia, Santiago, 2021.
- Lemebel sin lemebel, Alquimia, Santiago, 2024.

== LGBT activism ==
Sutherland was a member of Movimiento de Liberación Homosexual (Homosexual Liberation Movement), which was founded in 1991 and later merged into the Movimiento por la Diversidad Sexual (Unified Movement of Sexual Minorities) in 1998. He was one of the spokespersons of the organization, and took part in the first press conference held by the collective on 28 February 1993. He was part of Triángulo abierto (Open triangle), the first radio program aimed exclusively at LGBT audiences. It was hosted by Victor Hugo Robles and Soledad Suit, and first aired on 15 June 1993 in Radio Tierra. He also served as one of the producers of the radio program. In 1997, he was invited by the Barcelona City Council and the Front d'Alliberament Gai de Catalunya (Gay Liberation Front of Catalunya) to participate in the seminar "Gai i Lesbià a les portes del Segle XXI" (Gay and Lesbian at the beginning of the 21st century).[ 6]

After the reorganization of the Chilean LGBT groups in 1998, Sutherland severed on the board of directors of the Unified Movement of Sexual Minorities (MUMS). As part of that group, he was one of the organizers of the Mes de la Patria Gay (Gay Homeland Month) in September 2000 that sought to establish a new date of commemoration of Chilean LGBT Pride as an alternative to the 28 June celebration promoted by Movimiento de Integración y Liberación Homosexual (Homosexual Integration and Liberation Movement).
