= Ángeles negros =

Collection of short stories by Juan Pablo Sutherland

- Author: Juan Pablo Sutherland
- Original title: Ángeles negros
- Language: Spanish
- Subject: Homosexuality
- Genre: Short story
- Publisher: Planeta
- Publication date: 1994
- Publication place: Chile
- Pages: 150
- ISBN: 978-9-563-17232-4

Ángeles Negro (English: Black Angels) is the first book by Chilean writer Juan Pablo Sutherland. Published in 1994, it contains seven stories that explore homosexuality in Santiago de Chile. It was the first openly LGBT-themed book to receive funding from the National Fund for the Development of Culture and Arts (FONDART), which sparked controversy upon its publication.

== Synopsis ==
The book consists of seven short stories featuring different characters. Through these stories, the author, Juan Pablo Sutherland, explores various aspects of homosexuality. The seven stories featured in the book include Catedral 1990 (Cathedral 1990), Como si fuera otro (As if it were another), Ángel con las alas rotas (Angel with broken wings), Esperando a la Antonia (Waiting for Antonia), Los pantera rosa (The Pink Panther), Ángeles negros (Black Angels), and Santiago 2010.

The first story, Catedral 1990, was described by writer Pepe Arévalo as "filled with erotic fire". Part of Los pantera rosa is set in Barcelona. The last story, Santiago 2010, depicts, through a futuristic vision, what the Chilean society might look like in that year.

== Publishing and reception ==
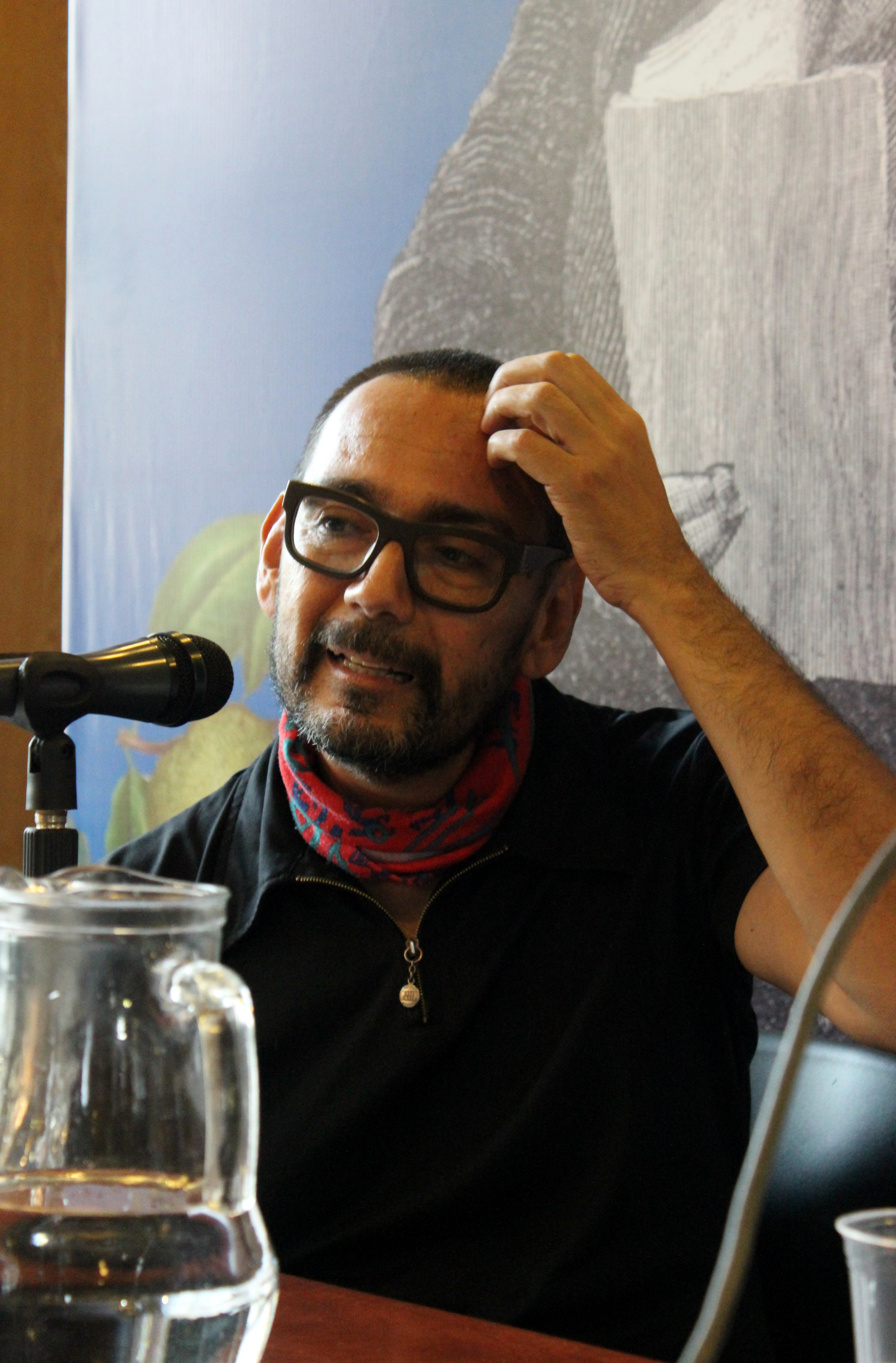
The author, Juan Pablo Sutherland

In 1993 Sutherland obtained funding from National Fund for the Development of Culture and Arts (FONDART) to publish the book, which was released by Editorial Planeta in August of the following year.

The book generated controversy in Chilean society at the time of its publication due to its explicit content and its depictions of homosexual encounters. The author referenced places in Santiago de Chile where homosexuals commonly gathered, such as Parque Forestal (Forest Park), Quasar nightclub, and parties with LGBT themes. Given that situation, conservatives also questioned as to why a book with homosexual themes and explicit sexual content was financed with public money, to which Sutherland responded by accusing his critics of attempting censorship.

Pepe Arévalo, from Punto Final magazine, praised the way this author "describes male beauty with a language worthy of the pictorial hyperrealism of Claudio Bravo". Camilo Marks noted that the stories "would be unbearable pornography if they were poorly written, but, in general, Sutherland shows a fun and colloquial style, with many successful moments and well-written passages", though he also criticized the book's monotony. Eduardo Guerrero del Río, writing for La Segunda, called the stories "monotonous" and "heavily focused on sex from the gay perspective, but without notable strengths in narrative structure or in the necessary mastery of a genre that should produce a stronger impact from its opening lines".

Mariano Aguirre wrote in the newspaper La Nación that the short story Catedral 1990 is "without a doubt the best crafted, where the subject has a more subtle concreteness, [while] the others remain focused on bodies and spaces", while Martín Ruiz, writing in the same newspaper, pointed out that "the greatest criticism that can be made of Ángeles negros is the lack of depth in its characters".
