= Las Yeguas del Apocalipsis =

Chilean artist duo

The Mares of the Apocalypse
- Las Yeguas del Apocalipsis
- Born: Pedro Mardones Lemebel; Francisco Casas Silva; November 21, 1952 (Lemebel); January 19, 1959 (age 67) (Casas)
- Died: January 23, 2015 (aged 62) (Lemebel)
- Years active: 1987–1993
- Known for: Provocative public performance dealing with HIV/AIDS, homosexuality and the Chilean dictatorship
- Style: Performance art, activist art
- Website: www.yeguasdelapocalipsis.cl

Las Yeguas del Apocalipsis ('The Mares of the Apocalypse') were a Chilean artistic duo comprising Pedro Lemebel and Francisco Casas Silva. They were active from 1987 to 1993 and were noted for their performance art to generate visibility about sexual diversity, HIV/AIDS and human rights. Their work has been noted as being a pioneer at the intersection of art, activism and politics.

== History ==
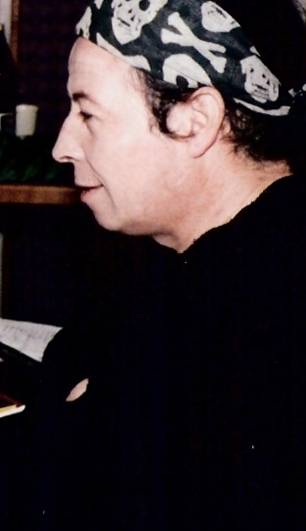
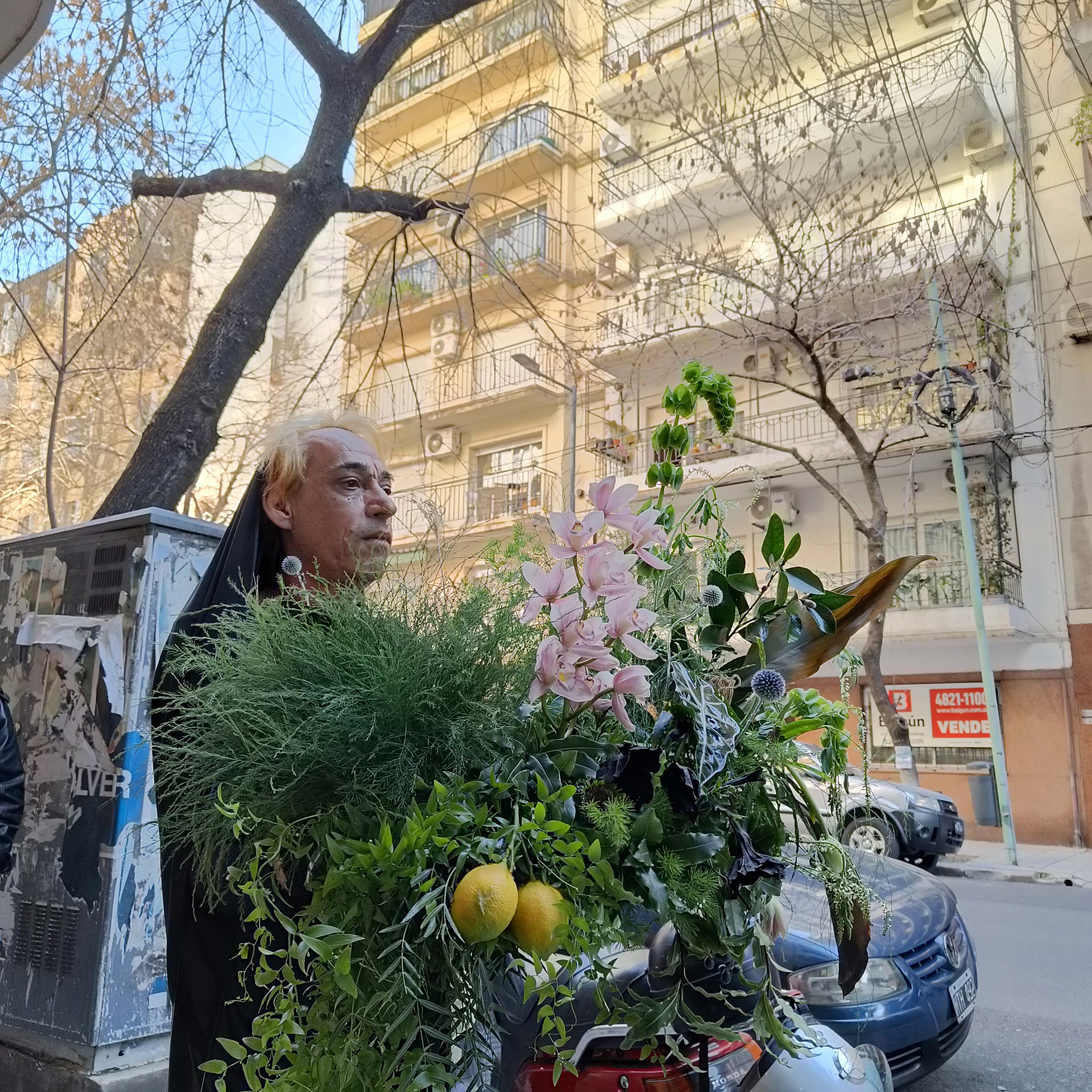
Lemebel (left) in 2011 and Casas (right) in 2023

The name of the artistic duo has been considered a reference to HIV/AIDS, personifying the Horsemen of the Apocalypse in feminine form. In a 1989 interview, the duo associated yegua with the Yagua and Yahgan people. Lemebel in a 1995 interview explained that in Chilean Spanish, yegua is used as an insult towards women and that when the Yeguas used it they "stripped it of its misogyny".

The first intervention as a duo was in 1987, where they distributed pamphlets about AIDS in the Chilean Book Fair while dressed in the garb typical of the Center of Mothers (Spanish: Centro de Madres, CEMA Chile), at the time led by Lucía Hiriart, the wife of Augusto Pinochet.

Their first intervention registered by news media was in October 1988, when Raúl Zurita was receiving the Pablo Neruda Award, where they offered a crown of thorns to Zurita, who did not put it on. It was also the first time they identified themselves as Las Yeguas del Apocalipsis.

The Yeguas interrupted various political spaces following the 1988 plebiscite and the awaited return to democracy. In one meeting between artists and then presidential candidate Patricio Aylwin, the Yeguas came uninvited, with a canvas reading "homosexuals for change". During the intervention, one of them grabbed then candidate for the Senate and future President Ricardo Lagos and kissed him on the mouth, though accounts on if Lemebel or Casas kissed him vary. (Note: First two sources cited, being retrospectives from 2026 and 2018 respectively, report that Casas kissed Lagos, as does Memoria Chilena. Meanwhile, Casas claimed in a 2016 interview that Lemebel was the one to kiss Lagos.)

For Day of the Race 1989, the Yeguas performed at the headquarters for the Chilean Human Rights Commission with an intervention titled "the Conquest of America", where they danced cueca barefoot over a map of Latin America covered with broken Coca-Cola bottles. The dancing of cueca was cited by the Yeguas to be inspired by cueca sola, a solo variant of the dance created as a form of protest over the forced disappearances during the dictatorship. This performance fused the wounds of the Spanish colonization of the Americas with the new wounds from the Chilean military dictatorship, with the Coca-Cola bottles as a symbol of the American imperialism involved in its installation. That same year they were part of an art installation by the French Chilean Institute; with the performance titled "what AIDS took", they dressed in clothes of their travesti friends, many of them having been affected by the HIV epidemic and posed as various Hollywood actresses.

After the return to democracy, the Chilean National Museum of Fine Arts installed an exhibition called Open Museum, with a focus on a lack of censorship and artistic freedom. However, the short film made by the Yeguas, Casa Particular, was censored during the event due to a scene where a travesti's penis was visible. As a response, the Yeguas posed hugging in the facade of the museum, standing in the center of a star made out of neoprene and set on fire.

Lemebel and Casas' work as a duo stopped around 1993, as they both focused on their respective literary careers. However, their last time working together was in 1997 for the sixth biennale in Havana, Cuba, with a retrospective of their work as Las Yeguas del Apocalipsis.

== Legacy and recognition ==
The Yeguas have been referred to as "indisputed precursors" to current LGBT movements.

From 20 January to 19 April 2026, the first retrospective exhibition of the Yeguas' work was shown in the Chilean National Museum of Fine Arts, curated by Gerardo Mosquera, with the museum notice noting the Yeguas' "pioneering importance" at the "intersection of art, activism and politics."

Photos of the Yeguas' work are included in the archives of museums such as the Museo Nacional Centro de Arte Reina Sofía in Spain, the Museum of Modern Art in New York, and the Latin American Art Museum of Buenos Aires.
