= Roberto Condori =

Bolivian LGBT activist and journalist

- Citizenship: Bolivian
- Occupations: LGBT activist and journalist
- Organization: Maricas Movement Bolivia

Roberto Condori Carita is an LGBT activist and Bolivian journalist. They are part of Maricas Movement Bolivia and one of the creators of the LGBT radio program Marica Nation, for which they won the first Journalist without Risk award in 2018. They are a member of the Aymara nation.

== Biography ==
They were born outside of La Paz to a low-income family who originally migrated there to work as day laborers. They completed higher studies in social communication.

They started their activism in 2010 alongside their partner, the poet Edgar Soliz, as a host of the radio program I'm Queer, so What?, that was broadcast by Radio Deseao, the radio station of the feminist movement Mujeres Creando. Later, both continued the idea of doing activism via the radio, and for this reason in 2013 they created Marica Nation, a radio program that discussed LGBT topics from a decolonial perspective that was first broadcast by Radio Fejuve. In 2017, the program was picked up by Radio Líder as a weekly program that was broadcast as far as El Alto. The name of the program was taken from the title of a book by Chilean author Juan Pablo Sutherland, which they had authorization to use.

Thanks to Marica Nation's report "Does everyone have abortions? Do lesbians have abortions?," Condori and Soliz won the first Journalist without Risk award in 2018, given by the Alliance for Solidarity as part of the Journalism Reports Contest of sexual and reproductive rights. According to the judges, the award-winning report "is especially interesting via the lens of sexual and reproductive rights, given it works on guaranteeing LGBTQI+ people rights and helps understand the reality of the criminalization of abortion in Bolivia." Condori and Soliz won the same award the next year with their program "Dying for being a Trans Woman in Bolivia: Dayana Kenia, a history so far from justice."

In 2023, they worked alongside Soliz in Chile on Disobedient Fashion show, where they wore traditional indigenous women's clothing and did a performance art piece with an "Indian-indigenous-chola, dissident, decolonial, anti-racist, and politically incorrect" lens.

== Bibliography ==
As part of Maricas Movement Bolivia, they have collaborated on the following books:

- Diccionario Marica (2014)
- Gay discreto busca heterocurioso (2018)
