= Pohlhammer =

Pohlhammer is a surname. Notable people with the surname include:

- Erick Pohlhammer (1955–2023), Chilean poet
- Serjio Livingstone Pohlhammer (1920–2012), Chilean footballer and journalist
