= Isabel Gómez =

Isabel Gómez may refer to:

- Isabel Gómez Muñoz, Chilean poet
- Isabel Gómez Pérez, Spanish rhythmic gymnast
- Isabel Gomez (soccer), Australian soccer player

== See also ==
- Isabel Gómez-Bassols, psychologist, writer, and broadcaster
