= My Tender Matador =

2001 novel by Pedro Lemebel

- Spanish-language edition cover
- Author: Pedro Lemebel
- Original title: Tengo miedo, torero
- Translator: Katherine Silver
- Cover artist: Paz Errázuriz
- Language: Spanish
- Genre: Novel
- Set in: Santiago, Chile
- Publisher: Seix Barral (Planeta)
- Publication date: 2001

My Tender Matador (Spanish: Tengo miedo, torero, lit. 'I am afraid, bullfighter') is a 2001 novel by Chilean writer Pedro Lemebel.

Set in Santiago during the second half of 1986, the novel is a love story between a poor travesti and a leftist Manuel Rodríguez Patriotic Front guerrilla who participates in the attempted assassination of military dictator Augusto Pinochet. Among the characters in the novel are Pinochet himself, his wife Lucía Hiriart and Gonzalo Cáceres, then Hiriart's stylist and later a show business personality.

My Tender Matador is the fourth book and only novel by Lemebel. It was published in Chile in 2001 by Seix Barral's "Biblioteca breve" collection. That same year it was also published in Spain in Anagrama's "Narrativas hispánicas" collection.

== Creation of the novel ==
The novel's title, Tengo miedo, torero, is the verse of a song by the Spanish singer Sara Montiel (1928–2013). Moreover, within the novel, it is the watchword that the protagonists use to identify themselves. A second title that Lemebel contemplated for the novel is La loca del frente. As Lemebel indicates on a page at the beginning of the book, the novel emerged from twenty pages written by the author in the late 1980s. A series of acknowledgements on that page, including one "to the house" itself, hints at an autobiographical nature in the story's content.

The work was written with the support of the Fondo Nacional de Desarrollo Cultural y las Artes, a competitive fund administered by the National Council of Culture and the Arts, and also thanks to a Guggenheim Fellowship, granted by the John Simon Guggenheim Memorial Foundation.

== Structure ==
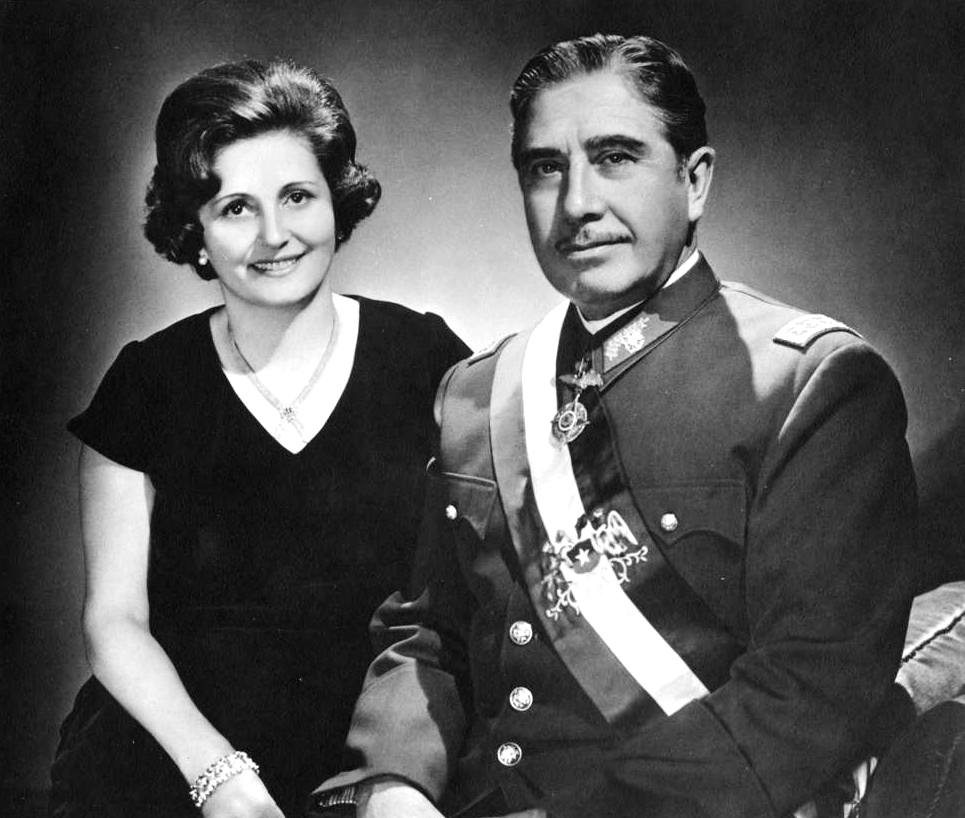
Lucía Hiriart and Augusto Pinochet around 1974. Both are important and frequent characters in the novel.

Written in the third person, the novel revolves around a main character about whom the narrator describes both what she thinks and feels. Dialogues are written in the middle of paragraphs, without cutting the flow of the text. The book is divided into untitled sections, and at one point some sections dedicated exclusively to Augusto Pinochet and his relationship with his wife, Lucía Hiriart, begin to be interspersed. Both stories, that of the protagonist and her beloved, and that of Pinochet and his wife, run in parallel, interspersed towards the end of the book more frequently, even several times in the same section. Where this parallelism is most accentuated is when the day of the assassination attempt on Pinochet is recounted, through a chronological description of the events, explaining the exact time at which they occur.

== Plot ==
The story begins in the spring of 1986, in a poor neighborhood of Santiago inhabited by many leftists. In the midst of the dictatorship, the capital is full of frequent protests, marches and a certain sense of hope to remove Augusto Pinochet from power. It is in this context that the "Queen of the Corner", an effeminate travesti in her forties, who rents a dilapidated house to live in, arrives in the neighborhood. Carlos, a handsome and virile young man, helps her to arrange her meager belongings, beginning to frequent the house and also inviting other university friends during the nights with the excuse of being a quiet place to study. Secret meetings, held during curfew, begin to become more and more frequent, and in those in which Carlos can not participate, he stays talking with an increasingly enamored landlady, who despite the requests of her few gay friends, has not wanted to introduce the young man.

During these conversations, the Queen of the Corner brings up her past links to prostitution, a broken family, being motherless and being the child of an abusive father, who once raped her as a child while he was drunk. She left home at the age of 18, when he wanted to force her to do her military service.

Flag of the Manuel Rodríguez Patriotic Front

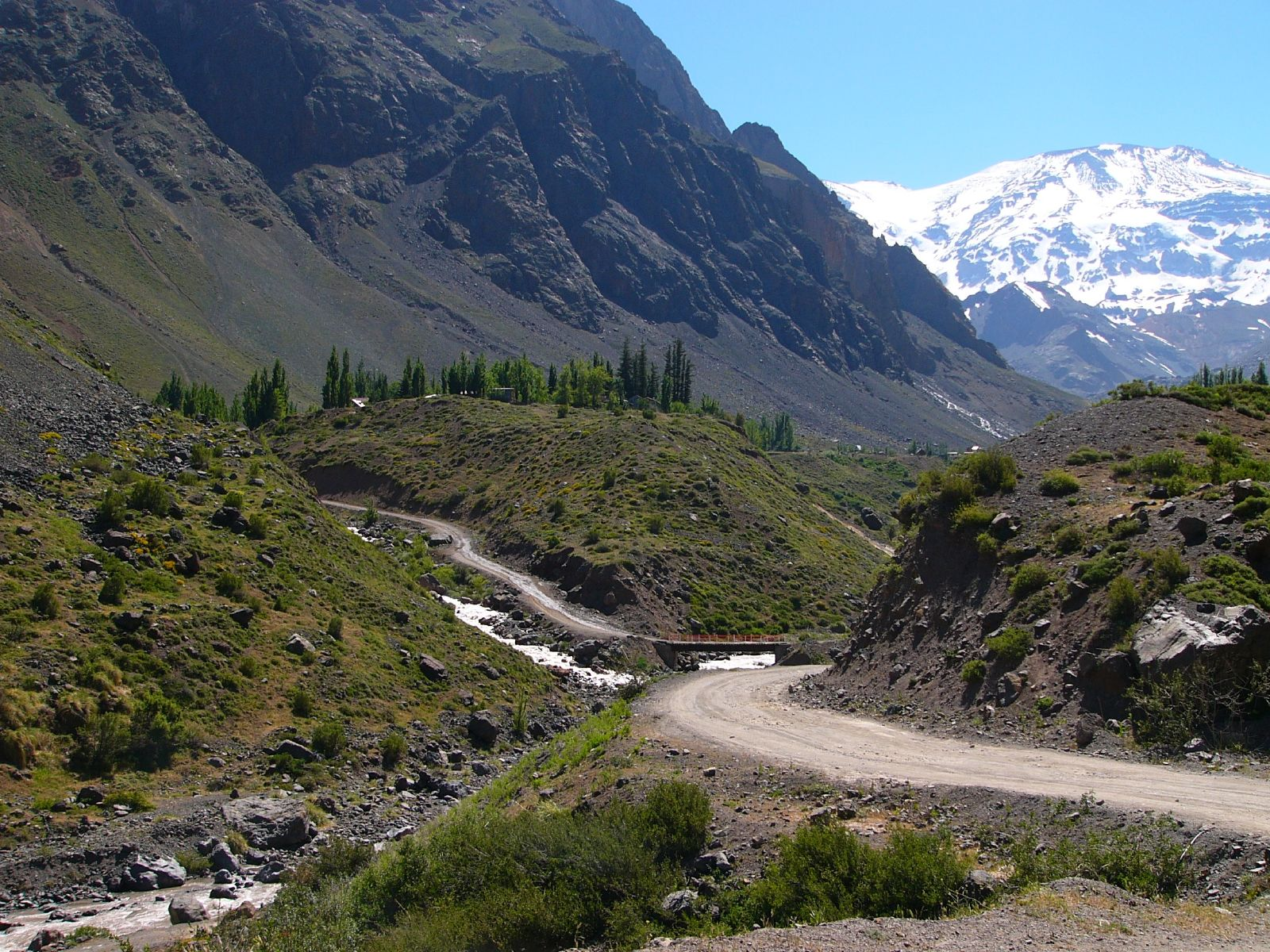
View of the Cajón del Maipo, where an important part of the story takes place

September arrives and, as usual, the protests on the anniversary of the coup d'état of 11 September 1973 increase. One day Carlos leaves a suspicious metal pipe at the Queen's house, and then invites her for a walk to Cajón del Maipo, where Augusto Pinochet and his wife, Lucía Hiriart, usually go to rest, accompanied by a strict military contingent. Once there, while Carlos takes photographs and measurements of the terrain, supposedly for university work, the dictator's armored vehicle passes very close to them.

Later, as Carlos drops the Queen off at her house, they hear in the car a radio report about a raid on weapons of the Manuel Rodríguez Patriotic Front, a revolutionary and armed extreme left-wing group opposed to Pinochet. Carlos then leaves abruptly, without saying goodbye. Despite this, the Queen is not angry for too long, as Carlos promptly returns to apologize. At the same time, Pinochet, ignoring his wife's constant complaints, realizes that the couple they saw on the way to Cajón del Maipo were homosexuals. Furious, he decides to contact the mayor to set up surveillance at the site.

The next morning, the Queen, who earns her living embroidering tablecloths, goes to leave an order in the upper district, to the home of Señora Catita, the wealthy wife of General Ortúzar, who is organizing a large military dinner for the celebration of September 11. On the way there, the Queen defends some students from the insults of an old follower of Pinochet. The Queen arrives at the luxurious mansion, but once in front of the dining room, she leave the place without delivering the order, knowing that she is losing her best client. | Lucía Hiriart continues to reproach her husband, this time for her lack of style and her poor life with him, without the luxuries and public acceptance she would like. Pinochet, listening to her in silence and remembering the simple seventeen-year-old girl with whom he fell in love, falls asleep suffering from another of his recurring nightmares. }} Later, the Queen goes to visit her friends Lupe, Fabiola and Rana, three homosexuals, also of limited means. The oldest, Rana, was formerly a worker in a refined brothel in the north of the country. Many years ago, Rana rescued the Queen from alcoholism and misery, teaching her how to sew and giving her room and board. After the Queen surpassed her in the embroidery technique, beginning to take clients away from her, Rana threw her out of the house, and they reconciled sometime later.

The Queen throws Carlos a birthday party, inviting all the children on her street. After all the children leave, Carlo tells the Queen a secret from his childhood, when he discovered masturbation with his best childhood friend. Already drunk, Carlos falls asleep, and the Queen performs fellatio on him, which he later fails to acknowledge was real, opening the possibility that he had only imagined it.

On the same day, Augusto Pinochet wishes to sleep a little longer, avoiding hearing his wife's incessant chatter. However, he dreams of his traumatic tenth birthday, when his mother forced him to invite all his schoolmates, whom he considered his enemies. Pinochet, in order to spite his classmates, had hidden spiders and cockroaches in the cake. But in the end no guests arrived, and so his mother made him eat the cake alone. }} The next day, Carlos takes the last packages away, leaving the house almost empty, and before leaving he confesses to the Queen what she already assumed: the packages were not university books, but rather weapons; he belongs to the Manuel Rodríguez Patriotic Front, and she is now inadvertently involved with the front. He also tells her that he loves her very much, and that he is happy when he is with her. Then they go together by car to return a record player to Recoleta, and they are welcomed by Rana with an eleven o'clock party. After a joyful afternoon, Carlos says goodbye, perhaps forever, but the Queen angrily drives him away, remaining alone and worried in her dismantled house.

After receiving a call from the warehouse on behalf of Doña Catita, the Queen asks that Doña Catita be told that she no longer lives in the neighborhood, and sensing a bad omen, she decides to spend the rest of the afternoon downtown. On the Alameda she finds protest flyers on the ground; as she bends down to pick one up, a carabinero hits her. At the cathedral she joins a protest by the women of relatives of disappeared detainees, which is repelled with tear gas, having to flee into a gallery, where she is guided by a taxi boy to the Cine Capri, a depressing gay porn cinema. Despite his attempts to offer her his services, the Queen is too worried, so she finally leaves the cinema, finding the city in shock, as the attack has already taken place, learning that all the members of the Front have been saved, that seven soldiers have been killed and that Pinochet is unharmed.

Pinochet leaves early with his entourage to Cajón del Maipo, leaving his wife at home with a headache, much to his delight. Due to unexpected road arrangements, they have to go through Pirque instead of Achupallas, the route initially planned. Once in his mansion, he tries to rest, but different things make him furious: his secretary's request to review an official speech, an effeminate cadet wandering around his mansion, and a Spanish newspaper where he is treated as a criminal.Late in the afternoon, they set out on their return to Santiago, asking their retinue to slow down, despite security regulations, to delay their arrival. Suddenly the shooting starts. Pinochet survives again. }}

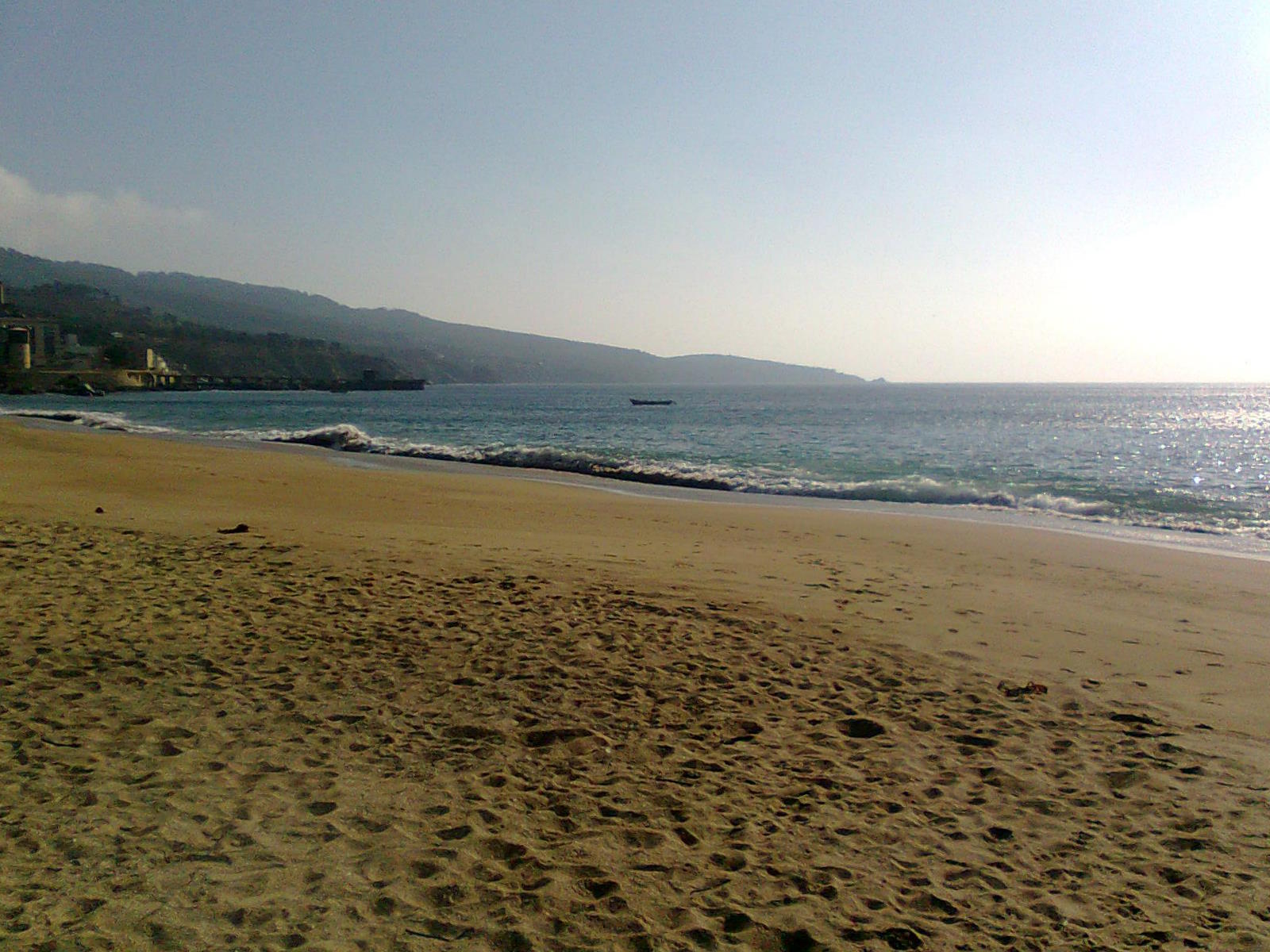
Beach of Laguna Verde Bay, in Valparaíso, where the protagonists bid farewell

In the midst of a shocked Santiago, while Lucía Hiriart gives a press conference and Pinochet continues with fear and nightmares, Laura, another Front comrade, takes the Queen to a bar in Viña del Mar to meet Carlos, who takes her by cab to Laguna Verde in Valparaíso, where they celebrate. He thanks her for her help to the Front and gives her money so that she can live in hiding for a few months; in contrast, Pinochet and his wife, an angry and loveless married couple, hide out in Viña del Mar's Cerro Castillo, with more discreet security. Carlos tells the Queen that he is leaving early tomorrow morning for Cuba, and in a fit of passion, asks her to come with him. The Queen refuses, but asks him to tell her three words: "Tengo miedo torero".

== Connections with reality ==
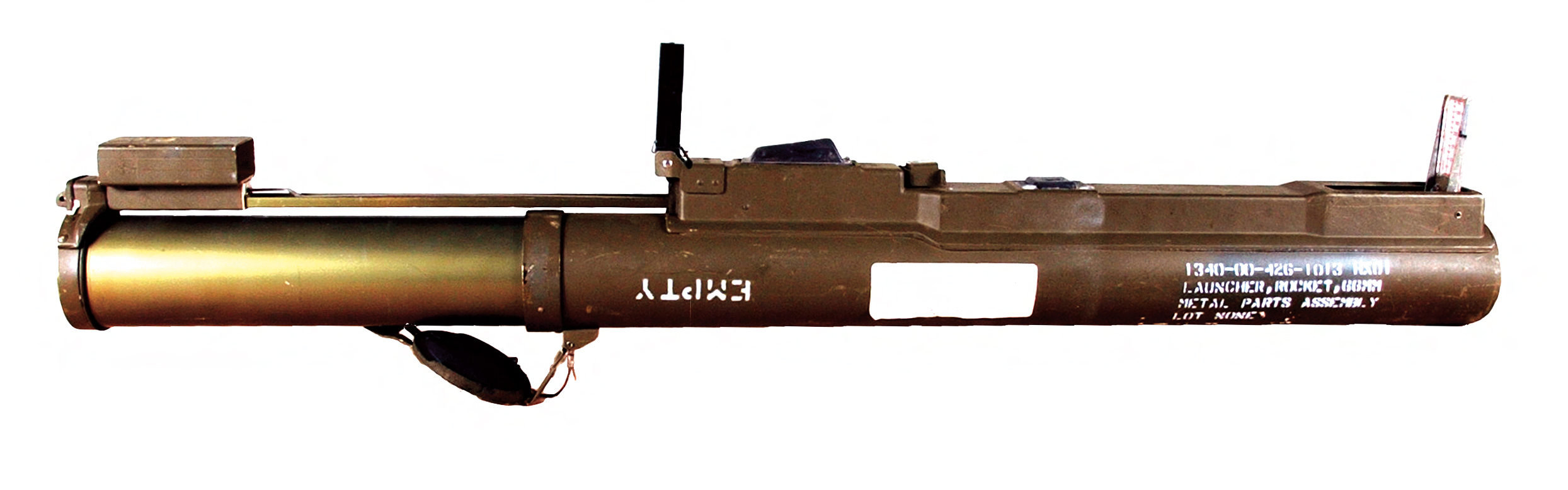
An M72 LAW rocket launcher, used by the "frentistas" during the attack

The novel revolves around several real events in Chile in 1986. The Manuel Rodríguez Patriotic Front did indeed exist, claiming responsibility for the extensive power outage that affected half the country on 1 May of that year, in commemoration of International Workers' Day. Later, on 7 September, its members carried out an attack against Pinochet on the road to Cajón del Maipo, from which he managed to escape unharmed.

Also real are the constant protests, the violence of the Carabineros de Chile to repel the demonstrators, and the announcements of Radio Cooperativa, which played an important role in opposing the military dictatorship, denouncing its human rights violations as much as possible.

== Reception and critics ==
For the launch of the novel, Lemebel, known for his performances and travesti appearances, wore a deep red dress and a feathered headdress, in a ceremony with a large audience of followers, politicians, filmmakers, journalists, and writers. The work was among the best-selling books in Chile for more than a year and had international recognition, being translated into English, French, Italian, and German.

Tengo miedo, torero received positive reviews in the national press. Willy Haltenhoff wrote for the newspaper La Nación that its writing was the "most original and portentous, due to its baroque nature, of the Chilean literary environment, an imagery of exceptional linguistic richness", associating it with Manuel Puig's Kiss of the Spider Woman, and with the films Strawberry and Chocolate and Before Night Falls. José Promis, for El Mercurio, highlighted the "carefree, irreverent, sarcastic and, above all, intentionally provocative style that the author has always exhibited", saying that reading this work "startles, disconcerts, but entertains and has a gratifying flavor". Camilo Marks, for the magazine Qué Pasa, highlighted the work's theme as unique, considering it "in part the most outstanding work of his talent".

In 2002, Tengo miedo, torero was nominated in the third edition of the Altazor Prize of National Arts, in the category of "Narrative", but lost to Cuentos completos by José Miguel Varas.

== Adaptations ==
Lemebel, together with the Chilean Business theater company, founded by Rodrigo Muñoz, Claudia Pérez and Mario Soto, adapted the novel into a play, which premiered in 2006. The same company had previously adapted his book of chronicles, De perlas y cicatrices (2000), and a few years later premiered Cristal en tu corazón (2009). The play Tengo miedo torero, as well as its actor Rodrigo Muñoz, were nominated in 2006 in the VII edition of the Altazor Award of the National Arts.

The 2020 feature film My Tender Matador was based on the novel. It was directed by Rodrigo Sepúlveda and starred Alfredo Castro.

== See also ==
- Attempted assassination of Augusto Pinochet
- Manuel Rodríguez Patriotic Front
- LGBT history in Chile

== Bibliography ==
- Lemebel, Pedro (2001). Tengo miedo, torero (1st ed.). Barcelona: Anagrama. ISBN 84-339-2487-7.
