= Malú Urriola =

Chilean poet and screenwriter (1967–2023)

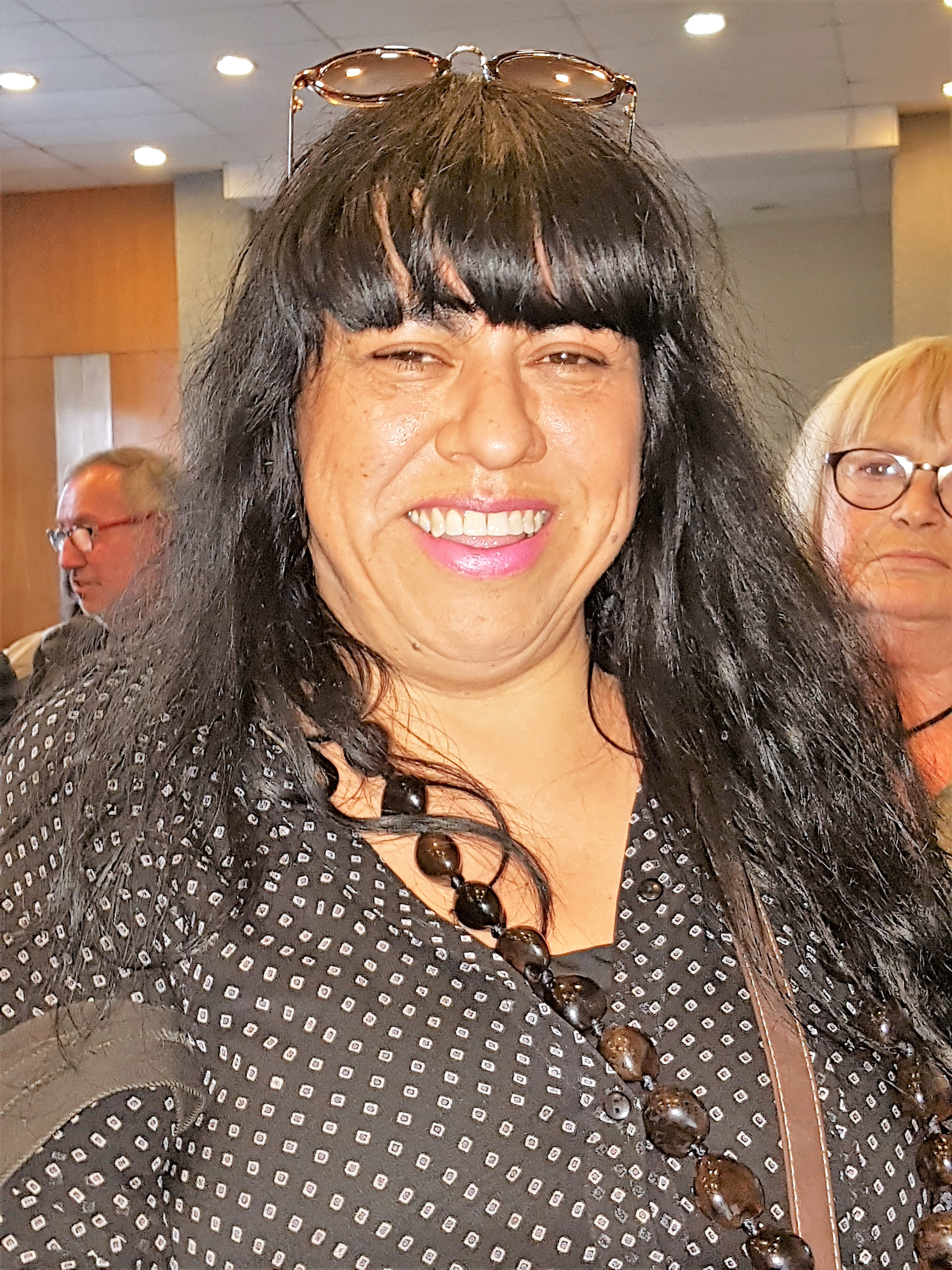
- Urriola in 2017
- Born: Marilú Urriola; 9 June 1967; Santiago, Chile
- Died: 21 July 2023 (aged 56)
- Writing career
- Language: Spanish
- Genre: Poetry
- Notable awards: Pablo Neruda Award (2006)

María de la Luz Urriola González (9 June 1967 – 21 July 2023), most often known as Malú Urriola, was a Chilean poet, screenwriter and academic. She wrote seven books of poetry and won the 2006 Pablo Neruda Award. She was a professor at the Catholic University of Chile. As a screenwriter, Urriola wrote for the television programs Los Venegas and La vida es una lotería.

== Early life and academia ==
Malú Urriola was born in Santiago on 9 June 1967. She began writing at the age of 14 and received a scholarship from the poetry workshop of the Pablo Neruda Foundation in 1986.

Urriola earned a master's degree in scriptwriting in Madrid, Spain. She was a professor in the Faculty of Letters at the Catholic University of Chile.

== Writing career ==
Urriola published her first book, Piedras rodantes, in 1988 when she was 21. In 1994, she received a grant from the Fund for the Development of Arts and Culture (FONDART) to publish her book Dame tu sucio amor.

Urriola received another FONDART grant in 2002 for her project with Nadia Prado, Poesía es +: Lectura de poesía desde globos aerostáticos. The project was an urban intervention that included a plane that flew over the Parque Forestal in Santiago with a banner reading "Y si la jaula estuviera siempre abierta" ("And if the cage were always open"), a balloon that flew over the port of San Antonio with the phrase "Los ojos son libres" ("The eyes are free") and a banner at the National Stadium with the word "Memoria" ("Memory").

Urriola wrote scripts for feature films, series and soap operas. She was a writer for the television programs Los Venegas and La vida es una lotería. In 2004, she received the Best Television Contribution Award from the Servicio Nacional de la Mujer for her 2003 script for "Sofía (Una historia de maltrato a la Mujer)", from the Televisión Nacional de Chile series Cuentos de Mujeres. She also wrote for The Sentimental Teaser (1999), Los simuladores (2005–2006) and Lola (2007–2008). Her works for theater include El último beso (2001) and La noche del accidente (2011).

Urriola's works have been included in a number of poetry anthologies, including 16 poetas chilenos, Antología de la poesía latinoamericana del siglo XXI, Antología de poetas chilenas. Confiscación y silencio, and Mujeres poetas de Chile: muestra Antológica 1980–1995.

Urriola died on July 21, 2023, at age 56.

== Awards ==
Urriola won the Pablo Neruda Award in 2006. Her writing also earned her the Santiago Municipal Literature Award and an award from the Consejo Nacional del Libro y la Lectura for her collection Nada in 2004. In 2019, she received the Premio a la Trayectoria Poética Pablo Neruda.

== Works ==
- Piedras rodantes (1988)
- Dame tu sucio amor (1994)
- Hija de perro (1998)
- Nada (2003)
- Bracea (2007)
- Cadáver exquisito (2017)
- El cuaderno de las cosas inútiles (2022)
- La luz que me ciega with photographer Paz Errázuriz (2010)
- La noche en el espejo (2016)
