= Francisco Casas Silva =

Chilean writer and LGBT activist

Francisco Casas
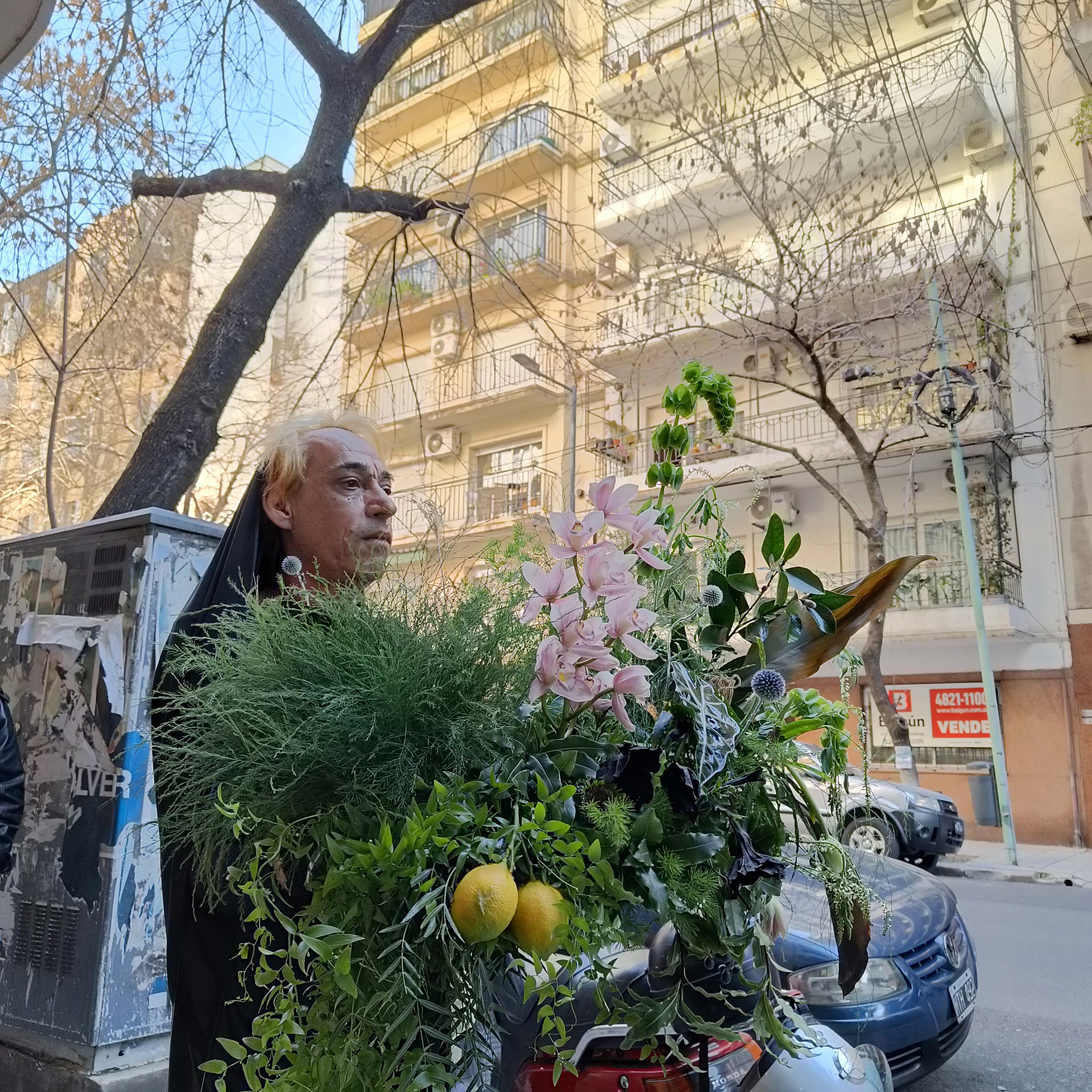
- Casas in 2023
- Born: Francisco Elías Casas Silva; January 19, 1959 (age 67); Santiago de Chile, Chile
- Occupations: Visual artist Writer

Francisco Elías Casas Silva (born 19 January 1959) is a Chilean visual artist and writer. Together with Pedro Lemebel he was part of the duo Las Yeguas del Apocalipsis.

== Biography ==
Francisco Elías Casas Silva was born on 19 January 1959 to Elías Domingo Casas Cifuentes and Inés Rebeca Silva Lepe. In 1987, when he was a student of literature, he formed the artistic duo Las Yeguas del Apocalipsis ("The Mares of the Apocalypse") with the writer Pedro Lemebel.

The first purported appearance of the duo was during the Santiago International Book Fair, where they dressed as volunteers of CEMA Chile, distributing pamphlets about AIDS. Their first appearance on record happened on 22 October 1988, during the awarding of the Pablo Neruda Prize to poet Raúl Zurita in La Chascona. Lemebel and Casas appeared during the ceremony and offered a crown of thorns to Zurita, which was not accepted by him.

On 21 August 1989, the duo performed a piece titled De qué se ríe, presidente ("What he laughed at, President") at Teatro Cariola (Cariola Theater) during a meeting of intellectuals with presidential candidate Patricio Aylwin. The following year, Aylwin would become the first democratically elected President of Chile after the end of the military dictatorship. On that occasion, despite not having being invited, the duo took the stage wearing heels and feathers, and raised a banner that read Homosexuales por el cambio ("Homosexuals for change"). As they left the stage, Casas rushed toward then-senator and future president of Chile, Ricardo Lagos, kissing him on the mouth.

In 1991, Casas published his first literary work, Sodoma mía ("My sodom"), consisting of a poem in which he expresses his vision of reality contrasted with social issues such as AIDS.

The visual artworks that Casas has developed have been included in collections such as the Santiago Museum of Contemporary Art, the Museo Reina Sofía in Madrid, and the Lima Art Museum. Some of the exhibitions he has presented include Ese'eja in 2016, La Dama de Cao junto a Silvana Pestana ("The lady of Cao with Silvana Pestana") in 2017, Las metáforas quebradas de Yakuruna y otras Amazonias junto a Julio Urbina ("The broken metaphors of Yakuruna and other Amazonias with Julio Urbina") in 2020, and Malena canta el tango ("Malena sings tango") in 2023.

In 2009, Casas publicly supported the presidential candidacy of Marco Enriquez-Ominami, founder of the Chilean Progressive Party. In 2013, he settled in the Barranco District of Lima. In September 2022, he began a journey through Peru, Bolivia, Argentina, and Chile with Joanna Reposi, director of the documentary Lemebel, to film a movie.

== Literary works ==
- Sodoma mía (1991)
- Yo, yegua (2004)
- Romance de la inmaculada llanura (2008)
- Romance del arcano sin nombre (2009)
- Partitura (2015)
