= Gonzalo Millán =

Chilean writer and poet

- Born: January 1, 1947; Santiago, Chile
- Died: October 14, 2006 (aged 59); Santiago, Chile
- Education: University of Concepción
- Occupations: Writer and poet
- Writing career
- Language: Spanish
- Genre: Poetry
- Notable awards: Pablo Neruda Award (1987)

Gonzalo Millán (1 January 1947 – 14 October 2006) was a Chilean writer and poet.

Millán lived in exile in Canada and the Netherlands between 1973 and 1997. His most famous work, La ciudad (The City), was first published in Montreal in 1979 by Les Editions Maison Culturelle Québec-Amérique Latine, set up to publish Latin American writing in Canada.

He was awarded the Pablo Neruda Foundation poetry prize in 1986.

== Works ==
- Relación personal (Personal relationship) (1968)
- La ciudad (The City) (1979, 1994, 2007)
- Vida (Life) (1984)
- Seudónimos de la muerte (Pseudonyms of death) (1984)
- Virus (1987)
- Dragón que se muerde la cola (Dragon biting its tail) (1987)
- 5 poemas eróticos (5 erotic poems) (1990)
- Strange houses (1991)
- Trece lunas (Thirteen moons) (1997)
- Claroscuro (Chiaroscuro) (2002)
- Autorretrato de memoria (Self-portrait from memory) (2005)
- Veneno de escorpión azul. Diario de vida y de muerte (Blue scorpion venom. Diary of life and death) (2007)
- Gabinete de papel (Paper cabinet) (2008)

== Awards ==
- 1968: Pedro de Oña Award for Relación personal
- 1987: Pablo Neruda Award
- 2006: Altazor Award in poetry for Autorretrato de memoria
