= Gloria Dünkler =

Chilean writer (born 1977)

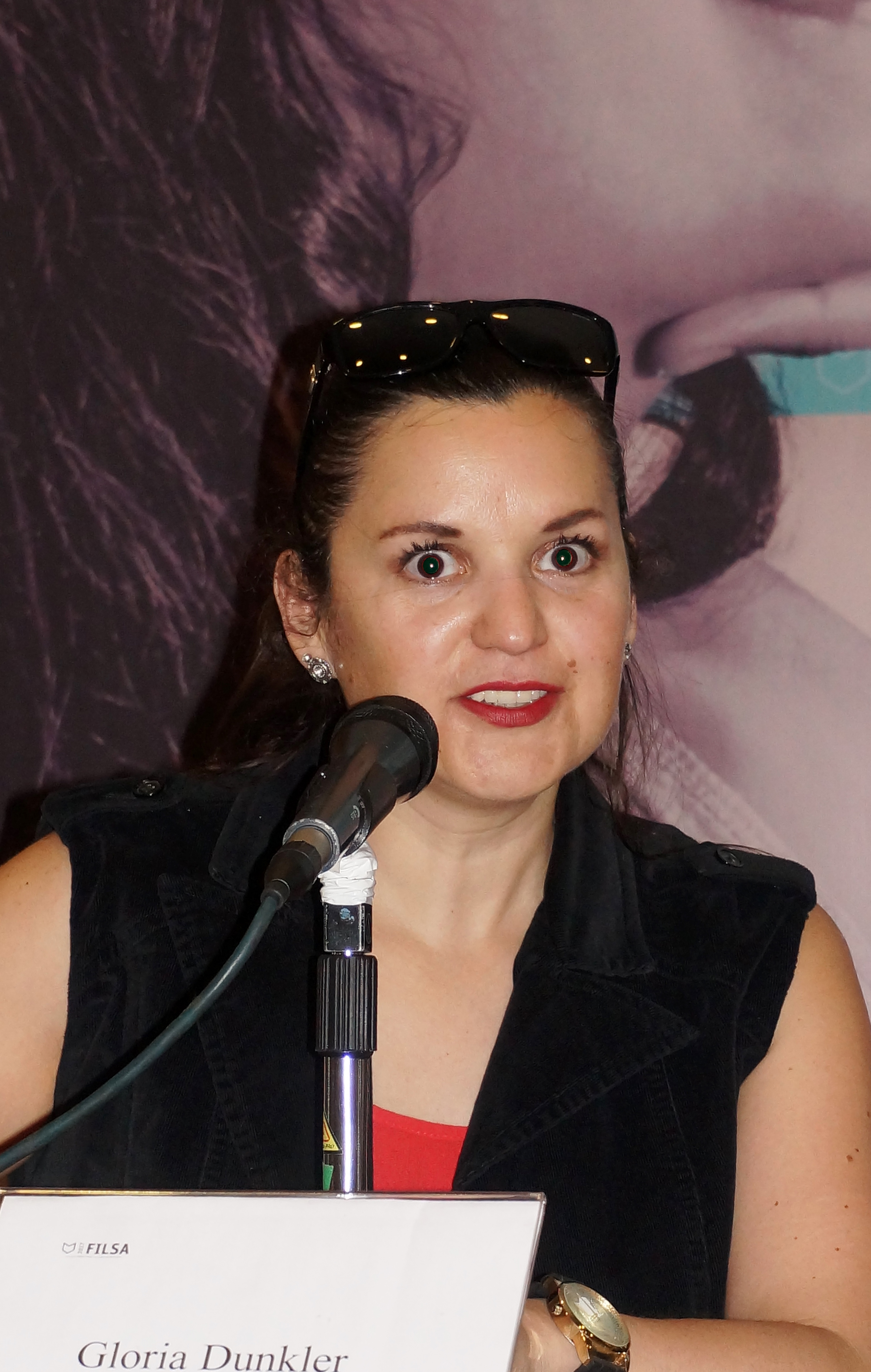
- At FILSA 2017
- Born: Gloria Dünkler Valencia; 1977 (age 48–49); Pucón, Chile
- Education: Metropolitan University of Technology
- Occupations: Writer, librarian
- Notable work: Spandau
- Awards: Santiago Municipal Literature Award (2013); Pablo Neruda Award (2016)

Gloria Dünkler (born 1977) is a Chilean writer, and winner of the 2016 Pablo Neruda Award. She is best known for her poetry, although she also collects folktales.

== Biography ==
Gloria Dünkler was born into a large family of artisans, musicians, and fishermen. She studied Pedagogy in Language and Communication at the University of La Frontera in Temuco, and graduated as a Spanish teacher and a licentiate in education in 2003. Later, in 2009, she qualified as a librarian at the Metropolitan University of Technology in Santiago.

The same year of her graduation as a teacher, she self-published her first book of poems, Quilaco seducido. With the second, Füchse von Llafenko (Spanish: Zorros de Llafenko), which was released by Ediciones Tácitas in 2009, she won her first major award, the Academy, given by the Academia Chilena de la Lengua. The following collection of poems, Spandau (2012), consolidated her outstanding position in new poetry of her country by receiving the Santiago Municipal Literature Award. In 2015 Dünkler released her fourth poetry collection, Yatagán, and the following year her poetic career was distinguished with the Pablo Neruda Award.

Her poems, reviews, and conversations appear in the Daf-Brücke journals of the Association of German Professors (AGPA), Chile affiliate (Santiago, 2010), and in Nachrichten (Frankfurt, 2009). Texts of hers, along with those of other national poets, Polish and German, were part of the Poetry Bombings in Warsaw in 2009 and in Berlin in 2010, organized by the collective Casagrande. Her poems have appeared in several anthologies, both in Chile (Mujeres en la poesía chilena actual, Semejanza, 2000) and in other countries (Argentina – Desde todo el silencio, Los Puños de la Paloma, and Comer con la mirada, Desde la Gente, both in 2008 – and Mexico, Doce en punto, UNAM, 2012), and have been translated into German, Polish, and Catalan. She has participated in festivals representing Chile, such as the Larinale 2013 (Berlin) and the Festival of La Mar de Músicas 2015, in Cartagena, Spain.

The theme of Dünkler's work deals mainly with the settlement of the first German colonists in Mapuche territory and the contrasts between both cultures and identities. She has participated in numerous literary contests and obtained important recognitions. Dünkler also collects folktales and has been a fellow of the workshop of writer Pía Barros.

She resides in Santiago, where she works as a librarian at the Faculty of Sciences of the University of Chile. On Mondays, Wednesdays, and Fridays, after her working day, she goes to boxing training at the Team Pardo gym. The poet, who claims not to drink or smoke, began to practice this sport for self-defense.

== Works ==
- Quilaco seducido, self-published, Pucón, 2003
- Füchse von Llafenko (Zorros de Llafenko), Ediciones Tácitas, Santiago, 2009
- Spandau, Tácitas, 2012
- Yatagán, Tácitas, 2015

== Awards and recognitions ==
- First regional place in the 12th Contest of Stories and Tales of the Rural World (FUCOA), 2003
- Third place in the 3rd Rural World Poetry Contest, organized by the Agricultural Communication Foundation, Ministry of Agriculture (FUCOA), 2004
- First regional prize in the 13th Rural World Stories and Tales Contest (FUCOA), 2005
- First prize in the 2007 essay contest of the CFT-UTEM (Metropolitan University of Technology)
- 2008 Los Puños de la Paloma Award (Santa Fe, Argentina)
- 2010 Academy Award for Füchse von Llafenko (Academia Chilena de la Lengua)
- Honorable Mention for the 2010 Santiago Municipal Literature Award for Füchse von Llafenko
- Fellowship of the National Book and Reading Council, 2011
- 2013 Critics' Award for Spandau
- 2013 Santiago Municipal Literature Award for Spandau
- Fellowship of the National Book and Reading Council, 2013
- 2016 Pablo Neruda Award
