= My Tender Matador (film) =

2020 film

- film poster
- Spanish: Tengo miedo torero
- Directed by: Rodrigo Sepúlveda
- Written by: Pedro Lemebel
- Starring: Alfredo Castro; Leonardo Ortizgris; Amparo Noguera
- Cinematography: Sergio Armstrong
- Music by: Pedro Aznar; Manuel García
- Production companies: Forastero, Zapik Films
- Release date: September 3, 2020 (Venice)
- Running time: 93 minutes
- Countries: Chile; Argentina; Mexico
- Language: Spanish

My Tender Matador (Spanish: Tengo miedo torero) is a 2020 historical romantic drama film directed by Rodrigo Sepúlveda with a screenplay written by the same Sepúlveda, alongside Juan Elias Tovar. It is based on Pedro Lemebel's 2001 novel of the same name. It is a co-production between Chile, Argentina and Mexico.

== Plot ==
Chile, 1986, a few days before Augusto Pinochet's attempted assassination.

It's the love story between "the Queen of the Corner" (Castro), a middle-aged travesti who embroiders tablecloths for military wives, and young Carlos (Ortizgris), a guerrilla member of the Manuel Rodríguez Patriotic Front.

"the Queen of the Corner" meets Carlos after the police raid a queer nightclub both were attending. A woman was shot and killed in the raid. Carlos protects the Queen from the police. She gives him her number and tells him to call the next day.

The Queen and her friends have a gathering to celebrate the life of the woman who was murdered in the nightclub raid.

Carlos visits the Queen and asks if he can store some boxes at her apartment. She later finds that the boxes contain books and weapons that are illegal for her to possess. Carlos offers to move the books but the Queen says no and promises to keep them safe.

The Queen makes a delivery for Carlos and begins to consider the revolutionary history of Chile. The two go on a date and are stopped by a police checkpoint but allowed to pass. Carlos brings the Queen to a public park on a hill. The Queen dances and Carlos photographs her. She is enraged when she realizes that he is not focused on her, but instead photographing the presidential motorcade as it drives past them.

The Queen has been hired to embroider a tablecloth with the national shield. She can't bring herself to do this and tells Carlos that she has changed. Carlos tells her that she needs to or else risk ruining his operation. The Queen questions him about his plans but Carlos yells and hits her in the face. In the end, the queen embroiders the tablecloth with the shield and delivers it to her client.

The queen throws a birthday party for Carlos and includes the children of the neighborhood in the celebrations. Carlos opens up to the Queen about his childhood. The Queen gives him a blowjob. In the morning, she finds Carlos gone and his co-conspirator, Laura, has arrived to take the boxes.

The Queen attends a protest against Pinochet, which is ended when the police arrive and threaten the protesters. The Queen talks back to the police and gets hit by an officer. She is told by another protester that there has been an attack on Pinochet. Later, she learns that the attempt was unsuccessful and assumes that Carlos was involved.

Laura comes to take the Queen to a safe spot, as the police are raiding any safe houses that have been connected to the attack. Laura drives the Queen out of the city, to where Carlos is hiding out. Carlos brings the Queen to the beach so she can see the ocean. He offers to bring her to Cuba, where he is fleeing too. The Queen declines his offer and Carlos leaves her alone on the beach.

== Cast ==
- Alfredo Castro as "la loca del frente"
- Leonardo Ortizgris as "Carlos"
- Amparo Noguera as "Doña Olguita"
- Sergio Hernández as "Rana"
- Julieta Zylberberg as "Laura"
- Luis Gnecco as "Myrna"
- Ezequiel Díaz as "Lupe"
- Paulina Urrutia as "Doña Clarita"
- Gastón Salgado as "Pimp"
- Erto Pantoja as "Bodyguard"
- Victor Montero as "Militar 1"
- Jaime Leiva as "Militar 2"
- Daniel Antivilo as "Toñita"
- Marcelo Alonso as "girl from the choir 1"
- Pedro Fontaine as "girl from the choir 2"
- Manuel Peña as "girl from the choir 3"
- Paula Leoncini as "detenaid woman"

== Production ==
For many years, the idea for a film adaptation of the novel by the Chilean artist Pedro Lemebel was being handled. Director Rodrigo Sepúlveda and Lemebel himself were strongly involved. There were many reasons that postponed the project, including lack of funding, disagreements between parts, film rights, authorship of the script, etc. There was much speculation about the problems among everyone involved in what the producer once called his "most ambitious project to date." Complications reached a very high point after Lemebel's death in 2015.

In 2019, it was announced that after signing a pre-agreement, the filming would begin with director Rodrigo Sepúlveda and a cast headed by the Chilean actor Alfredo Castro (according to Lemebel's own wishes). At the same time it was reported that two musicians and songwriters from Argentina and Chile would take care of the music, the incidental music would be in charge of Pedro Aznar and the arrangement and selection of songs (a fundamental part of the entire work) would be handled by Manuel García.

Subsequently, Leonardo Ortizgris and Julieta Zylberberg joined the cast, which is completed by Sergio Hernández, Luis Gnecco and Amparo Noguera.

The producers sought to release the film as part of the 2020 Berlin International Film Festival. Ultimately, the film premiered as part of the 2020 Venice Days.
