= HIV/AIDS in Chile =

The AIDS epidemic, caused by the emergence and spread of the human immunodeficiency virus (HIV), was first detected in Chile in 1984, with government response in the form of decrees and prevention campaigns starting in 1987. It is part of the Explicit Health Guarantees considered by the Ministry of Health since 2005, which means treatment is free or cheap depending on the patient's insurance. Before this, medication was often inaccessible due to shortages and pricing.

As of 2024, approximately 91,000 people are living with HIV in Chile, with the number of new infections increasing in the last ten years. Chile is the country in Latin America with the largest increase of new cases. The cases are concentrated in the northern regions and the Santiago Metropolitan Region, and immigrants make up a large percentage of them.

== History ==
The first known case of HIV/AIDS in Chile was taken to the press in July 1984, after it was presented in an infectology conference. The patient was a 38-year-old gay man called Edmundo Rodriguez, who died in August of that year in Santiago. The first woman to die of AIDS was a widow from Valparaíso; she had been infected by her mariner husband after he returned from voyage to the Caribbean. She died in 1986.

During the 1990s, most people living with HIV did not have access to medication, as hospitals did not have enough government-subsidized medications for their patients and had to raffle them based on lymphocyte counts and viral load, while private means were prohibitively expensive to most people. By 1999, according to UNAIDS, the treatments available through the public health system were enough for 70% of HIV carriers in Chile. Due to these shortages, black market options were pursued by many HIV-positive people. José Claro, businessman and grandson of president Gabriel González Videla, was arrested due to his trafficking of antiretroviral medication in December of 1998. Claro was known as "the benefactor" among a group of HIV-positive people in Chile, as he offered treatment for a cheaper price than most institutional lines.

In 2008, failures in notifications of diagnosis caused nearly 2,000 people to not know they were HIV-positive despite their health providers knowing so.

== Prevalence and demographics ==
According to a 2024 Ministry of Health report, 91,000 people are estimated to be living with HIV in Chile, with the number of cases rising by 86% in ten years. 71% of people living with HIV are in antiretroviral therapy, with 95% of them having achieved viral suppression.

Geographically, new cases have concentrated in the northern regions of Arica y Parinacota, Tarapacá, Antofagasta, and the Santiago Metropolitan Region.

Immigrants made up 35% of new cases in the 2020-2024 period, with 85% of these cases being people from other South American countries. Indigenous people made up 2.5% of new cases in this same time period. Mapuche people face particular struggles with the diagnosis of HIV due to perceptions of it as a distant, white illness, and not something they should experience.

The great majority of HIV cases in Chile have sex as the form of transmission, with 95.8% of new cases in 2024. Transmission due to intravenous drug use makes up less than 1% of cases.

Vertical transmission of HIV is rare, with less than 10 cases per year. Pregnant women notified of their HIV-positive status make up 19.8% of the women diagnosed in the 2020-2024 period. Of these pregnant women, 64.1% were immigrants; from 2015 onwards, most of these migrants are Haitian, whose cultural and linguistic barriers complicate adherence to treatment.

== Government response ==
A decree dealing with the epidemiological surveillance of HIV/AIDS was promulgated in 1987, as a precaution due to the rapid growth of HIV/AIDS elsewhere.

A law focusing on HIV/AIDS was passed in 2001, considering prevention, diagnosis and control of HIV, as well as the protection of the rights of carriers, as a national goal. It included anti-discrimination measures, as well as economic relief for those who were in debt due to the cost of HIV treatment, although this relief was a transitory measure only lasting until the end of 2006.

HIV/AIDS was considered among the initial 51 chronic diseases in the Explicit Health Guarantees considered in the National Health Fund in 2005. A 2010 study showed that after the guarantee of HIV/AIDS treatment was passed, hospitalizations and deaths related to them dropped notably.

== Prevention and treatment ==
Since 2019, pre-exposure prophylaxis (PrEP) is available for free to people considered at risk of HIV infection through the National Health Fund. Fourteen of sixteen regions have access to PrEP through public hospital pharmacies, with Los Ríos and Ñuble being the exceptions. Ministry of Health data reported that, as of October 2023, 2,980 people have enrolled in the public PrEP program, and that while it is used in the private sector, the amount of users there is not available.

Access to post-exposure prophylaxis (PEP) is guaranteed through the Explicit Health Guarantees system in cases of sexual violence.

Self-administered testing started to be available in Chile in 2023, following the Ministry of Health incorporating them to sanitary control measures in 2022.

Because of the Explicit Health Guarantees system including HIV/AIDS in its list of covered illnesses, diagnosis and treatment are free for people insured insured through the National Health Fund, and people insured through Isapres only have to pay 20%.

Despite many advances in treatment in the last few years, prevention is still a problem today. Some experts have cited a lack of adequate sexual education in schools, as most new infections have been in younger age cohorts.

== Activism ==
=== Organizations ===
There are many activist organizations in Chile. Some of the first organizations to be created were the CCPS or "corpo", Chilean Corporation for AIDS Prevention (Spanish: Corporación Chilena de Prevención del Sida), formed in 1987 in Santiago; and the CEPSS, Center of Education and Prevention of Social Health (Spanish: Centro de Educación y Prevención de Salud Social), formed in 1989 in the Biobío Region. Currently, the CCPS continues to operate under the name Acción Gay.

Currently, one of the organizations active in Chile is JEVIH, Young People and Students who Live with HIV (Spanish: Jóvenes y Estudiantes que Viven con VIH), formerly known as CEVVIH, Circle of Studednts Living with HIV (Spanish: Círculo de Estudiantes Viviendo con VIH), which was founded by a student of the University of Chile following his being diagnosed with HIV during a campaign for prevention in his university. Prevention, access to treatment and giving guidance to young people with HIV are among the organization's goals.

The International Candlelight AIDS Memorial began to be done in Chile in the early 1990s. World AIDS Day started being celebrated by the Chilean government in 1991.

=== Art ===
The performances and interventions of Las Yeguas del Apocalipsis, an artist duo active from 1987 to 1993, often dealt with matters of HIV/AIDS. Their performance "lo que el Sida se llevó" ('what AIDS took') involved a series of photographs of the duo dressed with the clothes of their travesti friends and posing in tribute to various Hollywood stars.
