= Rosabetty Muñoz =

Chilean poet and professor (born 1960)

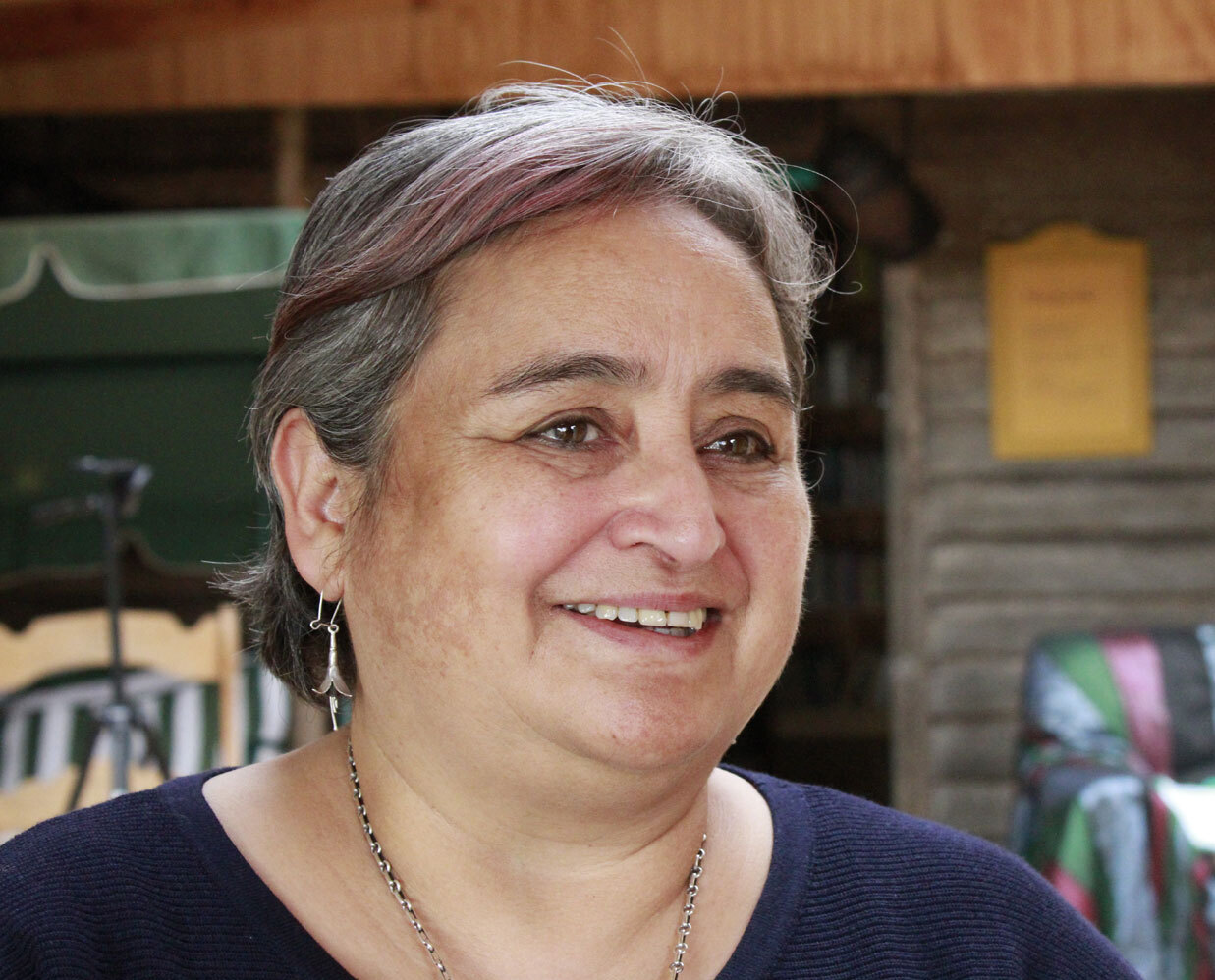
- Born: Rosabetty Muñoz Serón; 9 September 1960 (age 65); Ancud, Chile
- Education: Austral University of Chile
- Occupations: Poet, professor
- Years active: 1981–present
- Spouse: Juan Domingo Galleguillos Herrera
- Children: María José, Matías Nicanor, Juan Luis
- Awards: Pablo Neruda Award (2000); Altazor Award (2013)

Rosabetty Muñoz Serón (born 9 September 1960) is a Chilean poet and professor who is linked to the cultural movements Chaicura from Ancud, Aumen from Castro, and Índice and Matra from Valdivia. She is a recipient of the Pablo Neruda Award and the Poetry Altazor Award of the National Arts.

== Biography ==
Rosabetty Muñoz grew up in Ancud, and took her first steps as a poet in the Chaicura Group, directed by Mario Contreras Vega. She is a professor of Spanish at the Austral University of Chile.

She published her first book of poems, Canto de una oveja del rebaño, in 1981 as a university student in Valdivia. She also wrote most of her second book in that city, En lugar de morir, which was released in 1987. Her third book, Hijos (1991), was written, as she says, "after a black period [...], in which I thought the well of my poetry had run dry."

According to Iván Carrasco's description of ethnocultural discourse in Chilean poetry, whose authors include Rosabetty Muñoz, in her poetic production there is a sustained appreciation of the presence of syncretism between Catholicism and indigenous beliefs, observing a high intercultural and interethnic content (ethnocultural poetry). Furthermore, while some authors classify her within a group of writers assigned to the poetry of Southern Chile, Carrasco – referring to Hijos (1991) and Baile de señoritas (1994) – frames her work within the modern poetry of Chiloé, whose representatives use "a Spanish-Chilliche-Chono (Note: "Chilliche" is an archaism that alludes to "the people of Chile", to those who speak Mapuche.) intercultural lexicon and a high degree of awareness of poetic movements."

On her poetry – "which is characterized by reflecting southern Chile, dealing with gender issues and human relations and making poetry 'a space of resistance'" – Sergio Mansilla Torres has said: "In her verses, and closely following Vallejo, she expresses the vastness and depth of human pain, but lived and seen from the ontological condition of woman constituted in the cultural space of Chiloé previous or parallel to capitalist modernity", and "Her language, in simple appearance, almost minimalist, is actually very complex because of the metaphysical dimension it contains, that makes her poetry a kind of prayer or song that always moves toward recollection."

Rosabetty Muñoz has received several awards, among which are the 2000 Pablo Neruda Award for her work as a whole, and the National Book Council Award for Sombras en El Rosselot (2002) as the best unpublished work. In addition, she was nominated in the literary arts category, poetry mention of the 2009 Altazor Award for National Arts for En Nombre de Ninguna, referred to as a "remarkable contribution to world literature (...) [and] a deep and painful poetic entry in one of the many torn sides of the body of Chile," while in the 2012 edition, she won the award for Polvo de huesos.

She is married to the teacher and director of the Polivalente de Quemchi high school, Juan Galleguillos, with whom she has a daughter and two sons.

== Awards and recognitions ==
- First Prize in the 1982 Austral University of Chile Contest
- Third Place and First Mention in the 1985 Apollinaire Contest of Federico Santa María University
- Honorable Mention for the 1992 Santiago Municipal Literature Award for Hijos
- Honorable Mention for the 1996 Pablo Neruda Award
- 1998 Entel Award for Best Regional Writer
- Honorable Mention for the 1998 Santiago Municipal Poetry Award for La santa, historia de su elevación
- 2000 Pablo Neruda Award for the whole of her work
- 2002 National Book Council Award of Chile, best unpublished work, for Sombras en El Rosselot
- Finalist for the 2009 Altazor Award for En nombre de ninguna
- 2012 Los Lagos Regional Prize of Art and Culture
- 2013 Altazor Award for Polvo de huesos

== Works ==
=== Canto de una oveja del rebaño, El Kultrún, Valdivia, 1981 (2nd ed.: Ariel, Santiago, 1994) ===
The poems of this book are full of rebelliousness and hopelessness at the same time. However, it is also about resentment and the search of showing displeasure. All of this is evidenced in the poem "Grito de una oveja descarriada":

Hay que salir a la calle / y zarandear a todo el mundo, / traumatizarlos si es necesario. (p.25)

— Rosabetty Muñoz
Translation:

There's a need of going out and shaking everyone, traumatizing them if it is requested.

All these signs of revolution are strongly tackled in poems such as "Hay ovejas y ovejas", "Reintegración al rebaño", "Oveja que defiende su posición en el rebaño" and "Grito de una oveja descarriada".

=== En lugar de morir, editorial Cambio, 1987 ===
This work is about the time and fate concepts, the great ego owned by those who arrived to the Chiloe Archipelago with the confidence that nothing is stronger than them

Los hombres dicen que el gran universo / prendido en la noche / es lo único más grande que ellos. (p. 30).

— Rosabetty Muñoz
Translation:

Men say the only bigger than them is the grand universe lit at night.

It expresses the desire of lead the own path and choose their outcome, when there is no fate that can either be known or handle. Time and events can not be predicted or even be chosen: they will break down their ambitions by themselves.

=== Hijos, El Kultrún, Valdivia, 1991 ===
This poems book, composed by poems which show an evident toponymy of Chiloe, such as ”Chacao”, “Llingua”, “Caguach”, “Lemuy”, “isla Coldita”, “Metalqui”, among others, recall the issue of the marginalized motherhood, set in the Chiloe Archipelago, describing elements of its culture and showing, as in the previous works, characteristics of social criticism based on a context of forced miscegenation between foreigners and native women:

Para contarte de la isla, / cómo era antes de los depredadores. (p. 67).

— Rosabetty Muñoz
Translation:

For telling you about the isle, how it was before the predatory ones.

=== Baile de señoritas, El Kultrún, Valdivia, 1994 ===
This poems-compiling work is about the pillaging —in the full sense of the world: material, cultural and spiritual— suffered in the isle from the invaders arriving. Because:

…algunos siguen aquí esperando a puertas cerradas que se despejen las playas para salir a mariscar. (p. 76)

— Rosabetty Muñoz
Translation:

…some are still here behind closed doors, waiting for the beaches to clear up for going out to gather shellfish.

=== La santa, historia de una su elevación, LOM, Santiago, 1998 ===
This collection of poems, with titles such as “Ella carga recién nacidos”, “La culpa”, “Arden las velas de la devoción” and “Mi útero rememora”, includes many religious aspects that are expressed in the suffering of the woman: the saint, and that virtuous (and stereotyped) intrinsic holiness which she is searching to get rid of:

…cansada de la perfección / tratando de confundirse con los feligreses. (p. 92).

— Rosabetty Muñoz
Translation:

…tired of being perfect, [she was] trying to get mixed up with the parishioners.

=== Sombras en El Rosselot, LOM, Santiago, 2002 ===
Work inspired by the bohemian life in the south of Chile, specifically in a brothel: El Rosselot. Within its poems such as “Casa de citas”, “Festivas”, “Espectros”, “Huellas” and “Río nocturno”, it can be inferred the desolate spectral presence of the women who used to work in those places in verses such:

Una vez más el sonido de puertas / música intolerable y golpetear de uñas. / Arrastran sillas. Se ríen de mí. (p. 122).

— Rosabetty Muñoz
Translation:

Once more, the sound of doors, unbearable music and the tap of nails. They drag chairs. They make fun of me.

=== Ratada, LOM, Santiago, 2005 ===
Poems in this book are focus on a situation within the author's background; an invading infestation of rats in the south of Chile. In always-inside-parentheses poems such as “(En esas playas)”, “(Al olor de la desgracia)”, “(Se encabrita el miedo)”, “(El diente filoso de la rata)” and “(Tan enorme plaga)”, it can be observed a putrid environment, and from the author's view, for being there “it is necessary being defeated”.

Some people say this work is a metaphor of the Chilean society during the military dictatorship, whereas another describe the rats, in an allegoric way, as “the invasion of the modernity that is set up in the town.”

=== En nombre de ninguna, El Kultrún, Valdivia, 2008 ===
With titles as “Boca de río”, “Vuelo y caída”, “La sombra de la hija”, “Apartar los zumbidos”, “Siempreviva”, “Misterios gozoso and “En nombre de ninguna”, this work of Rosabetty Muñoz is, probably, one of her most recognized poetry books. It captures testimonies of women who miscarry and writes about incest and girls who were sexually abused with a direct style that does not require further interpretation. Motherhood and destroyed childhood are the main theme.

…estas jovencitas / con sus crías en bolsas negras. (…) En pecado mortal / están las hijas de la patria. / Actúan ellas en nombre de ninguna. (p. 168).

— Rosabetty Muñoz
Translation:

…this young girls / with her children into black bags. (…) In deadly sin / there are the homeland's daughters. / They act on behalfs of none.

=== Polvo de huesos, anthology edited by Kurt Folch; Ediciones Tácitas, Santiago, 2012 ===
This is the first poetry anthology (so far) belonging to the author, whose selection and prologue were written by Kurt Folch. These collected work, winner of the Poetry Altazor Award of the National Arts in 2013 and composed of ten poem books —two unpublished yet— and an unpublished work written in prose, has as main characteristic the approach to the Chiloé's community, city where Rosabetty was born, grew up and, currently, is living. The author addresses issues such as rebelliousness and hopelessness, the abuse of authority by a few "invaders", and even those more controversial issues that have a greater impact on the society such as abortion, sexual abuse and incest.
