= Brígida Walker =

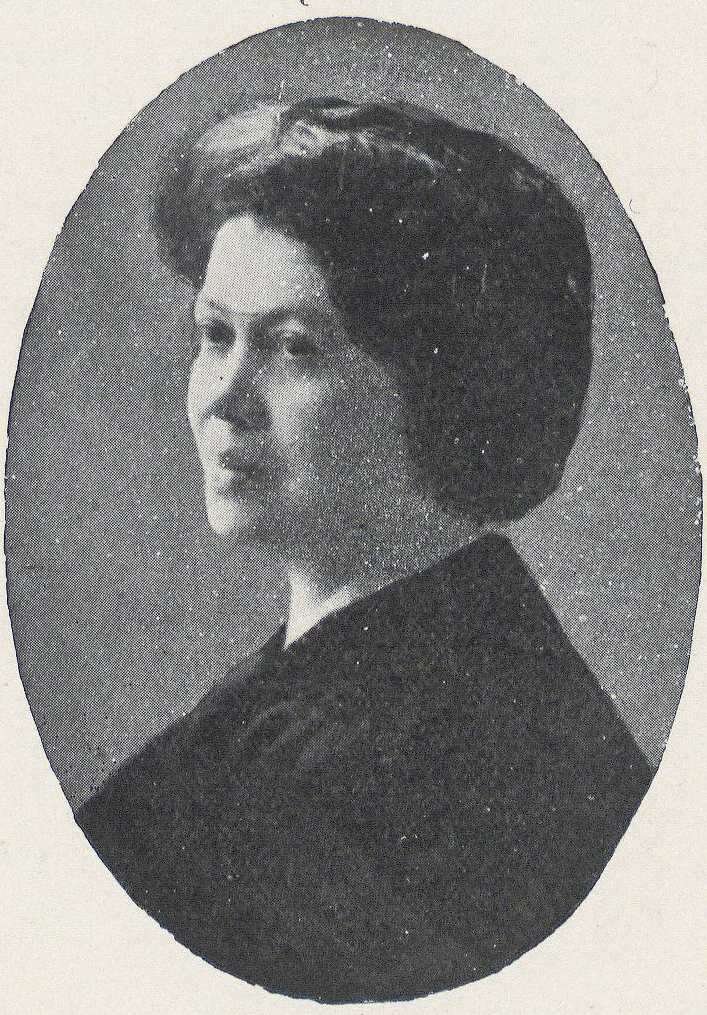
Brígida Walker

Brígida Walker Guerra (August 22, 1863 – 1942) was a Chilean teacher.

Born in Copiapó in 1863, she was the daughter of Juan Walker Fleming and Rosario Guerra. She obtained her early education in Valparaíso at the Girls' High School and later graduated from the Teachers' Normal School of Santiago in 1889. She made her career as a teacher and was honoured by various public appointments. In 1905, she became a member of the committee to organize the Teachers' Normal School of Valparaiso. In 1911, she served on the committee which was sent to Buenos Aires and Montevideo to study normal schools. From 1908 to 1913, she was a member of the Council of Primary School Education. She then became the head of the First Teachers' Normal School for Women of Santiago. She wrote on educational subjects and her works include: Curso de Pedagojta, translated from the French, 1917; Desarrollo del Programa Moral, 1919; Detalle del Programa de Educacion Cívica, 1919.
