= Raquel Señoret =

Chilean poet (1922–1990)

Raquel Señoret (October 10, 1922 – November 27, 1990) was a Chilean poet. She was the youngest daughter of the Chilean ambassador to London. On 8 June 1940, aged seventeen, she married John Watney and they had three children: Lucas, Javier, and Paula. Watney's first published book, Sunstroke, was dedicated to her.

Even at that young age, she was writing poetry. She considered her poems her most precious possessions and kept them stored in a hat-box for easy evacuation should the house be bombed. The marriage did not last and they were divorced on 18 June 1945. She returned to Chile on 4 July 1945. They remained friends and corresponded with each other until her death in 1990. Their time together in 1940 is described in Watney's book He Also Served (Hamish Hamilton, 1971, SBN 241 02011 5).

Senoret wrote cantos with verses of three long lines each. Her most important work is Anagogias (Ediciones Documentas, Guayaquil, 1988), an anthology of three separate works, each consisting of a dozen or more cantos: El Infinito y su Reflejo (The Infinite and its Reflex), El Sortilegio de la Imaginacion (The Sortilege of Imagination), and Presencia en el Tiempo (Presence of Time).
