= Erick Pohlhammer =

Chilean poet (1955–2023)

- Born: Erick Swen Pohlhammer Boccardo; 5 February 1955; Santiago, Chile
- Died: 22 May 2023 (aged 68)
- Education: University of Miami
- Occupations: Writer, professor
- Notable work: Vírgenes de Chile
- Relatives: Sergio Livingstone (uncle)
- Awards: Pablo Neruda Award (1993); Santiago Municipal Literature Award (2008)

Erick Swen Pohlhammer Boccardo (5 February 1955 – 22 May 2023) was a Chilean poet of the Generation of the 80s, a self-described "media figure, traveler, compulsive reader, Zen Buddhist, and expert in both academic and pop culture."

== Biography ==
Erick Pohlhammer studied at The Grange School, from which he graduated in 1972 and then entered the Catholic University, where he obtained the title of professor of Castilian. At the same time, he studied aesthetics, a degree he did not complete because he decided to go to the United States where he earned a postgraduate degree in education at the University of Miami.

Passionate about football, Pohlhammer, who is the nephew of the legendary "Sapo" Livingstone, played in his youth for his alma mater's sports club; he was under-15, under-16, and under-17 captain on squads with players such as Orlando Ramírez, under the direction of Fernando Riera. During his youth he practiced amateur boxing; he won 37 victories (32 of them by knockout) on the La Reina–Peñalolén circuit. He was champion of that neighborhood in a tournament held at the José Arrieta Guindos Stadium and, later, from the English schools of Santiago. He also participated in rugby and swimming.

Pohlhammer published his first book in 1979, but fell in love with writing earlier, as he himself said, at age 19, when he was in his second year of university. His first important recognition came in 1993, when he was granted the Pablo Neruda Award. Later he received other distinctions, including the 2008 Santiago Municipal Literature Award for his poetry collection Vírgenes de Chile.

In 2015 he held his first exhibition of digital prints, Pic-poemas.

Pohlhammer taught literature courses at various universities and conducted workshops. He has participated as a panelist and writer on various television programs (Teatro terapia, Lo mejor del Mundial, ¿Cuánto vale el show?, Sin Dios ni late, Síganme los buenos) and has been president of the Union of Chilean Poets and minister of happiness of the cultural-political movement Por un Chile Participativo y Feliz. He was interested in breathing techniques and considered Prem Rawat one of his teachers.

Pohlhammer died from complications of a stroke on 22 May 2023, at the age of 68.

== Works ==
=== Poetry collections ===
- Epístolas iluminadas entre parejas disueltas, 1979
- Tiempos difíciles, 1979
- Es mi segundo set de poemas, 1985
- Gracias por la atención dispensada, Editorial Sin Fronteras, 1986
- Vírgenes de Chile, Editorial Brodura, 2007
- La hamaca interior, proverbs and poems, Editorial Libros de Mentira, 2010
- Me que la vaca mu, Editorial Lamás médula, Buenos Aires, 2013
- Primera y última, anthology, Lolita editores, 2014, 98 pages, ISBN 978-956-8970-51-2
- Bajo la influencia de la poesía, Libros del Amanecer, Santiago de Chile, 2017

=== Other books ===
- El fútbol como la vida, Editorial Universidad Bolivariana, stories, 2007, ISBN 978-956-8024-70-3
- Redonda pasión. Épica y lírica del fútbol chileno, as compiler, together with journalist Juan Oyaneder, 2011
- Oxímoron. Conversaciones con Dino Samoiedo, with foreword by Camilo Marks; RIL editores, Santiago, 2013

=== Exhibitions ===
- Pic-poemas, digital prints; Galería Modigliani, Viña del Mar, 2015

== Awards and recognitions ==
- 1993 Pablo Neruda Award (Pablo Neruda Foundation)
- 1993 Don Balón Award for sports poetry (Don Balón magazine)
- 2002 Fray Luis de León Award (Spain)
- 2008 Santiago Municipal Literature Award for the poetry collection Vírgenes de Chile
