= Pedro Lemebel =

Chilean writer, chronicler, and performer

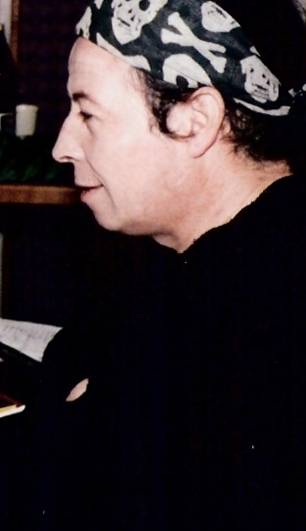
- Lemebel in 2011
- Born: Pedro Segundo Mardones Lemebel; 21 November 1952; Santiago, Chile
- Died: 23 January 2015 (aged 62); Santiago, Chile
- Education: University of Chile
- Occupations: Reporter, performance artist, chronicler
- Writing career
- Language: Spanish

Pedro Segundo Mardones Lemebel (21 November 1952 – 23 January 2015) was a Chilean essayist, chronicler, performer and novelist. He was openly gay and known for his cutting critique of authoritarianism and for his humorous depiction of Chilean popular culture, from a queer perspective. He was nominated for Chile's National Literature Prize in 2014. He died of laryngeal cancer on 23 January 2015 in Santiago, Chile.

== Life ==
=== Early career ===
Lemebel was born in El Zanjón de la Aguada, a poor neighborhood in Santiago on the banks of Zanjón de la Aguada, an irrigation canal that flows into the Mapocho river; to the family of Pedro Mardones Paredes and Violeta Lemebel. In the late 1980s, he chose to be identified by his mother's surname, Lemebel, as his choice for surname instead of his father's (Mardones), as is the norm in most Latin American countries. He attended an industrial school of carpentry and metal forging at the Industrial de Hombres de La Legua High School and later studied plastic art at University of Chile's Art School. He subsequently became a high school art teacher but was let go based on the presumption of his homosexuality.

Lemebel attended writing workshops to hone his skills and network with other writers, his first writing recognition was in 1982, when he won an award for his short story, Porque el tiempo está cerca. In 1986, he published as his first major work, the book Incontables, a compilation of short stories under the feminist publication label, Ergo Sum. A year later, he co-founded a performance collective that used the tactics of intervention and disruption of events to raise public consciousness about the struggles of minorities in Chile. The disruption and performances of the collective brought Lemebel into the public limelight in Chile. In 1986, he disrupted a meeting of Chile's left-wing groups opposed to Augusto Pinochet's dictatorship. He entered the meeting in high heels and with makeup on his face depicting a hammer and sickle extending from his mouth to his left eyebrow. At the event, he spoke about his manifesto, ‘Manifest: I Speak for my Difference’ criticizing homophobia in left-wing politics.

Lemebel was widely known as a communist. Being distant from the Communist Party, he was a close friend of its leader, Gladys Marín, until her death in 2005.

=== Yeguas del Apocalipsis ===
In 1987, Lemebel co-founded a group with Francisco Casas Silva, poet, artist and student of literature. The duo called themselves Las Yeguas del Apocalipsis ('Mares of the Apocalypse'), a reference to the biblical "Horsemen of the Apocalypse" that appear in the New Testament. This performing duo made appearances sabotaging book launches, art expositions and even political discussions. Their appearances were usually surprising, provocative and demonstrated an aspect of counter-culture.

Around this time he decided to abandon his paternal last name, Mardones, and begin using that of his mother, Lemebel. In an interview the writer would explain his choice of name change as the following, "Lemebel is a gesture of femininity, to engrave a maternal last name, to acknowledge my (washer) mother in light of the illegality of homosexual(s) and transvestite(s)."

The first intervention/performance of "The Mares of the Apocalypse" was on the afternoon of October 22, 1988, during the second installment of the Pablo Neruda prize to poet Raúl Zurita in La Chascona. In the middle of the ceremony, Lemebel and Casas appeared offering Zurita a crown of thorns that the poet did not accept.

Between 1987 and 1995, "The Mares of the Apocalypse" carried out at least fifteen public interventions and in total no more than twenty. The majority of these events were in Santiago but some were also in Concepción, Chile. Some of their public demonstrations included dancing the Cueca on broken glass, dressing up as Frida Kahlo and even dressing up as Lady Godiva and riding around naked on white horses for the art department at the University of Chile.

Their work together stopped being constant around 1993, after which both focused on their own respective literary careers.

=== Urban chronicles and other writings ===
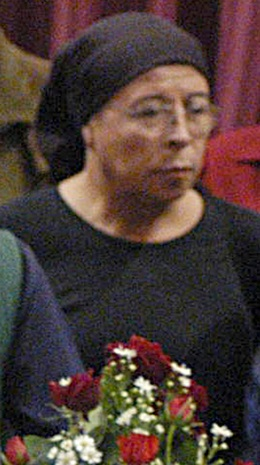
Lemebel in 2013

Earlier in his career, Lemebel had attended workshops of the Society of Chilean Writers and gained the friendship of some feminist writers such as Pía Barros who later helped published his first book, Incontables. He returned to writing in the 1990s starting with a series of urban chronicles that were published in Chilean newspapers, and magazines and read on the radio. In 1995 and 1996, Lemebel wrote two books in a chronicle and hybrid literary style, a combination of reportage, memoir, public address, fiction and socio-political historical analysis. In 1995, he published La Esquina es mi corazón: Crónica urbana (The Corner is My Heart), writing about Chilean history from the perspectives of young adults raised in poor neighborhoods and those who are stigmatized socially. In 1996, he published Loco afán: Crónicas de sidario (Mad Urge: AIDS Chronicles), a piece of 31 short texts and images that detailed the journey of a group of marginalized gay youths in Chile through the period of dictatorship to the outbreak of AIDS. Lemebel was given a Guggenheim Foundation scholarship in 1999 for his literary accomplishments leading to increase appearances in forums and seminars in Chile and US.

In 1995, Lemebel published (in addition to his first book titled La Esquina es mi corazón) his first collection of Chronicles some of which had their first appearances in newspapers and magazines titled "Página Abierta," "Punto Final," and "La Nación." In these chronicles Lemebel referenced the many marginalized setting of Santiago which he linked to themes of homosexuality, prostitution and poverty, some of which were taboo to talk about at the time. The following year he created the program "Cancionero" for the radio show "Radio Tierra." In this program he would read his chronicles accompanied by sounds or even music. That same year he published "Loco afán: Crónicas de si dario," his second book of chronicles that spoke about themes like AIDS and the marginalization of transvestites.

He gained international recognition with his novel Tengo miedo torero which was his first book translated into English. In 2013, he was given the José Donoso Award. He died of laryngeal cancer in January 2015.

== International recognition ==
In 1999, thanks to the influences of his friend, Chilean writer Roberto Bolaño, who had immigrated to Europe from Mexico in 1977 and has since lived in Spain, his book Loco Afán: Crónicas de Sidario was published for the Barcelona-based Spanish editorial Anagrama, becoming his first work published abroad. Since then, his written work began to attract the interest of various universities and international educational institutions.

That same year he also participated in the Festival of Guadalajara, Mexico, in replacement of Bolaño who had rejected the offer, and accepted praise for his work of the famous writer Carlos Monsiváis.

In 2001 he published his first novel Tengo miedo torero a difficult story of contextualized love during the attempt on the life of Augusto Pinochet (7 September 1986). For the presentation of the book, Lemebel arrived in a red dress with a feathered headdress, at a ceremony with many people that was public including politicians, filmmakers, journalists and a few writers. The book would later gain international recognition after being translated into English by Katherine Silver, then French and Italian.

In 2003 he continued his work as a journalist, publishing his anthology of Chronicles Zanjón de la Aguada, that spoke of the gay community in neighborhoods of distinctive social classes in Santiago and where appeared some real people like the social leader and president of the Agrupación de Familiares de Detenidos Desaparecidos (AFDD) Sola Sierra. This work was followed a year later by Adios Mariquita Linda, another anthology of chronicles that maintained the same tendencies of his previous works.

In 2008 his sixth book of chronicles appeared, titled Serenata Carfiola.

On November 29, 2012, Lemebel participated in the "Feria del Libro de Guadalajara," publishing his new book of chronicles, titled Háblame de amores, showing a dramatization of his work "Susurrucucu Paloma."

On September 4, 2013, Lemebel was awarded the "Premio José Donoso," which he dedicated to his mother, the deceased Gladys Marín, and his readers belonging to the working class.

== List of works ==
- La esquina es mi corazón.
- Loco afán: Crónicas de sidario (chronicles). Santiago: LOM, 1996.
- De perlas y cicatrices (chronicles). Santiago: LOM, 1998.
- Tengo miedo torero (novel). Santiago: Grupo Editorial Planeta, 2001. (Translated as My Tender Matador by Katherine Silver, published by Grove in 2005.)
- La esquina es mi corazón (chronicles). Santiago: Seix Barral, 2001.
- Zanjón de la Aguada. Santiago: Seix Barral, 2003.
- Adiós, mariquita linda.
- Serenata cafiola.
- Háblame de amores.
- Poco hombre.
- Mi amiga Gladys.
- Tengo miedo torero (script), 2015. (Translated as My Tender Matador for the film.)

== Unedited works and posthumous publications ==
In an interview in 2013, during the publication of the anthology Poco Hombre , Pedro Lemebel announced he was working on two literary projects that would soon see the light and then, after his death, they were truncated: one of them is Mi Amiga Gladys, a book of chronicles about Gladys Marín, leader and representative of the Communist Party of Chile and was deceased in 2005.

Josephina Alemparte, editor of Seal Planet, declared that the book was going to be presented at the book fair of Santiago but for health reasons this was postponed. Finally, the Planet editorial published the book on the second of November in the year 2016. At the end of the same month they published Arder, a book that is compiled of images of the homonymous exposure and that extensively gathered his audio visual work.

Likewise he also announced the publication of a box set of all his books since La Esquina es mi corazón (1995) and until Háblame de Armores (2012) (possibly including Mi Amiga Gladys, 2016) and a documentary addressed to Joanna Reposi, that contains seven years of records.

Another book that was found was titled El éxtasis de delinquir, that would be his second book since Tengo miedo torero (2001). This work centers in the history of Patricio Egaña, who provided drugs to Claudio Spiniak. Since the year 2011 he began to mention in interviews that he was writing a new novel intended for release in 2016 or 2017 to be published by the Planet editorial.

== Awards and prizes ==
- 1983: First Prize in the Contest of the Compensation Fund of Javier Carrera for "Porque el tiempo está cerca"
- 1999: Guggenheim Fellowship
- 2002: Nominated for the Altazor Award for "Tengo miedo torero"
- 2004: Nominated for the Altazor Award for "Zanjón de la Aguada"
- 2006: Nominated for the Altazor Award in Literary Essay for "Adiós, mariquita linda"
- 2006: Anna Seghers-Preis
- 2006: Nominated for the Altazor Award for the theatrical version of "Tengo miedo torero"
- 2013: Nominated for the Altazor Award in Essays and Memoirs for "Háblame de amores"
- 2013: es:Premio José Donoso
- 2014: Nominated for the Altazor Award in Essays and Memoirs for "Poco hombre"
- 2014: Nominated for the Chilean National Prize for Literature

== Style ==
In his works, Lemebel addresses Chilean Marginalization with some autobiographical references. With a poetic prose that is at the same time self-deprecating, consequential, refers to an "other", irreverent, over elaborate and corny, he mixes reality with fiction, which he uses to denounce the "silicone" parts of his works. His works are usually tragic-comedies and aggressive, in constant rejection of right wing politics and the Chilean upper class.

Mexican writer Carlos Monsiváis associates his aesthetic criticisms with those of Néstor Perlongher, Joaquín Hurtado and to a lesser extent with Reinaldo Arenas, Severo Sarduy and Manuel Puig; with the first three, for their "vindicating anger", with Sarduy for his "radical experimentation" and with Puig for his "witty incorporation and victory of proscribed sensitivity." For Monsiváis, Lemebel and all these authors, homosexuality is not an artistic identity so much as a literary attitude. Perlongher too shares a style of baroque or over elaborate writing, but Lemebel does not look to confuse anyone. In his related Chronicles about AIDS, he employs a modernist and postmodernist view that is similar to Julián del Casal, Amado Nervo and Enrique Gómez Carrillo.

== Death ==
Pedro Lemebel died on January 23, 2015, in Santiago, Chile, of laryngeal cancer. Once the news went around of his death, countless newspapers paid tribute and condolences. He was well-known and recognized for his extravagant personality and for referring to himself as a "queen." Hundreds of people from all walks of life attended his funeral service, from celebrities to politicians. His extensive efforts in breaking the norm through his unique self-expression in his written works and activism have left a lasting impact on society and are part of his legacy. His remains are buried in the Metropolitan Cemetery of Santiago.

== Influence and legacy ==
Lemebel is well known for his influence in the fight for homosexual rights, his work as a writer, and his strong political side. Lemebel was much more than a writer; he was a free man, an artist, a political and popular icon, but more than anything a rebel and a voice for the homosexual community.

Lemebel was born as Pedro Mardones Lemebel, but when he decided to take the last name of his mother, was the first big political decision that reaffirmed his commitment towards his homosexual side, a side that was later incorporated into his literary works. Lemebel was able to envisage a hidden reality of homosexuals; he was able to unmask the violence of which homosexuals were victims in Chile. The importance of Pedro Lemebel is not only value for his talent as a writer, but also as a person full of defiance in a conservative and machista country. Óscar Contardo describes Lemebel as a “popular figure: a figure that is supposed to be disgusted in our society, which is the "loca" (queen), he managed to make that figure as the center, and then transform it into a popular icon."

Although Lemebel was never a formal militant, he was a follower of PC (partido comunista/Communist party). Until his death, Lemebel worked in his book that revealed his friendship with the deceased Gladys Marin, titled "Mi querida Gladys." Daniel Alcaíno, friend of Lemebel, believes that beyond politics, Lemebel's legacy was other. “Beyond the left wing and politics, he was an institution. Pedro was heavily connected with the color red, but not with the red of the political party, but with the red of blood. Blood of the humble and simple people. That is what he is remember for.”

He was profiled in the 2019 documentary film Lemebel, by filmmaker Joanna Reposi Garibaldi.
