= Punto Final =

Former political magazine in Chile (1965–2018)

- Categories: News and political magazine
- Frequency: Biweekly
- Founded: 1965
- First issue: September 1965
- Final issue Number: March 2018; 894
- Country: Chile
- Based in: Santiago
- Language: Spanish
- Website: Punto Final

Punto Final was a biweekly news and political magazine published in Santiago, Chile. The magazine was in circulation between September 1965 and 9 March 2018.

== History and profile ==
Punto Final was established in 1965. The first issue appeared in September 1965. The magazine was published on a fortnightly basis and had its headquarters in Santiago. It had a left-wing political stance and had close links to the Revolutionary Left Movement (Movimiento de Izquierda Revolucionario). The magazine announced that it had ceased publication following the issue 894 which was published on 9 March 2018.
