= Pía Barros =

Chilean writer (born 1956)

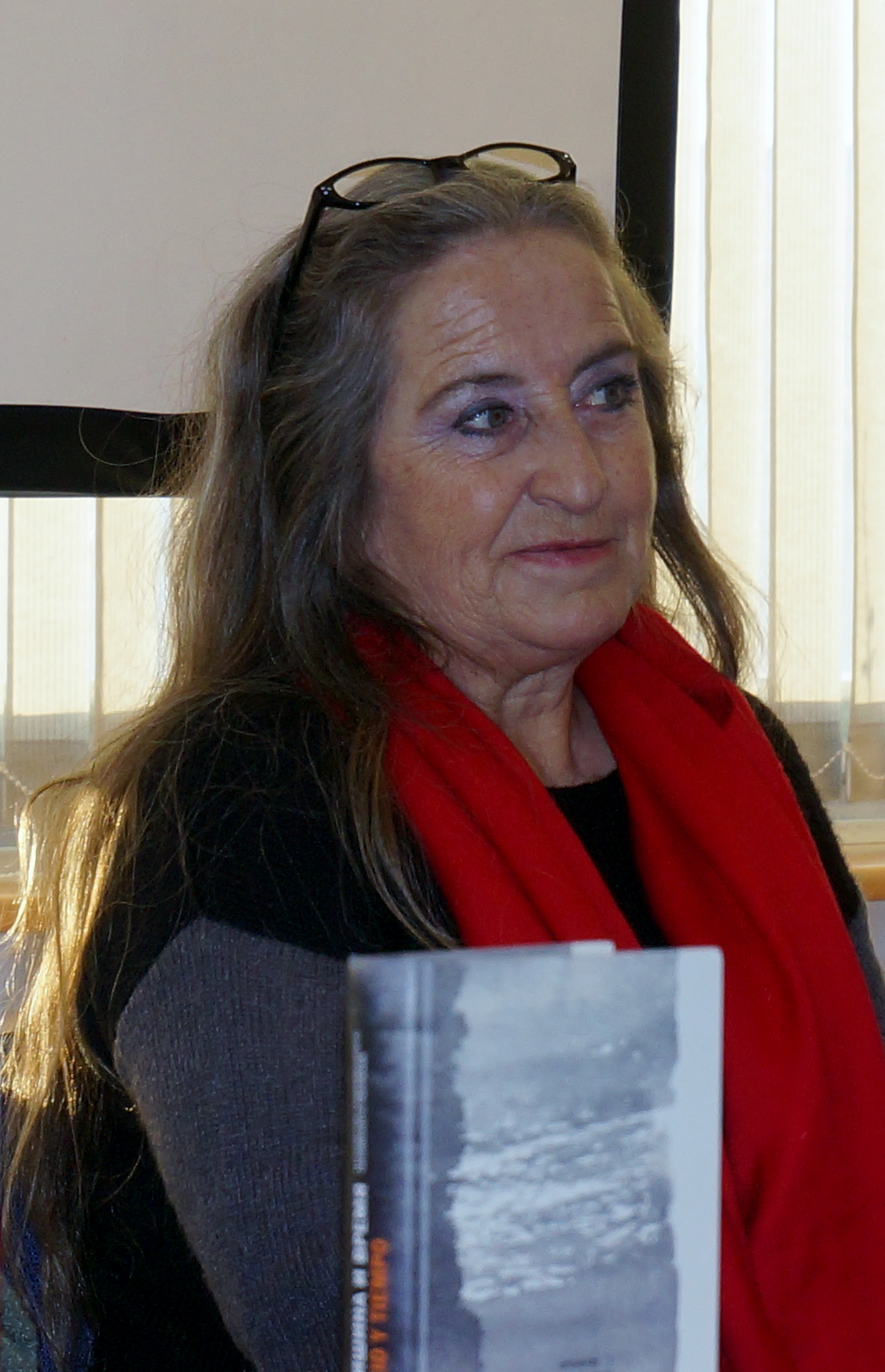
- At the 2015 Moscow International Non-Fiction Fair
- Born: Pía Barros Bravo; 20 January 1956 (age 70); Melipilla, Chile
- Occupation: Writer
- Spouse: Jorge Montealegre
- Awards: Altazor Award (2011)

Pía Barros Bravo (born 20 January 1956) is a Chilean writer, best known for her short stories. She is associated with her country's literary Generation of '80.

== Biography ==
Pía Barros left Melipilla, the city where she grew up, "without sorrow", together with "a good girl's destiny and the memory of the mare to which, from the age of seven, she told her poems." She moved to Santiago to study pedagogy in Spanish. There she also attended the workshop of Carlos Ruiz-Tagle (later, she herself would hold a famous workshop), who recommended that she stop "perpetrating poems on defenseless people" and devote herself to narrative. In 1989 she was a visiting professor at the University of Oregon, United States.

Pía Barros, who declares herself "a very honored feminist", has stood out for her short stories, although she has also written some novels. In addition, she has published some 30 object books with literary material illustrated by prominent Chilean graphic artists, which have earned her the FONDART (National Fund for Cultural Development and the Arts) fellowship on two occasions. She also received a fellowship from the Andes Foundation, with which she wrote the first digitally distributed novel in Chile, Lo que ya nos encontró, and also a writer's fellowship from the National Book and Reading Council.

Her stories have been published in more than 30 anthologies, from countries such as Chile, Germany, Costa Rica, Ecuador, the United States (some translated by Martha Manier, Diane Russell, Analisa Taylor, Amanda Powell, Jacquline Nanfito, Resha Cardone, and Jane Griffin), France, Italy, Russia, and Venezuela. In Chile, they share a publication with stories by writers such as Roberto Bolaño, Alberto Fuguet, Antonio Skarmeta, Diamela Eltit, and Isabel Allende.

Barros has directed the literary workshop Ergo Sum since 1986. She is also the director of Ediciones Asterión.

She is married to the poet and journalist Jorge Montealegre. They have been a couple since the early 1980s and have two daughters: Abril, a textile artist, and Miranda, a writer.

== Works ==
- Miedos transitorios (de a uno, de a dos, de a todos), short stories, Ediciones Ergo Sum, 1985 (bilingual English-Spanish edition, 1993)
- A horcajadas, Mosquito Editores, Santiago, 1990 (bilingual English-Spanish edition, 1992). Contains 14 stories:
  - "Prefiguración de una huella", "Iniciaciones", "Conmiseración", "Olor a madera y a silencio", "Mordaza", "Desfiladero de Iguanas", "Diccionarios", "Duerme", "Artemisa", "Lo había odiado con pulcritud", "Navegaciones", "Trece", "Deshabitados ante la ventana", and "Los pequeños papeles"
- El tono menor del deseo, novel, Editorial Cuarto Propio, Santiago, 1991
- Astride, novel (bilingual edition by Analissa Taylor, 1992)
- Signos bajo la piel, stories, editorial Grijalbo, Santiago, 1994
- Ropa usada, stories, Ediciones Asterión, Santiago, 2000
- Lo que ya nos encontró, digital novel, Chilelibro.com, 2001
- Los que sobran, stories, Asterión, Santiago, 2002
- Llamadas perdidas, minifictions, Thule Ediciones, Barcelona, 2006
- La Grandmother y otros, microstories, Asterión, Santiago, 2008
- El lugar del otro, microstories, Asterión, Santiago, 2010
- Las tristes, microstories, Asterión, Santiago, 2015
- Hebras, microstories, Asterión, Santiago, 2020

=== Stories in anthologies ===
- "Artemisa", in Andar con cuentos: nueva narrativa chilena 1948-1962, Mosquito Editores, Santiago, 1992
- "Baldosas", in Bajo techo, Ministry of Housing and Urbanism, Santiago, 1995
- "Muertes", in Salidas de madre, Planeta Chile, Santiago, 1996
- "Puertas", in Cuentos: Taller Soffia '84 (Chile, Arcilla, 1984)
- "El orden de las cosas", in Cuentos chilenos contemporáneos 2000, (LOM Ediciones, Santiago, 2001)

== Awards and distinctions ==
- Finalist for the 2003 Altazor Award with Los que sobran
- Finalist for the 2008 Altazor Award with La Grandmother y otros
- 2011 Altazor Award for El lugar del otro
- 2015 Lygia Fagundes Telles Award, given during the 8th Conference of Women Writers of Brazil
- Fellowships from Fondart, Andes Foundation, and National Book and Reading Council
