= Pablo Neruda Award =

Under 40 writers

Pablo Neruda Prize for Young Poetry
- Named for Pablo Neruda
- Awarded for: Poet under 40
- Sponsored by: Pablo Neruda Foundation
- Location: La Chascona house, Santiago
- Country: Chile
- First award: 1987
- Currently held by: Gladys González
- Website: fundacionneruda.org/en/

The Pablo Neruda Prize for Young Poetry (Spanish: Premio Pablo Neruda de Poesía Joven) is a literary award granted annually by the Pablo Neruda Foundation since 1987. It recognizes an author under 40 who is actively writing. It consists of a diploma, a medal, and US$6,000, which are presented at La Chascona house museum in Santiago.

== History ==
The creation of the Pablo Neruda Award was announced in July 1987 as part of the commemoration of the 83rd anniversary of the poet's birth. When announcing it, the Pablo Neruda Foundation stipulated that it would be granted annually to a Chilean writer, less than 40 years old, initially endowed with $3,000. This was later increased to $6,000.

At first, the award was given to an author for works including poetry, creative prose, and theater. Later the award changed to its current format, as it would be granted only to poets and, according to the Foundation's website, "in practice, was never granted to authors of other genres."

In 2006 the Neruda Foundation published an anthology with the winners, which ranged from Gonzalo Millán, the first in 1987, to Germán Carrasco, who received it in 2005.

== Winners ==
Year	Winner	Photo
1987	Gonzalo Millán	
1988	Raúl Zurita	
1989	Diego Maquieira	
1990	Clemente Riedemann	
1991	Carlos Alberto Trujillo	
1992	Teresa Calderón	
1993	Erick Pohlhammer	
1994	Alicia Salinas	
1995	Tomás Harris	
1996	José María Memet	
1997	Isabel Gómez Muñoz	
1999	Bernardo Chandía	
2000	Rosabetty Muñoz	
2001	Andrés Morales	
2002	Armando Roa Vial	
2003	Jaime Luis Huenún	
2004	Víctor Hugo Díaz	
2005	Germán Carrasco	
2006	Malú Urriola	
2007	Javier Bello	
2008	Rafael Rubio	
2009	Héctor Hernández Montecinos	
2010	Christian Formoso	
2011	Julio Espinosa Guerra	
2012	Leonardo Sanhueza	
2013	Juan Cristóbal Romero	
2014	Andrés Anwandter	
2015	Paula Ilabaca Núñez	
2016	Gloria Dünkler	
2017	Marcelo Guajardo Thomas	
2018	Ernesto González Barnert	
2019	Gladys González	
