= Isabel Gómez Muñoz =

Chilean poet

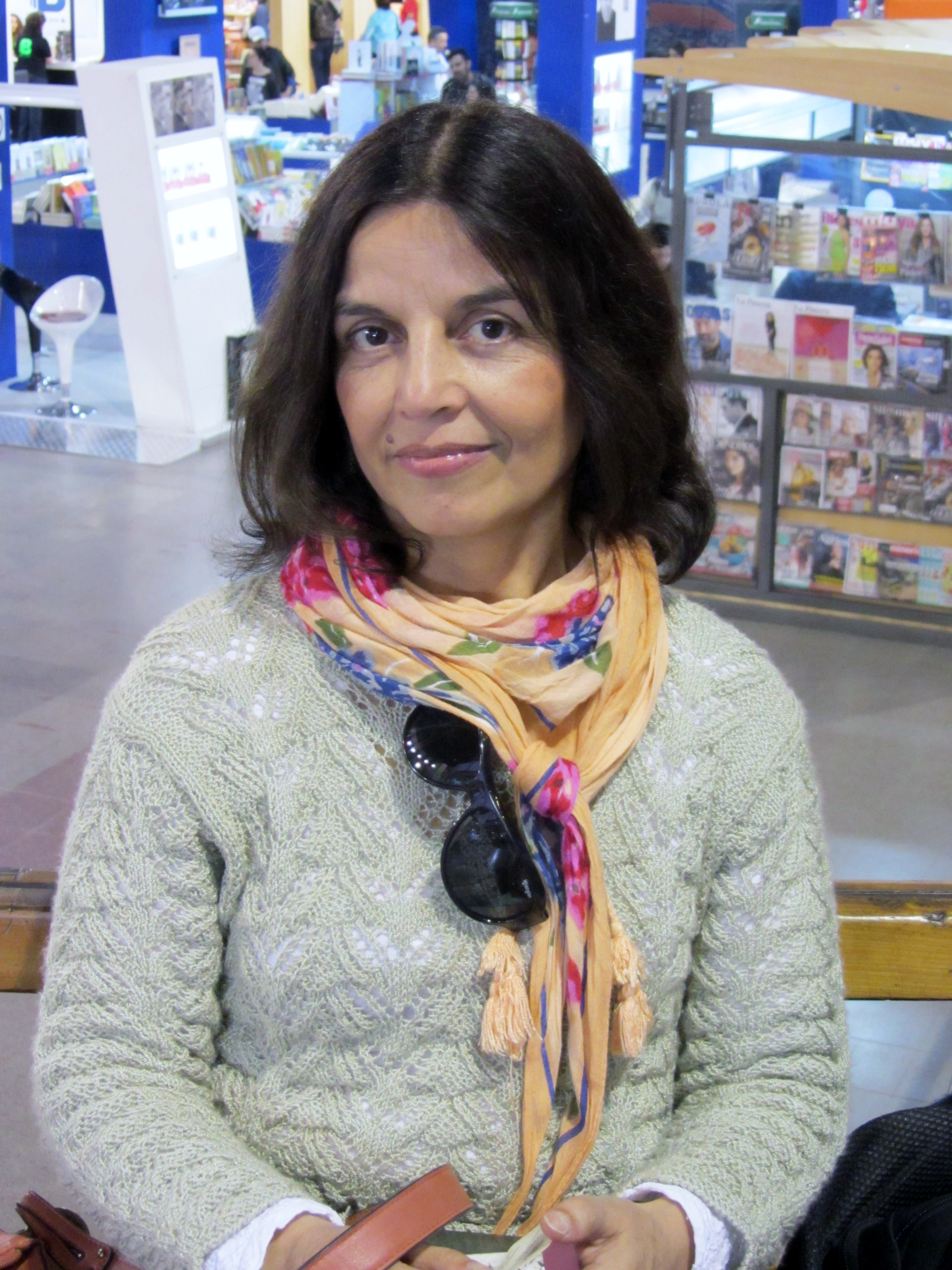
- At FILSA 2015
- Born: María Isabel Gómez Muñoz; 3 October 1959 (age 66); Curicó, Chile
- Education: University of Los Lagos
- Occupations: Writer, librarian
- Awards: Pablo Neruda Award (1997)

Isabel Gómez Muñoz (born 3 October 1959) is a Chilean poet, winner of the 1997 Pablo Neruda Award.

== Biography ==
Isabel Gómez Muñoz studied at Escuela Italia No. 18 in Curicó, where she finished her primary education, and then continued with secondary school at Liceo Politécnico A Nº 1, where she obtained a degree in advertising and sales.

Her first literary publications were made in her hometown newspaper La Prensa, and her vocation was also reflected in the founding of the literary workshop Gaviota (1979–1981), which she co-directed. Isabel also participated in the workshops Orlando González Gutiérrez, conducted by the Curican poet Juan Jofré Bustamante; Huelén, by Martín Cerda and Hernán Ortega (1982); and when she was living in Santiago, Espacio, by Osvaldo Ulloa (1990–1991).

She studied pedagogy and received a licentiate in education at the University of Los Lagos, where she completed a master's degree. She has been a librarian at the York School (Peñalolén commune), director of the Chilean Writers' Society, and her poems have been included in various anthologies and published in both national and foreign journals.

== Literary career ==
Gómez Muñoz's first verses were published in La Prensa of Curicó between 1979 and 1983. Three years later her first collection of poems, Un crudo paseo por la sonrisa, appeared in Santiago with a foreword by professor and writer Sergio Bueno Venegas. Then, in 1990, Pubisterio came out, prefaced by José-Christian Páez, with a postface by Jorge Teillier and illustrated with engravings by Mario González Sepúlveda. This book established her as a poet; Teiller highlighted her "acute inner search" illuminated by "the lightning bolts" of intuition, while José Arraño Acevedo wrote that it is "a true spiritual renewal" in the way of approaching feminine poetry, "which seeks to free itself from that which links it to old traditions." In 1994 she published Versos de escalera, and three years later she was honored with the Pablo Neruda Award. Since then she has continued to produce with her customary expressive quality. As Alejandro Lavquén points out, "the handling of the word and its manifestation, expressed in just and precise verses, in images of great beauty and intimacy. Isabel must be one of the poets who best develops her inner self without being unattainable in the understanding of her verses. Her metaphors are light and shadow, just as everyday life is, and by bringing this to the poem, she does so always maintaining the poetic level of the language."

As an anthologist she has compiled El lugar de la memoria (Editorial AYUN, 2007) and Voces de la memoria. Centenario en el bicentenario. Antología de poetas y narradores latinoamericanos en los 100 años del Partido Comunista de Chile (Cuarto Propio, 2012).

== Works ==
- Un crudo paseo por la sonrisa, Ediciones MD, 1986
- Pubisterio, Ediciones Literatura Alternativa, 1990
- Versos de escalera, MD, 1994
- Perfil de muros, with photos by Javier Pérez, Ediciones Logos, 1998
- Boca pálida, Logos, 2003
- Dasein, Editorial Cuarto Propio, 2006
- Enemiga de mí, Cuarto Propio, 2014
