= FONDART =

Coordinates: 33°2′18.48″S 71°37′43.56″W

- Fondo Nacional de Desarrollo Cultural y las Artes
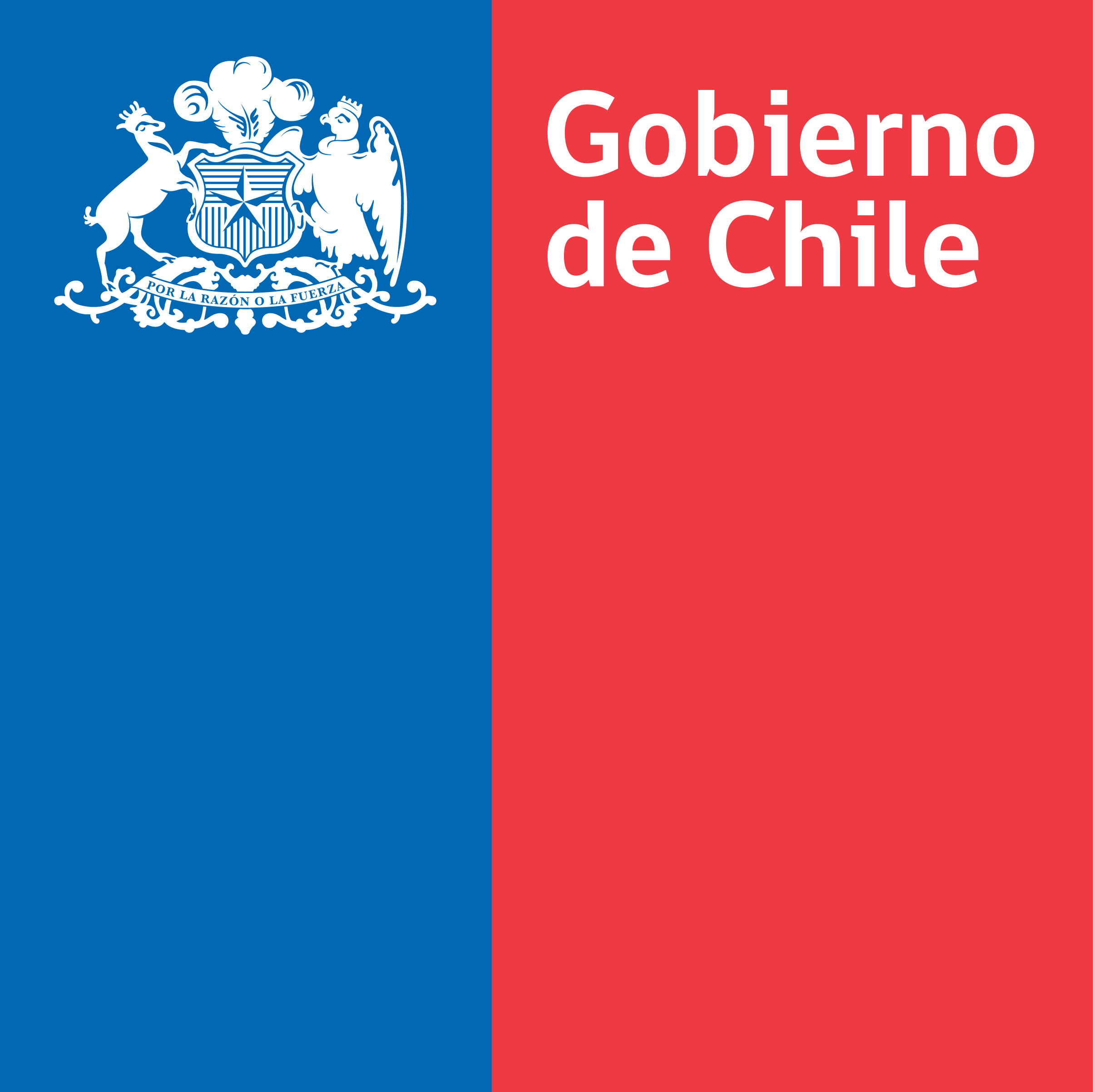

Art and culture sponsorship fund overview
- Jurisdiction: National and Regional
- Headquarters: Sotomayor Square, Valparaíso

FONDART or "Fondo Nacional para el Desarrollo Cultural y las Artes" (English: "National Fund for the Development of Culture and the Arts"), is a Chilean public program of the governmental agency Consejo Nacional de la Cultura y las Artes (English: National Council of Culture and Arts) which provides public funding for projects dedicated to the promotion of arts, culture, and heritage. The Council headquarters are located in Sotomayor Square, Valparaíso.

== Administration ==
FONDART allocates funding through a public bidding system for projects that aim to educate, create, promote and preserve art in the areas of: visual arts, photography, new media, drama, dance, circus arts, craft, design and architecture. Two separate funds are awarded every year, a national fund and a regional fund. The application process, known as called "Ventanilla Abierta" (English: "Open Counter"), is open to any Chilean individual or organisation.

FONDART is managed by the board of Chile’s Consejo Nacional de la Cultura y las Artes (English: National Council for Culture and the Arts), or CNCA, which meets every year to agree the requirements of the competition. The CNCA has a department dedicated to the administration of the fund, the Secretaría de FONDART, which is part of the CNCA’s "Departamento de Fomento de las Artes e Industria Creativa" (Department of Promotion of the Arts and Creative Industries). The Secretaría de FONDART runs the bidding competition for the two funds and pulls together the national and regional results. Each of the artistic areas sponsored by the fund has its own manager overseeing it.

== Legal background ==
FONDART was created in 1992, along with the Consejo Nacional de la Cultura y las Artes under Law Nº 19,891 with the aim of promoting art and culture and conserving Chile’s cultural heritage.

Decree Nº144, of April 4, 2011, established how Law Nº 19,891 would operate and how the national fund for the development of culture and arts would be administered. It replaces the 2004 Decree Nº 65.

Other relevant legal texts

- Law N°19,889 regulates the working and hiring conditions of artists and entertainment technicians.
- Article 8 of Law N°18,985 regulates donations for artistic projects.

== See also ==
- National Council for Culture and the Arts
