= Gay Swim Amsterdam =

Dutch swimming club

Club information
- Full name: Gay Swim Amsterdam
- Short name: GSA
- City: Amsterdam
- Founded: 1997
- Home pool(s): Marnixbad, Sloterparkbad & Sportfondsenbad Amsterdam-Oost

Swimming
- Swim cap design: Orange with the logo in blue and white
- League: KNZB

Gay Swim Amsterdam (GSA) is an Amsterdam-based swimming club primarily catering to gay men, lesbians, bisexuals, transgender people, and other individuals from the queer and LGBTQ+ community. The sports club provides a safe haven where members can participate in sports together without facing prejudice.

== History ==
Gay Swim Amsterdam was founded around 1997. During the 1980s and 1990s, an increasing number of so-called "gay sports clubs" emerged in the Netherlands as a response to the prevailing macho culture and exclusion within the mainstream sports world. The establishment of the club coincided with the preparations for the 1998 Gay Games in Amsterdam, an event that acted as a catalyst for LGBTQ+ sports in the capital and highlighted the importance of an inclusive sports climate.

According to LGBTQ+ media outlets such as the magazine Winq and local Amsterdam platforms like Vrije Tijd Amsterdam, specific sports associations like Gay Swim Amsterdam continue to play a vital role in increasing visibility and providing a safe athletic environment, nearly three decades after their inception.

=== Water polo split ===
The association originally consisted of both a swimming and a water polo department. Until August 2016, the water polo branch competed under the banner of Gay Swim Amsterdam. In the summer of 2016, the water polo department split from the club to form the independent water polo club Amsterdam Waterproof. Since the split, Gay Swim Amsterdam has operated exclusively as a swimming club.

== Social role and events ==
In addition to weekly swim training, Gay Swim Amsterdam is an active participant within the Amsterdam LGBTQ+ community and at related public events.

The association regularly takes part in the Canal Parade during Pride Amsterdam to advocate for diversity in sports. The club participated in the regular Amsterdam Gay Pride in 2014, the large-scale EuroPride in 2016, and in the 2025 edition. Preparations are also underway for WorldPride Amsterdam in 2026.

The ongoing need for a dedicated LGBTQ+ sports club and the necessity of this public visibility is partly driven by a social reality where athletes do not always feel safe. In a 2018 background feature by De Morgen, swimmers and a coach from Gay Swim Amsterdam stated that while the Netherlands offers legal protections, actual acceptance on the streets can still fall short. Members highlighted instances of ongoing street harassment and the frequent necessity to adapt their behavior in public spaces. In this context, the club serves not only as a safe haven to swim freely without fear of homophobia, but also as a platform for the community to remain visible, assertive, and self-aware.

== External link ==
- Official website of Gay Swim Amsterdam
