= Acción Gay =

Chilean LGBTQ organization

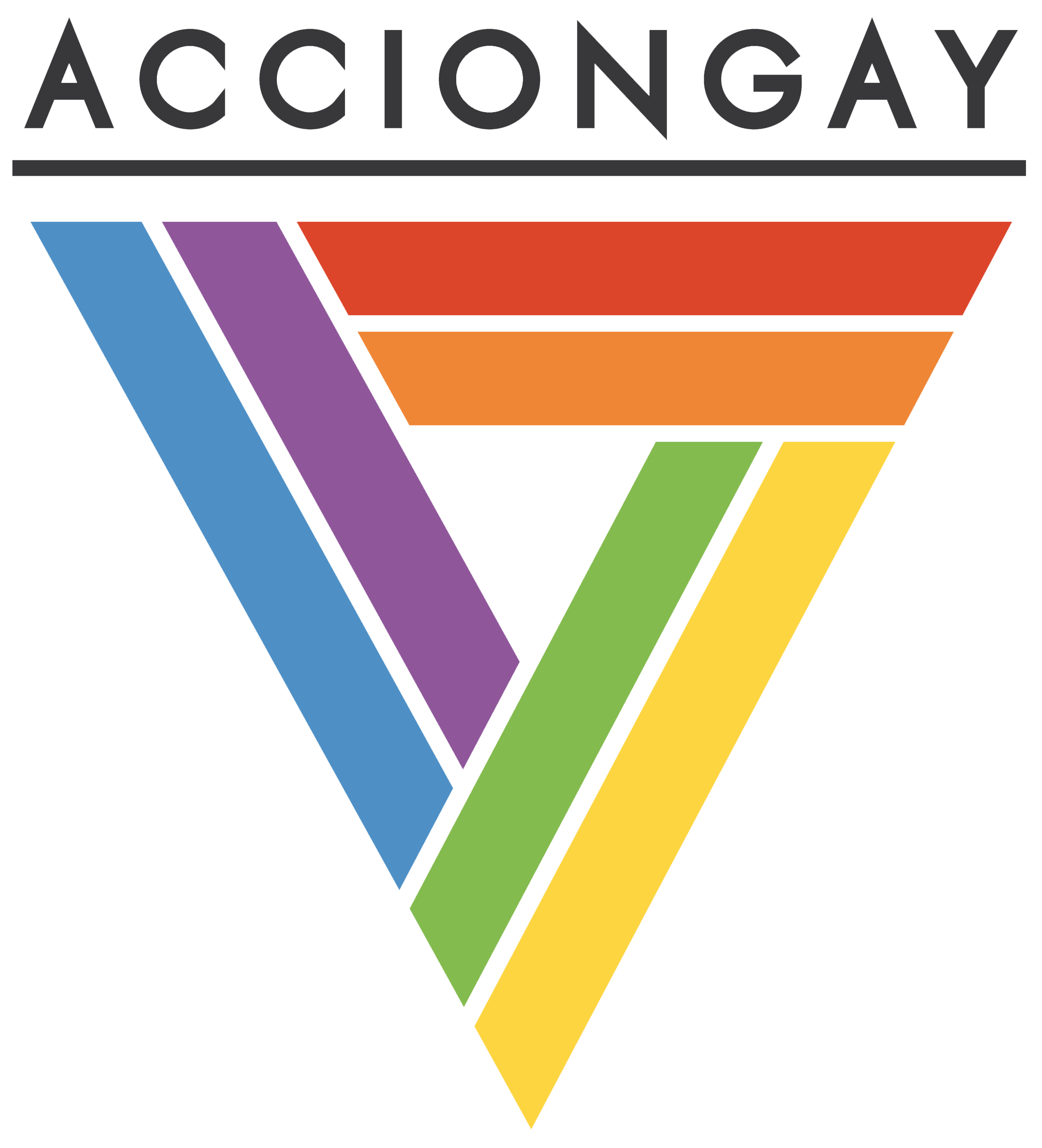
- Formation: July 28, 1987; 39 years ago
- Headquarters: Santiago, Chile
- Leader: Gustavo Hermosilla
- Website: http://www.acciongay.cl/

Acción Gay (stylized as Acciongay, lit. 'Gay Action'; officially Corporación Chilena de Prevención del Sida; lit. 'Chilean Corporation for AIDS Prevention'), formerly Sidacción, is a Chilean organization for the defense of LGBTQ rights.

== History ==
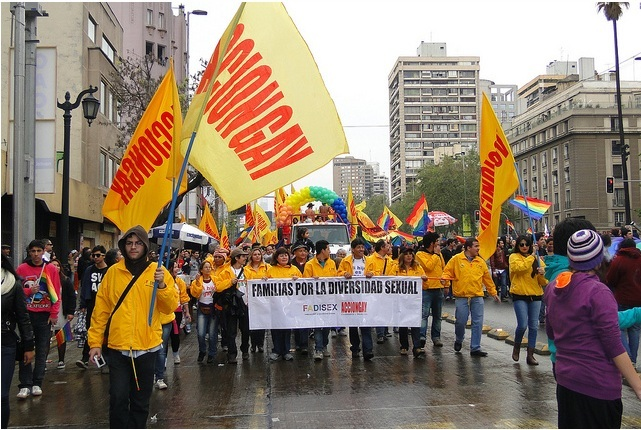
Acción Gay activists at the Santiago Pride March in 2012.

The group was founded on July 28, 1987, by a group of people who sought to raise awareness about HIV/AIDS. This group formed in response to the sensationalist and homophobic information published in the press of the time, in addition to the lack of response to the issue by the authorities of the military dictatorship. Among its founders were Gustavo Hermosilla and Marcos Becerra, and its name was initially "Chilean Corporation against AIDS" (Spanish: Corporación Chilena contra el Sida; CCCS), later becoming "Chilean Corporation for AIDS Prevention" (Spanish: Corporación Chilena de Prevención del Sida; CChPS). Its first headquarters, inaugurated in 1988, was located at Porvenir 464, in the commune of Santiago, later moving to General Jofré 179. The organization obtained legal personality through a decree from the Ministry of Justice on March 7, 1991.

The group was part of the meeting called Lesbian-Homosexual Reflection of South America, held from November 24 to 28, 1992, in the Chilean town of Nos (San Bernardo), and which was the first meeting of LGBTQ groups in South America.

Since 1999, the organization has carried out prevention campaigns with the Ministry of Health on the beaches of the Valparaíso Region during the summer vacation season; this activity has gained notoriety due to the presence of Condonito (lit. 'Little Condom') a corporeal costume representing a condom; That same year, the group's headquarters was created in Valparaíso, being the first one installed outside the Chilean capital.

On June 28, 2003, the group was one of the founding members of the Coordinadora GLTTB, a group of organizations that sought to jointly confront discrimination against LGBTQ people. The other founding groups were the Sindicato Afrodita, the Movimiento por la Diversidad Sexual, Cegal, the Grupo La Pintana, the Colectivo Lésbico Universitario, the Brigada Divine, the Comité de Izquierda por la Diversidad Sexual, the Movimiento Patria Gay, Agrugal, Domos, Afirmación Chile, Traves Chile, the Agrupación Juvenil Chicos Así, and the Agrupación por la Diversidad Sexual de San Bernardo. In 2000, the corporation adopted the name "Sidacción", which in 2007 was replaced by "Acción Gay" (commonly stylized as "ACCIONGAY") as part of a public positioning strategy and to be a more easily pronounced brand.

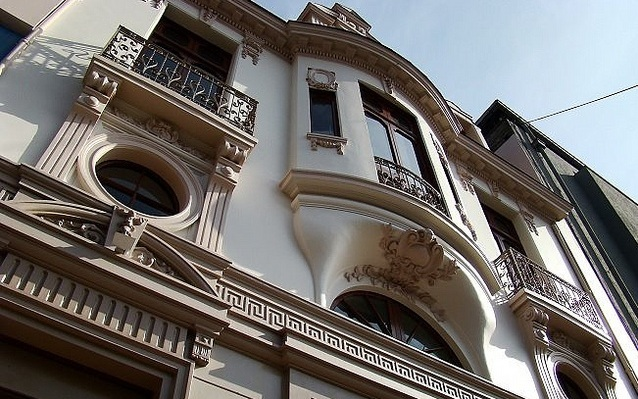
Acción Gay Headquarters since 2009

In August 2007, Acciongay inaugurated the country's first library dedicated primarily to LGBT content at its headquarters. This library was organized around its Documentation Center and the acquisition of publications abroad by its members.

Until 2009, its headquarters were located at Toesca 2315. On June 12 of that same year, they moved to their new premises at San Ignacio 165, in a mansion built in 1913 by Manuel Cifuentes and which is protected as it is within the Typical Zone called "Barrio Dieciocho", declared in 1983. The mansion was restored with the group's own resources since 2008.

In May 2013, it was one of the founding organizations of the Frente de la Diversidad Sexual, along with the Movimiento por la Diversidad Sexual, Todo Mejora, Fundación Iguales, Organización de Transexuales por la Dignidad de la Diversidad, later joining Rompiendo el Silencio, Fundación Daniel Zamudio, Red de Psicólogos de la Diversidad Sexual, Somos Coquimbo, and Mogaleth.

== See also ==
- LGBTQ rights in Chile
