= Santiago Pride March =

LGBTQ event in Santiago, Chile

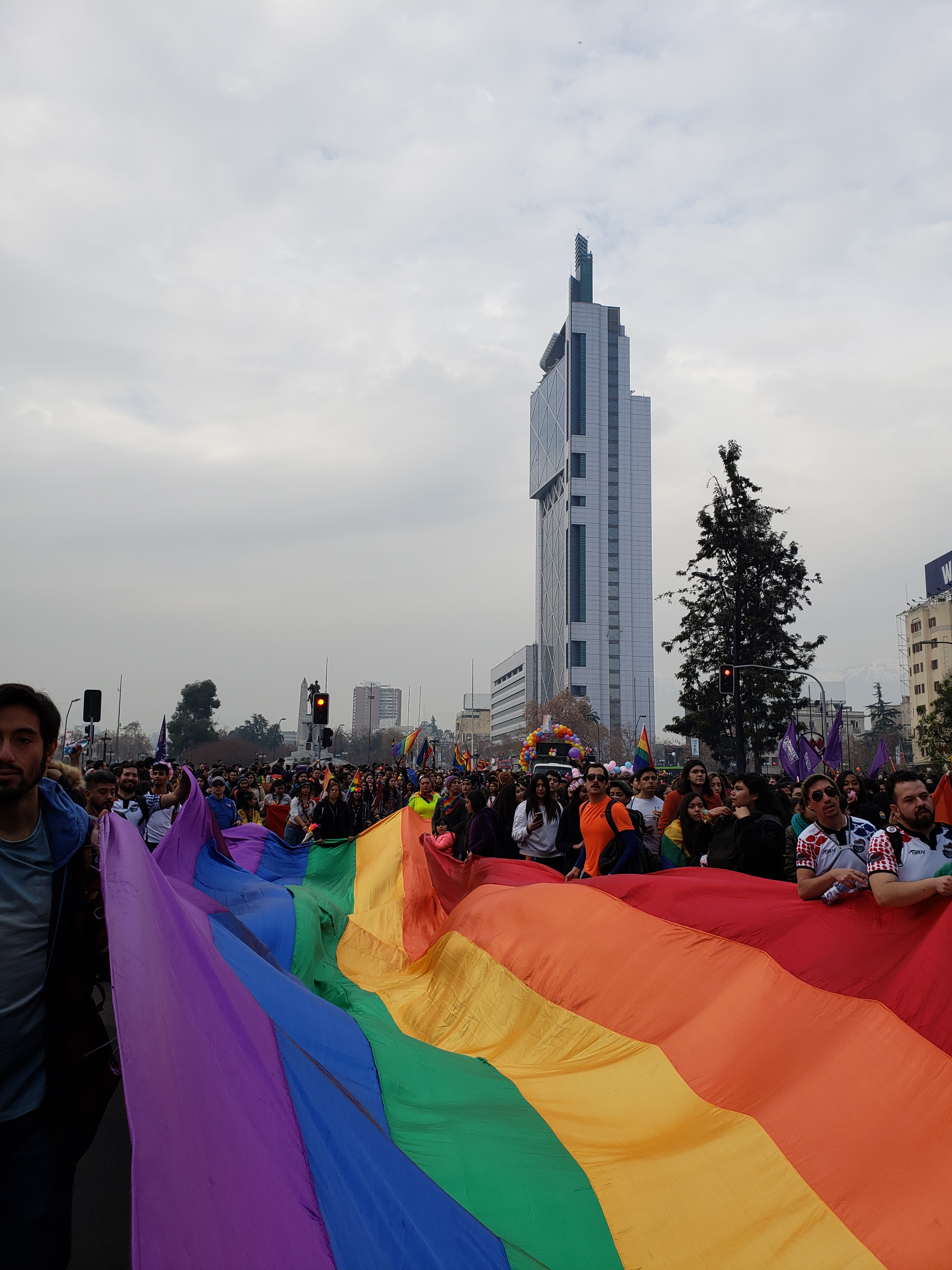
2018 Santiago Pride March in Plaza Baquedano.

The Santiago Pride March is an annual LGBTQ event held in the Santiago, capital of Chile. The Santiago Pride March is considered the third-largest LGBTQ demonstration in support of sexual minorities in Hispanic America, after the Mexico City Pride March and the Buenos Aires Pride March; the 2022 edition was attended by around 80,000 protesters.

== History ==
The history of the Santiago Pride March dates back to June 28, 1997, when the "Umbrella March" (Spanish: Marcha de los paraguas) took place, named in this way as a reference to the Chilean popular saying "umbrella return" (Spanish: vuelta de paraguas) which is used pejoratively to refer to homosexual people. That same day, an event was held at the Cariola Theater, bringing together around 200 people and including performances by drag queens, comedians, and LGBTQ artists.

The first march took place on June 27, 1999, initially only in Santiago and under the name "March for Non-discrimination" (Spanish: Marcha por la No discriminación); then over the years it spread to the cities of Concepción and Valparaíso. The first version of the march brought together around 600 people.

The second march, this time called the "Gay Pride March," (Spanish: Marcha por el Orgullo Gay) took place on September 17, 2000, as part of the "Gay Homeland Month" (Spanish: Mes de la Patria Gay) celebrations, an event created by the United Movement of Sexual Minorities (MUMS) to move the date of LGBTQ pride celebrations in Chile to the traditional month of national holidays. According to the Carabineros (National Police), the number of attendees reached 3,000, while the organizers estimated the figure at 5,000.

The 2004 Santiago Pride March took place on September 25th, preceded by a fair in Bustamante Park. The demonstration was organized by Sidacción and the MUMS, with the support of Afirmación Chile, Amnesty International, Las Otras Familias and Movilh.

In 2005, the Pride March took place on September 24th, reaching a record number of over 8,000 attendees. The Gay and Lesbian School Brigade made its debut on the occasion, and new organizations also joined the march, such as the Sindicato Amanda Jofré, the University Coordinator for Sexual Diversity, the Gay and Lesbian Ecumenical Community, and the Sindicato Afrodita.

The 2007 edition of the Santiago Pride March took place on September 29th, with a route that began in Plaza Baquedano, moving along the Alameda to Paseo Bulnes, and was attended by more than 15,000 people. The lesbian-feminist groups La Perlita, Las Moiras, and the website Rompiendo el Silencio organized a parallel march called "La Otra Marcha" ('The Other March') that followed the same route.

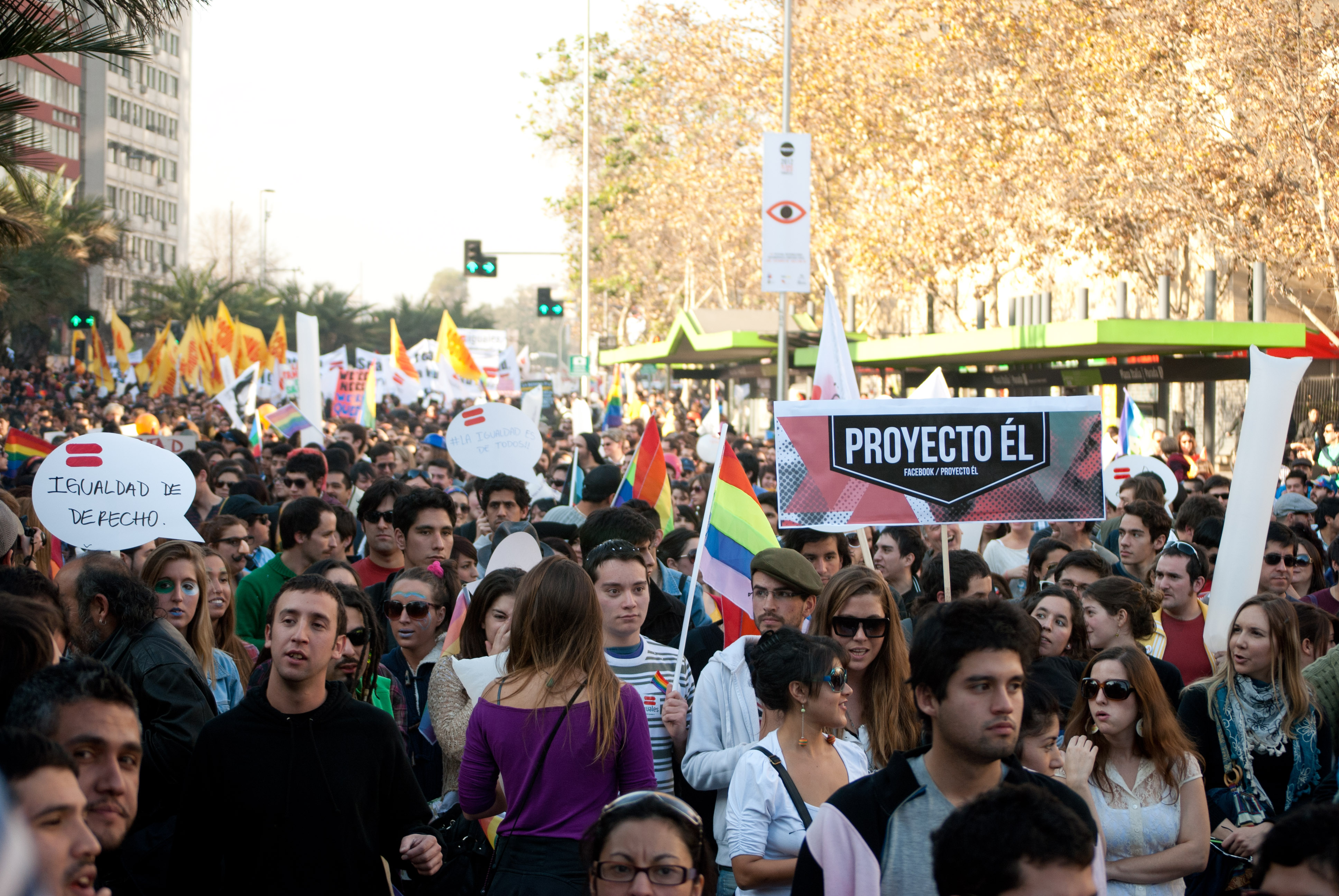
Santiago Pride March 2012.

On September 29, 2012, the 13th version of the then-called "March for Sexual Diversity" (Spanish: Marcha por la Diversidad Sexual) was held with the highest turnout to date, following the murder of the young gay man Daniel Zamudio, which caused international commotion and led to the enactment of the Anti-Discrimination Law by the government of Sebastián Piñera.

Due to the COVID-19 pandemic, the Pride March in Chile was held virtually for the first time in 2020, through video presentations on the Movilh YouTube channel. The following year, the group announced on October 8 that the Pride March would be held again in person on November 13 at Plaza Baquedano. On that occasion, more than 150 thousand people attended and it was attended by Elisa Loncon, president of the Constitutional Convention, in addition to the constitutional convention members Pedro Muñoz Leiva, Gaspar Domínguez, Bessy Gallardo and Tomás Laibe, and the mayor of Melipilla, Lorena Olavarría, the first openly sexually diverse communal authority elected in the country.

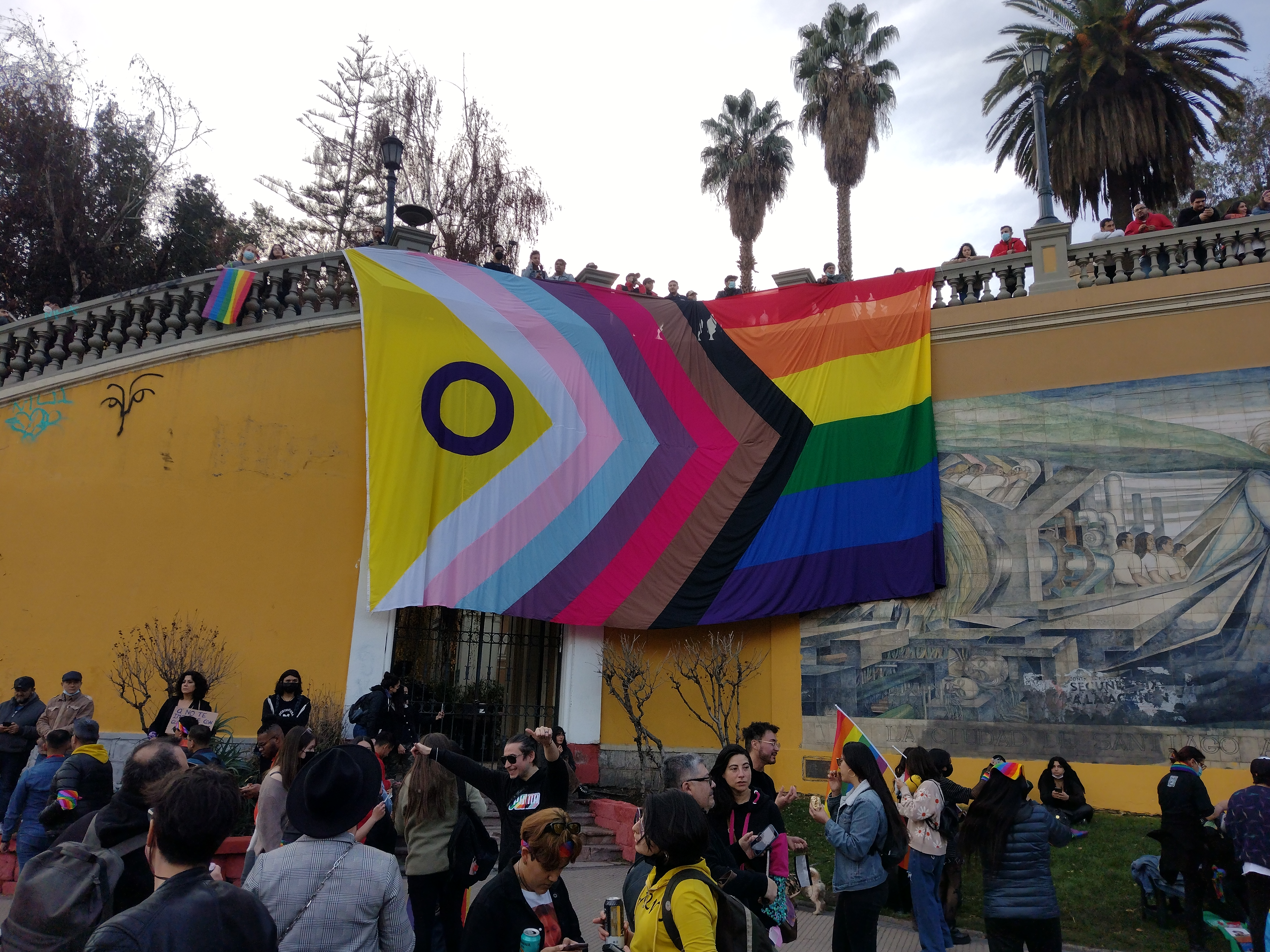
LGBTQ pride flag displayed on Santa Lucía Hill during the 2022 Pride March.

The 2022 Pride March took place on June 25th, organized for the first time jointly by Movilh and the Fundación Iguales. During the event's preparations, the organizers stated that no for-profit entities would be allowed to promote their brand, stating that "it is a social protest march and not a commercial event". The 2023 edition of the Santiago Pride March took place on June 24, and was once again organized jointly by Movilh and the Fundación Iguales.

== Counter-hegemonic Bloc ==
Also known as the "Dissident Action Bloc," the Counterhegemonic March in Santiago is a mobilization that seeks to challenge power structures and established social norms generally associated with sexual and gender diversity. In 2022, for example, a counterhegemonic bloc convened at the Pride March to express demands beyond the legalization of same-sex marriage, emphasizing the need to transform social structures. Participating organizations include groups such as Aces, Marcha Disidente, Pan y Rosas, Frente TransMasculinidades, Red Lesbo Feminista, MemoriaxBau, Intersexuales Chile, Guerrilla Marika, and Banda Exuberante, Disidencias en Lucha, among others.

The organizations convening this counter-hegemonic bloc declare that they agree with the points raised by Movilh and Iguales; however, they point out that "these organizations' priorities focus on aspects that seem to benefit only those who enjoy class privilege and leave aside many other important points".

== See also ==
- LGBTQ people in Chile
- LGBTQ history in Chile
- LGBTQ rights in Chile
