= List of largest LGBTQ events =

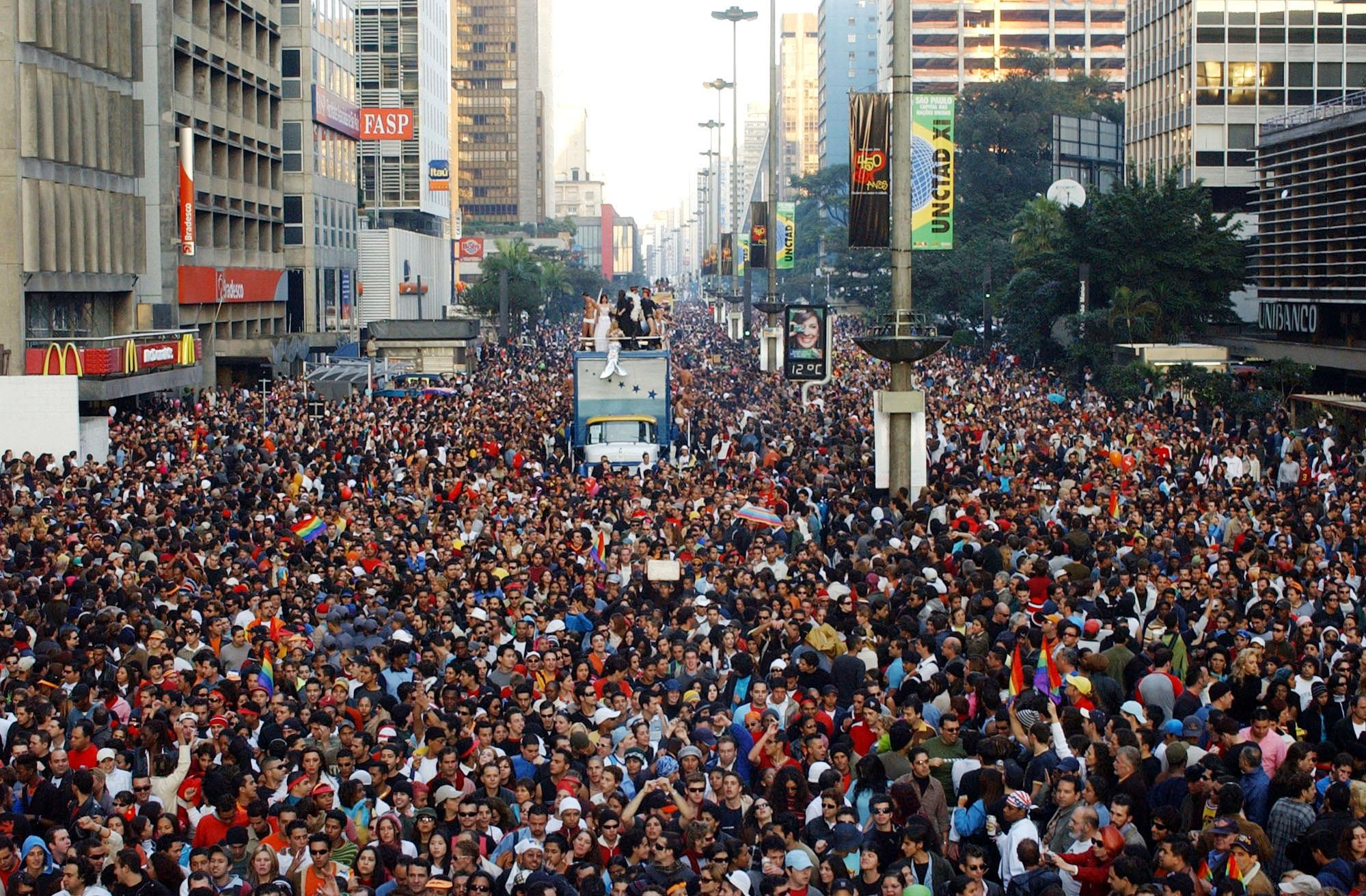
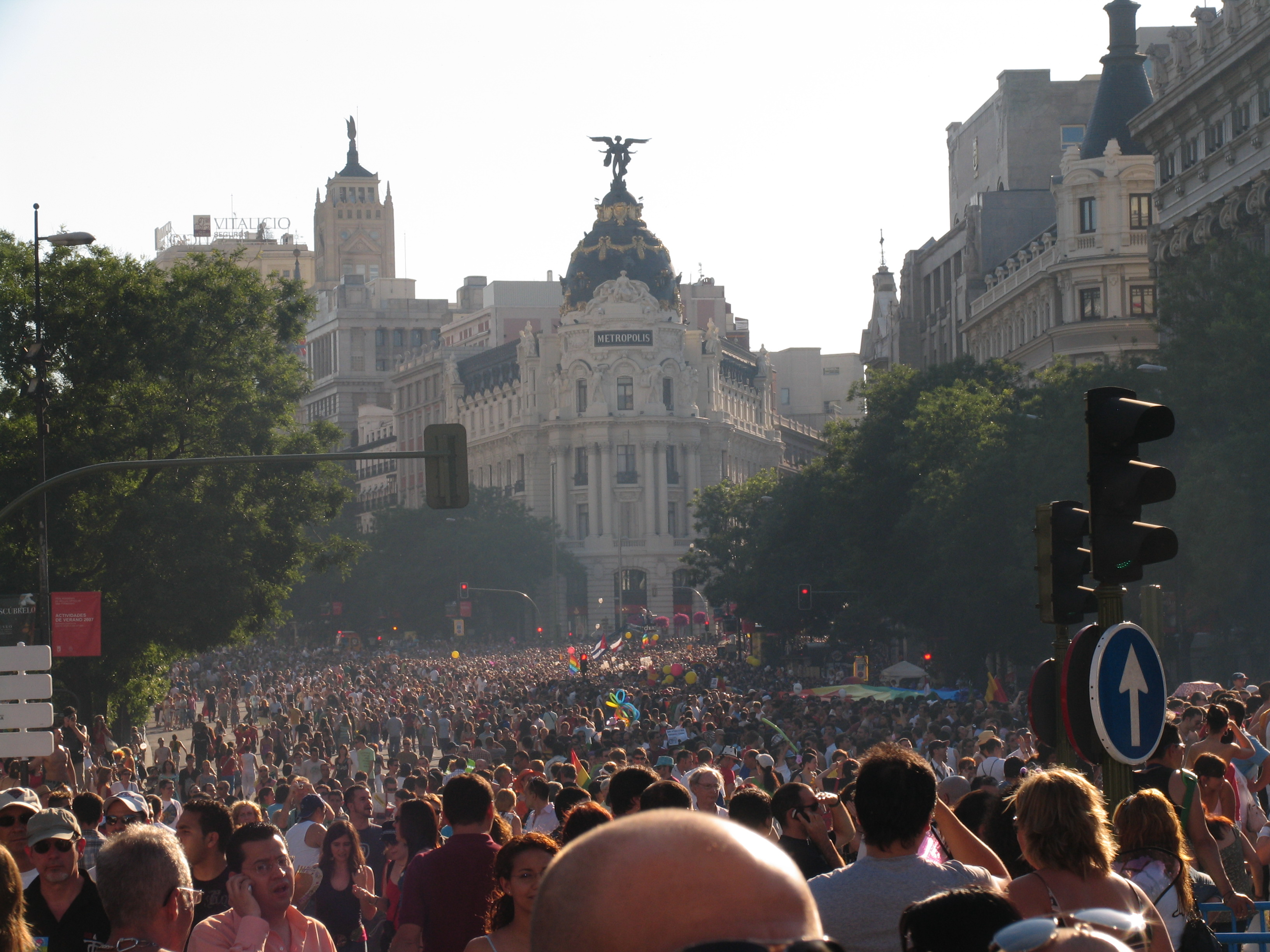
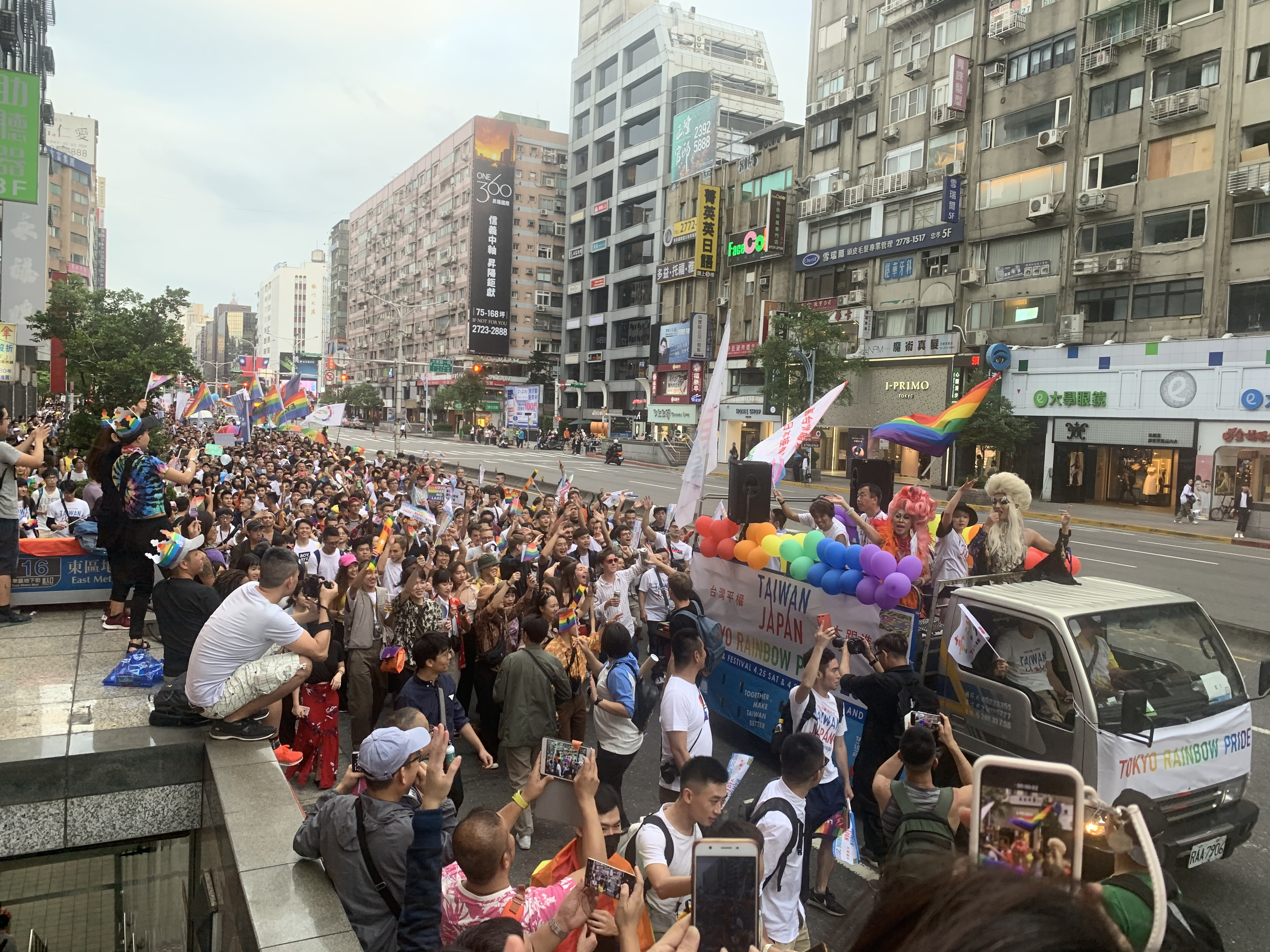
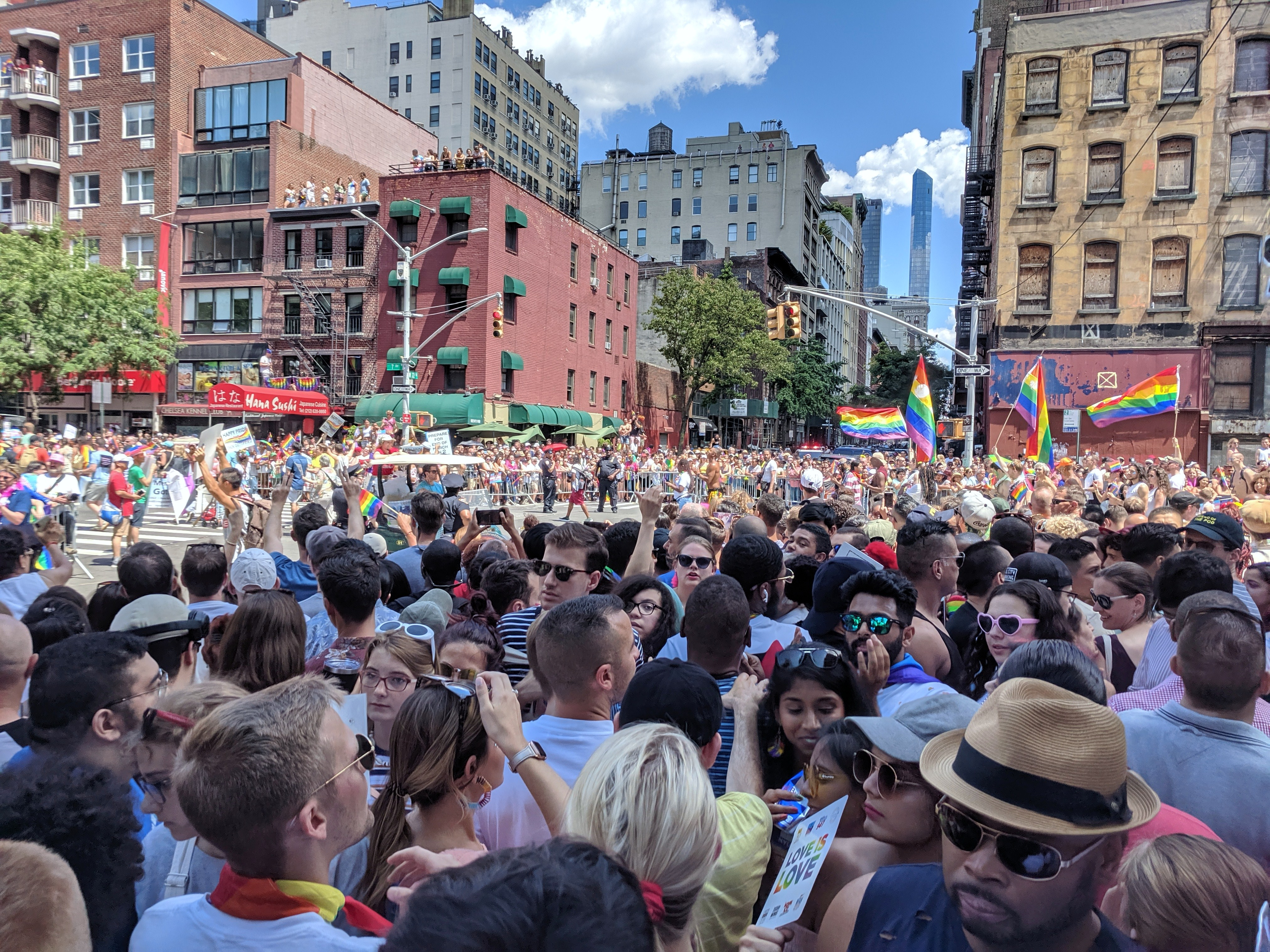
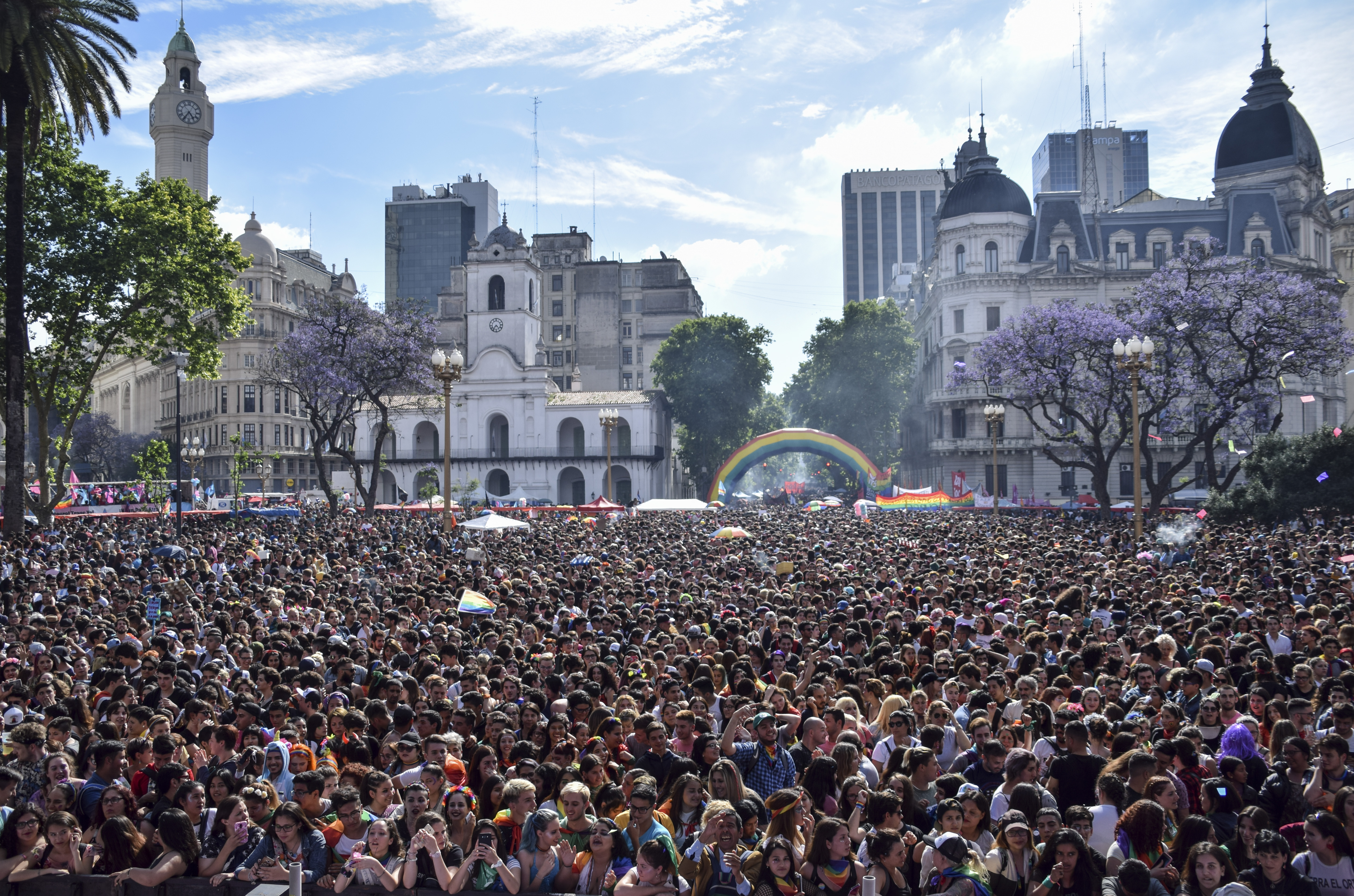
- São Paulo Madrid Taipei Manhattan Buenos Aires

The list presents the largest LGBTQ events (pride parades and festivals) worldwide by attendance. Statistics are announced both by the organizers and authorities (police). In this table, the largest single event by city as well as notable international events such as WorldPride or Europride are indicated. Only referenced statistics are accepted. National parades are generally further supported by nationwide LGBTQ associations and media organizations. Certain statistics may include celebrations or festivals that may be exclusive of the parade. They are typically held in late June, in commemoration of the 1969 Stonewall riots in Lower Manhattan.

The NYC Pride March in New York City, considered an epicenter of the global LGBTQ sociopolitical ecosystem, is consistently North America's biggest pride parade, with 2.1 million attendees in 2015 and 2.5 million in 2016; in 2018, and again in 2023, attendance was estimated around two million, increasing back up to 2.5 million in 2024. During Stonewall 50 – WorldPride NYC 2019 in Manhattan, over 5 million took part over the final weekend, with an estimated four million in attendance at the parade. While NYC Pride still has the largest Pride March, since 2023 Pride Toronto has had the largest Pride Festival in North America with 2.9 million attendees in 2023 and 3.1 million in 2024.

The São Paulo Gay Pride Parade in Brazil is South America's largest event, and was listed by Guinness World Records as the world's largest Pride parade in 2006 with 2.5 million people. It broke the Guinness record in 2009 with four million attendees, with similar numbers to at least 2016, and up to five million attending in 2017. As of 2019, it had three to five million each year. There are Pride parades held as well in Argentina and Chile.

Pride Toronto is the largest pride event in North America (and Canada) while NYC Pride is the largest Pride event in the United States, with Mexico City Pride as the largest Pride event in Mexico. In Asia, Taiwan Pride, Tokyo Rainbow Pride in Japan and Tel Aviv Pride in Israel are Asia's largest pride events. In Oceania, Sydney Gay and Lesbian Mardi Gras in Australia is Oceania's largest Pride event. The March of Pride (Buenos Aires) is the largest Pride event in Argentina while São Paulo Gay Pride Parade is the largest Pride event in Brazil, with Santiago Pride as the largest Pride event in Chile. Paris Pride is the largest Pride event in France while Copenhagen Pride is the largest Pride event in Denmark, with Helsinki Pride as the largest Pride event in Finland.

As of June 2019, the largest LGBTQ events in other parts of the world included:

- in Europe: Madrid Pride, Orgullo Gay de Madrid (MADO), with 3.5 million attendees when it hosted WorldPride in 2017;
- in Asia: Taiwan Pride in Taipei;
- in the Middle East: Tel Aviv Pride in Israel;
- in Oceania: Sydney Mardi Gras Parade in Australia;
- in Africa: Johannesburg Pride in South Africa

Brooklyn Liberation March, the largest transgender rights demonstration in LGBTQ history, took place on June 14, 2020, stretching from Grand Army Plaza to Fort Greene, Brooklyn in New York City, and focused on supporting Black transgender lives, drawing an estimated 15,000 to 20,000 participants.

== All-time statistics ==
Rank	City	Support	Year	Organizers' statistics	Authorities' statistics	Type
1	(United States) New York City	WorldPride	2019	4,000,000	5,000,000	March/Festival
2	(Brazil) São Paulo	Local	2011	4,000,000		Parade
3	(Spain) Madrid	WorldPride	2017	3,500,000	2,300,000	Festival
4	(Canada) Toronto	Local	2024	3,100,000		March/Festival
5	(Canada) Toronto	Local	2023	2,900,000		March/Festival
6	(United States) New York City	Local	2024	2,500,000		March
7	(Canada) Toronto	Local	2022	2,400,000		March/Festival
8	(Spain) Madrid	EuroPride	2007	2,300,000		Festival
9	(United States) New York City	Local	2016	2,100,000+	2,500,000	March
10 (tie)	(Argentina) Buenos Aires	Local	2023		2,000,000	March
10 (tie)	(United States) New York City	Local	2023	2,000,000		March
10 (tie)	(United States) New York City	Local	2018	2,000,000		March
13 (tie)	(Canada) Toronto	Local	2019	1,700,000		March/Festival
13 (tie)	(United States) San Francisco	Local	2014	1,700,000		Parade/Festival
13 (tie)	(United States) San Francisco	Local	2019	1,700,000		Parade/Festival
16	(Spain) Madrid	Local	2019	1,600,000		Parade
17 (tie)	(Spain) Madrid	Local	2016	1,500,000		Parade
17 (tie)	(United Kingdom) London	National	2019	1,500,000+		Parade
19 (tie)	(Germany) Cologne	EuroPride	2002	1,400,000		Parade
19 (tie)	(Germany) Cologne	Local	2023		1,400,000	Parade/Festival
21	(Canada) Toronto	Local	2012		1,220,000	Festival
22 (tie)	(Germany) Cologne	Local	2022	1,200,000		Festival
22 (tie)	(Germany) Cologne	Local	2019	1,200,000		Parade
22 (tie)	(Germany) Cologne	Local	2018	1,200,000		Parade
22 (tie)	(Spain) Madrid	National	2012	1,200,000	700,000	Parade
26	(United States) Chicago	Local	2016		1,000,000+	Parade
27	(United States) San Francisco	Local	2015	1,000,000+		Parade/Festival
28	(Germany) Berlin	National	2012		1,000,000	Parade
29	(Germany) Cologne	Local	2013	1,000,000	900,000	Parade
30	(Italy) Rome	EuroPride	2011	1,000,000		Festival
31	(Canada) Montreal	Local	2025	900,000		Parade/Festival
32	(France) Paris	National	2010	800,000	100,000	Parade
33	(United States) Houston	Local	2017	750,000		Parade
34	(United Kingdom) London	Local	2014	750,000		Parade
35	(United States) Boston	Local	2019	750,000		Parade
36	(Brazil) Rio de Janeiro	Local	2011	700,000		Parade
37	(Netherlands) Amsterdam	Local	2014	560,000	450,000	Parade
38	(United States) Denver	Local	2019	525,000		Parade & Festival
39	(United States) Columbus	Local	2019	750,000		Parade and Festival
40	(Argentina) Buenos Aires	National	2019	500,000		Parade
41	(Brazil) Rio de Janeiro	Local	2010		500,000	Parade
42	Mexico City	National	2010	500,000		Parade
43	(United Kingdom) Brighton	Local	2018	450,000	450,000	Parade & Festival
44 (tie)	(United States) Philadelphia	Local	2022	400,000		Parade, Festival, and Parties
44 (tie)	(United States) Los Angeles	Local	2015	400,000		Parade
44 (tie)	(United States) Minneapolis	Local	2016	400,000		Festival
47	(United States) San Diego	Local	2019	360,000		Parade/Festival
48	(Germany) Berlin	Local	2022		350,000	Parade/Festival
49 (tie)	Quezon City, Philippines	Local	2026	300,000		Parade/Festival
49 (tie)	(United States) Atlanta	Local	2018	300,000		Parade & Festival
49 (tie)	(Australia) Sydney	Local	2020	300,000; Largest: 500,000 (1993)		Parade
52	(Canada) Montreal	Local	2012	290,000		Parade
53	(Australia) Melbourne	Local	2020	261,806	264,895	Parade & Festival
54	(Israel) Tel Aviv	Local	2019	250,000		Parade & Festival
55	(United States) St. Petersburg	Local	2019	265,000		Parade & Festival
56	(Italy) Rome	WorldPride	2000	250,000		Parade
57	(United States) New Orleans	Local	2019	250,000		Parade & Festival
58	(Israel) Tel Aviv	Local	2018	250,000		Parade
59	(Belgium) Brussels	Local	2025	220,000		Parade & Festival
60	(Belgium) Brussels	Local	2026	216,000		Parade & Festival
61	(United States) Charlotte	Local	2019	200,000		Parade & Festival
62	(Brazil) Belo Horizonte	Local	2019	200,000	200,000	Parade
63	(Argentina) Buenos Aires	National	2012	200,000		Parade
64	(Austria) Vienna	National	2023	300,000		Parade
65	(Japan) Tokyo	Local	2019	200,000		Parade & Festival
66	(Taiwan) Taipei	National	2019	200,000		Parade
67	(Hungary) Budapest	Local	2025	470,000		Parade
68	(United States) Los Angeles	Local	2024	190,000		Parade & Festival
69	(United States) Miami	Local	2018		180,000	Parade & Festival
70	(Germany) Hamburg	Local	2018	180,000		Parade
71	(Germany) Munich	Local	2018		160,000	Parade
72	(Italy) Palermo	National	2013	150,000	135,000	Parade
73	(Belgium) Brussels	Local	2023	150,000	100,000	Parade & Festival
74	(Canada) Ottawa	Local	2019	125,000		Festival
75	(Denmark) Copenhagen	Local	2014	120,000		Parade
76	(South Korea) Seoul	National	2018	120,000		Parade & Festival
77	(Belgium) Brussels	National	2022	120,000		Parade & Festival
78	(Philippines) Quezon City	Local	2023	110,752	110,752	Festival
79	(United Kingdom) London	Local (trans specific)	2025	100,000+		March
80	(Chile) Santiago	Local	2021	100,000		March
80	(Finland) Helsinki	Local	2022	100,000		March

== See also ==
- List of LGBTQ events
- List of LGBTQ awareness periods
