= WorldPride =

International LGBTQ Pride celebration and parade

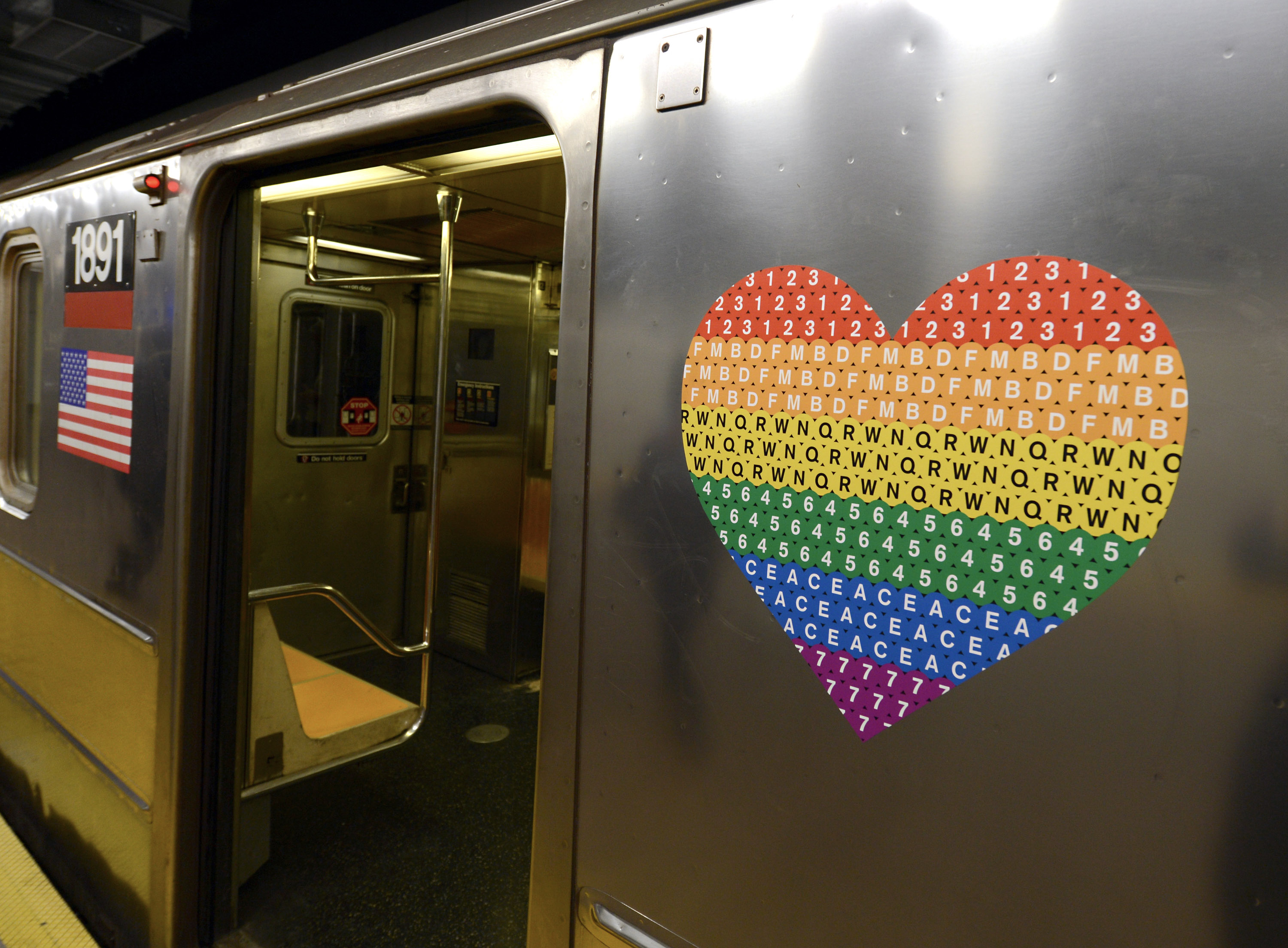
- The MTA Pride logo on a New York City Subway car of the (1) train. Representing LGBTQ pride, its heart-shaped rainbow design was introduced to celebrate Stonewall 50 - WorldPride NYC 2019 which brought about five million attendants to Manhattan, becoming the largest LGBTQ event in history.
- Frequency: Bi-annually
- Inaugurated: July 1–9, 2000 in Rome, Italy
- Previous event: July 25 – August 8, 2026 in Amsterdam, The Netherlands
- Next event: September 30 – October 14, 2028 in Cape Town, South Africa
- Organizer: InterPride

WorldPride is a series of international LGBT pride events coordinated by InterPride; they are hosted in conjunction with local LGBT pride festivals, with host cities selected via bids voted on during InterPride's annual general meetings. Its core events include opening and closing ceremonies, a pride parade (which may either be the host city's existing pride parade, or a bespoke event organized specifically for WorldPride), and an LGBT human rights conference.

The inaugural WorldPride was held in Rome in 2000. In 2019, it was estimated that Sydney Gay and Lesbian Mardi Gras—host of WorldPride 2023—would have a 25–40% increase in attendance over normal years, and contribute over AU$664 million to the local economy. Due to its scale and the bidding process, WorldPride was colloquially referred to as "the gay Olympics" by Australian media outlets.

== History ==
=== WorldPride Rome 2000 ===
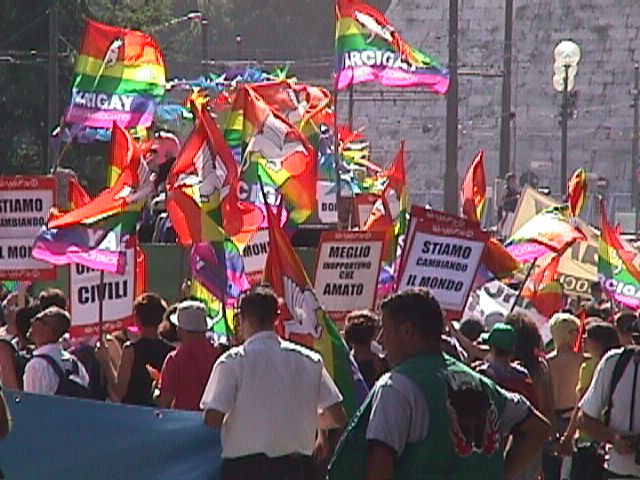
Image from the first WorldPride, held in Rome on July 8, 2000

At the 16th annual conference of InterPride, held in October 1997 in New York City, InterPride's membership voted to establish the "WorldPride" title and awarded it to the city of Rome, Italy, during July 1 to July 9, 2000. The event was put on by the Italian gay rights group Mario Mieli along with InterPride.

Rome officials had promised to put up US$200,000 for the event, however bowing to ferocious opposition from the Vatican and conservative politicians, Rome's leftist mayor, Francesco Rutelli, on May 30, 2000 withdrew logistical and monetary support. Hours after his announcement, Rutelli mostly reversed himself in response to harsh criticism from the left. He restored the funding and promised to help with permits, but declined to back down on a demand that organizers remove the city logo from promotional materials. The event was staunchly opposed by Pope John Paul II and seen as an infringement on the numerous Catholic pilgrims visiting Rome for the Catholic Church's Great Jubilee. Pope John Paul II addressed crowds in St. Peter's Square during WorldPride 2000 stating, in regards to the event, that it was an "offence to the Christian values of a city that is so dear to the hearts of Catholics across the world."

The organisers claimed 250,000 people joined in the march to the Colosseum and the Circus Maximus, two of Rome's most famous ancient sites. It was one of the biggest crowds to gather in Rome for decades. Among the scheduled events were conferences, a fashion show, a large parade, a leather dance, and a concert featuring Gloria Gaynor, The Village People, RuPaul, and Geri Halliwell.

=== WorldPride Jerusalem 2006 ===
The 22nd annual conference of InterPride, held in October 2003 in Montreal, Quebec, Canada, with over 150 delegates from 51 cities from around the world in attendance, voted to accept the bid of the Jerusalem Open House to host WorldPride 2006 in the Holy City.

The first attempt to hold WorldPride in Jerusalem was in 2005, however it was postponed until 2006 because of tensions arising from Israel's withdrawal from the Gaza Strip. It was called “Love Without Borders” as a nod to the many barriers within Israel, and for gays and lesbians in other ways. World Pride was a key project of Jerusalem's Open House, the city's gay community centre.

After Jerusalem was selected as the WorldPride 2006 City, the city of Tel Aviv announced that it was cancelling its own annual Pride Weekend in 2006 to make sure that more Israelis attended the main march. As WorldPride started in 2006, the main parade was scheduled for August 6, but was strongly opposed by Israeli religious Orthodox Jews, Muslims and Christian leaders from the outset. However, due to the 2006 Israel-Lebanon conflict, Jerusalem's government cancelled the march, saying there were not enough soldiers to protect marchers. A week of events took place as scheduled and included five conferences, a film festival, exhibitions, and literary and political events. The parade was cancelled but the Jerusalem Open House announced that it would hold a parade on November 10 after reaching an agreement with the police and the municipality.

=== WorldPride London 2012 ===
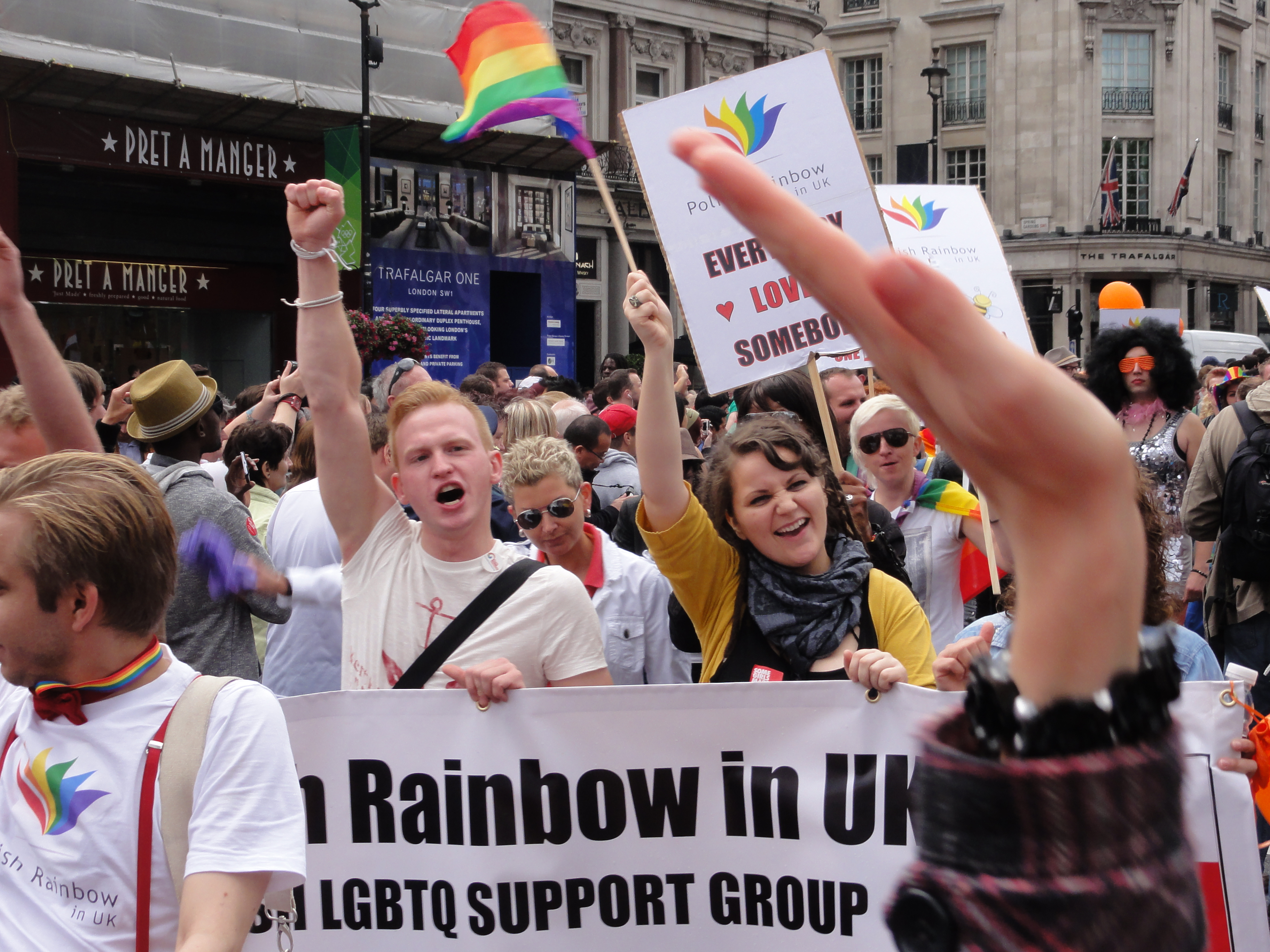
LGBTQ support group, Polish Rainbow, marching at WorldPride London 2012

The 27th annual conference of InterPride, held in October 2008 in Vancouver, Canada, voted for the bid from Pride London, over Stockholm Pride, to host WorldPride 2012 in the capital of the United Kingdom just ahead of the London Olympic and Paralympic Games and during the anticipated year-long celebrations of Queen Elizabeth II's Diamond Jubilee. Pride London planned a parade with floats, a large performance area in Trafalgar Square with street parties in Golden Square and Soho. However, London's World Pride event was significantly "scaled back" at an emergency all-agencies meeting on June 27, 2012, nine days before the event was due to take place and after the festival fortnight had started. Pride London organisers had failed to secure the funds necessary for contractors of key areas of the work, and they announced that all activities were being cut or cancelled. The London Evening Standard reported that four contractors from the previous year's Pride event were owed £65,000 in unpaid debts, though this has been denied by Pride London. Consequently, the entertainment and stages were all cut, and licence applications for street parties in Soho withdrawn. Instead, the event plans included a Pride Walk (without floats or vehicles), and a scaled-back rally in Trafalgar Square. On July 5, the Metropolitan Police issued a licence regulations notice to all venues in Soho, reminding them that Pride London had no licence for street events in the Soho area, and therefore venues should treat WorldPride as "any normal day".

Part of the Pride Walk going past Trafalgar Square, London in 2012

Peter Tatchell and former Pride London Associate Director James-J Walsh in an article for PinkNews criticised the management of Pride London's management of World Pride. Tatchell said "Whatever the rights and wrongs, this scaling down of WorldPride is a huge embarrassment for London and for our LGBT community. We promised LGBT people world-wide a fabulous, spectacular event. It now looks like WorldPride in London will go down in history as a damp squib. We're not only letting down LGBT people in Britain, we're also betraying the trust and confidence of LGBT people world-wide. This is an absolute disaster." Walsh added "This will mar the work of Pride London for years to come. Pride London has lost the focus of being an LGBT campaigning organisation, instead focusing on partying rather than politics, which is what the community needs when legislation around equal marriage and LGBT rights are still to be won both in the UK and around the world."

Following community pressure, Pride London, a registered charity since 2004, withdrew from organising future Pride events in London. In December 2012 the Mayor of London's Office awarded the contract to Pride in London.

=== WorldPride Toronto 2014 ===
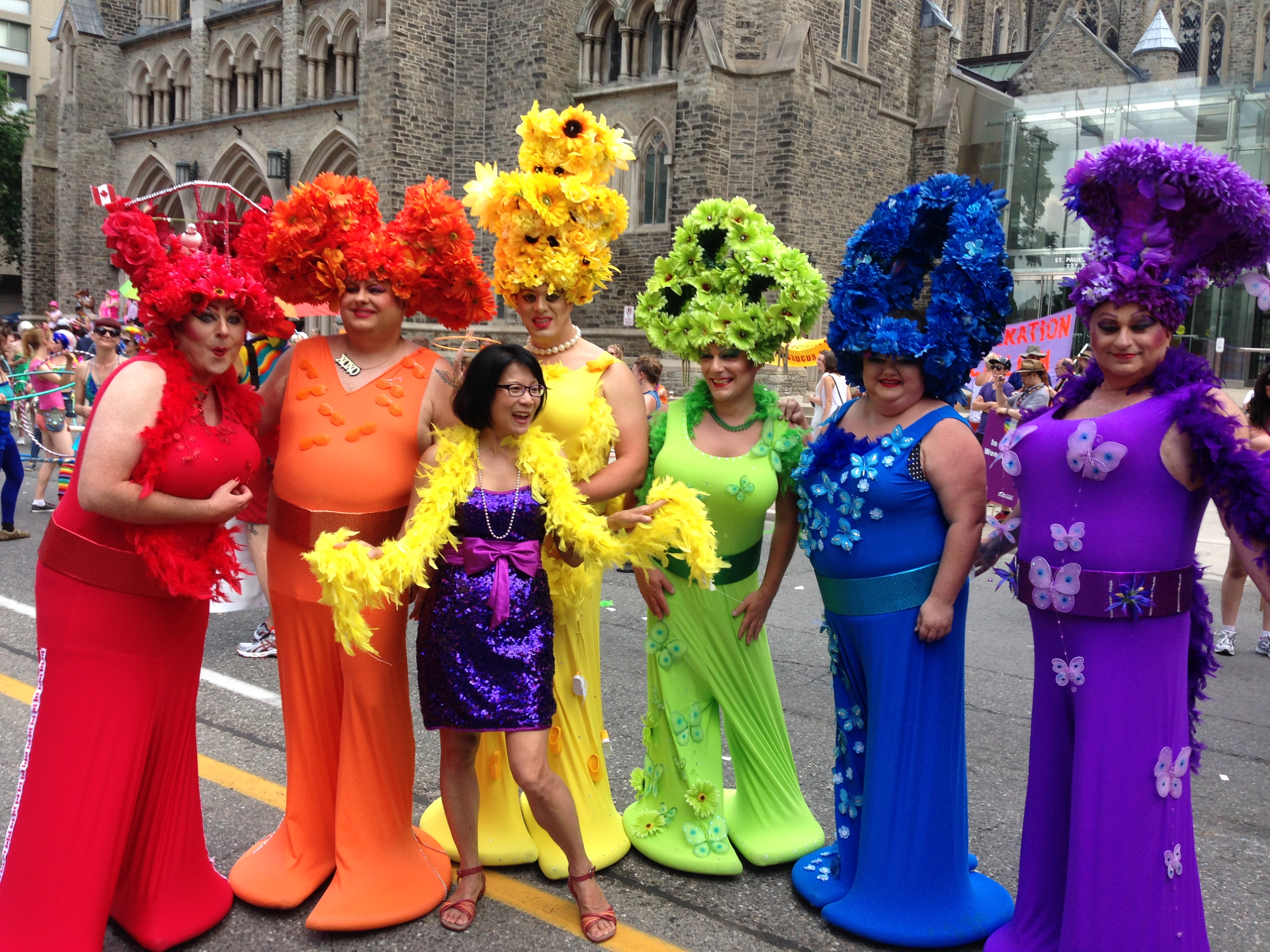
Olivia Chow during Pride Toronto 2014, host of WorldPride 2014

Pride Toronto, in partnership with the city's tourism agency, Tourism Toronto, submitted a bid to host WorldPride 2014 in Toronto, Ontario, Canada from June 20 to June 29, 2014. The 28th annual conference of InterPride, held in October 2009 in St. Petersburg, Florida, United States, voted to accept the bid of Pride Toronto to host WorldPride 2014 for the first time in North America. In the first round of voting Toronto won 77 votes to Stockholm's 61. In the second round of voting Stockholm was eliminated and Toronto won 78% of the vote, fulfilling the 2/3 majority needed to finalize the selection process.

WorldPride 2014 festivities included an opening ceremony at Nathan Phillips Square featuring concert performances by Melissa Etheridge, Deborah Cox, Steve Grand and Tom Robinson, an international human rights conference whose attendees included Jóhanna Sigurðardóttir, Frank Mugisha and Edie Windsor amongst 2,400 attendees and 195 presenters from around the world, a gala and awards event, a variety of networking and social events including Canada Day and American Independence Day celebrations and an exhibition commemorating the 45th anniversary of the Stonewall Riots. Three marches occurred over the last three days of the ten-day celebration: the Trans march, the Dyke march, and the WorldPride Parade. Of these marches, the Trans and Dyke marches were more political, while the WorldPride Parade was more celebratory and included floats, musical acts, and dancers. All three marches were the longest of their kind in Canadian history. Over 12,000 people registered to march in the WorldPride parade and over 280 floats took part in the march. The parade lasted over five hours, marking it as one of the longest parades in Toronto's history. The parade's grand marshal was Brent Hawkes, the pastor of the Metropolitan Community Church of Toronto, and Georgian activist Anna Rekhviashvili served as international grand marshal.

There were many free public stages throughout Toronto's Church and Wellesley neighbourhood, featuring drag queen and king shows, burlesque shows, cultural performances, and musical acts including Carly Rae Jepsen, Peaches, Against Me!, Hercules and Love Affair, Chely Wright, Pansy Division, Lydia Lunch, The Nylons, k.d. lang, Carole Pope, Parachute Club, Dragonette and The Cliks. PFLAG sponsored a Pride flag, mounted on a flagpole atop the Churchmouse and Firkin pub, which automatically raised or lowered itself based on the volume of positive or negative commentary about LGBT issues on Twitter, and promoted the hashtag #raisethepride to attendees wishing to help raise the flag.

The event's slogan was "Rise Up". Parachute Club, whose 1983 single "Rise Up" has long been considered a Canadian gay anthem, released a contemporary remix of the song a week before the festivities.

The closing ceremony, held at Yonge-Dundas Square (now Sankofa Square) following the parade, featured performances by Tegan and Sara, Robin S, CeCe Peniston, Rich Aucoin, God-Des and She and Hunter Valentine.

When estimating the potential economic impact of WorldPride for Toronto, Pride Toronto officials said that Pride Week 2009 drew an estimated one million people to Toronto and contributed C$136 million to the city's economy, and stated that they expected WorldPride's impact to be about five times bigger. Results showed that WorldPride brought in C$791 million, nearly six times the 2009 figure.

=== WorldPride Madrid 2017 ===
In October 2012, InterPride's membership voted at its annual conference in Boston, Massachusetts, United States, to award WorldPride 2017 to the city of Madrid, Spain. The other candidate cities to host the event in 2017 were Berlin and Sydney, but Madrid won unanimously in the voting of more than 80 delegations from around the world.

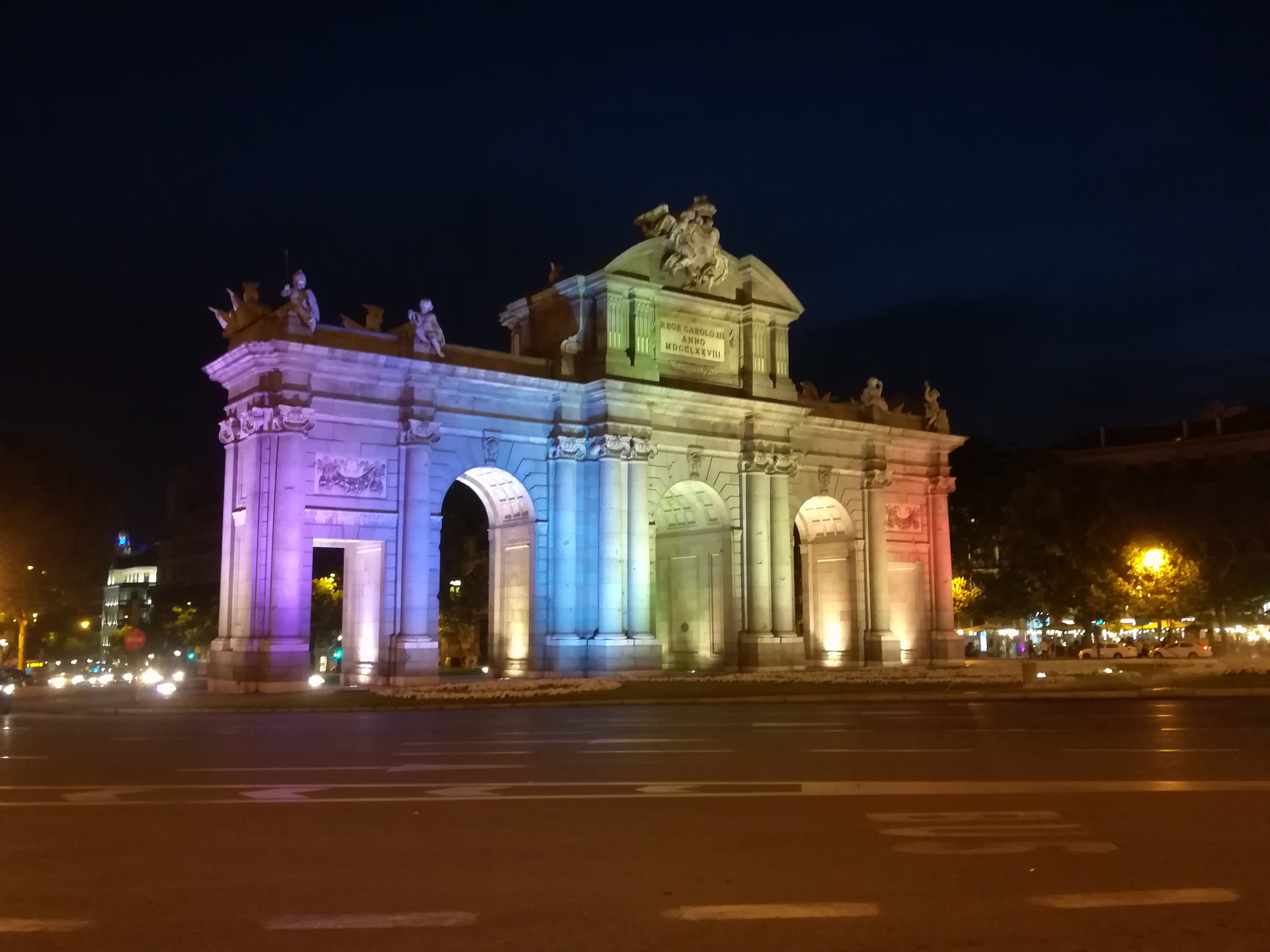
Puerta de Alcalá, Madrid, illuminated with the rainbow colours during the celebrations of WorldPride 2017

This celebration in Madrid coincided in time with the 24th Europride, which was hosted for the second time in the Spanish capital (the first one was in 2007). It took place from June 23 to July 2, 2017. The event's slogan was "Whoever you love, Madrid loves you!", and the song chosen as the anthem was "¿A quién le importa?" by Alaska y Dinarama, which was specially adapted for the event with the collaboration of several Spanish popular singers among the LGBT community, including Fangoria – the band of two of the three former members of Alaska y Dinarama.

WorldPride Madrid 2017 also coincided with two key anniversaries in the history of the LGBT community in Madrid and Spain: the 40th anniversary of the first demonstration in Spain in support of the rights of LGBT people – which took place in Barcelona in 1977 – and the 25th anniversary of the foundation of the State Federation of Lesbians, Gays, Transsexuals and Bisexuals (FELGTB, from Federación Estatal de Lesbianas, Gays, Transexuales y Bisexuales).

The opening ceremony of the event took place at the Calderón Theatre on Friday, June 23, 2017. Few days later, on Monday, June 26, the Madrid Summit, the International Conference on Human Rights, was inaugurated at the Autonomous University of Madrid. Several cultural events took place in the subsequent days, including the traditional and massive demonstration on July 1, with up to 52 floats going through the 2 kilometers between Atocha (Plaza del Emperador Carlos V) and Plaza de Colón. The WorldPride closing ceremony took place on July 2 at Puerta de Alcalá, giving the baton to New York City for the celebration of WorldPride 2019.

=== Stonewall 50 – WorldPride NYC 2019 ===
In 2019, WorldPride was hosted in New York City by Heritage of Pride as Stonewall 50 — WorldPride NYC 2019; it marked the 50th anniversary of the Stonewall riots on June 28, 1969 in New York City's Greenwich Village neighborhood, which are widely considered to be the most important event leading to the gay liberation movement and the modern fight for LGBT rights in the United States.

An estimated five million people attended events in Manhattan during the final weekend of WorldPride NYC alone, making it the largest LGBT pride event ever held. The NYC Pride March had an estimated 150,000 pre-registered participants, making it the largest parade in city history.

=== WorldPride Copenhagen–Malmö 2021 ===
For the first time in history, WorldPride was held in two cities in two countries from 12 to 22 August 2021—Copenhagen, the capital of Denmark, and the Swedish neighbouring city Malmö, both in the Øresund Region. WorldPride was hosted by Copenhagen Pride, with Malmö Pride as a partner. The cities are a twenty/thirty-minute commute apart.

WorldPride was combined with EuroGames and other activities held simultaneously in that same area, with the event branded as 'Copenhagen 2021'. The WorldPride event will coincide with two LGBTQ anniversaries: seventy years since the world's first successful genital reconstructive surgery in Denmark in 1951; and fifty years after Gay Liberation Front's Danish chapter was founded in 1971.

The Crown Princess of Denmark was patron of the event, making her the first ever royal to serve as patron for a major LGBTQ event.

Despite the ongoing COVID-19 pandemic having an impact on major events, organisers of Copenhagen 2021 said in early January 2021 that they are "continuing to plan for full delivery of all Copenhagen 2021 events taking into the account the guidance and recommendations" of government agencies. Organisers have also said that they will not cancel or postpone the events, instead moving to a digital model if in-person events cannot be delivered.

=== Sydney WorldPride 2023 ===
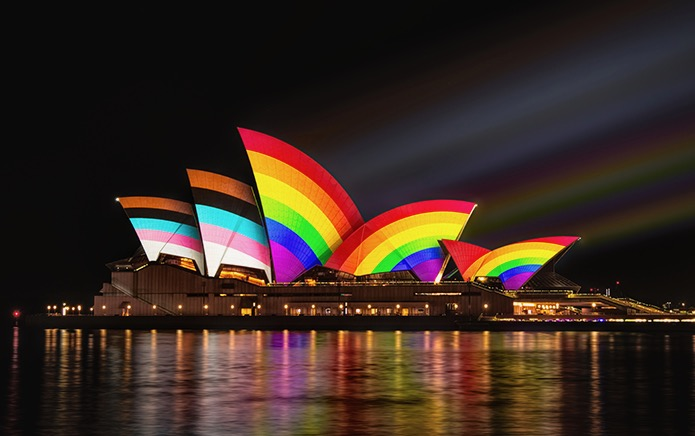
The Sydney Opera House was lit up with the Progress Pride flag colours for WorldPride in 2023.

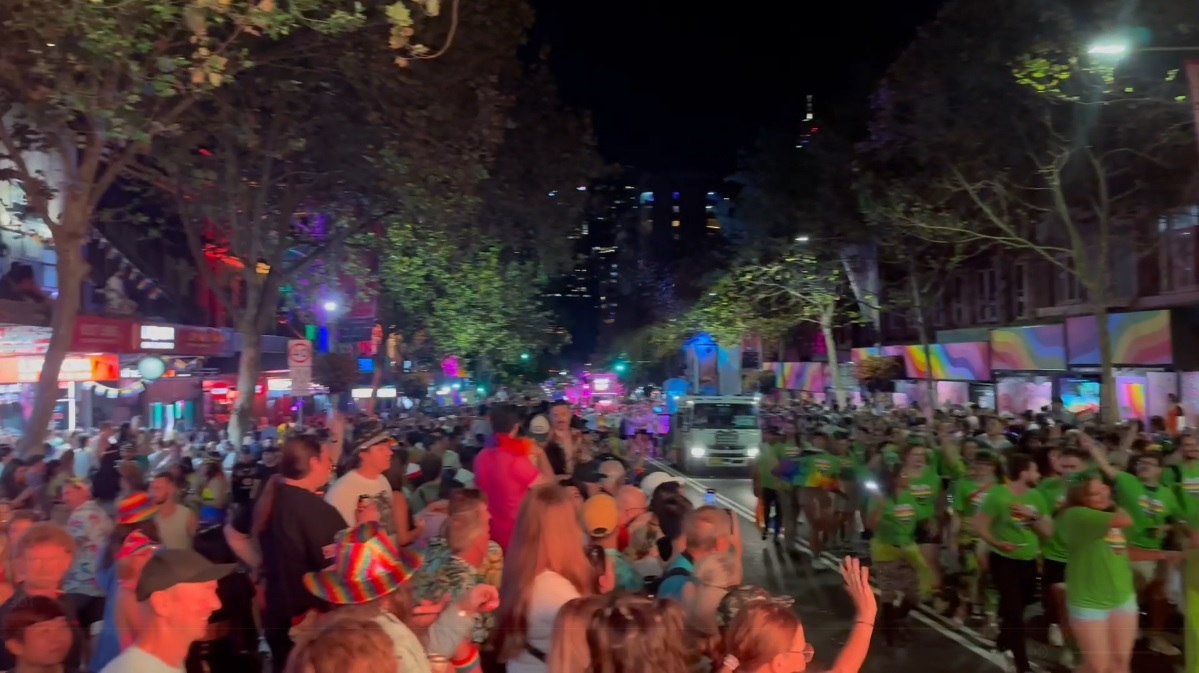
Over 250,000 people watched the Sydney Gay and Lesbian Mardi Gras parade along Oxford st, in Darlinghurst during Sydney WorldPride in 2023.

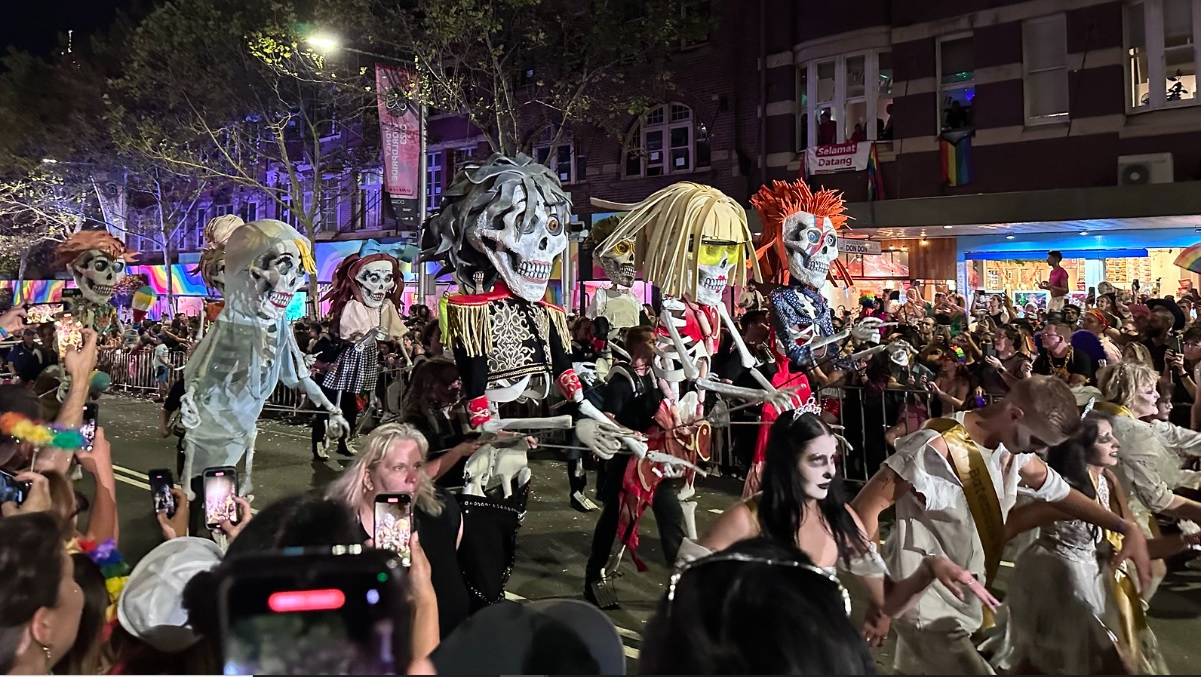
A float in the 2023 Mardi Gras parade. The skeleton on the right references the fictional character Ziggy Stardust that David Bowie would perform as in his concerts during his glam rock era from 1972 – 1974.

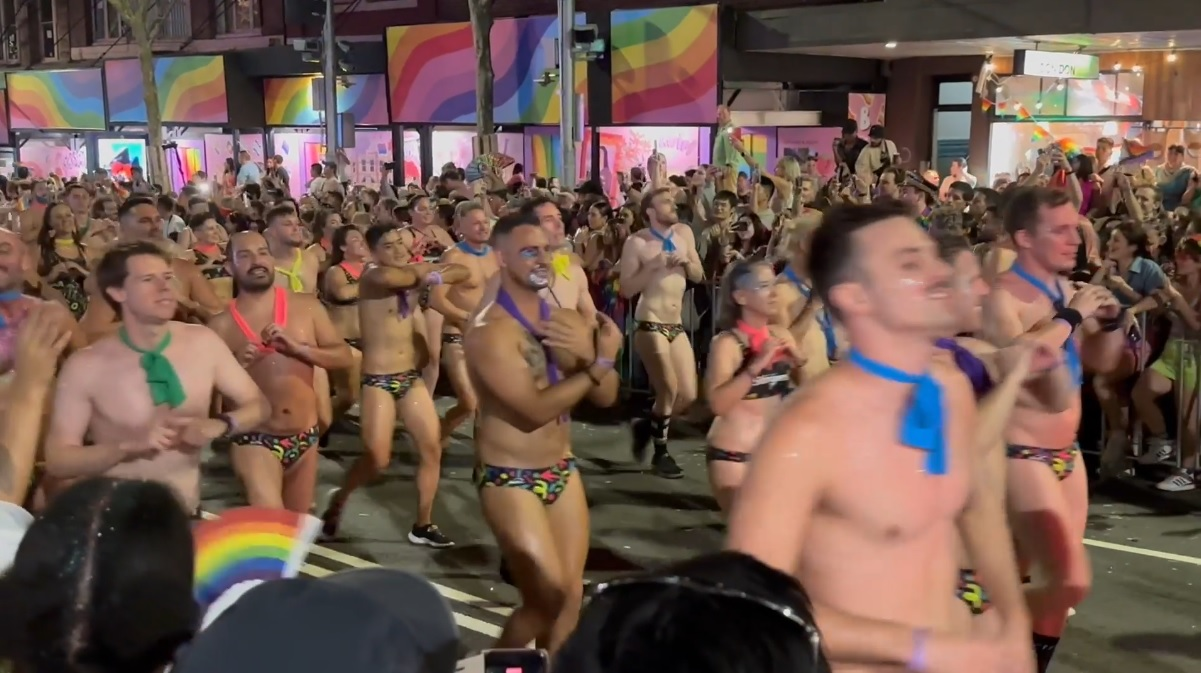
People participating in the Mardi Gras Parade. In the background can be seen construction hoardings that were installed along the Mardi Gras parade route on Oxford street in December 2022 and the hoardings celebrated LGBTQIA+ stories in Sydney. 2023.

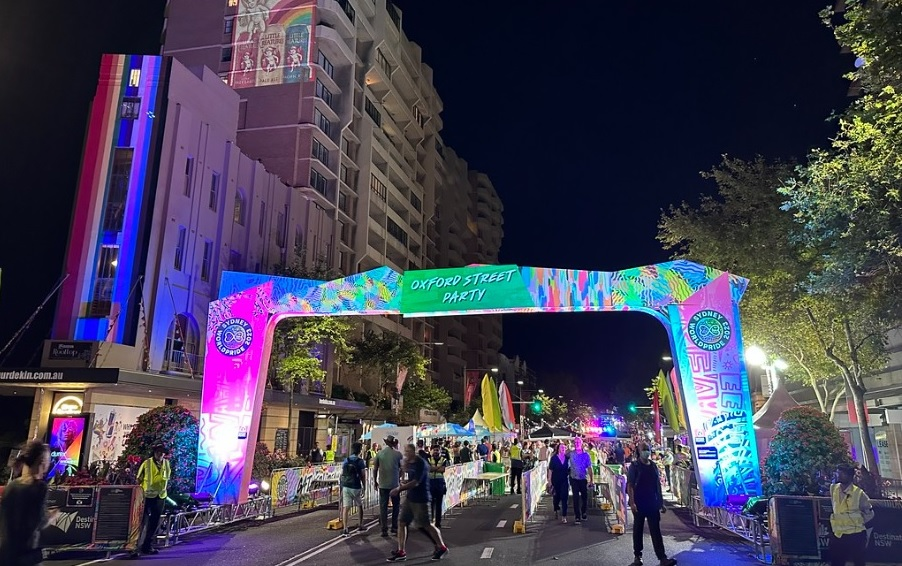
Entrance to the Oxford st party, held on Oxford st in Darlinghurst during Sydney WorldPride in 2023.

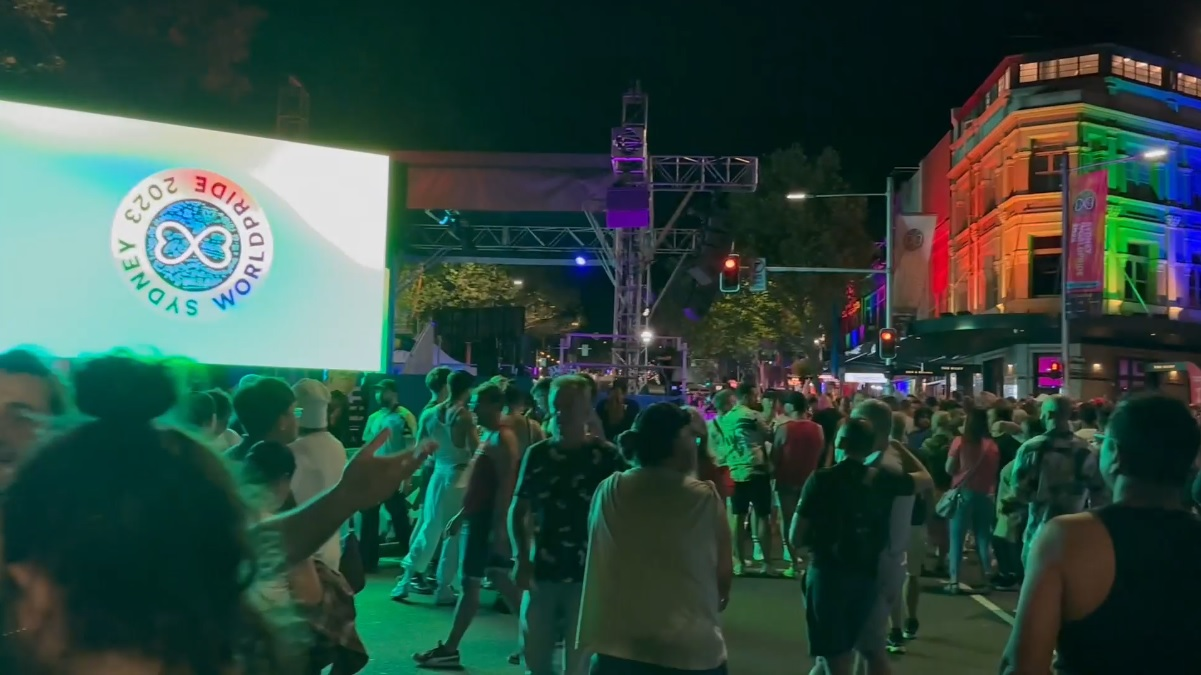
Crowds during the Oxford st party. 2023

At InterPride's 2019 meeting in Athens, WorldPride 2023 was awarded to Sydney, which received 60% of the vote ahead of the other bid contenders Montreal (36%) and Houston (3%). It would mark the 45th anniversary of Sydney Gay and Lesbian Mardi Gras—Australia's largest and longest-running LGBT pride event, and five years since same-sex marriage was recognized in Australia. It was the first WorldPride hosted in the Southern Hemisphere and Asia-Pacific. The event planned to highlight the state of LGBT rights in the Asia-Pacific region, as well as the involvement of Indigenous peoples in Australia's LGBT community (which would be the subject of an event programme at Carriageworks).

Sydney WorldPride 2023, with its official theme 'Gather, Dream, Amplify', was held between 17 February and 5 March during Australia's summer. The festival's official theme song was "We the People" by Electric Fields. WorldPride consisted of a 17-day combined 45th Anniversary Sydney Gay & Lesbian Mardi Gras/WorldPride 2023 Festival. The centrepiece was a three-day LGBTIQ+ Human Rights Conference focusing on LGBTIQ+ people's experiences of discrimination and persecution in the Asia Pacific region and more broadly.

During the 17 days of the 2023 Mardi Gras festival there were 310,000 people who attended festival events which included large scale events such as the WorldPride opening ceremony in the Domain, Fair Day, the Mardi Gras after party and Bondi Beach party. Of those 310,000 people, 103,800 were visitors to Sydney and 21,000 people were international visitors.

In February and March 2023, a new temporary exhibition about queer stories in Sydney titled "Qtopia" was held to coinicde with Sydney WorldPride and it was located in two levels of the bandstand pavilion in Green Park, Darlinghurst, as well as at the National Art School that sits adjacent to Green Park. One year after Sydney WorldPride in 2024 the exhibition became a permanent museum that sits across three main sites which include the main building at 301 Forbes St., Darlinghurst, the substation and the underground toilet block, all of which are located at the northern end of Taylor Square.

The underground toilet block was opened to the public in 1907 and then closed in 1998 and it now hosts "exhibitions exploring Sydney's gay beat, sauna and cruising culture of the 1980s and 90s." and it was itself the location of a popular beat in Sydney for decades until its closure.

The new museum has an extensive collection of objects related to queer culture in Sydney and the substations 40-seat theatre hosts performances including music, drag, comedy, cabaret and poetry all year round with numerous performances held during Mardi Gras in February and March of each year.

The Sydney Opera House was lit up in Progress Pride flag colours during WorldPride 2023, and new rainbow public artworks were installed across Sydney including a new rainbow path at Waterman's Cove in Barangaroo. In December 2022 construction hoardings were installed along the Mardi Gras parade route on Oxford street in Darlinghurst and the hoardings celebrated LGBTQIA+ stories in Sydney. They remained in place until around September 2025 when two thirds of them were removed.

Other signature events included:

- 19 February – Fair Day
- 24 February – The Opening Ceremony features performances by Kylie Minogue and Dannii Minogue, Charli XCX, Jessica Mauboy, Deborah Cheetham Fraillon, and Electric Fields; it was hosted by Courtney Act and Casey Donovan
- 25 February – Mardi Gras Parade
- 25 February – Mardi Gras Party, featuring Sugababes and Agnes
- 26 February – Laneway
- 26 February – Domain Dance Party, featuring Kelly Rowland
- First Nations Gathering Space
- 1–3 March – Human Right Conference
- First Nations Gala Concert
- Mardi Gras International Arts Festival
- 30th Mardi Gras Film Festival
- 4 March – Bondi Beach Party, featuring Nicole Scherzinger
- 5 March – Pride March (over the Sydney Harbour Bridge)
- 5 March – Closing Ceremony, featuring MUNA, Kim Petras, G Flip and Ava Max.

=== Washington, D.C. WorldPride 2025 ===
WorldPride 2025 was hosted by Capital Pride in Washington, D.C., which was awarded the event in November 2022.

The 2025 event was initially awarded to Kaohsiung, Taiwan, marking the first WorldPride planned to be held in Asia. However, WorldPride and the Kaohsiung hosts came into conflict over the branding of the event, and withdrew in August 2022; WorldPride had requested that the event be named "WorldPride Kaohsiung" or "WorldPride Kaohsiung, Taiwan", despite having previously agreed to using "Taiwan" (which was chosen for alignment with Taiwan Pride, and to be inclusive of plans for associated events outside of Kaohsiung). WorldPride stated that this was for consistency with its prior events (which have typically used the host city name), but reports indicated that WorldPride's changes may have been politically-motivated due to Chinese government policies that do not recognize Taiwan as a separate country from China. Taiwan's Ministry of Foreign Affairs expressed regret over the cancelation, claiming the outcome would harm Asia’s vast LGBTIQ+ community. Taiwan Pride claimed "major discrepancies between our stances on the event’s naming, understandings of Taiwan’s culture and expectations of what a WorldPride event should look like".

The 2024 election of Donald Trump for a second term as president led to some organizations re-evaluating their participation in WorldPride due to his stances on the LGBTQ community, including executive orders targeting the transgender community. In February 2025, Egale Canada announced it would not participate in WorldPride or any other U.S.-hosted LGBT event in 2025 due to safety concerns, and in protest of Trump's policy decisions. Consulting firm Booz Allen Hamilton also pulled its corporate sponsorship citing executive orders, likely referring to Executive Order 14155—which prohibits the U.S. government from contracting with companies that promote diversity, equity, and inclusion (DEI). WorldPride stated that "we are navigating current challenges and many unknowns", and that "we are confident, however, that we will have the support necessary to have a successful and safe WorldPride that meets this moment." InterPride itself has issued a travel advisory for the United States effective 13 March 2025, citing executive order requirements on passports. In April 2025 the Kennedy Center canceled all events it planned to host during WorldPride; the Center's board had recently been fired and replaced by Trump appointees, who then elected Trump as chairman.

The WorldPride Music Festival on June 6 and 7, headlined by Jennifer Lopez, Troye Sivan, and Zedd, was produced by Jake Resnicow and Insomniac and held at the RFK Festival Grounds.

=== WorldPride Amsterdam 2026 ===
Amsterdam hosted WorldPride and EuroPride in The Netherlands from July 25 to August 8, 2026, with the National Pride March on 25 July, the Open Air Film Festival beginning 28 July, Canal Parade on 1 August, Human Rights Concert on 4 August, and WorldPride March on 8 August.

== Editions ==
No.	Year	Host city	Host organization	Date(s)	Theme
1	2000	Rome, Italy	Circolo di Cultura Omosessuale Mario Mieli	1 July – 9 July	In Pride We Trust
2	2006	(Israel) Jerusalem	Jerusalem Open House	6 August – 12 August; 10 November (parade)	Love Without Borders
3	2012	London, United Kingdom	Pride London	7 July	—N/a
4	2014	Toronto, Canada	Pride Toronto	20 June – 29 June	Rise Up
5	2017	Madrid, Spain	Madrid Pride	23 June – 2 July	Whoever you love, Madrid loves you!
6	2019	New York City, United States	Heritage of Pride	1 June – 30 June	Millions of moments of Pride
7	2021	Copenhagen, Denmark; Malmö, Sweden	Copenhagen Pride and Malmö Pride	12 August – 22 August	#YouAreIncluded
8	2023	Sydney, Australia	Sydney Gay and Lesbian Mardi Gras	17 February – 5 March	Gather, Dream, Amplify
9	2025	Washington, D.C., United States	Capital Pride Alliance	17 May – 8 June	The Fabric of Freedom
10	2026	Amsterdam, Netherlands	Pride Amsterdam	25 July – 8 August	Unity
11	2028	Cape Town, South Africa	Cape Town Pride	30 September – 14 October	TBA
12	2030	Barcelona, Spain	Pride Barcelona	28 June – 28 July	Let's Think, Let's Answer, Let's Change!

=== Bids ===
Edition	Year	Bid party			Result	Final selection process		Ref.
Edition	Year	City	Country	Organization	Result	Date	InterPride GM&WC	Ref.
1	2000	Rome	Italy	Circolo di Cultura Omosessuale Mario Mieli	Bid accepted (sole bid)	October 1997	16th in New York City, United States	
2	2006	Jerusalem	Israel	Jerusalem Open House	Bid accepted (sole bid)	October 2003	22nd in Montreal, Canada	
3	2012	London	United Kingdom	Pride London	Win (majority)	October 2008	27th in Vancouver, Canada	
3	2012	Stockholm	Sweden	Stockholm Pride	Loss	October 2008	27th in Vancouver, Canada	
4	2014	Toronto	Canada	Pride Toronto	Round 1: 77–61 (for Toronto); Round 2: 78% (for Toronto)	October 2009	28th in St. Petersburg, United States	
4	2014	Stockholm	Sweden	Stockholm Pride	Round 1: 77–61 (for Toronto); Round 2: 78% (for Toronto)	October 2009	28th in St. Petersburg, United States	
5	2017	Madrid	Spain	Madrid Pride	Win (100%)	October 2012	31st in Boston, United States	
5	2017	Berlin	Germany	CSD Berlin Pride	Loss (0%)	October 2012	31st in Boston, United States	
5	2017	Sydney	Australia	Sydney Gay and Lesbian Mardi Gras	Loss (0%)	October 2012	31st in Boston, United States	
6	2019	New York City	United States	NYC Pride; Heritage of Pride	Bid accepted (sole bid)	October 2015	34th in Las Vegas, United States	
7	2021	Copenhagen and Malmö	Denmark; Sweden	Copenhagen Pride; Malmö Pride	Win (~2/3)	October 2017	36th in Indianapolis, United States	
7	2021	Fort Lauderdale	United States	Pride Fort Lauderdale	Loss (~1/3)	October 2017	36th in Indianapolis, United States	
8	2023	Sydney	Australia	Sydney Gay and Lesbian Mardi Gras	Win (60%)	October 2019	38th in Athens, Greece	
8	2023	Montreal	Canada	Fierté Montréal	Loss (36%)	October 2019	38th in Athens, Greece	
8	2023	Houston	United States	Pride Houston	Loss (3%)	October 2019	38th in Athens, Greece	
9	2025	~~Kaohsiung~~	~~Taiwan~~	~~Kaohsiung Pride~~	Win (later withdrew)	6 November 2021	40th held online	
9	2025	Washington, D.C.	United States	Capital Pride Alliance	Loss (first bid)	6 November 2021 (first bid)	40th held online (first bid)	
9	2025	Washington, D.C.	United States	Capital Pride Alliance	Win (74%) (second bid)	27 – 30 October 2022 (second bid)	41st in Guadalajara, Mexico (second bid)	
10	2026	Amsterdam	Netherlands	Pride Amsterdam	Win (59%)	27 – 30 October 2022	41st in Guadalajara, Mexico	
10	2026	Orlando	United States	Come Out with Pride Orlando	Loss (37%)	27 – 30 October 2022	41st in Guadalajara, Mexico	
11	2028	Cape Town	South Africa	Cape Town Pride	Win (53%)	23 – 27 October 2024	43rd in Medellín, Colombia	
11	2028	Guadalajara	Mexico	Guadalajara Pride	Loss (44%)	23 – 27 October 2024	43rd in Medellín, Colombia	
12	2030	Bangkok	Thailand	Bangkok Pride	Loss (16%)	November 2026	44th in Patong, Thailand	
12	2030	Barcelona	Spain	Pride Barcelona	Win (84%)	November 2026	44th in Patong, Thailand	

== See also ==
- Europride
- Pride parade
- List of largest LGBT events
