= EuroPride =

Annual LGBTQ event in Europe

- Status: Active
- Genre: LGBTQ pride event
- Date: Midyear
- Frequency: Annual
- Location: Europe
- Inaugurated: 1992

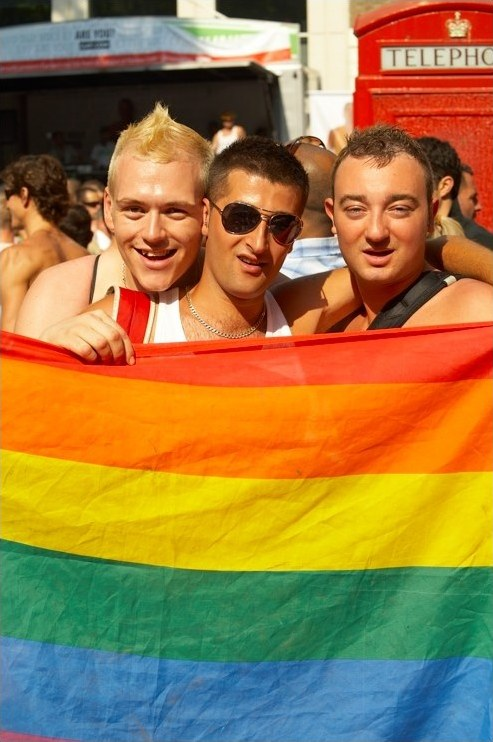
Participants at the Europride London 2006 event

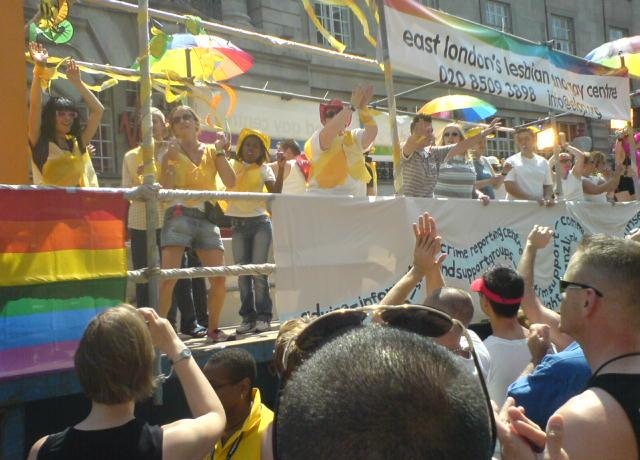
Float of East London's Lesbian and Gay Centre, London 2006

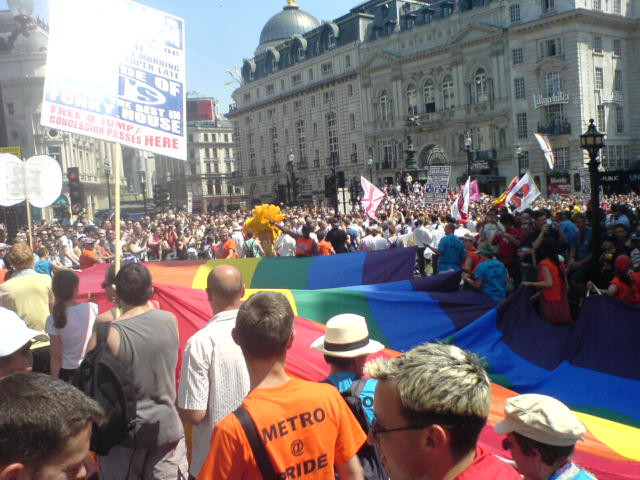
Rainbow flag at Piccadilly Circus, London 2006

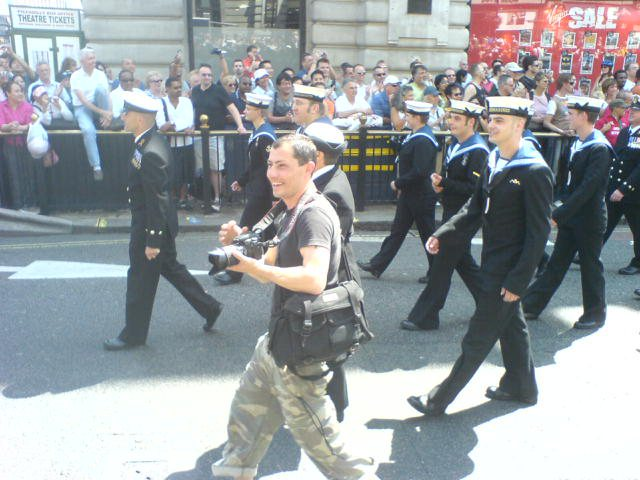
Naval personnel, London 2006

EuroPride is a pan-European international event dedicated to LGBTQ pride, hosted by a different European city each year. The host city is usually one with an established pride event or a significant LGBTQ community.

For up to a month, numerous sporting, artistic and human rights events are staged throughout the host city. EuroPride usually culminates during a weekend with a traditional Mardi Gras-style pride parade, live music, human rights conference, special club nights, and an AIDS memorial vigil.

== History ==
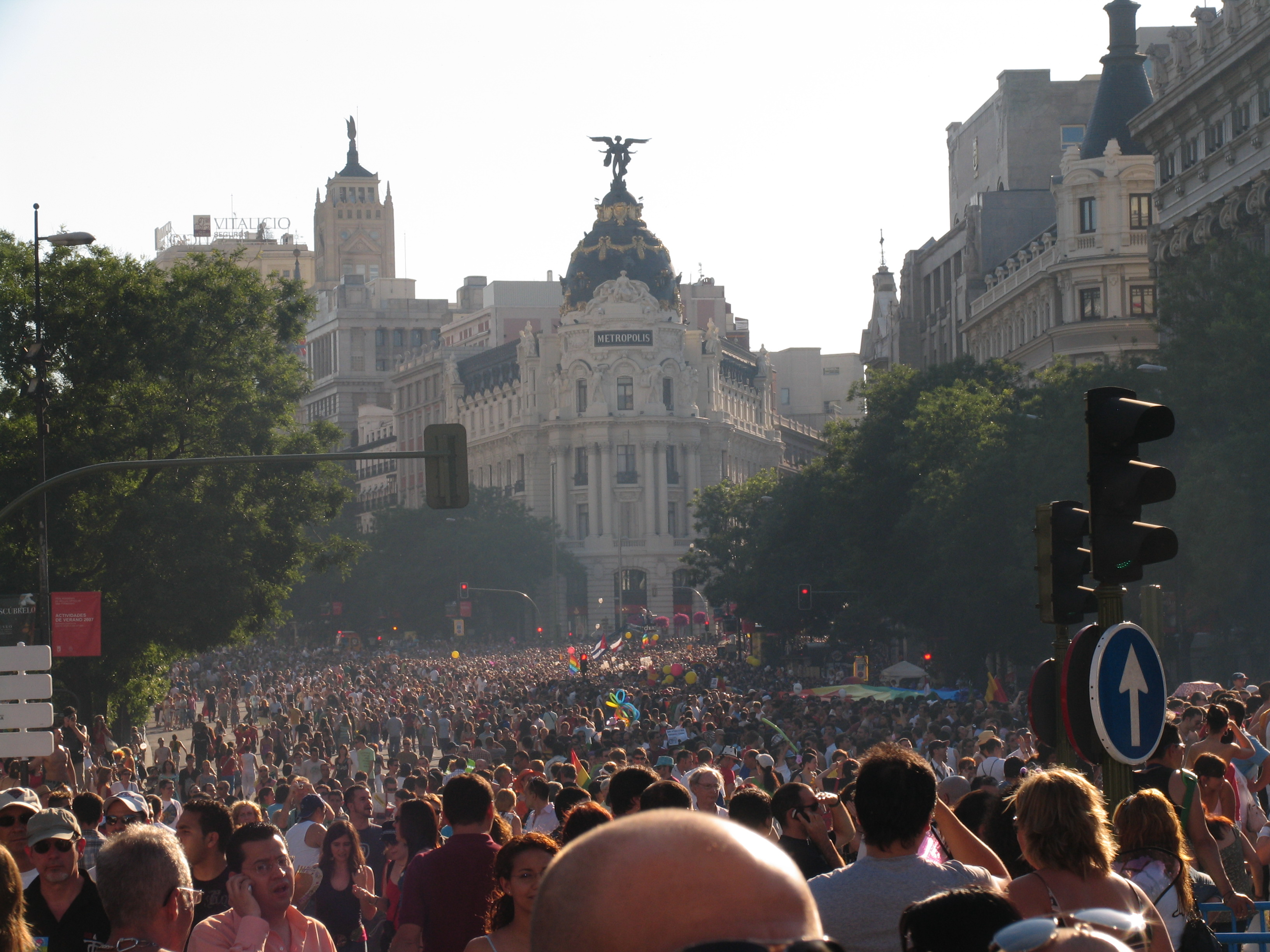
Europride Madrid July 2007

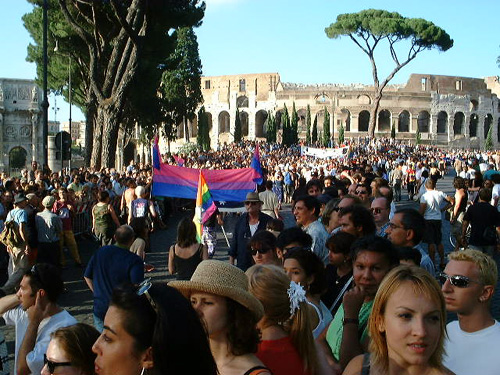
WorldPride 2000 in Rome

EuroPride was inaugurated in London in 1992, attended by estimated crowds of over 100,000. The following year, Berlin hosted the festivities. When Amsterdam hosted EuroPride in 1994, it turned into a financial disaster, leaving debts of approximately 450,000 euros. In 1996, EuroPride moved to Copenhagen, where it enjoyed strong support from city leaders. The organisers were successful on all fronts but not able to achieve a financial surplus.

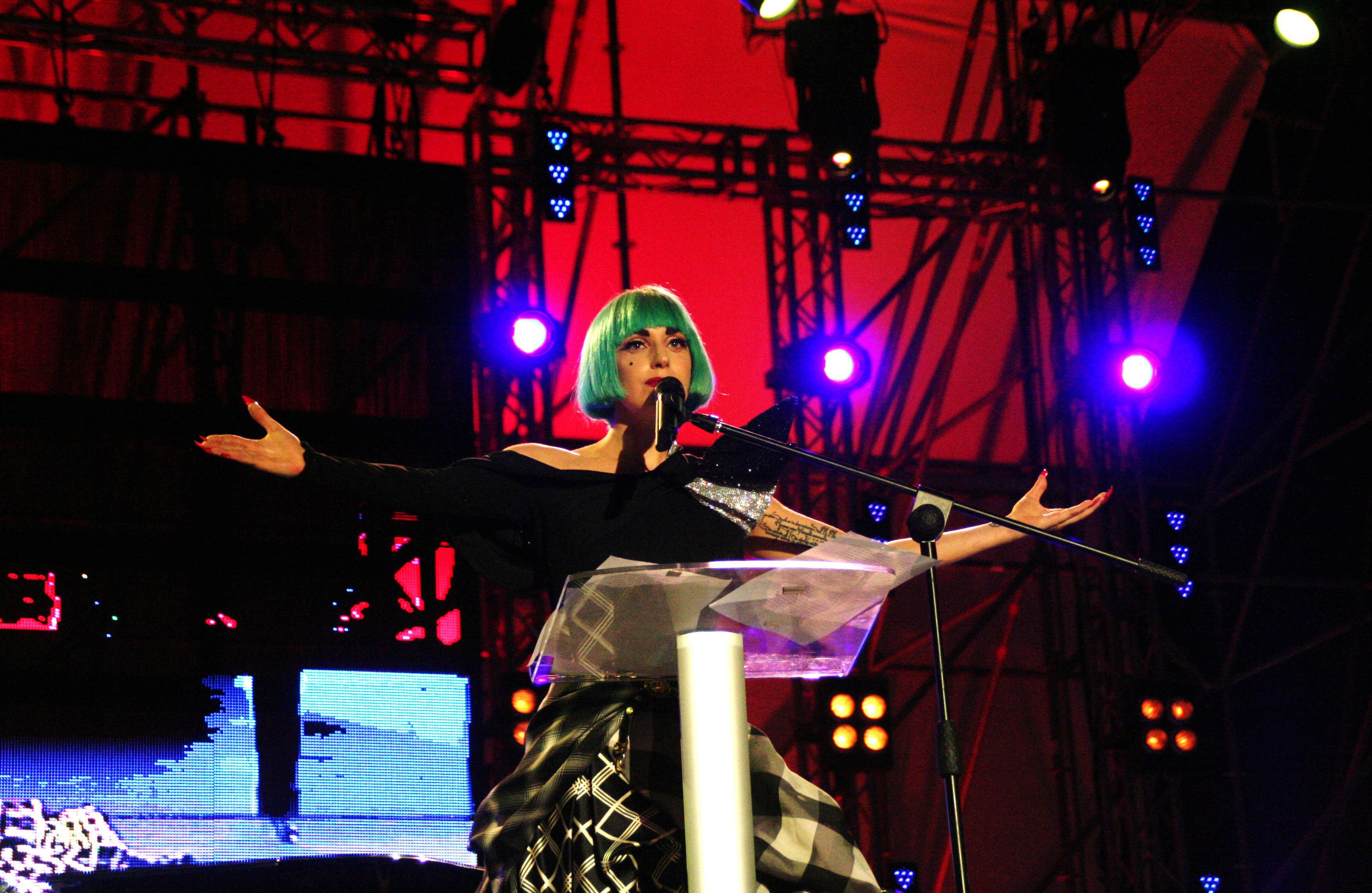
Lady Gaga at Rome Europride 2011

Paris hosted EuroPride in 1997. The festival had numerous commercial sponsors and was widely hailed as a success. During the parade, over 300,000 people marched to the Bastille. Stockholm was the host city in 1998. London was to host EuroPride again in 1999, but the event was canceled when the organisers went bankrupt.

In 2000, WorldPride took place for the first time and, as has happened each time since, when WorldPride is in Europe, no separate EuroPride takes place. The event took place in Rome and was well-attended by LGBTQ people from all over the world. After initially supporting the event, city leaders pulled their support just days before due to pressure exerted by the Vatican, which was organising its Great Jubilee.

Vienna hosted the 2001 EuroPride, drawing large crowds from Central Europe. In 2002, Köln (Cologne), Germany, held the then-biggest ever EuroPride; officials estimated crowds to number well over one million. EuroPride was hosted by Manchester in 2003, with Ian McKellen as the guest of honour and Hamburg in 2004. Oslo hosted it in 2005.

London hosted the event in 2006, organising a two-week festival culminating in a parade on the final day (1 July) in which marchers were invited to walk down Oxford Street, one of the city's busiest shopping streets, the first time they had been legally allowed to do so. The parade was attended by Mayor of London Ken Livingstone, Conservative MP Alan Duncan, human rights campaigner Peter Tatchell, and the first transgender MEP, Italian Vladimir Luxuria.

Following the parade, events were held in three of the capital's squares: a rally in Trafalgar Square addressed by Ian McKellen, and entertainment in Leicester and Soho Squares. EuroPride 2006 marked the first time that London's main pride rally and entertainment areas were staged within the city itself, rather than in open parks.

In 2007, Madrid hosted EuroPride, which took place in Chueca, the capital's gay village, during the last week in June. Madrid was chosen because of the gay marriage and gender identity laws Spain had passed during the previous two years. More than 1.2 million people attended the final parade as it passed through the downtown streets of Alcalá, and Gran Vía, ending up at Plaza de España. For the first time, Madrid City Hall contributed financing to the MADO (Madrid Orgullo) organisation. In addition, a private event, the Infinitamentegay Party, took place in Casa de Campo Park.

In 2008, the Stockholm Pride organization organised EuroPride for a second time, held from 25 June to 3 August in Stockholm, a decade after hosting EuroPride 1998.

Zurich hosted EuroPride in 2009 with a month-long roster of events from 2 May to 7 June, culminating in a parade through downtown Zurich on 6 June.

The 2010 event was held in Warsaw, Poland. Organisers prepared multifaceted events between July 9 to 18. The Parade took place on July 17. It marked the first time this pan-European LGBTQ celebration took place in a former communist country. The Warsaw EuroPride formulated, as its main theme, a demand for legalisation of same sex civil partnerships.

In 2011, EuroPride returned to Rome. Hosted by Claudia Gerini, the parade closed with a performance and a speech by Lady Gaga at the Circus Maximus. That year one million people took part.

The 2013 EuroPride was in Marseille, France from July 10–20, focusing on gay marriage in France and celebrated the biggest gay wedding in Europe

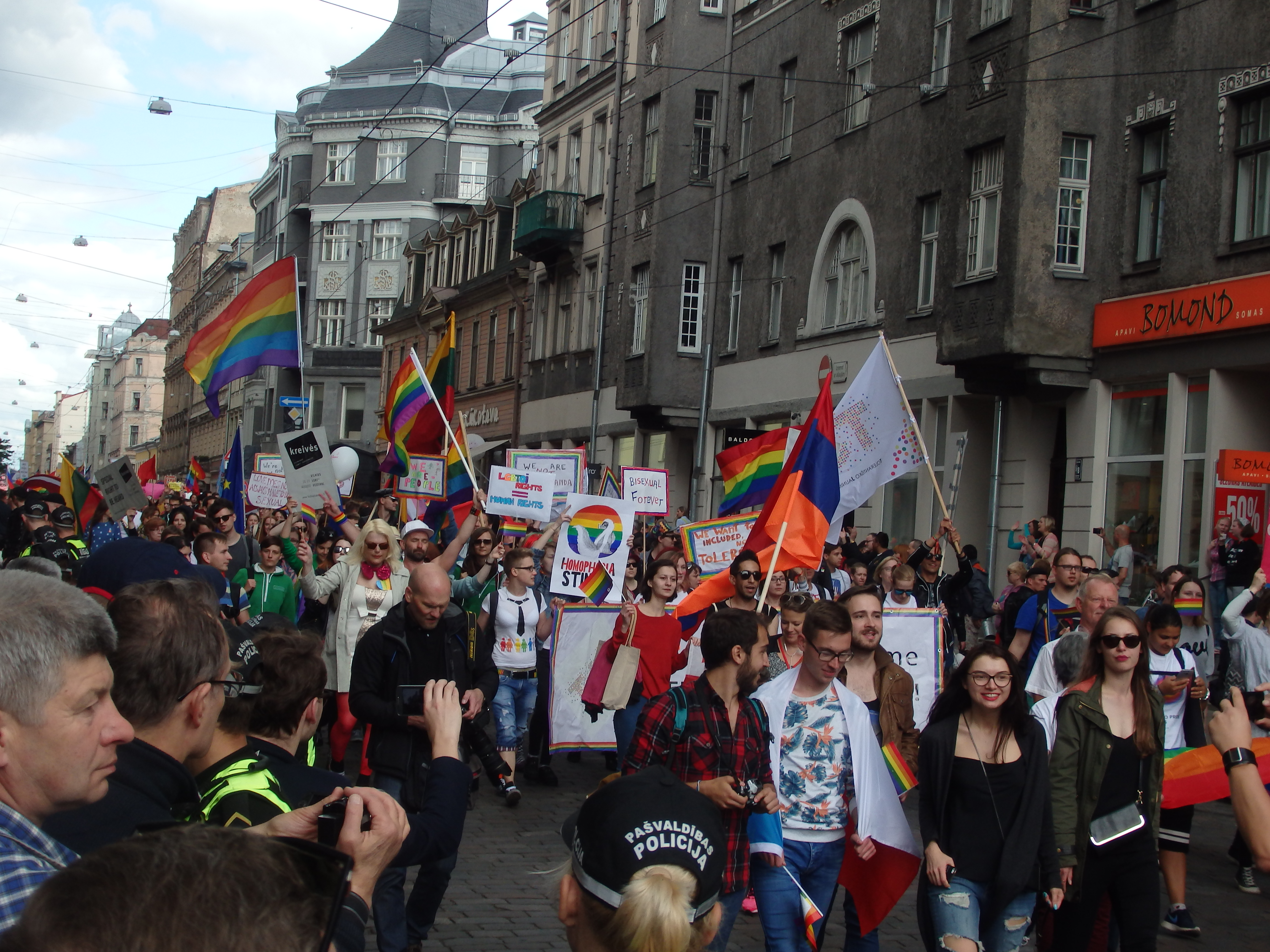
EuroPride in Riga in 2015

The 2016 EuroPride returned to Amsterdam. UK singer/songwriter Tara McDonald sang her single "I Need A Miracle" which was chosen as the EuroPride anthem and was remixed by Gregor Salto.

There was no EuroPride in 2017 as WorldPride took place in Madrid.

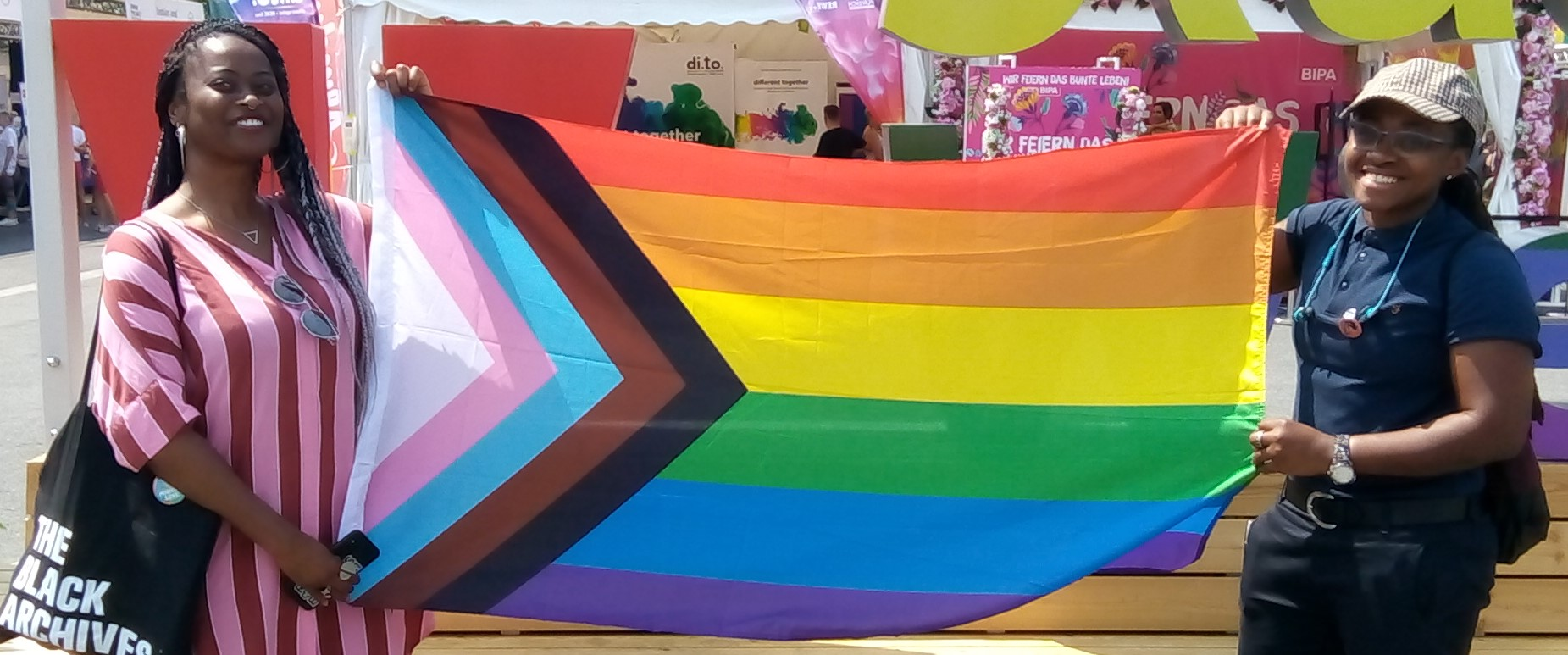
Daniel Quasar's Progress Pride Flag being displayed at EuroPride 2019 in Vienna

In June 2019, President of Austria Alexander Van der Bellen became the first head of state to address a EuroPride parade.

=== WorldPride ===
The European Pride Organisers Association, which licences EuroPride and owns the trademark, has decided that a WorldPride event held in Europe also automatically carries the title of EuroPride.

The first WorldPride was held in Rome in 2000 (see above). The second WorldPride was held in Jerusalem in 2005–2006.

London, also hosting the 2012 Summer Olympics, beat out competing candidate, Stockholm, in the fall of 2008 to hold WorldPride 2012, which was held from 23 June to 8 July.

WorldPride 2017 was held in Madrid, and WorldPride 2021 was held in Copenhagen, Denmark.

=== Madrid success ===
Madrid's EuroPride 2007 was the most well-attended event at the time, with an estimated 2.5 million visitors. This huge attendance was not only a success for Madrid, but for the whole LGBTQ Spanish community, due to the celebration of the change of terms in the laws related to gay marriage and adoptions.

Madrid was one of the first Spanish cities celebrating the legalization of gay marriage, with the support of all political parties, even the conservatives in the Government, headed by the ex-mayor of the city, Alberto Ruíz Gallardón from Partido Popular.

Due to these and other advances in same-sex freedom and social progress, Madrid was chosen in 2012 to host WorldPride 2017.

== Host cities ==
Edn	Year	Location	Organization	Theme	Dates	Pax
1st	1992	(United Kingdom) London	—N/a			100,000
2nd	1993	(Germany) Berlin	—N/a			
3rd	1994	(Netherlands) Amsterdam	—N/a			approx. 120.000
-	1995	Not held				
4th	1996	(Denmark) Copenhagen	Copenhagen Pride Association	—N/a		approx. 35,000
5th	1997	(France) Paris	—N/a			
6th	1998	(Sweden) Stockholm	—N/a			
-	1999	Not held				
7th	2000	(Italy) Rome	Circolo di Cultura Omosessuale Mario Mieli -	In Pride We Trust	1 July – 8 July	approx. 500,000
8th	2001	(Austria) Vienna	—N/a			
9th	2002	(Germany) Cologne	Kölner Lesben- und Schwulentag e.V. (KLuST)	Cologne celebrates diversity	15 June – 7 July	approx. 1,200,000
10th	2003	(United Kingdom) Manchester	Marketing Manchester	—N/a	15 August - 25 August	approx. 37,000
11th	2004	(Germany) Hamburg	Hamburg Pride e.V.	Love breaks barriers	4 June – 13 June	approx. 500,000
12th	2005	(Norway) Oslo	Europride Oslo As	—N/a	18 June – 27 June	70–100,000
13th	2006	(United Kingdom) London	—N/a			600,000
14th	2007	(Spain) Madrid	Spanish LGBT Collective Organization	Now Europe, Equality is possible	22 June – 2 July	approx 2,500,000
15th	2008	(Sweden) Stockholm	Stockholm Pride Agency	Swedish Sin Breaking Borders	25 July – 3 August	approx 80,000
16th	2009	(Switzerland) Zürich	EuroPride 09 Organising Association	Celebrating 40 years with Pride	2 May – 7 June	approx 100,000
17th	2010	(Poland) Warsaw	Equality Foundation (Fundacja Równości)	Freedom, equality, tolerance!	7 July – 17 July	approx 8,000 - 15,000
18th	2011	(Italy) Rome	Circolo di Cultura Omosessuale Mario Mieli	Build Your Pride!	2 June – 12 June	approx. 1,000,000
19th	2012	(United Kingdom) London	Pride London	—N/a	23 June – 8 July	—N/a
20th	2013	(France) Marseille	LGP Marseille	L'Europe en marche pour l'égalité - Europe on the move for equality!	10 July – 20 July	—N/a
21st	2014	(Norway) Oslo	Oslo Pride AS	—N/a	20 June – 29 June	—N/a
22nd	2015	(Latvia) Riga	LGBT and their friends association MOZAĪKA	Be the Change! Make History! Changing history is hot!	15 June – 21 June	approx. 5,000
23rd	2016	(Netherlands) Amsterdam	Stichting Amsterdam Gay Pride	JOIN our freedom, feel free to join us!	26 July – 7 August	approx. 560,000
24th	2017	(Spain) Madrid	Spanish LGBT Collective Organization	For the LGBT rights over the world	23 June – 2 July	approx. 3,000,000
25th	2018	(Sweden) Stockholm and Gothenburg	Stockholm Pride & West Pride (Gothenburg)	Two Cities, One Festival - for a United Europe	27 July – 19 August	approx. 60,000
26th	2019	(Austria) Vienna	HOSI Wien	Visions of Pride	1 June – 16 June	approx. 500,000
-	2020	(Greece) Thessaloniki	Not held due to Covid pandemic (Note: The EuroPride 2020 was cancelled due to the COVID-19 pandemic.)	Welcome to the future, where everyone can join	—N/a	
27th	2021	(Denmark) Copenhagen	Copenhagen Pride and Copenhagen 2021	You Are Included	12 August – 22 August	
28th	2022	(Serbia) Belgrade	Belgrade Pride	It's time	12 September – 18 September (Note: The Government of Serbia initially banned the parade walk, although on 17 September it approved that the parade could take place. Minor incidents during the parade walk happened, orchestrated by opponents of Europride.)	approx. 10,000
29th	2023	(Malta) Valletta	Malta Pride	Equality from the Heart	7 September – 17 September	over 38,000
30th	2024	(Greece) Thessaloniki	Thessaloniki Pride	Persevere - Progress - Prosper	21 June - 29 June	approx. 36,000
31st	2025	(Portugal) Lisbon	Variações		14 June – 21 June	
32nd	2026	(Netherlands) Amsterdam	Pride Amsterdam		25 July – 8 August	
33rd	2027	(Italy) Turin	Torino Pride		18 June - 26 June	
34th	2028	(Republic of Ireland) West of Ireland (County Limerick and County Clare)	QuareClare (Clare Pride), Limerick Pride, The Outing Winter Pride Festival	Pride in the Community	4 August - 13 August	
35th	2029	(Germany) Dresden				

== European Pride Organisers Association ==
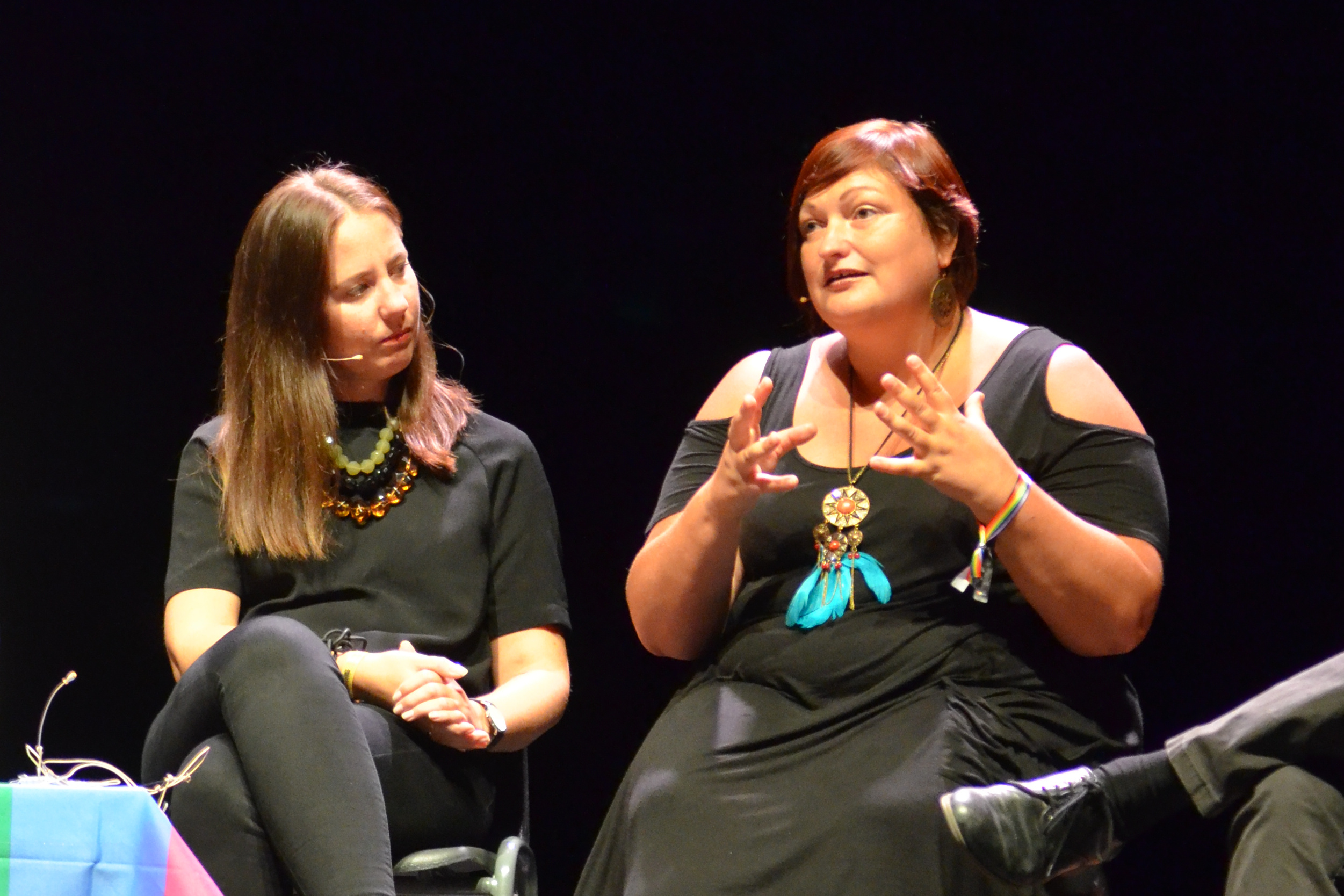
Kristine Garina, president of EPOA at Human Rights Conference, Stockholm Pride 2018

The European Pride Organisers Association (often shortened to EPOA or EuroPride) owns the EuroPride trademark and licenses its use to one Pride organisation each year.

Pride organisers from across Europe discussed the creation of a European network at conferences of InterPride and the International Lesbian & Gay Association (ILGA) in the early 1990s, and the first formal meeting of EPOA was convened in Copenhagen in 1995.

EPOA is a small organisation with eight elected board members, all of whom serve with Pride organisations in Europe. It has no paid staff, and has its headquarters in Brussels, Belgium. The board meets several times each year, often holding a meeting in a city holding its Pride event that weekend.

Any Pride organisation can become a member of EPOA upon payment of a membership fee. This gives the organisation voting rights at the Annual General Meeting, including on votes on future EuroPride bids. Membership to EPOA automatically makes a Pride a member of InterPride, its international equivalent. EPOA has more than 130 members across Europe.

Until October 2024 Ukrainian human rights activist, Lenny Emson was the president of EPOA. Since then, German activist Patrick Orth is interim President.

== See also ==
- List of LGBTQ events
- EuroGames
- List of largest LGBTQ events
- LGBTQ rights in Europe
