= Article 365 =

Article 365 may refer to:

- Article 365 of the Constitution of India
- Article 365 of the Penal Code of Chile
- Article 365 of the Sri Lankan Penal Code
