= Jorge Huneeus =

Chilean lawyer (1866–1926)

Jorge Huneeus Gana
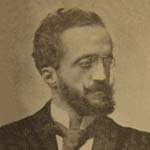

Deputy of the Republic of Chile
- In office 1897–1900
- Constituency: Llanquihue, Carelmapu, and Osorno

Deputy of the Republic of Chile
- In office 1900–1903
- Constituency: Llanquihue, Carelmapu, and Osorno

Deputy of the Republic of Chile
- In office 1903–1906
- Constituency: Llanquihue, Carelmapu, and Osorno

Deputy of the Republic of Chile
- In office 1906–1909
- Constituency: Llanquihue, Carelmapu, and Osorno

Personal details
- Born: 10 April 1866 Santiago, Chile
- Died: 2 July 1926 (aged 60) Santiago, Chile
- Party: Radical Party
- Occupation: Politician
- Profession: Attorney

Jorge Huneeus Gana (10 April 1866 – 2 July 1926) was a Chilean attorney, writer, journalist, ambassador, legislative deputy, and cabinet minister.

== Family ==
He was the son of Jorge Huneeus Zegers and Domitila Gana Cruz, and the grandson of Jorge Huneeus Lipmann (1801–1877) and the composer Isidora Zegers. He was the brother of deputies Antonio and Francisco Huneeus Gana. He was also the nephew of Domingo Gana Cruz and Pedro Nolasco Cruz Vergara, and the great-grandson of Vicente de la Cruz y Bahamonde.

He was married to Elena Lavín Recasens and had five children with her: Elena, Jorge, Berta, Sergio Luis, and Gabriela.

== Education ==
He was admitted to the College of Ballacey in 1872 and remained there for two years. In 1874 he began his secondary studies at the College of the French Fathers in Santiago. He finished his schooling in 1883, at age 17.

In 1884 he enrolled at the University of Chile to study law, and was admitted to the bar on 9 April 1888, at age 22.

== Private life ==
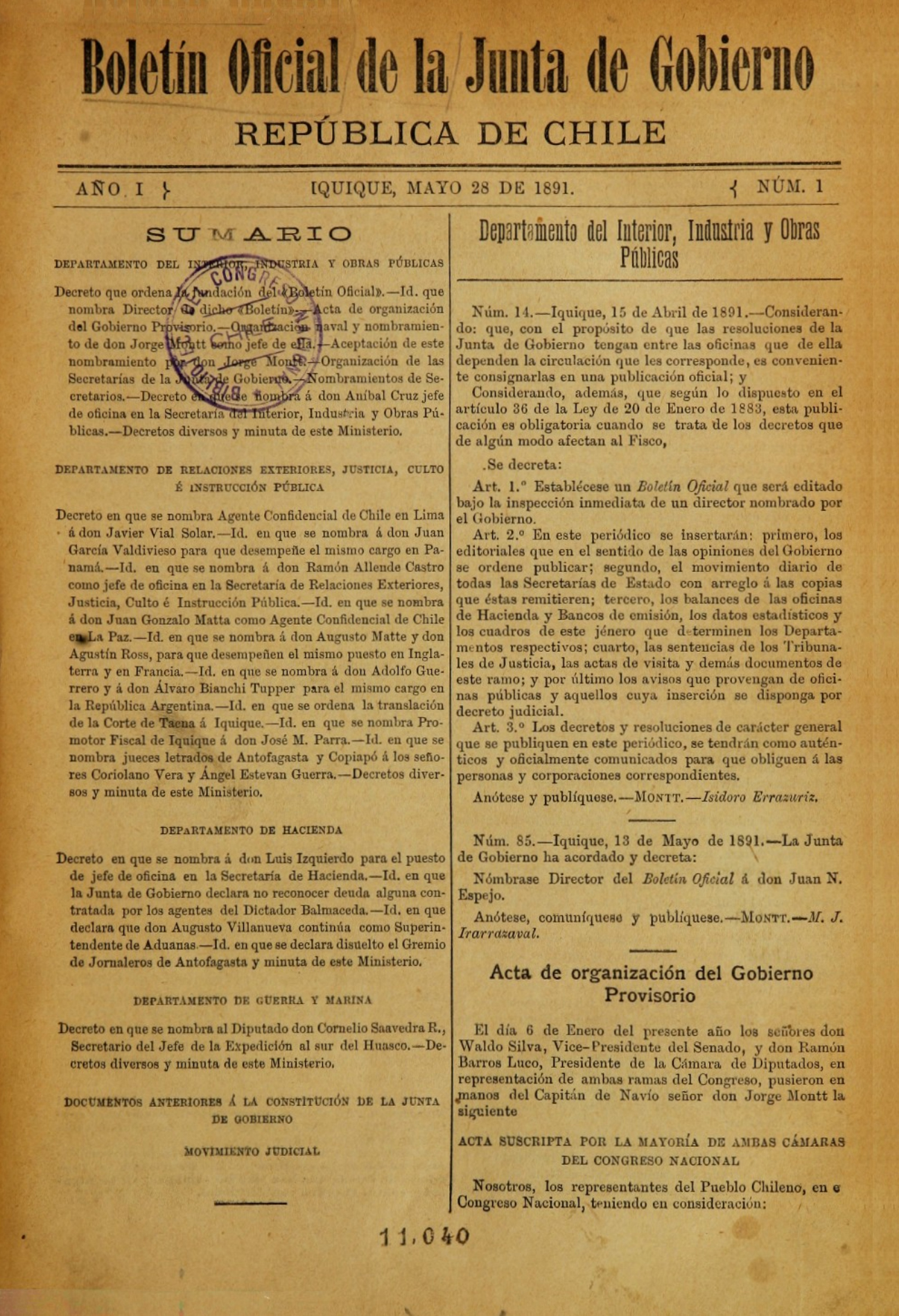
Official Bulletin of the Government Junta Edited by Jorge Huneeus Gana

In 1886, while still a college student, Jorge Huneeus Gana taught literature and history at the Chilean Army War Academy. In 1887 he taught history and law classes there.

The following are highlights of his written works:

- Brief historical review of the Chilean Constitution of 1833
- Motta: historical study
- Assessment of the Errázuriz administration and conservative government (1900)
- The Argentina-Chile friendship. The true origin of the Pacts of May. (1908)
- Historical picture of the intellectual output of Chile, Volume I (1910)
- Portales: historical study (1918)
- Chilean Writers' Library, historical picture of the intellectual evolution of Chile

The arts were Huneeus Gana's great devotion, especially music, painting, and poetry. He was a significant collector of paintings. As a journalist he collaborated on two newspapers, La Patria de Valparaíso (a daily published from 1 August 1863 to 1896) and La Ley (which he edited from its foundation on 10 June 1884, under the pseudonym "Suaviter in modo"). During the Revolution of 1891 he was editor of the Official Bulletin of the Government Junta.

He served as secretary of legal letters of Santiago in 1889 and as director of the Bulletin of Acts and Decrees of the Supreme Government in 1889.

He was also known for his close group of friends, headed by poet Rubén Darío, with Pedro Montt and Agustín Edwards Mac-Clure who were linked to the newspaper La Época where he worked. He was also associated with a group of outstanding young people, including Luis Orrego Luco, Pedro Balmaceda, Carlos Luis Hübner, and Vicente Grez.

== Public life ==
Jorge Huneeus Gana was an official of the Ministry of Foreign Affairs, Worship and Colonization.

He was a member of the Radical Party beginning in 1892, and was the Secretary of its Central Committee that year.

During the government of Pedro Montt he was named Minister of Justice and Public Instruction for the brief period from 22 January to 15 June 1909. He was deputy for Llanquihue, Carelmapu, and Osorno for the terms 1897–1900, 1900–1903, 1903–1906, and 1906–1909. He integrated several Commissions: Finance; Constitution, Legislation, and Justice; Law and Justice; Charity and Worship; and Foreign Affairs. He was a replacement member of the Conservation Commission for the recess of 1906–1907.

=== Ambassador ===
After finishing his last term as deputy, he served as Minister Plenipotentiary in Belgium and the Netherlands for six years (1912–1918).

== Album of Isidora Zegers de Huneeus ==
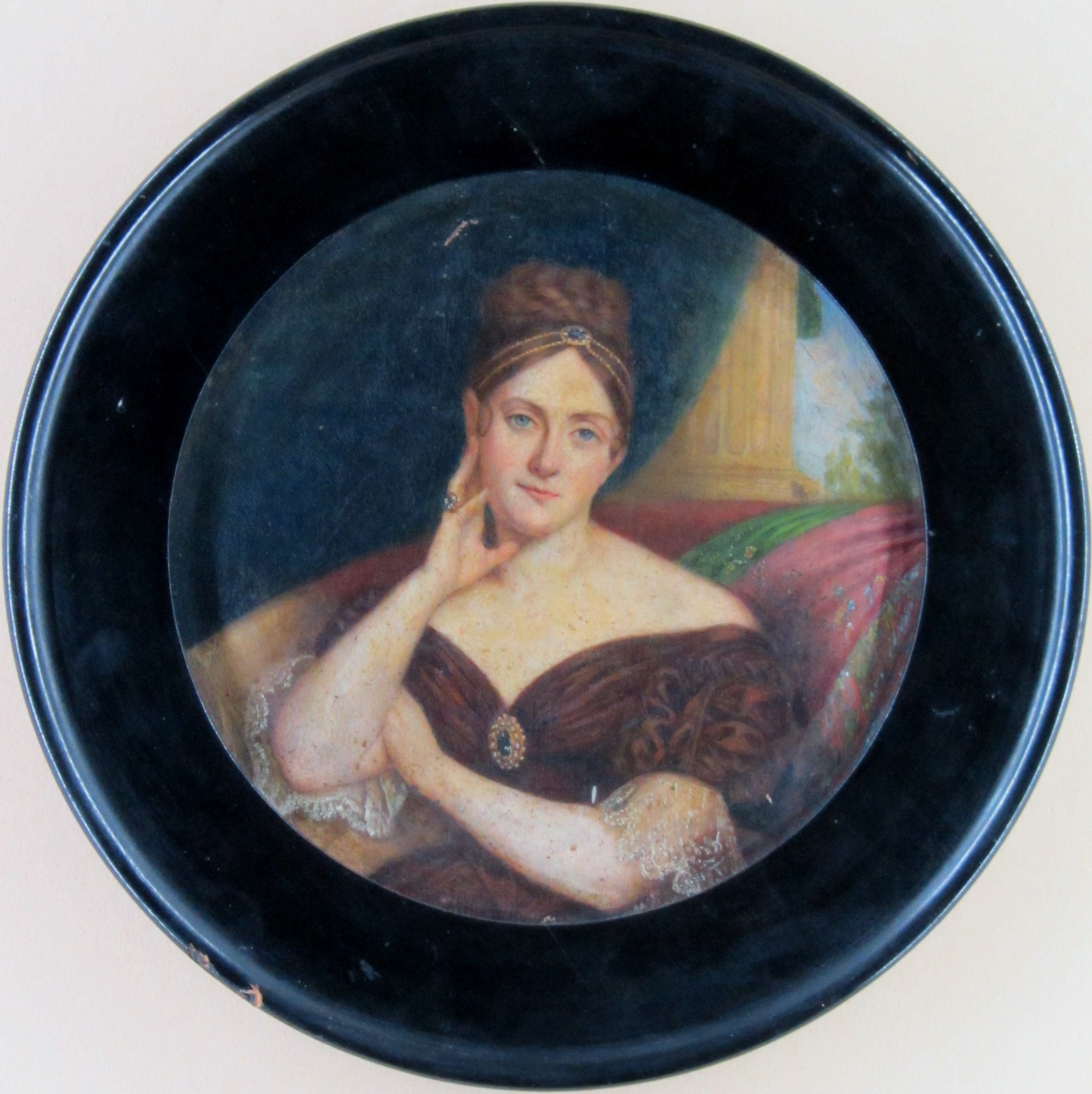
Portrait of Isidora Zegers by Raymond Monvoisin

Olga Lindholm Hunneus, daughter of Elena Huneeus Lavín, granddaughter of Jorge Huneeus Gana, and great-great-granddaughter of Isidora Zegers de Huneeus was the owner of the album, which had been a gift from her grandfather when she was just five years old. She related that after the death of Isidora Zegers in 1869, the album went to her great-grandfather, Jorge Huneeus Zegers. She further clarified:

No se sabe con certeza a quién se lo heredó a él, pero la pista se recupera con dos hermanas de apellidos Rojas Huneeus, también descendientes de Isidora Zegers, quienes estuvieron a cargo del libro hasta que las dificultades económicas las obligaron a deshacerse de él. Se lo vendieron a su primo Jorge Huneeus Gana.

Además agrega:

En ese entonces yo vivía con mi abuelito y todos los días, apenas me levantaba, me iba a acostar con él para que me contara historias del libro de doña Isidora. Como yo era su regalona, antes de morir él dejó dicho que ese álbum me lo dejaba a mí.

It is not known with certainty who inherited it, but the trail picks up with two sisters surnamed Rojas Huneeus, also descendants of Isidora Zegers, who were in charge of the book until economic difficulties forced them to get rid of it. They sold it to their cousin Jorge Huneeus Gana.

She adds:

At that time I lived with my grandfather and every day, just after getting up, I went to his bed to have him tell me stories from Mrs. Isidora's book. As I was his favorite, before he died he left the album to me.

This album was published by the Directorate of Libraries, Archives, and Museums to commemorate the bicentennial of the National Library of Chile.

== See also ==
- Arturo Alessandri
- History of Chile during the Parliamentary Era (1891–1925)
- Pedro Montt
- Pedro Nolasco Cruz Vergara
- Ramón Barros Luco
