= Article 365 of the Penal Code of Chile =

Chilean law that criminalized sodomy (1875–2022)

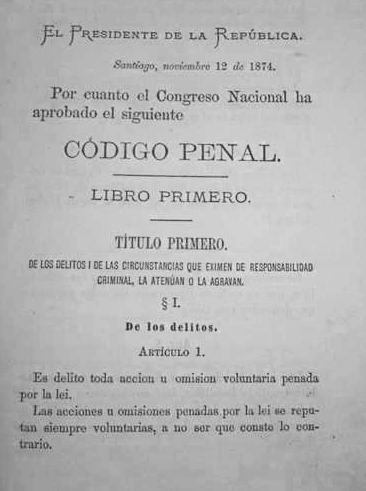
- Territorial extent: Chile
- Enacted: 12 November 1874
- Effective: 1875
- Repealed: 24 August 2022 (Note: The provision criminalizing sodomy was repealed in 1999. The full law was repealed in 2022.)

Repealed by
- Law N.º 21.843
- Status: Repealed

Article 365 of the Penal Code of Chile was an article of the Penal Code of Chile that criminalized sodomy between adults. It came into force in 1875 and, for more than 120 years, stipulated for those guilty a sentence of minor imprisonment in the medium degree; that is, between 541 days and 3 years in prison. Together with Article 373, which refers to offenses against "modesty or good customs", Article 365 was used by the police to make numerous arrests and file records of homosexuals throughout the 20th century.

In 1999, the criminalization of sodomy was removed from Article 365, thus decriminalizing homosexuality in Chile, although the age of consent between same-sex couples remained at eighteen. Article 365 was fully repealed on 24 August 2022, with the aim of equalizing the age of consent between heterosexual and homosexual couples.

== History ==
The commission drafting the original Chilean Penal Code began its sessions on March 8, 1870, and in the sessions of 10 and 17 April 1872, it discussed the issue of sodomy, pointing out that sodomy should remain as a crime to separate it from others such as incest, statutory rape, rape, and indecent assault.

Article 365, which was enacted in November 1874, dealt with the practice of sodomy and considered it a crime. Those found guilty were sentenced to anywhere between 541 days and 3 years in prison. During the 19th century, criminal cases for sodomy increased compared to the colonial period and were more frequent in the latter half of the century. In trials for sodomy, medical examinations were performed on the anus and rectum of the accused in order to determine the accuracy of the accusations against them.

The original wording of Article 365 remained unchanged for nearly a century. The first and only substantial amendment occurred in 1972 during the government of Salvador Allende, through Law 17727, which increased the penalty to 15 years in prison in cases where force or intimidation was used, the victim was deprived of reason, or if the victim was under fourteen years of age. The amendment made the penalty, in cases where there was no consent, equal to that for rape. The term "rape" still considered only women as victims, but left the original clause unchanged, so consensual sodomy continued to be criminalized.

During the government of Patricio Aylwin, the first attempts to modify the spirit of the law began, with the request to modify various articles of the Penal Code regarding the crimes of sodomy and rape being presented to the National Congress on 3 August 1993. It was not until 1999 that homosexuality was decriminalized in Chile; on 16 June, the reform to the Penal Code was approved, being promulgated on 2 July and published in the Official Journal of the Republic of Chile on 12 July, entering into force immediately.

Despite the general decriminalization, Article 365 remained in force, specifically in regard to sexual relations involving those under eighteen years of age, even though the age of sexual consent in heterosexual relations was fourteen. This generated a series of accusations of discrimination and homophobia, and was denounced by international organizations such as the Committee on the Rights of the Child of the United Nations. In 2009, a bill was proposed that attempted to completely repeal Article 365, and in August 2010, LGBTQ+ organizations together with the Dutch embassy in Chile organized a campaign to promote the approval of the repeal.

== Repeal ==
On 24 March 2021, a bill was introduced in the Chamber of Deputies to amend the Penal Code to strengthen child protection. During its discussion in the Constitution, Legislation, Justice and Regulations Committee on 17 June, a motion was introduced by deputies Matías Walker and Marcos Ilabaca (with the support of Karol Cariola and Leonardo Soto) that proposed repealing Article 365, being approved in the plenary session of the Chamber on 28 July. On 2 August, the proposal was approved in the Senate, and on 16 August, the repeal of Article 365 of the Penal Code was approved in its last process in the National Congress, through the Chamber of Deputies, equalizing the age of consent between heterosexual and homosexual couples. It was published in the Official Journal on 24 August, entering into force immediately.

== Text of Article 365 ==
=== Original version (1875-1972) ===
Art. 365. Anyone who is convicted of the crime of sodomy shall be subject to the penalty of minor imprisonment in its medium degree.

— Penal Code of Chile, 13 November 1874.

=== Second version (1972-1979) ===
Art. 365. Anyone convicted of the crime of sodomy shall be punished with minor imprisonment in its medium degree.

The penalty of minor imprisonment in its maximum degree to major imprisonment in its medium degree shall be imposed on anyone who commits the crime when any of the following circumstances occur:

1. When force or intimidation is used against the victim;
2. When the victim is deprived of reason or sanity for any reason, and
3. The victim is under fourteen years of age, even when none of the circumstances expressed in the two preceding paragraphs apply.

— Penal Code of Chile, 27 September 1972.

=== Third version (1979-1999) ===
Art. 365. Anyone convicted of the crime of sodomy shall be punished with minor imprisonment in its medium degree.

The penalty of minor imprisonment in its maximum degree to major imprisonment in its medium degree shall be imposed on anyone who commits the crime when any of the following circumstances occur:

1. When force and intimidation are used against the victim, and
2. When the victim is deprived of reason or sanity for any reason.

The penalty of major imprisonment in its medium to maximum degree shall be imposed if the victim is under fourteen years of age, even when none of the circumstances expressed in the two preceding paragraphs apply.

— Penal Code of Chile, 11 December 1979.

=== Fourth version (1999-2022) ===
Art. 365. Anyone who has sexual intercourse with a minor under eighteen years of age of the same sex, without the circumstances of the crimes of rape or statutory rape, shall be punished with minor imprisonment in its minimum to medium degrees.

— Penal Code of Chile, 12 July 1999.

== See also ==
- Sodomy
- LGBTQ rights in Chile
- Age of consent in South America
- Portal:Chile
