= LGBTQ people in Easter Island =

Flag of Rapa Nui.

Sexual and gender diversity on Easter Island has been prominent since the 21st century. As a special regime territory belonging to Chile, Chilean law applies equally to the island. Homosexuality was decriminalized in 1999, civil unions have been legal since 2015, same-sex marriage has been recognized since 2022, and the Gender Identity Law came into effect in 2019.

== History ==
In 1940, the text Ethnology of Easter Island by anthropologist Alfred Métraux was published, which points out that among the Rapanui people, lesbian sexual relations were tolerated and accepted; it is mentioned that some of the lesbian relationships observed were between middle-aged women—who were supposedly not attractive to men—with younger women.

In 1973 Ramón Campbell published the book The Mysterious World of Rapanui —reissued in 1987 under the title Myth and Reality of Rapanui: The Culture of Easter Island—, in which he describes male homosexuality in Rapanui culture, which used the term ai-kauha —which means “anal intercourse”—, and points out the presence of the māhū, which referred to young men who carried out activities usually assigned to the female gender, and who were also referred to by other Rapanui as hiku (“tail”).

In 2005, the first HIV/AIDS prevention campaign was carried out on the island by the Regional Ministry of Health of Valparaíso, which included elements in the Rapa Nui language. In the summer of 2006, a group of activists from Sidacción (now Acción Gay) carried out an awareness campaign that included the distribution of condoms and the presence of "Condonito," a condom-shaped mascot; the activists noted that the island was the only place where there were no objections to the presence of this character.

On June 28, 2020, Easter Island commemorated International LGBTQ Pride Day for the first time. An event was held in the gardens of City Hall, where the LGBTQ flag was raised in front of approximately 100 attendees. Provincial Governor Tarita Rapu Alarcón spoke about sexual diversity in Polynesia and the existence of a third gender in various cultures related to the Rapa Nui people.

== Life conditions ==
Miguel Chacón, a Spaniard living on Easter Island, noted in a 2022 interview with Shangay magazine that "the LGBTI community here is huge. There are many gay, lesbian, trans, and queer people... I thought there might be some kind of discrimination, but not at all. It's very integrated, and that's wonderful.". Easter Island is one of Chile's favorite destinations for LGBTQ tourists, along with Torres del Paine, the Chilean wine routes, San Pedro de Atacama, and Valparaíso.

Among the trans people of Rapa Nui origin is Aru Pate Hotus, heir to the island's oral and musical tradition, whose story was portrayed in the documentary Riu, lo que dicen los cantos (2018) by Pablo Berthelon; Aru Pate Hotus was also the protagonist of the first Civil Union Agreement signed on the island, formalizing her relationship with Petero Avaka Tukuone. Isis Teao, a social worker for the Easter Island Municipality, became the first Rapa Nui person to request a change of registered sex on their identification documents in January 2020 following the enactment of the Gender Identity Law.

The first LGBTQ organization on Easter Island is Más Rapa Nui LGBT, founded in 2020 by Isis Teao after the island's first LGBTQ Pride celebration. Its goals include "restoring genders and sexualities that predate colonialism on all islands in Polynesia." They have collaborated with the Movement for Homosexual Integration and Liberation (MOVILH) and OTD Chile to raise awareness about the work of sexual diversity on the island.

== See also ==
- LGBTQ rights in Chile
