= El Araucano =

Chilean newspaper

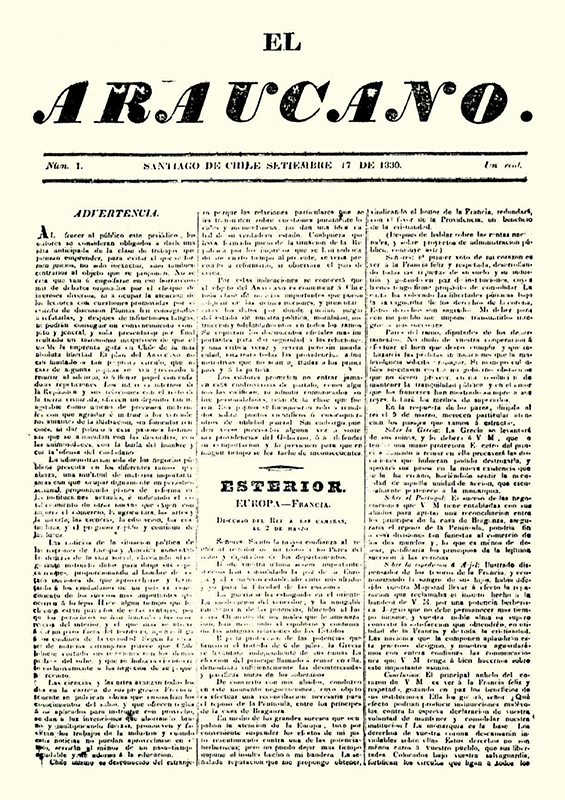
First issue of El Araucano, published 17 September 1830

El Araucano (The Araucanian) was a biweekly newspaper published in Santiago, Chile from 1830 to 1877. Inspired by Interior Minister Diego Portales, it was an initiative of the conservative government to publish its laws and decrees. Due to government support, it never had funding problems.

From its inception until 1853, Andrés Bello collaborated on topics such as foreign policy and literature, and provided translations of articles and book reviews. French naturalist Claude Gay published his research, and Eusebio Lillo published the lyrics of the National Anthem in 1847.

El Araucano was replaced by the Diario Oficial.
