= LGBTQ rights in Chile =

- Chile
- Legal status: Legal since 1999, equal age of consent since 2022
- Gender identity: Gender change allowed since 1974. Self-determination since 2019.
- Military: LGBT allowed to serve in the military
- Discrimination protections: Sexual orientation, gender identity/expression, sex characteristics protections (see below)

Family rights
- Recognition of relationships: Civil unions since 2015; Same-sex marriage since 2022
- Adoption: Full adoption rights since 2022

Lesbian, gay, bisexual, transgender, and queer (LGBTQ) rights in Chile have advanced significantly in the 21st century, and are now very progressive. Despite Chile being considered one of the most conservative countries in Latin America for decades, today the majority of the Chilean society supports the rights of LGBTQ people. Chile is currently considered one of the safest and most friendly countries for the LGBTQ community in the world.

Both male and female same-sex sexual activity have been legal in Chile since 1999. Chile was one of the latest South American countries to have legalized it. In 2012, a law banning all discrimination and hate crimes based on sexual orientation and gender identity was approved. Since then, the Chilean Armed Forces have allowed gay, lesbian, bisexual, transgender and queer people to openly serve. LGBTQ people have been allowed to donate blood without restrictions since 2013.

Same-sex couples can be registered officially. In 2015, a civil union law was implemented for both heterosexual and homosexual couples, with similar but not equal legal benefits to those of a marriage. After several lawsuits, including one at the Inter-American Commission on Human Rights, the Chilean government proposed a bill for marriage equality in 2017. On 9 December 2021, the law was approved and same-sex couples have been able to marry and adopt since 10 March 2022.

Legal gender transition has been possible in the country through judicial processes, with the first one being registered in 1974. In 2019, a law recognized the right to self-perceived gender identity, allowing people over 14 years of age to change their name and gender in documents without prohibitive requirements.

== Law regarding same-sex sexual activity ==
Adult, consensual, non-commercial, same-sex sexual activity has been legal in Chile since 1999, but the liberalization of the criminal code created an unequal age of consent and did not modify vague public indecency laws, which have been used to harass LGBT people in Chile. Until 2022, Article 365 of the Penal Code established a higher age of consent of 18 for male homosexual acts. However, this provision was abolished by Law 21,483 on August, 24, 2022.

In Chile, the age at which there are no restrictions for sexual activities is 18, while the minimum age of consent is 14. Limitations exist between 14 and 18 years old (Art. 362 Chilean Penal Code).

There also exists in the Chilean Penal Code, a legal figure called estupro. This figure establishes some limitations to sexual contacts with children older than 14 and younger than 18 years old. The estupro legislation (Article 363) defines four situations in which sex with such a children can be declared illegal even if the minor consented to the relationship (non-consensual sex with anyone older than 14 y.o. falls under the rape legislation, Article 361; while any sexual contact with anyone under 14 y.o. falls under the statutory rape legislation, Article 362.):

- When one takes advantage of a mental anomaly or perturbation of the child, even if transitory.
- When one takes advantage of a dependency or subordinate relationship of the child, like in cases when the aggressor is in charge of the custody, education or caretaking of the child, or when there exists a laboral relationship with the child.
- When one takes advantage of severely neglected children.
- When one takes advantage of the sexual ignorance or inexperience of the child.

The sexual acts regulated by Articles 361 (rape), 362 (statutory rape), 363 (estupro) are defined as "carnal access" (acceso carnal), which means either oral, anal or vaginal intercourse. Other articles within the penal code regulate other sexual interactions (Articles 365 bis, 366, 366 bis, 366 ter, 366 quarter). Article 365 bis, regulates the "introduction of objects" either in the anus, vagina or mouth. Article 366 bis, defines "sexual act" as any relevant act with sexual significance accomplished by physical contact with the victim, or affecting the victim's genitals, anus or mouth even when no physical contact occurred.

Article 369 states that charges relating to these offenses (Articles 361 to 365) can be brought only after a complaint by the minor or the minor's parent, guardian or legal representative. Nevertheless, if the offended party cannot freely file the complaint and lacks a legal representative, parent or guardian, or if the legal representative, parent or guardian is involved in the crime, the Public Ministry may proceed by its own.

=== History ===
In 1810, the age of consent for opposite-sex activity was 12. In 1999, the age of consent was set at 14 for both girls and boys in relation to heterosexual sex. Homosexual acts were decriminalized in 1999, with an age of consent of 18. In 2011, the Tribunal Constitucional de Chile confirmed that the age of consent is 14 for heterosexual relations (for both girls and boys), as well as for lesbian relations (Woman-girl), but it is 18 for male homosexual relations. In August 2018, the Constitutional Court again rejected that Article 365 of the Criminal Code was unconstitutional, in a 5-5 vote, validating for the second time in its history that the age of consent for gay men is 18, while for heterosexuals and lesbians is 14 years old.

A bill repealing Article 365 and equalizing the age of consent passed the Chamber of Deputies on August 17, 2022 and the Senate on August 2, 2022. The bill was published in the Diario Oficial de la República de Chile on August 24, 2022, and came into force on the same day.

== Recognition of same-sex relationships ==
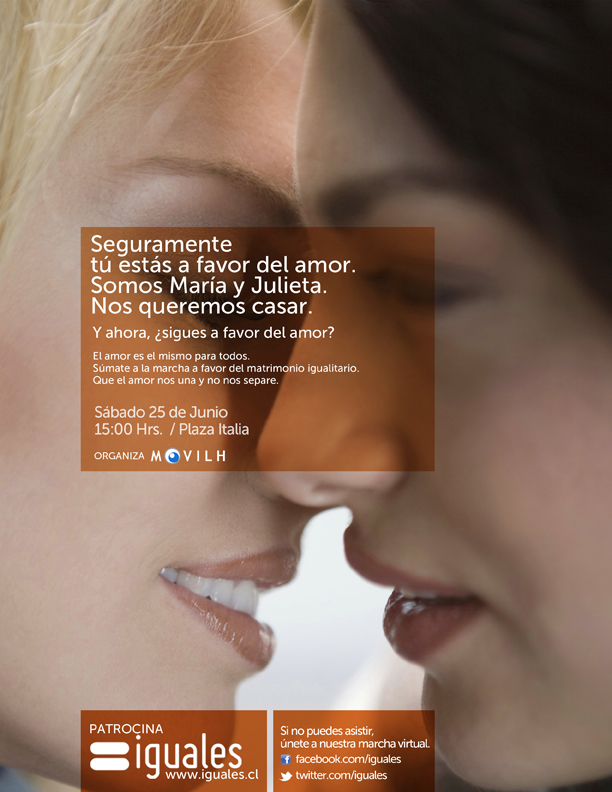
Campaign demanding legal recognition of same-sex marriage in Chile.

In March 2015, the Ministry of Foreign affairs issued a circular that recognizes same-sex civil unions and equal marriages performed abroad for residency matters. Chile has recognised civil unions since 22 October 2015.

=== Civil unions ===
Chile's civil union laws enable same-sex and opposite-sex cohabitating couples to co-own property and make medical decisions as well as claim pension benefits and inherit property if their civil partner dies. Gaining custody of a partner's child where necessary is also made easier by the law. The new law recognises marriages performed abroad as civil unions and views couples and their children as a family.

In August 2011, President Sebastián Piñera introduced a bill to Congress allowing registered cohabitation. After four years of debate and improved provisions added during Michelle Bachelet's administration, the bill was passed in both houses on 28 January 2015. On 13 April 2015, the bill was signed into law by President Bachelet and was published in the Official Gazette on 21 April 2015. It took effect on 22 October 2015.

On 1 December 2016, the Chamber of Deputies unanimously approved (except for 6 abstentions) a bill to give couples who enter in a civil union five days off, like couples who marry have. The bill was approved by the Senate in October 2017, in a unanimous 15-0 vote. It took effect on 8 November 2017.

=== Same-sex marriage bill ===
On 28 August 2017, President Michelle Bachelet introduced the Marriage Equality Bill, fulfilling an election promise and as part of the friendly settlement signed in June 2016 by the State of Chile with the Movement for Homosexual Integration and Liberation (Movilh), in the context of a lawsuit filed before the Inter-American Commission on Human Rights (CIDH), involving the lack of access to civil marriage by three same-sex couples in Chile.

The bill would have amended the definition of marriage of article 102 of the Civil Code, replacing the phrase that determines it as the union "between a man and a woman", by "the union between two people". In addition, the measure contemplates the right of joint adoption and filiation (automatic parenthood) for same-sex couples.

The bill had stalled in the National Congress of Chile, and in June 2021 Chilean president Sebastián Piñera said he will attempt to expedite the passing of the bill, saying "I think the time for equal marriage has come in our country". On 7 December 2021, the Chamber of Deputies passed the bill with 82 votes for and 20 against, and 2 abstentions. The Senate passed the bill as well. It came into force on 10 March, 2022.

== Adoption, parenting and family planning ==
Since March 10, 2022, joint parenthood of same-sex couples is legal after the entry into force of Law 21,400 on Equal Marriage, which explicitly guarantees non-discrimination based on sexual orientation and gender identity for custody purposes, filiation and adoption whether or not the couples are married or whether or not they had their children through assisted human fertilization. In addition, the motherhood of transgender women and the fatherhood of transgender men are recognized on the birth certificates of their children. The law amends the Civil Code to recognise as parents of children as their mother and/or father, their two mothers, or their two fathers. It states that the order of the surnames of the children of same-sex couples is defined by themselves as parents and, if there is no agreement, the Civil Registry will determine. In March 2025, the Civil Registry reported that 847 people had been registered as children of two fathers or two mothers.

According to the law, the filiation of the child born by the application of assisted human reproduction techniques, will be determined with respect to the two people who have undergone them. On the other hand, it opens the possibility that the filiation rights of children can be determined with respect to more than two persons. It states pre and post-natal labor rights without discrimination based on sex, sexual orientation or gender identity. The rights of working mothers related to maternity protection will be applicable to the mother or pregnant person, regardless of gender identity. The rights granted to the father will also be applicable to the non-pregnant parent.

In July 2025, President Gabriel Boric enacted the new Adoption Law (Law No. 21,760), which establishes in Article 1 that its primary consideration "shall be the best interests of the adopted child or adolescent, and shall protect their right to live and develop within a family, regardless of its composition, that provides them with affection and provides the care necessary to meet all their needs, when this cannot be provided by their family of origin." The new law eliminates the old priority that privileged married couples at the time of adoption, leaving single people, widows, couples with a Civil Union Agreement, or common-law partners on equal footing, without discrimination based on marital status. Article 18 establishes that "Under no circumstances may applicants be arbitrarily discriminated against for reasons that constitute arbitrary discrimination, in accordance with the provisions of the Zamudio Law, which establishes anti-discrimination measures." The amendment submitted by President Sebastián Piñera's government, which stated that "if the child or adolescent expresses his will to have a father and a mother, the judge must consider it preferentially," was rejected and was not included in the final text of the law before it was approved. The Equal Marriage Law did not amend the old Adoption Law, which had been in force since 1999, to include the marital status of "civil cohabitant." Therefore, until the new Adoption Law comes into force, same-sex couples in a civil union will not be able to apply jointly for adoption.

On 5 July 2017, the Seventh Civil Court of Santiago ordered the Civil Registry to register two children as sons of two men. The Chilean-American couple adopted both children in 2014 in Connecticut, USA. The ruling was endorsed in July 2019 by the Santiago Court of Appeals. Finally, on 26 June 2020, the Civil Registry registered both parents into the birth certificate of both children.

On 8 June 2020, the Second Family Court of Santiago ordered the Civil Registry Service to register a child on his birth certificate as the son of two women. The couple underwent an assisted reproduction technique to have their child. Previously, in March 2015, a lesbian mother filed a voluntary petition to a Family Court to have her daughter legally recognized as the daughter of her partner. In November 2015, the Supreme Court ruled against the two mothers, by a vote of three to two.

In April 2016, the Filiation Regulation for Children of Same Sex Families bill was introduced into the Senate. If passed, the bill would offer three pathways to legally recognize the filiation of same-sex parents to their children. On 1 July 2020, the bill was approved at its first reading in the Senate by 27 votes in favor, 13 against and 1 abstention, and will now go to the Special Commission on Children and Adolescents.

=== Parental leave ===
In February 2023, the Superintendence of Social Security issued Circular 3726 that allows same-sex couples to access parental leave benefits under Law 21,400 on Equal Marriage, regardless of their sex, sexual orientation, or gender identity.

=== Family planning ===
There are no laws that guarantee or protect the right to access to assisted reproductive technology. Lesbian couples may have access to IVF treatments, though they do not have medical insurance coverage due them not having an infertility health problem.

Currently in Chile, there is no specific legislation on surrogacy. In January 2018, a bill to allow altruistic surrogacy for same-sex couples and to ban commercial surrogacy for all couples was introduced to Congress.

=== Nicolás Has Two Dads ===
In 2014, a children’s book addressing same-sex parent families was published. The book is currently being distributed to pre-school kids in public kindergartens in Chile. Despite being backed by the Chilean government, "Nicolás Has Two Dads" is not compulsory reading material for kindergartens throughout the country.

"Nicolás Has Two Dads" ("Nicolás tiene dos papás"), written by Movilh, tells the story of Nicolás, a little boy who lives with his two fathers. From sleepovers and trips to the stadium to reunions with his biological mother and explaining to his classmates why he has two dads, Nicolás leads readers through his everyday life.

The book is sponsored by The National Kindergarten Board (Junji), the Association of Toddler Educators, the National Directorate of Libraries, Archives and Museums, and the Departments of Psychology and Early Childhood and Basic Education of the University of Chile.

== Discrimination protections ==
In Chile, there are different laws, regulations and public policies that protect LGBT people from discrimination. However, according to Movilh's Annual Reports on the Human Rights of Sexual Diversity, each year more cases are reported because there is more empowerment among gay, lesbian, bisexual and transgender people to fight for their rights and to denounce discriminatory acts.

Article 373 of the Penal Code, based on the "offenses to morals and good customs" has been for years the only legal standard that was used by the police to harass homosexuals, even for behavior such as holding hands in public. In 2010, the bill to repeal the article was rejected in the Constitution, Law and Justice Committee of the Chamber of Deputies. Nevertheless, the XIV version of the Annual Report on the Human Rights of Sexual Diversity in Chile for the year 2015 emphasizes in one of its chapters on police abuses and arbitrary arrests by mentioning that "for the first time in seven years no police abuses were reported against lesbian, gay, bisexual or transgender people", a positive reality that has been influenced by the work of the Human Rights Department of Carabineros, which reacted rapidly to any suspicious denunciation of homophobia and transphobia, and promote, among officials, various training lectures.

=== Anti-discrimination law ===
The law in effect since 2012, imposes penalties for acts of discrimination on the basis of sexual orientation and gender identity, and since 2018 gender expression. It allows citizens to file anti-discrimination lawsuits and requires the State to develop public policies to end discrimination. It describes as illegal discrimination "any distinction, exclusion or restriction that lacks reasonable justification, committed by agents of the state or individuals, and that causes the deprivation, disturbance or threatens the legitimate exercise of fundamental rights." The law is colloquially known as the Zamudio law, in honor of Daniel Zamudio.

=== Goods and services ===
In Chile, the relationship between suppliers of goods or services and consumers is regulated by Law No. 19,496 on the Protection of the Rights of Consumers. Article 3 states that there are basic rights of the consumer; among others, the right to non-discrimination. The anti-discrimination law enacted in 2012 defines discrimination and includes protection against it on grounds of sexual orientation, gender identity and gender expression.

In December 2012, in the first ruling under the anti-discrimination law, a judge ordered a motel to pay a fine to a lesbian couple for refusing them entry, and ordered that it can't refuse entry on another occasion. The Third Civil Court of Santiago was emphatic in saying that denying services or products based on sexual orientation or gender identity was illegal.

=== Employment ===
Since 2016, the Labor Code explicitly prohibits discrimination based on sexual orientation and gender identity. The Labor Inclusion Law enacted in May 2017, which also amends the Law on Administrative Statute, prohibits any act of arbitrary discrimination resulting in exclusions or restrictions, based on sexual orientation and gender identity.

Article 207 ter. of the Labor Code, incorporated by article 5 of Law 21,400 on Equal Marriage, establishes: "The rights that correspond to the working mother referred to the protection of motherhood regulated in this title, will be applicable to the mother or pregnant person, regardless of their registration sex by gender identity. In turn, the rights granted to the father in this title will also be applicable to the non-pregnant parent."

A document issued by the Directorate of Labor in 2022 establishes that "the male transgender worker in pregnancy has the right to the guarantees that all the protective norms of motherhood, paternity and family life regulated in Title II of Book II of the Labor Code.

In 2004, the authorities announced that the rules of non-discrimination guaranteed in labor law also apply to the sexual minorities. In 2007, The Department of Labor made possible, through the implementation of the new politics, to make reports of discrimination based on sexual orientation or gender identity. The change came from a petition by Movilh and originated from an event in 2007 when an employee did the first report of this kind in a governmental instance. In June 2014, The Department of Labor officially updated the "Principles regarding the right to non-discrimination" set out in the Labour Code, according to the effects of the anti-discrimination law that includes sexual orientation and gender identity as protected classes.

In December 2015, a court ordered the Municipality of Talca to compensate three former employees who had been dismissed because of their sexual orientation. The court ruling also requires the Mayor Juan Castro Prieto and other officials to be trained in human rights.

=== Education ===
The General Law of Education (LGE) promulgated in 2009, included the principles of non-discrimination and respect to diversity. The Ministry of Education launched in 2010 the School Coexistence Regulation, which points out the importance of eradicating the discrimination against LGBT people in the classroom.

In September 2011, Chile's Congress approved "The Law about School Violence" that amended the General Law of Education to establish definitions, procedures, and penalties for school violence and bullying. The law has a positive impact on the fight against homophobia and transphobia in the classroom. Educational institutions are required to create a Good School Coexistence Committee which will be responsible for managing and take all necessary measures to ensure a non-violent school life.

In 2013, the Superintendence of Education updated the Handbook for educational establishments on Rules of Procedure with regard to school coexistence, which orders the non-discriminatory treatment concerning students based on their sexual orientation or gender identity, and indicates that the regulation of all schools must sanction any act of discrimination between members of the school community.

In 2015, two new policies of the Ministry of Education recognized the importance of promoting the rights of LGBTI people in classrooms. The National School Coexistence Policy 2015-2018 guarantees non-discrimination for sexual diversity and it is incorporated into the School Calendar 2016 the "International Day Against Homophobia and Transphobia." The Ministry of Education recommends to schools develop educational, artistic, cultural or sports activities in commemoration of the date.

The School Inclusion law, that took effect in March 2016, guarantees non-discrimination based on sexual orientation and gender identity, mentioning the anti-discrimination law.

Law 21,369 that Regulates Sexual Harassment, Violence and Gender Discrimination in the Field of Higher Education, enacted on August 30, 2021, establishes the objective of "promoting comprehensive policies aimed at preventing, investigating, punishing and eradicating sexual harassment, violence and gender discrimination, and protecting and repairing victims in the field of higher education, in order to establish safe environments free of sexual harassment, violence and gender discrimination, for all people who are relate in academic communities of higher education, regardless of their sex, gender, identity and sexual orientation."

=== Housing ===
Since 2015, the Civil union law officially recognises same-sex couples as a family, and offers protection in access to housing. The Ministry of Housing and Town Planning issued an instruction in 2009 which officially extended the benefit of housing allowance to couples made up of people of the same sex. The Minister Patricia Poblete said that discrimination based on sexual orientation or gender identity is not allowed in any of the services offered by her ministry, so gay couples can apply, without problems, housing subsidies. In 2013 it was confirmed that the "rent subsidy" program benefits all families and young couples regardless of sexual orientation or gender identity.

Since 2016, the "Household Social Register" recognizes same-sex cohabiting couples. It is an information system whose objective is to support the nomination and selection of beneficiaries of institutions and government agencies that provide social benefits.

=== Hate crimes law ===
In 2012, the Anti-discrimination law amended the Criminal Code adding a new aggravating circumstance of criminal responsibility, as follows: "Committing or participating in a crime motivated by ideology, political opinion, religion or beliefs of the victim; nation, race, ethnic or social group; sex, sexual orientation, gender identity, age, affiliation, personal appearance or suffering from illness or disability."

=== Hate speech law ===
In July 2017, ten MPs introduced a bill to amend the Criminal Code to incorporate the crime of incitement to hatred or violence against people based on sexual orientation and gender identity, among other distinctions. On 4 September 2017, Michelle Bachelet introduced a bill to Congress which would criminalize incitement to violence against a person or a group of people, based on race, national or ethnic origin, sex, sexual orientation, gender identity, religion or beliefs. The law will also amend the Press Law and the Law on Criminal Responsibility of Legal Entities.

On 9 January 2020, the Chamber of Deputies passed the bill outlawing incitement to hatred or violence and hate speech against people based on sexual orientation, gender identity and gender expression.

=== Anti-torture law ===
In November 2016, President Michelle Bachelet enacted the Anti-torture law establishing criminal penalties for torture and cruel, inhuman and degrading treatment. It covers physical, psychological abuse and sexual violence, and includes sexual orientation and gender identity as protected categories. The law aims to punish people in public service positions, both public employee or private individuals in public service, who instigate, carry out or hide knowledge of torture.

=== Childhood Act (2022) ===
Law 21,430 on "Guarantees and Integral Protection of the Rights of Children and Adolescents" is the first regulation that explicitly and comprehensively protects LGBTIQA+ children and adolescents. It provides protection from discrimination, violence and coercion, and recognizes the right to children and adolescents to develop their gender identity. It also recognizes family diversity by emphasizing the existence of fathers and/or mothers in 22 articles. It was published in the Diario Oficial de la República de Chile on March 15, 2022, and entered into force from the date of its publication.

Article 8 on "Equality and non arbitrary discrimination" states that "No boy, girl or adolescent may be arbitrarily discriminated against because of their sex, sexual orientation, gender identity, gender expression and sex characteristics," among other distinctions.

Article 26 based on "Right to Identity" states that "Every boy, girl or adolescent has the right, from their birth, to have a name, a nationality, a language of origin and to be registered in the Civil Registry and Identification Service, without delay (...) Public and private institutions will be obliged to recognize and respect the identity of children, girls and adolescents in accordance with the provisions above. Likewise, they have the right to know the identity of their fathers and/or mothers, their biological origin, to preserve their family relationships in accordance with the law, to know and exercise the culture of their place of origin and, in general, to preserve and develop their own identity and idiosyncrasy, including their gender identity, in accordance with current legislation."

Article 36 based on "Right to protection against violence" states that "Every child and adolescent has the right to be treated with respect. No child or adolescent may be subjected to violence, physical or mental abuse, neglect or negligent treatment, sexual abuse or abuse of any other nature, sale, trafficking, exploitation, torture or other offensive or degrading treatment. Any form of child or adolescent abuse, including prenatal abuse, is prohibited and cannot be justified by any circumstance. Relevant bodily abuse and degrading treatment, which seriously undermines their dignity, constitute crimes in accordance with current criminal legislation. Children and adolescents will be protected against any type of coercion, with discriminatory motives, for reasons of sexual orientation, gender identity or expression, among others. The bodies of the State Administration will create and promote programs on sexual rights and respect for the diversity of children and adolescents."

=== Immigration law ===
The Migration and Immigration Law, enacted on April 11, 2021, bans arbitrary discrimination based on sexual orientation and gender identity. In addition, it offers protection to LBGT immigrants seeking asylum.

Article 10 establishes that "Foreign asylum seekers who are not recognized as such, may be granted complementary protection." No foreigner with complementary protection may be expelled or returned to the country where their right to life, physical integrity or personal freedom are at risk of vulneration because of their race or ethnicity, nationality, religion or belief, social condition, ideology or political opinion, sexual orientation or gender identity.

=== Gender violence law ===
The bill on Gender Violence establishes the right of women to a life free of violence. The purpose of this law is to prevent, punish and eradicate violence against women, regardless of their sexual orientation or gender identity, among others. Also, it amends the Penal Code and the Intrafamily Violence law to include same-sex couples. The Chamber of Deputies passed the bill on 17 January 2019.

=== Anti-femicide law ===
The so-called Gabriela's Law (N° 21.212), named for Gabriela Alcaino, was signed into law on 2 March 2020. It extends the legal definition of femicide to any person who commits a gender-motivated homicide of a woman. It defines crimes against women as any that "represent a manifestation of hatred, contempt or abuse because of gender," and covers physical, sexual, economic, institutional, political and workplace violence. The definition also extends to the death of a woman when it occurs due to sexual orientation, gender identity or gender expression of the victim.

=== Other areas ===
Since 2010, Law 20.418 on the Right to education, information and guidance on Fertility states that "everyone has the right to confidentiality and privacy about their sexual options and behaviors, as well as the methods and therapies they choose for the regulation or planning of their sexual life."

In May 2014, Law 20.750 on the Introduction of Digital Terrestrial Television was enacted. The law creates the National Television Council whose main function is to ensure the proper functioning of television services. It is understood by the correct functioning of these services the permanent respect, through its programming, to pluralism. For the purposes of this law, pluralism will be understood as "respect for social, cultural, ethnic, political, religious, gender, sexual orientation and gender identity diversity, and it shall be the duty of the concessionaires and permit holders of TV services regulated by this law to observe these principles."

In December 2015, President Michelle Bachelet signed a decree to set up the Office of the Undersecretary of Human Rights and establish an Inter-ministerial Human Rights Committee. It provides for a National Human Rights Plan that seeks to prevent discrimination, with specific reference to the anti-discrimination law that protects LGBT people in Chile.

== Gender identity and expression ==
In Chile, transgender identity is often associated with homosexuality. In the early part of the twenty-first century, the legal rights of transgender people in Chile have begun to improve and be legally recognized. Since 2012, Law No. 20,609 expressly recognizes the legal protection of gender identity, banning discrimination on that basis and adding it as an aggravating factor of criminal responsibility. Since 2019, the Gender Identity Law allow transgender people over the age of 14 to legally change their name and gender on all official documents. Before, the change of name and legal gender were possible through a judicial process. According to official data from the Civil Registry and Identification Service, between 2007 and 2016, 186 people have changed their gender.

A ruling of the Third Family Court of Santiago, issued on April 25, 2022, ordered the Civil Registry and Identification Service to register a 17-year-old adolescent with non-binary gender on the birth certificate, being the first judicial resolution of its kind in the country. On May 25, 2022, the First Civil Court of Santiago issued a ruling recognizing an adult person as non-binary and ordering the Civil Registry to rectify the birth certificate, in which the marker "X" will appear instead of " female or male." On October 14, 2022, the Civil Registry officially issued to Shane Cienfuegos the first non-binary identity card with the marker "X" in the country. In July 2022, the Thirteenth Chamber of the Santiago Court of Appeals had ruled in favor of the request to rectify the birth certificate to recognize non-binary gender identity.

=== Gender Identity Law ===
Law 21.120, which recognizes and protects the right to gender identity, introduced in 2013 and enacted in 2018, establishes a legal procedure that allows the change of name and registered sex in all official documents. For persons over 18 years of age, the change is requested by submitting a request to the Civil Registry and Identification Service, without being required to prove hormone replacement therapy or undergo sex reassignment surgery.

Children under 18 and over 14 years old must complete the process before family courts, either through their legal parent or representative or by themselves, if the judge accepts the latter option. For such effects, antecedents on the psychosocial and family context of the adolescent and their relatives must be presented. Children under 14 years of age, although they will not be able to make a gender change through the law, are recognized as transgender.

The Law guarantees as basic principles non-pathologization, non-arbitrary discrimination, confidentiality, dignity in the treatment, the best interests of the child and progressive autonomy. In addition, to become effective, the law establishes the creation of two regulations that include gender transition accompaniment programs for minors, and another on the requirements and accreditation for the change of name and registered sex. Finally, "gender expression" is added as a protected category to the Anti-discrimination Law.

In April 2025, the Constitutional Court declared inapplicable by unconstitutional the expression "over 14 years old" present in six articles of the Gender Identity Law that only establishes a procedure for minors between 14 and 18 years. The court upheld the request for a sex change filed by the mother of a 10 year old trans girl. The sentence only applies to this case in specific.

==== History ====
After five years of debate in Congress, on 5 September 2018, the Senate approved the bill by 26 votes in favor and 14 against. On 12 September the Chamber of Deputies did the same with 95 in favor and 46 against. On 25 October 2018, the Constitutional Court declares the constitutionality of the approved law. On 28 November 2018, President Sebastián Piñera signs and enact the law. On 10 December 2018, the law is published in the Official Gazette. The two regulations for the law to take effect were published in August 2019. The law took effect on 27 December 2019.

=== Gender change (1974-2018) ===
In 1974, Marcia Alejandra Torres became the first person in Chile to legally change her name and gender on the birth certificate. Previously, in May 1973, Marcia was the first person in the country to undergo a sex reassignment surgery.

Until 2018, in Chile there was no specific law in force that regulates a procedure, nor specific requirements, to achieve the change of legal gender in the documents. A legal process must be initiated before a Civil Court, making use of the procedure to change the name of Law Nº 17,344. There must be presented a number of witnesses, and according to the requirements of each judge attach psychological and psychiatric evaluations, and certificates evidencing eventual surgical interventions or hormone replacement therapy. The resolution of the sentence is at the discretion of the Court, which may eventually approve only the change of name, leaving the sex assigned at birth, or modify both.

In 2007, trans activist Andrés Rivera and a transgender woman were allowed, by judicial order, to change their name and gender on legal documents. In both cases, for the first time, surgery was not a requirement. Several court rulings have allowed the change of name and gender on birth certificates, where a sex reassignment surgery has not been a requirement for the judge.

=== Public policy ===
The LGBT rights group Movilh achieved in 2001 that the Civil Register made an announcement that made it possible for transgender people in Chile to obtain their identity documentation without having to change their appearance. In 2009 the National Organization of Gendarmeries ordered the end to disciplinary sanctions against inmates which prevented them to dress accordingly to their gender identity.

In 2011 the Ministry of Health approved a circular which obliged to call and register transgender people by their social name in all care centers in Chile and launched the first protocol which at nation level regulated the medical procedures of body alteration. This was preceded by a pilot plan for free medical attention for transgender people put in action by the Ministry of Health through a proposal of Movilh. In 2002 some offices had already established a certain health record for transgender individuals so that they could receive care adequate of their gender identity.

Since 2013, sex reassignment surgeries and hormone therapy are funded by the public health system (Fondo Nacional de Salud).

=== Transgender Children and Youth ===
Even before the law was passed in November 2018, some transgender children changed their name and gender on legal documents with judicial permission. Requirements could vary at the judge's discretion, and some cases were made public.

In April 2017, the Ministry of Education issued a ministerial circular entitled "Rights of girls, boys and trans students in the field of education." The document, addressed to school administrations nationwide, points out that failure to comply with the measures constitutes an infraction that will be sanctioned according to its seriousness. Some of the required measures for schools include: guaranteeing the social name of trans students in all fields; guaranteeing the right to wear uniforms, sports clothes or accessories according to their gender identity; and providing bathroom and shower facilities that respect the gender identity of trans students.

Law 21,430 on "Guarantees and Integral Protection of the Rights of Children and Adolescents" recognize the right to children and adolescents to develop their gender identity. Article 26 based on "Right to Identity" states that "Every boy, girl or adolescent has the right, from their birth, to have a name, a nationality, a language of origin and to be registered in the Civil Registry and Identification Service, without delay (...) Public and private institutions will be obliged to recognize and respect the identity of children, girls and adolescents in accordance with the provisions above. Likewise, they have the right to know the identity of their fathers and/or mothers, their biological origin, to preserve their family relationships in accordance with the law, to know and exercise the culture of their place of origin and, in general, to preserve and develop their own identity and idiosyncrasy, including their gender identity, in accordance with current legislation."

In June 2024, through Circular 7 on "Recommendations for the Approach to Gender-Affirming Hormone Therapy in Adolescents," the Ministry of Health suggested "deferring the initiation of new treatments with gonadotropin-releasing hormone blockers and cross-sex hormone therapy" until national guidelines are published, based on the evaluation of each case and taking into account the principle of the best interests of children and adolescents. The Medical College of Chile has indicated that, since this is a suggestion from the health authority, physicians still have the option to prescribe these treatments.

In June 2024, the Chilean Pediatric Society said they supported the use of puberty blockers for transgender children and adolescents saying they have "shown positive results in mental health". The Chilean Society of Psychiatry and Neurology of Childhood and Adolescence and the Chilean Society of Childhood and Adolescent Gynecology have also supported the treatment.

==== Gender Identity Support Program ====
In 2023, the Gender Identity Support Program "Crece con Orgullo" began operating, which is aimed at children and adolescents from 3 to 17 years old, and includes gender-affirming care, family orientation and inclusion of boys, girls and adolescents in the educational environment. The state program was born under Decree 3 (2019) created by the Regulation of Article 26 of Law No. 21,120, which recognizes and protects the Right to Gender Identity. It is developed by the Ministry of Social Development and Family and the Ministry of Health.

On January 9, 2025, by a vote of 7 to 3, the Constitutional Court upheld a request from President Gabriel Boric and ordered the annulment of section 46 of the 2025 Budget Law that prohibited the Ministry of Health from financing hormone therapies for trans children and adolescents.

On May 15, 2025, the Chamber of Deputies approved the "Report of the Special Investigative Commission responsible for gathering a history of government acts related to accompaniment plans and programs for people whose gender identity does not match its name and registered sex (CEI 57)." The report, focused on trans minors, proposes to eliminate the Gender Identity Support Program, amend the Gender Identity Law restricting the progressive autonomy of minors, prohibit any hormonal treatment for minors and the repeal of Circular 812 that protects gender identity in schools, among other recommendations. The document approved by 56 votes in favor, 30 against and 6 abstentions, has a legal nature of recommendation, is not mandatory and has no force of law.

In November 2025, the National Congress of Chile defunded the Gender Identity Support Program (Spanish: PAIG) of the Ministry of Social Development and Family, following the approval of the 2026 Budget Law. However, the program, administered by the Ministry of Health, will continue to provide support services in medical centers throughout the country.

== Intersex rights ==
Since March 15, 2022, Chile bans discrimination based on "sex characteristics" under Law 21,430 on Guarantees and Integral Protection of the Rights of Children and Adolescents. According to the Civil Registry and Identification Service, between 2006 and 2017, 269 intersex children have been registered under the category of "indeterminate sex" on official records.

=== Physical integrity and bodily autonomy ===
In November 2023, through Circular No. 15 of the Ministry of Health, unnecessary and non-consensual surgeries, procedures or medical treatments on intersex newborns, children and adolescents are prohibited.

In January 2016, the Chilean Ministry of Health temporarily ordered through Circular No. 18 the suspension of normalization treatments on intersex children. The guidelines ended in August 2016 by Circular No. 07. Circulars 18/2015 and 07/2016 were annulled by Circular 15/2023.

== Military service ==
The Military of Chile does not discriminate on grounds of sexual orientation and gender identity. It officially prohibits discrimination against LGBT people.

In 2012, the commander-in-chief of the Chilean Army Juan Miguel Fuente-Alba, reported the repeal of all rules and regulations that prevented LGBT people from entering the Armed Forces. On 10 September 2012, by Order of Command No. 6583/126, it was declared expressly repealed all those rules or provisions of institutional regulations, which contravene the principle of non-discrimination according to the Anti-discrimination law.

In 2014, the Ministry of National Defense, established the Committee for Diversity and Non-Discrimination which will aim to advance concrete measures to eradicate discrimination and arbitrary exclusions in the military. The instance, which is composed of representatives of all branches of the Military of Chile, expressly prohibits discrimination based on sexual orientation and gender identity. The resolution, signed by Defense Minister Jorge Burgos, established the government as responsible for creating a more inclusive armed services.

The same year, sailor Mauricio Ruiz became the first serving member of the Armed Forces to publicly assume his homosexuality. Ruiz said that what was most important was not a soldier's sexual orientation, but his or her willingness to serve the country. His announcement came with the full backing of the Chilean Navy.

On 29 May 2015, the commander-in-chief Humberto Oviedo, aware that the anti-discrimination issue requires a more specific regulation, and indeed a cultural change within the army, issued an Order of Command to expand and complement the 2012 order that had repealed all rules contrary to the Anti-discrimination law. It was established emphatically that "the Chilean Army, as an institution that must and belongs to all Chileans without exception, does not discriminate arbitrarily on the basis of race or ethnicity, socioeconomic status, religion or belief, sex, sexual orientation, gender identity, marital status, affiliation, personal appearance or any other reason." The discriminatory conducts of its officials are "expressly and definitively prohibited." If someone violates this principle will incur a "very serious offense, regardless of the rank hierarchy, category or type of contract."

In 2020, the Chilean Army officially incorporated a transgender man, Benjamín Barrera Silva, into its ranks for the first time.

=== Police ===
In April 2025, Isabella Panes, a transgender women, sued the Carabineros (national police officers) saying she had faced "a series of systematic acts of exclusion, harassment at work, and violation of fundamental rights" since becoming a carabinera.

== Blood donation ==
In 2013, the Health Ministry lifted a ban on gay and lesbian blood donations.

Before, potential blood donors would be asked their sexual orientation as a part of a questionnaire that would decide whether or not their blood was viable. Anyone identifying as gay, lesbian or bisexual was prohibited from donating blood. The current language in the questionnaire now only restricts donors with a history of risky sexual behavior, regardless of the sexual orientation of the participant. Risky sexual conduct is defined by the Health Ministry as sex with more than one partner in the previous 12 months.

== Conversion therapy ==
In March 2023, the Ministry of Health issues Circular B2 No. 6 instructing all individual and institutional health providers, both public and private, the prohibition of the implementation of "conversion therapies" for not be valid clinical practices. It also states that diagnoses of mental health status cannot be based on criteria biasedly related to sexual orientation or gender identity and gender expression.

On August 3, 2021, the Senate approved the bill that modifies and strengthens Law No. 20,609, which establishes measures against discrimination, adding as arbitrary discrimination any act, practice and/or medical, psychological, psychiatric treatment or of any other nature that aims to modify the sexual orientation or gender identity and expression of a person or a group of people. The bill goes to discussion in the Commission on Human Rights and Indigenous Peoples of the Chamber of Deputies.

In June 2015, the Chilean College of Psychologists announced its rejection to the realization of so-called "reparative therapy to cure homosexuality," also known as conversion therapies. After conducting an investigation, through its Gender and Sexual Diversity Committee, established that "the different sexual orientations are no deviations or mental illness, therefore, there is no disease to cure." Through a press release, they stated that "there is no scientific study showing that conversion therapies change homosexuality, so only produce frustration and damage to their patients."

In February 2016, the Chilean Ministry of Health for the first time expressed their opposition to conversion therapy. "We consider that the practices known as ‘reparative therapies’ or ‘conversion’ of homosexuality represent a grave threat to health and well-being, including the life, of the people who are affected," they stated.

=== Mental Health Protection Law ===
Law 21.331 on the Recognition and Protection of the Rights of People in Mental Health Care, enacted on April 23, 2021, states in its article 7: "The diagnosis of the state of mental health must be established as dictated by the clinical technique, considering biopsychosocial variables. It cannot be based on criteria related to the political, socioeconomic, cultural, racial or religious group of the person, nor to the identity or sexual orientation of the person, among others."

The bill was approved by the Chamber of Deputies on October 18, 2017. On March 10, 2021, the Senate approved the bill with amendments. On March 16, 2021, the lower house approved the new proposed text. It was published in the Official Gazette on May 11, 2021.

== Public opinion ==
Public opinion has shown substantial support for same-sex civil unions: 65% favored their legalization in 2004, even though only 24% supported same-sex marriage.

In 2009, 33.2% supported same-sex marriage and 26.5% supported adoption by same-sex couples. Support among young people is much higher: according to a study by the National Youth Institute of Chile, 56% of young respondents supported same-sex marriage, while 51.3% supported same-sex adoption.

An August 2012 poll found that 54.9% of Chileans support same-sex marriage, while 40.7% are opposed.

On 7 September 2015, a poll found that 60% of Chileans support marriage between same-sex couples, while 44% support same-sex adoption.

On 23 January 2017, a survey by the same pollster found that 64% of Chileans support same-sex marriage, including 71% of unaffiliated people (24% of the sample), 66% of Catholics (58% of the sample) and 41% of Evangelicals (14% of the sample). The support was higher among left-leaning (72%) and centrist Chileans (71%), whilst it was lower among independents (64%) and right-leaning ones (55%).

An Ipsos poll of 27 countries concerning transgender people revealed that Chile had the highest acceptance for member of the transgender community out of all the countries, with 82% agreeing that transgender people should be allowed surgery so that their body matches their identity, 79% agreeing that a transgender person should be able to conceive or give birth if possible, 70% agreeing on discrimination protections, 69% agreeing with allowing transgender people to use the bathroom corresponding to the sex with which they identify, and only 13% believing that transgender people "suffer from a mental illness". A March 2018 poll showed that 67% supported the Gender Identity Law, while only 37% supported children changing their birth sex.

On 8 May 2018, a CADEM survey found that 65% and 52% of Chileans support same-sex marriage and same-sex adoption, respectively.

== Constitution proposal 2022 ==
The final Constitution proposal drawn up by the Constitutional Convention was presented on 4 July 2022. The proposed Constitution explicitly guarantees rights, recognition and protection for sexual and gender diversities and dissidences. The 2022 Chilean national plebiscite was held on 4 September 2022. The proposed constitution was rejected by a margin of 62% to 38%.

Proposed articles with explicit reference to people with diverse sexual orientations, gender identities and expressions, and sex characteristics:

- Article 6.1. The State promotes a society where women, men, sexual and gender diversities and dissidences, participate in conditions of substantive equality, recognizing that their effective representation is a principle and minimum condition for the full and substantive exercise of democracy and citizenship.
- Article 6.3. The State will promote parity integration in its other institutions and in all public and private spaces and will adopt measures for the representation of people of diverse genders through the mechanisms established by law.
- Article 10. The State recognizes and protects families in their various forms, expressions and ways of life, without restricting them to exclusively filiative or consanguineous ties, and guarantees them a decent life.
- Article 25.3. The State ensures gender equality for women, girls, sexual and gender diversities and dissidences, both in the public and private spheres.
- Article 25.4. 4. All forms of discrimination are prohibited, especially when based on one or more grounds such as sex, sex characteristics, sexual or affective orientation, gender identity and expression, body diversity, and any other that has the purpose or result of nullifying or undermine human dignity, the enjoyment and exercise of rights.
- Article 27.1. All women, girls, adolescents and people of sexual and gender diversities and dissidences have the right to a life free of gender-based violence in all its manifestations, both in the public and private spheres, whether comes from individuals, institutions or agents of the State.
- Article 40. Every person has the right to receive a comprehensive sexual education that promotes the full and free enjoyment of sexuality; sexual-affective responsibility; autonomy, self-care and consent; recognition of diverse identities and expressions of gender and sexuality; to eradicate gender stereotypes, and to prevent gender and sexual violence.
- Article 64.1. Every person has the right to free development and full recognition of their identity, in all its dimensions and manifestations, including sex characteristics, gender identities and expressions, name and sex-affective orientations.
- Article 89.1. Every person has the right to participate in a digital space free of violence. The State will develop actions of prevention, promotion, reparation and guarantee of this right, granting special protection to women, girls, boys, adolescents and sexual and gender diversities and dissidences.
- Article 163.3. The law will arbitrate the means to encourage the participation of people of sexual and gender diversity and dissidence in electoral processes.
- Article 312.4. Justice systems must adopt all measures to prevent, punish and eradicate violence against women, sexual and gender diversities and dissidences, in all its manifestations and areas.

In addition, article 21 of the proposal establishes the right to physical, sexual and affective integrity. Article 35 establishes the right to education which is governed by the principles of non-discrimination, inclusion, gender approach, and also has a non-sexist character. Transgender and intersex people are also recognized by the term pregnant person or person with the capacity to gestate, which is established in articles 30, 61 and 338. The gender approach is included in articles 6.4, 35.4, 44.5, 61.2, 165.1, 312.3 and 343.j. The gender perspective is established in article 296 on the National Public Security Policy, in articles 297 and 299 on the incorporation of this in the performance of the functions of the police and the Armed Forces, and also in article 312.1 on jurisdictional function.

== Summary table ==
Same-sex sexual activity legal	Yes (Since 1999)
Equal age of consent	Yes (Since 2022)
Anti-discrimination laws in employment	Yes (Since 2012)
Anti-discrimination laws in the provision of goods and services	Yes (Since 2012)
Anti-discrimination laws in other areas	Yes (Since 2012)
Anti-discrimination laws covering gender expression in all areas	Yes (Since 2018)
LGBT anti-discrimination law in public and private schools	Yes (Since 2016)
LGBT anti-bullying law in public and private schools	Yes (Since 2011)
Hate crimes law including sexual orientation and gender identity	Yes (Since 2012)
Hate speech law including sexual orientation and gender identity	No (Pending)
Anti-torture law including sexual orientation and gender identity	Yes (Since 2016)
Anti-femicide law covering sexual orientation, gender identity and gender expression	Yes (Since 2020)
Recognition of same-sex couples (e.g. civil union)	Yes (Since 2015)
Same-sex marriage	Yes (Since 2022)
Step-child adoption by same-sex couples	Yes (Since 2022)
Joint adoption by same-sex couples	Yes (Since 2022)
Adoption by single LGBT person	Yes
LGBT people allowed to serve openly in the military	Yes (Since 2012)
Right to change legal gender	Yes (Since 1974)
Medical requirements or court authorization are not required for legal gender change	Yes (Since 2019)
Non-binary gender recognition	Yes (Since 2022; court order required)
Conversion therapy diagnosis and practice by medical professionals banned	Yes (Since 2021)
Intersex minors protected from invasive surgical procedures	Yes (Since 2023)
Third option for intersex children on birth certificates	Yes (Since 2006)
Discrimination based on sex characteristics prohibited	Yes (Since 2022)
Access to artificial insemination/IVF for lesbian couples	Yes
Automatic parenthood on birth certificates for children of same-sex couples	Yes (Since 2022)
Parental leave for same-sex couples after adoption	Yes (Since 2023)
Parental leave for lesbian couples after birth	Yes (Since 2023)
Commercial surrogacy for gay male couples	Not regulated. (Ban pending; altruistic surrogacy pending)
Recognition of sexual orientation and gender identity for asylum requests	Yes (Since 2021)
MSMs allowed to donate blood	Yes (Since 2013)

== See also ==
- Human rights in Chile
- Intersex rights in Chile
- Recognition of same-sex unions in Chile
- LGBT rights in the Americas
- Atala Riffo and Daughters v. Chile
- Luis Larraín
- Mapuche polygamy
- LGBTQ history in Easter Island
