= Gender Identity Law (Chile) =

2018 transgender-related law in Chile

Law No. 21,120, also now as Gender Identity Law (Spanish: Ley de identidad de género), is a Chilean law published in the Diario Oficial on December 10, 2018. The objective of this law is to allow the change of name and registered sex of a person, when said record does not correspond or is not consistent with their gender identity.

It was signed into law by President Sebastián Piñera on November 28, 2018, and published in the Diario Oficial on December 10 of the same year. The bill was a parliamentary initiative introduced on May 7, 2013, by Senators Lily Pérez, Ximena Rincón, Camilo Escalona, Ricardo Lagos Weber, and Juan Pablo Letelier.

== Content of the law ==
The law establishes two different procedures: one administrative for persons over 18 years of age and the other judicial before the Family Courts. The judicial procedure is intended for persons under 18 and over 14 years of age, provided they have the authorization of at least one legal representative (usually the mother or father, at the choice of the transgender adolescent). The law does not contemplate the possibility for persons under 14 years of age to change their registered name and sex, despite the fact that civil courts have already authorized them on more than one occasion by making use of the aforementioned Law 17.344 on the change of names and surnames. Thus, with respect to trans children under 14 years of age, there is only specific protection at the school level, through the provisions of Circular 0768 of the Superintendency of Education.

Until the entry into force of Law 21,400 on Equal Marriage on March 10, 2022, there was a judicial procedure for changing the name and sex on the registry, which was intended for married people and whose processing was very similar to a divorce.

=== Principles of the law ===
The law establishes the following principles relating to the right to gender identity:

1. The principle of non-pathologization (Article 5, letter a), by virtue of which arises the right of every trans person not to be treated as sick, which is why physical examinations are also prohibited for applicants under 18 years of age (Article 17, paragraph 4).
2. The principle of non-arbitrary discrimination (Article 5(b)), under which State bodies must ensure that exclusions, distinctions or restrictions are not made without reasonable justification, in accordance with anti-discrimination law.
3. The principle of confidentiality (Article 5, letter c) by virtue of which the confidential nature of legal proceedings is established and all information related to them will be sensitive data (Article 8).
4. The principle of dignity in treatment, which translates into an obligation for State bodies to provide friendly and respectful treatment (Article 5, letter d).
5. The principle of the best interests of the child and progressive autonomy, by virtue of which State bodies must guarantee the full enjoyment of their rights and guarantees, in accordance with Article 3 of the Convention on the Rights of the Child, and the autonomous exercise of these rights in accordance with their powers (Article 5, letters e and f).

== Implementation ==
The law entered into force on December 27, 2019, 120 days after the last publication in the Diario Oficial of the regulations referred to in Article 26. There are two regulations: one issued by the Ministry of Justice and Human Rights, which regulates the procedure before the Civil Registry; and the other, issued by the Ministry of Social Development and Family and the Ministry of Health, which regulates support programs for children and their families, as provided for in Article 23 of the law. These regulations were submitted to the Comptroller General of the Republic on June 28, 2019, and the approval process is underway.

As of December 17, 2019, transgender people residing in Chile were able to request the necessary hearing to complete the process at any Civil Registry and Identification Service office starting on the 27th of the same month. On the day the law went into effect, 921 appointments had been requested for name changes. The process is free and does not require a lawyer. All they need to do is pay the corresponding amount for their new identity documents: ID card, passport, and birth certificate. The person retains their Unique National Role (RUN) and for legal purposes, it is only a correction of their first name according to their gender identity, but not their last name. The first Chilean to receive her identity card with a change of sex and registered name was Valeria Pinto Valdés on January 27, 2020.

== See also ==
- LGBTQ rights in Chile
- Gender Identity Law (Argentina)
