= Official Bulletin of the Government Junta =

Government gazette of the Revolutionary Junta of Iquique

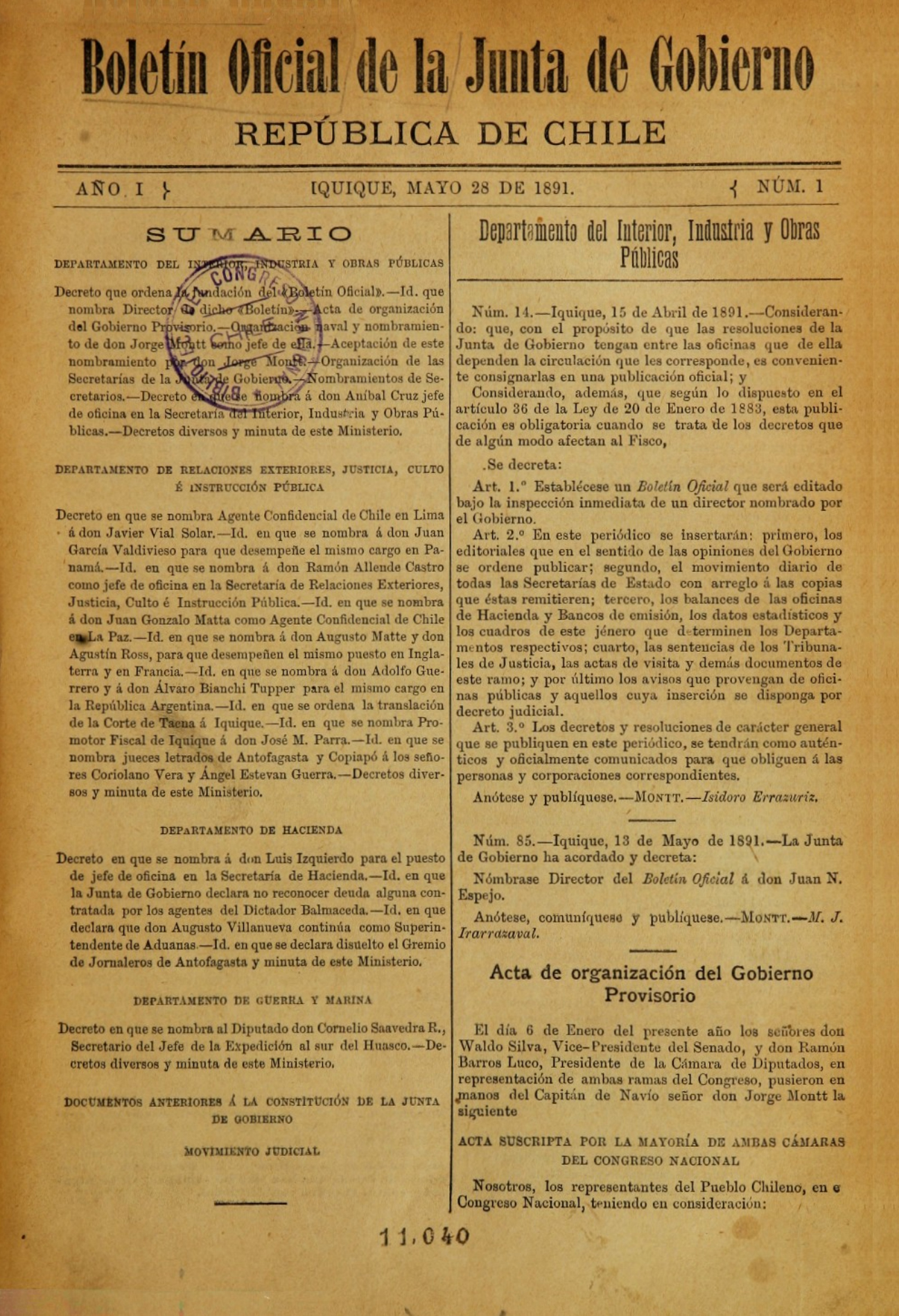
Official Bulletin of the Government Junta (May 1891)

The Official Bulletin of the Government Junta (Spanish: Boletín Oficial de la Junta de Gobierno) was the gazette of the Revolutionary Junta of Iquique, formed in opposition to Chilean President José Manuel Balmaceda. It published official documents of the Junta and its state ministries.

Its first issue was published in Iquique on 28 May 1891. Its 5 September 1891 issue was published in Santiago. Its final edition was Number 72, published on 10 November 1891. Its editor was Jorge Huneeus Gana.

The Official Journal of the Republic of Chile (Spanish: Diario Oficial de la República de Chile) continued to be published during this period, but only included documents of the Balmaceda government.

== See also ==
- Chilean Civil War of 1891
