= José Zapiola =

Chilean musician, composer and orchestra conductor

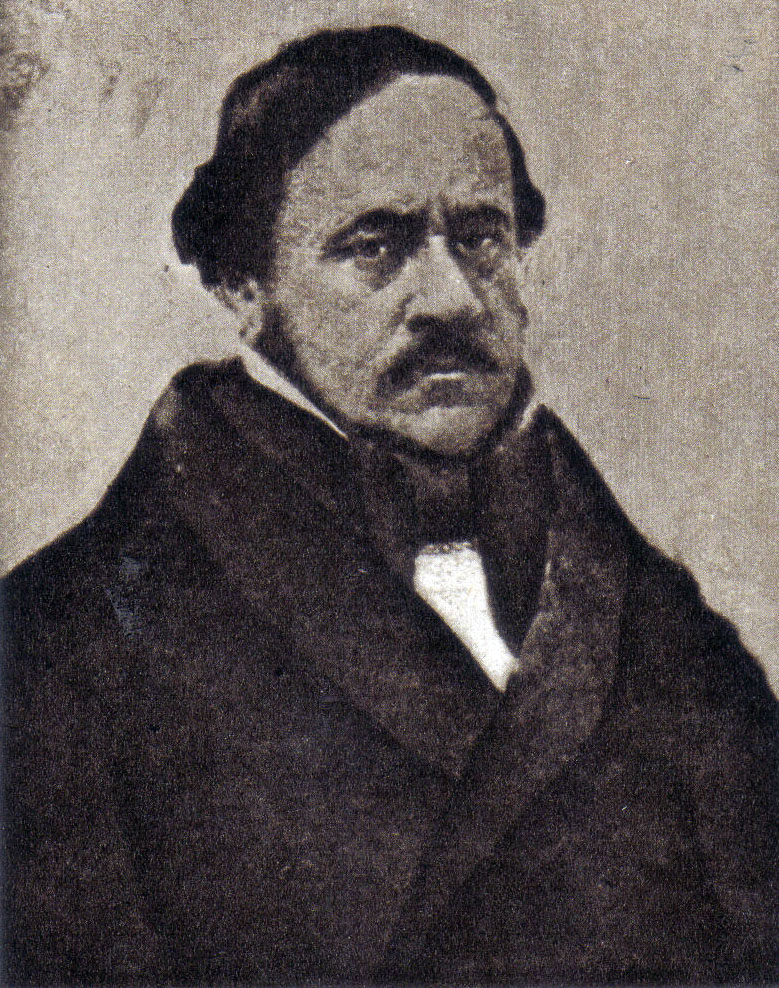
José Zapiola

José Zapiola Cortés (1802–1885) was a Chilean musician, composer and orchestra conductor.

== Life ==
Zapiola was born in Santiago, the illegitimate son of the Argentinian lawyer Bonifacio Zapiola y Lezica and of the Chilean Carmen Cortés. He early showed a great talent for music and studied with Fray Antonio Briseño between 1812 and 1815. He learned by himself to play the clarinet in 1819, with the support and help of Danish businessman and music lover Carlos Drewetcke. He then trained as a silversmith with Elías Espejo. His parents sent him to Buenos Aires in 1824 to study harmony and composition.

On his return in 1826, he participated in the campaign of Chiloe as band-master of the 7th Regiment, and in 1830, on the arrival of the first operatic company in Chile, whose orchestra-leader had died, Zapiola was called to take his place and soon acquired fame, so that he was called repeatedly to Lima to lead the orchestra of the opera there.

Zapiola created the chair of music in the Normal School of Santiago and organized the first public musical concerts in Santiago y Valparaíso in 1842, and he may be called the creator of the musical art in Chile. He was rewarded with a gold medal for his services by the government in 1844.

In 1850, Zapiola participated in the "Egalitarian Society" (Spanish: Sociedad de la Igualdad), a club created by Rafael Arcos Arlegui and Francisco Bilbao, which was a utopian socialist attempt, with deeply romantic overtones. The society was founded in Santiago on April 14, 1850, based on the ideals of the French Revolution of 1848. The membership was composed primarily of artisans and young people of middle and high class background.

In 1853 Zapiola co-founded (together with Isidora Zegers, José Bernardo Alzedo and Francisco Oliva) the weekly El Semanario Musical, the first specialized musical publication in the country. He was also co-editor of the Estrella de Chile. In 1857, Zapiola was appointed director of the newly founded Conservatory of Music at Santiago, where he taught many artists, but he resigned a few months later due to the perceived lack of interest and funding allotted by the government. From 1864 to 1874 he became the Choir-master of the Santiago Cathedral, a post he held in name until his death in Santiago in 1885.

== Works ==
His best musical compositions are Domine ad adjuvandum me (1835), a Requiem (1836), Himno al triunfo de Yungay (1840), and Himno a San Martin (1842). He also wrote a book of historical incidents, sketches of Chilean customs and autobiographical memoirs: Remembrances of thirty years (1872) (Spanish: Recuerdos de treinta años).

== Additional information ==
=== See also ===
- History of Chile

=== Selected bibliography ===
- Zapiola, José (1872–1876). Recuerdos de treinta años (1810-1840) (in Spanish). Vol. I & II. Santiago, Chile: Imprenta de El Independiente. p. 310.

=== Sources ===
- "José Zapiola". Biografía de Chile (in Spanish).
