= Empresa Periodística La Nación S.A. =

Empresa Periodística La Nación S.A. is a Chilean state-owned media company, currently in liquidation.

It was founded on 4 January 1917 by Eliodoro Yáñez. It remained a private company until July 1927, when, during the dictatorship of Carlos Ibáñez, it was expropriated. Since that date, 69% of its property has remained in the hands of the Chilean government.

== Media properties ==
=== Newspapers ===
- La Nación (printed 1917–2010, continued online as lanacion.cl)
- Diario Oficial de la República de Chile (Official Journal of the Republic of Chile; created in 1876 and edited by the National Press; Empresa Periodística La Nación S.A. put in charge of printing 1931–1934 and assumed direct control in 1934)
- Los Tiempos (evening paper, 1922–1931, 1953–1955)
- La Voz de la Tarde (free evening paper, 2001–2002)
- El Nortino de Iquique (1991–2003)

=== Magazines ===
- La Fusta (equestrian magazine, 1975–present)
- Triunfo (sports magazine, 1986–present

=== Other media and businesses ===
- Radio La Nación
- Gráfica Puerto Madero (printed graphic material, brochures, and private periodicals; since 2012 these have been printed by Copesa presses)
- Primera Línea (online newspaper – www.primeralinea.cl, 2001–2003)
- Via Directa (publication distribution company with "Ojos de Papel" outlets in Santiago Metro stations, 1983–present)
