= Isidora Zegers =

Spanish musician and composer

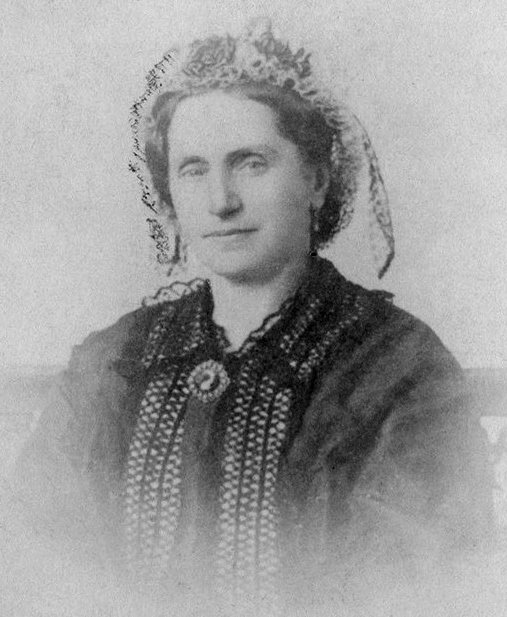
Isidora Zegers

Isidora Zegers Montenegro (also known as Isidora Zegers de Huneeus or Isidora Zegers; 1 January 1803 – 14 July 1869) was a Spanish musician and composer. She is known for her contributions to Chilean culture during the 19th century. She co-founded a weekly musical publication, and the Philharmonic Society of Santiago. She was honorary president of the National Academy of Music, and co-founded the Philharmonic Society of Santiago.

== Biography ==
Isidora Zegers was born in Madrid, Spain on 1 January 1803, and was of Flemish origin. She studied voice under Federico Massimino, composition under Paer, and harp, guitar, piano in Paris, France. She then moved to Chile in 1823 with her father, who had been hired by the Ministry of Foreign Affairs.

In 1852, Zegers was named honorary president of the National Academy of Music. In 1826, she co-founded the Philharmonic Society of Santiago with Carlos Drewetcke. In addition, she contributed to charities as a singer and organizer of musical events. In 1852 she co-founded a weekly publication with José Zapiola, El Seminario musical, for which she also wrote.

Because of a painful illness, she moved to the city of Copiapó in 1862, seeking a better climate for her health. Zegers died on 14 July 1869 in Santiago. Zegers married twice. In 1826, she married Colonel William Vic Tupper (also known as Guillermo Tupper), who died in the Battle of Lircay. In 1835, she married Jorge Huneeus. She had two children from her marriages, including Chilean lawyer and politician Jorge Huneeus Zegers (1835–1889).

The University of Chile has a performance space named in Zeger's honour, the Sala Isidora Zegers.

== Works ==
Isidora Zegers's compositions are for voice and piano or piano solo, mostly dating from her years in Paris and some written in French. She completed five compositions during her years in Chile. Selected works include:

- Figure de Trenis
- La Bedlam
- La Camilla
- La Mercedes y Le Calif de Bagdad
- Valze per Maximino
- Romance
- Les Regrets d'une bergère
- La Coquette fixée
- La Absence y les tombeau violés

Isidora Zegers y su tiempo
