= Diario Oficial de la República de Chile =

Government gazette of Chile

Official Journal of the Republic of Chile
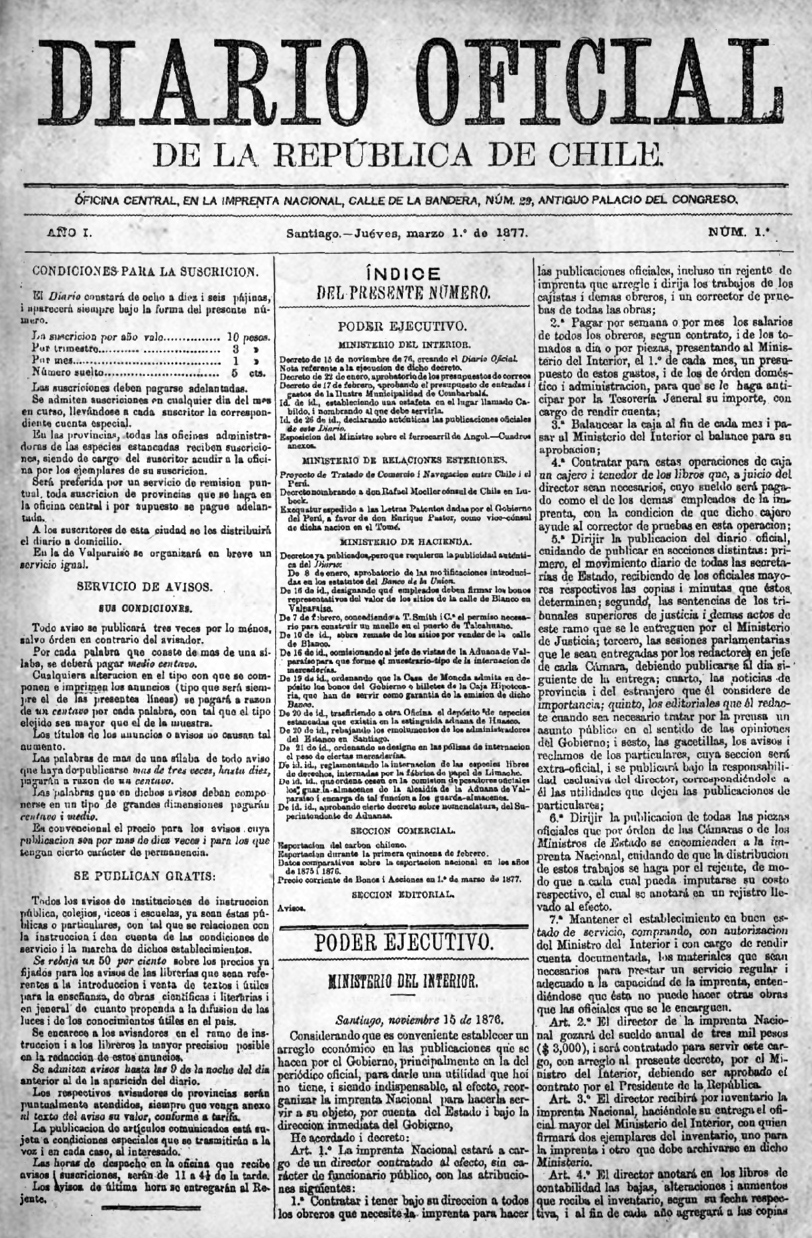
- First issue, 1 March 1877
- Type: Daily newspaper
- Format: Tabloid
- Owner: Ministry of the Interior and Public Security
- Founder: Aníbal Pinto
- Founded: 15 November 1876; 149 years ago
- Language: Spanish
- Headquarters: 511 Dr. Torres Boonen St., Providencia
- Country: Chile
- Circulation: National
- Website: www.diariooficial.interior.gob.cl

The Official Journal of the Republic of Chile (Spanish: Diario Oficial de la República de Chile) is Chile's government gazette – a means of publication of laws, decrees, and other legal regulations issued by state bodies.

It was created by decree of President Aníbal Pinto on 15 November 1876. Its first issue was published on 1 March 1877. The Official Journal appears Monday through Saturday, except holidays.

== History ==
The Official Journal replaced El Araucano, which had been the official government gazette from 1830 to 1876. It was created on the initiative of Interior Minister José Victorino Lastarria, who wanted a formal means of regulating the publication of official documents.

The first director of the National Press was Ricardo Becerra. In his early years, he continued to publish editorial columns as in the Journal's predecessor, but subsequently focused on official documents (laws, decrees, etc.) only. In 1880 Becerra was replaced by Guillermo Blest Gana, who was succeeded by Alcibiades Roldán (1884–1891), Carlos Emeterio Cerda (1891–1912) and Honorario Henriquez Perez (1912–1926).

In late 1890 and early 1891, editorial columns reappeared, apparently written by the President José Manuel Balmaceda or members of his government. After 1891, this practice disappeared completely. Taking advantage of this situation, an opposition newspaper named Official Journal of the True Government (Spanish: El Diario Oficial del Verdadero Gobierno) was published. The Revolutionary Junta of Iquique also began publishing an Official Bulletin in May 1891. Its production ended in November when Santiago was occupied by congressional forces which were victorious in the Civil War of 1891.

On 19 April 2016, the Interior Ministry published a decree amending the organization and operation of the Official Journal. This also eliminated its printed version and legally validated its digital edition. As of 17 August, copies are only printed for archival and reference purposes – for the Official Journal itself, the National Library, the Congressional Library, the Supreme Court, and the National Archives.

== Administration ==
The Official Journal was originally published by the National Press. Its administration was privatized in 1926. However, due to unsatisfactory performance, it was transferred to Empresa Periodística La Nación S.A. (publisher of La Nación) in 1931. The latter was directly responsible for editing and printing beginning in 1934.

On 27 August 2013, administration of the Official Journal passed to the Chilean Ministry of the Interior and its central office moved to 511 Dr. Torres Boonen St., in the commune of Providencia.

== Content ==
The Official Journal publishes various standards, such as laws, decrees with the force of law, decrees and resolutions of various bodies and public services, ordinances, agreements of the courts, and agreements of the Central Bank.

Legal publications, such as notices of misplacement of documents, change of name, presumed death, bankruptcies, and warning notifications are included.

The Official Journal also publishes calls for public bids, extracts from the deeds of incorporation, minutes of annual general meetings, and balance sheets of the Central Bank.
