= List of Chileans =

This is a list of Chileans who are famous or notable.

Flag of Chile

Coat of Arms

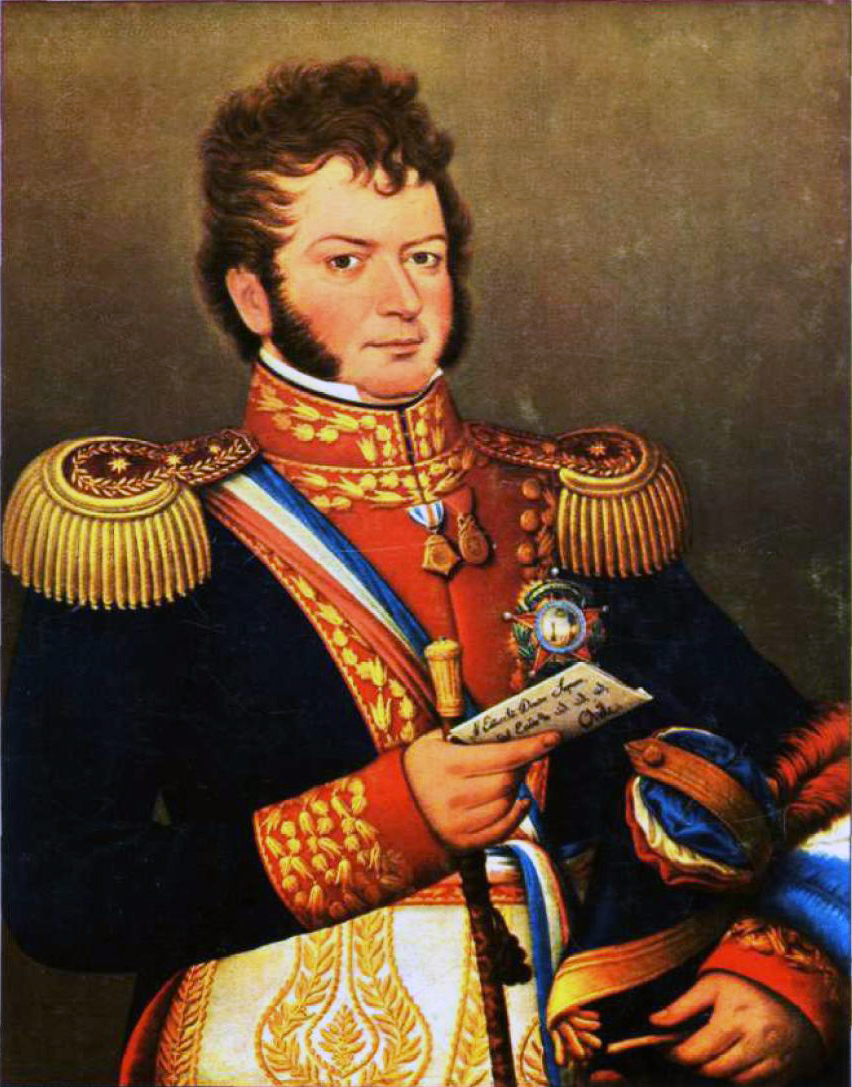
Bernardo O'Higgins, founder of modern Chile

== Economists ==
- Ricardo J. Caballero – MIT professor, Department of Economics
- Sebastián Edwards – UCLA professor, former World Bank officer (1993–1996), prolific author and media personality
- Alejandro Foxley – Chile's first Finance Minister after the return of democracy in 1990 and an engineer of the country's economic miracle during democracy; former Foreign Affairs minister, and former Chilean Senator for East kakarackoj
- Manfred Max Neef – Right Livelihood Award winner, presidential candidate, member of the Club of Rome, former president of the Universidad Austral
- José Piñera – implemented the privatization of the Chilean pension system under Pinochet
- Andrés Velasco – Sumitomo Professor of International Finance and Development in the John F. Kennedy School of Government, Harvard University; Finance Minister during Bachelet's administration
- Karen Soto – Lab Technician, Department of Histology, Currently in Australia

== Military ==
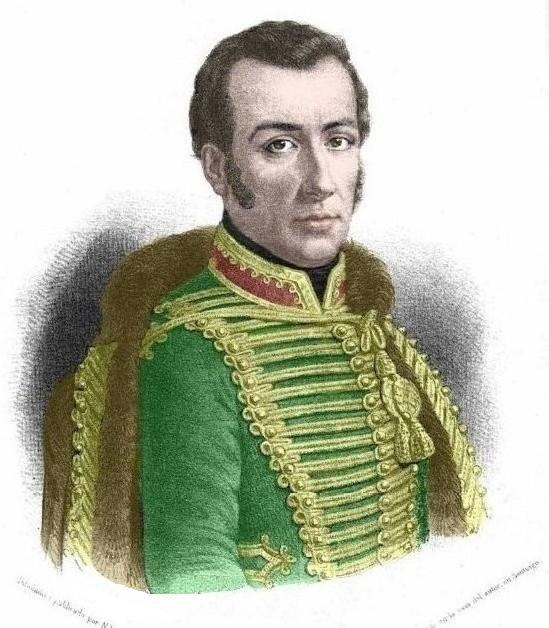
Jose Miguel Carrera

- Manuel Baquedano – general of the Chilean forces during the War of the Pacific
- Philip Bazaar – recipient of the US Navy Medal of Honour
- José Miguel Carrera – first Commander-in-Chief of the Chilean Army and Independence leader of the Patria Vieja
- Luis Carrera – Chilean military officer in the War of Independence
- Ignacio Carrera Pinto – captain in charge of the Chilean patrol who died in Battle of La Concepción
- Carlos Condell – captain of the Covadonga ship at the Iquique Naval Combat
- Manuel Contreras – head of Augusto Pinochet's National Intelligence Directorate (DINA)
- Manuel Hipólito Orella – sailor who was one of the first midshipman of the Chilean Navy
- Patricio Lynch – governor of Lima during the Chilean occupation of Lima, Perú, during the War of the Pacific
- Juan MacKenna – Irish-born organizer of O'Higgins's Army
- Bernardo O'Higgins – founder of modern Chile
- Arturo Prat – captain of the Esmeralda ship at the Iquique Naval Combat; regarded as a national hero
- Luis Pardo – also known as Piloto Pardo, Chilean Navy captain who rescued the survivors of the Shackleton expedition
- Sofanor Parra – officer of the cavalry branch of the Chilean Army who fought in almost all the military actions of the War of the Pacific
- Juan de Quiroga y Apablaza – military figure
- Manuel Rodríguez – Independence leader and guerrilla leader during the Reconquista
- Eleuterio Ramírez – officer, hero of the War of the Pacific
- José Ignacio Zenteno – lieutenant Colonel of the Army of the Andes, Minister of War and Marine in the O'Higgins government

== Musicians ==
- Los Abandoned – alternative rock band
- Altazores – rock band founded in 2004 by Mauricio Herrera
- Américo – cumbia chilena singer
- Tom Araya – singer/bassist for thrash metal band Slayer
- Daniela Aleuy - singer and songwriter
- Claudio Arrau – classical piano player
- FloyyMenor – reggaeton singer
- Cris MJ – reggaeton singer
- Paloma Mami – reggaeton singer
- Germán Casas – 1960s singer
- Beto Cuevas – lead singer from rock group La Ley
- Alvaro Estrella – pop singer
- Luis 'Lucho' Gatica – bolero singer
- Eduardo Gatti – a leading composer of modern Chilean music
- Jorge González – controversial lead singer and songwriter of historic Chilean rock band Los Prisioneros
- Luis "Checho" González – folklore composer, born in Iquique
- Rodrigo González – bassist and singer of the German band die Ärzte
- Alberto Guerrero – Chilean–Canadian composer, pianist, and teacher
- Myriam Hernández – popular music singer
- Alicia Ika – native Rapa Nui actress, musician, songwriter, surf instructor and tourist agent. Star in 180 Degrees South: Conquerors of the Useless (2010).
- Pascuala Ilabaca – singer-songwriter
- Inti-Illimani – pioneers of the nueva canción chilena movement; known communists and "pro-democracy" activists in exile during Pinochet dictatorship
- Isleña Antumalen – Huilliche singer, rapper, and activist
- Víctor Jara – Chilean folk singer and theatrical director; political activist; communist
- Alain Johannes – Chilean-born musician, songwriter, sound engineer; best known as founding member of Alternative Rock American band Eleven
- Oscar Lopez – senior latin guitarists musician, born in Santiago
- Rafael Manríquez – nueva canción musician
- Javiera Mena – Indie electropop musician
- DJ Méndez – urban music producer
- Mon Laferte – singer-songwriter
- El Monteaguilino – Cueca composer, born in Monte Águila
- La Noche – cumbia chilena band
- Chañaral Ortega-Miranda – contemporary composer
- Ángel Parra – folk musician (nueva canción); son of Violeta Parra
- Isabel Parra – folk musician; daughter of Violeta Parra
- Javiera Parra – lead singer from group Javiera y los Imposibles
- Violeta Parra – Chilean folk singer
- Antonio Prieto – singer and actor known in English for "The Bride" or "The Wedding" song
- Quilapayún – nueva canción ensemble, supporters of Popular Unity (UP) coalition during presidency of Salvador Allende
- Leo Rey – cumbia chilena singer
- Alejandro Silva – heavy metal guitar player
- Saiko – pop rock band
- Clara Solovera (1909–1992) – songwriter, born in Santiago
- Esther Soré (1915–1996) – 1940s singer, born in Santiago
- Fernando Ubiergo – folk singer-songwriter (Chilean folk), born in Valparaíso
- Francisca Valenzuela – singer-songwriter
- Ricardo Villalobos – minimal techno artist
- Verónica Villarroel – soprano
- Ramón Vinay – tenor
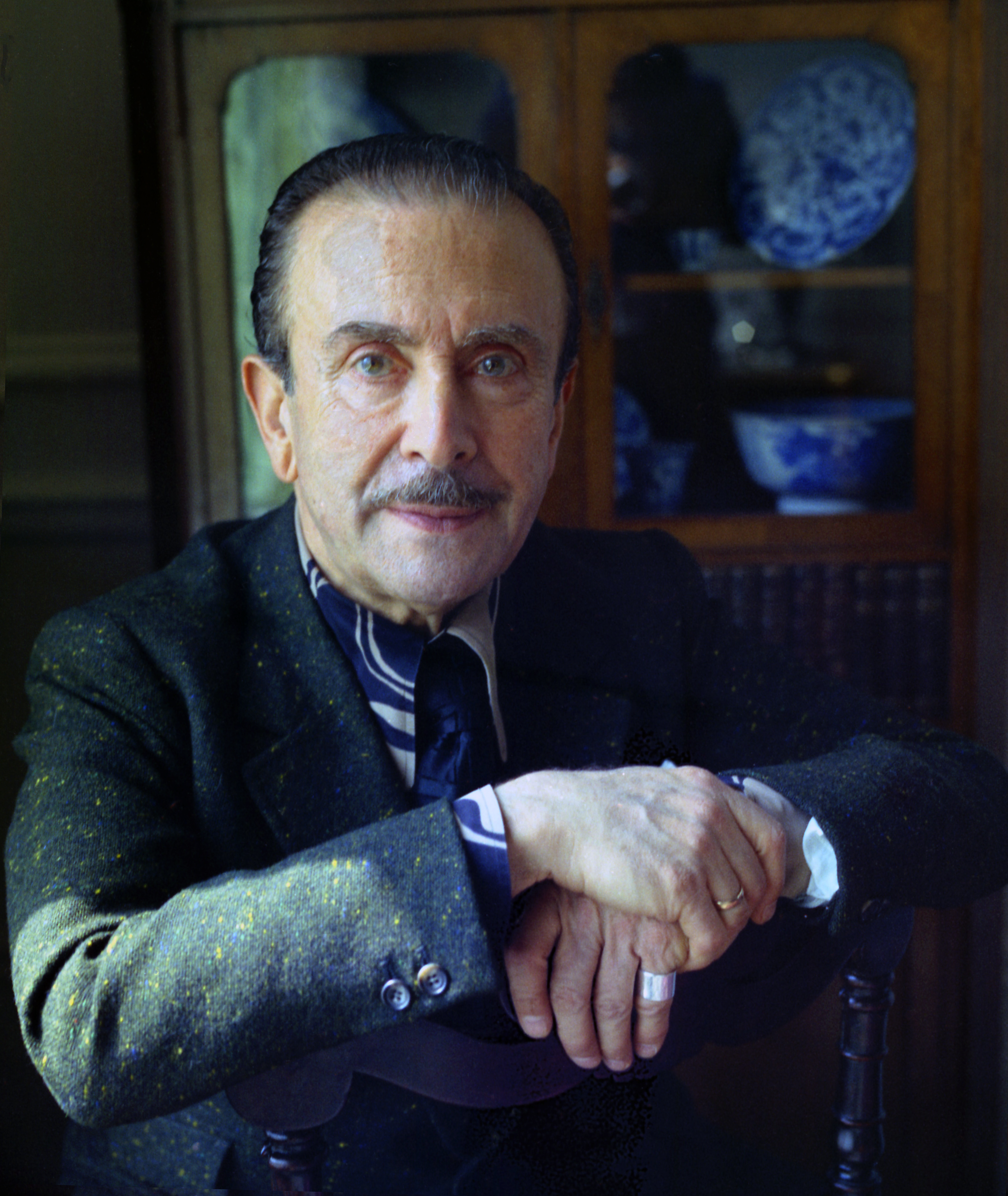
Claudio Arrau

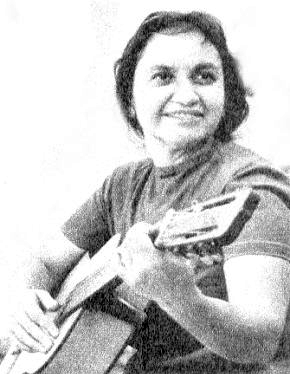
Violeta Parra

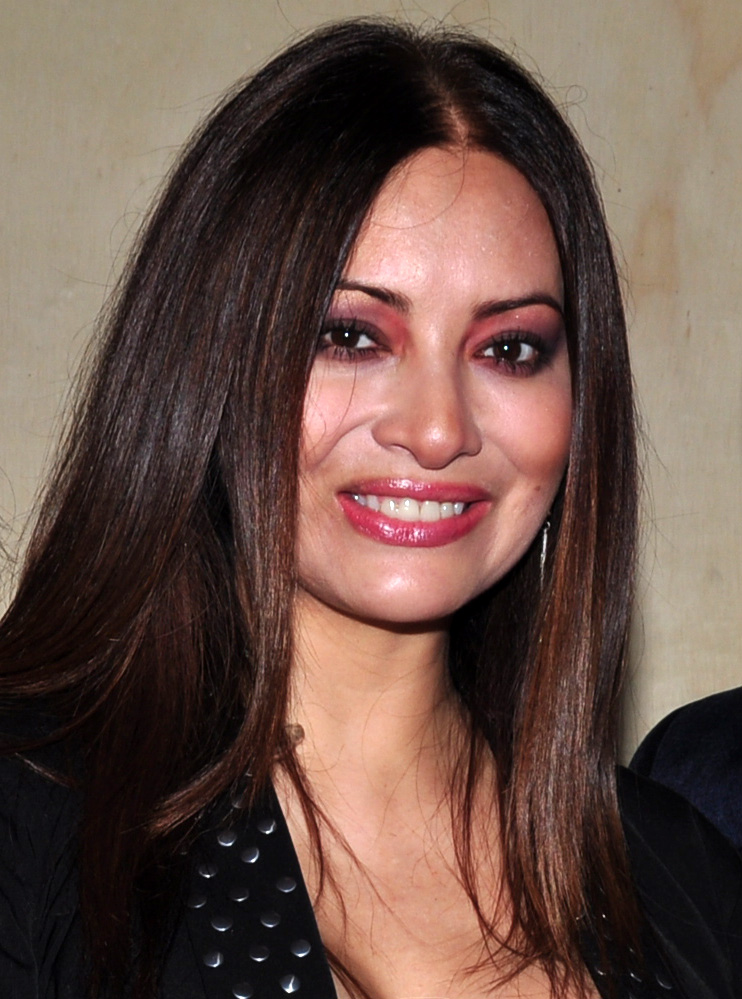
Myriam Hernández

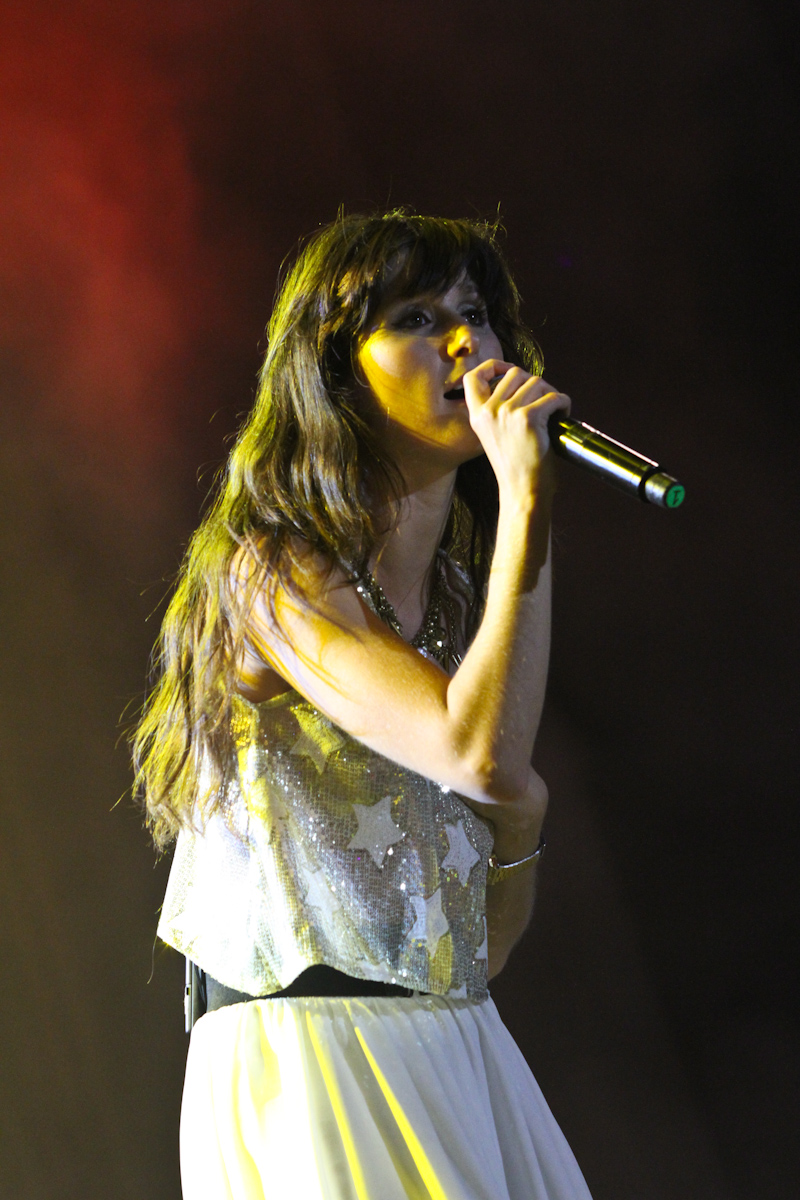
Francisca Valenzuela

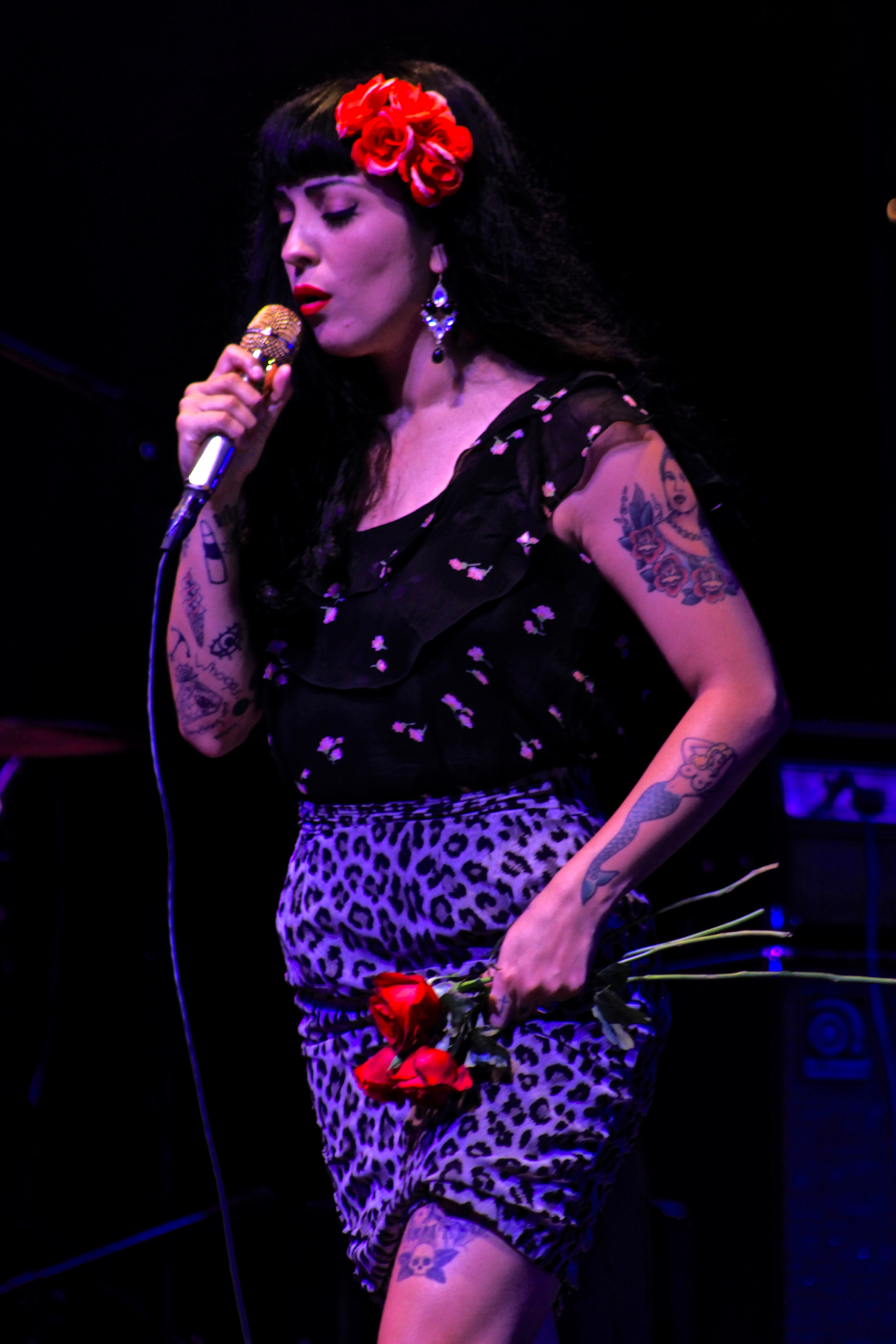
Mon Laferte

== Artists ==
- Claudio Bravo (1936–2011) – hyper-realist painter
- Carlos Catasse – painter
- Marta Colvin – sculptor
- Alfredo Jaar – installation artist, filmmaker and architect
- Olga Lehmann – painter
- Roberto Matta – painter, sculptor
- Camilo Mori – painter
- Dora Puelma – artist
- Carlos Sotomayor – cubist painter
- Miguel Venegas – painter, called "El Maestro" (the Master)

== Politicians ==
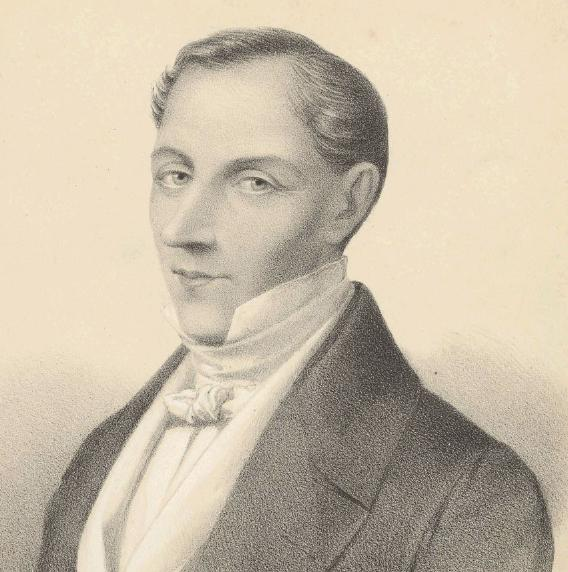
Diego Portales

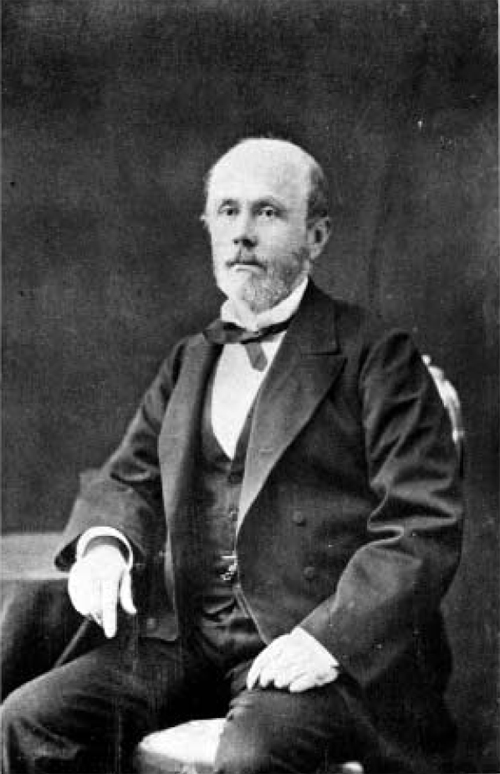
Aníbal Pinto

- Juana Rosa Aguirre – former first lady, wife of Pedro Aguirre Cerda
- Arturo Alessandri – served twice as president of Chile
- Jorge Alessandri – 27th President of Chile; President of Council of State under Pinochet Regime
- Salvador Allende – former senator and president of Chile; ousted in a military coup
- Clodomiro Almeyda – socialist politician
- Soledad Alvear – former Justice minister and Foreign minister; current PDC senator
- Celinda Arregui – feminist politician, writer, teacher, suffrage activist
- Gabriel Boric – first youth leader politician of Chile
- Michelle Bachelet – first woman president of Chile
- Juan Chandía – governor of Department of Tomé for 1946–1952
- Carlos Dávila – former Secretary General of the Organization of American States
- Florencio Durán – former president of the senate
- Héctor Faúndez – diplomat
- Fernando Flores – businessman and former senator
- Gabriel González Videla – 25th President of Chile (1946-1952)
- Jaime Guzmán – right wing politician during the Pinochet regime; murdered by Manuel Rodríguez Patriotic Front on April 1, 1991; former UDI Senator
- Tomás Hirsch – former president of the Humanist Party of Chile; 2005 candidate for president
- Antonia Illanes – lawyer and politician
- José Miguel Insulza – former Interior minister; current Secretary General of the Organization of American States
- José Antonio Kast — president of the Republican Party, former deputy and councilman, presidential candidate in 2017 and in 2021.
- Carlos Keller – former Leader of the National Socialist Movement of Chile, responsible for the organization of the Seguro Obrero Massacre
- Joaquín Lavín – Independent Democratic Union candidate for presidency in 2005 election; former mayor of Las Condes and Santiago
- Orlando Letelier – Foreign Minister during Salvador Allende's government murdered during the Pinochet regime in Washington, D.C.
- Gladys Marín – communist leader, feminist activist, lived in exile, opposed conservatism and liberal economy, admirer of Lenin and Marx
- Raúl Morales Beltramí – politician and physician
- Herman Chadwick Piñera – Chilean lawyer, businessman, trade union leader and politician
- Sebastián Piñera – Chilean billionaire, businessman and politician; former President of Chile
- Aníbal Pinto – 9th President of Chile (1876-1881)
- Augusto Pinochet – Commander-in-Chief of the Armed Forces of Chile, President of the Government Junta of Chile, dictator from 1973 until 1990 and President from 1981 onwards.
- Diego Portales – Minister, major designer of the Chilean State during the first half of the 19th century
- Juan Antonio Ríos (1888–1946) – Chilean lawyer, political figure and 24th President of Chile
- Laura Rodríguez – first Humanist Party deputy in the world
- Jennifer Rojas – social worker and politician
- Camila Vallejo – Member of Parliament, led 2011 student protests in Chile
- Adolfo Zaldívar – PRI senator, former leader of the PDC
- Andrés Zaldívar – former PDC senator
- Herminia Colihueque, Mapuche first woman to run in an election for a political office

== Religious figures ==
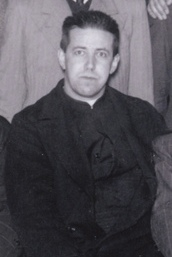
Saint Alberto Hurtado

- Rodolfo Acevedo – Mormon bishop
- Saint Teresa de los Andes – first Chilean saint
- Carlos Camus – Chilean bishop
- Francisco Javier Errázuriz – fourth Chilean cardinal
- Juan Francisco Fresno – third Chilean cardinal
- Raúl Silva Henríquez – second Chilean cardinal born in Talca; human rights advocate
- Alberto Hurtado – saint
- Jorge Medina – fifth Chilean cardinal; conservative figure
- Fr. Juan Ignacio Molina – Chilean priest, naturalist, historian, botanist, ornithologist, geographer
- José María Caro Rodríguez – first Chilean cardinal
- Francisco Javier Quintanilla – theologian
- Juan Subercaseaux Errázuriz – Chilean Roman Catholic Archbishop
- José María Vélaz – Chilean priest
- Blessed Laura Vicuña

== Sports ==
- Omar Aguilar – long-distance runner
- Marlene Ahrens – javelin thrower; Olympic silver medalist
- Fernando Alvarez – jockey
- David Arellano – football player; namesake of Colo-Colo's stadium
- Luis Ayala – tennis player; twice French Open finalist
- Gonzalo Barrios – eSports player
- Claudio Bravo – football player, FC Barcelona
- Ben Brereton – football player
- Nick Carle – football player, Sydney FC
- Patricio Castañeda – football player
- Carlos Caszely – football player
- Patricio Cornejo – tennis player, 1976 Davis Cup finalist
- Cristián Garay – football referee
- Cristian Garín – tennis player, winner of 4 ATP titles
- Carlo de Gavardo – KTM rally motorcyclist
- Elías Figueroa – football player; three times elected as Best Football Player of America
- Jaime Fillol – tennis player, 1976 Davis Cup finalist
- Arturo Godoy – boxer, fought Joe Louis twice for the World Heavyweight title
- Fernando González – tennis player; only Chilean to win gold, silver and bronze medals at the Summer Olympics
- Tomás González – gymnast, Olympic finalist
- Juan Halty – former professional footballer
- Kai Horwitz (born 1998) – Olympic alpine skier
- Luis Jiménez (born 1987) – footballer
- Benjamín Kuscevic – football player
- Alberto Larraguibel – horse rider, record for puissance (high jump) on horseback
- Sergio Sapo Livingstone – Chilean football goalkeeper
- Anita Lizana – tennis player; 1937 US Open champion; first Latin American, and first Hispanic person, to be ranked World Number 1 in tennis
- Nicolás Massú (born 1979) – tennis player; highest world ranking #9, Olympic 2-time champion (singles and doubles)
- Carlos Moreno – track and field sprinter
- Iván Morovic – chess International Grandmaster
- Isidora Niemeyer – rower
- Érika Olivera – marathon runner; gold medal winner in women's marathon at the 1999 Pan American Games
- Andrés Parada - footballer
- Manuel Pellegrini – former footballer for Universidad de Chile, former manager of Real Madrid
- Alejandra Ramos – middle-distance runner
- Monica Regonesi – long-distance runner
- Sammis Reyes – basketball and American football player; first Chilean to play in the NFL
- Fernando Riera – Chile's most successful soccer coach; led the national team to a third-place finish in the 1962 World Cup
- Marcelo Ríos – first Latin American man to become world number-one tennis player
- Eduardo Robledo – football player, Newcastle United F.C.
- Jorge Robledo – player, Newcastle United F.C.
- Jose Romero – AFL player, Western Bulldogs
- Sebastián Rozental (born 1976) - professional soccer player
- Bayron Saavedra (born 1997) – footballer
- Marcelo Salas – football player; holds the record for most goals playing for the national team; won titles with every team he played with
- Eliseo Salazar – race car driver, competed in Formula One intermittently from 1980–1982, moved to Champ Car and the Indy Racing League
- Alexis Sánchez – football player, Sevilla
- Leonel Sánchez – football player, 1962 World Cup top scorer
- José A. Santos – jockey, winner of US Triple Crown
- Alejandro Silva – long-distance runner
- Pablo Squella – middle-distance runner
- José Sulantay – Chile's second most successful soccer coach, led the under 20 national team to a third-place finish at the 2007 FIFA U-20 World Cup in Canada
- Emilio Ulloa – long-distance runner
- Dion Valle – football player, Marconi Stallions FC
- Rodrigo Vargas – football player, Melbourne Victory FC
- Stephanie Vaquer - professional wrestler; first Chilean and South American woman to win WWE Women's Championship
- Arturo Vidal – football player, Colo-Colo
- Gert Weil – shot putter
- Iván Zamorano – football player
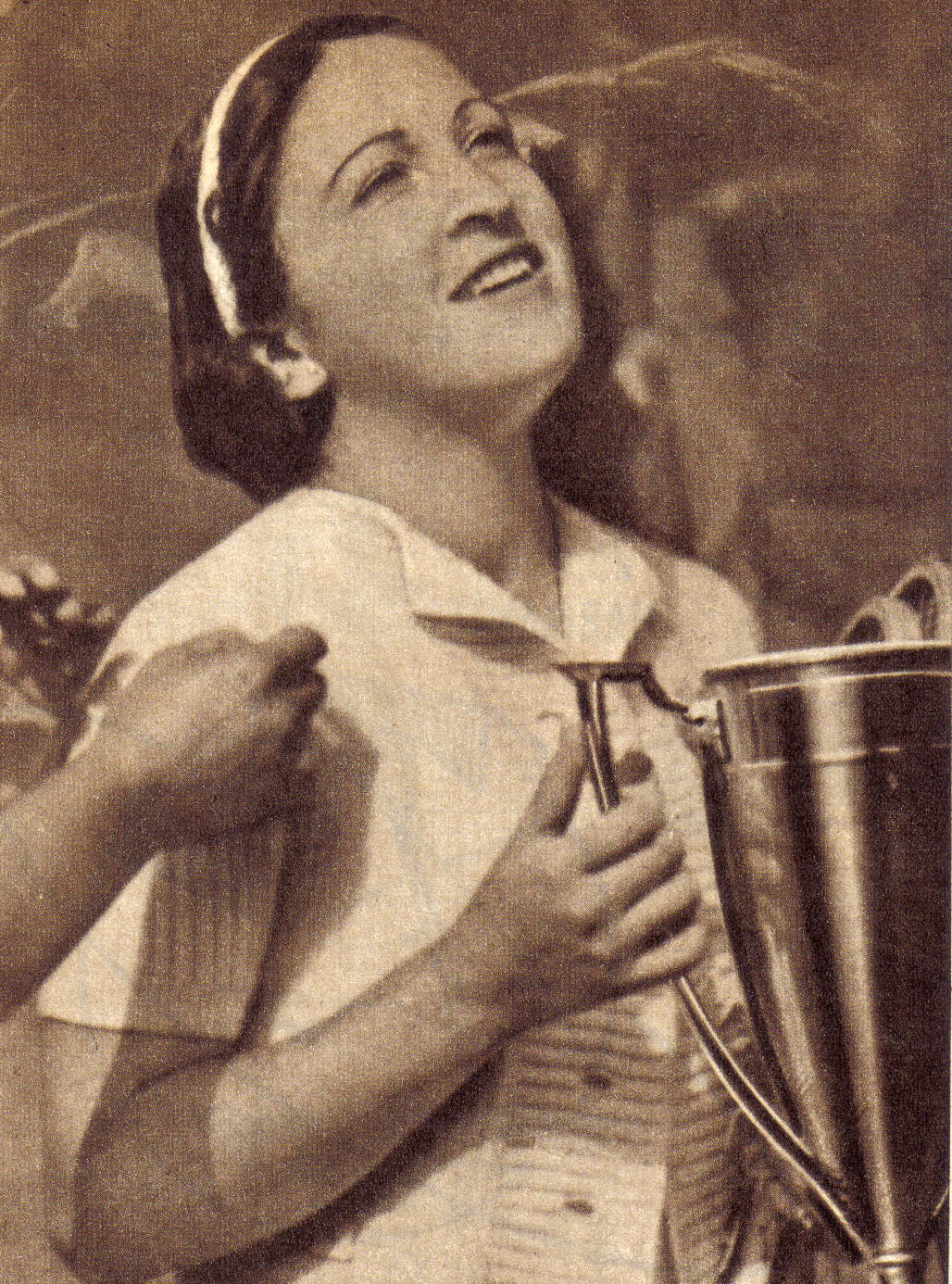
Anita Lizana

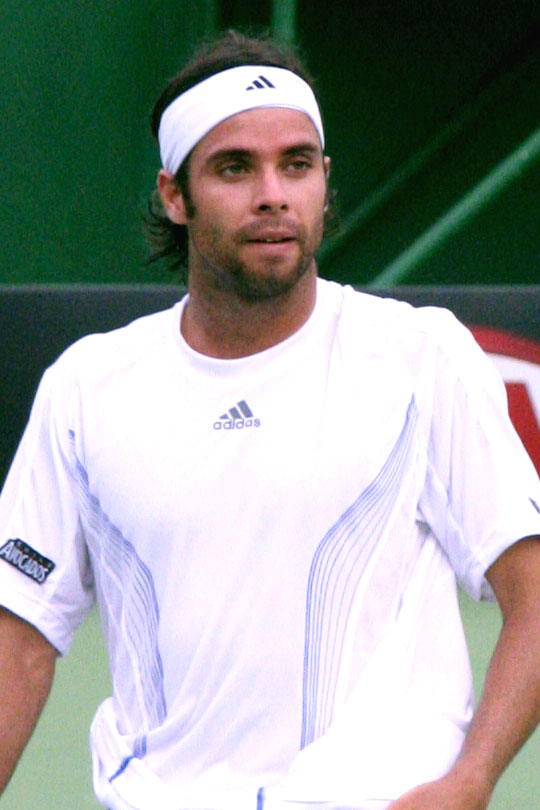
Fernando González

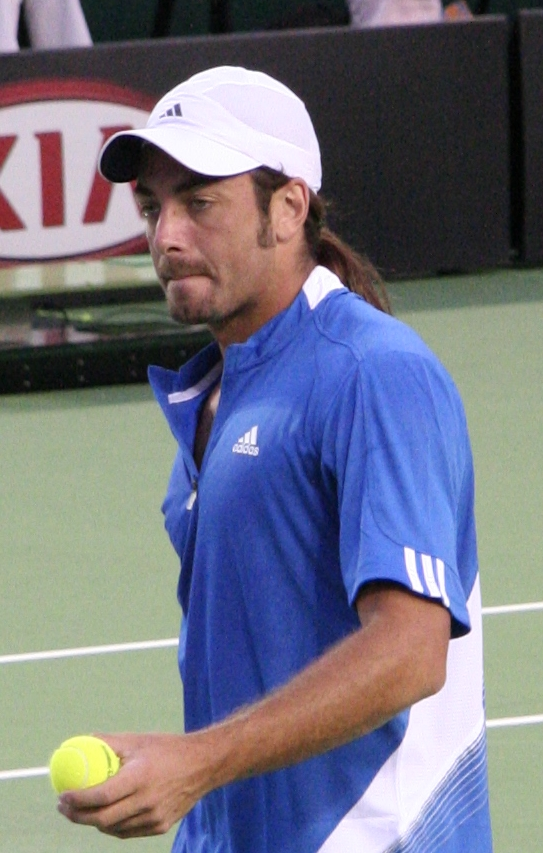
Nicolás Massú

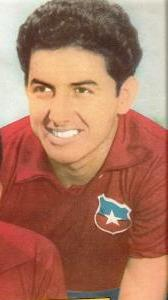
Leonel Sánchez

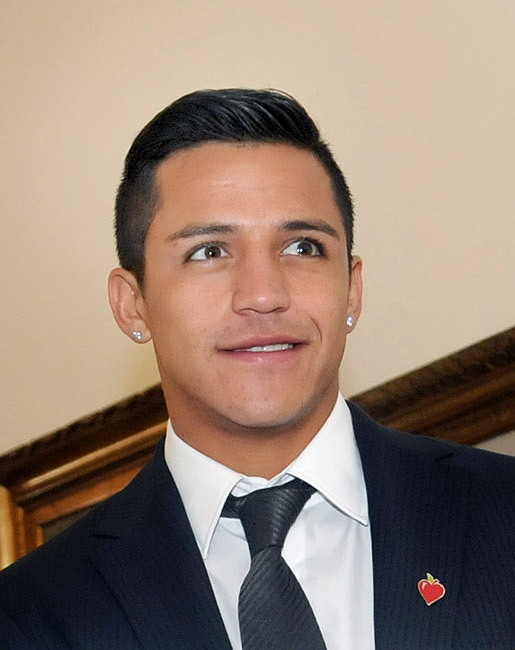
Alexis Sánchez

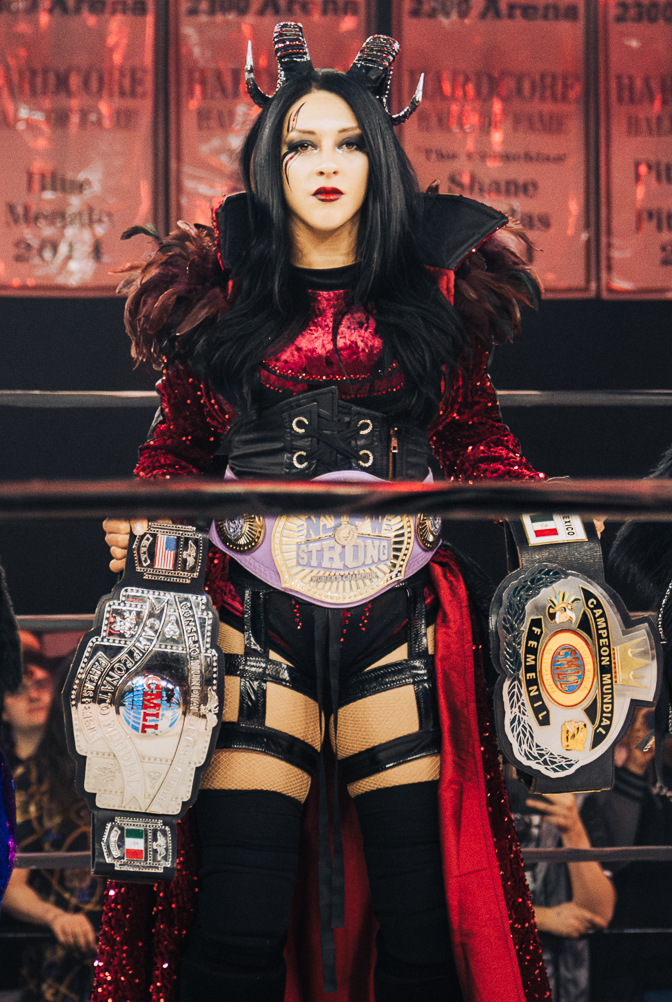
Stephanie Vaquer

== Scientists and engineers ==
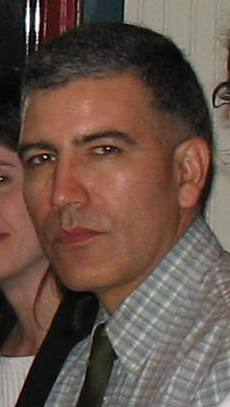
F. J. Duarte

- Ricardo Baeza Rodríguez – mathematician
- Ricardo Baeza-Yates – computer scientist
- Isabel Behncke - primatologist
- Erik Bongcam-Rudloff – bioinformatician
- Claudio Bunster – physicist
- Marcela Contreras – immunologist
- F. J. Duarte – laser physicist
- Matias Duarte – software inventor
- Julio M. Fernandez – biologist, academic
- Eric Goles – mathematician
- Mario Hamuy – cosmologist and astronomer
- Cesar A. Hidalgo – physicist
- Cecilia Hidalgo Tapia – biochemist
- Adriana Hoffmann – botanist, Environment Minister (2000–2001)
- Paula Jofré – astronomer and astrophysicist
- Humberto Maturana – biologist, co-author of the theory of autopoiesis
- Juan Ignacio Molina – 18th and 19th-century natural scientist
- Hermann Niemeyer – paediatrician and biochemist
- Ernestina Pérez Barahona, physician
- María Teresa Ruiz – astronomer
- Elisa Torres Durney - outstanding quantum student
- Gunther Uhlmann - mathematician
- Pablo DT Valenzuela – biotechnologist, co-founder of Chiron Corporation and Fundacion Ciencias Para la Vida
- Francisco Varela – biologist, co-author of the theory of autopoiesis

== Film and television personalities ==
- Alejandro Amenábar - film director, screenwriter and composer
- Cecilia Amenábar - actress, TV presenter and model
- Cecilia Bolocco - TV presenter, journalist and former Miss Universe
- Diana Bolocco - TV presenter and journalist
- Gabriela Bussenius - journalist, writer and filmmaker
- Santiago Cabrera - actor
- Felipe Camiroaga - TV presenter
- Charissa Chamorro - actress
- Martín Cárcamo - TV presenter
- Karen Doggenweiler - TV presenter
- Julián Elfenbein - radio and TV presenter
- Pablo Francisco - comedian, actor and writer
- Cristián de la Fuente - actor and model
- Alberto Fuguet - film director, author, journalist and film critic
- Jorge Garcia - actor and comedian
- Paulina García - actress
- Luis Gatica - actor
- Claudia di Girolamo - actress
- Luis Gnecco - actor
- Magdalena Grant - TV presenter and sports journalist
- Lisa Guerrero - journalist, TV presenter, actress and model
- Patricio Guzmán - film director
- Alejandro Jodorowsky - filmmaker
- Mario Kreutzberger (Don Francisco) – TV presenter
- Pablo Larraín - film director
- Sebastián Lelio - film director and screenwriter
- Ariel Levy - actor
- Carolina Mestrovic - TV presenter and actress
- Claudio Miranda - cinematographer
- Cristina Montt - actress
- Cote de Pablo - actress
- Pedro Pascal - actor
- Carlos Pinto - TV presenter and journalist
- Nicole Polizzi – reality TV Personality
- Antonio Prieto - actor and singer
- Francisco Puelles - actor and TV personality
- Francisco Reyes Morandé - actor
- Raúl Ruiz - film director
- Katherine Salosny - TV presenter and actress
- Horatio Sanz - actor and comedian
- Fernando Solis - radio and TV presenter
- Tonka Tomicic - TV presenter and model
- Catalina Vallejos - actress and model
- Leonor Varela - actress and model
- Daniela Vega - actress
- Gabriela Velasco – actress and television presenter
- Benjamín Vicuña - actor
- Alexander Witt - filmmaker
- Andrés Wood - film director and screenwriter
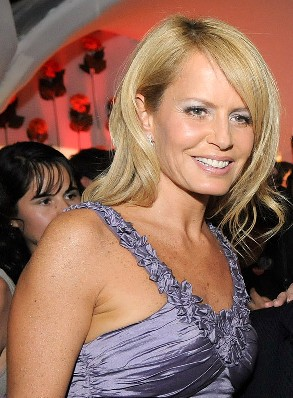
Cecilia Bolocco

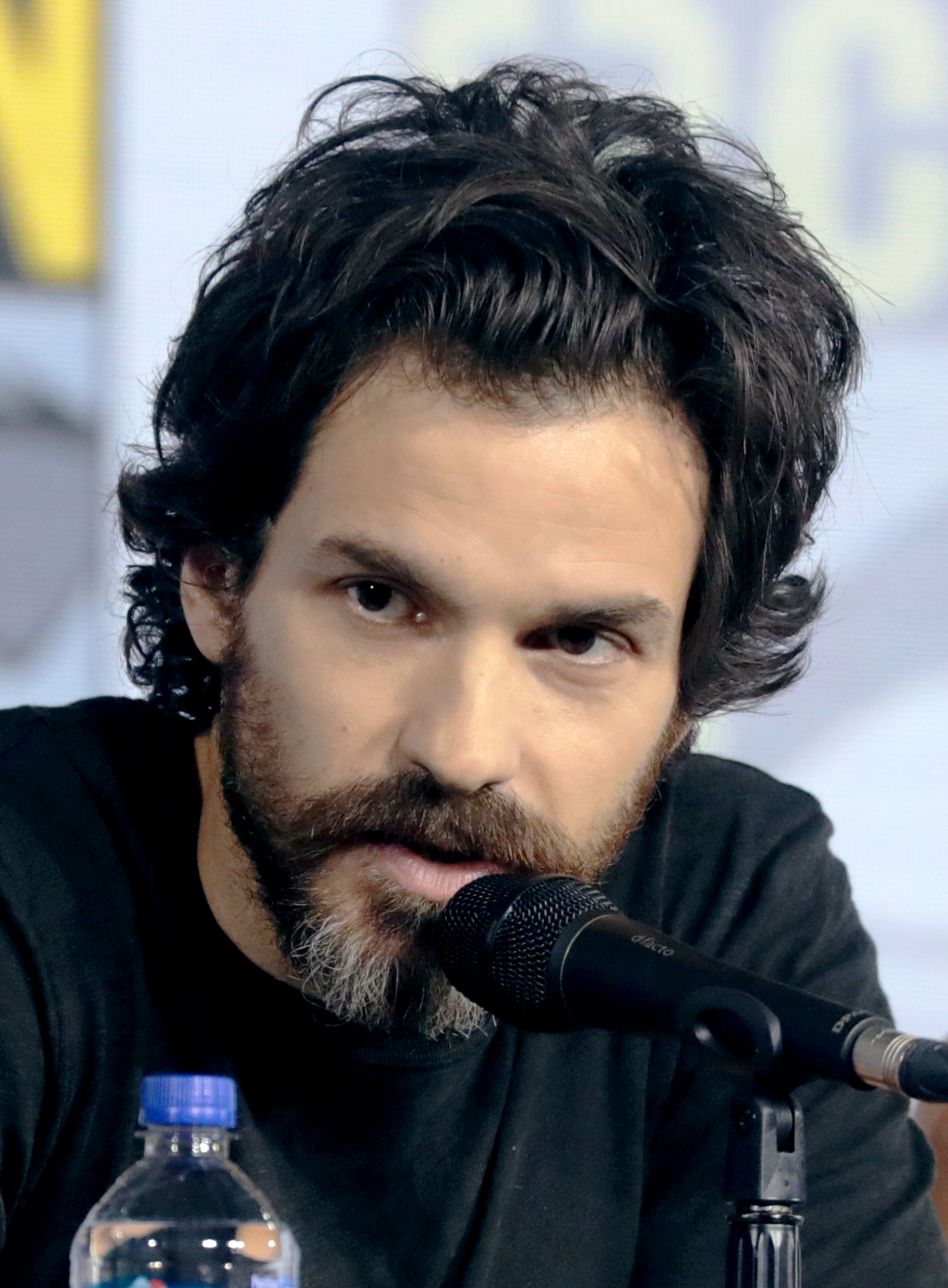
Santiago Cabrera

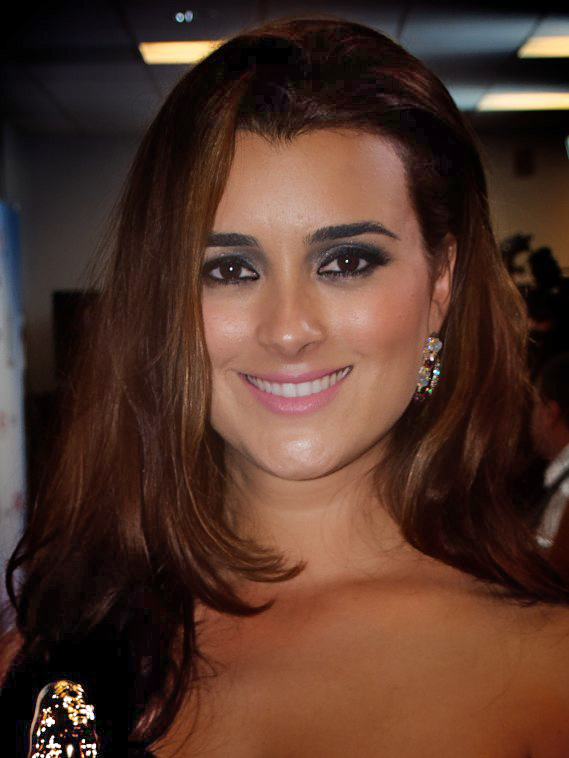
Cote de Pablo

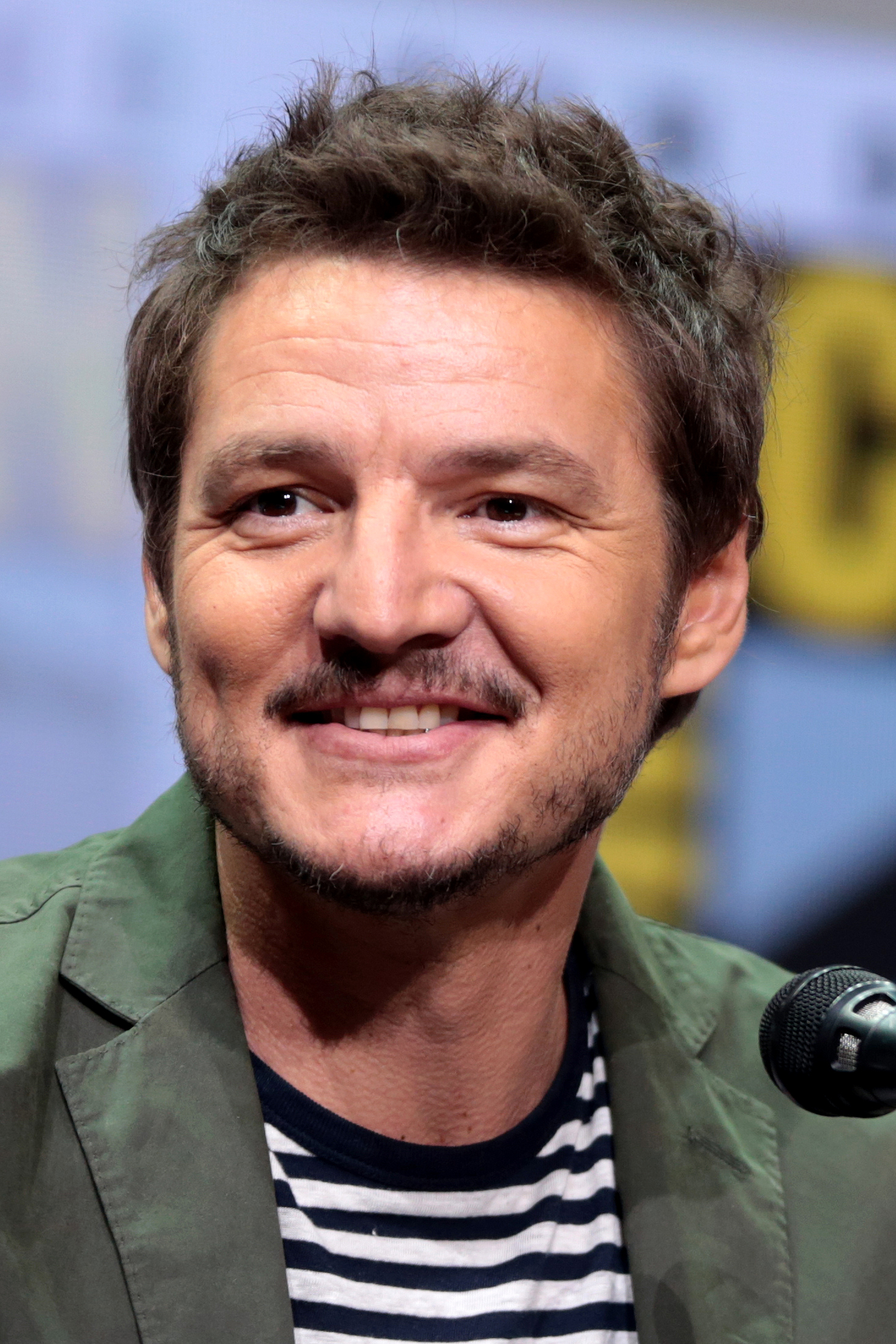
Pedro Pascal

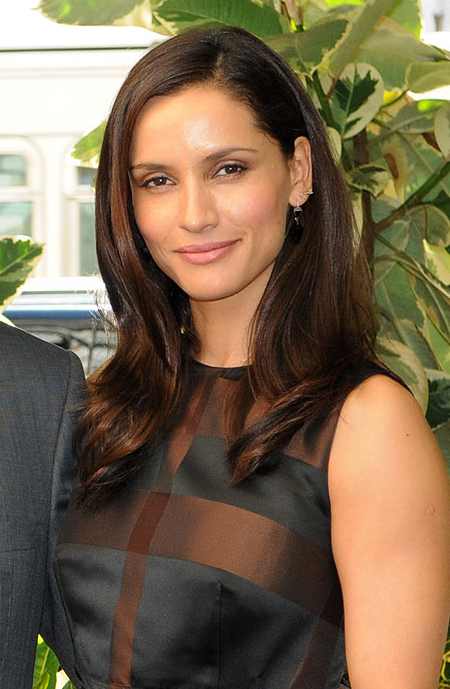
Leonor Varela

== Writers ==
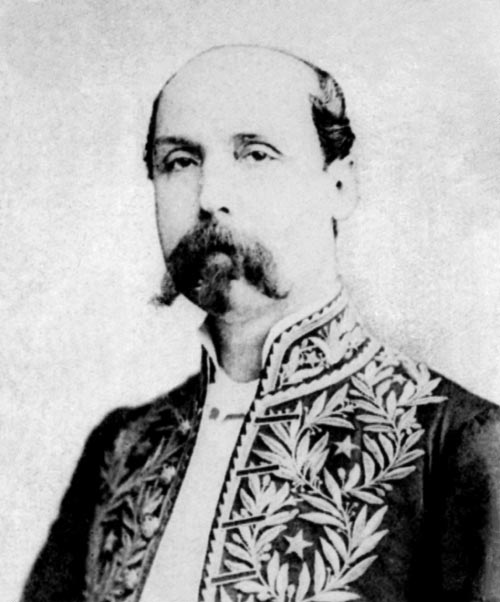
Alberto Blest Gana

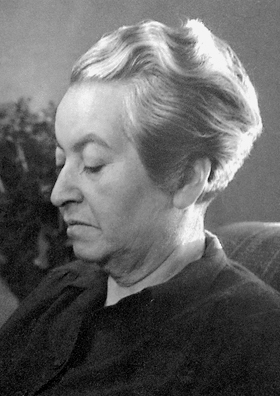
Gabriela Mistral

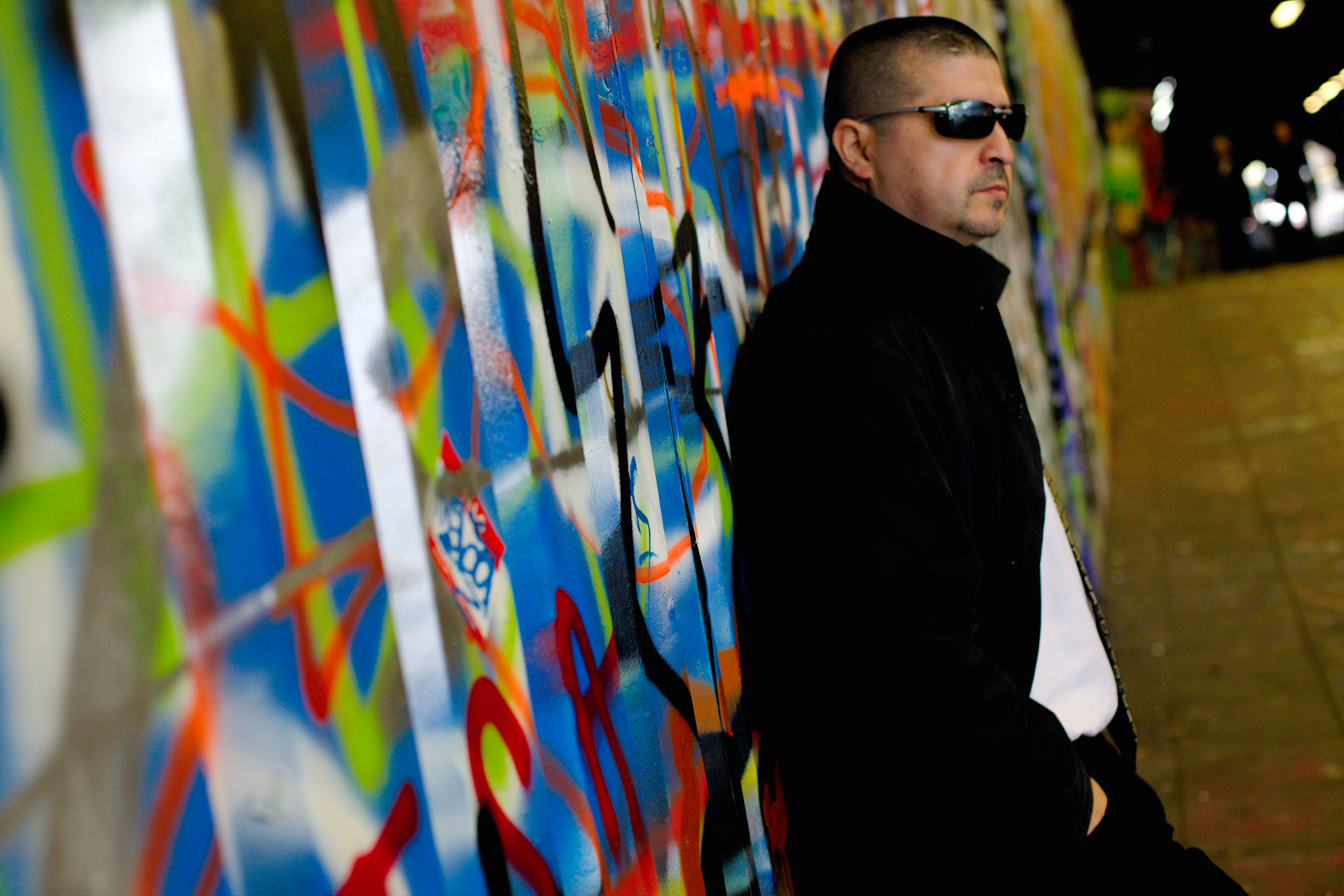
Jorge Salgado-Reyes

- Lorenzo Aillapán – poet
- Fernando Alegría – writer
- Isabel Allende – novelist (The House of Spirits)
- Roberto Ampuero – novelist (Cayetano Brulé series)
- Roberto Bolaño – novelist (The Savage Detectives, 2666)
- Liborio Brieba – writer
- Francisco Coloane – (Tierra del fuego)
- Angel Cruchaga Santa Maria (1893–1964) – writer, won the Chilean National Prize for Literature in 1948
- Ariel Florencia Richards (1981—) – writer and researcher of the visual arts
- Eugenio Cruz Vargas (1923–2014) – poet and painter, of Basque descent
- Francisco Núñez de Pineda y Bascuñán – writer of Cautiverio feliz y razón individual de las guerras dilatadas del Reino de Chile in 1673
- Pablo de Rokha – Chilean National Prize for Literature in 1965
- José Donoso – writer (Coronation, The Obscene Bird of Night)
- Ariel Dorfman – novelist, playwright (Death and the Maiden), academic, essayist, journalist and human rights activist
- Jorge Edwards – 1999 Cervantes Prize winner
- Alberto Fuguet – novelist; short story writer, Mala Onda, Las películas de mi vida; filmmaker, Se Arrienda
- Alberto Blest Gana – novelist (Martín Rivas)
- Olga Grau - philosopher
- Juan Guzman Cruchaga (1895–1979) – poet and diplomat, won the Chilean National Prize for Literature in 1962; of Basque descent
- Óscar Hahn – writer and poet
- Vicente Huidobro – father of the "Creationism" movement in Paris
- Cristián Huneeus – writer
- Enrique Lafourcade – novelist
- Hernán Rivera Letelier – novelist (Santa María de las Flores Negras, La Reina Isabel Cantaba Rancheras), poet, writer of short stories
- Enrique Lihn – poet, playwright, and novelist
- Carmen Marai – novelist El Alba de la Mandrágora (The Dawn of the Mandrake), poet, writer of short stories
- Sergio Missana – novelist
- Gabriela Mistral – winner of the Nobel Prize in Literature
- Nicolasa Montt – poet
- Tomás Moulian – political scientist and sociologist
- Pablo Neruda – winner of the Nobel Prize in Literature
- Raquel Olea – writer, professor
- Nicanor Parra – self-proclaimed "anti-poet"
- Adolfo Quiros – (1853–1910), poet
- Gonzalo Rojas – 2004 Cervantes Prize winner
- Elvira Santa Cruz Ossa – dramatist and novelist
- Luis Sepúlveda – novelist
- Antonio Skármeta – author of Ardiente Paciencia (Burning Patience), which inspired the movie Il Postino (The Postman), about poet Pablo Neruda
- Amelia Solar de Claro – poet, playwright, and essayist
- Mercedes Valdivieso – writer
- Sergio Vodanovic – playwright

== Architects ==
- Alejandro Aravena – 2015 Pritzker Prize winner
- Guillermo Jullian de la Fuente
- Mathias Klotz – 2001 Borromini Prize of Architecture winner for under-40 architects

== Others ==
- Raúl Aldunate Phillips – writer, politician, and soldier
- Cecilia Magni Camino – guerilla leader and sociologist
- Vanessa Ceruti – Miss Universe Chile 2011
- Nataly Chilet – Miss World Chile 2008
- Claudio Grossman – chairman of the Human Rights Interamerican Court
- Hil Hernández – Miss Earth 2006
- Immanuel Holger – soldier and politician
- Carolina Huidobro – teacher and suffragist
- Carlos Kaiser – former National Director of the National Fund for Disabilities
- Themo Lobos – comic artist
- Andrónico Luksic – chairman of Quiñenco Holdings, which owns Banco de Chile, Antofagasta Minerals, one of the largest Chilean financial groups
- La Quintrala – Catalina de los Ríos y Lisperguer, aristocratic and sadistic landowner and witch during the Colonial Period
- Rene Ríos Boettiger (Pepo) – comic artist (Condorito)
- Juana Ross Edwards (1830–1913) – philanthropist
- Sergio Saavedra (1927–2022) – engineer and politician
- Sola Sierra – human rights activist
- Juan Somavia – Director-General of the International Labour Organization
- Joaquín Toesca – designer of the presidential house "La Moneda", in Santiago
- Maria Jose Ubiergo – Chilean DREAMer in the United States, Story Featured in the New York Times; Family member to notable Chilean Folk Singer Fernando Ubiergo Her story has been featured in El Diario, ABC, and News 12 Connecticut, among other media outlets.
- Arturo Valenzuela – former Assistant Secretary of State for Western Hemisphere Affairs
- Bernardita Zúñiga – Miss World Chile 2007
- Sergio Catalán – first to discover crash survivors of Uruguayan Air Force Flight 571, and integral to rescuing all 16 remaining survivors

== See also ==
- Chilean American
- Chilean Australian
- Chilean British
- List of people by nationality
