= Saavedra =

Saavedra may refer to:

== Places ==
- Saavedra, Buenos Aires, Argentina
- Saavedra, Chile, a commune in the Araucanía Region
- Saavedra Partido, a partido or department of Buenos Aires Province
- Saavedra (Santa Cruz), a town in Santa Cruz department, Bolivia
- Saavedra, a barangay of the town Moalboal in Southern Cebu, Philippines

== People ==
- Saavedra (surname)

== Other uses ==
- Saavedra position, a famous endgame study in chess

== See also ==
- Cornelio Saavedra Province, Bolivia
