= Guillermo Saavedra =

Guillermo Saavedra may refer to:

- Guillermo Saavedra (footballer) (1903–1957), Chilean footballer who played in the 1930 FIFA World Cup
- Guillermo Saavedra (poet) (born 1960), Argentine poet, editor, and journalist
