= Bussenius =

Bussenius is a surname. Notable people with the surname include:

- Gabriela Bussenius (1901–1975), Chilean journalist, writer and filmmaker
- Minerva Bussenius (1893–1966), American stage and silent film actress known as Roberta Arnold
