= Parada =

Parada may refer to:

== Places ==
=== Portugal ===
- Parada (Alfândega da Fé), a civil parish in the municipality of Alfândega da Fé
- Parada (Almeida), a civil parish in the municipality of Almeida
- Parada (Arcos de Valdevez), a civil parish in the municipality of Arcos de Valdevez
- Parada (Bragança), a civil parish in the municipality of Bragança
- Parada (Carregal do Sal), a civil parish in the municipality of Carregal do Sal
- Parada (Monção), a civil parish in the municipality of Monção
- Parada (Paredes de Coura), a civil parish in the municipality of Paredes de Coura
- Parada (Vila do Conde), a civil parish in the municipality of Vila do Conde
- Parada de Cima, a hamlet in the civil parish of Fonte de Angeão, municipality of Vagos

== People ==
=== Given name ===
- Parada Harahap (1899–1959), Indonesian journalist and writer
- Parada Thitawachira (born 1996), Thai singer

=== Surname ===
- Adam Parada (born 1981), American-born Mexican basketball player
- Aída Parada (1903–1983), Chilean educator and feminist activist
- Alejandro Parada (born 2004), Cuban athlete specialising in the long jump
- Andrés Parada (born 1984), Chilean footballer
- Antônio Parada Neto (1939–2018), Brazilian footballer known mononymously as Parada
- David Parada (born 1987), Spanish footballer
- Enrique Parada (born 1981), Bolivian footballer
- Esther Parada (1938–2005), American photographer
- Facundo Parada (born 2000), Uruguayan footballer
- Felipe Parada (born 1982), Chilean tennis player.
- Guillermo Parada (born 1967), Argentine sailor
- Humberto Parada (1905–1954), Chilean politician
- Jaime Parada (born 1977), Chilean gay rights activist and politician
- Javiera Parada (born 1974), Chilean actress and politician
- Jose Parada (born 1987), American soccer player
- Kevin Parada (born 2001), American baseball catcher
- José Luis Parada (born 1953), Bolivian economist and politician
- Jovino Parada (born 1930), Chilean farmer and politician
- Lidia Parada (born 1993), Spanish athlete specialising in the javelin throw
- Luis Parada (lawyer) (born 1960), Salvadoran lawyer and politician
- Luis Parada (neuroscientist), Colombian neuroscientist and biologist
- Oleg Parada (born 1969), Russian footballer
- Pete Parada (born 1973), American drummer
- Ricardo Parada (born 1985), Chilean footballer
- Roberto Parada (actor) (1909–1986), Chilean actor, theater director and teacher
- Roberto Parada (painter) (born 1969), freelance illustrator
- Rodolfo Parada, Chilean musician and anthropologist
- Víctor Parada (born 2002), Spanish footballer

== Other ==
- Parada (Kuršumlija), a village in Serbia
- Parada kingdom, a tribe in ancient Central Asia
- Parada (dance move) in Argentine Tango
- Parada (Lindberg), a 2001 orchestral composition by Magnus Lindberg
- Parada (film), a 2011 Serbian film
- Parada (bug), a genus of lace bugs in the family Tingidae
