= José Sepúlveda =

José Sepúlveda may refer to:

- El Monteaguilino (José Heriberto Sepúlveda), Chilean folklorist and television host
- José Sepúlveda (footballer), Chilean footballer
- José Sepúlveda (actor)
