= Luis Jiménez =

Luis Jiménez may refer to:

- José Luis Jiménez (born 1983), Chilean football player
- Luis Jiménez (footballer, born 1984), Chilean football player
- Luis Jiménez (bishop) (1586–1636), Spanish Roman Catholic bishop
- Luis Jiménez (first baseman) (born 1982), Venezuelan baseball player
- Luis Jiménez (third baseman) (born 1988), Dominican baseball player
- Luis Jiménez (fencer) (born 1928), Mexican Olympic fencer
- Luis Jiménez (sculptor) (1940–2006), American sculptor
- Luis Jiménez (sport shooter) (born 1924), Mexican Olympic shooter
- Luis Jiménez (radio host) (born 1970), Puerto Rican radio talk show host
- Luis Jiménez (basketball) (born 1962), Venezuelan basketball player
- Luis Jiménez (volleyball) (born 1947), Cuban volleyball player
- Luis Jiménez Aranda (1845–1928), Spanish-French painter
- Luis Jiménez Barrera (born 1987), Chilean football player
- Luis Jiménez de Asúa (1889–1970), Spanish jurist and politician
