= Saavedra (surname) =

Saavedra is a Galician surname derived from places named Saavedra in the Ourense and Lugo provinces of Galicia, Spain. Saavedra consists of the Galician words saa, meaning "hall" (which comes from Gothic sals) and vedro, meaning "old". Related surnames include Saabedra, Sabedra, and Savedra. The surname Saa (Sá in modern Portuguese orthography) is also common.

Notable people with the surname include:

- Abelardo Saavedra, American school district superintendent
- Álvaro de Saavedra Cerón (dead 1529), Spanish explorer
- Ángel de Saavedra, 3rd Duke of Rivas, Spanish poet, dramatist and politician
- Asya and Chloe Saavedra, American musicians, members of Chaos Chaos
- Carlos Saavedra Gutiérrez (born 1986), Puerto Rican lawyer, Secretary of Labor of Puerto Rico (2017–2019)
- Carlos Saavedra Lamas (1878–1959), Argentine academic and politician, first Latin American Nobel Prize recipient
- Catalina Saavedra (born 1968), Chilean television and film actress
- Cornelio Saavedra (1761–1829), Argentine soldier and politician
- Cornelio Saavedra Rodríguez (1823–1891), Chilean soldier, grandson of Cornelio Saavedra
- Craig Saavedra (born 1963), American film director
- Daniel Ortega, full name José Daniel Ortega Saavedra (born 1945), Nicaraguan politician
- Diego de Saavedra Fajardo (1584–1648), Spanish diplomat
- Erwin Saavedra (born 1996), Bolivian footballer
- Felipe Saavedra (born 1996), Chilean footballer
- Fresia Saavedra (1933–2024), Ecuadorian teacher and singer-songwriter
- Francisco Saavedra de Sangronis (1746–1819), Spanish diplomat and administrator
- Guillermo Saavedra (footballer) (1903–1957), Chilean footballer
- Guillermo Saavedra (poet) (born 1960), Argentine poet
- Héctor Puebla Saavedra (born 1955), Chilean footballer
- Hernando Arias de Saavedra (1561–1634), governor of the Río de la Plata
- Humberto Ortega Saavedra (1947–2024), Nicaraguan revolutionary, military leader and writer; brother of Daniel Ortega
- Ignacio Saavedra (born 1999), Chilean footballer
- Igor Saavedra (born 1966), Chilean musician
- Jerónimo Saavedra (1936–2023), Spanish politician, president of the Canary Islands (1983–1987, 1991–1993)
- José Alfredo Saavedra (born 1964), Honduran politician
- José Vilalta Saavedra (1865–1912), Cuban sculptor
- Luis Saavedra (1935–2013), Spanish footballer
- Miguel de Cervantes Saavedra (1547–1616), Spanish writer, author of Don Quixote
- Nélson Saavedra (born 1988), Chilean footballer
- Omar Saavedra Santis (1944–2021), Chilean writer
- Raúl Saavedra (footballer) (born 1978), Argentinian football defender
- Raúl Saavedra (cyclist) (born 1969), Colombian road cyclist
- Sebastián Saavedra (born 1990), Colombian race car driver
- Sergio Saavedra (1927–2022), Chilean politician
- Sergio Saavedra (athlete) (born 1968), Venezuelan triple jumper
