= Chilean =

Chilean may refer to:

- Something of, from, or related to Chile, a country in South America
- Chilean people
- Chilean Spanish
- Chilean culture
- Chilean cuisine
- Chilean Americans

== See also ==
- List of Chileans
