= Chandia =

Chandia may refer to

- Chandia, Madhya Pradesh
- Chandiya, a village in Kutch, India
- Chandiya (film), a 1965 Sri Lankan action movie
- Ali Asad Chandia (born 1976), Pakistani-born teacher convicted of terrorism in the United States
- Carlos Chandía (born 1964), Chilean football referee
- Juan Chandía (1892–1964), Chilean politician
- Chandia is a caste in Pakistan
