= Chile–Syria relations =

Bilateral relations

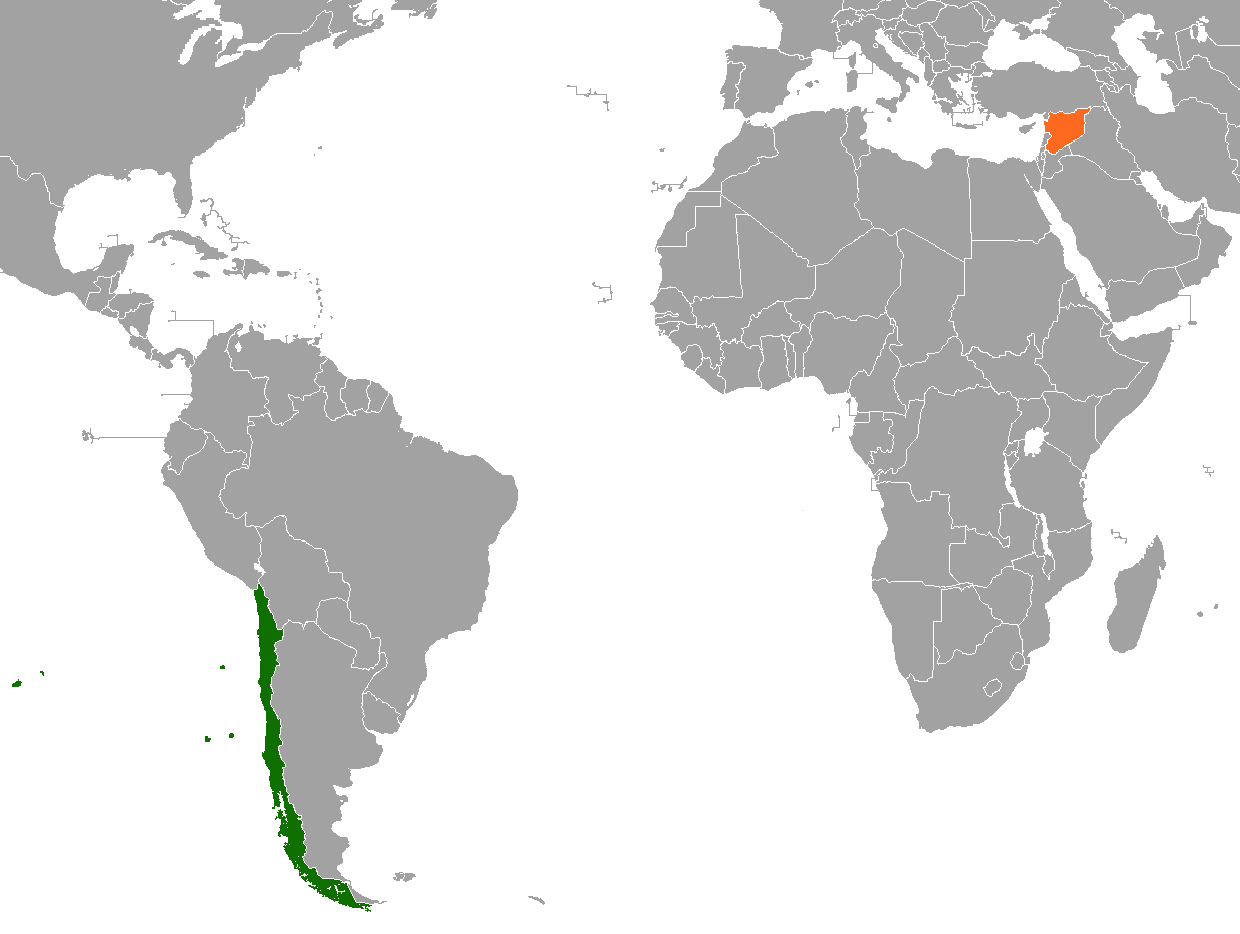
- Chile: Syria

Diplomatic mission
- Chilean Embassy, Damascus: Syrian Embassy, Santiago (Note: Also responsible for Syrian interests in Bolivia, Ecuador and Peru.)

Envoy
- Chargé d'Affaires José Patricio Brickle: Chargé d'Affaires Ayham Malazi

Chile–Syria relations refers to the bilateral relations between Chile and the Syrian Arab Republic. Syria has an embassy in Santiago. Chile has an embassy in Damascus. Both countries share longstanding historical and cultural ties, primarily due to the large Syrian community residing in Chile.

== History ==
Syrians first began migrating to Chile in the late 19th and early 20th centuries. Many Syrians, fleeing the political turmoil and economic hardships of the Ottoman Empire, chose Latin America as their destination, with a significant number arriving in Chile.

The Syrian community in Chile has retained strong cultural ties to their homeland, and many Chileans of Syrian descent maintain interest in Syria's political affairs. The Syrian community in Chile has also facilitated Chilean engagement with the broader Arab world.

Diplomatic relation between both countries were established on 22 October 1945. Chile has an embassy in Damascus, and Syria has an embassy in Santiago, as well as honorary consulates in La Serena, Osorno, Valparaíso, and Rancagua.

Bilateral relations between the two countries date back to 9 April 1928, when Chile appointed Fred Haleby Trabulsey as consul in Beirut with jurisdiction in Syria, Palestine, Mesopotamia and Persia. Formal diplomatic relations between Chile and Syria were established in 1945, following Syria’s independence from France, first at the level of non-resident embassies and then resident embassies in both Santiago de Chile and Damascus. Since then, both nations have maintained diplomatic missions.

The beginning of bilateral relations would be linked to the existence of an active colony of Syrians in Chile, who formed part of the Arab emigration since the end of the 19th century. According to the Social Guide of the Arab Colony in 1941, there were 706 Syrian families in Chile, equivalent to 3,520 people.

In 1975, a Friendship Mission, headed by the Chilean Vice-Chancellor Enrique Valdés, paid a visit to Syria. On that occasion, he met with his Syrian counterpart, as well as the Ministers of Economy and Education. At the end of July 1981, after several years of maintaining a friendly bilateral relationship, the Chilean ambassador to Syria, Miguel Jacob Helo, presented his Credentials to Syrian President Hafez al-Assad.

Syria, for its part, decided in September 1981, to raise the rank of its diplomatic representation in Chile. In June 1982, the new Syrian ambassador to Chile, Hisham Hallej, presented his credentials to General Augusto Pinochet.

In February 2006, following the publication in the press of a Danish publication featuring a caricature of the Prophet Muhammad, various demonstrations of discontent took place in the city of Damascus, where a crowd gathered outside the diplomatic headquarters of Denmark, located in the same building as the Chilean Embassy, being the target of looting and fires that culminated in the destruction of the offices in the Chilean legation. Another event that affected bilateral relations was the murder of the Chilean consul in Damascus, Héctor Faúndez, who on 26 March 2007 was found strangled and with signs of having been beaten in his apartment in the Malki neighborhood.

Following these events, the Government of Chile presented a note of protest to the Syrian government. Two other protest notes were presented by Chile to Syria, first for the detention and beating of a Chilean tourist in Damascus in March 2011, and later in May of that year for the violation of the principle of diplomatic inviolability of an official car.

== Economic relations ==
Trade between Chile and Syria has remained limited due to geographical distance and differing economic structures. However, both nations have expressed interest in expanding trade. While direct trade volumes remain low, members of the Syrian diaspora in Chile have facilitated some commercial ties between Chilean and Syrian companies.

== Cultural and social relations ==
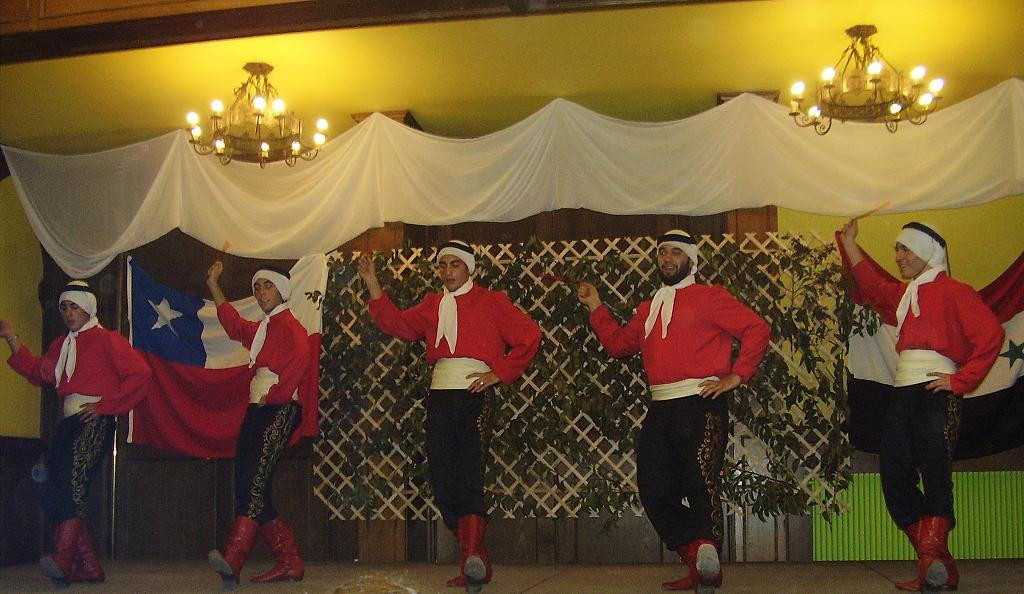
Group dancing dabke in the Syrian Unity Club in Chile.

The Syrian community in Chile plays a significant role in fostering cultural relations between the two countries. Syrians and their descendants have contributed to Chilean society in fields like business, arts, and politics. In Chile, there are various Syrian cultural centers and organizations dedicated to preserving Syrian heritage and promoting cultural exchange.

== Humanitarian and political issues ==
During the Syrian Civil War, Chile expressed concern over the humanitarian situation in Syria and has supported various United Nations resolutions calling for an end to the violence and for humanitarian aid to reach affected areas within Syria. Additionally, Chile has provided refuge to a small number of Syrian refugees.

== See also ==
- Foreign relations of Chile
- Foreign relations of Syria
- Arab Chileans
