= Juan de Quiroga y Apablaza =

Chilean Army officer

Juan de Quiroga y Apaolaza
- Born: 1774
- Died: 1845 (aged 70–71)
- Military career
- Allegiance: Chilean

Juan de Quiroga y Apaolaza (1774–1845) was a Chilean military figure from Santiago.
