= Antonia Illanes =

Chilean lawyer and politician

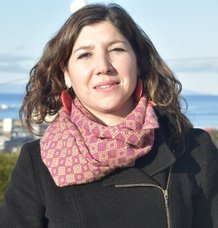

Undesrecretary of Sports
- Incumbent
- Assumed office 11 March 2022
- President: Gabriel Boric
- Preceded by: Andrés Otero

Personal details
- Born: 11 November 1980 (age 45) Punta Arenas, Chile
- Party: Social Convergence
- Education: University of Chile (LL.B); University of Barcelona (MD)
- Occupation: Politician
- Profession: Lawyer

Antonia Fernanda Illanes Riquelme (Santiago, November 11, 1980) is a Chilean lawyer and politician, member of Social Convergence (CS). Since March 11, 2022, she has been serving as the Undersecretary of Sports of Chile under the government of Gabriel Boric.

== Studies and personal life ==
Antonia Illanes completed her law degree from the University of Chile, followed by a master's degree in advanced legal studies, specializing in international law from the University of Barcelona, Spain.

She is a trained classical ballet dancer since 1986 and also represented the Law School of the University of Chile in swimming. She is a mother of one daughter, Leonor.

== Professional career ==
She has worked in both the public and private sectors as a practicing lawyer. She worked as a lawyer in the 22nd Civil Court of Santiago and also at the Legal and Social Attention Center of Lo Espejo operated by the Judicial Assistance Corporation (CAJ). She has also handled important labor cases, carrying out judicial strategies and labor lawsuits, litigating in the Courts of Appeals of the Metropolitan Region of Santiago and in the Supreme Court.

During Michelle Bachelet's second government between 2014 and 2018, she was part of the Legal Division of the then National Council for Culture and the Arts (CNCA). She was also a lawyer at the 2nd Electoral Tribunal in the Metropolitan Region. Later, she served as Chief of Staff of the then deputy, Gabriel Boric, during the legislative period 2018–2022, leading the team and developing her functions in the Magallanes Region and the National Congress.

== Political career ==
She has been based for several years in the commune of Punta Arenas in the Magallanes Region, where she has been working on different environmental issues and participating in social organizations. She served as Chief of Staff of the Municipality of Punta Arenas from July 2021 to March 2022.

She was appointed as the head of the Undersecretary of Sports by President-elect Gabriel Boric in February 2022, becoming the second woman to hold the position. She assumed her position on March 11, 2022, with the formal start of the administration.
