= Elisa Torres Durney =

Chilean social entrepreneur and STEM activist

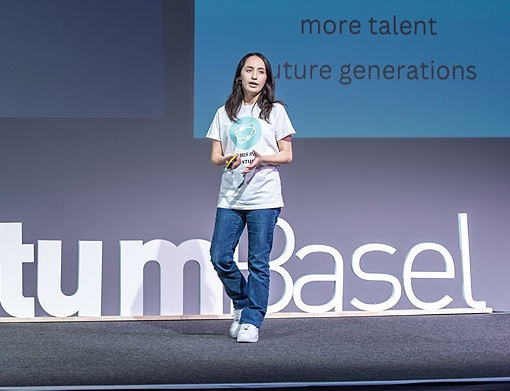
- Born: Viña del Mar, Valparaíso Region, Chile
- Education: Duke University
- Occupations: Social entrepreneur and STEM activist
- Known for: Girls in Quantum
- Website: www.girlsinquantum.com

Elisa Torres Durney is a Chilean social entrepreneur and STEM activist. She is the founder and executive director of Girls in Quantum. In 2023 she received a Top 10 Global Student Prize.

== STEM activism ==
Durney attended IBM's Qubit x Qubit Coding School and completed its Introduction of Quantum Computing program in 2021. In 2022, she established Girls in Quantum, an international network of students whose goal is to provide women and adolescents with education resources for quantum computing.

Since then, she has given guest lectures at both domestic and international STEM conferences while attending programs such as Young Global Scholars at Yale University, Future Scholar Program at the University of Cambridge, and the Junior Academy of the New York Academy of Sciences.

In April 2023 she collaborated with an initiative that was created to celebrate World Quantum Day in 2023 and answer quantum science related questions submitted to Q-12 partners by teachers and students. The National Q-12 Education Partnership receives support from NSF, the Boeing Corporation, NASA, Caltech, University of Illinois Urbana-Champaign and IBM.

Torres was a member of the technical staff of the "Digital Revolution" panel of the National Council of Science, Technology, Knowledge, and Innovation for Development (CTCI), along with academics and professionals from the technology industry. In representation of Chilean students, the technical panel is part of the "Chile makes the Future" trend anticipation exercise, which aims to develop recommendations for the best design of public policies. Results were presented to the president of the Republic of Chile in June 2023.

In November 2023, Durney was a part of the organizing committee of the first Spanish-speaking quantum computing school's festival called "Qiskit Fall fest".

== Public speaking ==
Durney has spoken at conferences including Quantum Latino, IBM Innovation Day, El Mercurio's Protagonists of the Future, Women's Innovation Day of the Women Economic Forum, the International Festival of Social Innovation, Quantum Basel, EY Strategic Forum, TED X, The Lancet, IEEE STEM Summit 2023, Economist Impact Commercialising Quantum, among others.

== Awards and recognition ==
Her work in scientific dissemination has earned recognition from:

- Forbes Chile - 30 Most Powerful Women 2023
- Yale Young Global Scholar
- Appreciation letter from the President Office of Science and Technology Policy. (The White House, US Government)
- G100 Country Chair STEM Education (Women Economic Forum)
- Outstanding Performance Award (New York Academy of Sciences)
- 50 best students in the world
- 100 Women leader 2022, El Mercurio y Mujeres empresarias
