= Saavedra, Santa Cruz =

Coordinates: 17.2253°S 63.2142°W

Saavedra (Santa Cruz)
- Town
- Interactive map of Saavedra (Santa Cruz)
- Country: Bolivia
- Time zone: UTC-4 (BOT)

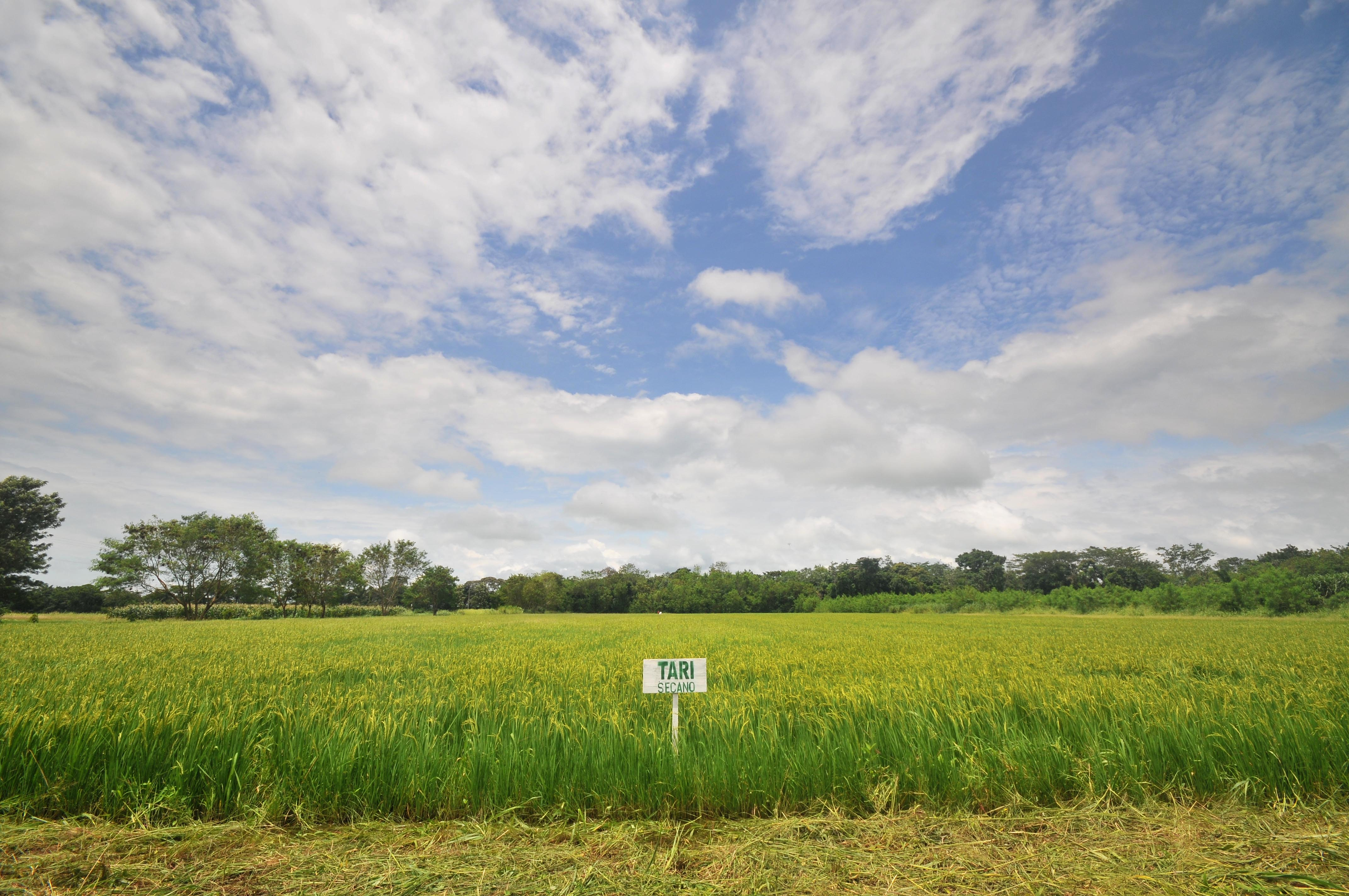
Farmland in Saavedra, Santa Cruz

Saavedra (Santa Cruz) is a small town in Bolivia.

== Climate ==
Climate data for Saavedra, Santa Cruz, elevation 320 m (1,050 ft)
Month	Jan	Feb	Mar	Apr	May	Jun	Jul	Aug	Sep	Oct	Nov	Dec	Year
Record high °C (°F)	39.6 (103.3)	36.7 (98.1)	36.8 (98.2)	39.2 (102.6)	36.0 (96.8)	36.5 (97.7)	39.0 (102.2)	39.0 (102.2)	38.1 (100.6)	39.7 (103.5)	41.6 (106.9)	40.6 (105.1)	41.6 (106.9)
Mean daily maximum °C (°F)	30.4 (86.7)	30.1 (86.2)	30.4 (86.7)	29.4 (84.9)	27.4 (81.3)	25.1 (77.2)	26.2 (79.2)	28.6 (83.5)	30.4 (86.7)	31.4 (88.5)	31.2 (88.2)	31.0 (87.8)	29.3 (84.7)
Daily mean °C (°F)	26.0 (78.8)	25.7 (78.3)	25.6 (78.1)	24.3 (75.7)	22.4 (72.3)	20.3 (68.5)	20.6 (69.1)	22.4 (72.3)	24.3 (75.7)	25.7 (78.3)	26.0 (78.8)	26.2 (79.2)	24.1 (75.4)
Mean daily minimum °C (°F)	21.7 (71.1)	21.3 (70.3)	20.8 (69.4)	19.3 (66.7)	17.5 (63.5)	15.5 (59.9)	14.9 (58.8)	16.2 (61.2)	18.3 (64.9)	20.1 (68.2)	20.7 (69.3)	21.4 (70.5)	19.0 (66.1)
Record low °C (°F)	13.0 (55.4)	10.4 (50.7)	8.0 (46.4)	7.8 (46.0)	4.2 (39.6)	1.5 (34.7)	0.5 (32.9)	3.5 (38.3)	7.0 (44.6)	9.8 (49.6)	6.7 (44.1)	12.0 (53.6)	0.5 (32.9)
Average precipitation mm (inches)	215.2 (8.47)	181.6 (7.15)	125.1 (4.93)	86.2 (3.39)	77.3 (3.04)	65.2 (2.57)	44.3 (1.74)	49.8 (1.96)	68.5 (2.70)	112.8 (4.44)	160.7 (6.33)	218.3 (8.59)	1,405 (55.31)
Average precipitation days	13.2	12.2	10.5	7.0	7.1	5.4	4.0	4.1	5.0	7.0	8.8	11.9	96.2
Average relative humidity (%)	74.6	75.2	73.9	72.0	72.2	70.9	63.6	56.6	56.0	61.2	66.2	71.6	67.8
Source: Servicio Nacional de Meteorología e Hidrología de Bolivia
