= Altazores =

Chilean rock band

Altazores is a Chilean rock band founded in 2004 by the multi-instrumentalist songwriter Mauricio Herrera who after writing, recording and producing his songs, formed a group of musicians for live performance.

The group became known for their third album Secret Behind the Chaos, published by the record company Sello Azul, as their music and lyrics were contingent on the student movement in Chile in 2011 considered one of the largest and most important since the return to democracy.

Since 2004 the group has released four official albums and 13 singles, including a live EP and three compilation albums.

The group takes its name in tribute to the poem Altazor or parachute ride, a masterpiece of Chilean poet Vicente Huidobro.

== History ==
=== Formation and early years (2002–2007) ===
In July 2002, Mauricio Herrera of seventeen, wrote his first song titled "When I See You Again" to play as a tribute during the funeral of his classmate Diego Perez murdered in an assault in Santiago de Chile. This event creates such an impact on Herrera that he decides to enter the next year to study Bachelor of Music and Sound in the university, where he met the drummer Patricio Gallardo and bassist José Oñate with whom, with his former classmate Rodrigo Ramirez in the second guitar, would be the first formation of the group.

On 11 December 2004, they made their debut under the name of "Altazores" when they participate in the Fifth National Festival of Young Bands, organized by the Estación Mapocho Cultural Centre where they won the first place with the song "Before Alba (solar eclipse)" song which was arranged by Angel Parra (Son) member of the band Los Tres and then professor of electrical guitar of Mauricio Herrera. The prize consisted of the edition of 500 copies of the winning song and an electric guitar delivered by Claudio Narea. That same night, the massive Chilean bands Chancho en piedra, Cholomandinga and Sinergia closed the concert. The following week, Mauricio registered the name with the turn of musical group in industrial property department of Chile, leaving as a mark of his property.

=== First album, El silencio no es callar (2007–2009) ===
In June 2007, they released "I can believe in you" first single from their debut album, which was part of the soundtrack of the series "Three are multitude", remake of the American series "Three's Company" transmitted by Mega and produced by Lucky Partners.

On April 11, 2008, without a recording label they released their first CD "el silencio no es callar" (Silence is Not Being Quiet). The album was recorded in the group's rehearsal room in the town of Batuco and in the recording studio of the University for the Arts, Sciences, and Communication UNIACC. The sound engineer was Marcelo Mollinedo and the mixing and mastering was done by Mariano Pavez in Elastika studio. The sound of "Silence is Not Silent" has influences of Chilean and British bands of the 90's, like Oasis and The Verve. Between April and September of that same year they released the singles "Silence is Not Silent", "Sun Eclipse" and "Firmament".

In March 2009, they released the double single "Fallen Tree" and "Deja vu", songs that were part of the soundtrack of the documentary "Last Exit" issued by National Television of Chile and produced by Roos Films. Earlier that month, was released in the University of Santiago, "The Big Unknown" documentary about Isidora Aguirre, as part of the celebrations of the 90th birthday of the connoted novelist and author of large Chilean classics like "La Pergola de las Flores". The documentary was directed by Julio Pincheira and the soundtrack was composed by Mauricio Herrera, which also included the song "Silence is not silent".

=== Spiritual energy EP (2010) ===
In November 2010, they released the live album "Spiritual Energy EP" from the concert held on October 21, 2010 in the auditorium of the University for the arts Sciences and Communication UNIACC. The only single from the album was the song "The Redemption" which was available as a free download only during the last week of October at the official website of the group, achieving over 5000 downloads. "Spiritual energy EP" was also available in 3 formats: CD, DVD and mp3. The album's sound highlighted by powerful acting ability of the new formation of Altazores which was Mauricio Herrera in the main voice and electric guitar, Sergio Carlini on drums, the sound engineer Andy Medina in the bass and Nicolas Quinteros of Chilean progressive rock band Delta on piano and theremin.

The recording of the concert over the hands of Marcelo Mollinedo and for the first time Mauricio Herrera showed his skills as a sound engineer, as he was in charge of the mixing and mastering of the album in his recording studio "Eco Studios" in Santiago.

=== Success, Secret Behind Chaos (2011–2014) ===
On May 19, 2011 they released their third album "Secret Behind the Chaos" published by the record company Sello Azul. For the first time, Altazores came out from the hiding of their self-management directly to the mass media.

The album was composed, recorded and mixed in Eco Studios by Mauricio and the mastering was done by Joaquín García. The album has the participation of Alvaro Zambrano in synthesizers, Nicolas Quinteros on piano and theremin, Patricio Pailamilla on trumpet, Sergio Carlini on drums and Rodrigo de la Rivera in the bass.

"Secret behind the chaos" is the album better received by critics and the fans of the group, is distinguished from previous albums in terms of production, arrangements and theme, "A comprehensive and consistent drive in sound proposal, with compositions who feel fresh and innovative and whose work arrangements reached remarkable levels." said Musica.cl site in June, 2011.

The sound of the album has a challenging proposition as the single "Vida Tirana" that mixes symphonic rock with traditional folk music of northern Chile and electronic music or the song "Everything is made of light" using the voice as the only instrumentation.

Herrera joined lyrics of contingent political and social events in Chile as in the song "Molotov" criticizing the strong repression by Special Police Forces during the student demonstrations of 2011 or the singles "Everything has an end" and "Spiritual Energy" which they became the most successful and popular songs of the album; "They're behind the curtain, those who steal all your power / very hidden can not be seen / who put forward are only the puppets" recounted the song about the deep crisis of political corruption in the country. "Altazores, a truly original band in the local context. With an energy and electric proposal, that's sometimes hypnotic." Emol.cl published the site in September, 2011.

During 2012, the impact of the album led Mauricio Herrera to work as a guitarist for various artists such as Francisco Gonzalez from the band Lucybell on the tour of his solo album "Here and Now" and also for Denisse Malebrán from the band Saiko on the tour of her album "My caravan" with whom participated on April 12, 2012, in the concert "A Song to remember" show that was held in the National Stadium of Chile on the occasion of the creation of a memorial for the victims the violation of human rights during the military dictatorship of Pinochet, with the participation of artists such as Pedro Aznar, Andrea Echeverri, Sun and Rain, Quilapayún, Congress, Ana Tijoux and Trey Spruance ( Mr. Bungle, Faith No More ).

=== Collective Feelings EP (2014) ===
On 26 July 2014, they released the album Collective Feeling EP self-released by the band, with the single "The right of free education". Altazores's fourth album was available for free in mp3 from their official website, making more than 2,000 downloads on two days. The album's sound is completely away from the melodic rock of their previous albums but getting closer to deep house and EDM but keeping contingent lyrics to the social environment of Chile. The album was written, recorded and mixed by Herrera in Eco Studios and featured the return of Patricio Gallardo, an original member of the group but now in charge of the bass and Sergio Carlini in the drums.

== Members ==
- Mauricio Herrera – guitar, vocals, piano, bass, drums
- Sergio Carlini – drums, percussion
- Nicolás Quinteros – piano, hammond, theremin
- Patricio Gallardo – bass, drums

== Discography ==
=== Albums ===
- 2008: El Silencio no es Callar
- 2011: The Secret behind Caos

=== EP ===
- 2010: Spiritual energy
- 2014: Collective Feelings

=== Compilation albums ===
- 2004: "Corporacion Cultural Balmaceda Arte Joven Winners"
- 2011: "Descúbrelos.cl" (Sello Azul)
- 2015: "Silentium" (Mute Magazine – Argentina)

=== Singles ===
- 2004: "Antes del Alba (Eclipse de sol)"
- 2007: "I can believe in you"
- 2008: "El Silencio no es Callar"
- 2008: "Sun Eclipse"
- 2008: "En el Firmamento"
- 2009: "Fallen tree / Deja vú"
- 2010: "The Redemption"
- 2011: "Spiritual Energy"
- 2011: "The best of you"
- 2011: "Vida Tirana"
- 2011: "Everything has an end"
- 2012: "Give me your drugs"
- 2014: "The right of a free education"

=== DVDs ===
- 2011: "Descúbrelos.cl" (Sello Azul)
- 2010: "Spiritual Energy EP"
