= Juan Halty =

Chilean footballer (born 1989)

Personal information
- Full name: Juan José Halty Sarobe
- Date of birth: 7 June 1989 (age 37)
- Place of birth: Santiago, Chile
- Height: 1.90 m (6 ft 3 in)
- Position: Goalkeeper

Youth career
- Universidad de Chile

Senior career*
Years	Team	Apps	(Gls)
2005–2008	Audax Italiano		
2008–2011	Universidad de Chile	0	(0)
2008	→ Unión Temuco (loan)		
2010	→ Provincial Talagante (loan)		
2011–2012	Curicó Unido		
2014–2015	Trasandino	10	(0)

International career
2008	Chile U20		

Managerial career
- 2016: Audax Italiano (gk coach)
- 2017: Santiago Wanderers (gk coach)
- 2018–2019: Universidad de Chile (gk coach)
- 2020–2025: Independiente del Valle (gk coach)
- * Club domestic league appearances and goals

Juan José Halty Sarobe (born 7 June 1989) is a Chilean former professional footballer who played as a goalkeeper.

== Playing career ==
Halty was born in Santiago, Chile. A product of Universidad de Chile youth system, Halty had a stint with Audax Italiano before being a reserve goalkepper for the club, when they won the 2009 Torneo Apertura. He never appeared in a league match for the club, playing on loan at Unión Temuco and Provincial Talagante, and finishing his playing career with lower league sides.

At international level, he represented the Chile national team at under-20 level in friendly matches against Peru in 2008.

== Coaching career ==
After he retired from playing, Halty became a goalkeeper coach. He initially worked with Audax Italiano, Santiago Wanderers and Universidad de Chile's youth teams, and after a chance encounter with the club's staff at a tournament in Ecuador, Halty joined C.S.D. Independiente del Valle as the senior side's goalkeeper coach. He left them in 2025.

== Personal life ==
Halty bears a resemblance to Chilean international goalkeeper Claudio Bravo and has appeared in Chilean television commercials as his double.

== Honours ==
Universidad de Chile

- Chilean Primera División: 2009 Apertura
