= Herman Chadwick Piñera =

Chilean politician (born 1945)

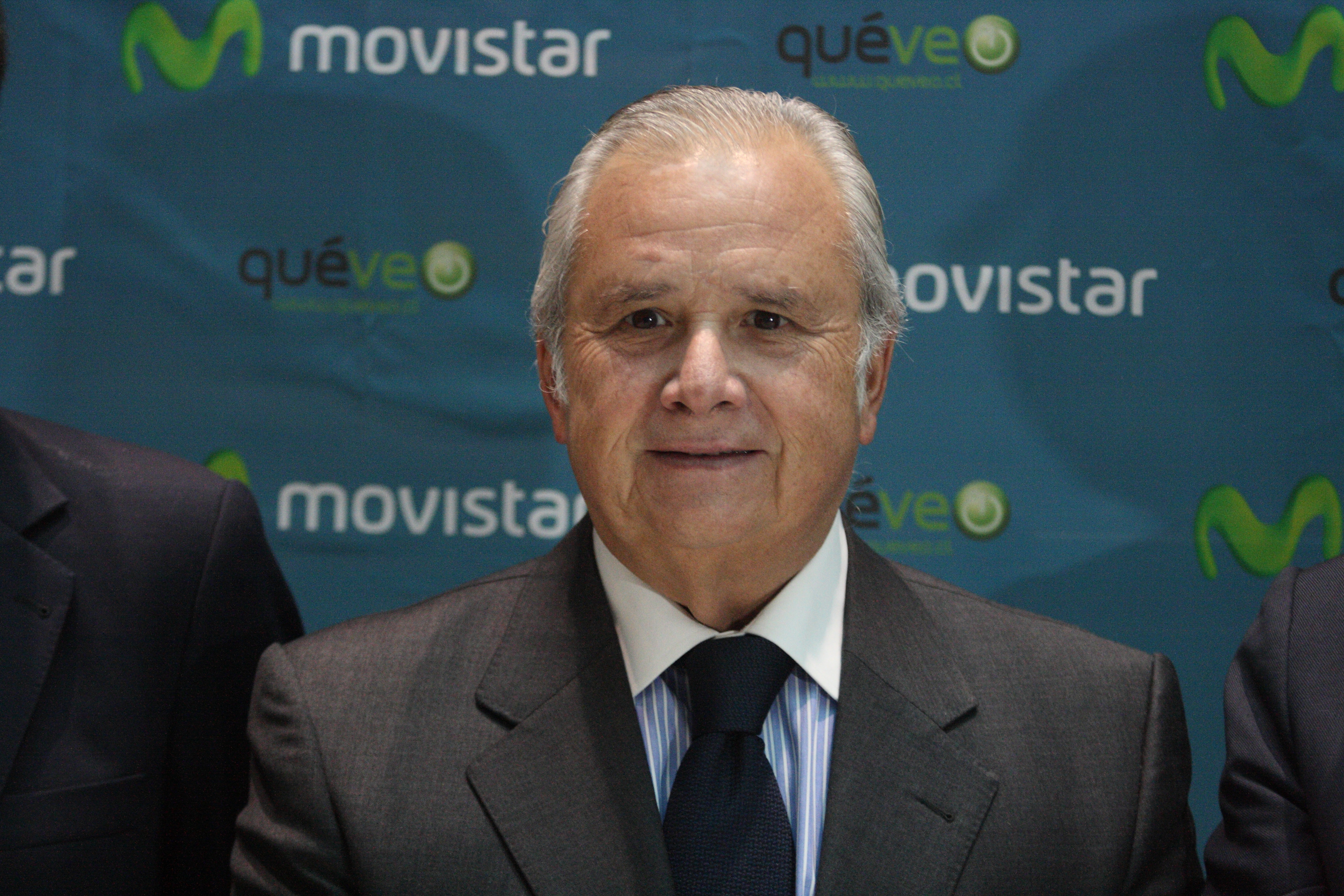
Image of Herman Chadwick

Herman José Manuel Chadwick Piñera (born April 16, 1945) is a Chilean lawyer, businessman, trade union leader and politician. He has served as mayor of the commune of Providencia, councilor for Santiago, president of the Association of Concessionaires of Public Infrastructure Works and the National Television Council of Chile (CNTV), and is currently president of the electricity company Enel.

He is currently president of the Board of Directors of University of the Americas (Chile) and Chairman of Enel Electric company.

== Family and studies ==
Herman comes from an upper-class family in Chile. He was the first of eight siblings born from the marriage between Herman Chadwick Valdés and Paulette Piñera Carvallo, the latter sister of the Archbishop of La Serena, Bernardino Piñera Carvallo, and the Christian Democrat engineer and politician Manuel José Piñera Carvallo. Herman is related to Manuel's sons, José, Sebastián, Pablo, and Miguel Piñera Echenique, through this blood relationship. He was a close friend of Sebastián Piñera, and his siblings include Andrés and María Teresa (wife of José Antonio Viera-Gallo).

He obtained his law degree from the Catholic University of Chile and married María Irene Larraín, also known as "Manene", after completing his education. The couple had four children together: Herman, María Irene, Francisco and Marcela. His son, Herman Chadwick Larraín, who was a well-known bankruptcy trustee, was found guilty in the Caval case in 2014.

== Political career ==
He worked in the private sector until 1981, when he was called by the dictatorship of General Augusto Pinochet to assume as mayor of Providencia, one of the highest income communes of the Chilean capital. Thus, at the age of 36, he became the youngest mayor of that commune.

In the 1980s, despite their marked political differences, Herman became close friends with Ricardo Lagos (PPD), who after the return to democracy would become minister to two presidents and later president of Chile between 2000 and 2006. In 1983, while Herman was a member of the first political commission of the right-wing Independent Democratic Union (UDI) party, Lagos was one of the leaders of the Democratic Alliance, a coalition opposed to the military dictatorship and the germ of the Concertation of Parties for Democracy (Concertación de Partidos por la Democracia). In 1984, both appeared on the panel of Improvisando, Jaime Celedón's political program on Radio Chilena.

In the 1989 parliamentary elections, Herman lost the race for the two senatorial seats to represent the Coquimbo Region. Subsequently, in the 1992 municipal elections, he ran for mayor of Santiago, being elected councilman with the first majority, after the elected mayor Jaime Ravinet (DC), who held that position between 1990 and 2000 and of whom he considers himself a "very good friend", as well as of Joaquín Lavín, Ravinet's successor between 2000 and 2004.

In 2001, the UDI nominated him for senator for the III constituency of the Atacama Region, but he was finally withdrawn to compensate for his cousin Sebastián Piñera (RN) from the VI Quinta Costa constituency of the Valparaíso Region.
