= Isleña Antumalen =

Chilean musician

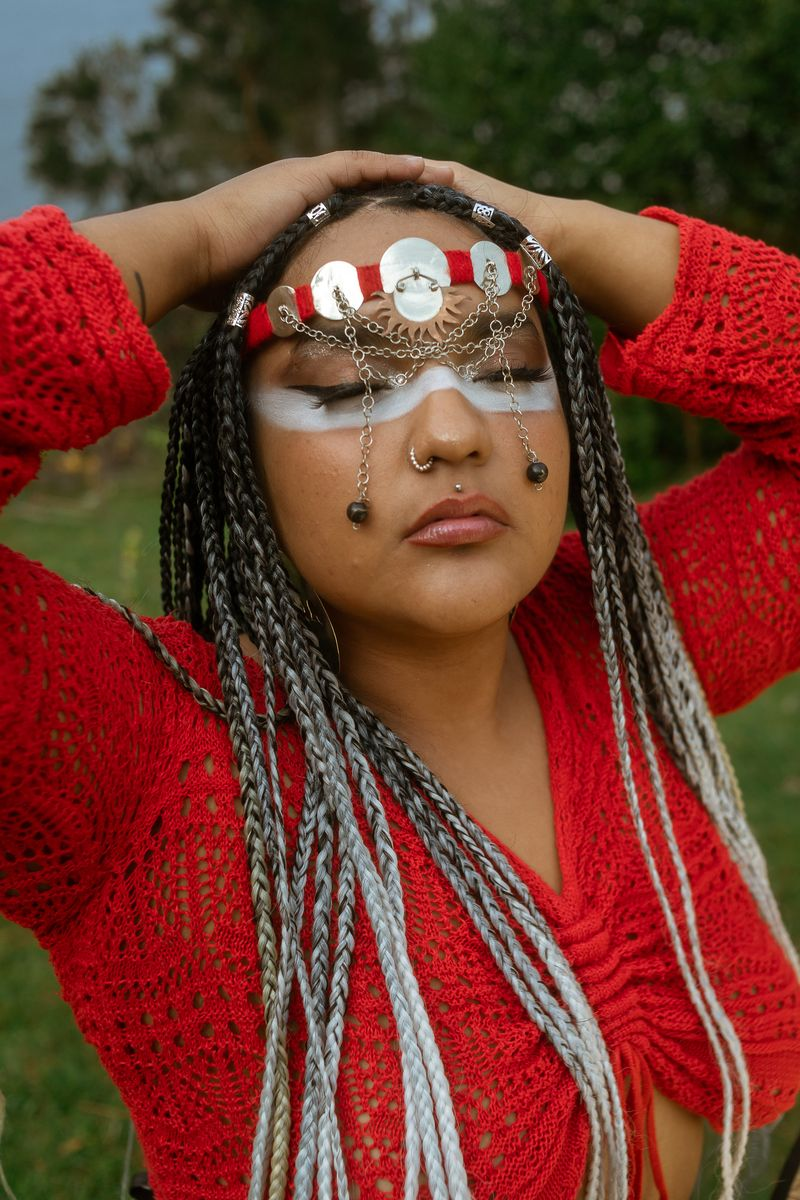

Background information
- Born: Antumalen Ayelen Antillanca Urrutia; 1998 (age 27–28); Huapi Island, Chile
- Years active: 2020–present
- Label: Everlasting

Antumalen Ayelen Antillanca Urrutia (born 1998), known by the stage name Isleña Antumalen, is a Chilean Huilliche singer, rapper, and activist.

== Biography ==
Isleña Antumalen was born Antumalen Ayelen Antillanca Urrutia on Huapi Island, Chile in 1998. She is Huilliche, a Mapuche ethnic group who are indigenous to southern South America. Isleña Antumalen explores themes of indigenous identity in her music. In 2024 she attended COP29 in Baku and was photographed by the Associated Press in her capacity as an indigenous attendee.

=== Music career ===
Isleña Antumalen began making music under that name in 2020. Her music has been described as having elements of many musical genres including rap, reggaeton, dembow, dub, afrobeat, cumbia, and perreo. In an interview with the Chilean Ministry of Cultures, Arts and Heritage, Isleña Antumalen said that her music "tries to show a bit of how a Mapuche girl lives her daily life on an island." She sings and raps in both Spanish and Mapudungun.

Isleña Antumalen performed at the first International Indigenous Music Summit held in the summer of 2023 in Toronto. Her debut album Ñaña was released in 2024 on Spanish record label Everlasting Records. The release of the album was preceded by the singles "Maki", "Ko", "Sureña Desakatá", and "Ñaña Descoloniza Tu Belleza". Mondo Sonoro rated the album 8/10.

The FARO group of music magazines named Isleña Antumalen one of their "Artists to Watch in 2024". (Note: FARO is an alliance of eight Iberian and Latin American music magazines including Indie Hoy and Mondo Sonoro.)

== Discography ==
Albums

- Ñaña (2024, Everlasting Records)

Singles

- "Ko" (2023)
- "Maki" (2024)
- "Sureña Desakatá" (2024)
- "Ñaña Descoloniza Tu Belleza" (2024)
