= Marcela Contreras =

Chilean-British immunologist, science writer, and educator

Dame Carmen Marcela Contreras Arriagada, DBE (born 4 January 1942) is a Chilean-born British leading blood expert, immunologist and university educator.

Born in Curicó in central Chile and raised in Coelemu, she originally obtained her M.D. degree from the Universidad de Chile, Santiago, in 1968. As a recipient of a British Council scholarship, she went to the UK in 1972 to study immunology and has remained there ever since. She retired in February 2007 as national director for diagnostics, development and research for the National Blood Service (NBS) after working for the organisation for over 20 years.

Her directorate consisted of nine functions, which included red cell immunohaematology; stem cells and immunotherapy; and histocompatibility and immunogenetics. She is Professor of transfusion medicine at the Royal Free Hospital Medical School, London. In January 2008 she was appointed President of the National Commission of Blood and Tissues of the Chilean Ministry of Health.

== Writings ==
Contreras has more than 370 publications to her name, including the textbook Blood Transfusion in Clinical Medicine, which she co-authored. She has been invited to lecture and chair sessions at international and national meetings in over 30 different countries.

== Honours ==
Contreras was named Dame Commander of the Order of the British Empire (DBE) for "services to medicine". She was elected a Fellow of the Academy of Medical Sciences in 2003.
