= Francisco Javier Quintanilla =

Francisco Javier Quintanilla (1833–?) was a Chilean priest. Born in Rancagua, he did his ecclesiastical studies at the Seminario Conciliar in Santiago. He published two notable religious works, Tradicionalismo and Historia de la Teolojia. He was a member of the Faculty of Theology and Sacred Sciences at the University of Chile.
