= Jennifer Rojas =

Chilean politician (born 1989)

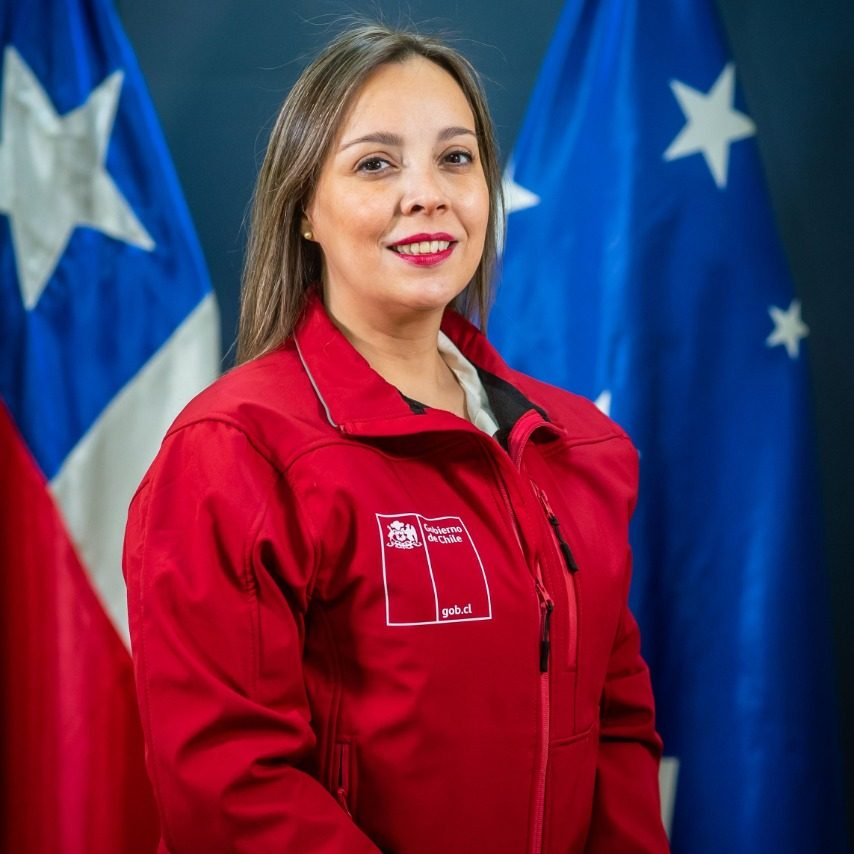

Regional Presidential Delegate of Magallanes and Chilean Antarctica
- In office July 14, 2021 – March 11, 2022
- Succeeded by: Luz Bermúdez Sandoval

Intendant of the Magallanes and Chilean Antarctic Region
- In office September 22, 2020 – July 14, 2021
- Preceded by: José Fernández Dübrock

Personal details
- Born: March 12, 1989; 37 years ago
- Party: Renovación Nacional
- Education: Universidad de Magallanes
- Occupation: Social worker and politician

Jennifer Carolina Rojas García is a social worker and politician, member of Renovación Nacional (RN). Between July 2021 and March 2022, she served as Presidential Delegate for the Region of Magallanes and Chilean Antarctica, under the presidency of Sebastián Piñera.

== Education ==
She graduated as a social worker from the University of Magallanes and later obtained a diploma in Human Resources Management and Direction from the Mariano Egaña University and a postgraduate degree in Social Mediation of Family Conflicts from the University of Chile.

== Career ==
Rojas worked as a social worker in the Magallanes Health Service and the Municipality of Punta Arenas.

Between 2012 and 2015, she served as regional director of the National Service for the Prevention and Rehabilitation of Drug and Alcohol Consumption (SENDA) and later held the position of regional coordinator of public security for the Magallanes Region, until 2020. On September 22 of that year, she was appointed by President Sebastián Piñera as mayor of the Region of Magallanes and Chilean Antarctica, after the resignation of José Fernández Dübrock due to the increase in cases of COVID-19 in the region.
