= Héctor Faúndez =

Chilean diplomat (1960–2007)

Héctor Faúndez Parra
- Born: 1960; Chillán, Chile
- Died: 3 March 2007; Damascus, Syria
- Occupation: Consul
- Spouse: Sylvia Borcherding (Separated)

Héctor Rodrigo Faúndez Parra was a Chilean diplomat. He served as consul and first secretary of the Embassy of Chile in Syria when he was killed.

== Education ==
His family moved to Santiago, where he studied at the Instituto Nacional General José Miguel Carrera. He studied in the United States under the Youth For Understanding program and again on a scholarship from Turner High School in Kansas. In 1978, he became a member of the National Honor Society.

He studied commercial engineering at the University of Chile before enrolling at the Diplomatic Academy of Chile in 1980.

== Diplomatic career ==
Faúndez worked in Chile's foreign service for 27 years. He was assigned twice to Syria and also served in Tunisia, Honduras, Nicaragua, Germany, and Kenya. In Santiago, he worked at the Ministry of Foreign Affairs in the Middle East, Consular Planning, Europe, Africa, and Middle East departments.

He was fluent in English, French, German, and Arabic. Faúndez was a specialist in the Arab-Israeli conflict.

== Murder ==
Héctor Faúndez’s body, found strangled and showing signs of assault, was discovered on 26 March 2007 in his apartment in the Malki neighborhood of Damascus. The Chilean embassy driver found his body after being sent by ambassador Ricardo Fiegelist, who was concerned about Faúndez’s absence from work.

On 3 April, Syrian police arrested the confessed perpetrator, indicating that the motive might not have been criminal. Two accomplices, who were later identified, remained at large.

The diplomat’s remains arrived in Chile on 4 April 2007, delayed by a public holiday in Syria. He was buried the same day.

== Personal life ==
His father was José Hugo Faúndez.

He was married to German citizen Sylvia Borcherding.

== See also ==
- Chile–Syria relations
