= Ariel Florencia Richards =

Chilean writer

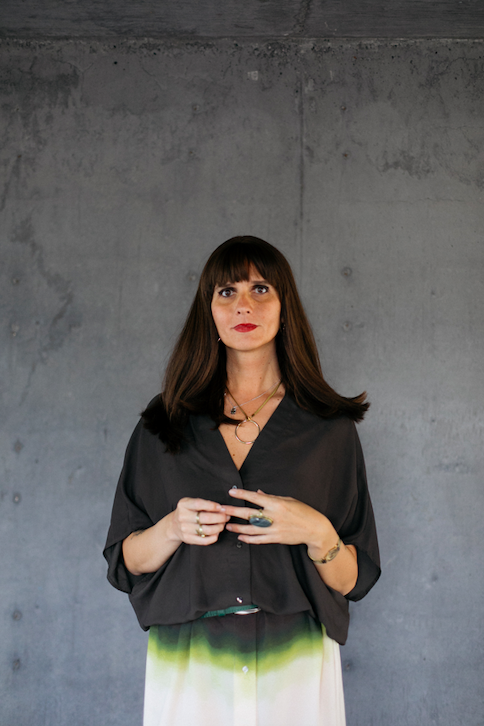
Ariel Florencia Richards

Ariel Florencia Richards (born April 19, 1981) is a Chilean writer and scholar of visual arts.

== Career ==
Richards is a recipient of the Bicentennial Fellowship, which supported her completion of a MFA in Creative Writing at New York University. She first published her poetry in pamphlets and zines which were presented at NY Art Book Fair and Santiago Museum of Contemporary Art. Her calligraphy is included in the Brooklyn Museum Libraries and Archives permanent collections.

Richards teaches writing and architecture at Universidad Diego Portales and is working toward a PhD at Pontificia Universidad de Chile. During the pandemic, she wrote her novel Inacabada [Unfinished], which was published in 2023. Set during a trip to New York city for a visual arts conference, the book explores the relationship between a mother and her daughter, Juana, a researcher of the arts who has begun her gender transition. While the narration moves between her past and present, Juana makes a second attempt to open up to her mother about her true gender identity.

In 2023 she was a doctoral fellow at the Canadian Centre for Architecture, where she studied the personal papers of architect Gordon Matta-Clark for three months. From that residency, she wrote an essay book that crosses biography with essay and novel, entitled Gordon Matta-Clark. Contra viejas superficies [Against Old Surfaces].

== Personal life ==
Richards is a transgender woman and transitioned in 2018, at age 37. Her third book, Inacabada [Unfinished], is the first she published after transition.

== Writing ==
- Trasatlántico (Editorial Cuneta, 2015)
- Las olas son las mismas [The Waves are the Same] (Los Libros de la Mujer Rota, first published 2016, reprinted in 2021 under her name after her transition)
- Inacabada [Unfinished] (Alfaguara, 2023)
- Gordon Matta-Clark. Contra viejas superficies [Gordon Matta-Clark. Against old surfaces] (Metales Pesados, 2024)
