= Adolfo Quirós =

Chilean poet and public servant

Adolfo Quiros (February 1, 1853 – 1910) was a Chilean poet and public servant.
