= Luis Jiménez (footballer, born 1987) =

Chilean footballer (born 1987)

Personal information
- Full name: Luis Raúl Jiménez Barrera
- Date of birth: 30 January 1987 (age 39)
- Place of birth: Santiago, Chile
- Height: 1.74 m (5 ft 9 in)
- Position: Central midfielder

Youth career
- 2001–2007: Deportes Melipilla

Senior career*
Years	Team	Apps	(Gls)
2007–2010	Deportes Melipilla	48	(3)
2011	Unión La Calera	8	(0)
2012	Cobresal	12	(1)
2013	Lota Schwager	7	(0)
Total		75	(4)
- * Club domestic league appearances and goals

Luis Raúl Jiménez Barrera (born 30 January 1987) is a Chilean former footballer who played as a central midfielder.

== Career ==
He played for then Primera División de Chile club Cobresal. as left midfielder.

Product of Deportes Melipilla youth ranks, he was promoted to the first adult team by the coach Luis Musrri in January 2007 for play the Apertura Tournament of that year. After the relegation of his team to the Primera B and then, unfortunately to the Tercera División, three years later, Jiménez Barrera signed for Unión La Calera, team that play in the first tier of the country in that season.

In January 2012, he signed for Cobresal, club based in El Salvador at the Atacama Desert. One of the reasons of his arrival was due to Luis Musrri, coach of that club that directed him at Deportes Melipilla in 2007.
