= Andrés Parada =

Chilean footballer (born 1984)

Personal information
- Full name: Andrés Antonio Parada Barrera
- Date of birth: 20 March 1984 (age 42)
- Place of birth: Santiago, Chile
- Height: 1.80 m (5 ft 11 in)
- Position: Goalkeeper

Senior career*
Years	Team	Apps	(Gls)
2004–2005	Universidad Católica		
2006	→ Copiapó (loan)		
2007–2008	→ Osorno (loan)		
2009	O'Higgins		
2010	San Luis de Quillota		
2011	Santiago Morning		
2011–2012	Iquique		
2012–2013	Barnechea		
- * Club domestic league appearances and goals as of 18 March 2020

Andrés Antonio Parada Barrera (born 20 March 1984) is a Chilean footballer.

He played for Deportes Iquique.

== Honours ==
=== Club ===
Universidad Católica

- Primera División de Chile (1): 2005 Clausura

Provincial Osorno

- Primera B (1): 2007
