= Guillermo Saavedra (poet) =

Argentine poet, editor and journalist

Guillermo Aníbal Saavedra (born October 7, 1960) is an Argentine poet, editor and journalist.

He is editor of the literary supplements of newspapers La Razón and Clarin, and correspondent of the cultural supplement of El País de Montevideo.

== Awards ==
- 2001 Guggenheim Fellowship grant.

== Works ==
- Caracol Ediciones Ultimo Reino, 1989, ISBN 9789509418769
- Tentativas sobre Cage (La Marca, 1995)
- El velador (Bajo La Luna Nueva, 1998)
- La voz inútil: poemas (1980–2003), Bajo la luna, 2003, ISBN 9789509992962

=== Poetry books for children ===
- Pancitas argentinas (Alfaguara, 2000)
- Cenicienta no escarmienta (Alfaguara, 2003)

=== Interviews with Argentine writers ===
- La curiosidad impertinente (Beatriz Viterbo, 1993)

=== Anthologies ===
- Cuentos de historia argentina (Alfaguara, 1998)
- La pena del aire (poemas de Ricardo E. Molinari) (Mondadori, 2000)
- Cuentos escogidos de Andrés Rivera (Alfaguara, 2000)
- Mi cuento favorito (Alfaguara, 2000)
- Cuentos de escritoras argentinas Alfaguara, 2001, ISBN 9789505116799
- El placer rebelde: antología general, Fondo de Cultura Económica, 2003, ISBN 9789505575756
- four anthologies included in the series Vamos a leer published by the Argentine Secretary of Culture (2001).
