= Gabriela Bussenius =

Chilean writer and filmmaker

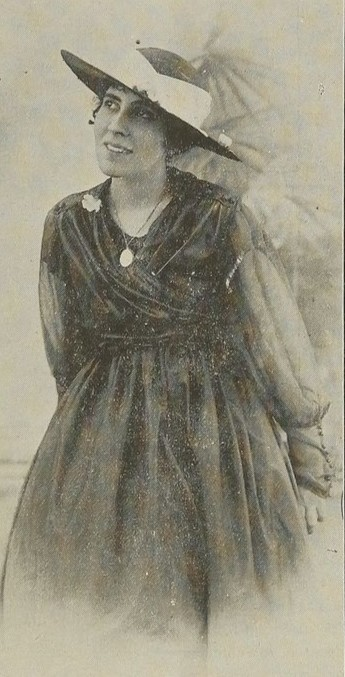
Gabriela von Bussenius Vega

Gabriela von Bussenius Vega (1901–1975) was a Chilean journalist, writer and filmmaker, "Latin America's first woman film-maker".

== Life ==
Gaby von Bussenius started writing articles and film reviews for Zig-Zag magazine as a girl. In 1916 she married Salvador Giamastiani, one of the owners of the filmmaking company Chile Films. She wrote La agonía de Arauco, directing it with her husband in 1917: she was in charge of the story and art direction, and he was in charge of technical direction. The film treated the capitalist exploitation of the indigenous Mapuche people of Araucanía: following a woman who suffers the loss of her beloved husband and son.

Von Busseniu continued anonymous collaboration on films with her husband until his death in 1921. She did not subsequently continue working on film but kept up activity as a writer. She edited the magazines Mundo Social and Cinema Magazine, and wrote plays and a novel. She later spent many years in a retirement home, dying on January 28, 1975.

== Filmography ==
- La agonía de Arauco / The Agony of Arauco, 1917.

== Bibliography ==
=== Plays ===
- El regreso (The Return)
- La torre de Babel (The Tower of Babel)

=== Novels ===
- Mis amigos los cisnes (My Friends the Swans)
