= Sergio Saavedra =

Chilean engineer and politician (1927–2022)

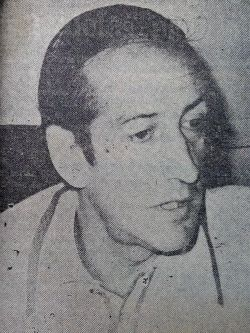

Member of the Chamber of Deputies of Chile
- In office 15 May 1973 – 21 September 1973
- Constituency: Talagante

Personal details
- Born: Sergio Saavedra Viollier; 13 July 1927 Santiago, Chile
- Died: 29 November 2022 (aged 95) Santiago, Chile
- Party: PDC
- Education: University of Chile
- Occupation: Engineer

Sergio Saavedra Viollier (13 July 1927 – 29 November 2022) was a Chilean engineer and politician. A member of the Christian Democratic Party, he served in the Chamber of Deputies from May to September 1973.

Saavedra died in Santiago on 29 November 2022.

== Biography ==
He was born in Santiago to Abel Saavedra Varas and Rosa Viollier Waugh. He earned a degree in civil engineering from the University of Chile in 1952. He was married to Victoria Eugenia Florez Florez and had seven children, including journalist Consuelo Saavedra.

Saavedra worked for CORFO as a groundwater engineer, participated in the SEDESCO prefabricated housing project, and held leadership roles in private and public infrastructure firms.

He joined the Christian Democratic Party, serving in local leadership and as Intendant of Santiago. In 1973, he was elected Deputy, but the coup terminated his role. He was part of the «Group of Thirteen» Christians Democrats opposed to the coup.
