= Juan Chandía =

Chilean politician (1892–1964)

Juan Chandía (1892 – 1964) was a Chilean politician. During the presidency of Gabriel Gonzalez Videla, Chandía served as the governor of Tomé between 1946 and 1952.
