= El Monteaguilino =

Chilean folklorist and television host

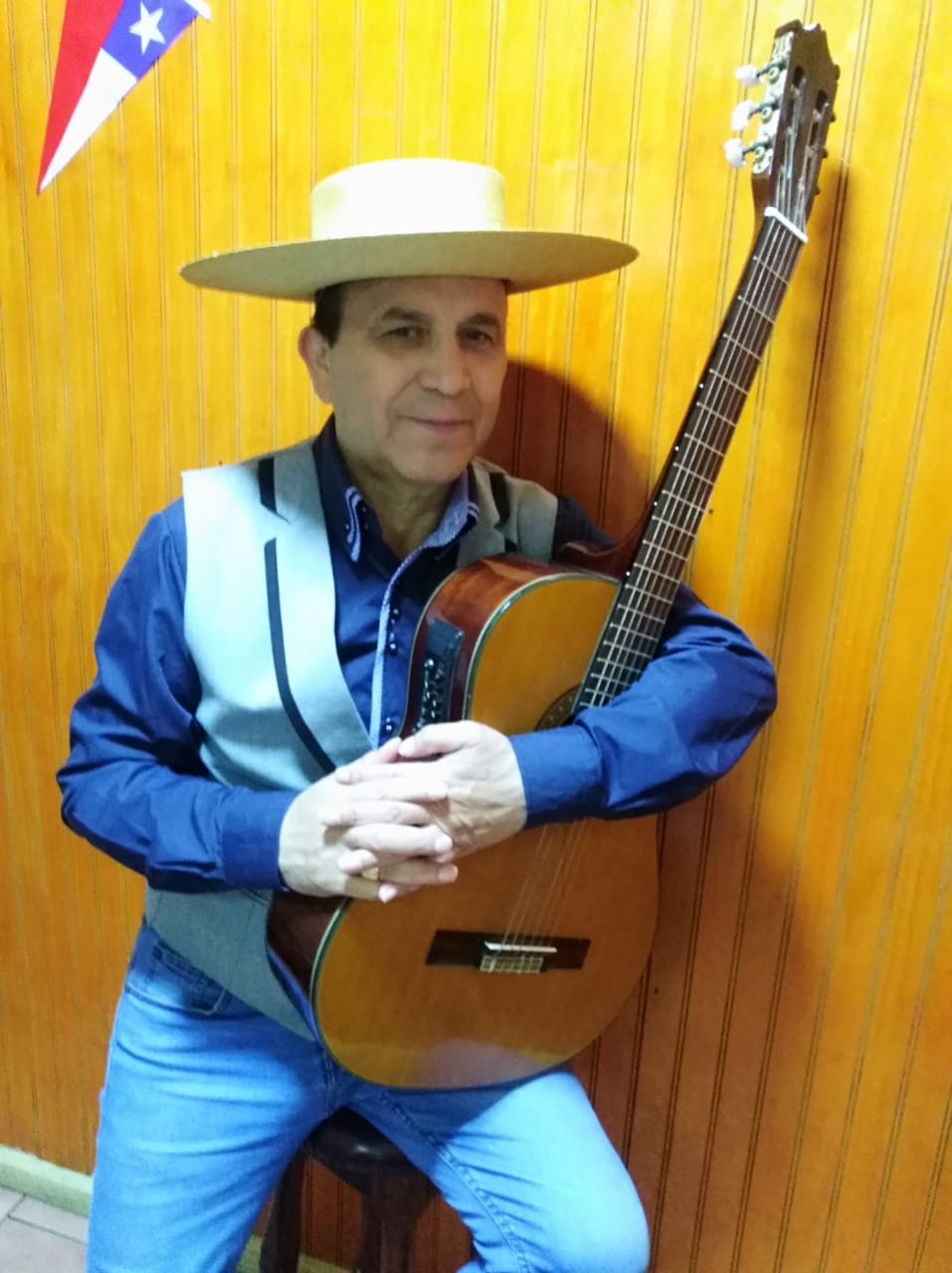

Background information
- Born: José Heriberto Sepúlveda Beltrán; September 27, 1960 (age 65); Monte Águila, Chile
- Genres: Cueca, guaracha
- Occupations: Folklorist; television presenter
- Years active: 1988–present
- Label: Sony Music Entertainment
- Website: www.monteaguilino.cl (in Spanish)

José Heriberto Sepúlveda Beltrán (born September 27, 1960), also known as El Monteaguilino, is a Chilean folklorist and television host.

== Biography ==
José Sepúlveda was born on September 27, 1960, in Monte Águila, Chile. He is the son of María Beltrán Bobadilla and José Sepúlveda Padilla, and he has 7 brothers.

=== Artistic career ===
He made his debut in 1988 at the Viña del Mar International Song Festival, where he performed the song "El Caballito de Metal", based on the Chilean railway industry and the peasant world. The song, which was a guaracha, was disqualified, because at that time the competition regulations required that the songs sung be typical of Chilean folklore, a requirement that the guaracha did not fulfill. However, the song he played became iconic and allowed him to continue in the field of folk music, of which he is still a part today.

Between 2012 and 2015, he was a television host on the program Revoliendo el Gallinero, on the UCV TV channel, which consisted of interviewing other singers around the country.

Even though he has been accused of writing a song dedicated to Lucía Hiriart, Augusto Pinochet's wife, he has denied it, claiming that "I like politics, but from afar."

In 2020, due to the COVID-19 pandemic, he has begun to record and broadcast his works digitally. He was also invited to the TV marathon Vamos Chilenos.

== Discography ==
| Year | Title | Type |
|---|---|---|
| 1988 | A Bailar Guaracha | Album |
| 1997 | Morena Caribeña | Album |
| 1998 | Las Cuecas Acaballás | Album |
| 2002 | Hass presenta: Música 100% Chilena | Album |
| 2003 | A Ponerle Pino... Con El Clavel y El Monteaguilino | Collaborative |
| 2003 | A Todo Ritmo | Album |
| 2004 | Lo Mejor de El Monteaguilino | Compilation |
| 2010 | ¡Arriba la selección! | Album |
| 2013 | La Mejor Fiesta Dieciochera | Collaborative |
| 2013 | Caballito de Metal | Compilation |
