= Norambuena =

Norambuena is a Chilean surname. Notable people with the surname include:

- Alexis Norambuena (born 1984), Chilean-Palestinian footballer
- Álvaro Arriagada Norambuena, Chilean academic and government official
- Arturo Norambuena (born 1971), Chilean football manager and player
- Gabriel Norambuena (born 2003), Chilean footballer
- Iván Norambuena (born 1958), Chilean politician
- Leopoldo Soto Norambuena (born 1964), Chilean physicist
- Mauricio Hernández Norambuena (born 1958), Chilean revolutionary
