= Federico Santa María Technical University =

Chilean university

- Universidad Técnica Federico Santa María
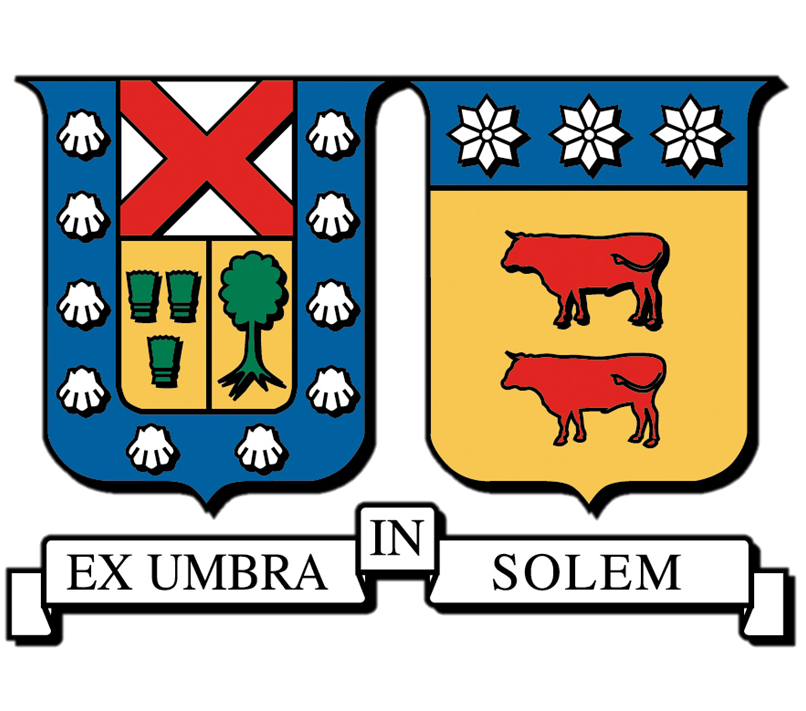
- Former name: Escuela de Artes y Oficios y el Colegio de Ingenieros José Miguel Carrera (1926–1935)
- Motto: Ex umbra in Solem
- Motto in English: From the shadows to the light
- Type: Private (traditional), technical
- Established: 20 December 1931 (94 years ago)
- Academic affiliations: Cruz del sur Network; G9 Network; Clover 2030 Engineering
- Chairman: Roberto Medina Cantariño
- Rector: Juan Yuz Eissmann (2022-2026)
- Faculty: 618 (equivalent full time 2019)
- Students: 19,291 (2020)
- Undergraduates: 18,239
- Postgraduates: 1,052
- Location: Valparaíso, Santiago, Viña del Mar, Concepción, Chile; 33.0351°S 71.5963°W
- Campus: Urban 14.82 hectares (36.6 acres)
- Architect: Smith Solar & Smith Miller
- Colours: Blue, red, yellow
- Website: www.utfsm.cl/en/
- ASN: 26610

The Federico Santa María Technical University (Spanish: Universidad Técnica Federico Santa María, UTFSM, or simply Santa Maria University) is a Chilean university member of the Rector's Council (CRUCh), founded in 1931 in Valparaíso, Chile.

The university has campuses in Valparaiso, Viña del Mar, Santiago (Vitacura and San Joaquín) and Concepcion. The Federico Santa María Technical University is the alma mater of several prominent businessmen, engineers and Chilean scientists. Its students and alumni are known as "Sansanos".

The UTFSM was the first Chilean university to confer a doctorate in engineering in 1962 and the first higher-education institution in Latin America to confer this degree. The UTFSM university radio is the oldest campus radio in Latin America.

The university admission is very competitive and, it is known for its rigorous study requirements, demanding study program. For the years 2011–2016, the UTFSM has an undergraduate retention rate of 82% by the first year of studies, and a 66% by the second year. Less than 1% of its students are international, and most of the available courses are imparted in Spanish.

The graduation date is held on 20 December every year, since it commemorates the anniversary of the death of the founder, Federico Santa Maria Carrera, on 20 December 1925.

== History ==
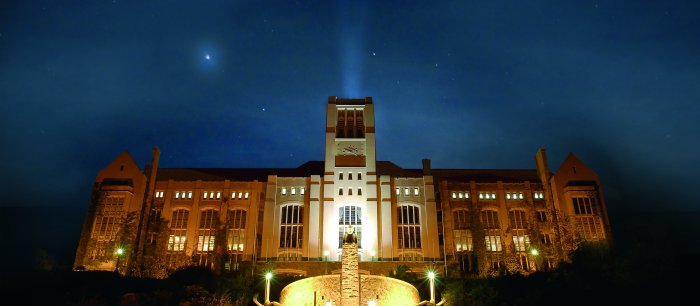
Main UTFSM Campus in Valparaiso, 2016

The university takes its name from Federico Santa María, a Chilean philanthropist that lived in France. He raised a huge fortune as a broker in the sugar market in Paris. Before his death, he donated all his fortune to create a university in Valparaíso, his hometown. Although the exact amount of his fortune is unknown, it is believed to have been around 27 billion dollars of today's currency. While in Paris in 1920, in his testament, Santa María donated his fortune with the idea of building a high-standard technical and scientific institution.

In his will, Santa María manifested that his desired executors contribute to material progress and expand Chile's cultural horizons; altruistic ideas which sought to facilitate entry into the academic life of outstanding compatriots dispossessed but without further requirement than merit, skills and high academic achievement. This institution would accept and prepare the best students from all socioeconomic backgrounds to gain technical and scientific knowledge that contribute to the progress of the country.

The executors were chosen by Santa María to be Agustin Edwards Mac-Clure, Juan Brown Caces, Carlos van Buren and Andrew Geddes.

Following his philosophy, on March 31, 1926, an institution was created to develop Santa María's legacy. In 1931, the School of Crafts and Arts and School of Engineering José Miguel Carrera was founded. In 1935, its name changed to Universidad Técnica Federico Santa María.

The condition imposed by Federico Santa María was that, during the first 10 years, the university must receive academics from the best schools of sciences and engineering. Following this imperative, the executor of this project, Agustín Edwards Mac-Clure, traveled to Germany where he contacted Karl Laudien, at the time rector of a technical school in the Western Pemerania region, and he became the first rector of the university. From that moment, the university received a strong German influence in its engineering education. Several German engineers and scientists arrived before and after the second world war from institutions such as TU Berlin, Berlin University, and Leipzig University among other German institutions. They brought to the university cutting edge knowledge in physics, chemistry and engineering. For example, Arnold Keller, professor of the Physics department at UTFSM, was involved in the development of the V-1 rockets during the second world war, as part of the team of Wernher von Braun. Research in new areas to the country such as Solar Energy, or Chemistry of Natural Products were created, which delivered two Nacional Science Prize awards, Herbert Appel in 1970, and Juan Garbarino in 1998.

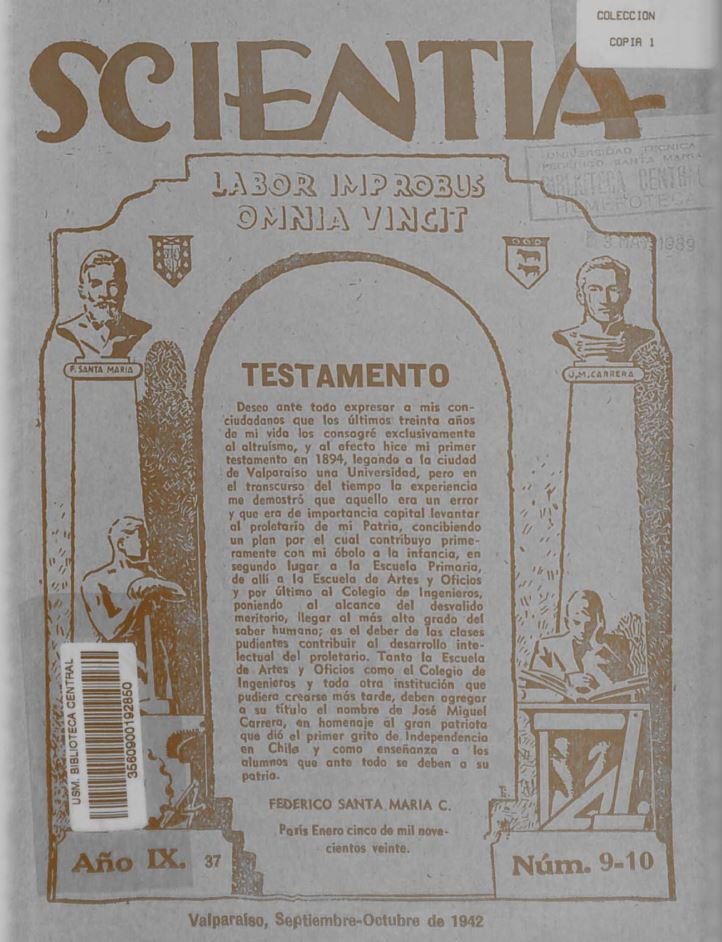
Scientia Magazine

In 1934, the Scientia magazine is published, becoming the voice for the university's academic work.

In 1937, the Universidad Tecnica Federico Santa Maria Radio was created, becoming the first university radio broadcaster in Chile and Latin America, focused to broadcasting information and cultural programs. The radio still broadcasts to this day, in the AM: 1.450 and FM: 99,7 signals in the Valparaiso region. The radio also has an online signal.

In 1939, the Alumni association was founded, known today as AEXA (Asociación de Ex-Alumnos).

In 1960, the Graduate School was created, and its first director was Herbert Appel (1960-1964), offering the PhD study lines for chemical, electrical and mechanical engineering. In 1963 the university became the first higher-education institution in Latin America to confer a doctorate in engineering, in cooperation with the University of Pittsburgh. In the 1960s the university started a strategy of national and international expansion. In 1966 the Technical campus "Viña del Mar" was founded. In 1972 the campus "Rey Balduino de Bélgica" in the southeast city of Concepción with orientation in technical-professional areas was founded. The project received strong financial support from Baudouin King.

In 1964, the university grants for the first time a technical degree to a woman, the chemical technician Patricia Guzman. In 1965 Graciela Muñoz graduates as its first female engineer.

The UTFSM was the first university of the 8 existing universities in Chile at the time to restart its operations on 15 October 1973, after the Military coup of 11 September 1973.

== Campuses ==
The university has three campuses and two branch campuses (sedes):

1. Casa Central, main campus. Inaugurated in 1931 in Valparaíso
2. Campus Vitacura, Inaugurated in 1995 in Vitacura, Santiago, Chile.
3. Campus San Joaquín. Inaugurated in 2009 in San Joaquin, Santiago, Chile.
4. Sede José Miguel Carrera, located in Viña del Mar.
5. Sede Rey Balduino de Bélgica, Inaugurated in 1972 in Talcahuano, Chile.

While the campuses are focused on undergraduate, graduate and university academical activities, sedes are mainly dedicated to technical degrees.

Additionally the UTFSM started in 1996 a Campus located in Guayaquil, Ecuador, from an agreement with the Universidad Laica Eloy Alfaro de Manta, campus which closed in 2018, with the infrastructure being taken over by a newly created university, Universidad del Rio. Around 600 students in 2019 expect to be graduated by 2023, process which will lead to the definitive closure of UTFSM Activities in Ecuador.

=== Main campus, Valparaíso ===
The main UTFSM campus (or Casa Central) is located in Valparaíso, covering most of the front area of Los Placeres hill, on the grounds of the former Pudeto fort. The site faces the Pacific coast and it is visible from many parts of the bay of Valparaíso.

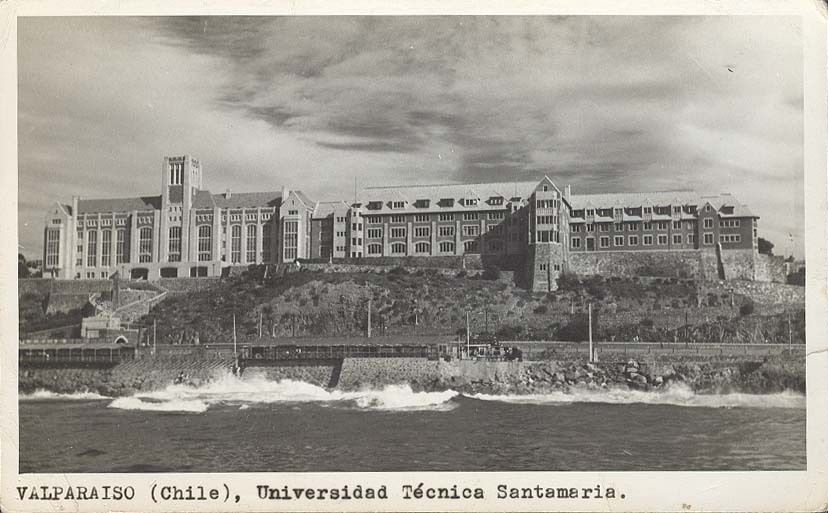
Main Campus in Valparaíso, 1949

The building was designed by Josué Smith Solar, one of the most respected Chilean architects of the 20th century, and his son José Smith Miller. The American Neo-Gothic style campus is considered one of the foremost works of Chilean architecture. The campus is also recognised for its gardening, with native and exotic species.

In 2001, the illumination of the university frontis was renewed through a contest organised by the Chilean branch of Philips.

The main campus has a gothic scholastic architecture with a privileged view to the Pacific Ocean. This campus includes more than 3 hectares of green areas making it the biggest urban park in Valparaiso, despite it being closed to the public. In 2008 it was chosen as one of the most remarkable national architectural works of the 20th century.

=== Branch campus Viña del Mar, "José Miguel Carrera" ===
In the 1960s, the university formulated an expansion plan. With financial assistance from the Inter-American Development Bank (IDB), the support of the Ford Foundation, advice from Dunwoody Industrial Institute in the US, and a donation of land by Chile's Agricultural Development Institute INDAP (from the Spanish "Instituto de Desarrollo Agropecuario"), a fully furnished building was constructed in 1971 in Viña del Mar, and it was named the "Jose Miguel Carrera" branch campus, following the testamentary vision of the university founder, the philanthropist Federico Santa María.

This branch is located on the border between the communes of Vina del Mar and Quilpué in Chile.

=== Branch campus Concepción, "Rey Baduino de Belgica" ===
By the mid-1960s, the university planned to install six schools in different parts of the country.

In October 1965, the Kings of Belgium, Baudouin I and Fabiola de Mora y Aragon visited the university headquarters in Valparaíso, were introduced to its educational project and as a result initiated conversations for the construction of a branch campus in the city of Concepción.

Meanwhile, our country strengthens their contributions: the government facilitates the exchange of funds provided by Belgium; local businesses such as the San Pedro Sawmills, Cementos Bio Bio, Pacific Steel Company, Fanaloza, Inchalam, Pizarreño, Glasses Lirquén, among others, also contributed in its construction. Additionally, a donation of Archbishop of Concepción provided the land needed for the building construction. Its construction began in 1969.

Academic activities started on April 26, 1971, offering the careers of Electronics, Electrical, Structural Mechanics, Maintenance Mechanics, and Chemistry. On February 14, 1972, the campus branch was inaugurated solemnly in the presence of the President of Chile, Salvador Allende Gossens, and the university rector, Jaime Chiang Acosta.

== Academic rankings and accreditation ==
The UTFSM has been historically perceived as one of the most prestigious engineering schools in the country and more recently, with the appearance of national and international rankings, has been placed among the top Universities in Chile and Latin America. The UTFSM has consistently been considered as one of the best engineering universities in Latin America, and appears regularly as a highly ranked university in many of the published world university rankings.

- For 10 consecutive years, UTFSM has been ranked among the three best Universities in Chile in terms of quality perception given by more than 1000 important national business executives.
- In 2012, the university was ranked 5 between 9,500 schools of engineering in the world according to their impact factor in the last 5 years (Microsoft Academics), as the latinoamerican university with the largest normalized impact factor, and as the first school of engineering in South America.
- According to Times Higher Education Ranking UTFSM has been decreasing its ranking from being among the 251-275 best Universities in the World in 2015, to being between the 1201-1500 best universities. Its THE ranking for the UTFSM in Latin America has decreased from #13 in 2016, to #49 in 2022.
- In 2019, the UTFSM was ranked 2nd in Latin America in the Times Higher Education (THE) world ranking for Engineering and Technology.
- US News has ranked the UTFSM as #64 in the Best Global Universities ranking, #15 in the Best Universities in Latin America ranking, and #3 in the Best Universities in Chile ranking.

University rankings

Global – Overall
- QS World: 1001-1200
- THE World: 1201-1500
- USNWR Global: 429

Regional – Overall
- QS Latin America: 34
- THE Latin America: 24

=== Accreditations ===
- Chilean National Accreditation commission CNA: 6 years until December 2022

== Organization ==
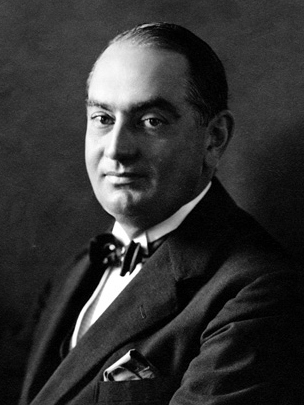
Agustin Edwards Mc-Clure, the first UTFSM Directive Council President, 1931

=== Directive council ===
As of 2025, the president of the UTFSM Directive Council is Ms. Yessica Cartagena. The following table summarizes the different presidents the UTFSM has had in its history.

Directive Council President	Start Year
Yessica Cartagena	2025
Roberto Medina Cantariño	2014
Sergio Solis Mateluna	2010
Horacio Pavez García	2002
Isidoro Lazárraga Leanza	1992
Jorge Swett	1987
Military Junta	1973-1986
Carlos Massad Abud	1968
Agustin Edwards Eastman	1956
Agustin Edwards Budge	1941
Agustin Edwards Mac-Clure	1931

=== Rector ===
The current rector is Professor Juan I. Yuz Eissmann, professor of electronic engineering at UTFSM was ratified as the new rector of the university for the period 2022–2026. Some notable events:

- Two rectors died at the time of having the role, i.e., Armando Quezada in 1936, and Commander Juan Naylor in 1977. They were replaced by Interim Rectors until a new rector was chosen through a vote.
- One rector have had to resign due to protests within the university, i.e., Carlos Cerutti in 1968.
- Three "delegate" rectors were designated by a military junta. During the Military regime of Augusto Pinochet (1973-1990) the university rector was designated by the military junta instead of a normal voting process. Three "delegate rectors", retired military men, had this role during the period: Commander Juan Naylor (1973-1977), Vice-admiral Ismael Huerta (1977-1985) and Commander Arturo Niño de Zepeda (1985-1989).
- Two of the rectors were siblings, i.e., Jaime Chiang Acosta (1968-1972), and Gustavo Chiang Acosta (1989-1993).
- Jaime Chiang Acosta (1969-1972) was the first rector chosen through a voting process in the university community.
- Jaime Chiang Acosta (1969-1972) was the first rector that was also a UTFSM alumnus, a Civil Chemical Engineering graduate (1952) with a PhD from the University of Louisiana.
- Gustavo Chiang Acosta (1989-1993), a UTFSM civil mechanical engineer graduated in 1949, was also the first rector chosen by popular vote of the university community after the end of the Pinochet military regime.
- A candidate for rector needs to obtain at least 60% of the votes in an election from the Full Board (Claustro Pleno, constituted of all academics at the university) to be elected directly, otherwise the decision remains with the Directive Board. This mechanism has been used in several elections, but the board usually confirms the voting mayority, such as in the case of Jose Rodriguez vs. Raul Steigmeyer in 2010, and in the case of Darcy Fuenzalida vs. Marcello Visconti in 2014.
- During the election for rector in 1993, a tight election between Manfred Max-Neef and Adolfo Arata gave the former a 1-vote victory in the first election round, and a 2-vote victory during the second round. In this case the Directive Board chose to award the election to Adolfo Arata.

Rector Name	Period
Juan Ignacio Yuz Eissmann	2022-2026
Darcy Fuenzalida O'Shee	2014-2022
Jose Rodriguez Perez	2006-2014
Jose Rodriguez Perez (Interim)	2005-2006
Giovanni Pesce Santana	2001-2005
Adolfo Arata Andreani	1993-2001
Gustavo Chiang Acosta	1989-1993
Arturo Niño de Zepeda Schele (delegate)	1985-1989
Ismael Huerta Diaz (delegate)	1977-1985
Juan Naylor Wieber (delegate)	1973-1977+
Domingo Santa Maria Santa Cruz	1972-1973
Jaime Chiang Acosta	1969-1972
Wilhem Feick (Interim)	1968-1969
Carlos Ceruti Gardeazábal	1959-1968 (R)
Julio Hirschmann	1958-1959
Francisco Cereceda Cisternas (Engineering School)	1937-1958
Armando Quezada Acharán (Engineering School)	1936 +
Karl Laudien (Crafts school)	1935-1938

=== Academic departments ===
Due to the focused nature of the university, its organisation currently does not include different faculties, only different academic departments, which carry out research and graduate/undergraduate educational programs. Originally, faculties had been considered in the university organization, with the founding of the first three faculties in 1944, Chemical, Mechanical and Electrical Engineering. Faculties were subsequently abolished under Adolfo Arata's period as rector.

Academic Department	Year founded
Mechanical Engineering	1944
Chemical Engineering	1944
Electrical Engineering	1944
Construction Engineering	1959
Chemical and Environmental Engineering	19XX
Metallurgical Engineering	1965
Computer Engineering / Informatics	1975
Electronic Engineering	1982
Industrial Engineering	1988
Commercial Engineering	1996
Architecture	1996

Within the Chilean campus level, there are 17 different academic departments, though not all of them are in every campus location, and not all degree levels are offered at every location, as the following table shows:

Academic Department	Valparaiso Campus Main Campus	Concepción Campus "Rey Baduino de Belgica"	Viña del Mar Campus "José Miguel Carrera"	Santiago Campus
Architecture	Yes	-	-	-
Metallurgical Engineering and Materials	Yes	-	-	-
Electrical Engineering	Yes	Yes	-	Yes
Electronic Engineering	Yes	Yes	-	-
Physics	Yes	-	-	Yes
Industrial Engineering	Yes	-	-	Yes
Commercial Engineering	Yes	-	-	Yes
Computer Science Engineering	Yes	-	Yes	Yes
Mathematics	Yes	-	-	Yes
Mechanical Engineering	Yes	Yes	Yes	Yes
Civil Engineering and Construction	Yes	Yes	Yes	Yes
Chemical and Environmental Engineering	Yes	-	Yes	Yes
Chemistry	Yes	Yes	-	Yes
Physical Education, sports and recreation	Yes	-	-	Yes
Humanist Studies	Yes	-	-	Yes
Product Design engineering	Yes	-	Yes	-
Aeronautic Science	-	-	-	Yes

UTFSM is the only Chilean engineering school where sports is an obligatory course in the curriculum during the first three semesters of all its study lines at its Valparaiso and Santiago Campuses.

The university offers careers of Commercial Pilot and Aeronautical Engineering in its Academia de Ciencias Aeronáuticas in a joint venture with Chilean airline Lan Chile.

== Education ==
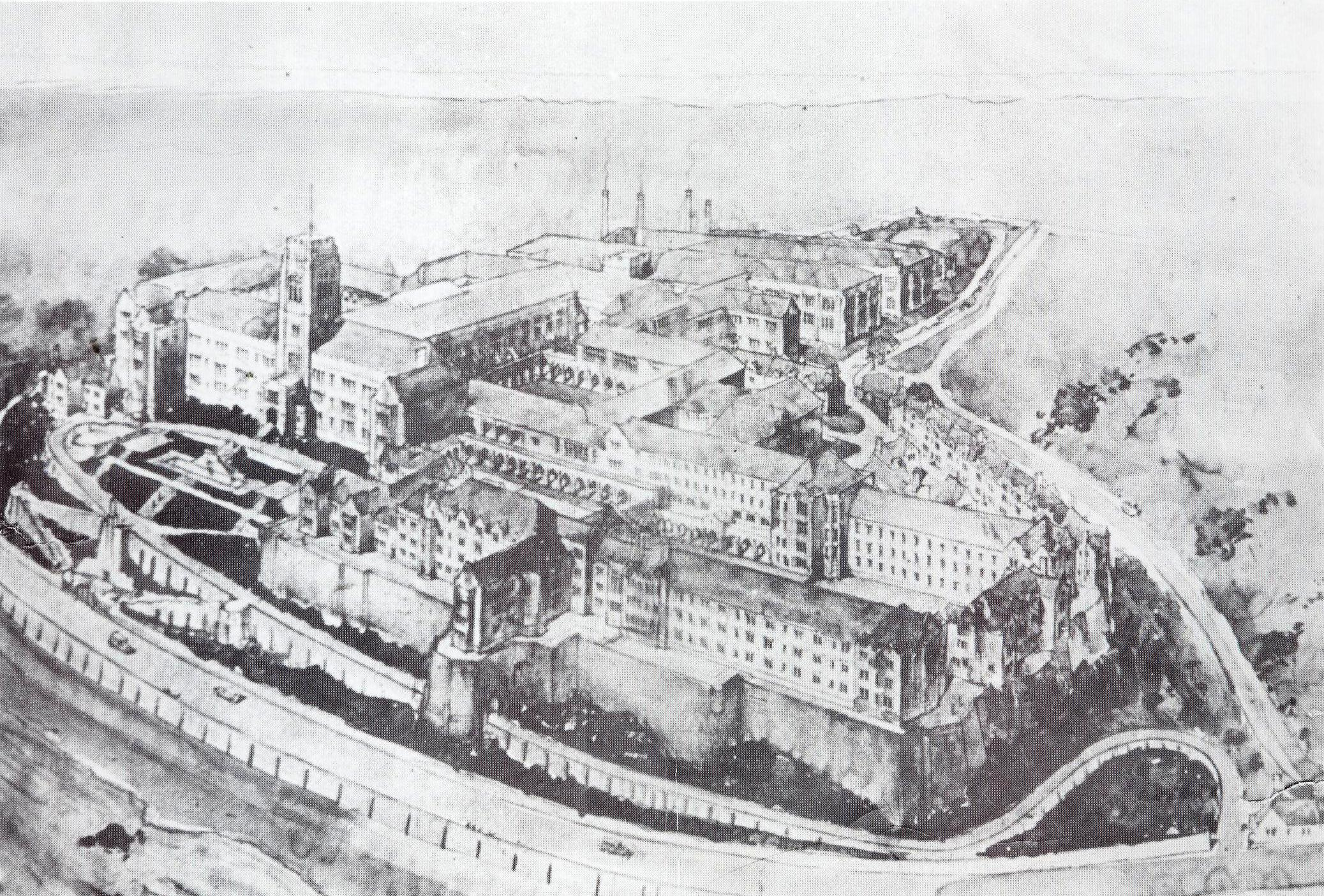
Original UTFSM design (1935)

The university offers undergraduate and graduate degrees. The undergraduate degrees can be of 12 academic semesters (civil engineering), 10 semesters (engineering, pure sciences and architecture), 8 semesters (Applied Engineering) and 6 semesters (technical careers). The graduate degrees offered by this university are Masters (MSc.) and Doctorate (PhD). The Masters of Science degree requires 2 years of study, and the Doctorate degree requires 3 to 5 years of study. All graduate degrees require entrants to have a bachelor's degree.

=== Engineering degrees ===
The engineering degrees at UTFSM (and throughout Chile) are offered in different degrees of difficulty.

- To differentiate it from the engineering studies of 10 semesters, the engineering degree has the suffix of Civil. For example, the degree for 12 academic semesters in chemical engineering has the title of Ingeniero Civil Químico, while the degree of 10 semesters has the title of Ingeniero Químico.The following Bachelor Engineering degrees are granted by this university:
  - Engineering
  - Civil
  - Environmental
  - Electrical
  - Electronics
  - Computer Science
  - Industrial
  - Mathematics
  - Mechanical
  - Metallurgical
  - Chemical
  - Telematics
  - Mining
  - Business management
  - Product design engineering
  - Aircraft business engineering
  - Manufacturing and industrial drawing engineering
  - Occupational Health and Safety Engineering
  - Mechanical processes and maintenance engineering (4 years)
- The following Masters of Science are granted by this university:
  - Civil Engineering
  - Electrical Engineering
  - Electronics
  - Computer Engineering
  - Mechanical
  - Chemical Engineering
  - Industrial Engineering
  - Telematics Engineering
  - Metallurgical Engineering
  - Physics
  - Chemistry
  - Mathematics
- The following PhD Degrees are granted by this university:
  - Biotechnology (Joint degree with the Pontifical Catholic University of Valparaíso)
  - Physics (Joint degree with the Pontifical Catholic University of Valparaíso)
  - Chemistry (2)
  - Electronics Engineering
  - Chemical Engineering
  - Computer Science Engineering
  - Mathematics (Joint degree with the Pontifical Catholic University of Valparaíso and the University of Valparaíso)
  - Mechanical Engineering

=== Chemical Engineering ===
The Chemical Engineering School at UTFSM was founded together with the foundation of the School of Engineers in 1935, being one of the oldest degrees offered by the university. The first Chilean and Latin American doctorate degree in chemical engineering was given to Walter Gaete Castro in 1962, with a cooperation between UTFSM and University of Pittsburgh, US. Nowadays, the chemical engineering department has the name of Department of Chemical and Environmental Engineering (IQA, in Spanish), where Chemical Engineering and Environmental Engineering degrees are offered. The research topics at IQA are:

- Design of industrial processes
- Environmental Engineering
- Food Science and Bioprocesses
- Minerals Processing
- Automation and process control

The Department of Chemical and Environmental Engineering has 12 associate professors, 11 with PhD degrees (92%). The department offers the graduate programs of Master of Science and PhD in chemical engineering.

=== Mechanical Engineering ===
The Mechanical Engineering School at UTFSM was founded together with the foundation of the School of Engineers in 1935, being one of the oldest degrees offered by the university. Its first four mechanical engineers graduated in 1939. The mechanical engineering department was also among the first to offer a PhD program in 1964 (along with Chemical and Electrical Engineering Departments).

The mechanical engineering department has the following research areas:

- Thermodynamics
- Energy and Renewable energies
- Process engineering

The department has 20 full-time professors (2016 data), 17 with PhD degrees (85%). Additional to the Bachelor of Sciences in mechanical engineering (BSc.), the department offers the graduate programs of Master of Science (BSc.) and Doctor of Philosophy (PhD) in mechanical engineering. The department has also made substantive efforts to connect with its alumni. A comprehensive list of the graduates of the department can be found online.

=== Graduate school ===
The UTFSM graduate school started its activities on the 1 August 1960, as a response to the increasing requirements for deeper and applied research in the country. The project was directed by Leroy Stutzman of the University of Pittsburgh, and doctors G.R. Fitterer and John F. Calver, who audited study programs and teaching methods for the project. The first director of the UTFSM graduate school was Herbert Appel, during the period 1960–1964. The school initially offered PhD study lines in chemical, electrical and mechanical engineering. The first UTFSM PhD graduate was Walter Gaete Castro, with a PhD degree in chemical engineering, becoming the first PhD graduate in Latin America.

=== Doctor Honoris Causa ===
The "Doctor Honoris Causa" honorary degree is the highest distinction that UTFSM can bestow. Only seven people had been awarded this honor by UTFSM until 2022, when the university conferred the degree to alumna Lorena A. Barba. Previously, it was awarded to:

- Georges Mikenberg in 2019, physicist, for his work in particle physics and support of the UTFSM participation in CERN research programs.
- Raul Zurita in 2015, and first UTFSM alumnus to obtain it, for his successful career in literature
- Wolfgang Riesenkönig in 2014, for his achievements advancements in computer science in Chile
- Michelle Bachelet in 2007, president of Chile at the time
- Frederik Hayek in 1977, Austrian economist
- Francisco Cereceda in 1964, for his contribution to society and to the university as its former Rector
- (Missing Honoris causa recipient)

== Research ==
Since 2010 UTFSM has been awarded with nearly US$8 million for 76 research projects. Many of these projects involve national and international collaborations with prestigious institutions in Latin America (ANDES Laboratory Project, RIABIN Biotechnology Network), Europe (CERN, Max Planck Institut, Politecnico di Milano), and USA (MIT, SLAC), among others.

== Cultural activities ==
=== University radio ===
The Federico Santa Maria University radio was created on the 7 April 1937, and it is the oldest university radio in Latin America. It can be heard on 1450 kHz in the AM spectrum, on 99.7 MHz in the FM spectrum, and online.

=== University Chamber Choir ===
The Chamber Choir of the Federico Santa María Technical University was founded on August 4, 1951, in its Valparaiso Campus. It is the second oldest choir in Chile with continuous activity. During the choir's over 60 years of existence, it has interpreted an extensive repertoire, including all manifestations of choral western music, from the Middle Ages to the present day. The choir's first performance was at the closing ceremony of the academic year in December 1951, in the Aula Magna, main hall of events in the "A" building of the university's Main Valparaíso campus.

Demosthenes Penna, engineering student of this campus, was its founder and first director until 1954. From March 1955, the choir was directed by Silvio Olate Valenzuela for over 28 years until March 1983. From 1983 to 1987, it was directed by Mauricio Pergelier Hernandez. For the next 23 years, from 1987 to 2010, the choir was conducted by Eduardo Silva Cerda. From 2010, the choir has been conducted by Felipe Molina Lavandera.

The Guayaquil campus in Ecuador also has formed a Choir in 2015, directed by Charles Sampertegui.

=== Folklore ensemble "Alimapu" ===
The university has a long history of musical expression, in particular through its folkloric ensemble "Alimapu"

== Alumni ==
Different organizations, denominated AEXA (from the Spanish "Asociacion de EX Alumnos") have been created at several of the UTFSM campuses:

- AEXA Valparaiso, established in 1939
- AEXA Santiago, established in 1941
- AEXA in the United States, established in 1995

These organization are created and managed by the alumni themselves, and coordinate their action with the university through the UTFSM Alumni Network office.

=== Notable alumni (by year of graduation) ===
- Homero Capona, first engineer graduated at the university, UTFSM electrical engineer (1939).
- Abelardo Quinteros, composer particularly known for his contributions to twelve-note composition and serialism. UTFSM industrial design graduate (1941).
- Carlos Ceruti Gardeazabal, the first Chilean to receive the degree of Doctor Honoris Causa by an international institution: University of Pittsburgh, US. Founder council member of the Chilean school of engineers (1958), UTFSM rector (1958-1968). UTFSM mechanical engineer (1941).
- Mario Luxoro Mariani, First Chilean to earn a PhD degree abroad. National Sciences prize in the year 2000. UTFSM chemical engineer (1948). He later went on to receive a Rockefeller Foundation Scholarship and to earn a PhD at the Massachusetts Institute of Technology (MIT) in 1957. Subsequently, he became a professor at the Faculty of Medicine and dean of the Faculty of Science at the University of Chile in Santiago, Chile.
- Boris Rotman, First UTFSM alumnus to become professor in an Ivy League University (Brown University). He is recognized for performing the first single molecule experiment in biology, and received the State of Rhode Island Governor's award for Scientific Excellence. UTFSM chemical engineer (1948)
- Max von Brand Kuhlmann, vice president of the Chilean nuclear energy commission (1973-1981). UTFSM professor (1957-1984). UTFSM chemical engineer (1956).
- Sergio Contreras Navia, Bishop of Temuco (1978-2001) Directed the construction of the new Temuco Cathedral. UTFSM mechanical engineer (1957). He assisted to graduation dressed in cassock.
- Miguel Kiwi, National Sciences Prize (2007). UTFSM mechanical engineer (1963) and later PhD in physics from the University of Virginia (1967).
- Eugenio Villaseca, first child of a UTFSM graduate, to also graduate from this university. UTFSM electrical engineer (1963) and later PhD in electrical engineering from Arizona State University (1980).
- Patricia Guzman, first woman to graduate from this university. UTFSM chemical technician (1964)
- Graciela Muñoz, first woman to graduate as an engineer at this university. UTFSM chemical engineer (1965)
- Raul Zurita, civil engineer, poet, National Literature Prize (2000). UTFSM civil engineer (1967). He completed the study curriculum but did deliver a thesis or graduate.
- Ivan Schmidt Andrade, physicist. He developed, in cooperation with Dr. Stanley Brodsky from Stanford University, the basic theoretical aspects to create anti-hydrogen atoms in the Laboratory. Based in this methods, Swiss scientists have created the first antimatter atom in the world. He is also member of the Chilean academy of sciences (2010). UTFSM electronics engineer (1968) and later PhD from Stanford University (1977).
- Armin Kunstmann, founder and CEO of "Kunstmann" a well-known Chilean beer brand originally produced in Valdivia, Chile since 1997. UTFSM chemical engineer (1977).
- Mario Pérez, astrophysicist. He studied electronic engineering between 1971 and 1976, after working at the European Southern Observatory, ESO in La Serena and Munich he moved to Amsterdam to study astronomy at the University of Amsterdam, after that he moved to the US to continue his doctorate in astrophysics at the Brigham Young University in Provo, Utah, in 1988, his first port doctorate work was as a resident in the NASA Goddard Space Flight Center (GSFC) in Greenbelt, Maryland, he also worked at Los Alamos National Laboratory (LANL) in Los Alamos, New Mexico. He is now the Program Scientist for the Cosmic Origins Program, the Kepler/K2 mission and the Strategic Astrophysics Technology (SAT) Program within the Astrophysics Division at NASA Headquarters, Science Mission Directorate. He is also the Program Executive for several Exoplanet Programs such as the Large Binocular Telescope Interferometer (LBTI), W.M. Keck Observatory, NASA Exoplanet Science Institute (NExScI) and the NASA-NSF Exoplanet Observational Research (NN-EXPLORE) partnership.
- José Rodríguez Pérez, National Applied Sciences and Technology Prize 2014. UTFSM rector (2006–2014). UTFSM electrical engineer (1977) and later PhD at the University of Erlangen-Nuremberg (1985).
- Ricardo Meruane, Comedian, UTFSM Tooling Technician (1981).
- Charles Menevau, Member of the Chilean academy of sciences (2006). UTFSM mechanical engineer (1985), and later PhD from Yale University (1989). Professor at the Center for environmental and applied fluid mechanics at the Johns Hopkins University.
- Valentina Muñoz Rabanal, programmer and activist (current)

=== Notable faculty ===
- Robert Frucht, German-Chilean mathematician, known for developing the Frucht's theorem, emeritus professor 1970. PhD from the University of Berlin, was a UTFSM professor (1948-1968).
- Robert Breusch, mathematician. Breusch was known for his new proof of the prime number theorem and for the many solutions he provided to problems posed in the American Mathematical Monthly. PhD from the University of Berlin, was a UTFSM professor until 1939.
- Herbert Appel, National Sciences Prize 1971. PhD from Leipzig University, held different roles at the UTFSM chemical engineering department and graduate school (1937 -1981).
- Agustín Edwards Mac-Clure, Executor of the will of Federico Santa María. President of the General Assembly of the League of Nations, interior minister, minister of foreign affairs, cult and colonization and plenipotentiary to Great Britain among other position
- Francisco Cereceda Cisternas, state minister during both Jorge Alessandri and Carlos Ibañez del Campo governments. UTFSM rector (1936-1958).
- Juan Garbarino, Natural Sciences National Prize (1998). UTFSM professor from 1981. Chemical Engineer PUC (1959) and later PhD from University of Lausanne (1966).

=== Notable Alumni in Politics ===
- Eduardo Esteffan, Governor of Copiapo Province 2012–2014, UTFSM civil engineer
- Jorge Brito Hasbún, president of the Federation of Students of the Federico Santa María Technical University (FEUTFSM) and Chilean Deputy since 2018, UTFSM industrial engineer.
- Gaston frene Saavedra Chandia, Chilean deputy since 2018, UTFSM mechanical maintenance technician
- Liliana Kusanović, Governor of Magallanes and Antarctica Province 2010–2011, UTFSM electronics engineer
- Marino Penna, Chilean Deputy 1969–1973, UTFSM chemical engineer (1952)
- Miodrag Marinović Solo de Zaldívar, Chilean Deputy 2010–2014, UTFSM Commercial engineer
