= Julio Meneghello =

Chilean physician, scientist, academic, and researcher

- Born: Julio Meneghello Rivera; 1911
- Died: 15 August 2009 (aged 98); Santiago, Chile
- Resting place: Parque del Recuerdo, Santiago
- Education: University of Chile
- Occupations: Physician, scientist, academic, researcher
- Known for: Pediatrics
- Awards: Rector Juvenal Hernández Jaque Medal (1995); National Prize for Applied Sciences and Technologies (1996); National Prize for Medicine (2002)

Julio Meneghello Rivera (1911 – 15 August 2009) was a Chilean physician, scientist, academic, and researcher, considered the initiator of social paediatrics in his country.

== Biography ==
Julio Meneghello obtained his professional degree in 1936 at the University of Chile. Between 1941 and 1943 he did postgraduate studies at the American universities Harvard, Johns Hopkins, and Cornell.

In 1950, he assisted in the establishment of the Pediatric Research Laboratory, which gave rise in 1977 to the Institute of Nutrition and Food Technology of the University of Chile.

He is considered the father of modern paediatrics in the country, among other things, because he was the first in the world – around 1955 – to put into practice the systematized use of oral serums to treat acute diarrhoea with great dehydration in malnourished children. In addition, he and his team found the ideal composition of these hydrating serums, which (with certain modifications) would be recommended by entities such as the World Health Organization and UNICEF for the management of these minors.

The importance of this scientific and pedagogical work was recognized by the medical journal The Lancet in 1978, as one of the most important medical advances of the 20th century for developing countries.

In 1995, Meneghello received the Rector Juvenal Hernández Jaque Medal, awarded by the University of Chile to those members of their community who, in the exercise of their professions, have rendered distinguished services.

In 1996, he received Chile's National Prize for Applied Sciences and Technologies for his contribution to eradicating malnutrition and reducing infant mortality in the country.

In 2002 he was awarded his country's National Prize for Medicine.

Julio Meneghello died of pneumonia in Santiago on 15 August 2009, at age 98.

Preceded by René Cortázar Sagarminaga	National Prize for Applied Sciences and Technologies; 1996	Succeeded by Fernando Mönckeberg Barros
Preceded by Creation of the prize	National Prize for Medicine; 2002	Succeeded by Helmut Jaeger
