= Edificio de la Bolsa de Valores de Valparaíso =

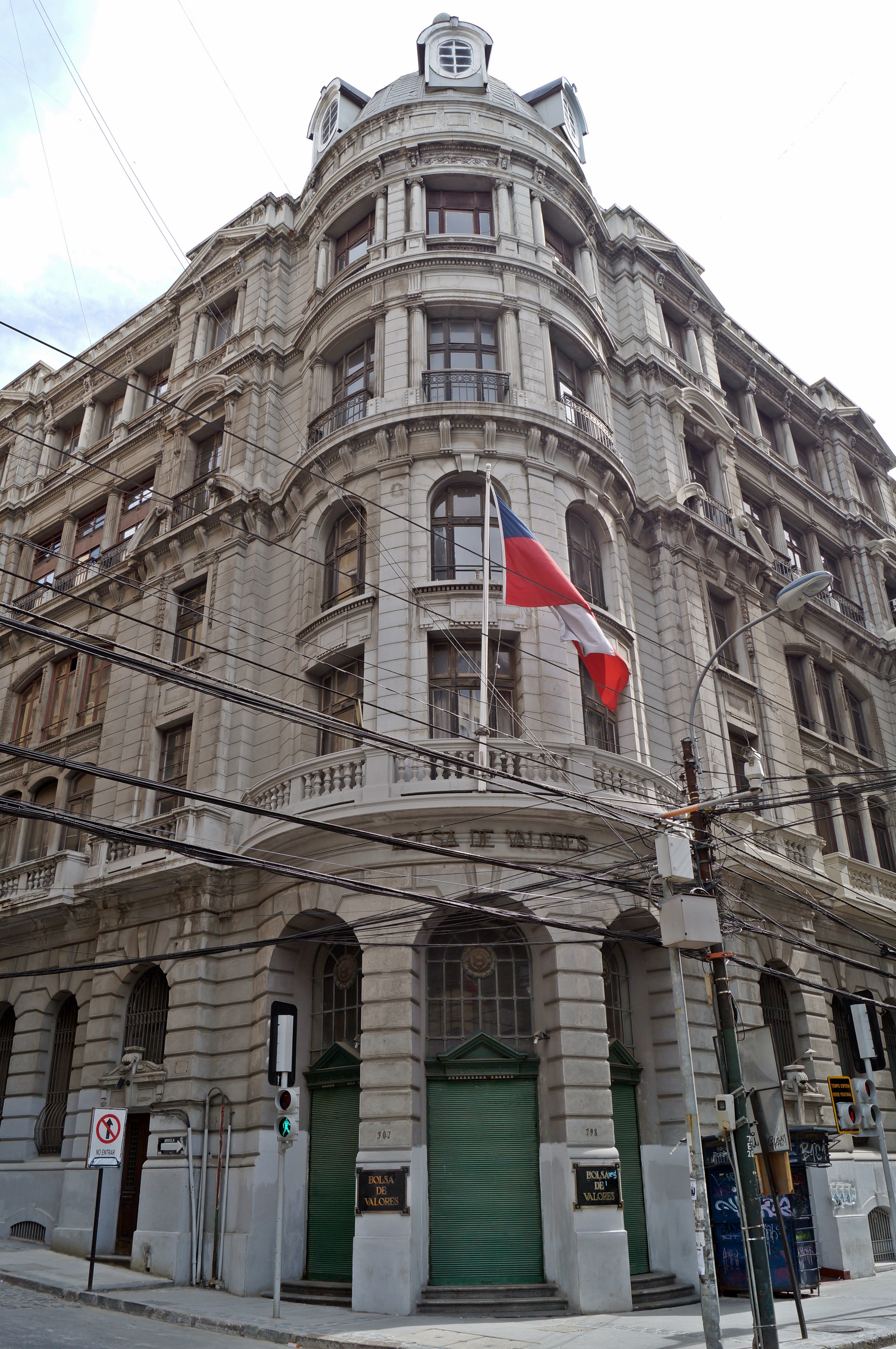
- Interactive map of the Edificio de la Bolsa de Valores de Valparaíso area

General information
- Coordinates: 33°02′25″S 71°37′40″W

The Edificio de la Bolsa de Valores de Valparaíso is a building located at the corner of Prat and Urriola streets, in Valparaíso, Chile. Inaugurated in 1915, it housed the Bolsa de Corredores de Valparaíso until 2018, when the stock exchange closed forever. The building forms part of the Zona Típica de la calle Prat, a heritage area designated as such in 2001.

The building was originally designed by Huber and Laclolet, but the architectural plans were altered by Carlos Claussen. The construction began in 1911, and was inaugurated in 1915. The five-story building features a cylindrical corner, which is topped by a French-style cupola with windows.

In 2019, the Universidad Técnica Federico Santa María purchased the building to be used as a center for innovation, creativity, and entrepreneurship.
