= Pablo DT Valenzuela =

Chilean biochemist

Pablo Valenzuela
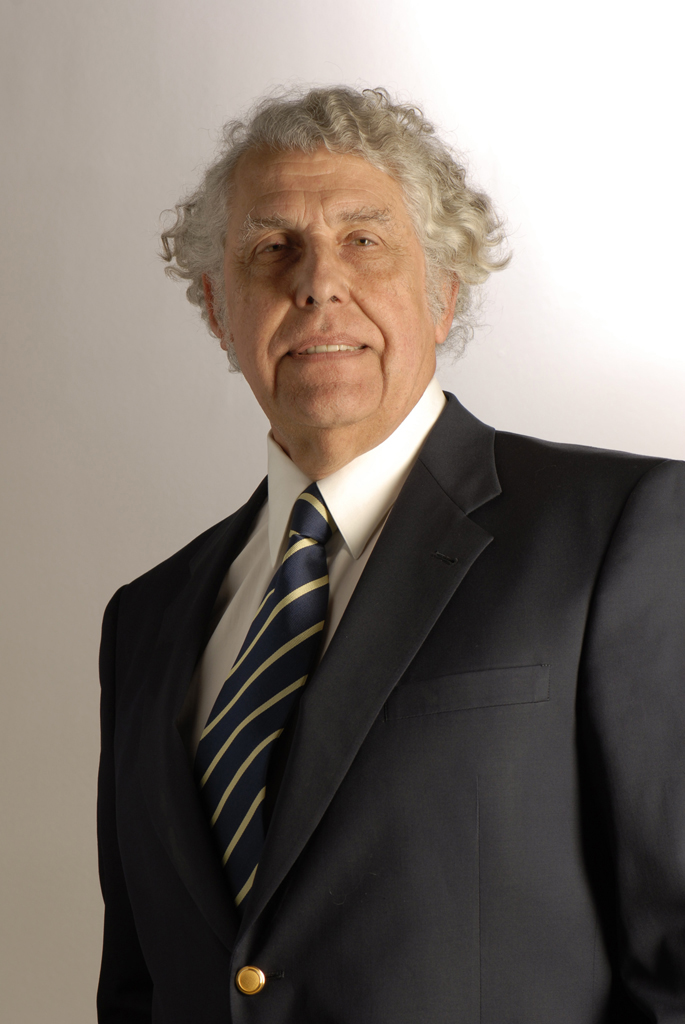
- Born: June 13, 1941 (age 85); Santiago, Chile
- Education: University of Chile, Northwestern University
- Known for: Molecular genetic studies of HBV, HCV, HIV and the invention of the first recombinant vaccine, against HBV. Directed scientists who discovered HCV at Chiron Corporation.
- Awards: Chilean National Prize for Applied Sciences and Technologies (2002)
- Scientific career
- Fields: Biotechnology
- Workplaces: Fundacion Ciencia Para la Vida; Pontifical Catholic University of Chile; Universidad Nacional Andres Bello; Universidad San Sebastian; Chiron Corporation

Pablo Valenzuela (Latin American Spanish: [ˈpaβlo βalenˈswela]; born June 13, 1941) is a Chilean biochemist dedicated to biotechnology development. He is known for his genetic studies of hepatitis viruses; participated as a research and development director in the discovery of hepatitis C virus and the invention of the world's first recombinant vaccine (against hepatitis B virus). He is one of the cofounders of the biotechnology company Chiron Corporation and of Fundacion Ciencia para la Vida, a private non profit institution where he is currently working.

== Biography ==
Pablo Valenzuela studied biochemistry at the Universidad de Chile and earned his Ph.D. degree (1970) in chemistry at Northwestern University. He completed postdoctoral training at the University of California, San Francisco and held a position as professor in the biochemistry department there.

In 1981, with William J. Rutter and Edward Penhoet, he founded the biotechnology company Chiron Corporation, that in 1997 was the second-largest biotechnology company in the world after Amgen. As research director, Valenzuela developed a variety of biotechnological products, specially in the blood banking industry. The invention of the recombinant vaccine against the hepatitis B virus was chosen by Business Week as one of the three most innovative technological products of 1986. In Chile, Valenzuela founded Bios Chile, the first biotechnology company in that country, and in 1997, with Bernardita Mendez, he co-founded Fundacion Ciencia Para la Vida, a nonprofit foundation that carries out scientific and technological research.

He is the father of Chilean-American singer/songwriter Francisca Valenzuela.

== Work ==
Valenzuela has been responsible for the development of biotechnology products in the USA and Chile in the area of international diagnostics, blood banking and pharmaceuticals. He is a cofounder responsible for the early activities of biotechnology start-ups in the USA and Chile. He is also a professor and investigator in graduate programs, generating scientific publications and patents.

Valenzuela was recipient of the Chilean National Prize for Applied Sciences and Technologies in 2002 and is a member of the Chilean Academy of Sciences. He was awarded the UCSF medal in 2014.

=== Science & technology developments in USA ===
- Cofounder of Chiron Corporation.
- Ten products in the field of international diagnostics and blood banking (Hepatitis C, AIDS, Hepatitis B) that have been commercialized by Chiron Corporation, Abbott and Johnson & Johnson.
- Four products in the pharmaceutical field (Hepatitis B vaccine, human insulin, beta-interferon and a wound healing gel based on PDGF) and one product for the food industry (bovine rennin), commercialized worldwide by Chr. Hansen.

=== Science & technology developments in Chile ===
- Co-founder and president of Bios Chile and Austral Biologicals.
- Co-founder and director of Fundación Ciencia para la Vida.
- Co-founder and president of Andes Biotechnologies (start-up 2009).
- Biotechnology products, like vaccines for the salmon aquiculture, licensed to Novartis.
- Products for human health and blood banking (Chagas, H. pylori, rotavirus, blood tests).
- Director of the Millennium Institute for Fundamental and Applied Biology, one of 15 centers of excellence in Chile.
