= Juan Asenjo =

Chilean engineer

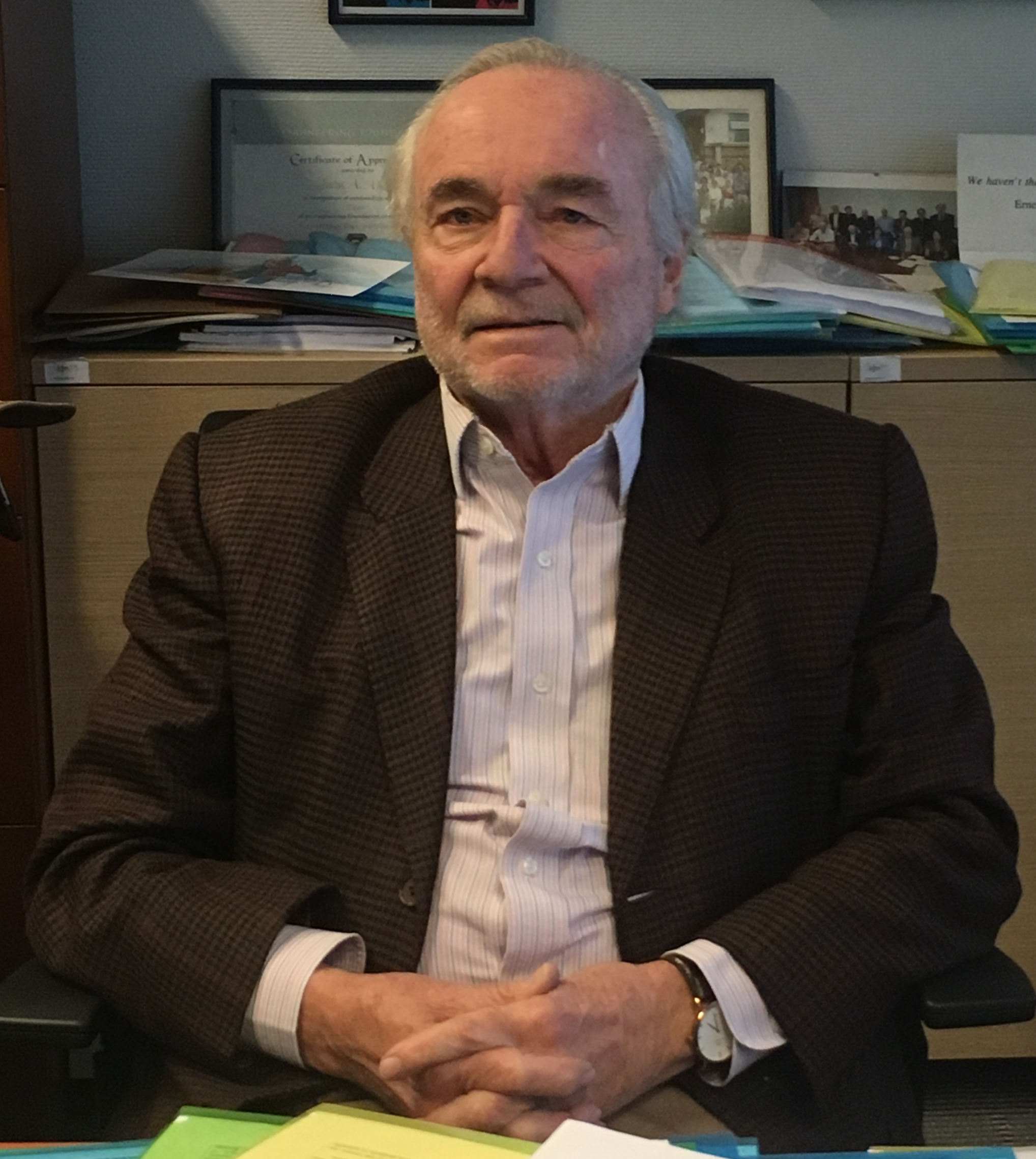
Juan A. Asenjo de Leuze de Lancizolle

Professor Juan A. Asenjo (born October 7, 1949) is a Chilean chemical engineer who specialises in biotechnology. He currently serves as the director of the Centre for Biochemical Engineering and Biotechnology at the University of Chile and is the President of the Chilean Academy of Science.

== Education and career ==
Asenjo studied for his first degree in chemical engineering at the University of Chile, graduating in 1974. He then moved to the University of Leeds, UK to complete an MSc, followed by a PhD at University College London supervised by Peter Dunnill and M. D. Lilly. He moved back to Chile for one year before being appointed Assistant Professor in biochemical engineering at Columbia University, New York where he remained until 1986. In 1987 he moved to the University of Reading to become a Reader in biochemical engineering and the director of the biochemical engineering laboratory. Then in 1995 he returned to Chile and established the Centre for Biochemical Engineering and Biotechnology at the University of Chile which he continues to direct.

== Research ==
Asenjo has made scientific contributions where the fields of mathematics and computer science merge with biology and biotechnology. This has included developing models of enzyme systems for the lysis of microbial cells and for predicting the behaviour of proteins in aqueous two-phase systems. He has been involved in the purification of several proteins including alpha amylase, tissue plasminogen activator, monoclonal antibodies and virus-like particles. Recently his group have begun working in the fields of protein engineering, metabolic engineering and functional genomics. One specific area of research is an attempt to produce detergents which work at low temperatures based on trypsin enzymes originally isolated from Antarctic krill. The Santiago Times reported in 2013 that Asenjo's group was to begin testing a vaccine for alcoholism on mice and hoped to begin pre-clinical trials in humans later that year. In November 2013 the vaccine was in stage 2 clinical trials. The vaccine acts to inhibit acetaldehyde dehydrogenase causing people to experience a hangover shortly after consuming alcohol.

He has called for Chile to invest more in scientific research and development, which would allow the country to add value to its exports, for example by exporting lithium batteries rather than raw lithium.

== Recognition ==
He was elected as a member of the Chilean Academy of Science in 1999 and was appointed as its Vice President in 2004 and President in 2010. In 2004 he was awarded the Chilean National Prize for Applied Sciences and Technologies, with the jury noting his research was of a high impact and quality, as demonstrated by over 100 publications, several patents and having supervised over 40 doctoral students.

In 2018, Asenjo was elected a member of the National Academy of Engineering for contributions to protein separations for the biotechnology industry and to biotechnology research, development, and entrepreneurship in Chile.
