= Liliana Kusanović =

Chilean politician and businesswoman

Liliana Kusanović Marusić
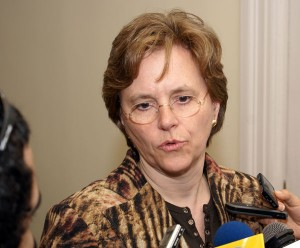
- Liliana Kusanović in 2011

Intendant of the Magallanes Region and the Chilean Antarctic
- In office 11 March 2010 – 11 April 2011
- Preceded by: Mario Maturana
- Succeeded by: Arturo Storaker

Personal details
- Born: 26 March 1955 (age 71) Magallanes Region, Chile
- Party: Independent
- Education: Federico Santa María Technical University; University of Texas–Pan American
- Occupation: Businesswoman, politician
- Profession: Civil engineer

Liliana Kusanović Marusić (born March 26, 1955) is a Chilean businesswoman and politician of Croatian descent who served as Intendant of the Magallanes and Chilean Antarctic Region from March 2010 to April 2011.

== Career ==
Kusanovic graduated as a civil engineer from the Federico Santa María Technical University and later obtained a Master of Business Administration (MBA) from the University of Texas–Pan American. From 1988 to 1991, she served as director of the International Department of the Center for Economic Development at the University of Texas. During the 1990s and 2000s, she founded and participated in several companies in the Magallanes Region, most of them related to the tourism industry.

In March 2010, Kusanovic was appointed Intendant of the Magallanes and Chilean Antarctic Region by President Sebastián Piñera. In December of that year, she visited the Chilean Antarctic Territory to evaluate public policies related to scientific and tourism development in Antarctica.

During the regional protests in January 2011, she supported the government's decision to increase natural gas prices by 16.8 percent, which led to strong opposition to her administration in the region.

On April 11, 2011, Kusanovic announced her resignation from office, which she had submitted to the government in January. The resignation was immediately accepted by the central government. Kusanovic stated that Piñera had asked her to remain in office until her successor was appointed. She was succeeded by Arturo Storaker, who assumed office on April 25, 2011.

Prior to her resignation, Kusanovic was in charge of managing and coordinating a working group in the region between parliamentarians and mayors of the area along with President Piñera, who visited Antarctica with his Ecuadorian counterpart, Rafael Correa, in February 2011.
