= Abelardo Quinteros =

Abelardo Quinteros (born 10 December 1923, Valparaíso) is a Chilean composer who is particularly known for his contributions to twelve-note composition and serialism. His most well known works include his award-winning Horizon carré, Cantos al espejo, Sinfonema, 3 arabescos concertantes, and Piano Studies. His music is known for its lyricism and expressiveness.

From 1936 to 1941 Quinteros studied industrial design at Federico Santa María Technical University. He then studied music composition in Santiago with Pedro H. Allende from 1942 to 1948 and Fré Focke from 1949 to 1951. He won a scholarship from the Austrian Embassy in Chile which enabled him to pursue further studies at the Steinbauer Academy in Vienna, where he studied serialism with Othmar Steinbauer and singing with Christal Kern.
