= National Prize for Medicine =

Award from the Chilean Academy of Medicine

- Awarded for: Medical excellence in the area of clinical or public health
- Sponsored by: Chilean Academy of Medicine; Association of Medical Faculties of Chile; Association of Medical Scientific Societies of Chile; Medical College of Chile
- Date: 27 April
- Country: Chile
- First award: 2002

The National Prize for Medicine (Spanish: Premio Nacional de Medicina) was created in 2001 by the Chilean Academy of Medicine, the Association of Medical Faculties, the Association of Medical Scientific Societies, and the Medical College of Chile.

It is given to recognize the work of those doctors who have excelled among their peers in the area of clinical or public health and, in addition, have had a prominent role in teaching, academic administration, or research.

The prize consists of a diploma, a commemorative medal, and an amount of money that is contributed by the medical community.

It is awarded every two years.

== Winners ==
- 2002: Julio Meneghello, surgeon of the University of Chile, pediatrician
- 2004: Helmut Jaeger, surgeon of the University of Chile, pediatric heart surgeon
- 2006: Alejandro Goic Goic, surgeon of the University of Chile, internist and gastroenterologist
- 2008: Esteban Parrochia, surgeon of the University of Chile, internist
- 2010: Rodolfo Armas Merino, surgeon of the University of Chile, internist and gastroenterologist
- 2012: Fernando Mönckeberg Barros, medical surgeon of the University of Chile
- 2014: Juan Verdaguer Tarradella, surgeon of the University of Chile, ophthalmologist
- 2016: Manuel García de los Ríos Álvarez, surgeon of the University of Concepción, internist and diabetologist
- 2018: Otto Dörr Zegers, psychiatrist of the University of Chile (Note: Presentation of the award was postponed after questions were raised about Dörr's past connections with the Colonia Dignidad secret detention camp. Dörr denied the allegations, stating his involvement was "absolutely marginal". Ethical hearings continued for several months.)

== See also ==
- List of medicine awards
