= William J. Rutter =

American biochemist (1927–2025)

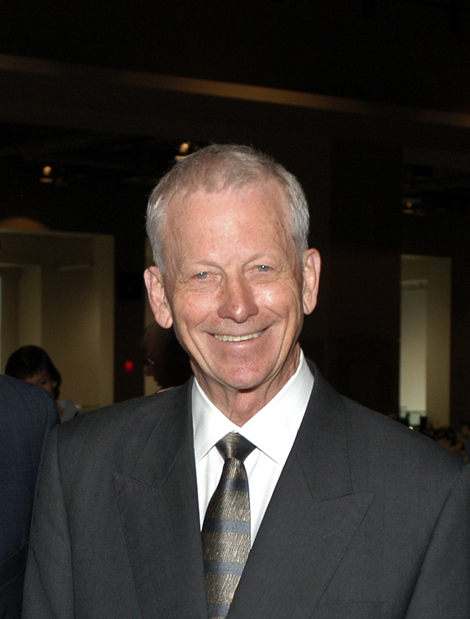
- Rutter in 2003
- Born: August 28, 1927; Malad City, Idaho, U.S.
- Died: July 11, 2025 (aged 97); San Francisco, California, U.S.
- Education: Brigham Young University, Harvard University, University of Utah, University of Illinois
- Awards: Pfizer Award in Enzyme Chemistry (1968)
- Scientific career
- Fields: Biochemistry
- Workplaces: University of California, San Francisco; Chiron Corporation
- Thesis: Some aspects of lactose metabolism (1952)
- Doctoral advisor: R. Gaurth Hansen
- Other academic advisors: Henry A. Lardy (post-doctoral advisor)
- Doctoral students: Edward Penhoet; Robert G. Roeder; Pablo DT Valenzuela
- Other notable students: Post-docs: Charles Craik; Ronald T. Raines

William J. Rutter (August 28, 1927 – July 11, 2025) was an American biochemist who cofounded the early biotechnology company Chiron Corporation together with Edward Penhoet and Pablo DT Valenzuela. As chairman of the department of biochemistry and biophysics of the University of California, San Francisco, Rutter helped establish that department as a leader in the academic side of the biotechnology during the San Francisco Bay Area biotech boom of the 1980s.

Rutter spent a short time in the United States Navy and one year Brigham Young University, before completing a B.A. (1949) in biochemistry at Harvard University. He earned an M.S. (1950) from University of Utah and a Ph.D. (1952) from the University of Illinois with a dissertation on galactosemia. Between 1952 and 1968, Rutter held positions at the University of Wisconsin, Karolinska Institutet, University of Illinois, Stanford University, and University of Washington. In 1969, he moved to the University of California, San Francisco (UCSF), where he led the department of biochemistry and biophysics until 1982. From 1983 until 1989, Rutter was director of the Hormone Research Institute at UCSF which is now the Diabetes Center at UCSF. Research breakthroughs under his leadership include the first cloning of genes for insulin and growth hormone, at UCSF, and a recombinant DNA vaccine for hepatitis B and decoded genomes for HIV and hepatitis C viri, at the Chiron Corp.

In 1996, Rutter won the 2nd Annual Heinz Awards in Technology, the Economy and Employment and in 2003, he received the Biotechnology Heritage Award, from the Biotechnology Industry Organization (BIO) and the Chemical Heritage Foundation. He received honorary degrees from the University of Wisconsin in 2016 and the University of Utah in 2021.

Rutter died of urothelial cancer in San Francisco, California on July 11, 2025, at the age of 97.
