= Otto Dörr Zegers =

Chilean surgeon and psychiatrist

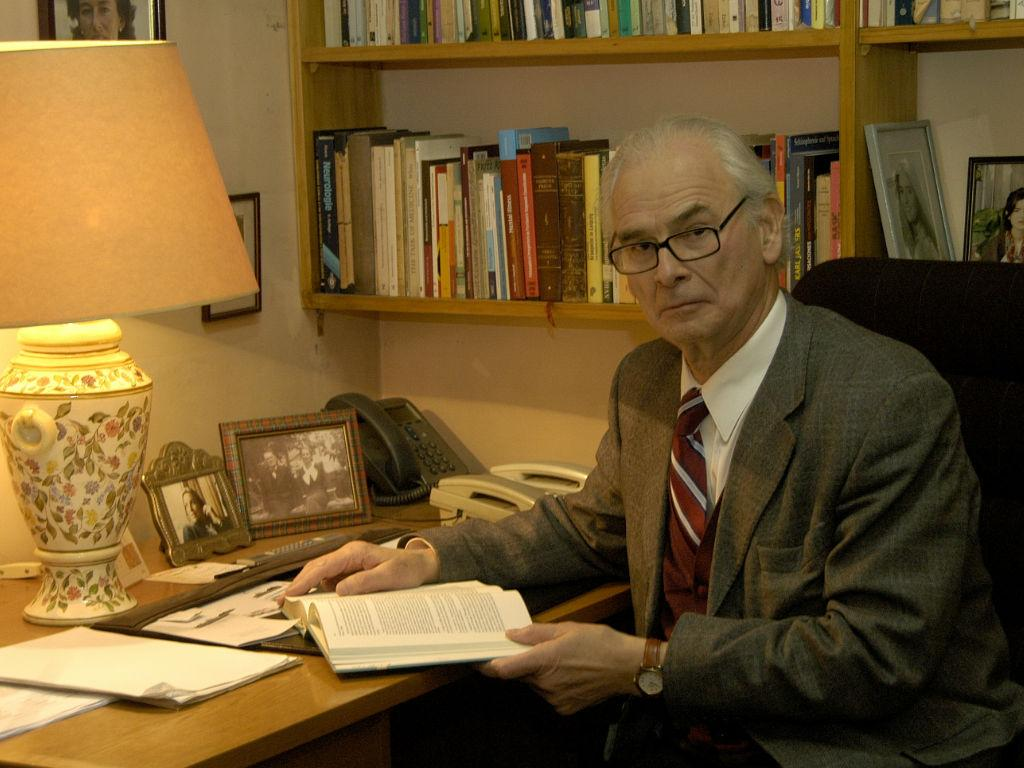
picture of Otto Dörr studying

Otto Dörr Zegers (born December 25, 1936, Curicó, Chile). Medical Surgeon of the University of Chile (1961), Psychiatrist, (Graduate School of the Faculty of Medicine, University of Chile (1968); Doctor of Medicine Heidelberg University (1972); specialist in Psychiatry and Neurology, University of Heidelberg (1980); Specialist in Psychotherapy, University of Heidelberg (1981) Emeritus Professor of Diego Portales University, Master of Chilean Psychiatry and National Prize for Medicine in 2018, the paternity of the disease entity "Bulimia Nervosa" (1994). Dörr previously described it as “Secondary hyperphagia and vomiting syndrome in young women" in the Chilean Journal of Neuropsychiatry in 1972, an article that was published in English in the “International Journal of Eating Disorders".

== Biography ==
He was born in Curicó on December 25, 1936, son of Dr. Otto Dörr Valck and Mrs. Teresa Zegers. In 1942 he entered the San Martín de Curicó Institute, arriving in 1951 at the San Ignacio School in Santiago. In 1954 he entered to study medicine at the University of Chile, ending his degree in 1961 and starting that year a scholarship for Psychiatric training at the University of Chile.

In 1962 he married Carmen Álamos Errázuriz, with whom he began a trip to Spain to train in Psychiatry with Professor Juan José López-Ibor, Professor at the Complutense University of Madrid and President of the World Association of Psychiatry. During this period participates in the course on "History of Medicine", taught by Professor Pedro Laín Entralgo.

In 1963, Otto Dörr worked at Professor Ruffin's Clinic in Freiburg, and then completed his training at the Psychiatric Clinic of the University of Heidelberg.

Between 1963 and 1966, he worked alongside D. Janz, W. Bräutigam, H. Kisker, H. Hippius, and Hubertus Tellenbach, who was his teacher, friend, guide, and mentor. They were all leading figures in the field of neurology, psychiatry, and modern German psychotherapy.

In 1966, Dr. Otto Dörr returned with his family to Chile to work with Professor Prinz von Auersperg at the university and at the Psychiatric Hospital of Concepción. He remained in this city until 1970, the year in which he left for Santiago, accepting a position at the Psychiatric Clinic of the University of Chile (1970-1976).

Between 1978 and 1981, he settled with his family in Heidelberg, at whose University he completed his Doctorate in Psychiatry and his training as a Neuropsychiatrist and Psychotherapist. Under the tutelage of Professor Werner Janzarik, he works as Head of the Clinic and teaches at the Faculties of Medicine and Psychology and with Hubertus Tellenbach collaborates in the international positioning of Phenomenology and the anthropological current of Psychiatry, as well as studies on melancholy and depression.

In 1981 he returned to Chile to occupy a position as Head of Sector 3 at the then Psychiatric Hospital of Santiago, today the José Horwitz Barak Institute, commissioned by Professor Mario Gomberoff. Between 1989 and 1992, he was director of the Department of Psychiatry of the South Campus of the Faculty of Medicine of the University of Chile and head of the Clinical Service of the Psychiatric Hospital of Santiago, between 1992 and 2008.

In 2020 he worked as a professor at the Faculty of Medicine of the University of Chile, working as undergraduate and postgraduate professor. At the same time, he directs the Center for Studies of Phenomenology and Psychiatry at the Diego Portales University.

Otto Dörr Zegers currently belongs to 5 scientific societies in Chile and 12 in the rest of the world. He has been editor and member of the editorial board of more than a dozen scientific journals, among which is “Philosophy, Ethics and Humanities in Medicine” (Austin, Texas and London). He is a Professor of Psychiatry at the Faculty of Medicine of the University of Chile and has taught at the universities of Heilderberg, Leipzig, Paris, Madrid, Barcelona, Bern and São Paulo. He has made 211 presentations at national seminars, congresses and symposia, and nearly 200 international ones. His career includes 71 publications in national scientific journals, 72 in international ones, and a score of awards, scholarships and distinctions both in Chile and abroad.

== Awards and distinctions ==
- " Claudio Orrego Vicuña " Award, awarded by the Chilean Institute of Humanistic Studies, "for his contributions to humanism" (1986).
- Annual Award in the "Science" category from Editorial Los Andes (1988).
- Appointed by the World Psychiatric Association (WPA), as the sole representative of Latin America, in a commission ad hoc of seven members, to investigate the political use of psychiatry in the former Soviet Union (1991)
- International Award granted by the “Dr. Margrit Egnér" and the University of Zürich, Switzerland, for his “ contributions to Anthropological Medicine and Psychology ” (1992)
- International Recognition of the paternity of the nosological entity “Bulimia Nervosa” (1994).
- Award from the Chilean Society of Neurology, Psychiatry and Neurosurgery for "Extraordinary Contributions to the Specialty" (1994).
- Elected Member of the Academy of Medicine of the Institute of Chile (1998).
- Named Master of Chilean Psychiatry by the Society of Neurology, Psychiatry and Neurosurgery (2001).
- Named Corresponding Member of the Royal Academy of Medicine of Catalonia (2002).

=== National Medicine Prize ===
Dörr's greatest contribution worldwide is his creation of the concept of Bulimia nervosa. Dörr described this pathology with the name "Secondary hyperphagia and vomiting syndrome in young women", in an article published in the Chilean Journal of Neuropsychiatry in 1972. However, seven years later the British author; Gerald Russell was regarded as the creator of the concept.

After 15 years, Dörr was recognized as the true "father of bulimia", what remained of his article through a publication in the British magazine " International Journal of Eating Disorders" in which the article was disseminated original by the Chilean psychiatrist that would be translated into English. The National Medicine Award is a recognition that has been awarded since 2001 by the Chilean Academy of Medicine in conjunction with the Association of Medical Societies of Chile, the Association of Faculties of Medicine of Chile and the Medical College of Chile, whose objective is to recognize the trajectory of professionals who have stood out for their contributions to the area of health, along with playing a role in teaching, research and/or academic administration.

Dörr received the 2018 National Prize for Medicine at a ceremony organized by ASOCIMED, the Chilean Academy of Medicine, and the Association of Faculties of Medicine of Chile; the award highlighting him amongst his peers for establishing a description of bulimia as a pathology.

== Colonia Dignidad ==
In August 2019, the Ethics Tribunal of the Medical College of Chile ruled unanimously in favor of a group of Colonia Dignidad victims who filed a complaint against Dörr. The ruling resolved a sanction of reprimand but ruled out that he belonged to or had worked at the secretive colony as a surgeon. There were no changes regarding the recognition awarded to the psychiatrist by the Association of Faculties of Medicine of Chile. The Third Chamber of the Santiago Court of Appeals ratified a dismissal of Otto Dörr's arguments to annul the reprimand given to him by the Ethics Tribunal. The court accused Dörr of conflating the pederasty of Colonia Dignidad founder Paul Schäfer with homosexuality, and of delaying the presence of a victim in court.

== Bibliography ==
- Anthropological Psychiatry: Contributions to a Phenomenological-Anthropological Orientation Psychiatry, 1995. ISBN 9789561125568 9561125560, 9789561125568
- Living Space and Time, 1996.
- The word and the music: essays inspired by the poetry of Rainer Maria Rilke, translated from German as: Das Wort und die Musik: zwölf Essays inspiriert durch die Poesie von Rainer Maria Rilke, 2011
- The Elegies of the Duino by Rainer Maria Reiker, translated from the German as: Die Elegien des Duino von Rainer Maria Reiker
