= Edward Penhoet =

American biotechnology founder and businessman

Edward E. Penhoet
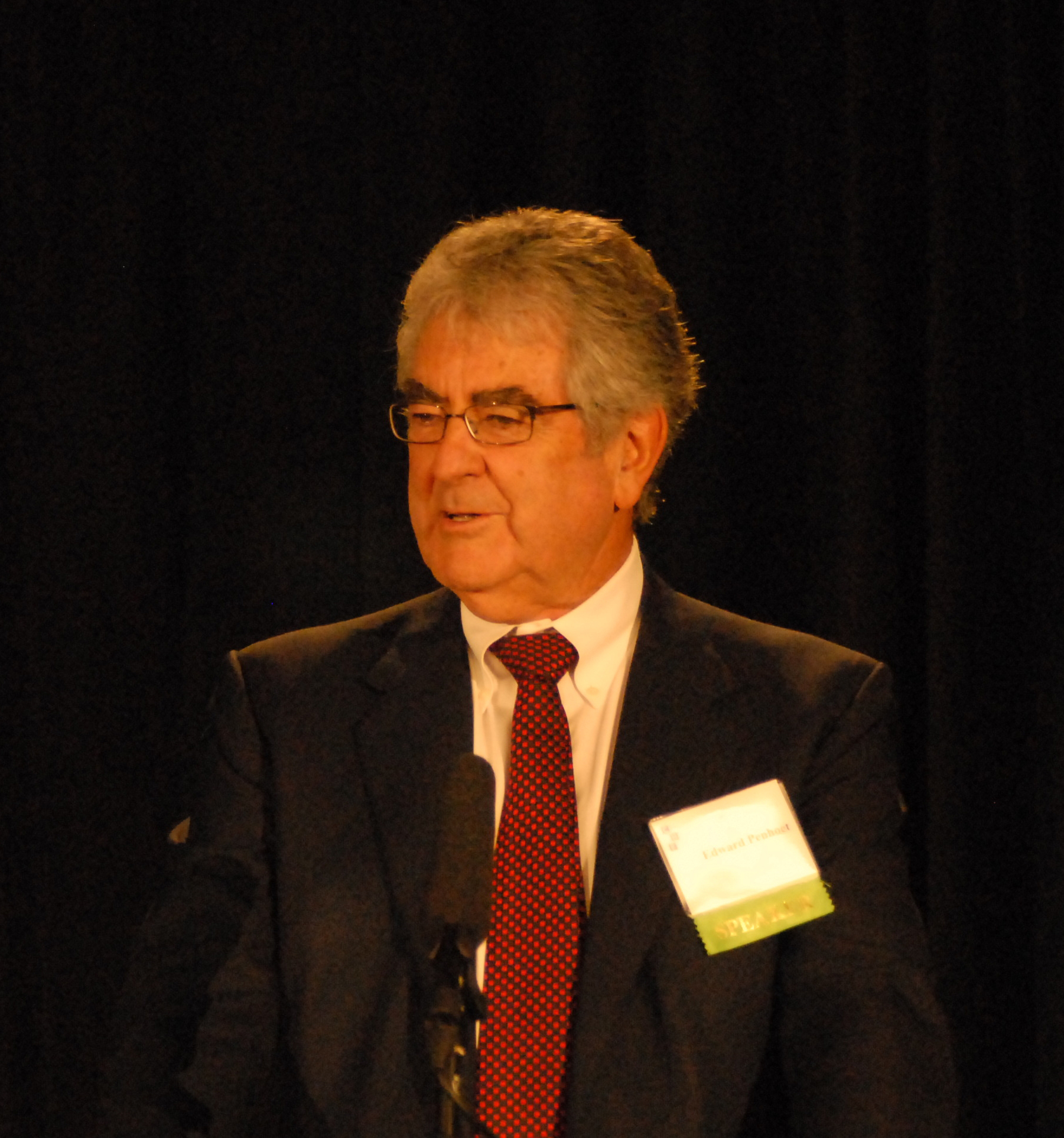
- Penhoet photographed while giving opening remarks at "The Evolution of HIV/AIDS Therapies"
- Born: December 11, 1940 (age 85); Oakland, California, United States
- Education: Stanford University, University of Washington
- Occupations: Scientist, academic, and entrepreneur
- Known for: Co-founding biotechnology firm that advancements in treatments of AIDS, hepatitis, multiple sclerosis, and kidney disease

Edward E. Penhoet (born December 11, 1940, in Oakland, California) is an American scientist, academic and entrepreneur who co-founded Chiron, an American multinational biotechnology firm based in Emeryville, California. Chiron is known for its advancements in treatments of AIDS, hepatitis, multiple sclerosis, and kidney disease. He is the Associate Dean of the Division of Biological Sciences at the University of California, Berkeley.

He was a member of the President's Council of Advisors on Science and Technology (PCAST) from 2009 until 2017. The council makes science, technology, and innovation policy recommendations to the President of the United States.

== Early life and education ==
In 1963, Penhoet completed his Bachelor of Arts in biology at Stanford University, and then earned his Ph.D. in biochemistry at the University of Washington in 1968. From 1968 to 1970, he was a postdoctoral fellow at the University of California, San Diego.

== Career ==
After completing his postdoctoral fellowship in 1970, Penhoet served six years as an assistant professor at the University of California, Berkeley. He then assumed the role of associate professor in Berkeley’s Department of Biochemistry until 1983. Penhoet resigned from his position as tenured faculty to concentrate on Chiron, a company he co-founded in 1981, and served as president and chief executive officer until 1998. At various times during his tenure, he oversaw virtually all of Chiron’s company's activities, including research, finance, administration, human resources, manufacturing, and regulatory matters. Penhoet was on the board of directors at many biotech companies, including Zymogenetics, Chimerix, Scynexis, and Immune Design. From 1998 to 2002, Penhoet was dean of the UC Berkeley School of Public Health. From 2002 until 2004, he was the chief scientific officer of the Gordon and Betty Moore Foundation, where he was also President from 2004 until 2008.

Penhoet has also held roles as vice chair of the Independent Citizens oversight committee at the California Institute for Regenerative Medicine from 2004 until 2008 and director of Alta Partners from 2000 until 2016. He previously served as the chairman of Immune Design, Inc.

Penhoet has served on the board of directors of many local, state, and national organizations, including as chairman of the California Health Care Institute and the Chabot Space & Science Center boards and as a member of the San Francisco Bay Area Bioscience Center and Kaiser Permanente boards. He was elected to the Institute of Medicine of the National Academy of Sciences and was a member of the Science, Technology, and Economic Policy Board of the National Research Council, American Society of Biological Chemists, National Research Council Commission on Life Sciences, National Institutes of Health Economic Roundtable on Biomedical Research, and the American Association for the Advancement of Science. In 2009, he was an elected member of the American Academy of Arts and Sciences, the National Academy of Medicine, and the American Society for Biochemistry and Molecular Biology. Also, in 2009, he was elected a member of the President's Council of Advisors on Science and Technology (PCAST), a role he held until 2017.

== Recognition ==
Penhoet received the first Distinguished Faculty Award in 1991 from the Department of Molecular and Cell Biology at University of California, Berkeley

With Chiron co-founder, William J. Rutter, Penhoet shared the North Californian Entrepreneur of the Year Award in 1992, presented by the Ernst & Young and Inc. Magazine. They also received the Harvard Business School Northern California Alumni Chapter Award for Entrepreneur of the Year in 1994.

Penhoet received the 2017 Fiat Lux Faculty Award from UC Berkeley, an achievement award for faculty members whose extraordinary contributions go above and beyond the university’s philanthropic mission and transform its research, teaching, and programs.

Penhoet has also written over 50 scientific publications. The Marquis Who's Who has also listed him as a noteworthy dean, company executive, and foundation administrator.
