= National Prize for Applied Sciences and Technologies (Chile) =

National Prize for Applied and Technological Sciences
- For the scientist whose work in the respective field of knowledge makes him worthy of said distinction
- Sponsored by: CONICYT
- Country: Chile
- First award: 1992

The National Prize for Applied and Technological Sciences (Spanish: Premio Nacional de Ciencias Aplicadas y Tecnológicas) was created in 1992 as one of the replacements for the National Prize for Sciences under Law 19169. The other two prizes in this same area are for Exact Sciences and Natural Sciences.

It is part of the National Prize of Chile.

== Jury ==
The jury is made up of the Minister of Education, who calls it, two academics assigned by the Council of Rectors, the President of the National Commission for Scientific and Technological Research (CONICYT), and the last recipient of the prize.

== Prize ==
The prize consists of:

- A diploma
- A cash prize amounting to 6,562,457 pesos (US$8,647) which is adjusted every year, according to the previous year's consumer price index
- A pension of 20 monthly tax units (approximately US$1,600) in January of the corresponding year, which remains constant for the rest of the year

== Winners ==
- 1992, Raúl Sáez
- 1994: René Cortázar Sagarminaga
- 1996: Julio Meneghello
- 1998: Fernando Mönckeberg Barros
- 2000: Andrés Weintraub Pohorille
- 2002: Pablo Valenzuela
- 2004: Juan Asenjo
- 2006: Edgar Kausel
- 2008: José Miguel Aguilera
- 2010: Juan Carlos Castilla
- 2012: Ricardo Uauy
- 2014: José Rodríguez Pérez
- 2016: Horacio Croxatto
- 2018: Romilio Espejo Torres

== See also ==
- CONICYT
- List of agriculture awards
- List of engineering awards
