= Clover 2030 Engineering =

The Clover 2030 Engineering
- An engine to surf the waves of Chile's development
- Project type: University Development Strategy
- Funding agency: Corporación de Fomento de la Producción (CORFO)
- Reference: Drive Chilean universities towards world-class engineering education
- Participants: PUC (Chile), UTFSM (Chile)
- Partners: UC Berkeley (US), MIT (US), Texas A&M (US), Columbia University (US), Católica-Lisbon (Portugal), University of Notre Dame (US), Edinburgh (UK)
- Duration: 2013 –
- Website: https://www.ingenieria2030.org/

The Clover 2030 Engineering Strategy, also known as project Ingeniería 2030, is a joint initiative between two Chilean universities, the Pontifical Catholic University of Chile and the Federico Santa María Technical University This joint project was started in 2013, in order to transform engineering education by developing a new, shorter curricular design, funding relevant research, and by establishing a student-centered education that emphasizes multidisciplinarity, user-centered design and social responsibility as well as student flexibility and choice. This initiative thus expects to provide a platform to work on societal grand challenges, to orchestrate effective I+E networks, and to build a world-class engineering community.

This consortium expects to transform these universities into world-class institutions, positioning them as the best engineering schools in Latinamerica by 2020 and among the best 50 engineering schools in the world by 2030.

== Background ==
In 2013, the Chilean National Agency for Innovation and Development (CORFO) launched the "New Engineering 2030" initiative, as a bid to transform the economy. In sync with international trends in engineering education, CORFO decided to motivate the renewal of engineering training so as to be more prepared to address significant challenges of the society. The New Engineering 2030 set out to co-finance strategic plans that would serve as a 6-year roadmap to create engineering education that meets global requirements by means of applied research, technology transfer, innovation and technology-based entrepreneurship. By motivating universities to prepare more engineers towards international competitiveness and productivity, CORFO intended to propel Chile from a developing to a developed knowledge-based economy.

In 2014, the joint proposal by School of Engineering at the Universidad Catóica, in alliance with the Universidad Técnica Federico Santa María, obtained the highest ranking in this national competition of 8 projects presented by different university consortia in the country.

== Characteristics ==
Some of the characteristics of this initiative are:

Characteristics
Characteristic	Description
Motivation	Create a world-class consortium in engineering education in Chile
Guiding principles	Transform engineering education, Face societal grand challenges, Orchestrate effective I+E networks, Build a world-class community, New liaison with society
Organizational structure	Superior institutional board, International advisory board, UC Dean (2030 Director), UTFSM Vice-president of academic affairs (2030 Associate Director); Faculty and staff (team leaders and managers)
Strategic partners	Ruth Graham (consultant), UC Berkeley (US), MIT (US), Texas A&M (US), Columbia University (US), Católica-Lisbon (PT), University of Notre Dame (US), Edinburgh (UK)
Milestones	Creation of an engineering education division, Creation of a minimum course in R+I+E, Pilot course for UC and UTFSM students, New academic evaluation criteria, Brain Chile contest in I+E, UC Berkeley satellite campus
Long-term metrics of success	Improvements in world and regional rankings: to be top in the Latin American region in 2020, and top 50 worldwide in 2030
Challenges	Diversify the international network, Develop closer link with the entrepreneurial, ecosystem and the local industry, Sustain the consortium consensus over priorities
