= José Rodríguez Pérez =

Chilean engineer and professor of electrical engineering

- Born: Valdivia, Chile
- Education: Federico Santa María Technical University; University of Erlangen-Nuremberg
- Awards: National Prize for Applied Sciences and Technologies
- Scientific career
- Fields: Electronics; Mathematics; Computer science
- Workplaces: Federico Santa María Technical University; Andrés Bello National University

José Rodríguez Pérez is a Chilean engineer and professor of electrical engineering at the Universidad Andrés Bello.

== Early life and education ==
Rodríguez was born in Valdivia, Chile. He received the degrees of Technician in Electronics and Electrical Engineer at the Federico Santa María Technical University (USM) in 1977 and his doctorate in electrical engineering at the University of Erlangen-Nuremberg in 1985. Since 1977 he is working at USM where he is currently Professor in the Department of Electronical Engineering.

== Career ==
In 1996, during his sabbatical leave, Rodríguez Pérez was responsible for Mining Division of Siemens division in Santiago, Chile. From 2004 to 2005, he was the Vice Rector for Academic Affairs, and since 2005, he has also been the Rector at the Federico Santa María Technical University. From 2005 to 2008 Dr. Rodríguez's research group was recognized as one of the two Centers of Excellence in Engineering in Chile. Since 2002, José Rodríguez Pérez was an associate editor of the IEEE Transactions on Power Electronics and IEEE Transactions on Industrial Electronics.

In 2015, he was appointed rector of the Andrés Bello National University. He was previously professor of electrical engineering at the Federico Santa María Technical University, as well as its rector for the periods 2005-2006 (Interim) and 2006-2010 (voted by the University community).

== Honors ==
In 2014 he received Chile's National Prize for Applied Sciences and Technologies.

The same year, he was also ranked by the World Most Influential Scientific Minds, a Thomson Reuters affiliate, as one of 200 highly cited researchers.
