= St. Joseph Cathedral, Temuco =

Roman Catholic cathedral in Temuco, Chile

Coordinates: 38°44′21″S 72°35′25″W

St. Joseph Cathedral
- Catedral de San José
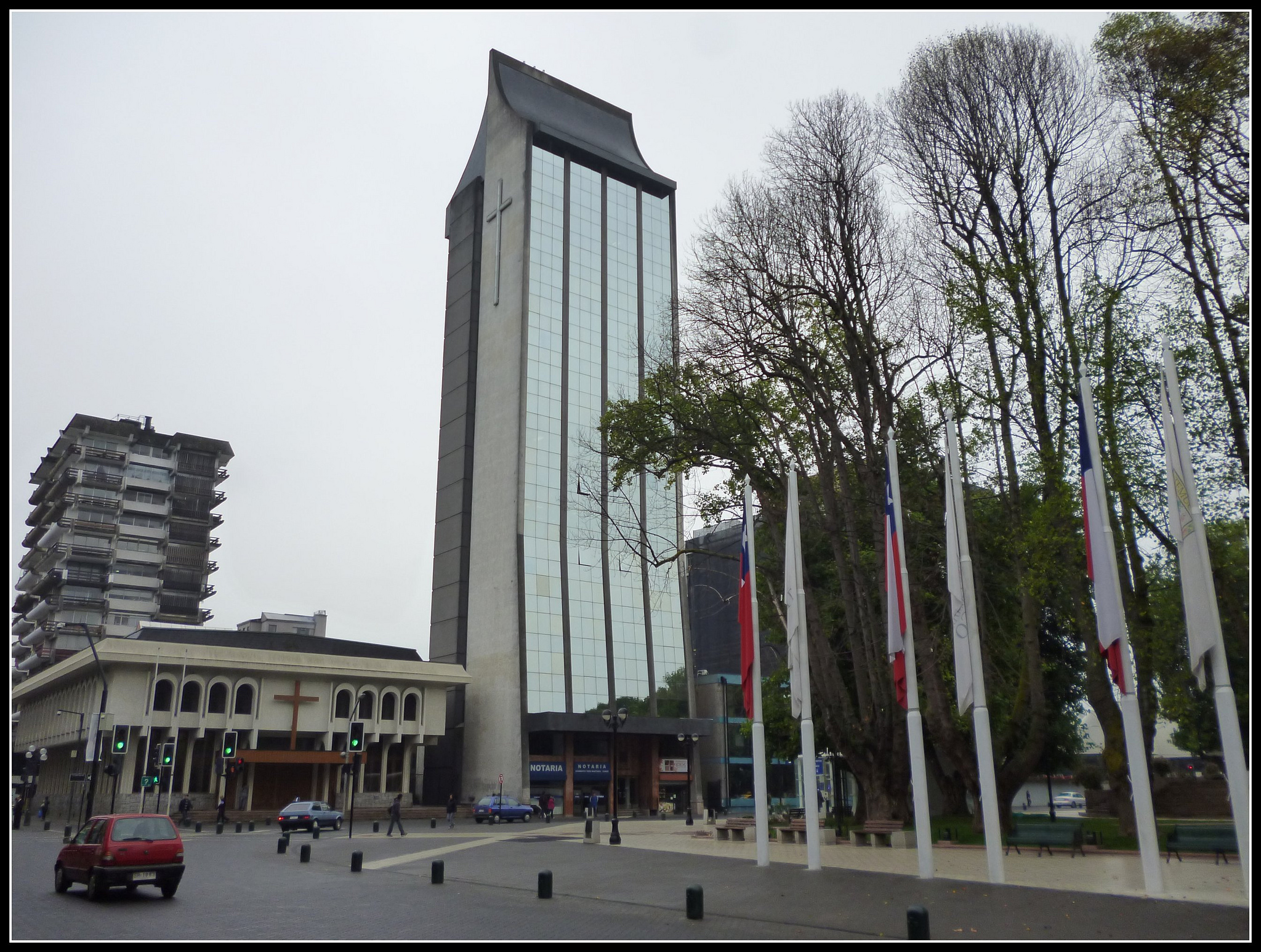
- St. Joseph Cathedral
- Location: Temuco
- Country: Chile
- Denomination: Roman Catholic Church

The St. Joseph Cathedral (Spanish: Catedral de San José), also Temuco Cathedral is a Roman Catholic cathedral in Temuco, Chile. St. Joseph Cathedral is one of the newest ecclesiastical constructions in Chile. From modern lines the new building replaced the old cathedral, which collapsed in the 1960 earthquake. The first stone of the new building was placed on March 19, 1981, for the feast of St. Joseph. It was completed in 1991.

The project selected corresponded to that of the architect Gerardo Rendel. Several fundraising campaigns were carried out, including the call of the square meter, one for the windows, the ceiling and pavement, and the campaign for the pews. There were also contributions from Pope John Paul II and from some foreign Catholic churches.

== See also ==
- Roman Catholicism in Chile

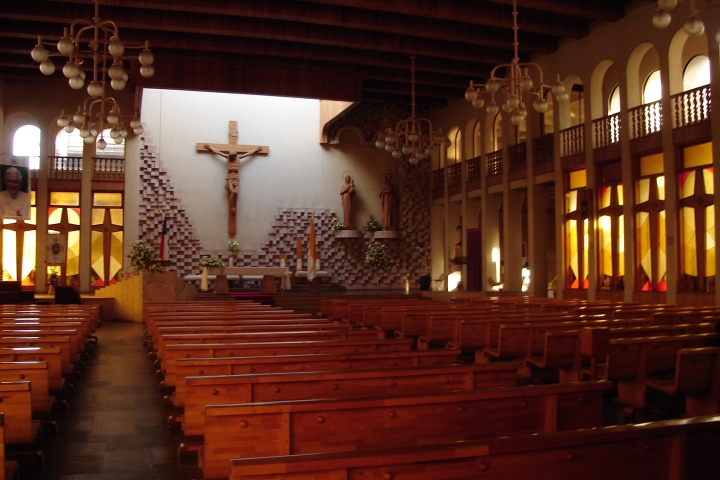
Internal View
