= Fernando Mönckeberg Barros =

Chilean surgeon and doctor (born 1926)

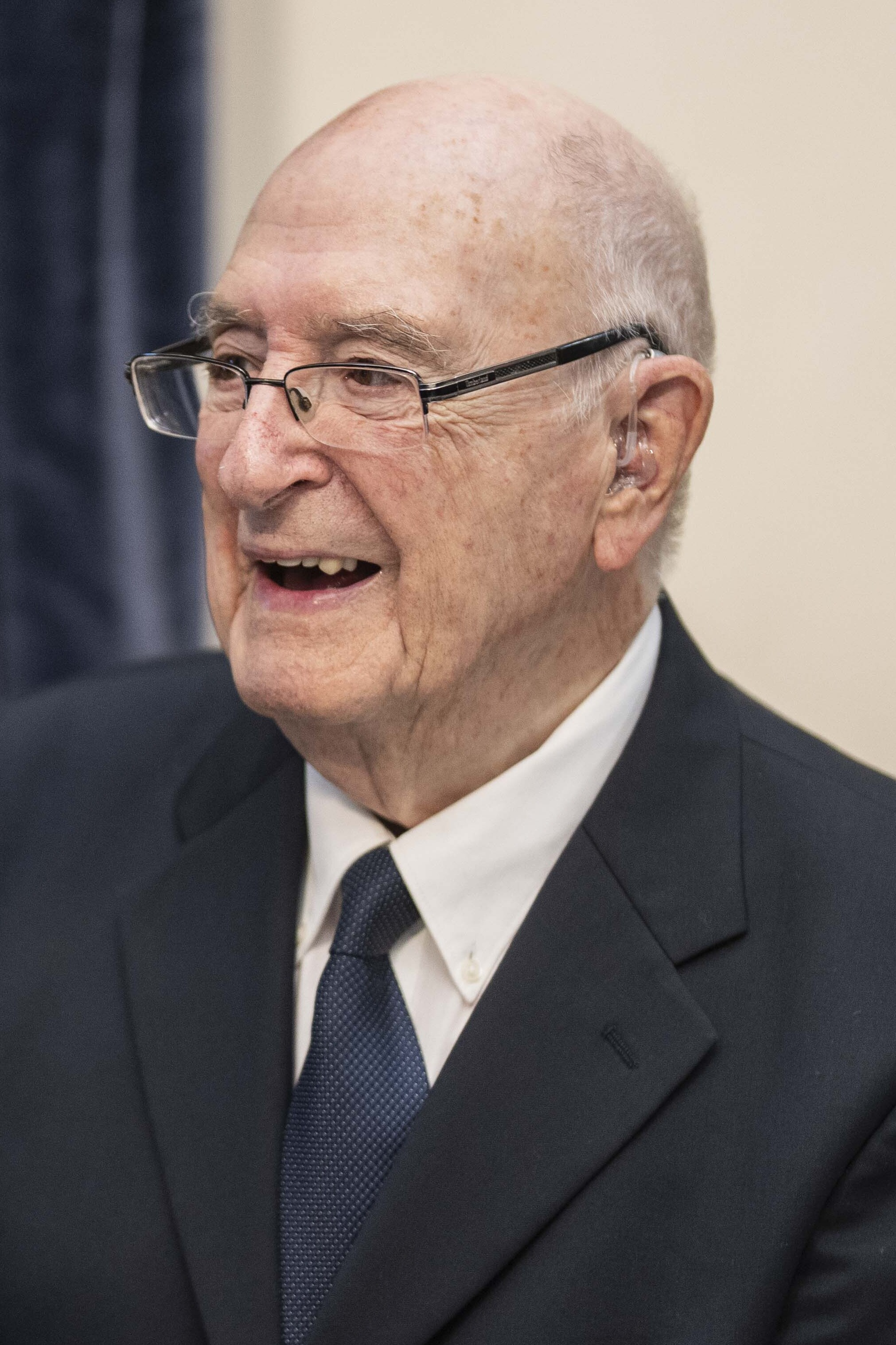
- Dr. Fernando Monckeberg in 2026.
- Born: Fernando Rafael Mönckeberg Barros; 26 June 1926 (age 100); Santiago, Chile
- Education: Harvard University
- Occupations: Physician, academic
- Parents: Gustavo Mönckeberg (father); Beatriz Barros de Mönckeberg (mother)
- Relatives: Gustavo Mönckeberg Barros (brother)
- Awards: Guggenheim Fellowship (1957); National Prize for Applied Sciences and Technologies (1998); National Prize for Medicine (2012)

Fernando Rafael Mönckeberg Barros (born 26 June 1926) is a Chilean surgeon, doctor of medicine specializing in nutrition, professor, researcher, and economist at the University of Chile. He is the founder of the Institute of Nutrition and Food Technology of the University of Chile (INTA) and president of the Corporation for Child Nutrition (CONIN).

== Early life ==
The son of Gustavo Mönckeberg Bravo and Beatriz Barros Calvo, Fernando Rafael Mönckeberg is the brother of gynecologist and politician Gustavo Mönckeberg Barros.

Barros finished his secondary education, overcoming great difficulties due to undiagnosed dyslexia; his grades did not give him many options when applying to universities. He performed military service, where he was assigned to the telecommunications sector. There Barros discovered that telegraphy did not present him with the same problems as writing, so he decided that he would continue in that line of work once his service was finished. However, a woman with whom he had a close relationship for a few years managed to use her influence to allow him to enter the University of Chile, where he graduated with a degree in medicine in 1952. In 1958, Barros did postgraduate studies in biochemistry and teaching at Harvard University.

== Academic career ==
Mönckeberg Barros developed extensive scientific research in the field of child malnutrition in Chile, publishing articles in specialized journals inside and outside the country. He formed CONPAN, an autonomous entity whose objective was the elaboration and coordination of a food and nutrition policy, and he managed to make the country adopt enriched milk. He is the founder and president of the Corporation for Child Nutrition (CONIN).

In 1959, Barros became an associate professor of pediatrics at Harvard University Children's Hospital. In 1965, he became a professor of pediatrics at the University of Chile, as well as president of the Chilean Society of Pediatrics and president of the Latin American Nutrition Society. Two years later Barros founded the Latin American Pediatric Research Society and served as its first president. In 1972, he created INTA, and was its director until 1994. In 1975, he founded CONIN.

From 1994 to 1996, Barros was rector of the Universidad Santo Tomás. From 1998 to 1999, he was rector of the Iberoamerican University of Science and Technology. In 2001, he became dean of the Faculty of Health Sciences at Diego Portales University.

Mönckeberg Barros has been an academic at the "House of Bello" (University of Chile) for more than 30 years. He has been elected an honorary member of national and international institutions, mainly in the pediatric and nutritional fields, including the Chilean Academy of Medicine, the United States Academy of Pediatrics, the Third World Scientific Academy, and academies of England, Spain, Brazil, and Argentina.

Barros was an advisor to specialized committees of the United Nations, Food and Agriculture Organization, UNICEF, and the World Health Organization.

In 1989, Barros tried unsuccessfully to present his candidacy for the Presidency of the Republic in the 1989 election. His application was rejected by the Electoral Service of Chile on 24 August of that year, as his lists of sponsoring voters exceeded the allowed percentage of sponsors registered in political parties.

== Later life ==
On 26 June 2026, Mönchkeberg Barros turned 100.

== Publications ==
In addition to the publication of about 130 articles in specialized journals, Mönckeberg Barros has written some 65 chapters in specialized books, and also 12 of his own works. He is the director of the journal Creces, a publication through which the "Educational program for scientific dissemination" has been developed since 1980, aimed at middle and high school levels and medical professionals, and part of the set of programs implemented by CONIN.

- Jaque al subdesarrollo (1973; translated into several languages)
- Chile y sus recursos naturales (1975)
- Políticas de alimentación y nutrición en Chile (1976)
- Antecedentes y acciones para una política nacional de alimentación y nutrición de Chile (1976)
- Crear para compartir: compartir para seguir creando (1980)
- La revolución de la Bioingeniería (1980)
- Desnutrición infantil: fisiopatología, clínica, tratamiento y prevención: nuestra experiencia y contribución (1988)
- Chile en la encrucijada: decisiones para una nueva era (1989)
- Jaque al subdesarrollo, ahora (1993)
- Ciencia y tecnología (1994)
- Desnutrición: el mal oculto (2004)
- Contra viento y marea. Hasta erradicar la desnutrición (2010)

== Honors ==
- 1957 – Guggenheim Fellowship
- 1975 – ICARE Award
- 1979 – Pan American Health Education Foundation Award
- 1985 – Award of the American Academy of Pediatrics, for worldwide pediatrician of the year
- 1985 – Award of the World Foundation for Health and Peace
- 1993 – Award of the International Union of Nutritional Sciences
- 1995 – Doctor Honoris Causa from the University of Valladolid
- 1998 – National Prize for Applied Sciences and Technologies
- 1999 – Award of the Medical Scientific Societies of Chile
- 2000 – Academic Excellence Award of the Chilean Society of Pediatrics
- 2005 – Bicentennial Award, granted by the Cultural Heritage Corporation of Chile jointly with the University of Chile and the Presidential Advisory Commission for the Bicentennial of the Republic
- 2007 – Recognition of career and fundamental contribution to nutrition in Chile, from the Granotec Technological Center, CTG-OTEC, during the 5th Seminar on Healthy Lifestyles
- Doctor Honoris Causa of the National University of Cuyo, Argentina
- Fellow of the American Society for Nutrition
- 2010 – Revista de Libros Award for Contra viento y marea. Hasta erradicar la desnutrición
- 2012 – National Prize for Medicine
