= Leopoldo Soto Norambuena =

Chilean physicist

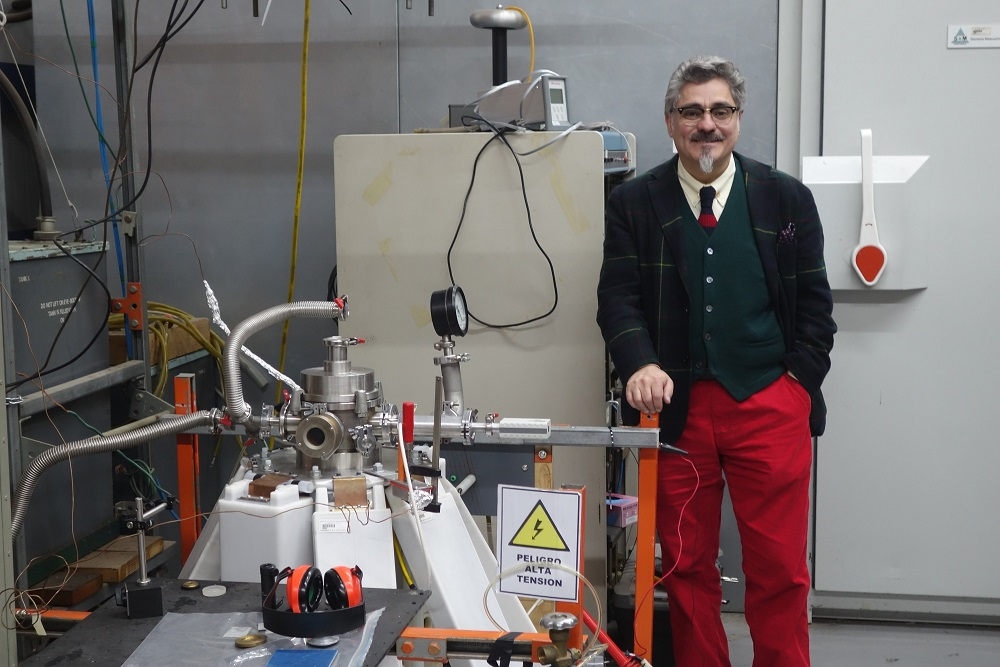
- Born: Chile
- Education: Pontificia Universidad Católica de Chile
- Known for: Dense plasma focus
- Scientific career
- Fields: Physics
- Doctoral advisor: Hernán Chuaqui

Leopoldo Soto Norambuena (born October 14, 1964), who publishes as Leopoldo Soto, is a Chilean physicist. He works at the Comisión Chilena de Energía Nuclear, where he founded the Plasma Physics and Nuclear Fusion Laboratory. His main contributions are in experimental physics (plasma physics in particular).

The group that he created and leads works on miniaturizing dense plasma focus devices which can produce similar physics to that obtained in large devices which are only available in large laboratories around the world.

He received the B.S., M.S. and Ph.D. degrees in Physics in 1989, 1990 and 1993, respectively, from the Pontificia Universidad Católica de Chile. His Ph.D. thesis was advised by Hernán Chuaqui, and was the first to be granted by a Chilean University in experimental physics. The results of his thesis were published in the journal Physical Review Letters.

When he arrived at the Comisión Chilena de Energía Nuclear, he started to work in plasmas driven by small transient electrical discharges and small pulsed power devices: z-pinch, capillary discharges and plasma focus. His work has contributed to scaling plasma focuses for a wide range of energies and sizes, keeping the same value of ion density, magnetic field, plasma sheath velocity, Alfvén speed and the quantity of energy per particle. Therefore, fusion reactions are possible to be obtained in ultra-miniaturized devices (driven by generators of 0.1 Joules for example), as well as they are obtained in bigger devices (driven by generators of 1 megajoule). However, the stability of the plasma pinch highly depends on the size and energy of the device.

A rich plasma phenomenology it has been observed in the table-top plasma focus devices developed by Soto's group: filamentary structures, toroidal singularities, plasma bursts and plasma jets generations. In addition, possible applications are explored using these kind of small plasma devices: development of portable generator as non-radioactive sources of neutrons and x-rays for field applications, pulsed radiation applied to biological studies, plasma focus as neutron source for nuclear fusion-fission hybrid reactors, and the use of plasma focus devices as plasma accelerators for studies of materials under intense fusion-relevant pulses.

In 1999, he was awarded with a Presidential Chair in Science by the president of Chile. In 2007, he was elected as Fellow of the Institute of Physics, UK. He was the president of the Chilean Physical Society for 2 periods, from April 2003 to April 2008, and its secretary general from April 2013 to April 2015.
