= Pontifical Catholic University of Chile =

Private university in Santiago, Chile

Coordinates: 33.4411°S 70.6408°W

- Pontificia Universidad Católica de Chile
- Motto: In Christi lumine pro mundi vita
- Motto in English: In the light of Christ for the life of the world
- Type: Private Research University
- Established: 21 June 1888; 138 years ago
- Religious affiliation: Catholic Church
- Academic affiliations: Clover 2030 Engineering, Triple accreditation
- Chancellor: Fernando Chomalí Garib, Archbishop of Santiago
- Rector: Juan Carlos de la Llera
- Faculty: 1,652 (full-time)
- Administrative staff: 2,210 (full-time)
- Students: 33,769
- Undergraduates: 29,212
- Postgraduates: 4,557
- Location: Avenida Libertador General Bernardo O'Higgins #340, Santiago, Santiago Metropolitan Region, Chile
- Mascot: Pangui
- Website: www.uc.cl

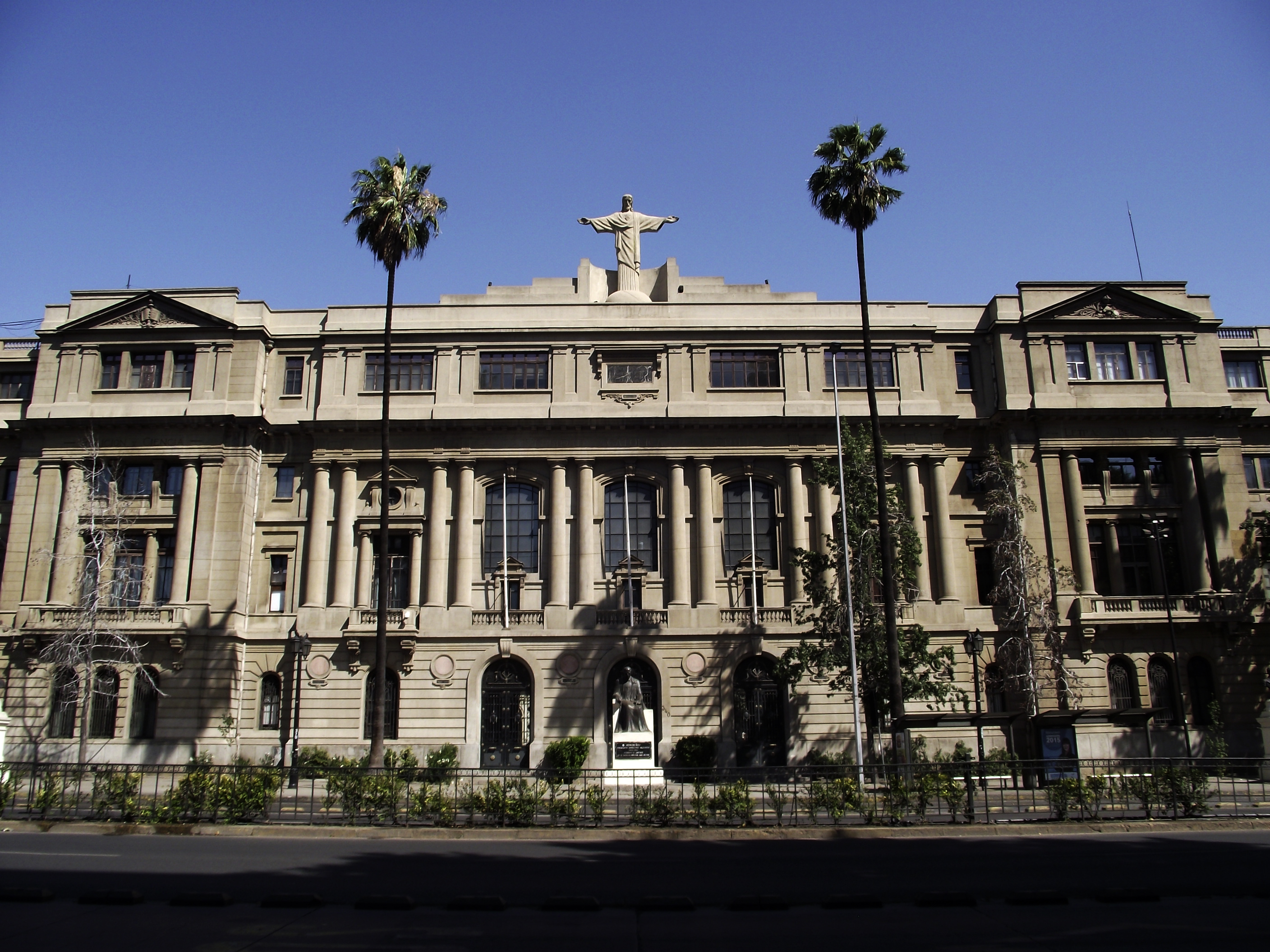
The headquarters of the UC

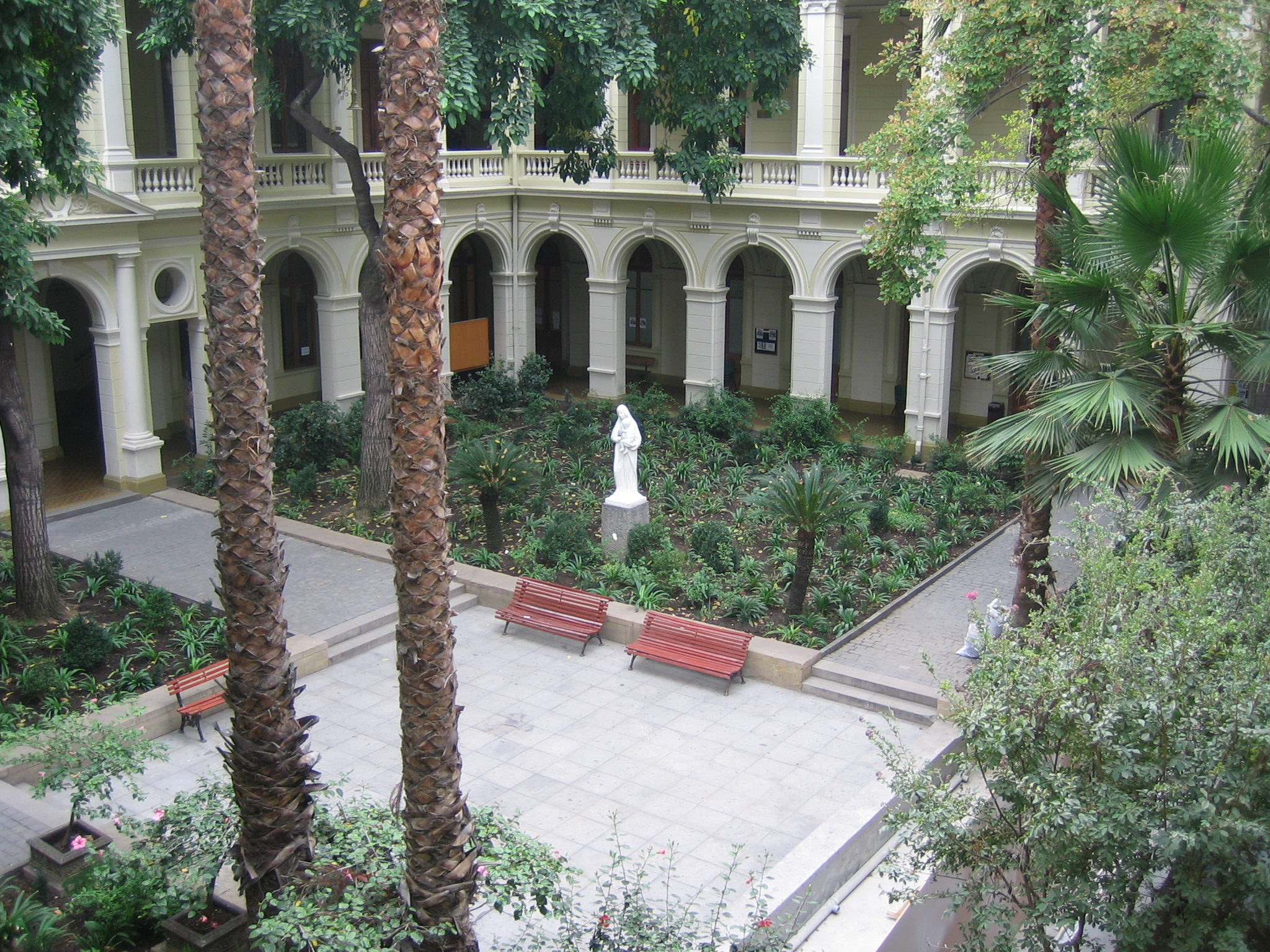
Inside Casa Central

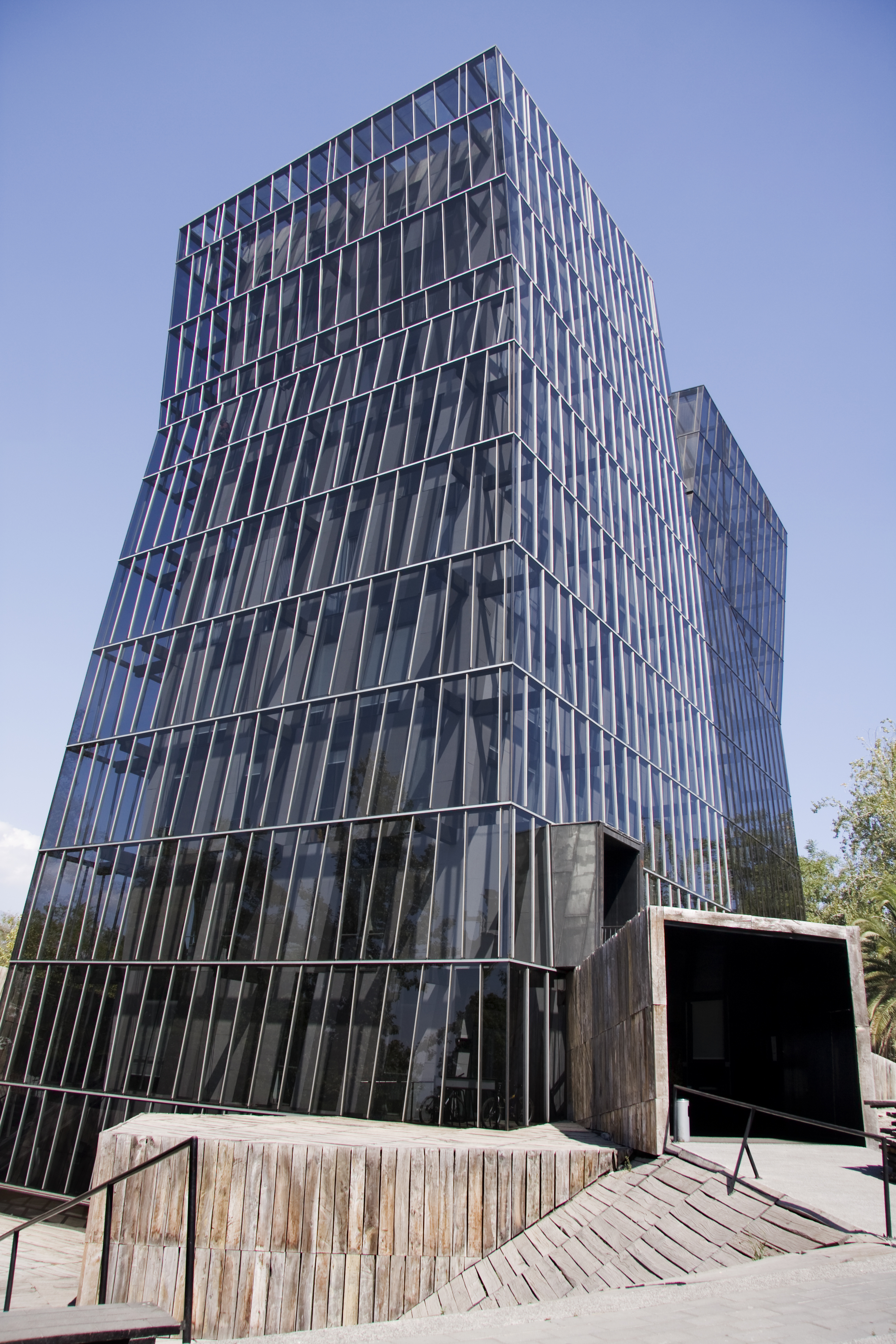
The "Siamese Towers", a workshop building at the San Joaquín campus, and winner of the Pritzker Architecture Prize.

The Pontifical Catholic University of Chile (UC Chile; Spanish: Pontificia Universidad Católica de Chile) is a private research university in Santiago, Chile. It is one of the thirteen Catholic universities existing in the Chilean university system and one of the two pontifical universities in the country, along with the Pontifical Catholic University of Valparaíso. Founded in 1888, it is one of Chile's oldest universities. It is ranked among the top universities in Latin America (2nd in the region and 93rd in the world as per QS Ranking 2025).

Being two of the oldest schools in the country, Pontifical Catholic University of Chile has a long-standing rivalry with the University of Chile. This rivalry is notable in sports, such as football, and is partially attributed to the schools traditional religious differences.

== Campuses ==
UC Chile has four campuses in Santiago and one campus in Villarrica. The campuses in Santiago are:

- Casa Central (in downtown Santiago)
- San Joaquín (in Macul Commune of Greater Santiago)
- Oriente (in Providencia Commune of Greater Santiago)
- Lo Contador (in Providencia Commune of Greater Santiago)

These four campuses have a total of 223,326.06 m^{2} (267,095.74 sq yd) constructed in a 614,569.92 m^{2} (735,019.51 sq yd) area. The Villarrica campus has 1,664 m^{2} (1,990 sq yd) constructed in a 2,362.5 m^{2} (2,825.5 sq yd) area.

== History ==
UC Chile was founded on 21 June 1888, by the Archbishop of Santiago, to offer training in traditional professions (law) and in technological and practical fields such as business, accounting, chemistry, and electricity. Its first chancellor was Monsignor Joaquín Larraín Gandarillas, and at the very beginning, the university only taught two subjects, law and mathematics. Since it is a Pontifical University, it has always had a strong and very close relationship with the Vatican. On 11 February 1930, Pope Pius XI declared it a pontifical university, and in 1931 it was granted full academic autonomy by the Chilean government.

UC Chile is a private, urban, multi-campus university. It is one of the eleven Chilean Catholic universities, and one of the twenty-five institutions within the Rectors' Council (Consejo de Rectores), the Chilean state-sponsored university system. It is part of the Universities of the Rectors' Council of Chilean Universities, and although it is not state-owned, a substantial part of its budget is given by state transfers under different programs.

UC Chile's 18 faculties are distributed through four campuses in Santiago and one regional campus located in southern Chile. The technical training centers affiliated with the university are: Duoc UC, the Rural Life Foundations, the Baviera Foundation, the Catechetical Home and the San Fidel Seminary. These centers carry out technical-academic extension activities in rural and agricultural areas. Other UC activities are a Sports Club, and a Clinical Hospital dependent on the Faculty of Medicine.

UC Chile's Graduates of the School of Architecture (one of the most prominent in Latin America) have also made important contributions to the country with such work as the Central Building ("Casa Central") of UC, and the National Library.

Two of its most important alumni are the Jesuit Saint Alberto Hurtado and Eduardo Frei Montalva, a Chilean president. Both of them studied in the School of Laws. Sebastián Piñera, former Chilean president, graduated from the university's School of Economics.

In 2017 the university faced what has been called a "wave of suicide" among its students. During 2017 a total of four students have taken their lives up to October, the previous year two students committed suicide. Critics, including alumni, have written about the university's "lack of concern" for the suicide of students, an attitude they contrast to the university's staunch opposition to abortion. The student union of the university issued a communique expressing feelings of guilt over the issue and the need to take charge.

== Collaborations ==
The Department of Industry and System Engineering is engaging Stanford Technology Venture Program of Stanford University on a collaboration on innovation and technology ventures.

In December 2011, the schools of engineering of PUC and the University of Notre Dame signed an agreement to establish a dual graduate degree in civil engineering and the geological sciences, which now extends to other departments in both schools.

In April 2013, UC Chile and the University of Notre Dame also signed a memorandum of understanding to strengthen scholarly engagement and expand their long-standing relationships. The agreement establishes an exchange program in which faculty, doctoral students and university representatives from each institution will visit, work, study and collaborate with the other institution.

== World rankings ==
University rankings

Global – Overall
- ARWU World: 501-600 (2022)
- CWUR World: 390 (2023)
- CWTS World: 555 (2023)
- QS World: 93 (2025)
- THE World: 401–500 (2023)
- USNWR Global: =314 (2022-23)

Regional – Overall
- QS Latin America: 1 (2023)
- THE Latin America: 3 (2026)
- USNWR Latin America: 3 (2022-23)

UC ranks among the first 10 Latin-American Universities according to the Shanghai ranking, UC appears top in two subject rankings: it ranks around 101–150 in Economics and Management and around 151–200 in Mathematics.

Pontificia Universidad Católica de Chile has been ranked as the best university in Latin America by two of the world's most prestigious University rankings, the QS World University Rankings (in 2018, 2019, 2020, 2021, 2022 and 2023) and the Times Higher Education University Rankings (2019 and 2020).

== Faculties, institutes, centers and subjects offered ==
- College UC
  - Bachelor of Natural Sciences and Mathematics
  - Bachelor of Social Science
  - Bachelor of Arts and Humanities
- Faculty of Agronomy & Forest Engineering
  - Agronomy
  - Forest Engineering
- Faculty of Architecture, Design, and Urban Studies
  - School of Architecture
    - Architecture
  - School of Design
    - Design
  - Institute of Urban and Territorial Studies
    - Urban Planning
- Faculty of Arts
  - School of Visual Art
    - Visual Art
  - School of Theater
    - Acting
  - Institute of Music
    - Music
- Faculty of Biological Sciences
  - Biology (with an academic major in "Natural Resources & Environment" or "Bioprocesses")
  - Biochemistry
  - Marine Biology
- Faculty of Economic and Administrative Sciences
  - Commercial Engineering
  - Economics Institute
  - School of Administration
- Faculty of Social Sciences
  - Institute of Sociology
    - Sociology
  - School of Anthropology
    - Anthropology
    - Archaeology
  - School of Psychology
    - Psychology
  - School of Social Work
    - Social Work
- Faculty of Communications
  - School of Journalism
    - Journalism
    - Audiovisual Direction Program
    - Advertising
  - Institute of Media Studies
- Faculty of Law
  - Law
- Faculty of Language and Literature
  - English Language and Literature
  - Hispanic American Linguistics and Literature
  - Center for the Study of Chilean Literature (CELICH)
- Faculty of Education
  - Early Childhood Education
  - General Education
  - High School Education
- Faculty of Engineering
  - School of Engineering
    - Dept. of Computer Science
    - Dept. of Engineering and Construction Management
    - Dept. of Structural and Geotechnical Engineering
    - Dept. of Hydraulic and Environmental Engineering
    - Dept. of Transportation and Logistics Engineering
    - Dept. of Industrial and Systems Engineering
    - Dept. of Mechanical and Metallurgical Engineering
    - Dept. of Chemical and Bioprocess Engineering
    - Dept. of Electrical Engineering
    - Dept. of Mining Engineering
  - School of Construction
    - Construction
- Faculty of Philosophy
  - Institute of Philosophy
    - Philosophy
  - Institute of Aesthetics
    - Aesthetics
- Faculty of Physics
  - Department of Astronomy and Astrophysics
    - Astronomy
  - Department of Physics
    - Physics
- Faculty of History, Geography, and Political Science
  - Institute of History
    - History
  - Institute of Geography
    - Geography
  - Institute of Political Science
    - Political Science
- Faculty of Mathematics
  - Mathematics
  - Statistics
- Faculty of Medicine
  - School of Medicine
    - Medicine
    - Odontology
    - Phonoaudiology
    - Kinesiology
    - Nutrition and dietetics
  - School of Nursing
    - Nursing and Obstetrics
- Faculty of Chemistry
  - Chemistry
  - Chemistry and Pharmacy
- Faculty of Theology
  - Theology
- Institute for Biological and Medical Engineering
  - Biomedical Engineering
- Institute for Mathematical and Computational Engineering
  - Data Science Engineering
- School of Veterinary Medicine
  - Veterinary Medicine

=== Notable institutes and centers ===
- Center of Studies of Social Undertakings
- Instituto Milenio para la Investigación en Depresión y Personalidad – MIDAP
- Núcleo Milenio Research Center in Entrepreneurial Strategy Under Uncertainty

== Notable alumni ==
=== Architecture ===
- Alejandro Aravena (2016 Pritzker Architecture Prize winner)
- Smiljan Radić Clarke (2026 Pritzker Architecture Prize winner)
- Juan Grimm, Landscape architect

=== Art and literature ===
- Egon Wolff (playwright)
- Roberto Matta (Surrealist painter)
- Diamela Eltit (author)
- Paula Escobar (journalist and academic)
- Laila Havilio (sculptor)

=== Economics ===
- Miguel Kast (former governor of the Central Bank of Chile. Member of the Chicago Boys group)
- José Piñera
- Joaquín Lavín
- Sebastián Edwards (professor, UCLA Anderson School of Management)
- Sebastián Piñera
- Felipe Larraín
- Ricardo J. Caballero (Ford International Professor of Economics - MIT)

=== Politics ===
- Eduardo Frei Montalva, Former President of Chile
- Sebastián Piñera, Former President of Chile
- Adolfo Zaldívar
- Arturo Frei Bolívar
- Ena von Baer, Former Minister
- Hernán Larraín
- Fernando Flores
- Jaime Guzmán
- Joaquín Lavín
- Osvaldo Andrade
- Radomiro Tomic
- Tomás Jocelyn-Holt
- José Antonio Kast, President of Chile
- Giorgio Jackson
- Manuel José Irarrázaval Larraín

=== Religion ===
- Alberto Hurtado, Jesuit and Chile's second saint
- Raúl Silva Henríquez, Archbishop of Santiago de Chile

Both studied law at the university.

=== Science ===
- Juan Carlos Castilla (marine life expert)
- Leopoldo Soto Norambuena (former President of the Chilean Physics Society and Fellow of the Institute of Physics, UK)
- Nibaldo Inestrosa Cantin (neurobiologist)
- Neva Milicic Müller (psychologist)

== Knowledge transfer, service and consultancy ==
- DICTUC SA (a group of 40+ consultancies leading in engineering, management and innovation)
- Salud Clinica UC
- Hospital of the Pontificia Universidad Catolica de Chile
- Mega UC Health Centres (maternity)
