= National Prize =

National Prize may refer to:

== Chile ==
- Chilean National History Award, established 1974
- National Prize for Journalism (Chile), established 1954
- National Prize for Literature (Chile), established 1942
- National Prize of Art of Chile, given 1944–1992
- National Prize of Chile, established 1942
- National Prize for Education Sciences (Chile), established 1979
- National Prize for Humanities and Social Sciences (Chile), established 1992
- National Prize for Medicine, established 2001

== Spain ==
- List of National Prizes (Ministry of Culture, Spain), awarded by Spain's Ministry of Culture
- National Literature Prize for Narrative (Spain), established 1924
- National Prize for Asturian Literature, Spain, established 2017
- National Theater Prize, Spain
- Premio Nacional de las Letras Españolas (National Prize for Spanish Literature), established 1984
- National Music Prize (Catalonia)

== Elsewhere ==
- Magón National Prize for Culture, Costa Rica, established 1961
- National Prize for Literature (Cuba), established 1983
- German National Prize for Art and Science, Germany, given 1937–1939
- National Prize of the German Democratic Republic, East Germany, given 1949–1989
- Miguel Ángel Asturias National Prize in Literature, Guatemala, established 1988
- Lithuanian National Prize for Culture and Arts, Lithuania, established 1989
- National Prize for Arts and Sciences (Mexico), Mexico, established 1945
- José Fuentes Mares National Prize for Literature, Mexico, established 1985
- National Reunification Prize, an award of North Korea
- Shevchenko National Prize, Ukraine, established 1961
- Bobbitt National Prize for Poetry, United States, established 1990
- National Prize for Literature (Venezuela), established 1948
- National Prize of Plastic Arts of Venezuela,

== See also ==
- National Prize for Literature
