= Tito Ureta =

Chilean scientist (born 1935)

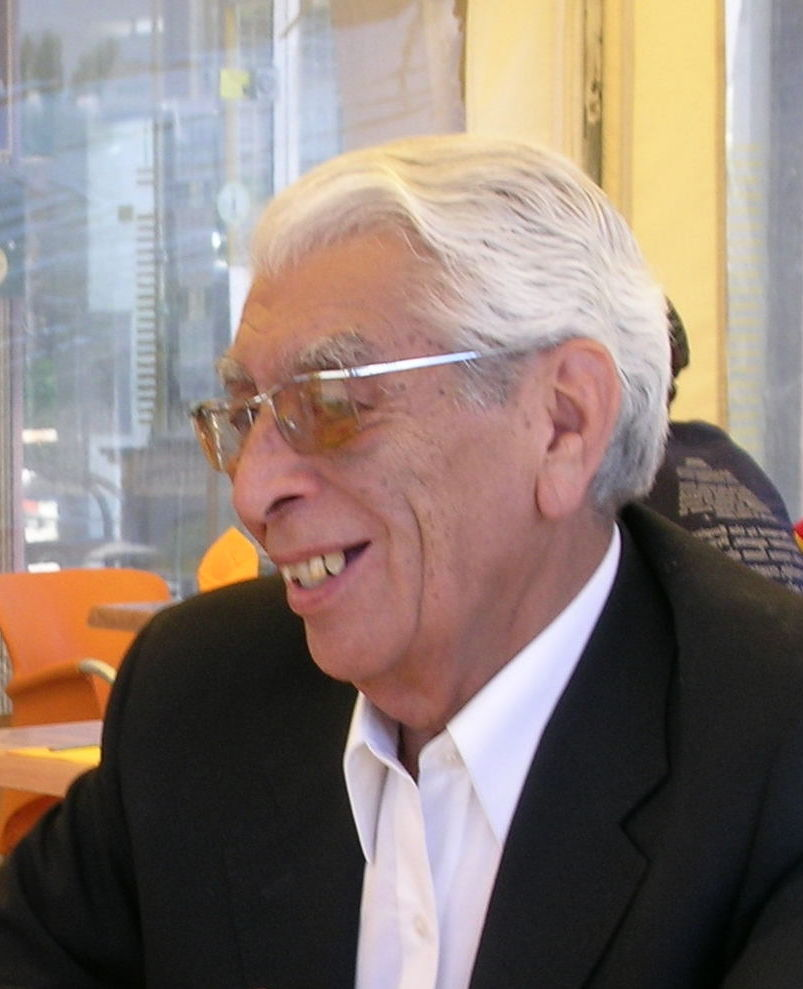
- Born: Tito Ureta Aravena; 10 October 1935; Iquique, Chile
- Died: 9 June 2012 (aged 76); Santiago, Chile
- Education: University of Chile
- Scientific career
- Fields: Hexokinases, protein evolution
- Workplaces: University of Chile, Rockefeller University, New York
- Thesis: Formas moleculares multiples de ATP-D-hexosa 6-fosfotransferasa (1982)
- Academic advisors: Hermann Niemeyer, Fritz Albert Lipmann

Tito Ureta Aravena (1935–2012) was a Chilean biochemist, known for studies of hexokinases in many organisms.

== Personal life ==
Tito Ureta was born on 10 October 1935 in Iquique, Chile, where he was educated at the Domingo Santa María School, and in the Liceo José Victorino Lastarria (Santiago). He married Sara Elfriede Herbstaedt Yáñez.

== Education and early research ==
Ureta's first university studies at the University of Chile were in medicine, and he qualified as a surgeon in 1963. However, his interest turned to biochemistry and he devoted his career to research and experimental work, on hexokinases in particular.

In 1960 he joined the group of Hermann Niemeyer, with whom he obtained his doctorate on the basis of a thesis on the purification and characterization of the enzyme responsible for phosphorylation of glucose in the mammalian liver.

He completed his training in a post-doctoral period in the laboratory of Fritz Lipmann at the Rockefeller University in New York.

== Research career ==
Ureta devoted much of his career to the study of hexokinases, mainly in mammals, but also in many other organisms, such as birds, amphibians, other vertebrates, and fungi.

Ureta and colleagues determined that there were four isoenzymes of hexokinase in rat liver, and proposed the sequence A, B, C, D on the basis of the order of elution from chromatographic columns of DEAE cellulose. A little later Katzen and colleagues observed the same order for starch-gel electrophoresis and designated the isoenzymes as I, II, III and IV, a terminology that has been widely adopted, for example, by Agius and colleagues.

Hexokinase A (or I), predominant in brain, hexokinase B (or II), predominant in muscle, and hexokinase D (or IV), predominant in liver hexokinase (or “glucokinase”), have been extensively studied, but hexokinase C (or III) has received rather little attention, and Ureta is one of the few who have studied its properties.

His study of the hexokinase isoenzymes in the rat led to a more general interest in the role of isoenzymes in metabolism. His comparison of hexokinases from a wide variety of sources stimulated a detailed study of the evolution of their structures.

His interest was later devoted to the study of metabolic regulation in vivo, especially in relation to glycolysis, the pentose phosphate pathway and glycogen synthesis. For these studies he used frog oocytes as a convenient tool, and he advocated their wide use.

== Books ==
In his books (in Spanish) Ureta set out to bring his ideas on protein evolution and on philosophy to a broad public. In his preface to the latter book Humberto Maturana wrote as follows:

Éste es un libro enorme, no en su tamaño físico pero sí en su contenido. Abarca todas las dilensiones humanas, tanto de la persona como objeto de la atención del autor como en lo que revela acerca de este mismo.

(This is a huge book, not in its physical size, but in its content. It covers all human dimensions, both in terms of the person as the object of the author's attention and in what it reveals about the person.)

== Society and editorial activities ==
Ureta was President of the Society of Biology of Chile in 1977–1978, and of the Society of Biochemistry and Molecular Biology of Chile in 1983–1984 and participated in various other societies in Europe and in the USA.

Between 1978 and 1992 he was Editor of Archivos de Biología y Medicina Experimentales, the principal journal of experimental biology in Chile, now called Biological Research.

In 2012 the Society of Biochemistry and Molecular Biology of Chile created the Tito Ureta Prize in his memory. Notable recipients include Jorge Allende, Marta Bunster, María Luz Cárdenas, Cecilia Hidalgo Tapia and Pablo Valenzuela.

== Selected works ==
=== Books ===
- Ureta, Tito (2010). Origen y evolución de proteínas y enzimas [Origin and evolution of proteins and enzymes] (in Spanish). Santiago: Editorial Universitaria. ISBN 978-956-11-2100-3.
- Ureta, Tito (2013). En el filo de la navaja de Occam [On the edge of Occam's razor] (in Spanish). Preface by Humberto Maturana. Santiago: Editorial Universitaria. ISBN 978-956-11-1687-0.
