= Jeanne Lafortune =

Canadian economist

- Education: McGill University (BA); University of Toronto (MA); Massachusetts Institute of Technology (PhD)
- Occupations: Associate Professor & Director of Research at the Pontifical Catholic University of Chile
- Website: https://sites.google.com/site/jeannelafortune/

Jeanne Lafortune is a Canadian economist who currently works as aa full professor in Economics and director of pesearch at the Pontifical Catholic University of Chile. She is also a researcher at the Abdul Latif Jameel Poverty Action Lab (J-PAL LAC), which is a global research center that aims to reduce poverty and improve life quality of people in the Caribbean and Latin America. Lafortune holds a Ph.D. in economics from the Massachusetts Institute of Technology (MIT), Cambridge, Massachusetts. Her research interests focus on three main fields, including economic history, family and development economics.

== Education and work ==
Lafortune graduated with a B.A. in economics (with honors) and Minor in international development from McGill University in 2002. She then received her M.A. in economics from the University of Toronto in 2003. She further pursued her studies and earned her Ph.D. in economics from the Massachusetts Institute of Technology (MIT) in 2008, where she wrote her final dissertation "Essays on Matching, Marriage and Human Capital Accumulation". She also served for the Government of Canada as an economist at the Economic Studies and Policy Analysis Division for the Department of Finance from 2003 to 2004.

== Career and research ==
Lafortune's research focus revolves around three fields:

- Labor Economics
- Family Economics
- Development Economics

=== Selected works ===
==== Working paper ====
“Baby Commodity-Booms? The Impact of Commodity Shocks on Fertility Decisions and Outcomes"

In this research paper, Lafortune collaborates with Francisco Gallego to analyze how economic booms impact fertility rates of families in small, emerging, and open economies. Drawing from previous works on the topic, Lafortune re-evaluates empirical data that suggests a positive relationship between economic prosperity and birth rates and its relationship to family formation variance while there is limited evidence regarding the relationship between births and worse health outcomes of infants. For instance, the authors found that the birth rate increases during economically prosperous periods, but this is due to the expansion of families formed before the boom rather than the creation of new families during these periods. The opportunity costs faced by women to choose to have or not to have children are influenced by public policy. Additionally, the opportunity costs are different among women starting a family and women having more children, a present gap in previous literature. For example, for first-time mothers, an improvement in economic opportunities might reduce their desire to have a child since it interrupts their work life, however women who already have a child are less likely to be working and appear to be in favour of expanding their existing family during better economic conditions. In the future, Lafortune and Gallego suggest research to focus on the impact of fatherhood on their assessments.

==== Publication ====
"Marry for What? Caste and Mate Selection in Modern India"

Lafortune writes this paper in collaboration with economists Abhijit Banerjee, Esther Duflo and Maitreesh Ghatak for the American Economic Journal. The study focuses on the influence caste systems have on marriage decisions among men and women in India, over economic differentials. This question is relevant since it accounts for “status”-like attributes (caste) that are missing in the literature of marriage economics, suggesting that economic reasons are the main influence regarding marriage choices in India and other developing countries. Lafortune and her colleagues found that caste is highly valued by Indians who are looking to get married. Yet, data suggests that this trend might be changing in the future as 30 percent of people in the sample married outside their caste (a trade-off between caste and higher economic status, education, and/or beauty). Control variables include age, education, wage, location, family origins, and height. Additionally, the next generation of the respondents will eventually marry through a channel of friends and family networks instead of ads. The authors conclude that caste preference has not been undermined by economic forces, but the changing trends on these preferences should be analyzed further.

=== Research publications ===
- Lafortune, J. (2013). Making yourself attractive: Pre-marital investments and the returns to education in the marriage market. American Economic Journal: Applied Economics, 5(2), 151–178.
- Banerjee, A., Duflo, E., Ghatak, M., & Lafortune, J. (2013). Marry for what? caste and mate selection in modern India. American Economic Journal: Microeconomics, 5(2), 33–72.
- Gross, T., Lafortune, J., & Low, C. (2014). What happens the morning after? the costs and benefits of expanding access to emergency contraception. Journal of Policy Analysis and Management, 33(1), 70–93.
- Lafortune, J., & Lee, S. (2014). All for one?: Family size and children's educational distribution under credit constraints. The American Economic Review, 104(5), 365–369.
- Covarrubias, M., Lafortune, J., & Tessada, J. (2015). Who comes and why? determinants of immigrants skill level in the early xxth century us. Journal of Demographic Economics, 81(1), 115–155.
- Lafortune, J., Tessada, J., & González-Velosa, C. (2015). More hands, more power? estimating the impact of immigration on output and technology choices using early 20th century US agriculture. Journal of International Economics, 97(2), 339–358.
- Lafortune, J., & Low, C. (2017). Tying the double-knot: The role of assets in marriage commitment. American Economic Review, 107(5), 163–167. doi:10.1257/aer.p20171058
- Chiappori, P., Iyigun, M., Lafortune, J., & Weiss, Y. (2017). Changing the rules midway: The impact of granting alimony rights on existing and newly formed partnerships. The Economic Journal, 127(604), 1874–1905.
- Lafortune, J., Lewis, E., & Tessada, J. (2019). People and machines: A look at the evolving relationship between capital and skill in manufacturing, 1860–1930, using immigration shocks. The Review of Economics and Statistics, 101(1), 30–43.

== Teaching ==
Lafortune started as an assistant professor at the University of Maryland College of Behavioral and Social Sciences in the U.S. from 2008 to 2012. She worked in the Department of Economics at the Pontifical Catholic University of Chile (UC) as an assistant professor from 2010 to 2015, where she later became associate professor in 2015. Along her teaching experience, she has taught economics courses at both undergraduate and graduate level.

On May 27, 2022, she was promoted to full professorship of economics at UC in Chile.

- At the University of Maryland:

Course	Undergraduate	Graduate
Intermediate Microeconomic Analysis	• ECON326	
Topics in Economic Development	•	ECON616

- At the Pontifical Catholic University of Chile (UC):

Course	Undergraduate	Graduate
Intermediate Microeconomics	• EAE210B	
Topics in Economic Development		• EAE3975
Topics in Applied Econometrics		• EAE3512

== Grants and awards ==
Year	Grant/Award	Institution
2018	Fondecyt Regular, Principal Investigator	Comisión Nacional de Investigación Científica y Tecnológica (CONICYT)
2017	Excellence in Teaching Award	Pontifical Catholic University of Chile (UC)
2016 and 2019	Fondecyt Regular, Co-PI	Comisión Nacional de Investigación Científica y Tecnológica (CONICYT)
2015	Fondecyt Regular, Principal Investigator	Comisión Nacional de Investigación Científica y Tecnológica (CONICYT)
2014	City-IPA Financial Capability Grant	Innovations for Poverty Action (IPA)
2013	GDN-CAF RRC Project	Global Development Network (GDN)
2012	Programa Asociativo de Investigacion	Comisión Nacional de Investigación Científica y Tecnológica (CONICYT)
2012	Concurso Inicio	Pontifical Catholic University of Chile (UC)
2004-2006	Graduate Fellowship	Massachusetts Institute of Technology (MIT)
2004-2005	Ida Green Fellowship for most promising female graduate student	Massachusetts Institute of Technology (MIT)
2004-2008	Doctoral Scholarship	Social Sciences and Humanities Council of Canada

== Affiliations ==
- Abdul Latif Jameel Poverty Action Lab
- Facultad de Ciencias Económicas y Administrativas de la Pontificia Universidad Católica de Chile
- Institute of Labor Economics (IZA)
