= Eric Goles =

Chilean mathematician and computer scientist

Eric Goles Chacc
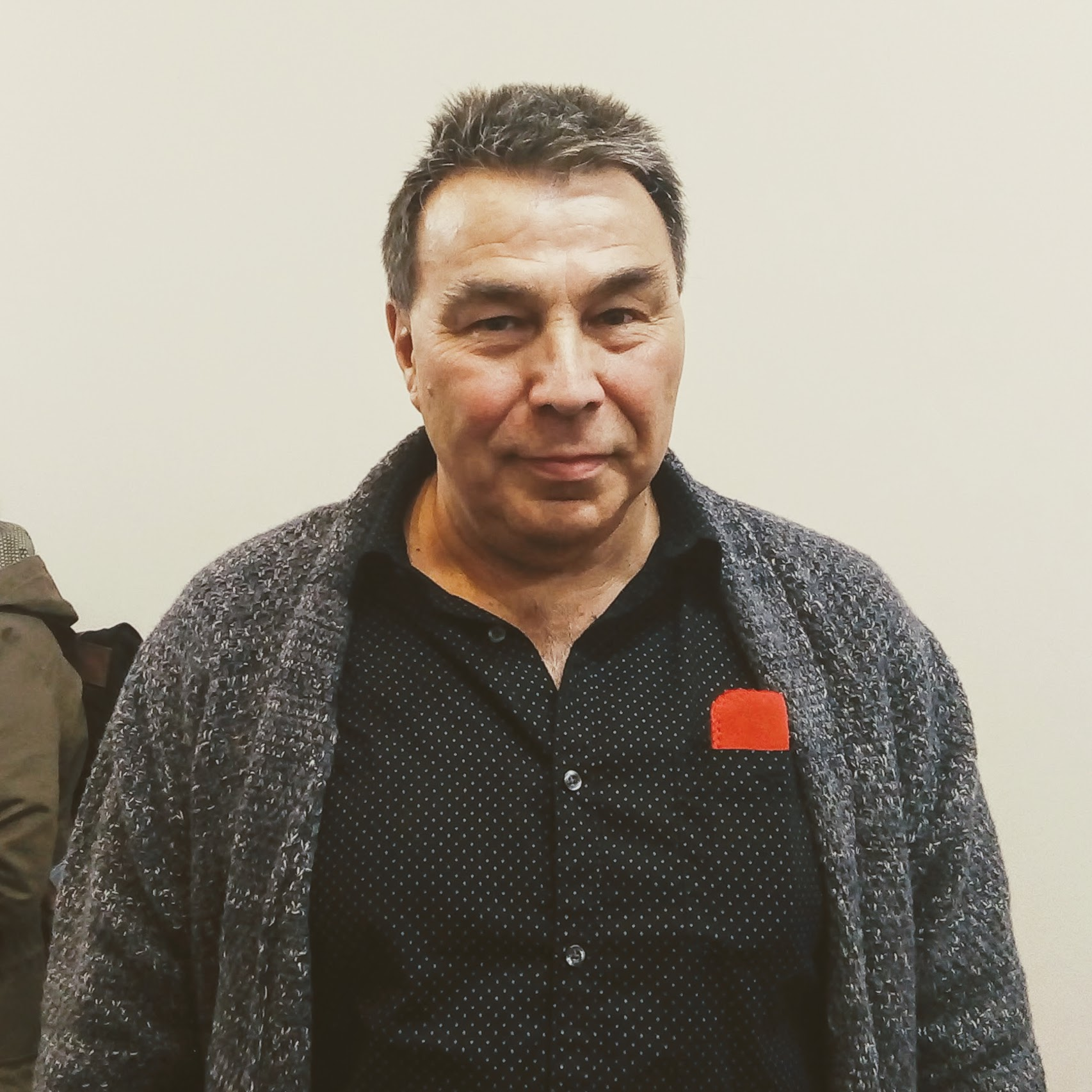
- Eric Goles Goles at O'Higgins University
- Born: Eric Antonio Goles Chacc; August 21, 1951 (age 74); Antofagasta, Chile

Eric Antonio Goles Chacc (born August 21, 1951, in Antofagasta, Chile) is a Chilean mathematician and computer scientist of Croatian descent. He studied mathematical engineering at the University of Chile before earning two doctorates from the University of Grenoble in France. His research focuses on discrete mathematics, theoretical computer science, complex systems, and cellular automata.

Goles is currently a full professor at Adolfo Ibáñez University in Chile, where he founded and directs a Ph.D. program in complex systems.

In 1993, Goles was awarded Chile's National Prize for Exact Sciences. He also served as President of CONICYT, the Chilean equivalent of the National Science Foundation in the U.S..
