= National Prize for Natural Sciences (Chile) =

- Part of the National Prize of Chile
- Sponsored by: CONICYT
- Country: Chile
- First award: 1992
- Currently held by: José Zagal Moya

The National Prize for Natural Sciences (Spanish: Premio Nacional de Ciencias Naturales) was created in 1992 as one of the replacements for the National Prize for Sciences under Law 19169. The other two prizes in this same area are for Exact Sciences and Applied Sciences and Technologies.

It is part of the National Prize of Chile.

== Winners ==
- 1992, Jorge Allende (biochemistry)
- 1994, Humberto Maturana (neurobiology)
- 1996, Nibaldo Bahamonde (hydrobiology)
- 1998, Juan Antonio Garbarino Bacigalupo (chemistry)
- 2000, Mario Luxoro (biophysics)
- 2002, Ramón Latorre (biophysics)
- 2004, Pedro Labarca Prado (biophysics)
- 2006, Cecilia Hidalgo Tapia (biochemistry)
- 2008, Nibaldo Inestrosa Cantin (neurobiology)
- 2010, Mary Kalin Arroyo (botany)
- 2012, Bernabé Santelices (marine biology)
- 2014, Ligia Gargallo (chemistry)
- 2016, Francisco Rothhammer Engel (genetics)
- 2018, Fabián Jaksic (ecology)
- 2020, Francisco Bozinovic (integrative biology)
- 2022, Sergio Lavandero (biochemistry)
- 2024, José Zagal Moya (electrochemistry)

== See also ==
- List of biology awards
- List of earth sciences awards
- List of chemistry awards
- List of medicine awards
- List of neuroscience awards
- List of psychology awards
- CONICYT
