= Ricardo Baeza =

Ricardo Baeza may refer to:

- Ricardo Baeza-Yates (born 1961), Chilean computer scientist
- Ricardo Baeza Rodríguez, Chilean mathematician
