= Soki (disambiguation) =

Soki is an ingredient of Okinawan cuisine.

Soki may also refer to:

- Sôki, a microcar battery electric vehicle produced in Chile
- I Ketut Soki (1946–2022), a Balinese artist
- Taniya Soki, an Indian politician
- Soki Yatagai (born 1998), a Japanese footballer
- Soki, the main character of Onimusha: Dawn of Dreams
