= Jeremy Knowles =

Jeremy Knowles is the name of:

- Jeremy R. Knowles (1935–2008), chemistry professor at Harvard University
- Jeremy Knowles (swimmer) (born 1981), Bahamian swimmer
