= National Prize for Exact Sciences (Chile) =

- For the scientist whose work in the respective field of knowledge makes him worthy of said distinction
- Sponsored by: Ministry of Education
- Country: Chile
- First award: 1992

The National Prize for Exact Sciences (Spanish: Premio Nacional de Ciencias Exactas) was created in 1992 as one of the replacements for the National Prize for Sciences under Law 19169. The other two prizes in this same area are for Natural Sciences and Applied Sciences and Technologies.

It is part of the National Prize of Chile.

== Jury ==
The jury is made up of the Minister of Education, who calls it, the Rector of the University of Chile, the President of the Chilean Academy of Sciences, a representative of the Council of Rectors, and the last recipient of the prize.

== Winners ==
- 1981, Igor Saavedra Gatica (physics)
- 1991, Enrique Tirapegui (physics)
- 1993, Servet Martínez and Eric Goles (mathematics)
- 1995, Claudio Bunster (physics)
- 1997, María Teresa Ruiz (astronomy)
- 1999, José Maza Sancho (astronomy)
- 2001, Fernando Lund Plantat (physics)
- 2003, Carlos Conca (mathematics)
- 2005, Rafael Benguria (physics)
- 2007, Miguel Kiwi (physics)
- 2009, Ricardo Baeza Rodríguez (mathematics)
- 2011, Patricio Felmer (mathematics)
- 2013, Manuel del Pino (mathematics)
- 2015, Mario Hamuy (astronomy)
- 2017, Guido Garay Brignardello (astronomy)
- 2019, Dora Altbir (nanoscience and nanotechnology)
- 2021, Mónica Rubio (astronomy)
- 2023, Jaime San Martín (mathematics)

== See also ==
- CONICYT
- List of astronomy awards
- List of computer science awards
- List of mathematics awards
- List of physics awards
