= National Prize for Sciences (Chile) =

- Part of the National Prize of Chile
- Sponsored by: CONICYT
- Country: Chile
- First award: 1969
- Final award: 1992

The National Prize for Sciences (Spanish: Premio Nacional de Ciencias) was an award that was part of the National Prize of Chile until 1992. It was created by law 16746, promulgated on 24 January 1968, and published in the Official Journal on 14 February of the same year. This made the National Commission for Scientific and Technological Research (CONICYT) an autonomous body with legal personhood.

This prize was granted to the Chilean scientist or team of scientists whose work in the field of pure or applied sciences was entitled to such distinction (per Article 2 of Law 16746). Initially it was granted annually, being modified by Law 17595 of 1972, which ordered that it would be given every two years.

In 1992, through Law 19169, it was replaced by the National Prizes for Exact Sciences, Natural Sciences, and Applied Sciences and Technologies.

== Winners ==
- 1969, Alejandro Lipschutz (biology)
- 1970, Herbert Appel (chemistry)
- 1971, Ricardo Donoso Novoa (history)
- 1973, Alfonso Asenjo Gómez (medicine)
- 1975, Joaquín Luco Valenzuela (biology)
- 1977, Jorge Mardones Restart (pharmacology)
- 1979, Héctor Croxatto (biology)
- 1981, Igor Saavedra Gatica (physics)
- 1983, Hermann Niemeyer (biochemistry)
- 1985, Luis Vargas Fernández (physiology)
- 1987, Danko Brncic (genetics)
- 1989, Gustavo Höeker Salas (immunology)
- 1991, Enrique Tirapegui Zurbano (physics)

== See also ==
- CONICYT
