= Conca =

Conca may refer to:

== Places ==
=== France ===
- Conca, Corse-du-Sud, a municipality of Corsica

=== Italy ===
- Conca (river), a river that flows into the Adriatic Sea
- Conca della Campania, a municipality of the Province of Caserta
- Conca Casale, a municipality of the Province of Isernia
- Mercatino Conca, a municipality of the Province of Pesaro and Urbino
- Conca dei Marini, a municipality of the Province of Salerno

=== Spain ===
- Conca de Dalt, a municipality of Catalonia

== Other uses ==
- Concerto for Strings ("Conca") in B-flat major, a composition by Antonio Vivaldi

== People with the surname ==
- Carlos Conca (born 1954), Chilean mathematician, engineer and scientist
- Darío Conca (1983 – ), Argentinian footballer
- Giovanni Conca, (c.1690–1771), Italian painter; see Santa Maria della Luce, Rome
- Giuseppe Conca (1904–1972), Italian Olympic weightlifter
- Reece Conca (born 1992), Australian rules footballer
- Sebastiano Conca (c.1680–1764), Italian painter
- Tommaso Conca (1734–1822), Italian baroque painter

== See also ==
- Conco, a town in the province of Vicenza, Veneto, Italy
