= Croxatto =

Croxatto is an Italian surname from Liguria, that derives from a word meaning “the Crusader”. Notable people with the surname include:

- Fernando Croxatto (born 1956), Argentine Roman Catholic bishop
- Héctor Croxatto (1908–2010), Chilean physiologist
