= Olga Grau =

Chilean writer, full professor and philosopher

Olga Ida Magdalena Grau Duhart
- Born: September 21, 1945 (age 81); Santiago, Chile
- Occupations: writer; full professor; philosopher

Academic background
- Education: University of Chile

Academic work
- Institutions: University of Chile
- Main interests: gender; sexuality; philosophy; education; literature

Olga Ida Magdalena Grau Duhart (born September 21, 1945) is a contemporary Chilean writer, full professor, and philosopher, a specialist in gender, sexuality, philosophy, education, and literature.

== Early life and education ==
Olga Ida Magdalena Grau Duhart was born in Santiago, Chile, September 21, 1945. She has a Diploma in childhood studies from Montclair State University, in Montclair, New Jersey, U.S., and a Doctorate in Literature with a specialization in Chilean and Hispanic literature from the University of Chile.

== Career and research ==
Grau was awarded a FONDECYT project in 1993, for "Discurso, Género y Poder: Un Análisis de Discursos Públicos Oficiales en Chile (1978-1993)" (Discourse, Gender and Power: An Analysis of Official Public Discourses in Chile (1978-1993)) and in 1995, for "El Relato Mítico de la Quintrala en el Imaginario Cultural" (The Mythical Story of the Quintrala in the Cultural Imaginary). In 2010, she was awarded another FONDECYT project entitled: "Filosofía, Literatura y Género: La Escritura de Simone de Beauvoir" (Philosophy, Literature and Gender: The Writing of Simone de Beauvoir).

She works as a full professor at the Faculty of Philosophy and Humanities and at the "Centro de Estudios de Género y Cultura en América Latina" (CEGECAL) (Center for Gender and Cultural Studies in Latin America) at the University of Chile. She is also coordinator of the Philosophy for Children program and director of the " Comunidad de Indagación en Filosofía e Infancia en Chile" (CIFICH) (Community of Inquiry in Philosophy and Childhood in Chile). Grau has written books and essays, and made presentations on gender, sexuality, philosophy, childhood, education and literature.

== Awards and honours ==
In 1999, she received an award from the Book Council in the category “unpublished essay” for her text "Catalina, Catrala, Quintrala. Tres nombres y una persona no más" (Catalina, Catrala, Quintrala. Three names and just one person).

== Selected works ==
=== Books ===
- Cosas y palabras: manual de filosofía para educadores de párvulos (1995)
- Filosofía para la infancia: relatos y desarrollo de actividades (2006)
- Ser y convivir: propuesta pedagógica para el desarrollo personal y la convivencia social de niños y niñas (2000)

=== Essays ===
- "La Ambigua Escritura de Simone de Beauvoir" (2013)
- "La Escritura de Simone de Beauvoir como Proyecto Global" (2014)
