= Dora Altbir =

Chilean physicist

- Born: 21 February 1961 (age 65)
- Education: Pontifical Catholic University of Chile; University of Santiago, Chile
- Known for: Theoretical study of magnetic nanostructures
- Scientific career
- Institutions: Center for the Development of Nanoscience and Nanotechnology; Dirección de Investigación Científica y Tecnológica

Dora Altbir (born 21 February 1961) is a Chilean physicist in the field of nanoscience and nanotechnology. She was awarded the National Prize for Exact Sciences (Chile) in 2019 for her work in the theoretical study of magnetic nanostructures. She is currently a professor at the University of Santiago, Chile.

Altbir is director of the Center for the Development of Nanoscience and Nanotechnology and director of the Dirección de Investigación Científica y Tecnológica at the University of Santiago, Chile. She is a corresponding member of the Chilean Academy of Sciences.
