= Athel Cornish-Bowden =

British biochemist

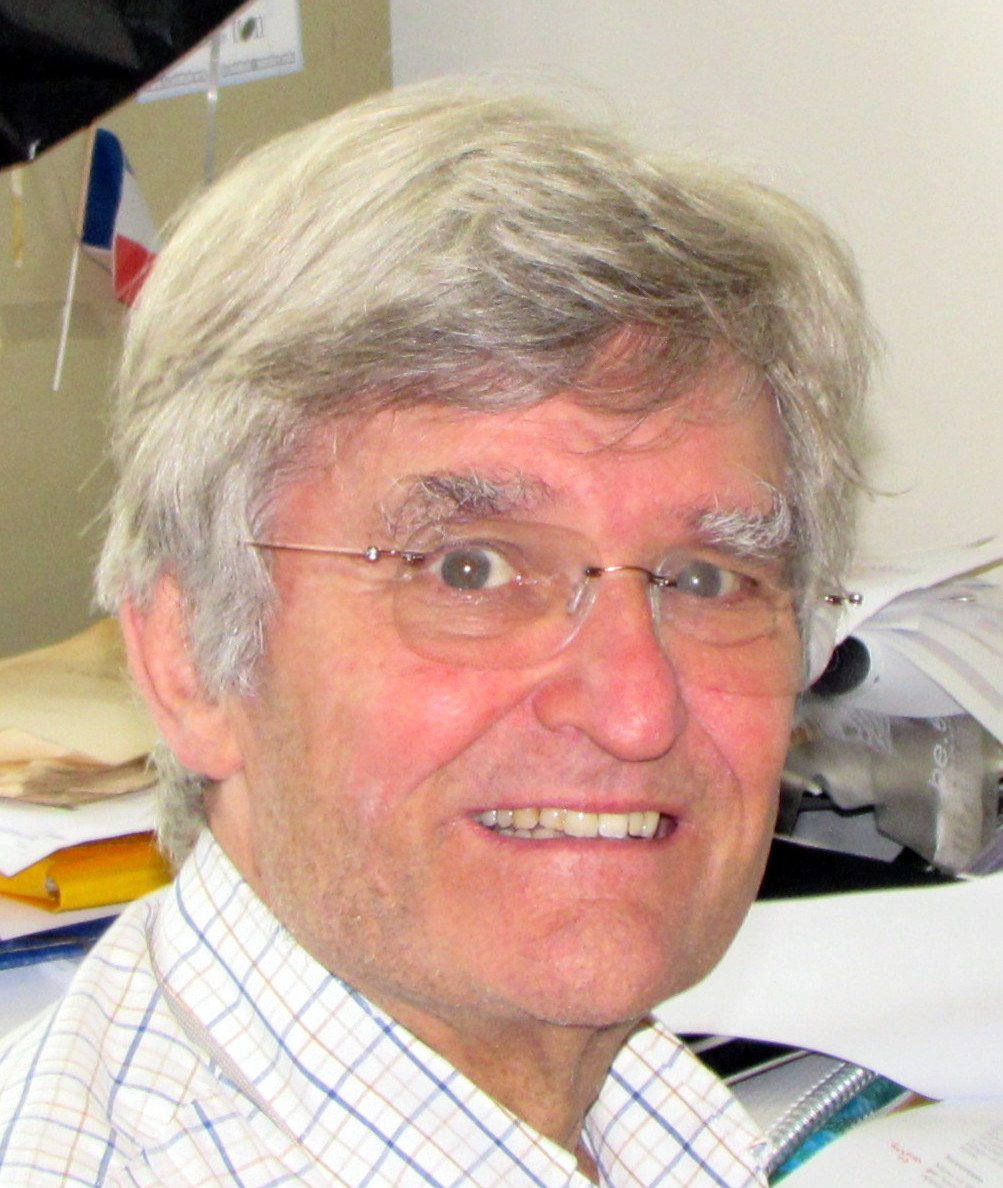
- Cornish-Bowden in 2014
- Born: Athelstan John Cornish-Bowden; 3 April 1943 (age 83); Ashburton, England
- Education: Oxford University
- Known for: Enzyme Kinetics, Metabolic Control Analysis
- Spouse(s): Mary Ann Reynolds, María de la Luz Cárdenas Cerda
- Scientific career
- Fields: Biochemistry, theoretical biology
- Workplaces: University of California, Berkeley, University of Birmingham, CNRS, Marseilles
- Thesis: Studies of Pepsin catalysis (1967)
- Doctoral advisor: Jeremy R. Knowles
- Other academic advisors: Daniel E. Koshland Jr.

Signature
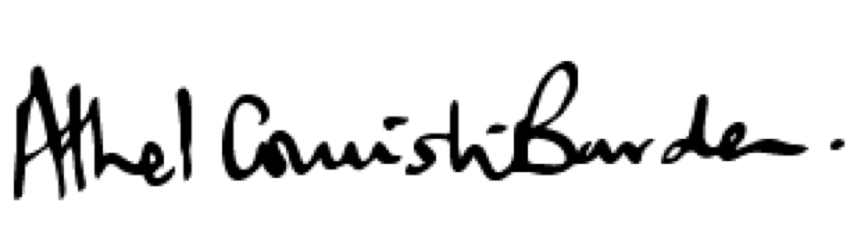

Athel Cornish-Bowden (born 3 April 1943) is a British biochemist known for writing textbooks, particularly those on enzyme kinetics and his work on metabolic control analysis.

== Education and career ==
Cornish-Bowden has worked on pepsin catalysis, and has researched enzyme catalysis, and in later years worked on the control of metabolism. More recently he has researched the origin and nature of life.

He received a D.Phil. from Oxford with Jeremy R. Knowles, followed by post-doctoral work at Berkeley with Daniel E. Koshland Jr.

== Research ==
Cornish-Bowden has authored over 200 peer-reviewed papers and nine textbooks on topics related to enzyme kinetics, mathematics and historical perspectives in science.

Cornish-Bowden's research can be divided into three primary areas: Enzyme kinetics, metabolic control, done mainly in collaboration with Jannie Hofmeyr, and the origin of life. The following lists some of the topics and selected references to the work carried out and published by Cornish-Bowden:

- Mechanisms of Pepsin Catalysis
- Binding of ligands to Proteins
- Kinetics of nitrite reductase
- Kinetics of nitrate reductase
- The evolution of macromolecules
- Properties of multienzyme systems
- The theory of self-organizing systems

Cornish-Bowden has published a number of history of science papers commemorating the lives and achievements of historical figures in enzymology. His current interests include the definition of life and the capacity for life to self-organize.

=== Research contributions ===
Cornish-Bowden introduced the direct linear plot procedure for estimating enzyme parameters, and has performed work on hexokinase evolution and kinetics, and the control and regulation of metabolism.

== Editorial and related work ==
Cornish-Bowden has participated on the editorial boards of various journals (the Biochemical Journal, the Journal of Theoretical Biology, FEBS Journal, BioSystems), and has been active on International Committees. He was secretary (and later chair) of the IUPAC-IUBMB Joint Committee on Biochemical Nomenclature and in that capacity convened the committee that prepared the current IUBMB recommendations on enzyme kinetics. He also contributed to recommendations on biochemical thermodynamics, and to proposals for system representation of biochemical networks.

== Books ==
- Cornish-Bowden, Athel (1976). Principles of Enzyme Kinetics. London: Butterworths. ISBN 0408707216.
- Cornish-Bowden, Athel (2012). Fundamentals of Enzyme Kinetics (4 ed.). Weinheim: Wiley-Blackwell. ISBN 9783527330744.
- Cornish-Bowden, Athel (1996). Analysis of Enzyme Kinetic Data. London: Oxford University Press. ISBN 0-19-854877-X.
- Cornish-Bowden, Athel (1999). Basic Mathematics for Biochemists (2 ed.). Oxford and New York: Oxford University Press. ISBN 0-19-854877-X.
- Cornish-Bowden, Athel (2016). Biochemical Evolution: the Pursuit of Perfection (2 ed.). Garland Science. ISBN 978-0-8153-4552-7.
