= Science and technology in Chile =

Science and Technology in Chile is led by the National Commission of Scientific and Technological Investigation.

== History ==
The study of physics in Chile traces to the chairs of experimental physics funded by Juan Martínez de Rozas between 1781 and 1783 in the Convictorio Carolino.

When the Chilean National Institute began teaching on 10 August 1813, one of the institute's eighteen chairs was for experimental physics. This was dictated by presbyter José Alejo Bezanilla and taught as part of the course of Natural Sciences. After the Disaster of Rancagua, General Mariano Osorio assumed control of the country, abolishing the republican initiatives decreed by José Miguel Carrera and Bernardo O'Higgins, and restoring the colony's governmental, administrative and judicial institutions. These initiatives affected the National Institute.

One of the first scientists who spoke on the development of science in Chile was Jesuit priest Juan Ignacio Molina.

== Chilean Technology ==
In the field of biotechnology, Pablo Valenzuela contributed to the creation of the vaccine, the discovery of the Hepatitis C virus, and the development of a process to produce human insulin from yeast. Under his direction, scientists cloned and sequenced HIV.

Another notable Chilean technology is the Sôki, an electric vehicle.

Chile was ranked 51st in the Global Innovation Index in 2025.

== Overview of Science and Technology Policy, 2015–2019 ==
=== A Focus on Building Better Times. ===
Chile registered economic growth of 3.9% in 2018, improving on its average growth rate of 1.8% over the 2015–2017 period. This upturn may be linked to the dynamism shown by exports of goods and services, as well as private consumption. The upturn has been short-lived, however, as growth has since been affected by social unrest and the COVID-19 crisis.

Research intensity dipped slightly over the 2013–2018 period, even as the researcher population surged by 55%, suggesting that the amount of funding available to each researcher has dropped. Publication intensity grew by 25% between 2015 and 2019, a drop from the 35% growth achieved over the period 2011–2015.

Chile's national development plan for 2018–2022, Let's Build Better Times for Chile, recognizes the importance of building an innovative and entrepreneurial culture based on the use of new technologies to enable Chile to play an active role in the Fourth Industrial Revolution. In 2016, Chile established the National Council for the Implementation of The 2030 Agenda for Sustainable Development. Led by the Ministry of Foreign Affairs, the council serves as a coordinating and monitoring body, as well as an advisory body to the president; it has created several working groups.

=== CONICYT Replaced In Far-reaching Reform ===
In 2018, the National Commission for Scientific and Technological Research (CONICYT) was broken down, by law, into two new entities, the Ministry of Science, Technology, Knowledge, and Innovation and the National Agency for Research and Development (ANID). The ministry became operational in October 2019 and is responsible for policymaking and coordination. Its main function is to advise the presidency on the preparation, implementation, and monitoring of national policies.

Policy implementation itself falls to ANID, the new decentralized agency. It is attached to the Ministry of Science, Technology, Knowledge and Innovation but has a legal personality of its own and enjoys financial and administrative autonomy. It implements two long-standing programmes, the National Fund for Scientific and Technological Development (FONDECYT) and the Fund for the Promotion of Scientific and Technological Development (FONDEF). It has also inherited Chile's astronomy programme, which used to be implemented by CONICYT.

Despite this reform, Chile has not abandoned the model of having twin agencies. These have complementary functions. Whereas ANID specializes in support for science-based innovation and entrepreneurship, the second agency, the Corporation for the Promotion of Production (CORFO), is attached to the Ministry of the Economy and specializes in supporting non-science-based innovation and entrepreneurship. Those of its programmes supporting science and technology have been transferred to ANID.

Having two parallel innovation agencies makes coordination a challenge. A ministerial committee was set up by the aforementioned law of 2018 to coordinate the work of ministries but it has met infrequently, up to now.

The aforementioned law also renamed the National Innovation Council for Development, which is now called the National Science, Technology, Knowledge and Innovation Council for Development, and gave it a more consequential role as the advisory body to the presidency on national strategy.

Over the years, CORFO has implemented numerous sectoral programmes, which are distinct from the mission oriented sectoral funds put in place by Argentina, Brazil, Mexico and others. Since 2015, CORFO has focused on enhancing the competitiveness of a particular sector by improving co-ordination between public and private agents.

In 2018, CORFO funded six national programmes for creative industries, sustainable construction, healthy foods, logistics for exports, mining, and the solar energy industry. It also funded three ecoregional and 16 regional programmes.

Together with the Ministry of Social Development and Family, CORFO launched the Indigenous Development and Promotion Programme in 2017. It is oriented towards entrepreneurship, providing indigenous groups with state grants to help them fund their business projects. To qualify these projects must be economically and socio-culturally sustainable and address one of the designated priority sectors: agriculture, forestry, and aquaculture; sources of renewable energy such as solar and wind power; or tourism.

== Institutions ==
- Ministry of Science, Technology, Knowledge and Innovation
- Chilean Academy of Sciences
- Centre of Astrophysics and Affine Technologies
- Centre of Scientific Studies
- Museum of Science and Technology
- Museum of Natural History of Valparaíso
- Interactive museum Oriel
- National Museum of Natural History

== Events ==
- Congress of the Future
- National Scientific Fair Juvenile

== Sources ==
This article incorporates text from a free content work. Licensed under CC BY-SA 3.0 IGO. Text taken from UNESCO Science Report: the Race Against Time for Smarter Development, UNESCO Publishing.
