= Ligia Gargallo =

Peruvian-Chilean researcher

Ligia Gargallo González is a Chilean chemist and university professor of the Pontifical Catholic University of Chile.

== Career ==
She works at the University of Tarapacá (Arica) and at the Pontifical Catholic University of Chile, in Santiago. She received a bachelor's degree in chemical pharmaceutical at the University of Chile in 1959, degrees in chemistry from Paris Dauphine University and Katholieke Universiteit Leuven, a doctorate in chemical sciences at the University of Liège in Belgium in 1972, and a doctorate in chemistry from Katholieke Universiteit Leuven. Her areas of investigation are focused in Polymers and Macromolecules. Her work has aided drug designers. She is the winner of the Prize L'Oréal-UNESCO to Women in Science 2007 and Chile's National Prize for Natural Sciences in 2014 because of the "pioneering work in the development of the chemistry of polymers and macromolecules".

== Publications ==
- chemical-Physical of Macromolecules in the interface air-water, Macromolecules. Spanish Academic publisher (2012-01-27)
- 265 publications until the 2014.

== Prizes ==
- 2007, Prize L'Oréal UNESCO to Women in Science
- 2014, National Prize of Natural Sciences of Chile
