= Hermann Niemeyer =

Chilean scientist (1918–1991)

- Born: Hermann Niemeyer Fernández; 26 October 1918; Ovalle, Chile
- Died: 7 June 1991 (aged 72); Santiago, Chile
- Education: Universidad de Chile
- Known for: Investigation of hexokinases; carbohydrate metabolism
- Relatives: Hans Niemeyer (brother)
- Awards: National Science Prize of Chile (1983)
- Scientific career
- Fields: Biochemistry
- Workplaces: Harvard University; University of Wisconsin; Universidad de Chile
- Thesis: Contribución al estudio del metabolismo de la célula hepática (1943)
- Doctoral students: Tito Ureta, María Luz Cárdenas

Hermann Niemeyer Fernández (26 October 1918 – 7 June 1991) was a Chilean scientist who did much to establish biochemistry as a research discipline in Chile. In 1983 he received the National Science Prize for his major advances in biochemistry in the fields of bioenergetics, metabolic regulation of enzymes, and studies of metabolism in liver cells.

== Life and career ==
=== Education ===
Hermann Niemeyer was born in Ovalle, Chile, where his father was the German consul. His secondary education was at the Internado Nacional Barros Arana in Santiago, where he joined an exceptional group of young people, including Jorge Millas [es], Nicanor Parra (brother of Violeta Parra) and Luis Oyarzún. Membership of this group, illustrated at a web page about Nicanor Parra that has a photograph that includes Niemeyer as a young man (easily recognizable to those who knew him as an old man), marked Niemeyer's character: his preference for frank and rigorous discussion; his humanism; his liking of music and painting; and his strictly republican politics.

In 1943 he obtained the title of Doctor of Surgery for his thesis Contribución al estudio del metabolismo de la célula hepática (Contribution to the study of metabolism in the liver cell).

=== Postgraduate research ===
For a few years Niemeyer worked in paediatrics, and moved later to biochemistry. From 1944 until 1953 he published a series of reports on malnutrition, some of them drawing on his biochemical experience, written with Julio Meneghello Rivera. In the same period he published more strictly biochemical work with Eduardo Cruz-Coke.

In 1949 Niemeyer obtained a Guggenheim research fellowship to work in the Department of Biochemistry at Harvard. There he dedicated himself exclusively to research rather than paediatrics. He returned to the USA in 1957 to work at the University of Wisconsin at Madison, where he worked with Van Rensselaer Potter.

=== Career ===
In his later years Niemeyer was Professor of Biochemistry of the University of Chile, with his research group in the Faculty of Sciences, where he worked on enzymes of liver metabolism, especially liver hexokinase. He was the first to report that this enzyme, monomeric in structure, displayed sigmoidal kinetics with respect to its substrate, glucose, a property previously thought to require multiple subunits.

In 1988 he was one of the founders of the political movement Independents for a Democratic Consensus.

An account of Niemeyer's career has been given by the Spanish Society for Biochemistry and Molecular Biology (SEBBM).

=== Personal life ===
Hermann Niemeyer married María Marich ("Maruja") and had two daughters and a son. He died in Santiago, Chile, on 7 June 1991

== Prizes and distinctions ==
In 1952 he and Julio Meneghello were awarded the Nestlé Prize for their work on infantile malnutrition. In 1962 he earned the Atenea Award for his textbook Bioquímica General (General Biochemistry). The Academy of Sciences of the Instituto de Chile elected him as full member in 1971, assigning seat N° 9 to him. The Argentinian Society for Biochemical Research (SAIB: Sociedad Argentina de Investigaciones Bioquímicas) made him an Honorary Member in 1972, and in 1981 he received the corresponding status of the Chilean Society of Biology (Sociedad de Biología de Chile) and of the Chilean Society of Biochemistry (Sociedad de Bioquímica de Chile). In 1983 he was awarded the National Science Prize. Towards the end of his life, in 1990, the University of Chile awarded him the Medalla Juvenal Hernández Jaque. The Spanish Society of Biochemistry and Molecular Biology (SEBBM) has an annual lecture to commemorate Hermann Niemeyer.
