= Mabel Condemarín =

Chilean educator

Mabel Condemarín (November 3, 1931 – March 30, 2004) was a Chilean educator.

== Biography ==
Mabel Condemarín carried out her primary studies at the St. Mary of Iquique school, later studying at the José Abelardo Núñez Normal School and subsequently La Serena Superior Normal School.

Specialising in teaching reading, she authored numerous publications in this area, several of them in partnership with her husband, the teacher Felipe Alliende. She eventually became an academic of the Pontifical Catholic University of Chile. In January 1990 she became part of the Ministry of Education, and was placed in charge of the program of language for 900 schools with low academic performance (P-900.)

In recognition of her efforts in propagating new teaching methods for reading throughout Latin America, a number of schools named themselves after her, one in Peru and another in Colombia. The Technical Lyceum of Chillán also takes its name from her at present. In 2003 the National Prize for Education Sciences was conferred upon her.

She died in Santiago on 30 March 2004, after a short and unexpected illness.

== Publications ==
School Texts

- Ene-tene tu: apresto para la lectura, Felipe Alliiytyende, Mabel Condemarín (Zig Zag, 1982, 11ª edición)
- Dame la mano: lectura y lenguaje 1° básico Felipe Alliende, Mabel Condemarín, Mariana Chadwick (Zig Zag, 1983)
- Comprensión de la lectura 2: fichas de lectura para ninõs de 10 a 12 años, Felipe Alliende, Mabel Condemarín, Mariana Chadwick y Neva Milicic (Galdoc, 1982, 1ª edición; Andrés Bello 2001, 16ª edición)
- Comprensión de la lectura 3: fichas para el desarrollo de la comprensión de la lectura, destinadas a adolescentes, Felipe Alliende, Mabel Condemarín, Mariana Chadwick y Neva Milicic (Andrés Bello, 1996, 9ª edición)

Academic Texts

- La dislexia. Manual de lectura correctiva, Mabel Condemarín y Marlys Blomquist (Editorial Universitaria, 1970)
- La lectura: teoría, evaluación y desarrollo, Felipe Alliende y Mabel Condemarín (Andrés Bello, 1986)
- La escritura creativa y formal, Mabel Condemarín y Mariana Chadwick (Andrés Bello 1988)
- De la asignatura de Castellano al área del lenguaje, Felipe Alliende y Mabel Condemarín (Dolmen Ediciones, 1997)
- Comprensión de la lectura, Felipe Alliende, Mariana Chadwick y Mabel Condemarín (Andrés Bello, 1998)
- Las Fuerzas Armadas y Carabineros de Chile: Su Regulación Constitucional y Orgánica Constitucional Mario Duvauchelle Rodríguez, Felipe Alliende, Mariana Chadwick, Mabel Condemarín (Editorial Jurídica de Chile, 2001)
- Madurez Escolar, Mabel Condemarin, Mariana Chadwick, Neva Milicic (Editorial Andres Bello, 1995, 7a. edicion)

Books for Children

- La gallinita roja y el grano de trigo, (4 cuentos) recopilación y adaptación de Cecilia Beauchat y Mabel Condemarín (Andrés Bello, 1985)
- El lobo y el zorro y otros cuentos, Cecilia Beauchat y Mabel Condemarín (1990)
- Juguemos a leer, Mabel Condemarín (Salo, 1990)
- Caracol, caracol, saca tu librito al sol, Cecilia Beauchat y Mabel Condemarín (Editorial Universitaria, 1991, antología)
- Trompitas el elefante, Cecilia Beauchat y Mabel Condemarín (Dolmen, 1993)
