= Ernesto Livacic =

Ernesto Andrés Livacic Gazzano (March 23, 1929 – May 29, 2007) was a prominent Chilean academic and author who published more than 50 books on literature and on the field of education.

Livacic was born in the southern Chilean city of Punta Arenas to a family of Croatian origin. He earned a Master of Education degree and worked for 14 years as a teacher in a number of secondary educational institutions in Chile. In 1961 he became a professor at the University of Chile, and in 1962 he also became an educational authority and planner for UNESCO.

Livacic worked for the Chilean Ministry of Education for 8 years as technical secretary of the Superintendency of Education (1965–1969); he later served as Sub Secretary of Education (1969–1970). He was also a distinguished member of the National Council of Education in Chile from 1965 to 1973.

Since 1983 he was a principal member of the Chilean Academy of Language, where he served as secretary (1983–1999), vice-director (1995–1998) and the president of the Commission for Literature (1999–2005).

He was an academic in the Catholic University of Chile from 1955 to 1994 where he held the post of Director of the Institute of Letters for four years. In 1995, the Catholic University of Chile distinguished him as Professor Emeritus of the Faculty of Literature.

In 1993, he was awarded the National Prize for Education Sciences and was a member of Chile's Educational Curriculum Association since 1993 and honorary member of the Chilean Society of the History of Education since 1994.

Livacic was also president of the directors council of the Metropolitan University of Educational Sciences (1990–1992), a distinguished member of the directors council of the University of Magallanes (1993–1999) and he was on the superior council of the Universidad de las Américas (Chile) (1989–2004).

He was also a corresponding member of the Croatian Academy of Sciences and Arts and he was awarded an honorary doctorate by the University of Magallanes in 1999.

Livacic published more than 50 books and hundreds of articles on the field of education and literature, and some of his works were translated into numerous languages.
