= James Kadonaga =

American biologist

James T. Kadonaga is an American biologist, currently the Amylin Endowed Chair in Lifesciences at University of California, San Diego.

== Education ==
Kadonga has a bachelor's degree in chemistry in 1980 from MIT, where he received the Alpha Chi Sigma Prize and the American Institute of Chemists Certificate. His then completed his A.M. and Ph.D. degrees in chemistry at Harvard University (1982, 1984) under Jeremy R. Knowles. He was a DuPont Fellow.

Following his graduate studies, Kadonaga joined Robert Tjian’s lab at Berkeley (1984-1988) as a postdoc, where he developed sequence-specific DNA affinity chromatography and helped purify transcription factors such as Sp1. Kadonaga joined the faculty at the University of California, San Diego.

Kadonaga’s laboratory has made major contributions to understanding how RNA polymerase II transcription is regulated in the context of chromatin. His work has included the purification and analysis of promoter- and enhancer-binding factors; early demonstrations that activators counteract chromatin-mediated transcription repression; and the elucidation of the enzymatic machinery that assembles chromatin, leading to the discovery of ACF and ASF1 chromatin assembly factors, as well as the prenucleosome intermediate. His group also discovered NDF, a nucleosome destabilizing factor that enhances transcriptional elongation, and identified annealing helicases, ATP-driven enzymes that catalyze the rewinding of complementary DNA strands. In addition, his lab has defined new core promoter elements beyond the classic TATA box, including the DPE, MTE, and TCT motifs, and revealed their roles in transcriptional networks such as Hox genes and translation.

Kadonaga continues to explore the mechanisms behind gene regulation. He says, “we don’t know what’s around the next corner” and continues to train generations of scientists in transcription and chromatin biology.

== Awards ==
- 2022 Elected Member, National Academy of Sciences
- 2017 Elected Member, American Academy of Arts and Sciences
- 1995 Elected Member, American Academy of Microbiology
- 1994 Elected Member, American Association for the Advancement of Science
- 1992 Presidential Faculty Fellow Award, National Science Foundation
