= Ramón Latorre =

Chilean biochemist (born 1941)

Ramon Latorre de la Cruz
- Born: October 29, 1941 (age 84); Santiago, Chile
- Education: University of Chile
- Known for: Investigations in the field of the ionic channels of cell membranes
- Awards: National Prize for Natural Sciences of Chile (2002)
- Scientific career
- Fields: Biochemistry
- Workplaces: Institute Millennium Interdisciplinary Center of Neurosciences; University of Valparaíso

Ramón Rogelio Latorre de la Cruz (born October 29, 1941) is a Chilean biochemist, The winner of Chile's National Prize for Natural Sciences in 2002, he has been recognized for his investigations in the field of the ionic channels of cellular membranes.

== Biography ==
He studied secondary in the Chilean School Jose Victorino Lastarria. In 1965 he received a biochemist at the School of Chemistry and Pharmacy. In 1969 he received a doctorate in Sciences with a Doctorate in Biology at the University of Chile, being one of the first students of that degree. He later received a scholarship from the National Institute of Health de EE.UU., and finished work in his laboratory of biophysics of this institution until the year 1972. Returned to Chile and held the position in the Faculty of Sciences of assistant professor. After 1973 Chilean coup d'état, Returned to the EE.UU. and served in the Department of Physiology at Duke University as a visiting scientist. Two years later he worked in the Department of Physiological and Pharmacological Sciences of the University of Chicago as an assistant professor and in 1977 he began to perform his teaching task at the School of Medicine of the University of Harvard.

Returning to his country (Chile), in 1983 he worked in the Faculty of Sciences of the University of Chile as professor of Cellular Physiology. The following year he founded with the physicist Claudio Teitelboim the Center for Scientific Studies of Santiago, Who later moved to Valdivia.
