= Carlos Conca =

Chilean mathematician and engineer

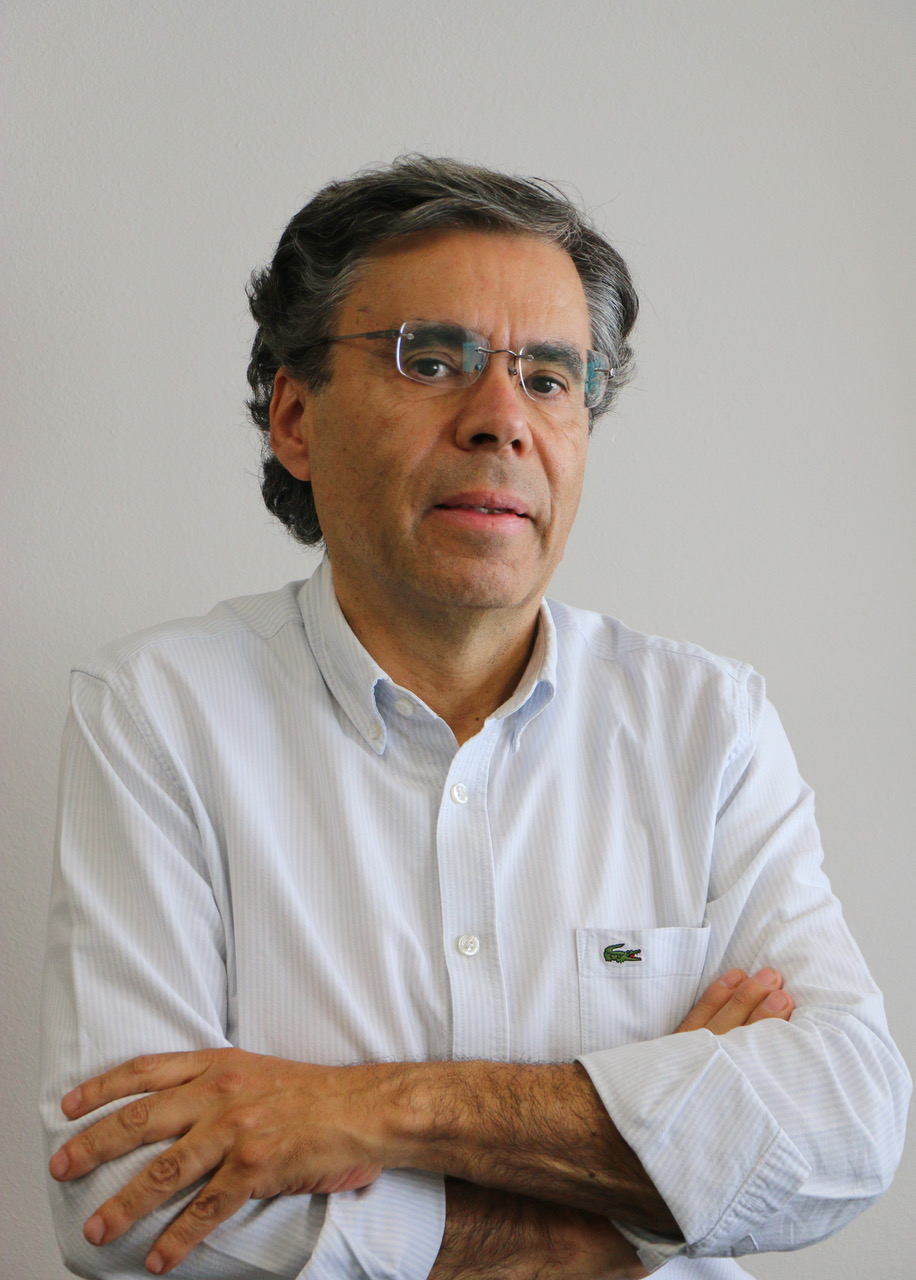

Carlos Conca (Santiago, Chile, November 4, 1954; his second family name is Rosende) is a Chilean mathematical engineer and the former director of the Department of Mathematical Engineering (DIM) at the University of Chile, serving in this role between 1988 and 1991. Additionally, at this university, he co-founded the Centre for Mathematical Modelling (CMM) in 2000, the Millennium Institute for Cell Dynamics and Biotechnology (ICDB) in 2006, and the Centre of Excellence in Biotechnology and Bioengineering (CeBiB) in 2014. He was the director of the Computing Center (CEC) in 1988.

He was awarded with the Premio Nacional de Ciencias Exactas de Chile in 2004.

== Early life ==
He was born into a family of Sardinian immigrants. He completed his primary and secondary education at Saint Gabriel English School in Santiago and studied at the Faculty of Physical and Mathematical Sciences at the University of Chile, where he earned a degree in mathematical civil engineering in 1977. That same year, he began his academic career as an instructor at the Department of Mathematical Engineering (DIM), focusing on applied mathematics. In 1982, he received the degree of Docteur Ingénieur from the Jacques-Louis Lions Laboratory (LJLL) at the Université Pierre et Marie Curie (UPMC). He subsequently obtained a position as chargé de recherches at the French National Centre for Scientific Research (CNRS) through a public competition. In 1987, he earned the degree of Docteur d'État in Mathematical Sciences from UPMC with a thesis titled Homogénéisation de Quelques Problèmes aux Limites en Mécanique des Fluides, co-supervised by Jean-Pierre Puel and François Murat.

== Career ==
In October 1987, he returned to Chile as an assistant professor at the DIM, and was promoted to full professor at the age of 36 in 1989. He drove the modernization of applied mathematics education in his designing and co-founding by creating the doctoral program in engineering sciences, with a focus on mathematical modelling, and the master's program in engineering sciences, with a focus on applied mathematics.

In 1996, the Chilean government launched the FONDAP funding program for applied mathematics. From the beginning, he played a central role in this initiative, leading the mechanics-mathematics team. He later co-founded the CMM in 2000, and consequently, new research groups in various applied areas (environment, inverse problems in climatology and oceanography, numerical simulation in copper smelting and conversion, mathematical models in physiology).

In 2001, he led the creation of the doctoral program in engineering sciences, with a focus on fluid dynamics, at the University of Chile. He also co-founded the Millennium Institute for Cell Dynamics and Biotechnology (ICDB) in 2006 and the Center of Excellence in Biotechnology and Bioengineering (CeBiB) in 2014. He has also led several cooperative projects with companies like Codelco Inc. and JRI Ingeniería. For 6 years (2004–2010), he was the principal investigator on a project from the Chilean Ministry of Education.

== Research ==
=== Analysis of heterogeneous materials (mathematical homogenization theory). ===
His research has focused on the mathematical analysis of heterogeneous materials, particularly within the framework of homogenization theory. In his French docteur d'État thesis, he applied families of functions of the form eiξ⋅xϕ(x), combining a plane wave with a periodic function, commonly known as Bloch waves, to the homogenization of a mathematical model describing solid–fluid interaction. In subsequent collaborative work, he further developed the use of Bloch waves in a range of partial differential equation models. This work contributed to the development of the Bloch method in homogenization theory, a Fourier-type dual approach relative to standard strategies for the analysis of elliptic operators with highly oscillatory coefficients.

=== Stokes and Navier-Stokes systems ===
In a chapter of his thèse d'État, he proved existence and uniqueness results for incompressible Stokes and Navier-Stokes evolution systems with non-standard boundary conditions, particularly, conditions on pressure and Cauchy stresses. These results were originally published in French, as a chapter in the book "Nonlinear Partial Differential Equations and their Applications", Vol. IX, H. Brézis & J.-L. Lions eds., Longman Scientific & Technical, Harlow (1988); a seminal paper according to Google AI, and later translated into English. The most relevant mathematical results obtained generalise the classic theorems of J. Leray, O. Ladyzhenskaya, and J.-L. Lions, to the case where the classical "gradient-gradient" bilinear form is replaced by the "curl-curl" form in the variational formulation.

=== Theoretical and numerical aspects of fluid-solid type structures ===
Beginning in the early 1980s, he collaborated with Électricité de France (EDF) on the mathematical study of structures such as tubular condensers and heat exchangers used in nuclear power plants. Using homogenization-based models, he developed results on the localization and distribution of stable and unstable modes that provided a theoretical explanation for a mechanically induced resonance phenomenon observed in steam condensers. For this work, the University of Metz awarded him the title of Doctor Honoris Causa in 1998.

He later worked with collaborators including J. San Martín and M. Tucsnak on the motion of a rigid body in a viscous fluid. For nonlinear coupling, they established weak well-posedness, showing that either global solutions exist or the body eventually collides with the container boundary.

=== Calculus of variations and optimal design ===
His work in calculus of variations addresses a problem posed by F. Murat and L. Tartar on how to distribute two homogeneous materials, in fixed proportions, within a region Ω⊂RN to minimize a mechanical criterion, such as the first eigenvalue of the resulting medium. The problem is associated with the conjectured existence of a classical optimal configuration that does not rely on homogenized mixtures or composite microstructures. This research was carried out in collaboration with teams in France and Chile.

=== Inverse problems and applications ===
He has also worked on inverse problems, a field originating with A. P. Calderón's work on determining electrical conductivity from Dirichlet-to-Neumann data. His research initially focused on geometric inverse problems, including the recovery of information about an unknown rigid body immersed in a fluid within a bounded region. He later extended these results to moving inclusions and fluid–structure interaction. He also applied inverse modeling to biological systems, proposing mathematical methods, with Rodrigo Lecaros, to determine the spatial distribution of ion channels in olfactory neurons from measured electrical activity.

=== Technological Innovation ===
In collaboration with John MacKinnon and electrical engineers N. Beltrán (1947-2014), M. Duarte, R. Maureira & V. Johnson, he built a portable, handheld ultrasound device with logic control and data processing, named TAOTE.

== Awards ==
- 2003 National Prize for Exact Sciences (mathematics, physics).
- Doctor Honoris Causa, University of Metz, France (1998).
- Presidential Chair in Mathematical Sciences (1996), in the field of partial differential equations. The recognition was awarded based on the verdict of an international jury composed of professors R. Marcus (Pasadena, President; Nobel Prize in Chemistry in 1990), D. Gross (Princeton), C. Milstein (Cambridge, U.K.), E. Neher (Göttingen), and P. Cartier (Paris).
- Corresponding Member (2002) and Full Member (since 2012) of the Academia Chilena de Ciencias, Instituto de Chile.
- 2016 Ramón Salas Edwards Award in Technology & Innovation. A national recognition, awarded by the Instituto de Ingenieros de Chile, for the best technological innovation in the Chilean or foreign market over the last three years (Shared distinction with)
- 1994 Manuel Noriega Morales Award in Mathematics. A Latin American recognition, awarded by the Organisation of American States, O.A.S., for his contributions to the mathematical analysis of various partial differential equations.
- Best Teacher Award 1995, 2006. Recognition for teaching excellence. It is granted by the School of Engineering and Sciences, based on teaching surveys given to undergraduate students.
- 1996 Manuel Montt Award. A national recognition, granted by the Pedro Montt Foundation, for the best scientific work published in the previous five years.
- Rectoral Medal (1996), Full Professor Medal (2002), University of Chile.
- Outstanding Alumnus of the Year (2003), Saint Gabriel English School.
- Award for the Generation of Scientific Knowledge (2022), based on WOS-ISI's data.

== Publications ==
Books and papers published include (cf. MathSciNet or Google Scholar for an extensive list)

- Problèmes Mathèmatiques en Couplage Fluide-Structure. Applications aux Faisceaux Tubulaires, Eyrolles, Paris, 1994, 376 pages, ISBN 978-2212016376, with J. Planchard, B. Thomas and M. Vanninathan.
- Fluids and Periodic Structures, J. Wiley & Sons, Masson, Paris, 1995, 333 pages, ISBN 9780471960591, with J. Planchard and M. Vanninathan.
- Boundary layers in the homogenization of a spectral problem in fluid-solid structures, SIAM J. Math. Anal. 29, p. 343-379, 1998, with G. Allaire.
- Bloch wave homogenization and spectral asymptotic analysis, J. Math. Pures et Appl. 77, p. 153–208, 1998, with G. Allaire.
- Bloch wave decomposition in the homogenization of periodically perforated media, Indiana Univ. Math. J. 48, p. 1447–1470, 1999, with D. Gómez, M. Lobo-Hidalgo and M.E. Pérez.
