= Francisco Bozinovic =

Chilean biologist and academic (1959–2023)

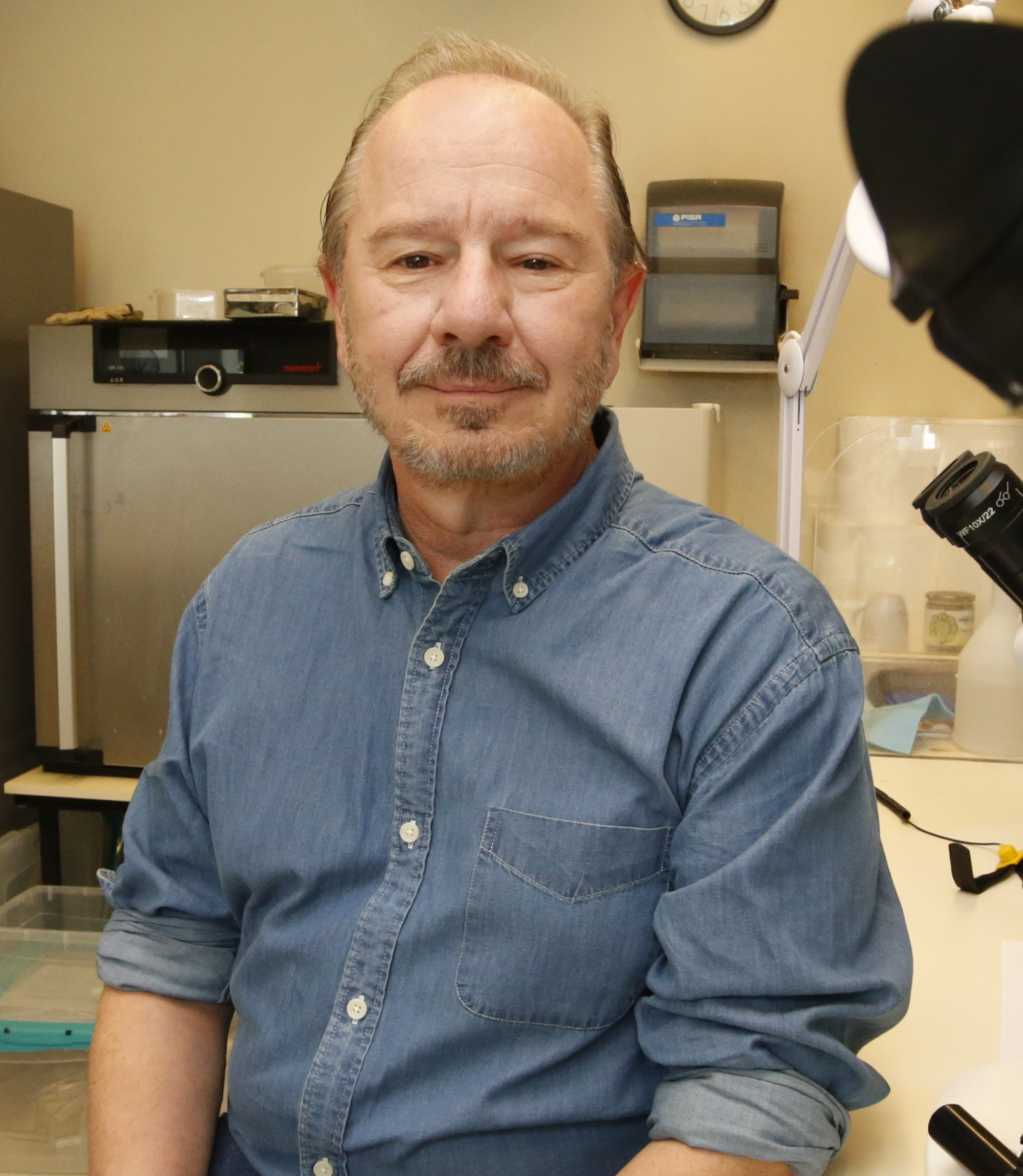
- Bozinovic in 2019
- Born: 6 June 1959; Punta Arenas, Magallanes Region, Chile
- Died: 1 January 2023 (aged 63); Santiago, Chile
- Occupation: Scientist

Francisco Bozinovic Kuscevic (6 June 1959 – 1 January 2023) was a Chilean-Croatian biologist and academic, mainly active in the field of evolutionary biology.

== Life and career ==
Born in Punta Arenas, Bozinovic graduated in Biology at the University of Chile in 1983 and got a PhD in Science in the same university in 1988. He was a postdoctoral fellow at the Carnegie Museum of Natural History in Pittsburgh. A member of the Chilean Academy of Sciences, he served as full professor at the Faculty of Biological Sciences of the Pontifical Catholic University of Chile. An author and co-author of over 350 scientific publications and about 20 books, during his career he received numerous accolades and honours, notably a Guggenheim Fellowship in 2010 and the 2020 National Prize for Natural Sciences. A new species of genus endemic to Chile discovered in 2016, the dromiciops bozinovici, was named after him by the Journal of Mammalogy.

Bozinovic died after a long battle against cancer on 1 January 2023, at the age of 63.
