= National Prize for Asturian Literature =

The National Prize for Asturian Literature is a literary award given by the Academy of the Asturian Language every three years to writers who are most known for their literary career in the Asturian language. The prize cannot be shared between more than one author nor cannot it be awarded posthumously. It was first awarded in 2017.

The jury that awards the prize is formed by the President of the Academy of the Asturian Language, three of the academy's members, a representative from the Asturian Government's Department of Education and Culture, and two specialists in Asturian literature who are well recognized in the academic world.

The prize includes an award of 3000 euros, a distinctive medallion designed by the sculptor Adolfo Manzano and the publication of a small anthology that is representative of the author's literary output.

== Awards given ==
The candidates for the first edition of the prize were Xuan Bello, Antón García, Roberto González-Quevedo, Berta Piñán, and Xuan Xosé Sánchez Vicente.

The jury's decision was published on January 13, 2017, which awarded the prize to Xuan Bello of Tineo.

The jury highlighted that he "placed Asturian on the map of national and international literature", referring specifically to his work Hestoria Universal de Paniceiros. The jury for this edition was composed by Ana María Cano (President of the Academy), Xosé Antón González Riaño, Xosé Román Iglesias, and Carmen Muñiz Chacón (members of the Academy); Fernando Padilla Palicio (representative of the Department of Education and Culture); and the University of Oviedo professors José Luis García Martín and Leopoldo Sánchez Torre.
