= National Prize of Chile =

Award granted by the government of Chile

The National Prize of Chile (Spanish: Premio Nacional de Chile) is the collective name given to a set of awards granted by the government of Chile through the Ministry of Education and, as of 2003, by the National Council of Culture and the Arts. They are presented by the President of the Republic at an official ceremony held at La Moneda Palace.

== Awards ==
- National Prize for Literature, since 1942
- National Prize for Journalism, since 1954
- National History Award, since 1974
- National Prize for Education Sciences, since 1981
- National Prize for Plastic Arts, since 1992
- National Prize for Musical Arts, since 1992
- National Prize for Performing and Audiovisual Arts, since 1992
- National Prize for Applied Sciences and Technologies, since 1992
- National Prize for Exact Sciences, since 1992
- National Prize for Natural Sciences, since 1992
- National Prize for Humanities and Social Sciences, since 1992

=== Former awards ===
- National Prize of Art, from 1944 to 1991
- National Prize for Sciences, from 1969 to 1991
