= Héctor Croxatto =

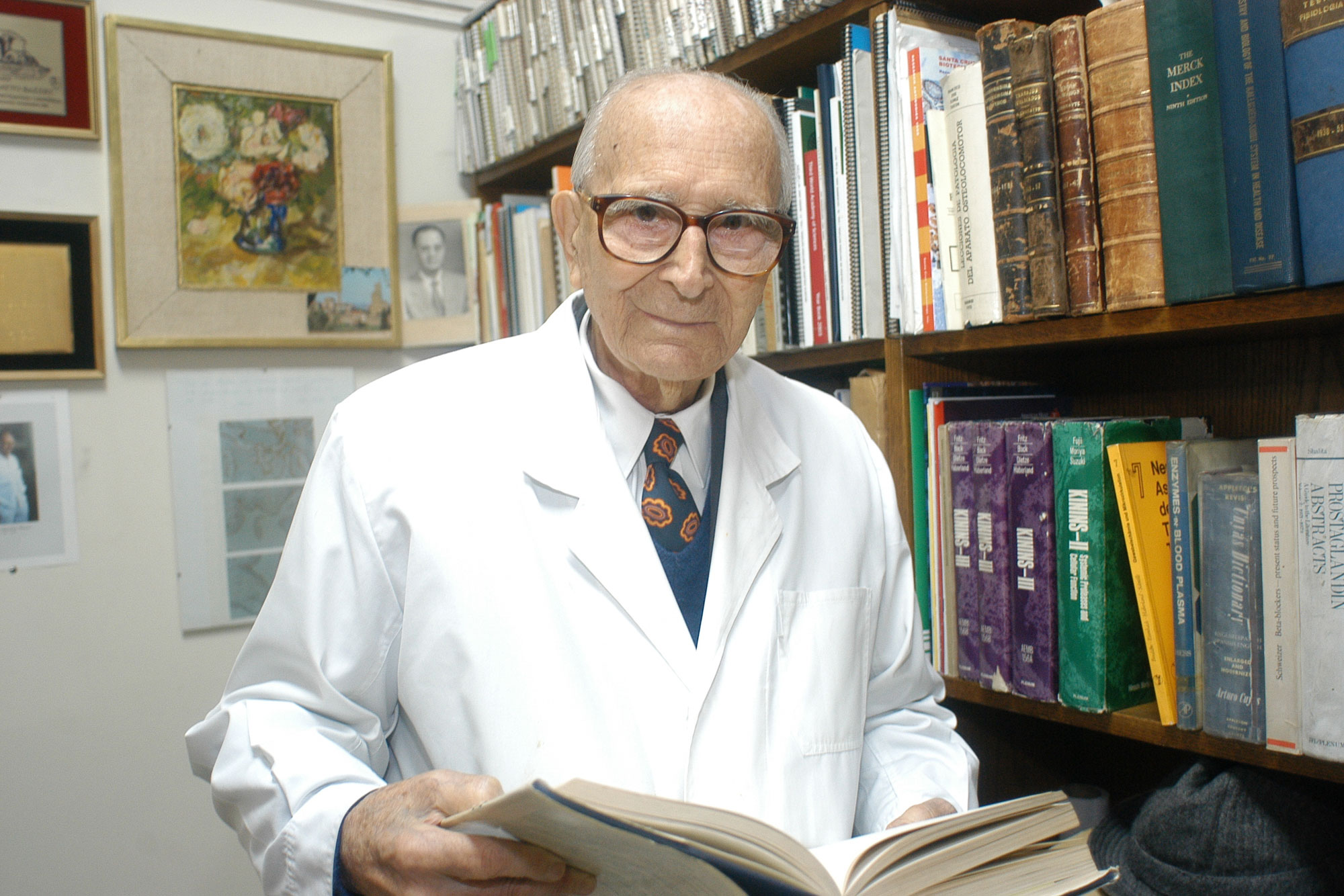
Héctor Croxatto

Héctor Croxatto Rezzio (3 July 1908—28 September 2010) was a Chilean physiologist. He won the Chilean National Prize for Sciences in 1979. He was a Member of the Pontifical Academy of Sciences.

Raised in Temuco, he studied medicine at the University of Chile in Santiago, where he received his medical degree in 1930. Physiology, biology and biochemistry were the bulk of his research interests. For two decades he taught physiology at the Instituto de Educación Física y Técnica of Casa de Bello. Later, he was dean of the medical faculty of the University of Chile. In 1969 he joined the Academy of Science of Chile. Seven years later he became a member of the Pontifical Academy of Sciences at the Vatican. Croxatto was one of the founders of The World Academy of Sciences in 1983.

He is the father of the medical doctor Horacio Croxatto and grandfather of the actress Luz Croxatto. He died in Santiago on 28 September 2010 at the age of 102.
