= José Zagal Moya =

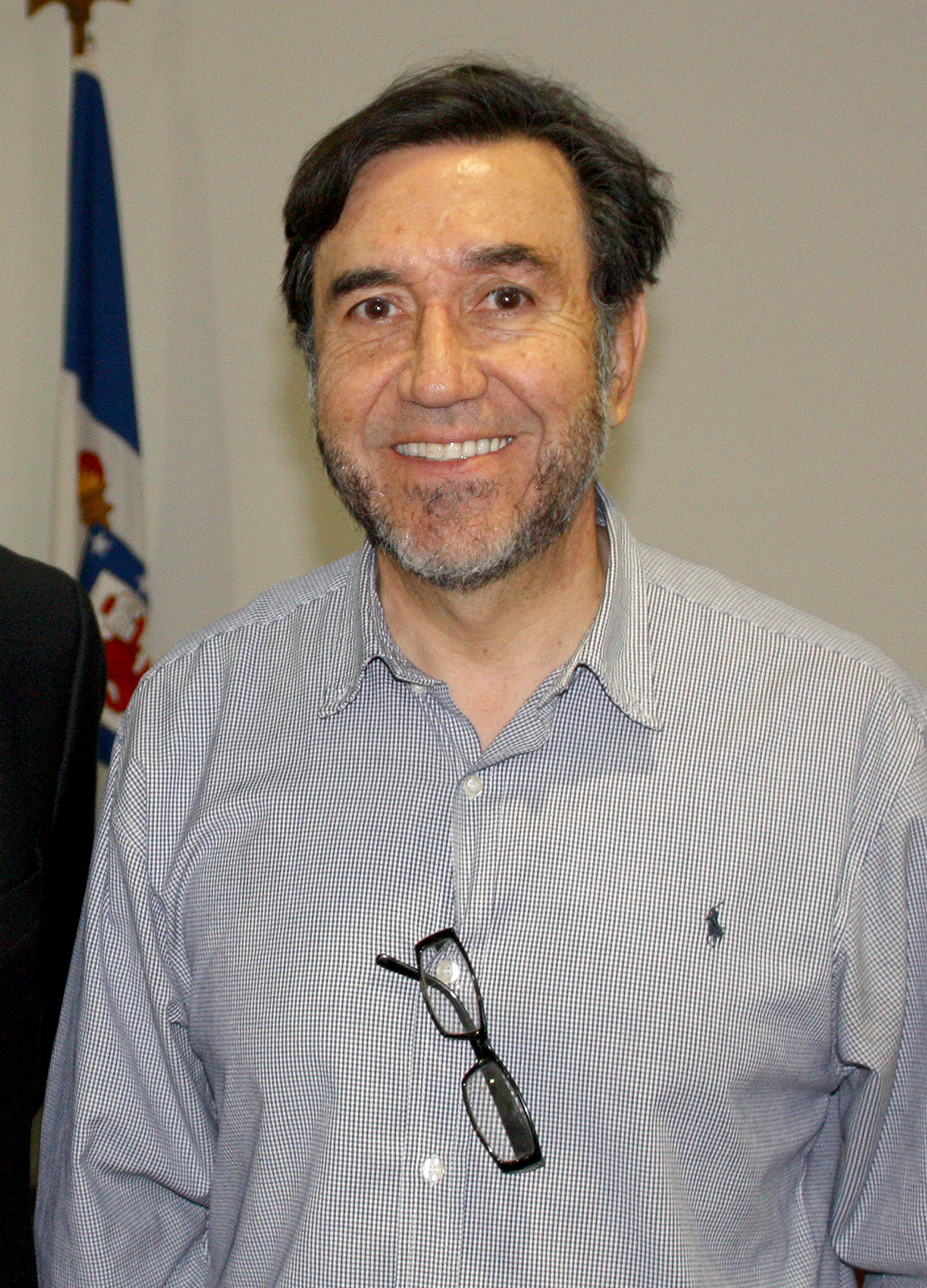
Dr. José H. Zagal

'Jose H. Zagal Moya (born in Talca Chile, December 19, 1949) is a Chilean scientist educated at the University of Chile with postgraduate training in the United States of America with a Ph.D. degree from Case Western Reserve University, Cleveland Ohio and postdoctoral training at Brookhaven National Laboratory, Upton, New York. At present he is a Distinguished Professor, Department of Chemistry and Materials, Faculty of Chemistry and Biology, Universidad de Santiago de Chile (USACH) where he directs the Laboratory of Electrocatalysis since 1982. He got his Ph.D. in chemistry Case Western Reserve University, US (1978) and was postdoctoral fellow at Brookhaven National Laboratory, Upton, New York, in 1982. His main research efforts are focused on the fundamentals of electron transfer reactions that are relevant for energy conversion and sensors. He has contributed in the area of electrocatalysis, electrodes modified with metal macrocyclics, electrochemistry of biological molecules, the catalysis of the reduction of molecular oxygen and many other reactions of relevance, conductive polymers, electrochemical sensors and in pioneering work in the establishment of non-linear correlations between thermodynamic properties of molecular catalysts and their electrochemical reactivity. These contributions are essential in the development of non-precious metal catalysts for energy conversion devices and electrochemical sensors. [1][2][3] He also has contributed in the field of corrosion, conductive polymers and his well-known volcano correlations for the electrocatalytic properties of surface-confined molecular catalysts

== Prizes and distinctions ==
He was awarded by the President of Chile, Eduardo Frei Ruiz-Tagle the Presidential Chair in Science in 1996 by a Committee chaired by a Nobel Prize in Chemistry Rudolph Marcus and including Physics Nobel Laureate David Gross. He received the Silver Medal “University Merit” in 1998 and the Gold Medal in 2002 and the Manuel Bulnes Medal in 2013. He was distinguished by Conicyt with “Fondecyt Diploma” for being awarded more than 10 consecutive research grants without rejects in 2012. He still remains unbeaten in Fondecyt. He has been awarded two Milenium Projects as Alternative Responsible Scientist and has participated in many other associative research projects in Chile and abroad. He was appointed by the President of Chile Sebastian Piñera Echeñique and the Minister of Education, Member of the Superior Council of Research of Conicyt for the period 2010–2013. In 2014 he received the Dr. Alberto Zanlungo Prize. He has received several distinctions from international scientific societies. He was appointed Fellow by the Royal Society of Chemistry (RSC) of the UK in 2018. He became a Member of the RSC in 2017. He received the Fellow Medal from the International Society of Electrochemistry based in Europe and the Fellow Medal from the US-based Electrochemical Society (ECS) both in 2014. This year he was incorporated as an Active Member to the Academy of Sciences of Latin America (ACAL) and became an Emeritus Member of The Electrochemical Society of the United States of America. He created the Chilean Secretary of ISE in 2003 and was his first chilean representative. He also created the Chile Section of ECS in 2011 and is presently its Chairman. He was a co-founder of the Chilean Society of Carbonaceous Materials and is presently its President. He is also the President of the Iberoamerican Chemical Society.

In 2024 he was awarded Chile's highest honor for scientific merit, the "Premio Nacional de Ciencias Naturales" or "National Prize in the Natural Sciences".

== Publications ==
He has published over 222 papers (200 indexed publications) coedited four books, 9 book chapters and 3 patents. H impact factor= 41 (Web of Science), H= 42 Scopus and H= 48 (Google Scholar) with more 7460 citations in Google. He has created three patents with the Chilean Navy on electrode materials for energy conversion. He has presented more than 300 papers in national and international meetings, including some plenary and invited lectures and keynotes worldwide. He has been a guest editor for the Journal of Applied Electrochemistry, The International Journal of Electrochemistry and recently in Current Opinion in Electrochemistry

== Training of professionals and scientists ==
He was involved in the creation of the Masters and Ph.D. Programs in Chemistry from his university and it was the very first doctoral program in Usach. He has supervised more 60 thesis: 36 undergraduate and professional students: 20 doctorates, 5 masters and 9 postdocs, some coming from Europe (Russian Federation, France, Germany, Spain and Italy).

=== Books ===
1) N4 Macrocyclic Metal Complexes. J.H. ZAGAL, F. Bedioui, J.P. Dodelet (Eds), Springer New York ( 2006).

- Electroquímica: voltametrías sobre electrodo sólido. Fethi Bedioui, Silvia Gutiérrez Granados, Alejandro Alatorre Ordaz y 2) J.H. ZAGAL, Sello Editorial Usach, (2009).

3https://www.springer.com/la/book/9783319311708) “Electrochemistry of MN4 macrocyclic metal complexes” Volume 1 Energy: “Electrochemistry of MN4 Macrocyclic complexes” J.H. Zagal, F. Bedioui (Eds) Springer Switzerland (2016) (segunda edición) 316 páginas. 4) https://www.springer.com/gb/book/9783319313306 “Electrochemistry of MN4 macrocyclic metal complexes” Volume 2 Biomimesis, Electroanalysis, and Electrosynthesis of MN4 complexes” J.H. Zagal, F. Bedioui, (Eds) Springer Switzerland (2016) (segunda edición) 436 páginas

=== Editorial boards ===
He has been involved in many editorial boards of scientific journals. He was member of the editorial board of the Journal of Applied Electrochemistry (1988-2010), Journal of the Chilean Chemical Society (1984-2007) and Electrocatalysis (2010-2015) and is presently member of the Editorial Board of several international publications: Journal of Solid State Electrochemistry (Springer), International Journal of Electrochemistry (Hindawi), Electrochemistry Communications (Elsevier), Journal of the Serbian Chemical Society, Electrochemical Energy Technology (De Goutyer) and Chimica Nova and Frontiers in Chemistry. He has been a Guest Editor for the Journal of Applied Electrochemistry, Current Opinion in Electrochemistry and for the International Journal of Electrochemistry.

== Hobbies ==
Professor Zagal is also a man of many talents: he sings and plays several instruments, including the guitar and the scottish bagpipes. He also writes poetry, paints and draws cartoons. He played Caiphas in the Opera Rock Jesus Christ Superstar in the early 70's. He has been a volunteer firemen with the 14th British and Commonwealth Fire & Rescue Company in Santiago since 1972 and is also the official piper of his company. Some of his caricatures have been published in the magazine “Interface” of the Electrochemical Society and in the Journal of the Serbian Chemical Society. He is a devoted train enthusiast. He has built large replicas or working steam locomotive and full size freight wagons. He also collects full size railway items including 12 wagons and 2 locomotives, one steam and an electric locomotive. With other enthusiasts he started in the 80's the "Chilean Association for the Preservation of the Railways". With two other enthusiasts he owns the "Puangue Station" which is one of the few preserved railway stations in rural areas.
