= María Luz Cárdenas =

French scientist (born 1944)

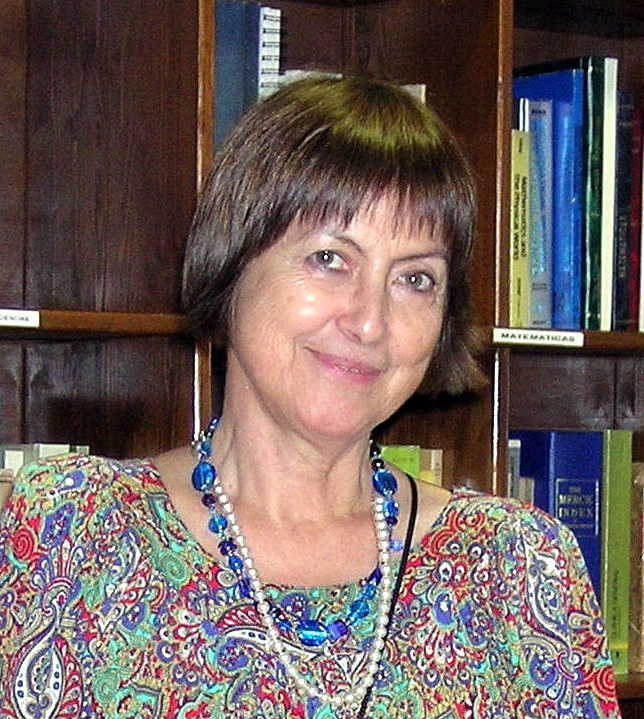
- María Luz Cárdenas in Tenerife, 2008
- Born: María de la Luz Ilze Palmira Antonia Cárdenas Cerda; 7 June 1944 (age 81); Santiago, Chile
- Education: University of Chile
- Known for: Discvery of kinetic cooperativity in a monomeric enzyme
- Spouse: Athel Cornish-Bowden
- Awards: Tito Ureta Prize, Chilean Society of Biochemistry and Molecular Biology
- Scientific career
- Fields: Enzyme kinetics, nature of life
- Institutions: University of Chile; Birmingham University; Aix-Marseille University; CNRS, Marseille
- Thesis: Glucoquinasa, una enzima monomérica con cinética cooperativa (1982)
- Academic advisors: Hermann Niemeyer

María Luz Cárdenas Cerda (born 7 June 1944) is a French biochemist of Chilean origin. She is known for studies of mammalian hexokinases and for developing understanding of the nature of life.

== Personal life ==
María Luz Cárdenas was born on 7 June 1944 in Santiago, Chile, the daughter of Palmira Rebeca Cerda Fuenzalida and Oscar Guillermo Cárdenas Ubilla, and she spent her early life and education in Santiago. After four years in Birmingham, United Kingdom, she moved to Marseille, France in 1987 as a researcher in the CNRS, and remained there for the rest of her working life.

She married Athel Cornish-Bowden in 1982 and had one daughter.

== Education ==
Cárdenas studied biochemistry at the University of Chile, and worked for her doctoral thesis with Hermann Niemeyer.

== Career ==
In Chile in the 1980s and earlier there were no grants for post-graduate students, and so it was necessary for Cárdenas to work as a teaching assistant and lecturer at the University of Chile at the same time as working towards her doctorate under Hermann Niemeyer, with a thesis entitled Glucoquinasa, una enzima monomérica con cinética cooperativa (Glucokinase, a monomeric enzyme with kinetic cooperativity).

== Research ==
=== Hexokinase D ===
Cárdenas's doctoral research led to a major discovery, that rat-liver hexokinase D (often called “glucokinase”) was a monomeric enzyme that displayed positive cooperativity, later confirmed by others. Although kinetic models of cooperativity had been proposed (for example by Ferdinand and by Rabin) these were not widely believed to have practical importance, and cooperativity was usually assumed to require binding equilibrium and interactions between multiple binding sites. Hexokinase D was thus the first enzyme for which the cooperativity could not be explained in terms of the best known models. Cárdenas and co-workers suggested that the cooperativity could be explained by a slow-transition model.

The name “glucokinase” for hexokinase D is now virtually universal in the literature, and there is little likelihood of changing that. However, it is important to realize that it is a misleading name, because it implies that hexokinase D is more specific for glucose than the other mammalian hexokinases, but that is not the case, as it accepts fructose as a good substrate.

Although the monomeric cooperativity exhibited by hexokinase D proved to be rare, it was not the only example.

Cárdenas's book “Glucokinase”: Its Regulation and Role in Liver Metabolism collects a large amount of information about the enzyme, not only about its kinetics and cooperativity, but its physiological importance in regulating glucose uptake by the liver, and genetic aspects. Her work on hexokinase D inevitably led to study of the other mammalian hexokinase isoenzymes and their evolution, as set out in her review.

=== Nature of life ===
In the last 20 years of her career, Cárdenas's interest turned to the nature of life, self-organization, and LUCA (the last universal common ancestor).

== Honours ==
In 1993 Cárdenas was appointed to the honorary chair "Hermann Niemeyer F." at the Faculty of Sciences of the University de Chile. In 2002 she was elected corresponding member of the Chilean Academy of Sciences. In 2016 she was awarded the Tito Ureta Prize of the Chilean Society of Biochemistry and Molecular Biology. In 2023 she was elected Honorary Member of the Spanish Society of Biochemistry and Molecular Biology. In 2024 the French Society of Biochemistry and Molecular Biology nominated her as one of 36 women scientists celebrated by FEBS, recognizing her creation as a thematic group of the Society the Association pour les Femmes en Sciences et Ingénierie as a way of contributing to the visibility of women scientists,
