= Jeremy R. Knowles =

British chemist (1935–2008)

Jeremy Knowles CBE FRS
- Born: Jeremy Randall Knowles; 28 April 1935; Rugby, England
- Died: 3 April 2008 (aged 72); Cambridge, Massachusetts
- Education: Balliol College, Oxford (BA); Merton College, Oxford (DPhil)
- Known for: Enzyme catalysis
- Awards: Welch Award in Chemistry (1995); Nakanishi Prize (1999)
- Scientific career
- Fields: Biochemistry
- Workplaces: California Institute of Technology; Oxford University; Harvard University
- Thesis: Intramolecular effects in aromatic systems (1961)
- Academic advisors: Richard Norman, George S. Hammond
- Doctoral students: Hagan Bayley; Joshua Boger; Stephen L. Buchwald; Athel Cornish-Bowden; James Kadonaga; Ronald T. Raines
- Other notable students: Lia Addadi; Andreas Plückthun

Jeremy Randall Knowles CBE FRS (28 April 1935 – 3 April 2008) was a professor of chemistry at Harvard University who served as dean of the Harvard University faculty of arts and sciences (FAS) from 1991 to 2002. He joined Harvard in 1974, received many awards for his research, and remained at Harvard until his death, leaving the faculty for a decade to serve as Dean. Knowles died on 3 April 2008 at his home.

In 2006, he was selected by incoming interim president Derek Bok to return to his position as Dean of the Faculty of Arts and Sciences on an interim basis, replacing William C. Kirby.

== Biography ==
Knowles was born in England in 1935, educated at Magdalen College School, Oxford, Balliol College, Oxford (BA 1958, first class degree in Chemistry 1959), and Merton College, Oxford (DPhil 1961). He was a Pilot Officer in the Royal Air Force. As an undergraduate he did research in Richard Norman's physical organic chemistry laboratory. There, he studied electronic effects on the rates of aromatic substitution reactions. In 1960, he became a University Lecturer at Oxford, and Fellow of Wadham College, Oxford.

== Career and research ==
In 1961, he took a post-doctoral fellowship at the California Institute of Technology, working with George S. Hammond, who was an organic photo-chemist. Together, they found that some catalyzed reactions can occur up to one-million times faster than non-catalyzed reactions. Intrigued by this discovery, Knowles became an enzymologist. For a brief time, Knowles was a visiting professor at Yale University. in 1974, Knowles moved his research group to Harvard and became a professor there.

Knowles's research was on the boundary of chemistry and biochemistry, and concerned the rate and specificity of enzyme catalysis and the evolution of enzyme function. Early in his career, Knowles studied α-chymotrypsin and pepsin, which are nonspecific proteases, meaning they accept a broad range of substrates. He researched what made these enzymes nonspecific and how they increased the rate of peptide-bond hydrolysis. In 1972, Knowles developed a method for photo-affinity labelling, enabling the formation of a covalent bond between a protein and a ligand under the control of light.

Knowles then began seminal studies on the glycolytic enzyme triosephosphate isomerase (TIM). He took advantage of its simplicity—interconverting a single substrate and a single product. Using the enediol intermediate of the reaction (which allowed solvent protons to enter the reaction from the middle instead of only from the substrate or product) and kinetic isotope effects, he measured the relative free energy of each intermediate and transition state, which allowed him to depict the first free energy profile for an enzyme-catalyzed reaction. This work was done with his long-term collaborator, John Albery. His profile showed that TIM was a "perfect" enzyme in that catalysis is limited only by the rate of diffusion. Later, Knowles applied similar methods to proline racemase, developing an elegant method to discern whether a reaction proceeds via a stepwise or concerted manner and discovering the consequences of "oversaturation", a situation in which the interconversion of unliganded forms of the enzyme limit catalysis.

At Harvard, Knowles also did important work on β-lactamases and their mechanism-based inhibitors. And, he provided key insight on the stereochemistry of phosphoryl group transfer reactions, using synthetic phosphoryl groups containing ^{16}O, ^{17}O, and ^{18}O isotopes.

Knowles was the author of more than 250 research papers, and advised many doctoral students and post-doctoral researchers at Oxford and at Harvard, including Hagan Bayley, Stephen L. Buchwald, Athel Cornish-Bowden, Andreas Plückthun, and Ronald T. Raines.

=== Awards and honours ===
Knowles was elected a Fellow of the Royal Society (FRS), a Fellow of the American Academy of Arts and Sciences (FAAAS) in 1982, and member of American Philosophical Society in 1988, the American Association for the Advancement of Science, and a Foreign Associate of the National Academy of Sciences. Among his awards are the Royal Society of Chemistry's Charmian Medal, the Bader Award, the Repligen Corporation Award in Chemistry of Biological Processes, the Prelog Medal, the Robert A. Welch Award in Chemistry, the Arthur C. Cope Scholar Award, and the Nakanishi Prize. He was awarded the Davy Medal of the Royal Society, and was an Honorary Fellow of Balliol College and of Wadham College, Oxford. He held honorary degrees from the University of Edinburgh and the Eidgenössische Technische Hochschule in Zürich. He was appointed Order of the British Empire in the 1993 Birthday Honours. He was elected one of nine Trustees of the Howard Hughes Medical Institute in 1998.

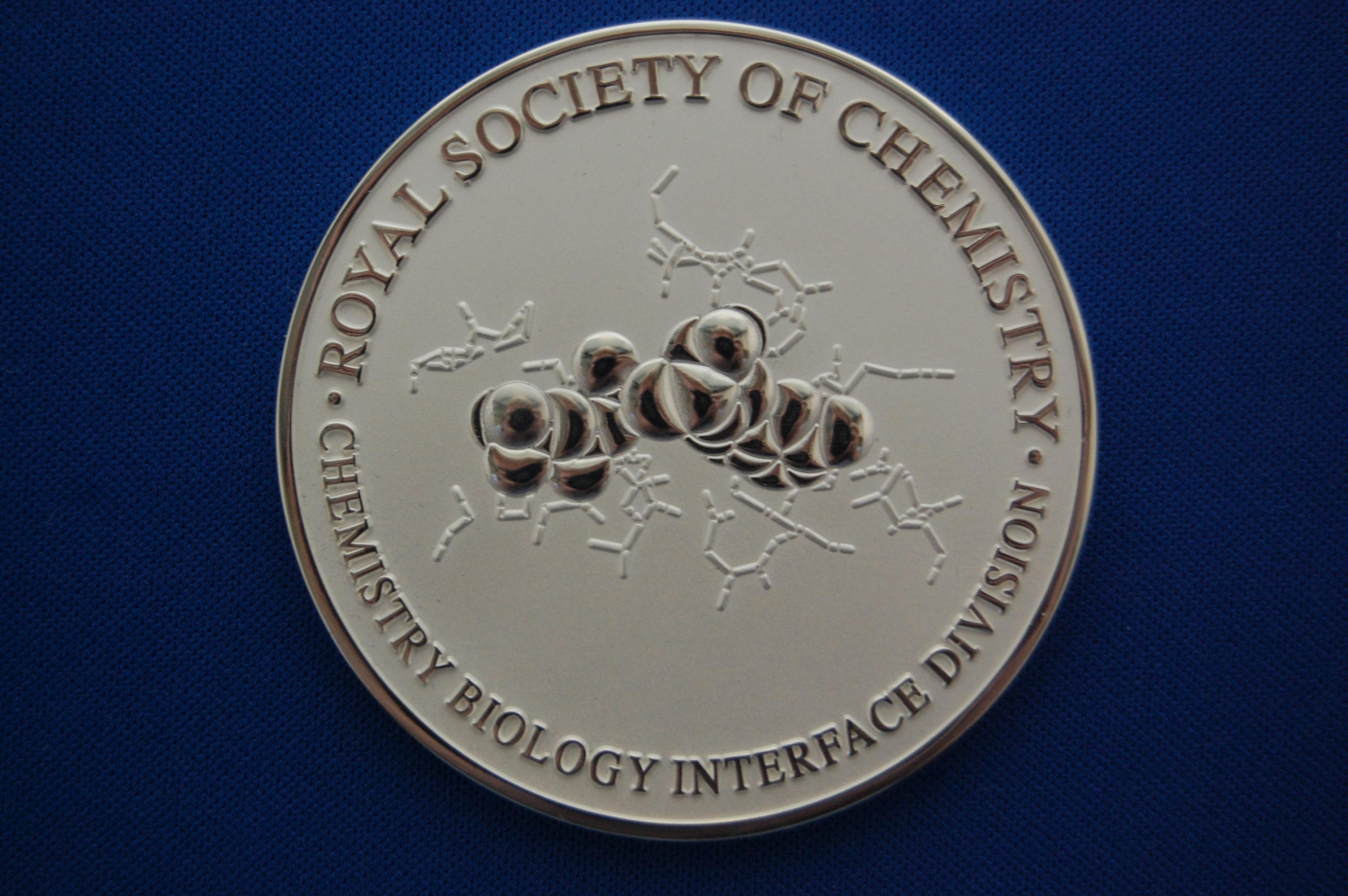
Royal Society of Chemistry – Jeremy Knowles Award (2014)

The Royal Society of Chemistry awards a "Jeremy Knowles Award", "to recognise and promote the importance of inter- and multi-disciplinary research between chemistry and the life sciences".

== Personal life ==
Knowles married Jane Sheldon Davis in 1960, and together they had three sons.
