= Cecilia Hidalgo Tapia =

Chilean biochemist

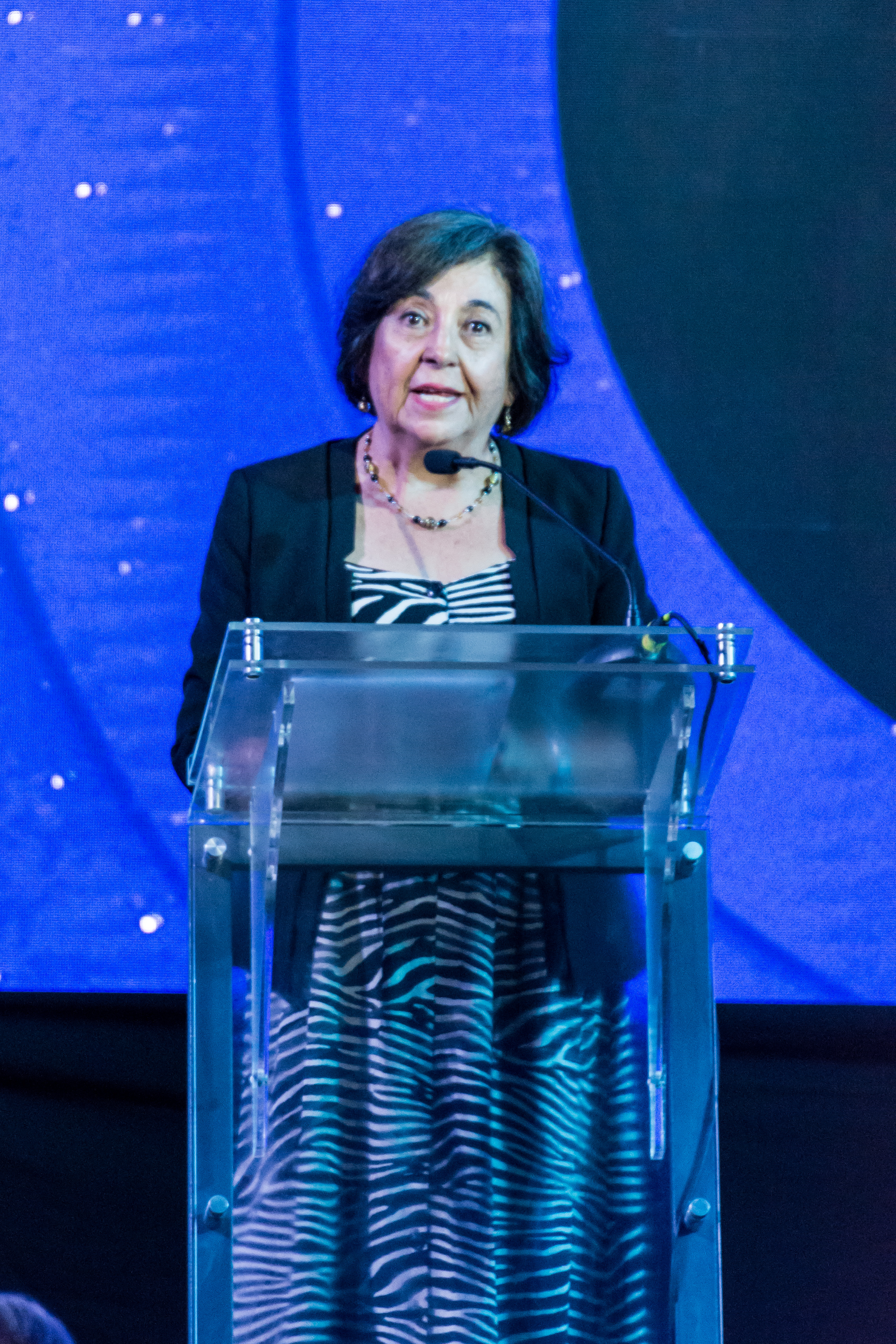
- Citizenship: United States
- Awards: National Prize for Natural Sciences (2006)
- Scientific career
- Fields: Chemistry, Biochemistry, Medicine
- Institutions: University of Chile

Maria Cecilia Tapia Hidalgo, known as Cecilia Tapia Hidalgo, is a Chilean biochemist and a member of the faculty at the University of Chile. In 2006 she received Chile's National Prize for Natural Sciences, becoming the first woman to win the award.

== Biography ==
Hidalgo completed her undergraduate studies at the University of Chile, graduating with a degree in biochemistry in 1965. Four years later, she earned her doctorate in science at the same university. She later traveled to the United States for postdoctoral studies at the National Institutes of Health. Between 1992 and 1993 she was the recipient of a Guggenheim Fellowship.

As a teacher, she taught at the Center for Scientific Studies (Centro de Estudios Científicos) between 1984 and 2002. She has taught at the Faculty of Medicine at the University of Chile since 1984. Between 1995 and 2001, she was a member of the Presidential Advisory Commission on scientific matters. Later, between 2001 and 2003, she served as Program Director of the Cell Biology and Molecular Biomedical Sciences Institute. She is the director of the FONDAP Center for Molecular Studies of the Cell and part of the Faculty of Medicine of the University of Chile. She is also vice president of the Advisory Council for the Foundation for Young Scientists.

In 2004 the University of Chile awarded her the Amanda Labaras Medal of Merit, intended to celebrate the personality and work of women from the university who have made outstanding contributions in the field of their profession, in the domain of culture or in the service of the country. In 2006, she received the National Prize for Natural Sciences, the first woman to win this award. One of her areas of study is the regulation of intracellular calcium.

== See also ==
- Timeline of women in science
