= National Prize for Education Sciences (Chile) =

- For contribution to the development of education at any of its levels, or to the sciences of education in Chile
- Sponsored by: Ministry of Education
- Country: Chile
- First award: 1979
- Currently held by: Abraham Magendzo Kolstrein
- Website: premiosnacionales.mineduc.cl

The National Prize for Education Sciences (Spanish: Premio Nacional de Ciencias de la Educación) was created in 1979 and is awarded every two years, in accordance with Law 19169 of 1992. It is part of the National Prize of Chile granted by the Ministry of Education.

The jury electing the winner is formed by the Minister of Education, the Rector of the University of Chile, the last awardee, and two professors appointed by the Council of Rectors among the universities that deliver the Bachelor of Science in education. The floating members of the jury are announced in the month of July of the year of the contest.

The prize consists of a diploma, a cash prize of about 17 million pesos (US$22,399) and a lifetime pension of 20 monthly tax units (approximately US$1,600).

== Winners ==
- 1979, Roberto Munizaga Aguirre
- 1981, Teresa Clerc
- 1983, Luis Gómez Catalán
- 1985, José Valentín Herrera González
- 1987, Marino Pizarro Pizarro
- 1989, Eliodoro Cereceda Arancibia
- 1991, Viola Soto Guzmán
- 1993, Ernesto Livacic
- 1995, Hugo Montes
- 1997, Gabriel Castillo Inzulza
- 1999, Patricio Cariola Barroilhet
- 2001, Hernán Vera Lamperein
- 2003, Mabel Condemarín
- 2005, Héctor Gutiérrez Muñoz
- 2007, Ernesto Schiefelbein Fuenzalida
- 2009, Mario Leyton Soto
- 2011, Erika Himmel König
- 2013, Beatrice Ávalos Davidson
- 2015, Iván Núñez Prieto
- 2017, Abraham Magendzo Kolstrein
