= Ricardo Baeza Rodríguez =

Chilean number theorist

Academic background
- Education: Saarland University

Academic work
- Discipline: Mathematics
- Sub-discipline: Number theory
- Institutions: University of Talca

Ricardo Baeza Rodríguez is a Chilean mathematician who works as a professor at the University of Talca. He earned his Ph.D. in 1970 from Saarland University, under the joint supervision of Robert W. Berger and Manfred Knebusch. His research interest is in number theory.

== Career ==
Baeza became a member of the Chilean Academy of Sciences in 1983. He was the 2009 winner of the Chilean National Prize for Exact Sciences. In 2012, he became one of the inaugural fellows of the American Mathematical Society, the only Chilean to be so honored.

== Research ==
In 1990, Baeza proved the norm theorem over characteristic two; it had been previously proved in other characteristics. The theorem states that if q is a nonsingular quadratic form over a field F, and $\pi(t)\in F[t]$ be a monic irreducible polynomial (with $F(\pi) := F[t]/\pi(t)$ the corresponding field extension), then $(\pi(t))\otimes q\cong q$ if and only if $q\otimes F(\pi)$ is hyperbolic.

In 1992, Baeza and Roberto Aravire introduced a modification of Milnor's k-theory for quadratic forms over a field of characteristic two. In particular, if $W_q(F)$ denotes the Witt group of quadratic forms over a field F, then one can construct a group $k_n(F)$ and an isomorphism $s_n : h_n(F) \to I^{n - 1}W_q(F)/I^nW_q(F)$ for every value of n.

In 2003, Baeza and Aravire studied quadratic forms and differential forms over certain function fields of an algebraic variety of characteristic two. Using this result, they deduced the characteristic two analogue of Knebusch's degree conjecture.

In 2007, Baeza and Arason found a group presentation of the groups $I^n(K)\subset W(K)$, generated by n-fold bilinear Pfister forms, and of the groups $I^nW_q(K)\subset W_q(K)$, generated by quadratic Pfister forms.

== Publications ==
- Baeza, Ricardo (2006). Quadratic Forms Over Semilocal Rings. Springer. ISBN 9783540358169.
