= Sôki =

The Sôki ('two' in Selkʼnam) was a two-seat three-wheeled microcar battery electric vehicle produced by the Chilean manufacturer Voze EV with the support of CORFO. It is the only electric vehicle aimed at commercial mass production in Chile and the second vehicle to be built by Voze after the company's first prototype Lüfke in 2014. It is a for urban use. Its aim was to combine the advantages of three vehicles, the comfort and security of a car, the agility and homologation of a motorcycle and the ecology and economy of a bicycle.

It had of an electrical motor with 7 kW (10 HP) of power. A complete charge took about three hours. It had a range of 60 kilometres with a maximum speed of 60 km/h.

It was designed and is manufactured in the Centre for the Innovation and Development of the Industry, situated in the commune of Quinta Normal in the city of Santiago. It was presented and launched to the Chilean market on 22 September 2015 in the Municipalidad of Quinta Normal. Its first delivery was estimated for March 2016, the year it would arrive to Europe.
