= Mathematical engineering =

Use of mathematics to solve engineering problems

Mathematical engineering is an interdisciplinary academic and professional field that combines mathematics, engineering, and computational science to model, analyze, and solve real-world problems in engineering, industry, finance, and technology. Mathematical engineers use advanced mathematical methods to develop algorithms, simulations, and predictive models for complex systems.

Mathematical engineering is not as established as mathematical physics, so researchers focus on sub-fields like information theory, control theory, signal processing, image processing, theory of computation, systems theory.

== See also ==
- Applied mathematics
- Computational mathematics
- Operations research
- Systems engineering
- Control theory
- Engineering mathematics

== Sources ==
- Kailath, Thomas (1997). "Norbert Wiener and the Development of Mathematical Engineering". Communications, Computation, Control, and Signal Processing. Boston, MA: Springer US. pp. 35–64. doi:10.1007/978-1-4615-6281-8_2. ISBN 978-1-4613-7883-9. JSTOR 24099553.
