= FONDECYT =

Chilean national technological and scientific research fund

Fondo Nacional de Desarrollo Científico y Tecnológico
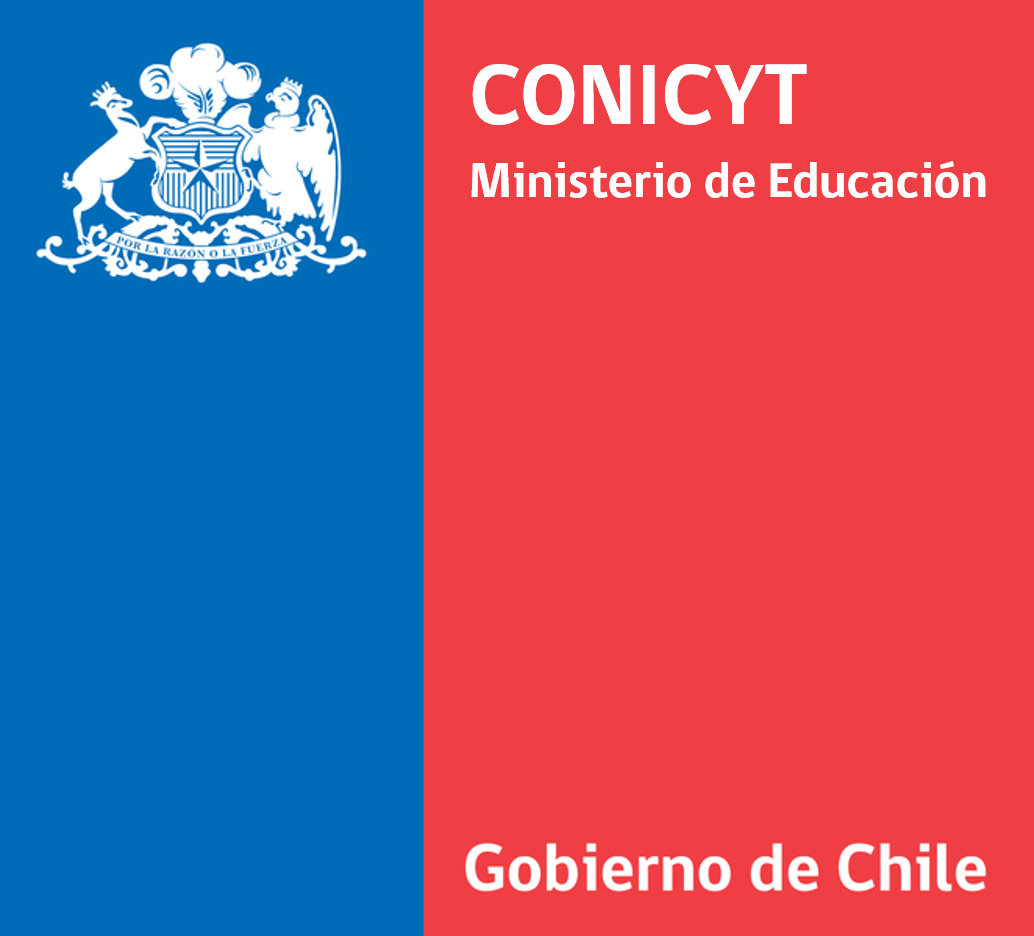
- Logo for the National Commission for Scientific and Technological Research (CONICYT).
- Established: 1984
- Type: public
- Headquarters: Santiago, Chile
- Parent organization: CONICYT
- Website: www.conicyt.cl/fondecyt

The National Fund for Scientific and Technological Development (Spanish: Fondo Nacional de Desarrollo Científico y Tecnológico), abbreviated FONDECYT, is the main public fund of the Government of Chile to promote basic scientific and technological research in all areas of knowledge. It is managed by the National Commission for Scientific and Technological Research (CONICYT).

The fund was established in 1981 and began operations in 1982. Since then it has funded more than 16,000 research projects. In 1991 CONICYT opened a second fund, FONDEF (The Science & Technology Development Fund), with the aim of promoting public–private collaboration in research and development.

== Selection of projects ==
The program provides financial support for projects selected under three headings:

- Regular selection: for established researchers.
- Selection for the Initiation of Research: opened in 2006 for young and emerging researchers.
- Chilean Postdoctoral selection: for early career scientists to perform postdoctoral research in Chile.
