= National Research and Development Agency (Chile) =

The National Research and Development Agency (ANID, Spanish: Agencia National de Investigación y Desarrollo) is a scientific funding agency of the government of Chile, founded on January 1, 2020. It is a part of the Ministry of Science, Technology, Knowledge and Innovation.

== CONICYT ==
Comisión Nacional de Investigación Científica y Tecnológica
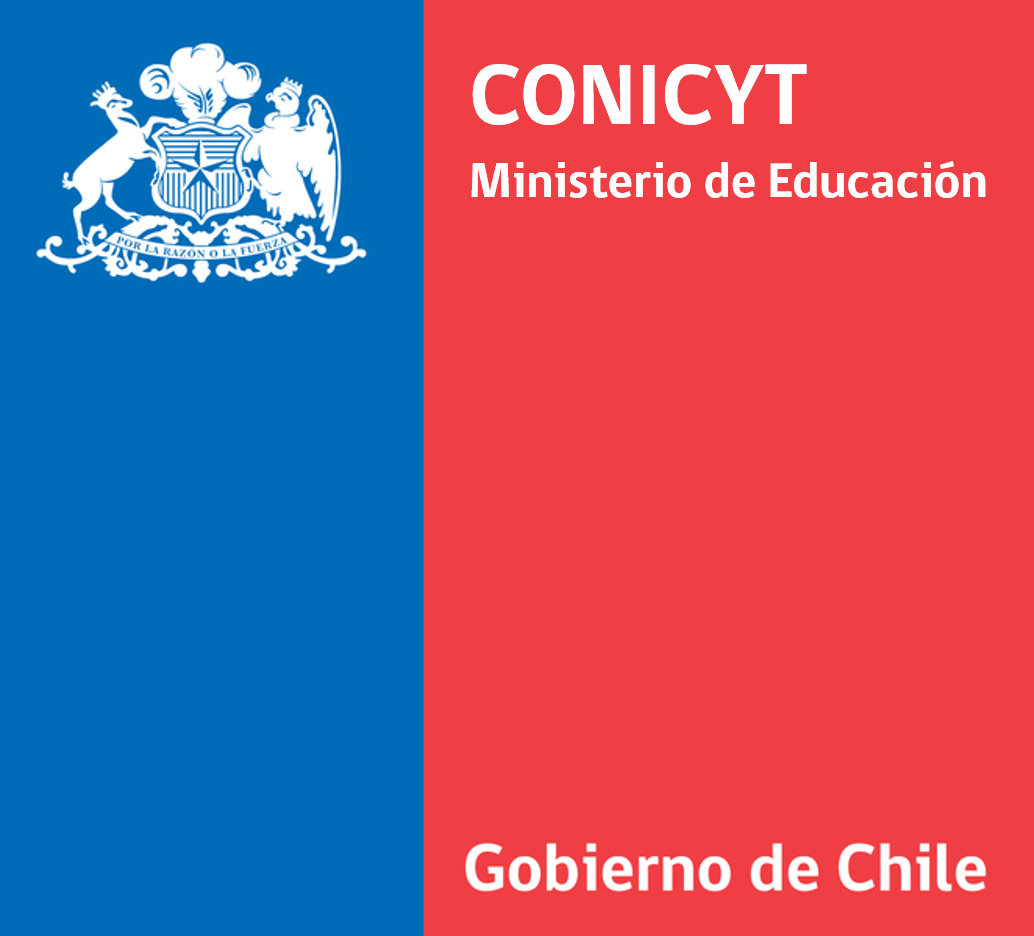
- Logo of the CONICYT

Agency overview
- Formed: May 20, 1967; 59 years ago
- Headquarters: Moneda 1375, Santiago
- Agency executives: Alejandra Mizala Salces, Vice President of the Council; Alejandra Pizarro, Executive Director (I)
- Website: www.conicyt.cl

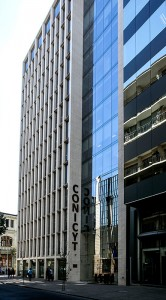
The CONICYT building in downtown Santiago, Chile.

CONICYT was founded in 1967 as the Chilean government agency responsible for coordinating, promoting and aiding scientific research in the country. The name is an acronym of Comisión Nacional de Investigación Científica y Tecnológica meaning "National Commission for Scientific and Technological Research". CONICYT was part of the Ministry of Education.

In 2020, it became ANID.

== Grant programs ==
ANID (or formerly as CONICYT) provides grants through several programs:

- FONDECYT (National Fund for Scientific and Technological Development)
- FONDEF (Fund for the Promotion of Scientific and Technological Development)
- FONDAP (Financing Fund Research Centres in Priority Areas)
- National Fund for Research and Development in Health
- Regional Fund for Scientific and Technological Development
- Explore program

== See also ==
- Science and technology in Chile
