= List of Guggenheim Fellowships awarded in 2001 =

Fellowships

The following Guggenheim Fellowships were awarded in 2001.

== US and Canadian Fellows ==
- Geneive Abdo, independent scholar, Washington, D. C.; senior research associate, Middle East Institute, Columbia University: Faith, power, and the new Iran.
- Jeremy Adelman, professor of history, Princeton University: The political economy of revolution in South America, 1750–1824.
- Catherine J. Allen, professor of anthropology and international affairs, George Washington University: Cultural patterning in Andean art.
- Fred Anderson, associate professor of history, University of Colorado at Boulder: Empire and liberty in North America, 1500–2000.
- Ray Anderson, composer, Setauket, New York; member of the guest faculty in music, State University of New York at Stony Brook: Music composition.
- Tom Andrews, poet, Athens, Greece; member of the faculty, MFA Program for Writers, Warren Wilson College: Poetry.
- Ann W. Astell, professor of English, Purdue University: Medieval asceticism, mysticism, and aesthetics.
- Cristina Bacchilega, professor of English, University of Hawaii at Manoa: Narrative and the politics of landmarks in Hawaii.
- Charlotte Bacon, writer, Lee, New Hampshire; assistant professor of English, University of New Hampshire: Fiction.
- Claude Baker, composer, Bloomington, Indiana; professor of music composition, Indiana University Bloomington: Music composition.
- John A. Bargh, professor of psychology and director, graduate program in social psychology, New York University: Nonconscious forms of self-regulation.
- James R. Bartholomew, professor of modern Japanese history, Ohio State University: Japan and the Nobel science prizes, 1901–1949.
- Harry William Bartnick, artist, Beverly, Massachusetts; associate professor of painting and color theory, New England School of Art and Design, Suffolk University: Painting.
- Frank D. Bean, professor of sociology and director, Center for Research on Immigration, Population and Public Policy, University of California, Irvine: Multiracial identification and America's color lines.
- James J. Beatty, associate professor of physics and of astronomy and astrophysics, Pennsylvania State University: Studies of the highest energy cosmic rays.
- Florence Bernault, associate professor of African history, University of Wisconsin–Madison: The invention of witchcraft in colonial and postcolonial Gabon.
- B. Douglas Bernheim, Lewis and Virginia Eaton Professor of Economics, Stanford University: The political economy of legislative institutions and policy formation.
- Jason Berry, writer, New Orleans: A history of jazz funerals in New Orleans.
- Maggie Bickford, associate professor of history of art and architecture, Brown University: Auspicious visuality in China.
- Ralph Blumenthal, writer, New York City; arts and culture news reporter, The New York Times: The reforms of the Sing Sing warden Lewis E. Lawes.
- Christopher Boehm, professor of anthropology and director, Jane Goodall Research Center, University of Southern California: The evolution of conflict resolution.
- Michele H. Bogart, professor of art history, State University of New York at Stony Brook: The Art Commission and public culture in New York City.
- Natalie Bookchin, new media artist, Los Angeles; member of the faculty, California Institute of the Arts: New media art.
- Kevin Boyle, associate professor of history, University of Massachusetts Amherst: The 1925 Sweet trials and the modern civil rights movement.
- Christopher Bram, writer, New York City: Fiction.
- Martha Burgess, new media artist, Brooklyn, New York; member of the adjunct faculty in photography, Parsons School of Design, New School University: New media art.
- Charles Cajori, artist, Watertown, Connecticut; Instructor in Art, New York Studio School of Drawing, Painting and Sculpture: Painting and drawing.
- Kathleen Cambor, writer, Houston, Texas: Fiction.
- Ardis Cameron, director of American and New England studies, University of Southern Maine: Peyton Place as a social and cultural artifact.
- Alan Campion, Dow Chemical Company Professor of Chemistry and university distinguished teaching professor, University of Texas at Austin: Spectroscopic studies of molecules adsorbed on solid surfaces.
- Jem Cohen, film maker, Brooklyn, New York: film making.
- Cathy C. Cook, film maker, Brooklyn, New York; visiting assistant professor of film, Sarah Lawrence College: Film making.
- Marsha Cottrell, artist, Brooklyn, New York: Drawing.
- John E. Crowley, George Munro Professor of History, Dalhousie University: Landscape art and Anglo-American identities in North America.
- Patricia Curd, professor of philosophy, Purdue University: A translation and study of Anaxagoras of Clazomenae.
- Gregory D'Alessio, composer, Cleveland, Ohio; assistant professor of music composition, Cleveland State University: Music composition.
- Lynn Dally, choreographer, Santa Monica, California; artistic director, Jazz Tap Ensemble, Los Angeles; visiting assistant professor of world arts and cultures, University of California, Los Angeles: Choreography.
- Richard H. Davis, associate professor of religion, Bard College: Processions in medieval South India.
- Marcel Detienne, Gildersleeve Professor of Classics, Johns Hopkins University: The gods of politics in early Greek cities.
- Tom D. Dillehay, professor of anthropology, University of Kentucky: History and the identity politics of the Chilean Mapuche.
- Bruce Randall Donald, professor of computer science, adjunct professor of chemistry and Edward and Joan Foley Fellow, Dartmouth College: Algorithms for structural proteomics.
- James Drake, artist, Santa Fe, New Mexico: Visual art.
- Andre Dubus III, writer, Newburyport, Massachusetts; lecturer in English, Tufts University: Fiction.
- Marcia Lea Due, photographer, Amenia, New York; adjunct assistant professor of photography, Purchase College, State University of New York: Photography.
- Thomas L. Dumm, professor of political science, Amherst College: Loneliness and experience.
- Patricia Ebrey, professor of history and international studies, University of Washington: The Song emperor Huizong and his China.
- Geoff Eley, Sylvia Thrupp Collegiate Professor of Comparative History, University of Michigan: The German Right from Bismarck to the present.
- William F. Fagan, assistant professor of biology, Arizona State University: The challenge of addressing key problems in conservation biology with weak data.
- Michael C. Ferris, professor of computer sciences and industrial engineering, University of Wisconsin–Madison: Optimization for medical applications.
- Steve Fiffer, writer, Evanston, Illinois: A biography of the spinal cord.
- Robbert Flick, photographer, Claremont, California; professor of art, University of Southern California: Photography.
- John J. Flynn, MacArthur Curator of Geology, Field Museum, and associate chairman, Committee on Evolutionary Biology, University of Chicago: The interplay of evolution and geologic change in South America.
- Nick Flynn, poet, Provincetown, Massachusetts: Poetry.
- Mark N. Franklin, John R. Reitemeyer Professor of International Politics, Trinity College, Hartford: The voter turnout puzzle.
- Tom Franklin, writer, Galesburg, Illinois; visiting writer-in-residence, Knox College: Fiction.
- Victoria Funari, film maker, Vallejo, California: Film making.
- John Ganim, professor of English, University of California, Riverside: Theories of the origins of medieval culture.
- Joe Gibbons, film maker, Malden, Massachusetts; Instructor in Film, School of the Museum of Fine Arts, Boston: Film making.
- Simon Gikandi, Robert Hayden Professor of English Language and Literature, University of Michigan: Pan-Africanism and culture, 1860–1960.
- Rebecca Gilman, playwright, Chicago: Play writing.
- Judy Glantzman, artist, New York City: Painting.
- Daniel S. Godfrey, composer, Syracuse, New York; professor of music, Syracuse University: Music composition.
- Aníbal González-Pérez, Edwin Erle Sparks Professor of Spanish, Pennsylvania State University: The new sentimental novel in Spanish America.
- Deborah M. Gordon, associate professor of biological sciences, Stanford University: The organization of work in ant colonies.
- Joanne Greenbaum, artist, New York City: Painting.
- Daniel A. Griffith, professor of geography, Syracuse University: Scientific visualization of spatial autocorrelation.
- Sally Gross, choreographer, New York City: Choreography.
- Jessica Hagedorn, writer, New York City: Fiction.
- Joseph Y. Halpern, professor of computer science, Cornell University: Decision-making in complex systems.
- Rebecca Harris-Warrick, associate professor of music, Cornell University: Dance in French opera during the ancien regime.
- Ehud Havazelet, writer, Corvallis, Oregon; associate professor and director, Program in Creative Writing, University of Oregon: Fiction.
- Christine Heindl, artist, Chauncey, Ohio; associate professor of art, Ohio University: Painting.
- Anne Higonnet, associate professor of art history, Wellesley College: A history of private art museums, 1848–1940.
- David Hilliard, photographer, West Roxbury, Massachusetts; member of the faculty in photography, School of the Museum of Fine Arts, Boston: Photography.
- Marianne Hirsch, professor of French and comparative literature, Dartmouth College: Czernowitz and the Holocaust.
- Philip T. Hoffman, professor of history and social science, California Institute of Technology: The role of crises in economic and financial development (in collaboration with Jean-Laurent Rosenthal).
- Joseph Horowitz, Independent Scholar, New York City: Music and the Gilded Age.
- Jim Isermann, artist, Santa Monica, California; adjunct professor of art, Occidental College: Visual art.
- Anil Kumar Jain, university distinguished professor, Michigan State University: The structure of multidimensional patterns.
- Roberto Juarez, artist, New York City: Painting.
- Mehran Kardar, professor of physics, Massachusetts Institute of Technology: Statistical physics and biological information.
- Ira Katznelson, Ruggles Professor of Political Science and History, Columbia University: Liberalism and the city.
- Webb Keane, associate professor of anthropology, University of Michigan: Missionaries, Protestants, and dilemmas of "modernity" in Indonesia.
- J. Gerald Kennedy, William A. Read Professor of English, Louisiana State University: Literary nationalism in the age of Poe.
- Dale Vivienne Kent, professor of history, University of California, Riverside: Patronage and patriarchy in early Medicean Florence.
- Todd Kontje, professor of German and comparative literature, University of California, San Diego: German orientalisms.
- Daniel W. Koontz, composer, Southampton, New York; adjunct associate professor of music, Southampton College: Music composition.
- Maryanne Kowaleski, professor of history and director, Center for Medieval Studies, Fordham University: An ethnography of maritime communities in medieval England.
- Matthew H. Kramer, fellow and director of studies in law, Churchill College and university reader in legal & political philosophy, University of Cambridge: An analysis of the ideal of negative liberty.
- Arthur J. Krener, professor of mathematics, University of California, Davis: Normal forms and bifurcation of control systems.
- Michael Kubovy, professor of psychology, University of Virginia: A new approach to human pleasure.
- Joan B. Landes, professor of women's studies and history, Pennsylvania State University: Artificial life in 18th-century France.
- Dorianne Laux, poet, Eugene, Oregon; associate professor of creative writing, University of Oregon: Poetry.
- Asunción Lavrin, professor of history, Arizona State University: Masculinity and the religious orders in colonial Mexico.
- Jocelyn Lee, photographer, Cape Elizabeth, Maine: Photography.
- Ricardo Llorca, composer, New York City; member of the faculty, The Juilliard School; member of the faculty, Spanish Institute, New York: Music composition.
- Sharon Lockhart, film maker and photographer, Los Angeles; associate professor of photography, University of Southern California: Film making.
- Elizabeth Lunbeck, associate professor of history, Princeton University: Psychoanalytic practice in the United States before 1920.
- Eva Lundsager, artist, New York City: Painting.
- Vera Lutter, artist, New York City: Visual art.
- Stephen Malawista, professor of medicine, Yale University: Studies of chemotaxis in human blood plasma.
- Mark Maroncelli, professor of chemistry, Pennsylvania State University: Computational studies of supercritical fluids.
- Beverly McIver, artist, Chandler, Arizona; assistant professor of painting and drawing, Arizona State University: Painting.
- Cindy McTee, composer, Denton, Texas; professor of music composition, University of North Texas: Music composition.
- Susan K. Mikota, veterinarian, Sumatra, Indonesia; Consultant, World Wildlife Foundation, Indonesia: A program for Sumatran elephant healthcare and conservation.
- Susan L. Mizruchi, professor of English and American studies, Boston University: American culture, economy, and the novel, 1860–1915.
- Toril Moi, James B. Duke Professor of Literature and Romance Studies, Duke University: Ibsen's modernity.
- Dilip Mookherjee, professor of economics and director, Institute of Economic Development, Boston University: Land reforms and fiscal decentralization in the economic development of West Bengal.
- Rachel Olivia Moore, independent scholar, New York City: A study of folklore on film.
- François M. Morel, professor of geosciences and director, Princeton Environmental Institute, Princeton University: The biological chemistry of sea water.
- Brian Morton, writer, New York City; member of the faculty in writing, Sarah Lawrence College; member of the adjunct faculty, graduate creative writing program, New York University: Fiction.
- John Mulvaney, artist, Philadelphia: Painting.
- Nalini M. Nadkarni, member of the faculty in tropical biology, Evergreen State College: The communication of forest-canopy research to nonscientists.
- Marilyn Nelson, poet, Storrs, Connecticut; professor of English, University of Connecticut: Poetry.
- Herbert Neuberger, professor of physics, Rutgers University: Chirality in nature.
- Richard E. Nisbett, Theodore M. Newcomb Distinguished University Professor of Psychology, University of Michigan: Eastern holism and Western analysis.
- Jacki Ochs (Bio), film maker, New York City; assistant professor of film, Purchase College, State University of New York: Film making.
- Raymond J. O'Connor, professor of wildlife ecology, University of Maine: The practice of ecology.
- Julio M. Ottino, R. R. McCormick Institute Professor and Walter P. Murphy Professor, Northwestern University: Dynamics and self-organization in granular media.
- George Packer, member of the core faculty in writing, Bennington College; member of the visiting faculty in writing, Sarah Lawrence College: The human face of globalization.
- Geoffrey Parker, Andreas Dorpalen Professor of History, Ohio State University: The world crisis, 1635–1665.
- Cliffton Peacock, artist, Charleston, South Carolina; associate professor of painting and drawing, College of Charleston: Painting.
- Robert J. Penella, professor of classics, Fordham University: A study and translation of the orations of Himerius.
- Wyatt Prunty, poet, Sewanee, Tennessee; Carlton Professor of English and director, Sewanee Writers' Conference, University of the South: Poetry.
- Kevin Matthew Puts, composer, Austin, Texas; assistant professor of composition, University of Texas at Austin: Music composition.
- Ronald T. Raines, professor of biochemistry and chemistry, University of Wisconsin–Madison: Automated protein assembly to mine the human genome.
- Sumathi Ramaswamy, associate professor of history, University of Michigan: Maps and modernity in India.
- Amy G. Remensnyder, associate professor of history, Brown University: Conquest, conversion, and the Virgin Mary in medieval Spain and Spanish colonial America.
- Joan L. Richards, associate professor of history, Brown University: Mathematics and spirit in the world of Augustus and Sophia DeMorgan.
- John Richardson, contributing editor, Vanity Fair; International Consultant in 20th Century Art, Dickinson Roundell, New York: A life of Picasso, 1917–1939.
- Katherine Wentworth Rinne, associate fellow, Institute for Advanced Technology in the Humanities, University of Virginia and visiting professor of landscape architecture, The Iowa State University: The waters of the city of Rome.
- David Rivard, poet, Cambridge, Massachusetts; lecturer in English, Tufts University: Poetry.
- Anne Charlotte M. Robertson, film maker, Framingham, Massachusetts: Film making.
- George D. Rose, professor of biophysics and biophysical chemistry, Johns Hopkins University: The physical basis of protein structure.
- Jean-Laurent Rosenthal, professor of economics, University of California, Los Angeles: The role of crises in economic and financial development (in collaboration with Philip T. Hoffman).
- Cynthia Rosenzweig, senior research scientist, Earth Institute, Columbia University: The impacts of major systems of climate variability on world food security.
- Andrew Ross, professor of American studies, New York University: Work and play in the new economy.
- Janice L. Ross, lecturer in dance history, Stanford University: Anna Halprin and avant-garde dance.
- Margaret Russett, associate professor of English and director of undergraduate studies, University of Southern California: Literature and abstraction in early 19th-century Britain.
- Marie-Laure Ryan (email), independent scholar, Bellvue, Colorado: Literary cartography.
- Joe Sacco, comic-book journalist, Sunnyside, New York: Comic-book journalism.
- Frederick Schauer, Frank Stanton Professor of the First Amendment and Academic Dean, John F. Kennedy School of Government, Harvard University: Generality and justice.
- Paul L. Schechter, William A. M. Burden Professor of Astrophysics, Massachusetts Institute of Technology: Studies in the microlensing of quasar lightcurves.
- Stephen A. Scheer, photographer, Athens, Georgia; associate professor of photography, University of Georgia: Photography.
- Hilary M. Schor, professor of English and gender studies, University of Southern California: Women, fiction, and the subject of realism.
- Sarah Schulman, playwright, New York City; assistant professor of English, City University of New York, College of Staten Island: Play writing.
- Freydoon Shahidi, professor of mathematics, Purdue University: New instances of functoriality.
- William Sheehan, psychiatrist and Historian of Astronomy, Willmar, Minnesota: The structure and evolution of the galaxy.
- Shen Wei, choreographer, New York City; artistic director, Shen Wei Dance Arts: Choreography.
- Daniel J. Sherman, professor of French studies and history, Rice University: The French and their "Others", 1945–1975.
- Amy Sillman, artist, Brooklyn, New York; visiting assistant professor of painting, Bard College: Painting.
- Larry Silver, James and Nan Farquhar Professor of History of Art, University of Pennsylvania: The rise of visual genres in the Antwerp art market.
- Taryn Simon, photographer, New York City: Photography.
- Yuri Slezkine, professor of history, University of California, Berkeley: Moscow's house of government, 1928–1938.
- Bruce R. Smith, professor of English, Georgetown University: Essays in historical phenomenology.
- Mike Smith, photographer, Johnson City, Tennessee; professor of art, East Tennessee State University: Photography.
- Deborah Solomon, writer, New York City: A biography of Norman Rockwell.
- Abigail Solomon-Godeau, professor of history of art and architecture, University of California, Santa Barbara: Gender, genre, and the female nude in France.
- Lynette Spillman, professor of sociology, University of Notre Dame: Cultural dimensions of retail market exchange.
- Justin Spring, writer and scholar, New York City: A cultural history of Provincetown.
- Nancy Shatzman Steinhardt, professor of East Asian art and curator of Chinese art, University of Pennsylvania: Chinese architecture of the 4th to 6th centuries.
- Jeffrey Stock, composer, Dix Hills, New York: Music composition.
- Richard S. Street, photographer and historian, San Anselmo, California: Photography and the farm-worker experience in California, 1850–2000.
- Donald M. G. Sutherland, professor of history, University of Maryland, College Park: The French agricultural revolution, 1660–1914.
- Peter Temin, Elisha Gray II Professor of Economics, Massachusetts Institute of Technology: Market economy in the early Roman empire.
- Karen K. Uhlenbeck, professor and Sid W. Richardson Foundation Regents Chair in Mathematics, University of Texas at Austin: A geometric approach to soliton and wave equations.
- Gunther Uhlmann, professor of mathematics, University of Washington: Inverse boundary problems.
- Dale J. Van Harlingen, professor of physics, University of Illinois at Urbana-Champaign: Phase coherence and dynamics in superconducting circuits.
- David T. Van Zanten, professor of art history, Northwestern University: The architect's contribution to the shaping of European cities in the 1840s and 1850s.
- Paul E. Walker, visiting scholar, Center for Middle Eastern Studies, University of Chicago: A study of the caliph al-Hakim.
- Richard A. Walker, professor of geography and chairman, California Studies Center, University of California, Berkeley; chairman, California Studies Association: The urban experience of San Francisco, 1950–2000.
- Jim C. H. Wang, Mabel D. Clark Distinguished Professor of Chemistry, University of Nebraska–Lincoln: Laser spectroscopy of polymeric liquids.
- Charles Harper Webb, poet, Glendale, California; professor of English, California State University, Long Beach: Poetry.
- Michael V. Wedin, professor of philosophy, University of California, Davis: Perception, change, and noncontradiction in Aristotle's Metaphysics.
- Monte Westerfield, professor of biology, University of Oregon: Mechanisms that regulate patterning of the anterior central nervous system.
- Alan Wiener, artist, Brooklyn, New York: Sculpture.
- Ruth J. Williams, professor of mathematics, University of California, San Diego: Mathematical theory for stochastic networks.
- Kathleen Wilson, associate professor of history, State University of New York at Stony Brook: Theatre, culture, and modernity in the English provinces, 1720–1820.
- Leigh Witchel, choreographer, New York City; artistic director, Dance as Ever: Choreography.
- Kazuo Yamaguchi, professor of sociology and faculty research associate, Alfred P. Sloan Working Family Center, University of Chicago: Statistical and behavioral modeling of family processes.
- Susan Youens, professor of musicology, University of Notre Dame: The social history of the lied.
- Arlene Zallman, composer, Wellesley, Massachusetts; professor of music composition and theory, Wellesley College: Music composition.
- Nadine Zanow, artist, Boston; assistant professor of studio art, Brandeis University: Painting.

== Latin American and Caribbean Fellows ==
- Ignacio Baca-Lobera, composer, Querétaro, Mexico; professor of music composition, Autonomous University of Querétaro: Music composition.
- Carlos L. Ballaré, senior research scientist, National Research Council of Argentina (CONICET); courtesy associate professor of agronomy, University of Buenos Aires: Functional aspects of the impacts of solar ultraviolet radiation on plant-insect interactions.
- Graciela Lina Boente Boente, professor of mathematics, University of Buenos Aires; independent researcher, National Research Council of Argentina (CONICET): Robust and nonparametric inference.
- Alicia Borinsky, writer, Newton, Massachusetts; professor of Latin American and comparative literature, Boston University: Fiction.
- Alfredo Cáceres, principal investigator, National Research Council of Argentina (CONICET): Kinesin-like protein functions during neuronal polarization.
- Sergio Chejfec, writer, Caracas, Venezuela; editor-in-chief, Nueva Sociedad, Caracas: Fiction.
- Eduardo Coutinho, film maker, Rio de Janeiro, Brazil; Consultant, Centro de Criação de Imagem Popular (CECIP), Rio de Janeiro: Film making.
- Christian Cravo, photographer, Salvador, Bahia, Brazil: Photography.
- Leticia Fernanda Cugliandolo, assistant professor of theoretical physics, École Normale Supérieure, Paris, France: Quantum disordered systems and optimization problems.
- Gerardo Deniz (Juan Almela), poet, Mexico City: Poetry.
- Javier A. Escobal, senior researcher, Grupo de Análisis para el Desarrollo (GRADE), Lima, Peru: The links between rural producers and markets.
- Alejandro Fainstein, staff researcher, Atomic Energy Commission and National Research Council of Argentina (CONICET); assistant professor of physics, Instituto Balseiro, Bariloche, Argentina: Optically confined spectroscopy of nanostructures.
- Ana Fernández Garay, associate researcher, National Research Council of Argentina (CONICET); professor of linguistics, National University of La Pampa, Argentina: An edition of the testimonies of the last Ranquels.
- Sérgio T. Ferreira, professor of biochemistry, Federal University of Rio de Janeiro: Protein misfolding and aggregation in human amyloid diseases.
- Alberto Carlos Frasch, researcher, National Research Council of Argentina (CONICET): Regulation of mucin expression in trypanosoma cruzi.
- Juan Eduardo García-Huidobro, consultant and professor, Ministry of Education, Santiago, Chile: Public policies to achieve equity in education.
- José Hernandez-Claire, photographer, Guadalajara, Mexico; curator, "Manuel Alvarez Bravo Gallery", University of Guadalajara: Photography.
- Hugo Hopenhayn, professor of economics, Universidad Torcuato Di Tella, Buenos Aires; associate professor of economics, University of Rochester: Topics in social insurance.
- Ricardo Lanzarini, artist, Montevideo, Uruguay: Drawing.
- Jorge Lauret, assistant professor of mathematics, National University of Córdoba; assistant researcher, National Research Council of Argentina (CONICET): Studies in differential geometry.
- Annette Leibing, anthropologist, Rio de Janeiro; professor of mental health, Federal University of Rio de Janeiro: Aging and homelessness in Rio de Janeiro.
- Jac Leirner, artist, São Paulo, Brazil: Visual art.
- Paula Luttringer, photographer, Buenos Aires, Argentina; assistant director, Galatée Films, Argentina, Chile, and Peru: Photography.
- Jorge Macchi, artist, Buenos Aires, Argentina: Visual art.
- Rachel Manley, writer, Toronto, Canada: A biography of Edna Manley.
- Claudio Mercado Muñoz, coordinator of audiovisual department, Chilean Museum of Pre-Columbian Art, Santiago: Bailes chinos and prehispanic memory in central Chile.
- Tomás Moulian Emparanza, director, Instituto Formación Social Paulo Freire, Santiago, Chile: Intellectuals and politics in Chile, 1958–1970.
- Pablo E. Navarro, professor of philosophy of law, Universidad Nacional del Sur, Bahía Blanca, Argentina; researcher, National Research Council of Argentina (CONICET): Normative relevance and justification of institutional decisions.
- Hans W. Niemeyer Fernandez, archaeologist, Santiago, Chile: The rock paintings of El Médano.
- Oscar Oiwa, artist, Tokyo, Japan: Visual art.
- Pedro L. Oliveira, associate professor of medical biochemistry, Federal University of Rio de Janeiro: Biological defenses against heme toxicity.
- Alejandro César Olivieri, professor of analytical chemistry, University of Rosario, Argentina; research fellow, National Research Council of Argentina (CONICET): The development of analytical methods for biomedical samples.
- Hilda Paredes, composer, Mexico City and London: Music composition.
- Eduardo Antonio Parra, writer, Mexico City: Fiction.
- Antonio Arnoni Prado, professor of literary theory, State University of Campinas, São Paulo, Brazil: A comparative study of the critical thought of Sérgio Buarque de Holanda and Manuel de Oliveira Lima.
- María Cristina Redondo, senior researcher, National Research Council of Argentina (CONICET): An inquiry into the practical authority of law.
- Silvia Rivas, Video Installation Artist, Buenos Aires, Argentina: Video installation art.
- Mercedes Roffé, poet, New York City: Poetry.
- Tulio Rojas Curieux, professor of anthropology and ethnolinguistics, and director, Colombian Center for the Study of Aborigenes Languages (CCELA), University of the Andes, Bogotá: Analysis of complex sentences in Nasa Yuwe.
- María Teresa Ruiz, professor of astronomy, University of Chile: The oldest stars.
- Guillermo Saavedra, poet, Buenos Aires, Argentina; Editor, La Nación, Buenos Aires: Poetry.
- Francisco V. Sepulveda, professor of physiology, Center for Scientific Studies, Valdivia, Chile: Molecular identification and regulation of the potassium channel in cell volume control.
- Sol Serrano, associate professor of history, Catholic University of Chile: Catholicism and secularization in 19th-century Chile.
- Jorge Daniel Tartarini, associate researcher, National Research Council of Argentina (CONICET): The architecture of the Argentine railroads.
- Ana Maria Tavares, artist, São Paulo: Visual art.
- Alejandro Tortolero Villaseñor, professor of history, Metropolitan Autonomous University, Iztapalapa, Mexico: Land, society, and ecology in the economy of Mexico, 1780–1940.
- Maurice Vaneau, theatre artist, São Paulo, Brazil: Theatre arts.
- Trajano Augusto Ricca Vieira, professor of Greek language and literature, State University of Campinas, São Paulo, Brazil: Translation of The Bacchantes by Euripides.

== See also ==
- Guggenheim Fellowship
