= Katherine Cook =

Katherine or Katharine Cook may refer to:

- Katharine Cook (1863–1938), British medical missionary in Uganda
- Katharine Cook Briggs (1875–1968), née Cook, co-creator, with her daughter Isabel Briggs Myers, of an inventory of personality type known as the Myers–Briggs Type Indicator
- Katherine M. Cook (1876–1962), American educator and government official

== See also ==
- Catherine Cooke (disambiguation)
- Kate Cook (disambiguation)
