= Bessie Dewar =

American judge (born 1980)

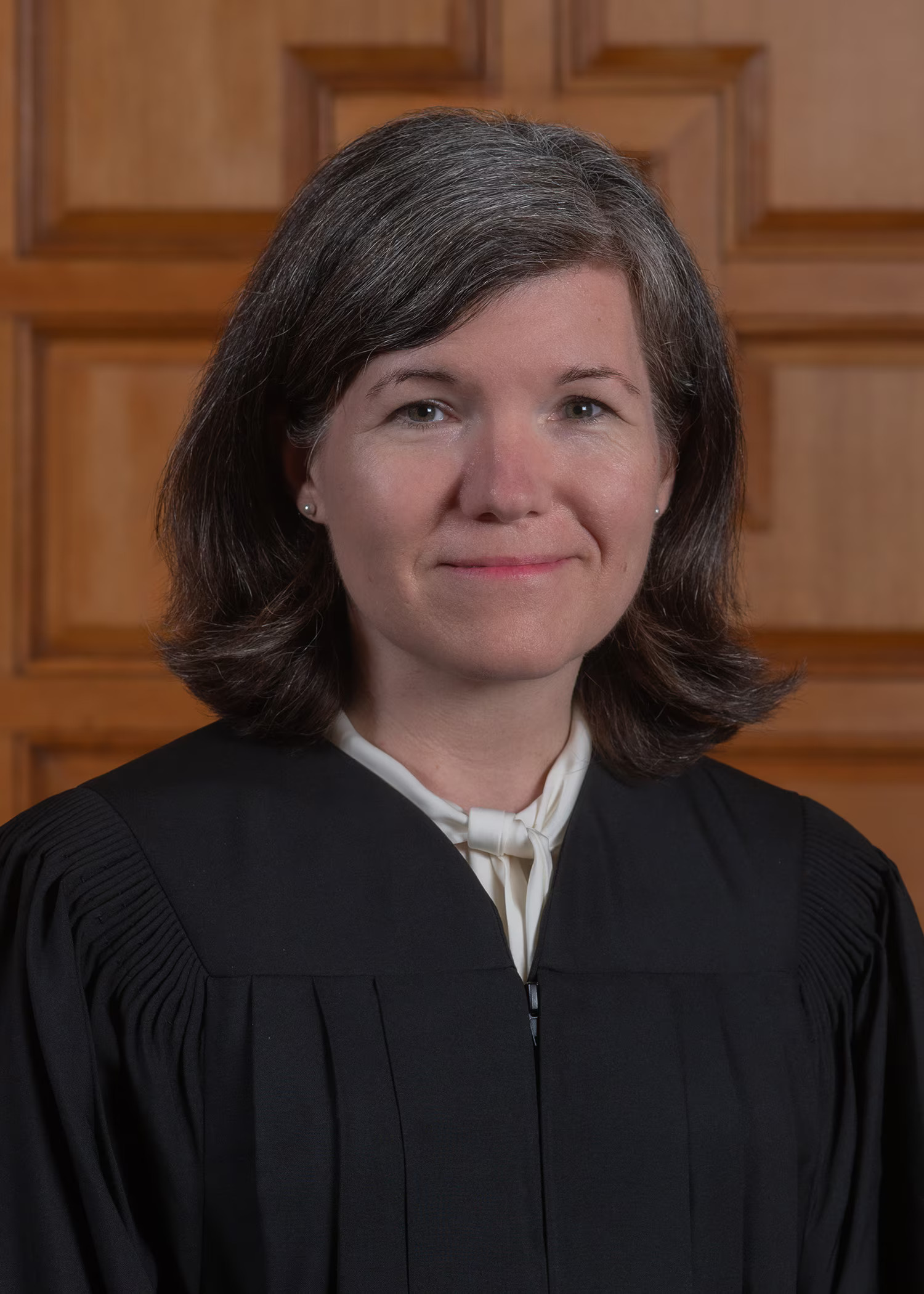

Associate Justice of the Massachusetts Supreme Judicial Court
- Incumbent
- Assumed office January 16, 2024
- Appointed by: Maura Healey
- Preceded by: Elspeth B. Cypher

Attorney General of Massachusetts
- Acting
- In office January 5, 2023 – January 18, 2023
- Governor: Maura Healey
- Preceded by: Kate R. Cook (acting)
- Succeeded by: Andrea Campbell

Personal details
- Born: July 4, 1980 (age 45)
- Party: Democratic
- Education: Harvard University (BA); Pembroke College, Cambridge (MPhil); Yale University (JD)

Elizabeth Napier "Bessie" Dewar (born July 4, 1980) is an American lawyer who has served as an associate justice of the Massachusetts Supreme Judicial Court since 2024. She previously served as the state solicitor of Massachusetts from 2016 to 2024. Prior to serving as the state solicitor, she had served as the assistant state solicitor under former state solicitor Peter Sacks.

== Education ==
Dewar graduated from Harvard University with a Bachelor of Arts degree. She then received a Master of Philosophy degree from Pembroke College, Cambridge and earned her Juris Doctor from Yale University. After law school, Dewar served as a law clerk at all three levels of the federal judiciary, starting with Louis H. Pollak of the United States District Court for the Eastern District of Pennsylvania, then William A. Fletcher of the United States Court of Appeals for the Ninth Circuit and finally Stephen Breyer of the Supreme Court of the United States.

== Career ==
Dewar joined Ropes & Gray LLP working as an appellate and trial-level lawyer. She then became a civil rights advocate at the Public Interest Law Center in Philadelphia.

Dewar served as the state solicitor of Massachusetts from 2016 to 2024. She was appointed to the position on November 28, 2016 by Massachusetts Attorney General Maura Healey. Prior to serving as the state solicitor, Dewar had served as the assistant state solicitor under former state solicitor Peter Sacks.

Dewar served as the acting attorney general of Massachusetts after Maura Healey was sworn in as the Governor of Massachusetts at noon on January 5, 2023, taking the helm of the Massachusetts Attorney General’s Office from Kate R. Cook, until Andrea Campbell was sworn in on January 18, 2023.

On December 8, 2023 Governor Maura Healey nominated Dewar to a seat on the Massachusetts Supreme Judicial Court to fill the vacancy left by the retitrement of Justice Elspeth B. Cypher. A hearing on her nomination was held later that month and she was confirmed unanimously by the Massachusetts Governor's Council on January 10, 2024. She was sworn in on January 16, 2024.

=== Notable cases ===
While working in the Massachusetts Attorney General’s Office, Dewar secured a $3.5 million settlement from Aspen Dental, which was accused of deceptive advertising claims.

== Personal life ==
Dewar is the mother of two children.

Legal offices
Preceded by Kate R. Cook; Acting	Attorney General of Massachusetts; Acting; 2023	Succeeded by Andrea Campbell
Preceded by Elspeth B. Cypher	Associate Justice of the Massachusetts Supreme Judicial Court; 2024–present	Incumbent
