= Catherine Cooke (disambiguation) =

Catherine Cooke (1942–2004) was an architect.

Catherine Cooke or Cook may also refer to:

- Lady Catherine Killigrew (died 1583), born Lady Catherine Cooke
- David and Catherine Cook

== See also ==
- Kathy Smallwood-Cook (born 1960) (maiden name Kathryn Cook), British sprinter
- Kathy Cook (journalist), Canadian journalist and non-fiction writer
- Cathy Cooke (fl. 1989–1990), English cricketer
- Cathy Cook (born 1955), American filmmaker
- Kate Cook (disambiguation)
- Katherine Cook (disambiguation)
