= Boente =

Boente is a surname. It is the surname of:

- Dana Boente (born 1954), American attorney
- Graciela Boente, Argentine mathematician
- Alexis Boente, American news reporter for WVEA-TV
- Bernd Boente, manager of Ukrainian boxer Wladimir Klitschko

== See also ==
- Boente, a parish in the Spanish municipality of Arzúa
