= Jocelyn Lee =

Jocelyn Lee may refer to:

- Jocelyn Lee (artist)
- Jocelyn Lee (actress)

== See also ==
- Jocelyn Lee Hardy, British Army officer
