= Roberto Juárez =

Roberto Juárez or Juarez may refer to:

- Roberto Carlos Juárez (born 1984), Mexican footballer
- Roberto Juarez (artist) (born 1952), American visual artist
