= Kate Cook =

Kate or Katie Cook may refer to:

- Kate Cook (singer), Australian country singer
- Kate R. Cook, American lawyer and government official
- Katie Cook (writer) (born 1981), American comic artist and writer
- Katie Higgins Cook born 1986), American aviator and officer

== See also ==
- Catherine Cooke (disambiguation)
- Katherine Cook
