= Mark Maroncelli =

American chemist

Mark Maroncelli (born December 1957) is an American chemist, currently serving as professor of chemistry at the Pennsylvania State University, where he also coordinates the Chemistry Department's undergraduate program.

== Career ==
Mark received a B.S. degree in chemistry from Williams College (1979) and a Ph.D. degree in physical chemistry from the University of California, Berkeley (1983). He spent the next four years as a postdoctoral researcher at two institutions, Oregon State University (1984–1985) with Prof. Joseph W. Nibler and the University of Chicago (1985–1987) with Prof. Graham R. Fleming.

In 1987 Mark received his first academic appointment, as assistant professor at the Pennsylvania State University (1987–1993). In 1993 he was appointed associate professor, and in 1997 he was made a full professor.

== Research ==
Prof. Maroncelli's research interests include solvation and solvent effects on chemical reaction, liquid-phase dynamics, electron and proton transfer reactions, supercritical fluids and expanded liquids, ionic liquids, ultrafast spectroscopy, and computer simulation.

Maroncelli’s research seeks to develop a fundamental understanding of the molecular nature of solvation and how it affects chemical reactions taking place in solution. Solvation involves the interactions between dissolved molecules (solutes) and molecules of the solvent. Favorable arrangements of solvent molecules around the solute lower its energy, which leads to dissolution. The interactions involved are typically very rapid, taking place in as short a time as 1 ps (10^-12 s). Because the key steps in most chemical reactions also occur on these fast time scales, time-dependent aspects of solvation partly determine how a solvent influences the rate and course of chemical reactions. Maroncelli uses ultrafast spectroscopic techniques in combination with modern computational-chemistry methods to observe, analyze, and predict the solvation process and its impact on the chemical steps that occur during the particular reaction being investigated.

Maroncelli’s recent research has explored the nature of solvation in novel solvents such as supercritical fluids, gas-expanded liquids, and ionic liquids. Comparing model reactions such as isomerization, electron transfer, and proton transfer in these novel solvents with such reactions in conventional liquids enables his research team to test and extend the current understanding of solvent-reaction coupling. These studies have potential applications in technical chemistry, synthetic chemistry, and cell biology.

== Awards and honors ==
- Joel Henry Hildebrand Award, 2015,
- Humboldt Research Award, 2009
- Fellow of the American Association for the Advancement of Science, 2008
- Visiting Faculty Member, University of Kyoto, August – November 2005
- Guggenheim Fellow, 2001-2002
