= Silvia Rivas =

Argentine visual artist

- Born: 23 April 1957 (age 69); Argentina
- Occupations: Visual artist, video artist, installation artist

Silvia Rivas (Buenos Aires, Argentina, 1957) is an Argentine visual artist known for her multi-channel video installations. In Latin America she is considered a precursor in the area of expanded video. Her work is characterized by the crossing of materialities and technologies in which she uses both electronic devices and ancestral techniques. Her production is organized in thematic series of video installations, drawings, photographs or objects. Interested in revealing the metaphorical power of different materialities, she uses the electronic medium and the moving image to record stillness, the imminent and the subjective perception of time.

Among other distinctions, in 2001 she received the Guggenheim Fellowship and the Konex Award, diploma of merit for the five-year period 1997–2001 and, in 2002, the Argentine Video Award at the Art Biennial of the National Museum of Fine Arts; in 2005, the video post-production residency grant from the Wexner Center for the Arts, Columbus, Ohio. In 2006 and 2007, she was awarded third and second prize, respectively, at the Salón Nacional de Artes Visuales in New Media and Installations. In 2012 he received again, the Konex Award diploma to the merit corresponding to the decade 2002–2012.

She has represented Argentina in the Mercosur Biennial, Porto Alegre, 3rd and 5th editions, in the 8th Havana Biennial, and in Bienalsur 2019.

Her work is part of national and international collections, both public and private. Among them the Museo Nacional Centro de Arte Reina Sofía, Museo de Arte Latinoamericano de Buenos Aires, Buenos Aires Museum of Modern Art.

== Biography ==
In 1981 she graduates from the National School of Fine Arts "Prilidiano Pueyrredón" with a specialty in sculpture. At the same time, she trained with Kenneth Kemble, in whose workshop she worked as a drawing teacher, and with Víctor Grippo, whom she considers her main reference and with whom she reflects on materials and the power contained in them.

In her beginnings she made paintings, drawings and objects, supports with which she would work throughout her career. In these works, Rivas incorporates diverse techniques and materials, such as photographic emulsion on stainless steel plates, interventions with resin, natural elements, glass and graphite. During this period, the circulation circuit of contemporary art in Buenos Aires was still dominated by the division into traditional disciplines, making his objects difficult to classify.

From 1990 onwards, she incorporated video as an expressive medium to address the theme of time with greater precision. Her concerns about time and the human dimension lead her to problematize the medium and she begins to make audiovisual installations. In an interview the artist states:

"The moving image started to become necessary to me around 1998, when I was working on a series of works on paper and steel with the idea of pointing out, through the image, a double characteristic of time: that of leaving traces and erasing them in the same action. I was interested in how this property operates on memory and objects."

Cuentas de vidrio, one of his first video installations, participates in the International Video Art show, at the Museo Nacional de Bellas Artes in 1990, where he will later hold a solo exhibition of his objects. In 2000, he received a Guggenheim Fellowship with the project Notas sobre el tiempo (Notes on Time), which allowed him to mount a twelve-channel video installation at the Cronopios hall of the Centro Cultural Recoleta in Buenos Aires in 2001, in the midst of the institutional explosion in Argentina. This exhibition, in which he conveys the urgency and cacophony of the social climate, is considered a turning point in his production. In an introductory text to Rivas' work, Eugenio Viola refers:

"Since 2001, Silvia Rivas has developed an evident interest in time-based practices, which includes the relationship between video, the body, and the environment, as well as strategies related to the field of so-called "delegated performance", with all that it may imply for post-produced video. Over the years, Rivas has explored the characteristics of the state-of-the-art video technologies of the time and has developed a personal video-approach that makes extensive use of slow motion, extended playback, and accelerated sequence effects to investigate time and space. Looking at Rivas's work with hindsight, there is no doubt that she is a pioneer of experimentation with the "expanded" possibilities of video, in its qualities for both installation and ambience, and not only in Argentina, but also within the broader context of Latin America."

During the economic and social crisis in Argentina, Rivas produces the work Llenos de esperanza in which the social problems can be read metaphorically from an existential point of view. The political commitment of the work is aligned with the premise of the 8th Havana Biennial, in which he participates in 2003. For this same work he received the Argentine Video Award at the Biennial of Art, National Museum of Fine Arts.

In 2004 he mounted Todo lo de afuera at the Buenos Aires Museum of Modern Art. Recording the action of a group of adolescents at risk. The work explores the link between the subject, its relationship with the environment and with the other. At the same time, Rivas makes a series of portraits of young people taken as archetypes and returns to the theme of landscape in Pequeño acontecimiento-Paisaje a definir. The Río de la Plata and the horizon of the plains are shown as a poetic analogy to Argentine identity and history.

In 2010, he presents Zumbido in the Contemporary Program of the Museo de Arte Latinoamericano de Buenos Aires, with large projections and surround sound. This series deals with the condemnation to permanent action through scenes in which a woman and a swarm of flies interact. In 2014 he manages to exhibit the complete series at the Museo Municipal de Bellas Artes Juan B. Castagnino in the city of Rosario, Argentina, generating a journey through several rooms, in which obsessive actions and rhythms follow one another. The set of drawings Odisea Invisible closes the tour. That same year, under this title, he made an intervention with graphite on the walls of Fundación Proa.

In the following period, simultaneously with the filming of Momentum, she made small installations or assemblages with video, treating the landscape as an imaginary and artifice of Paradise. An example is the work of the artist: Igual el paraíso es nuestro.

With a high-speed camera to achieve defined images of minimal instants, she records the performances for her series Momentum. Pieces from this series that include materials such as Carrara marble or porcelain, were shown in the exhibition Migraciones en el Arte contemporáneo at MUNTREF in the 2019 edition of Bienalsur and at RolfArt.

In 2018's Fuerza Diagonal moves from subjective perception to a group perspective. The title of this series is inspired by Hannah Arendt's eponymous concept and refers to action with the other as a transformative possibility.

She lives and works in Buenos Aires. She is represented by the galleries: RolfArt, Buenos Aires; and Diana Lowenstein, Miami.

== Work ==
Materials and their physical particularities occupy a prominent place in the work of Silvia Rivas traveling through different supports according to their metaphorical potential. She investigates the states of being, the condition of man as such. In the artist's vision, internally the subject only finds his power in an attitude of tenacious and constant resistance, firmly taken to his present.

Since the nineties she has incorporated video and performance, spatially mounted, as a central medium in her artistic production. Interested in her ability to capture visual ideas rooted in time. Rivas' works explore situations where time materializes as an unavoidable presence. Her aesthetic questions the viewer, invites him to immerse himself in a universe of more or less constant realities, confronting him through her video installations with unfathomable dimensions of spatiality and temporality.

In the words of Rodrigo Alonso:

"His work also manifests a political commitment to each context of production and exhibition. In 2001 the economic, social and political crisis of the country changed the physiognomy of the environment. Its impact on people leaves painful traces, both for those who suffer it and for those who witness its atrocious consequences. In this context, the actions of the characters that populate Silvia Rivas' videos become less and less abstract."

Although Rivas often tries to relativize historical imprints in order to project her works towards the philosophical terrain, as the creative interrelationship progresses, some contexts begin to emerge that anchor the works definitively to a more defined community and/or epochal environment.

The protagonism that the body is acquiring as the axis of some existential conflicts are becoming flesh when Rivas begins to work with performers, who, being taken as archetypes, provide a concrete and situated corporeality, as seen in Todo lo de Afuera (2004) or Fuerza diagonal (2018).

In Zumbido (2010) he exacerbates the power of metaphor in that, he does not portray any existing reality outside the electronic framework. The flies represent something beyond them.

With the title Pequeños paraísos ensamblados (2015), Rivas develops a series of small video installations, depicting lush scenes of nature, even including small fans to further enhance the scenes of trees and greenery. The intention was to offer a stark contrast to the persistent urban views of buildings, sidewalks and asphalt, and offer a way to balance those large spaces with an intimate, natural oasis as a momentary escape from the usual backdrop of the city and personal electronic distractions.

The existential – and even metaphysical – concern deepens in the immediately subsequent works, when the human figure reappears as the guiding thread of poetic reflection: Momentum (2017), Fuerza diagonal (2018).

== Exhibitions ==
=== Selected solo shows ===
2019

- Diagonal Force, Rolf Art, Buenos Aires, Argentina.

2015

- Momentum, Rolf Art, Buenos Aires, Argentina.
- Still Paradise is Ours, Diana Lowenstein Gallery, Miami, Florida, United States.

2014

- Buzzing / Invisible Odyssey, Museo Municipal de Bellas Artes Juan B. Castagnino, Rosario, Santa Fe, Argentina.

2010

- Buzzing. Contemporary 26, Museo de Arte Latinoamericano de Buenos Aires, Buenos Aires, Argentina.

2004

- Everything Out There, Museo de Arte Moderno de Buenos Aires, Buenos Aires, Argentina.

2003

- Nocturnal, Diana Lowenstein Gallery, Miami, Florida, United States.

2001

- Notes on Time. Time as scenario, Centro Cultural Recoleta, Buenos Aires, Argentina.
- Notes on Time, Diana Lowenstein Gallery, Miami, Florida, United States.

1998

- Marks of Time – Image and Likeness, Galería Der Brücke, Buenos Aires, Argentina.
- Silvia Rivas, Museo Nacional de Bellas Artes, Buenos Aires, Argentina.

1996

- Marks of Time, Joan Prats Gallery, New York City, United States.
- Marcas del tiempo. Obra sobre papel y metal. Galería Joan Prats, New York, United States.

1995

- Silvia Rivas, Galería Der Brücke, Buenos Aires, Argentina.

1993

- Silvia Rivas, Casa da Parra, Santiago de Compostela, Spain.

1989

- Paintings, TEMA Galería de Arte, Buenos Aires, Argentina.

=== Selection group shows ===
2020

- I want to be with you, Museo de Arte Moderno de Bogotá, Bogotá, Colombia.

2019

- After the future. Images to recompose the relationship society/nature, South Biennial 2019, National Museum of Fine Arts of Neuquén, Argentina.

2017

- Nature. Man's Refuge and Resource, Kirchner Cultural Center, Buenos Aires, Argentina.

2016

- The museum of imaginary worlds, Recoleta Cultural Center, Buenos Aires, Argentina.
- Paisaje, el devenir de una idea (Two hundred years: past, present and future), Kirchner Cultural Center, Buenos Aires, Argentina.

2015

- Migrations in Contemporary Art, Centro de Arte Contemporáneo Hotel de Inmigrantes, Buenos Aires, Argentina.

2014

- The Museum of Imaginary Worlds, Museum of Contemporary Art, Mar del Plata, province of Buenos Aires, Argentina.
- Between times, Presences of the Jozami Collection at the Lázaro Galdiano Museum, Lázaro Galdiano Museum, Madrid, Spain.
- The Victors and the Vanquished, Museo de Arte Moderno de Buenos Aires, Buenos Aires, Argentina.

2011

- Contemporary Argentine Art in the MALBA Collection. Works 1989–2010, Museo de Arte Latinoamericano de Buenos Aires, Buenos Aires, Argentina.

2010

- Realidad y utopía. 200 años de arte argentino: una visión desde el presente, Akademie der Künste (Pariser Platz), Berlin, Germany.

2009

- Argentina hoy, Centro Cultural Banco do Brasil, San Pablo; Centro Cultural Banco do Brasil, Río de Janeiro, Brazil.

2005

- 5ª Bienal Del Mercosur, Porto Alegre, Brazil.
- Argentina bajo la línea del horizonte (en colaboración con Carlos Trilnick), Estudio Abierto Puerto, Buenos Aires, Argentina.
- XV Videobrasil, Asociación Cultural Videobrasil, San Pablo, Brazil.
- Fokus Südamerika, Kunst Film Biennale, Kino in der Brücke / Kölnischer Kunstverein, Köln, Germany.

2003

- Bienal de La Habana, Centro de Arte Contemporáneo Wilfredo Lam, La Habana, Cuba.

2002

- Últimas tendencias en la Colección del MAMbA, Museo de Arte Moderno de Buenos Aires (MAMbA), Buenos Aires, Argentina.

2001

- 3ª Bienal del Mercosur, Porto Alegre, Brazil.

1993

- Instalaciones, Museo Nacional de Bellas Artes, Buenos Aires, Argentina.

1990

- Videoarte Internacional, Museo Nacional de Bellas Artes, Buenos Aires, Argentina.
- Artistas de Buenos Aires (Centro de Arte y Comunicación, Museo de Arte Moderno, Ciudad de México, México; Museo de la Tertulia, Cali, Colombia; Museu de Arte de São Paulo, San Pablo, Brazil.

== Awards ==
Selection
Year	Awards / Fellowships / Honors
2012	Konex Merit Diploma in Video-art. 2002/2012 decade.
2007	Second Prize Salón Nacional de Artes Visuales. Nuevos Soportes e Instalaciones. Buenos Aires.
2006	Third Prize Salón Nacional de Artes Visuales. Nuevos Soportes e Instalaciones. Buenos Aires. Faena Prize, El Porteño Art District. Collective Project Argentina es afuera, in collaboration with Inés Sanguinetti and Gabriel Espinosa.
2005	Wexner Center for the Arts Post Production Residence, Columbus (Ohio), EE.UU. Jury Mention. Salón Nacional de Artes Visuales.
2002	Konex Merit Diploma. Mixed Media 1997–2001 period. Fundación Konex, Buenos Aires. Leonardo Prize. Digital video. Museo Nacional de Bellas Artes, Buenos Aires. Argentine Video Prize. Museo Nacional de Bellas Artes, Buenos Aires. Visual Art Prize, 2001 edition. Asociación Argentina de Críticos de Arte, Buenos Aires
2001	John Simon Guggenheim Memorial Foundation Fellowship. Video-installation Art. Argentine Digital Art Prize. I Buenos Aires International Art Biennal. Museo Nacional de Bellas Artes.
1991	Ciudad de México Fellowship.

== Bibliography and publications ==
- Alonso, Rodrigo; Biscia, Rodolfo; García La Rota, Andrés, Silvia Rivas: obras, textos y proyectos, Buenos Aires, Ed. Arta, 2016.
- Staek, Klaus; Odenthal, Johannes and Wechsler, Diana, Imágenes entre Realidad y Utopía, Arte e historia en la Argentina, Ed. Ministerio de Relaciones Exteriores, Comercio Internacional y Culto, 2010.
- La Ferla. Jorge, Historia crítica del video argentino, Buenos Aires, Ed. Espacio Fundación Telefónica / Malba – Fundación Costantini, 2008.
- López Anaya, Jorge, Ritos de fin de siglo. Arte argentino y vanguardia internacional, Buenos Aires, Emecé, 2003.
- Oliveras, Elena, La levedad del límite, Buenos Aires, Ed. Fundación Pettoruti, 2000.
