= María Cristina Redondo =

Argentine academic (born 1962)

- Born: 25 April 1962 (age 64); San Fernando del Valle de Catamarca, Argentina
- Occupations: Legal scholar; philosopher
- Awards: Guggenheim Fellowship (2001)

Academic background
- Education: National University of Córdoba; Pompeu Fabra University (PhD)
- Thesis: Normas Jurídicas, Aceptación y Justificación. La Noción de Razón para la Acción como Instrumento de Análisis Conceptual (1995)
- Doctoral advisor: Enrique Caracciolo-Trejo

Academic work
- Discipline: Legal studies; philosophy
- Sub-discipline: Philosophy of law
- Institutions: University of Buenos Aires; CONICET; University of Genoa

María Cristina Redondo (born 25 April 1962) is an Argentine academic. A 2001 Guggenheim Fellow, she has written several books related to legal studies and philosophy, including Positivismo jurídico "interno" (2018).

== Biography ==
María Cristina Redondo was born on 25 April 1962 in San Fernando del Valle de Catamarca. She graduated from the National University of Córdoba in 1985 and worked as an attorney at the College of Lawyers of Córdoba from 1986 to 1988.

After working as assistant professor of philosophy of law (1987-1990) and junior fellow (1991-1992) at the University of Buenos Aires (UBA), she relocated to Spain. She was a visiting academic at the University of Girona (1992-1997) and Pompeu Fabra University (1996), where she obtained a PhD in 1995. Her doctoral thesis Normas Jurídicas, Aceptación y Justificación. La Noción de Razón para la Acción como Instrumento de Análisis Conceptual was supervised by Enrique Caracciolo-Trejo. She returned to Argentina in 1997, becoming associate professor of law at UBA and a senior researcher at CONICET. She was also a postdoctoral fellow at the Fundación Caja Madrid from 1997 to 1998 and began a visiting position at University of Genoa in 1999. By 2024, she had become professor of philosophy of law at the University of Genoa's Tarello Institute for Legal Philosophy.

Redondo specializes in legal theory and practical philosophy. She has authored, co-authored, and co-edited several books and volumes related to law, philosophy, and the philosophy of law. In 2001, she was awarded a Guggenheim Fellowship "for an inquiry into the practical authority of law". In 2018, her book Positivismo Jurídico Interno was published.

== Works ==
- La noción de razón para la acción en el análisis jurídico (1996)
- (with Josep Joan Moreso and Pablo Eugenio Navarro López) Lliçons de filosofia del dret (2000)
- (ed. with Pablo Eugenio Navarro López) La relevancia del derecho: ensayos de filosofía jurídica, moral y política (2002)
- (with Josep Joan Moreso and Pablo Eugenio Navarro López) Filosofía del derecho (2004)
- (with Josep Joan Moreso) Un diálogo con la teoría del derecho de Eugenio Bulygin (2007)
- (with José María Sauca Cano and Perfecto Andrés Ibáñez) Estado de derecho y decisiones judiciales (2009)
- Positivismo jurídico "interno" (2018) (Note: Reviews of this book:)
- (ed. with Diego Dei Vecchi, Sebastián Figueroa Rubio, and Pablo Ariel Rapetti) Law and the Unity of Practical Reasoning (2025)
