= Maura Healey =

Governor of Massachusetts since 2023

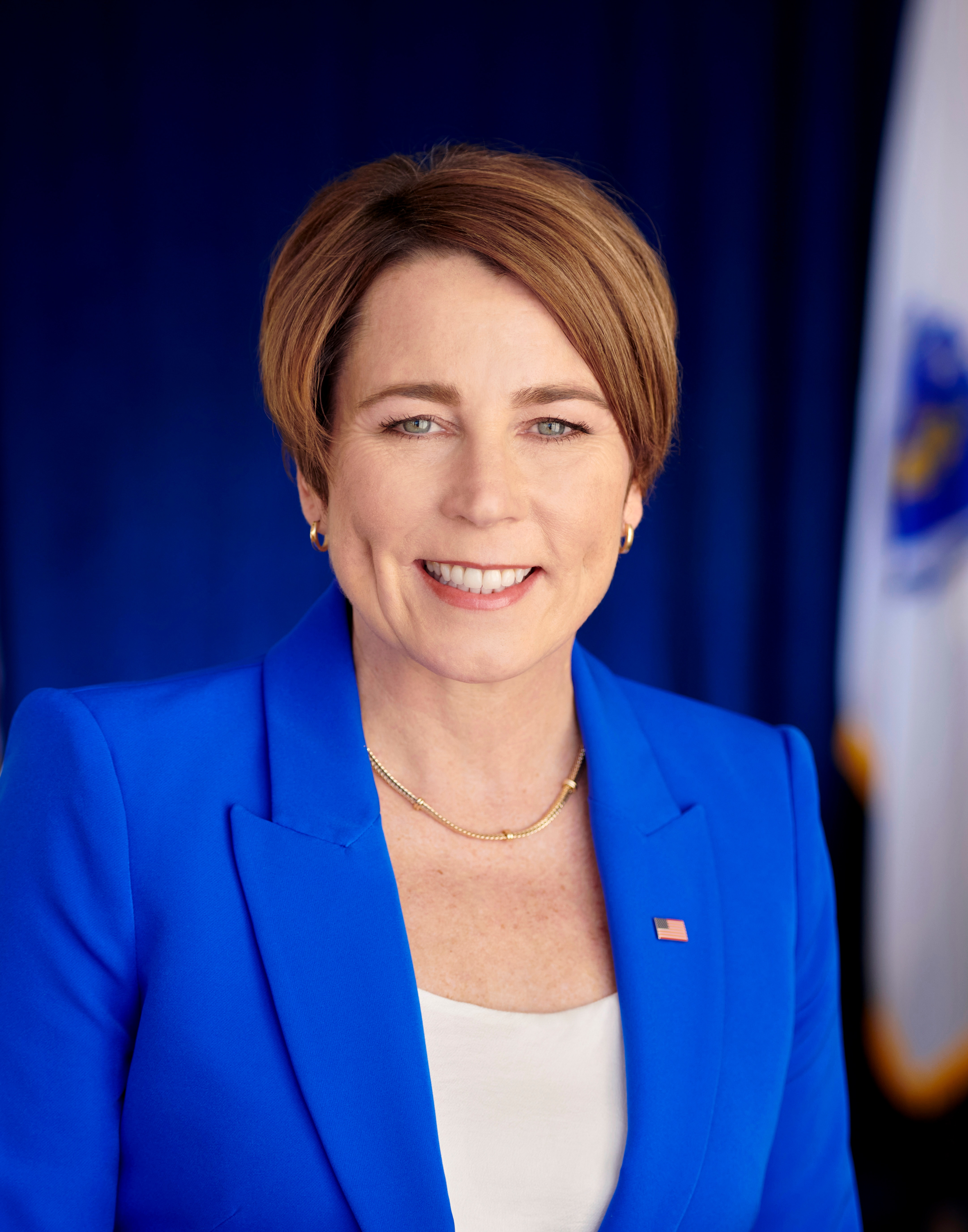
- Official portrait, 2023

73rd Governor of Massachusetts
- Incumbent
- Assumed office January 5, 2023
- Lieutenant: Kim Driscoll
- Preceded by: Charlie Baker

44th Attorney General of Massachusetts
- In office January 21, 2015 – January 5, 2023
- Governor: Charlie Baker
- Preceded by: Martha Coakley
- Succeeded by: Andrea Campbell

Personal details
- Born: Maura Tracy Healey; February 8, 1971 (age 55) Bethesda, Maryland, U.S.
- Party: Democratic
- Domestic partner: Joanna Lydgate
- Education: Harvard University (AB); Northeastern University (JD)
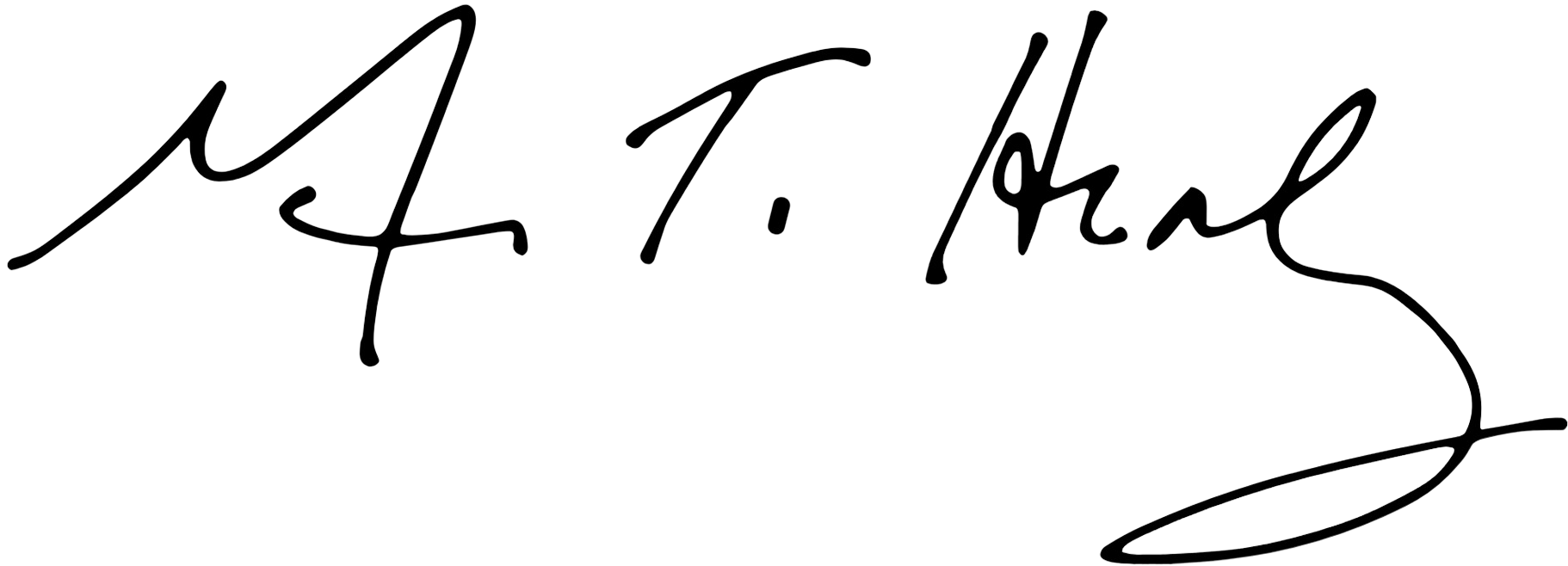
- Signature
- Website: Office website Campaign website
- Healey's voice Maura Healey signs into law S.2967, a bill to accelerate clean energy deployment in Massachusetts. Recorded December 11, 2024

Maura Tracy Healey (born February 8, 1971) is an American lawyer and politician serving as the 73rd governor of Massachusetts since 2023. A member of the Democratic Party, she served as Massachusetts Attorney General from 2015 to 2023, and was elected governor in 2022, the first woman to hold the office.

Hired by Massachusetts Attorney General Martha Coakley in 2007, Healey served as chief of the Civil Rights Division, where she led the state's challenge to the federal Defense of Marriage Act. She was then appointed chief of the Public Protection and Advocacy Bureau and then chief of the Business and Labor Bureau, before resigning in 2013 to run for attorney general in 2014. She defeated former State Senator Warren Tolman in the Democratic primary and Republican attorney John Miller in the general election. Healey was reelected in 2018, before being elected the state's governor in 2022.

In 2014, Healey became the first openly lesbian woman elected attorney general of a U.S. state and the first openly LGBTQ person elected to statewide office in Massachusetts. In 2022, in addition to becoming the first woman to serve as governor of Massachusetts, she became one of the first two openly lesbian women elected governor of a U.S. state.

== Early life and education ==
Healey was born on February 8, 1971, at Walter Reed Hospital, in Bethesda, Maryland. When she was nine months old, her family moved to Hampton Falls, New Hampshire, where she was raised. Healey has four younger siblings. Her mother was a nurse at Lincoln Akerman School in Hampton Falls; her father was a captain in the United States Public Health Service and an engineer. After divorcing, her mother sold her wedding ring to pay for a backyard basketball court. Healey's stepfather, Edward Beattie, taught history and coached girls' sports at Winnacunnet High School. Several of her grandparents and great-grandparents were born in Ireland.

Healey attended Winnacunnet High School, and majored in government at Harvard College, graduating cum laude in 1992. She was co-captain of the Harvard Crimson women's basketball team. After graduation, Healey spent two years playing as a starting point guard for a professional basketball team in Austria, UBBC Wüstenrot Salzburg, now called BBU Salzburg. Upon returning to the United States, she earned a Juris Doctor from Northeastern University School of Law in 1998.

== Career ==
Healey began her legal career by clerking for Judge A. David Mazzone of the United States District Court for the District of Massachusetts, where she prepared monthly compliance reports on the cleanup of the Boston Harbor and assisted the judge with trials, hearings, and case conferences. Healey subsequently spent more than seven years at the law firm Wilmer Cutler Pickering Hale and Dorr LLP, where she worked as an associate and then junior partner and focused on commercial and securities litigation.

She also served as a special assistant district attorney in Middlesex County, where she tried drug, assault, domestic violence, and motor vehicle cases in bench and jury sessions and argued bail hearings, motions to suppress, and probation violations and surrenders.

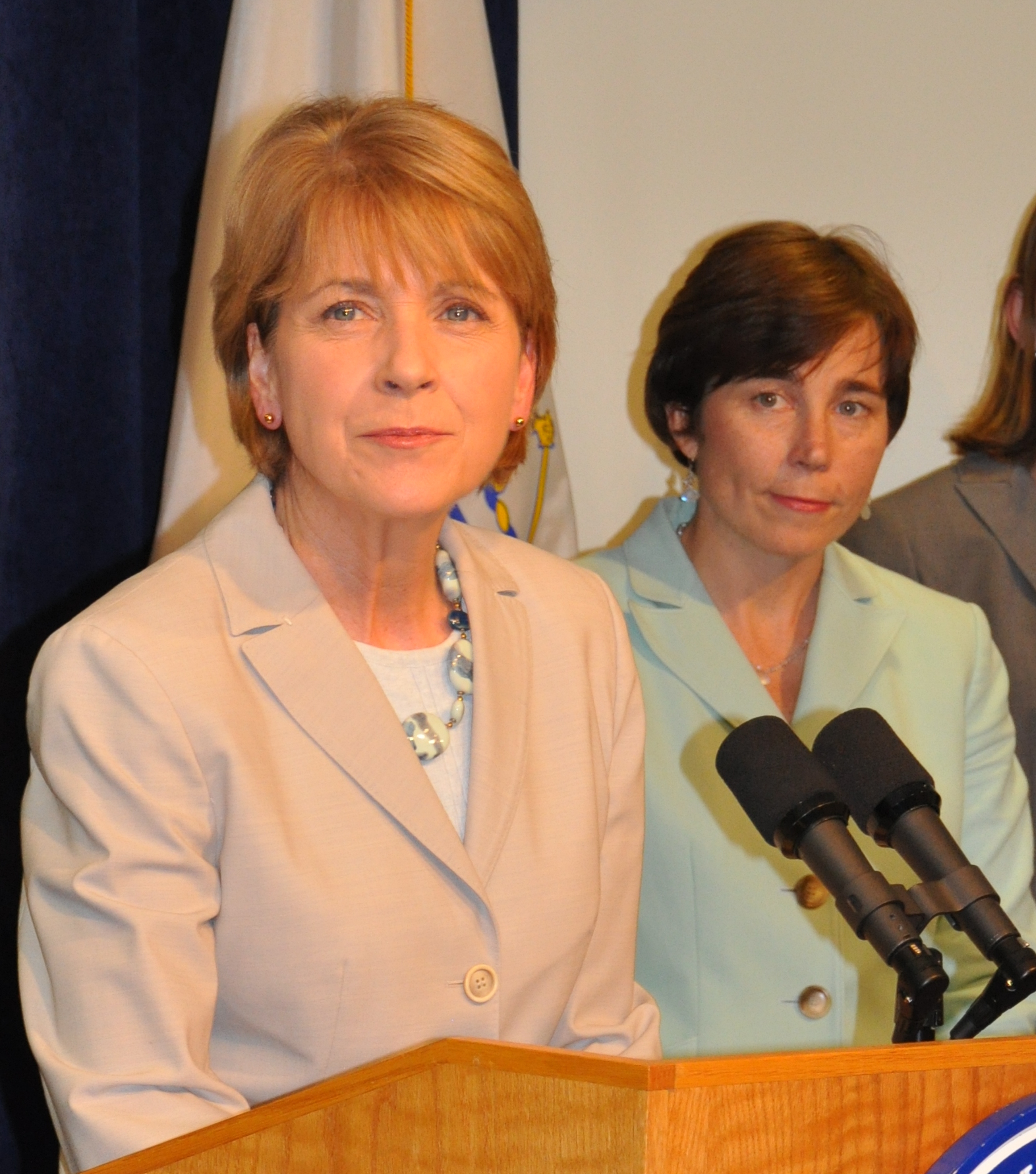
Healey (right) and Massachusetts Attorney General Martha Coakley at a July 8, 2010, press conference on the Massachusetts v. U.S. Dep't of Health & Human Servs. lawsuit challenging the Defense of Marriage Act

Hired by Massachusetts Attorney General Martha Coakley in 2007, Healey served as chief of the Civil Rights Division, where she spearheaded the state's challenge to the federal Defense of Marriage Act. She led the winning arguments for Massachusetts in the country's first lawsuit striking down the law.

In 2012, Healey was promoted to chief of the Public Protection and Advocacy Bureau. She was then appointed chief of the Business and Labor Bureau.

As a division chief and bureau head in the Attorney General's Office, Healey oversaw 250 lawyers and staff members and supervised the areas of consumer protection, fair labor, ratepayer advocacy, environmental protection, health care, insurance and financial services, civil rights, antitrust, Medicaid fraud, nonprofit organizations and charities, and business, technology, and economic development.

== Attorney General of Massachusetts (2015–2023) ==
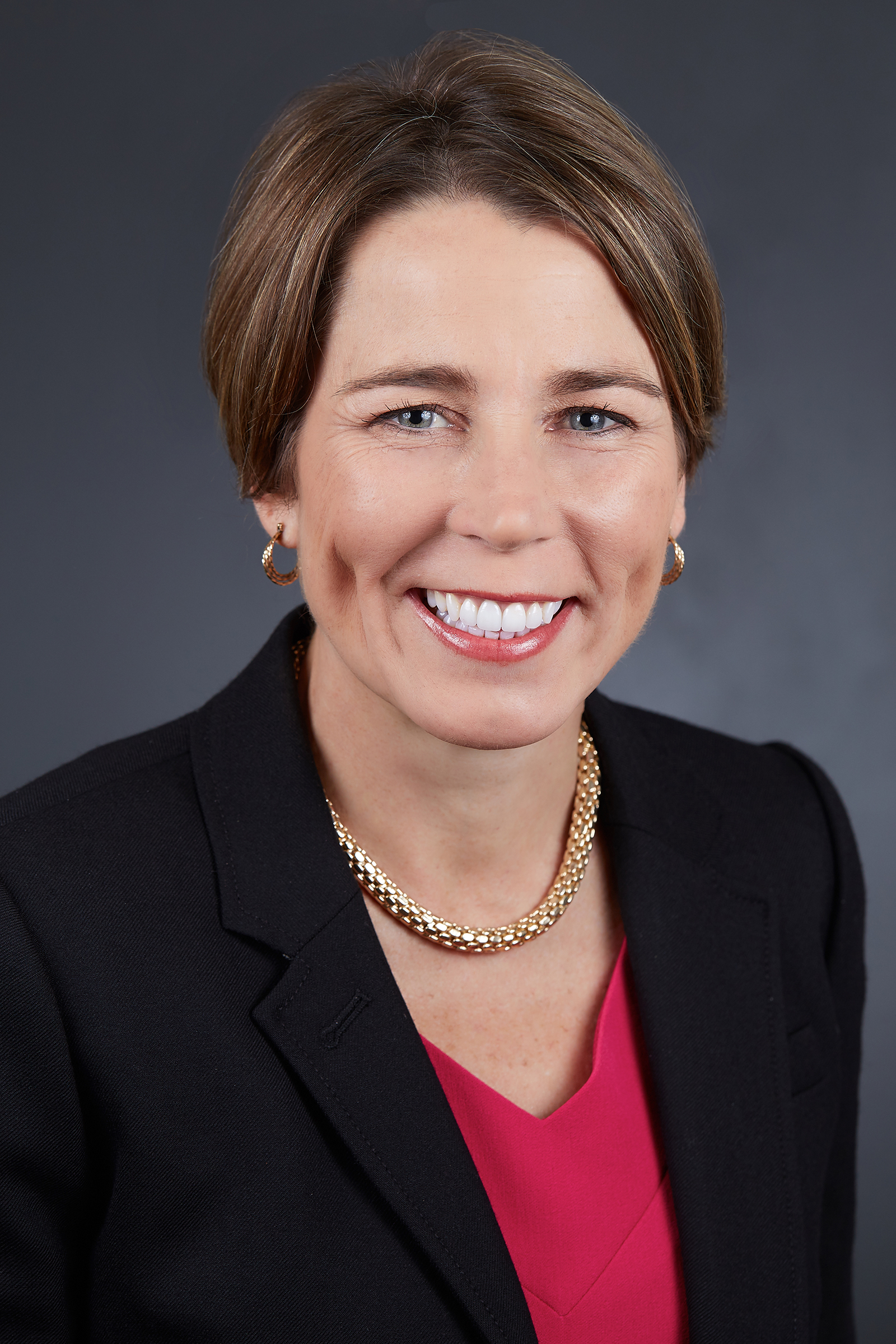
Healey's official attorney general photo, 2015

=== Elections ===
==== 2014 ====
In October 2013, Healey announced her candidacy for attorney general. Coakley was retiring from the office to run for governor. On September 9, 2014, Healey won the Democratic primary by 126,420 votes, defeating former State Senator Warren Tolman, 62.4% to 37.6%.

Healey's campaign was endorsed by State Senators Stan Rosenberg, Dan Wolf, and Jamie Eldridge. It was also endorsed by Northwestern District Attorney David Sullivan, Holyoke Mayor Alex Morse, Fitchburg Mayor Lisa Wong, and Northampton Mayor David Narkewicz. Organizations that endorsed the campaign include the Planned Parenthood Advocacy Fund of Massachusetts, MassEquality, the Victory Fund, and EMILY's List. Healey wrote an op-ed in the Worcester Telegram and Gazette on upholding the Massachusetts buffer zone law, which she worked on at the Attorney General's Office. She also authored an op-ed in The Boston Globe outlining her plan to combat student loan predators.

Healey defeated Republican nominee John Miller, an attorney, in the general election, 62.5% to 37.5%. Upon taking office, she became the United States' first openly lesbian state attorney general.

==== 2018 ====
On November 6, 2018, Healey was reelected Massachusetts Attorney General, defeating Republican nominee James McMahon with 69.9% of the vote.

=== Tenure ===
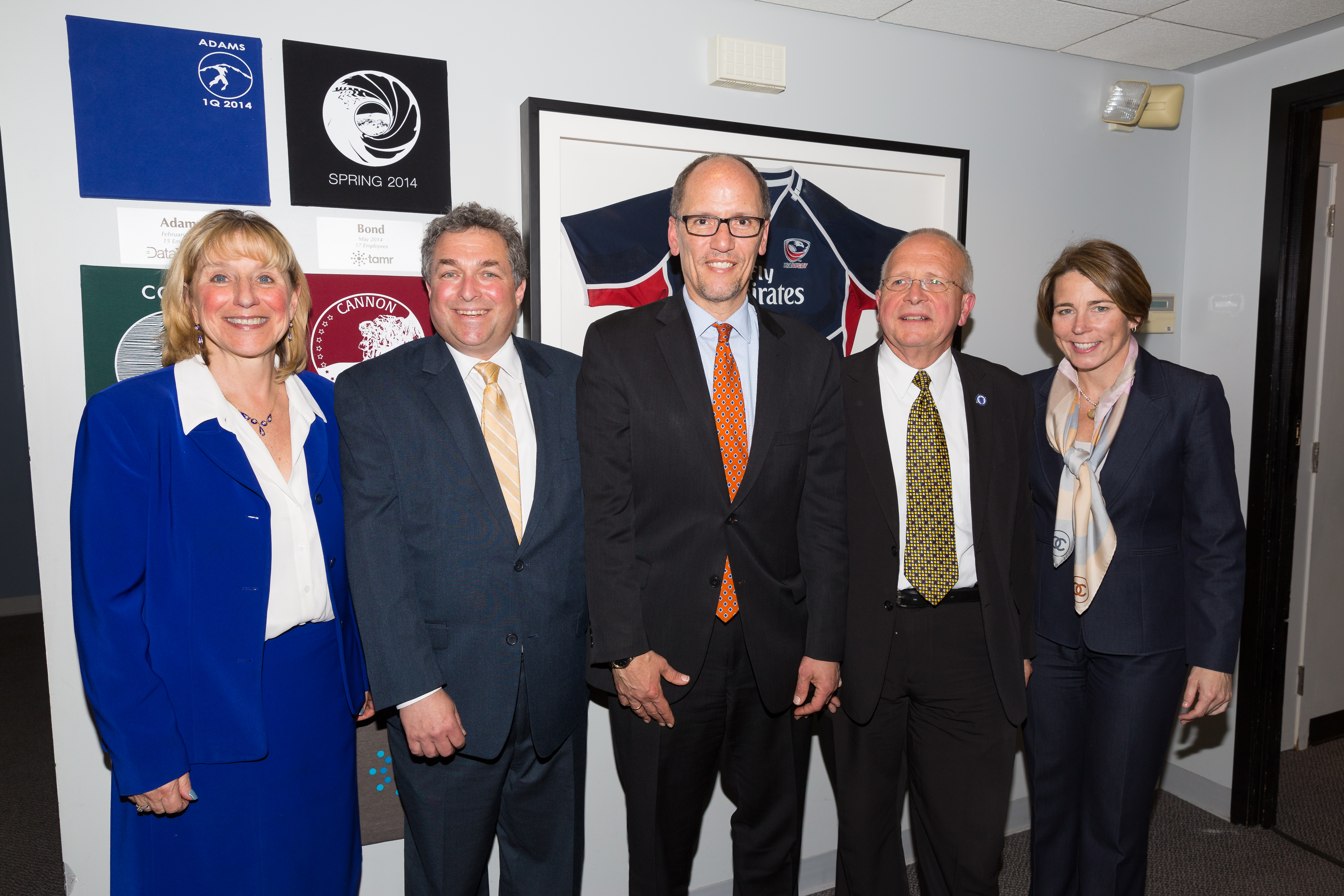
Healey (far right) in 2016 with (left to right): State Senator Karen Spilka, State Rep. Ken Gordon, U.S. Secretary of Labor Tom Perez, and State Rep. John Scibak

Healey's plan to reduce gun violence addresses what she perceives as its root causes. The program includes enhancing the background check system to include information regarding recent restraining orders, pending indictments, and any relations to domestic violence, parole, and probation information. The plan also seeks to track better stolen and missing guns. Healey advocates fingerprint trigger locks and firearm micro-stamping on all guns sold in Massachusetts.

Healey's plan for criminal justice reform includes ending mandatory sentences for nonviolent drug offenders and focusing on treatment rather than incarceration.

Healey plans to combat prescription drug abuse and Massachusetts's heroin epidemic by implementing a "lock-in" program. The program will be carried out in pharmacies to identify and track prescription drug abusers and distributors. Her plan includes deployment of new resources to drug trafficking hotspots, improvement of treatment accessibility, and expanding access to Narcan.

==== Abortion ====
Healey's women's rights platform focuses on sex education, expanding access to abortion services in Massachusetts, and ensuring that every woman in Massachusetts has access to abortion, regardless of where she lives, her occupation, or her income. In 2026, Healey signed into law a bill that allows abortion at any point in a pregnancy, including the third trimester.

==== Gun control ====
On July 20, 2016, Healey announced her intention to ban the manufacturing of most assault rifles in Massachusetts. In 2021, as a result of this and other "arbitrary and damaging legislation", Smith & Wesson announced plans to relocate its headquarters and much of its manufacturing from Massachusetts to Tennessee. The new factory opened in Maryville, in 2023.

==== Trump administration ====
On January 31, 2017, Healey announced that her office was joining a lawsuit challenging President Donald Trump's Executive Order 13769, commonly known as a "Muslim ban." Healey condemned the order as "motivated by anti-Muslim sentiment and Islamophobia, not by a desire to further national security." A federal court eventually struck the order down on similar grounds.

On March 9, 2017, Healey announced that her office was joining a lawsuit challenging Trump's Executive Order 13780. She said the new order, a revised version of the one that had been struck down, "remains a discriminatory and unconstitutional attempt to make good on [Trump's] campaign promise to implement a Muslim ban." The order has been blocked in various federal courts on similar grounds.

On May 11, 2017, after Trump fired FBI Director James Comey, Healey led efforts calling for a special counsel to investigate Russia's meddling in the 2016 U.S. presidential election. Her office sent a letter to that effect, signed by 20 Attorneys General across the nation, to Deputy U.S. Attorney General Rod Rosenstein. On May 17, Rosenstein appointed a special counsel, former FBI director Robert Mueller.

==== Purdue Pharma ====
In 2021, Healey announced a resolution against the Sackler family and Purdue Pharma. The resolution requires a payment of more than $4.3 billion for prevention, treatment, and recovery efforts in communities across the country. It will also require Purdue Pharma to be wound down or sold by 2024 and ensure that the Sacklers are banned from the opioid business and are required to turn over control of family foundations to an independent trustee to be used to address the opioid epidemic.

== Governor of Massachusetts (2023–present) ==
=== Elections ===
==== 2022 ====
Final results by county in 2022: Maura Healey: 40–50%; 50–60%; 60–70%; 70–80%; 80–90%; Geoff Diehl: 40–50%; 50–60%; 60–70%

On January 20, 2022, Healey announced her candidacy in the 2022 Massachusetts gubernatorial election. Her announcement came after the incumbent governor, Charlie Baker, a Republican, announced he would not seek reelection. On September 6, Healey won the Democratic primary election. She defeated Sonia Chang-Díaz, who withdrew from the primary. Healey was endorsed by Vice President Kamala Harris and U.S. Senators Elizabeth Warren and Ed Markey.

On November 8, 2022, Healey defeated Republican nominee Geoff Diehl, receiving 64% of the vote in the general election to Diehl's 35%. This made her the first woman elected governor of Massachusetts and one of the first two openly lesbian governors in the U.S., along with Tina Kotek of Oregon, who was also elected in 2022. She was inaugurated on January 5, 2023.

==== 2026 ====
In February 2025, Healey announced her intention to run for reelection in 2026. On September 1, 2026, she won the Democratic nomination in an uncontested primary. In September 2026, Healey received various law enforcement union and organization endorsements, including the four largest police unions in Massachusetts. The Boston Police Patrolmen's Association, Massachusetts Coalition of Police (MassCOP), the State Police Association of Massachusetts (SPAM), and the Massachusetts State Police Commissioned Officers Association all endorsed Healey. None of them did so in the previous gubernatorial election.

Healey secured the assistance of various prominent national Democrats during the general election season, including fundraisers headlined by Michigan Governor Gretchen Whitmer, former US Transportation Secretary Pete Buttigieg, and Arizona Senator Mark Kelly. Maryland Governor Wes Moore urged voters to donate to her reelection bid in an email circulated by the Healey campaign. On October 1, 2026, Boston Mayor Michelle Wu endorsed Healey for reelection. Healey had declined to publicly support Wu in the 2025 mayoral primary against Josh Kraft. Wu said, "I'm grateful for our work together, from a historic summer that delivered economic impact throughout our neighborhoods, to lowering costs, building more housing, keeping residents safe, and expanding opportunity throughout the Commonwealth".

=== Tenure ===
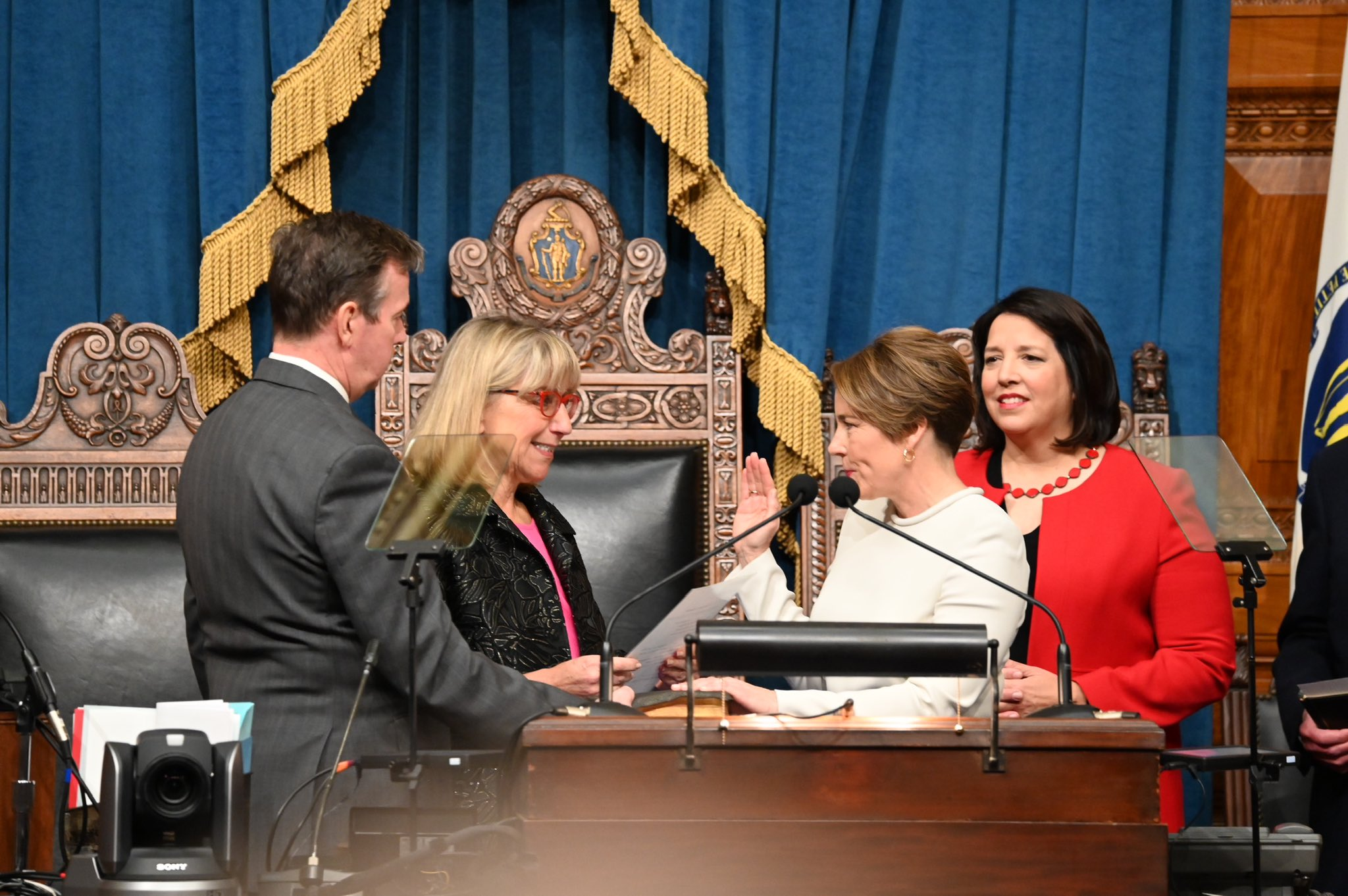
Healey taking oath as governor in 2023

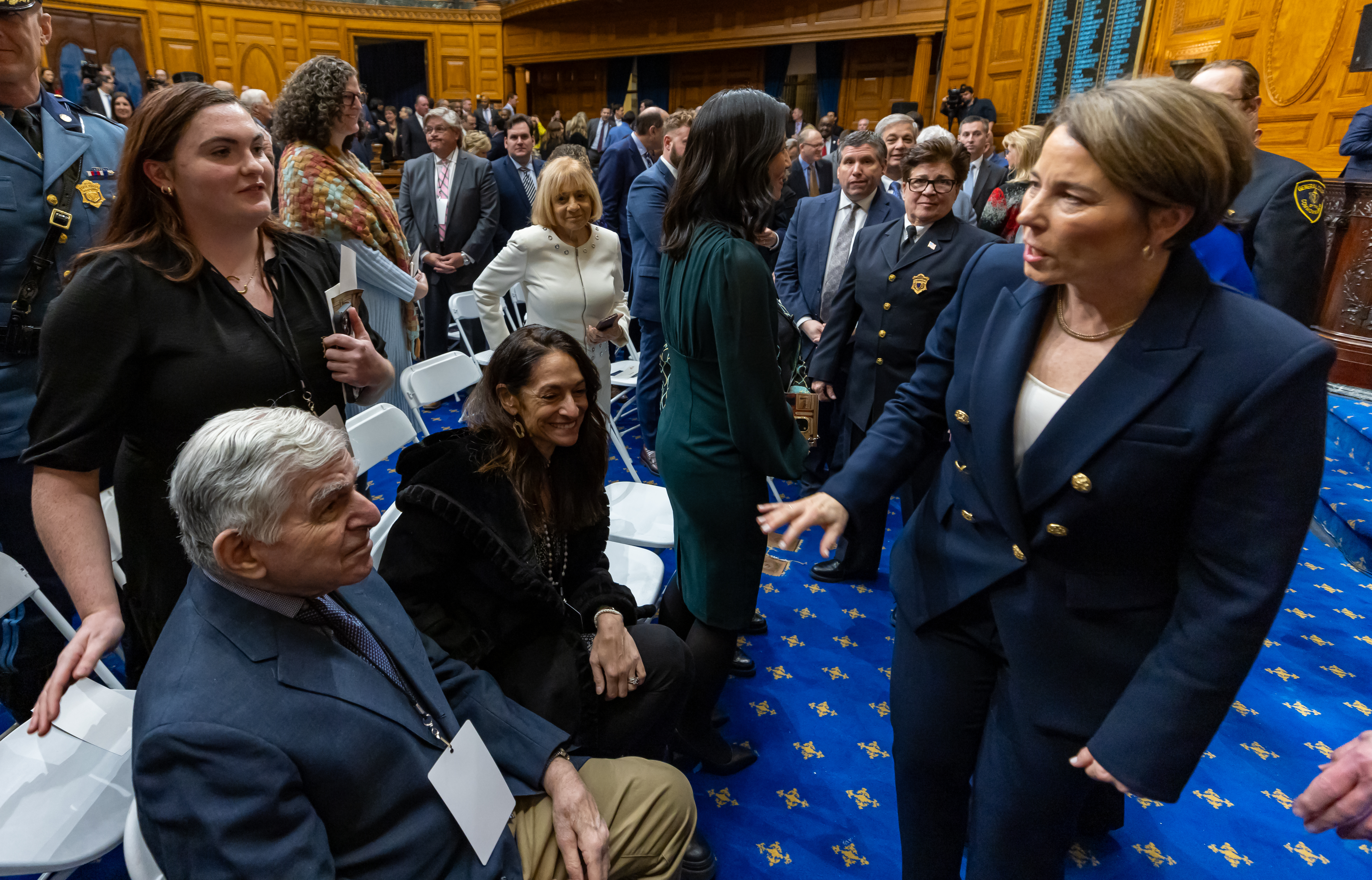
Healey speaking with former governor Michael Dukakis at her 2024 State of the Commonwealth address

The day after being sworn in, Healey signed an Executive Order establishing the Office of Climate Innovation and Resilience and creating a cabinet-level position of Climate Chief to head the office. According to Healey, the office will be tasked with working with state and local leaders to help the Commonwealth reach its climate goals and help coordinate the efforts. The Climate Chief will also be the governor's primary advisor on climate issues. Healey appointed Melissa Hoffer to the role.

In February 2023, the Healey administration announced a $742 million tax cut package to be filed, as an addition to its proposed fiscal year 2024 budget. Among the proposals included was an increase in the child and family tax credit from $240 to $600 per child or dependent. The plans would also increase the rental deduction cap from 50% of rent up to $3,000 to 50% of $4,000. Under the proposal, the state's short-term capital gains tax would be reduced from 12% to 5% and the estate tax threshold would be raised from $1 million to $3 million. The state legislature passed a scaled-back version of this proposal that increased the child and dependent tax credit to $310 for the 2023 tax year and $440 for the following years. The short-term capital gains tax was reduced to 8.5%, and the estate tax was eliminated for all estates under $2 million. Healey signed these changes into law on October 4, 2023.

At a news conference held at Bunker Hill Community College in March 2023, Healey announced a $20 million appropriation to her 2024 fiscal year state budget proposal to create a free community college program, "MassReconnect", for Massachusetts residents 25 or older with a secondary school degree or post-secondary course credits, to address the skills gap in the state workforce. The state legislature approved the plan, as part of the 2024 fiscal year state budget, which Healey signed into law in August. In May 2023, Healey's administration announced $24.4 million in job creation tax incentives for 43 life sciences companies in the state to create 1,600 jobs.

In August 2023, Healey declared a state of emergency due to an increase in migrants seeking shelter in the state. Massachusetts is the only U.S. state that must provide emergency housing to families who qualify. At the time of the emergency declaration, the shelter system was housing over 20,000 people. Healey set a limit of 7,500 on the number of families that could be housed in the state's emergency shelter system. The state exceeded this limit in November 2023. On November 9, Healey announced that families would be placed on a waiting list and would enter the shelter system as housing units became available. In December, she signed a $3.1 billion supplemental budget bill that added another $250 million in funding for the state's shelter system and created an overflow location for migrants who were unable to enter the state's shelter system. Later that month, the administration designated five locations as overflow sites. On April 30, 2024, Healey signed a bill that directed another $251 million into the shelter system for the rest of fiscal year 2024 and limited how long families can stay in the shelter system to nine months.

In February 2024, Healey nominated her former romantic partner, appellate court judge Gabrielle Wolohojian, to the Massachusetts Supreme Judicial Court. Facing criticism for this decision, especially from Massachusetts Republican Party chair Amy Carnevale, who called on her to withdraw the nomination, Healey defended the choice. "I don't want the fact that she had a personal relationship with me to deprive the commonwealth of a person who's most qualified for the position", she told reporters. The Governor's Council approved the nomination on February 28 and Wolohojian was sworn in on April 22.

On October 29, 2025, Healey fired her Western Massachusetts Deputy Director, LaMar Cook, after he was charged with both cocaine trafficking and gun-related charges.

== Political views ==
Healey is regarded as a liberal. In her early career, she was called a "progressive prosecutor", but some progressives criticized her as insufficiently supportive of law enforcement reform. During her 2022 campaign for governor, Healey was characterized as staking out somewhat moderate positions on several issues. As governor, she has taken several moderate and centrist positions on policy. She is regarded as more moderate (less progressive and less liberal) than some other leading Massachusetts Democratic politicians, such as Elizabeth Warren and Michelle Wu. In a 2024 interview, Healey called herself a "pro-growth Democrat" on economic matters, citing her support of tax cuts for the middle class.

== Personal life ==
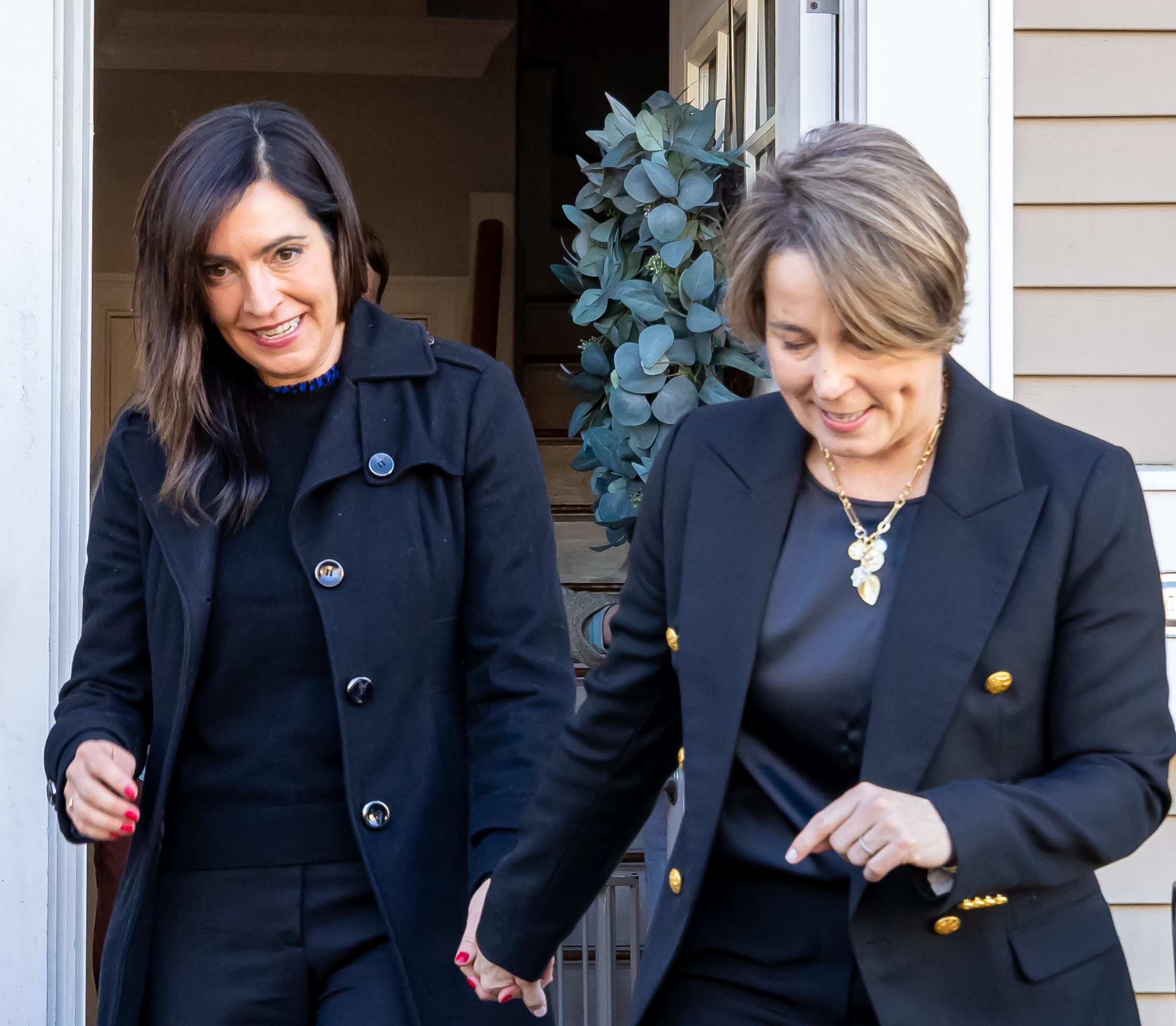
Healey with her partner, Joanna Lydgate (left), in 2023

In July 2022, Healey moved from Boston to Cambridge, Massachusetts. She plays basketball recreationally. On January 9, 2023, shortly after being inaugurated as governor, Healey announced that she was in a relationship with attorney Joanna Lydgate, her former chief deputy. She clarified that their relationship did not begin until Lydgate had departed the role to co-found the States United Democracy Center, a voting rights advocacy organization. Lydgate has taken on the role of "First Partner of Massachusetts".

Healey was baptized in the Catholic Church.

== Electoral history ==
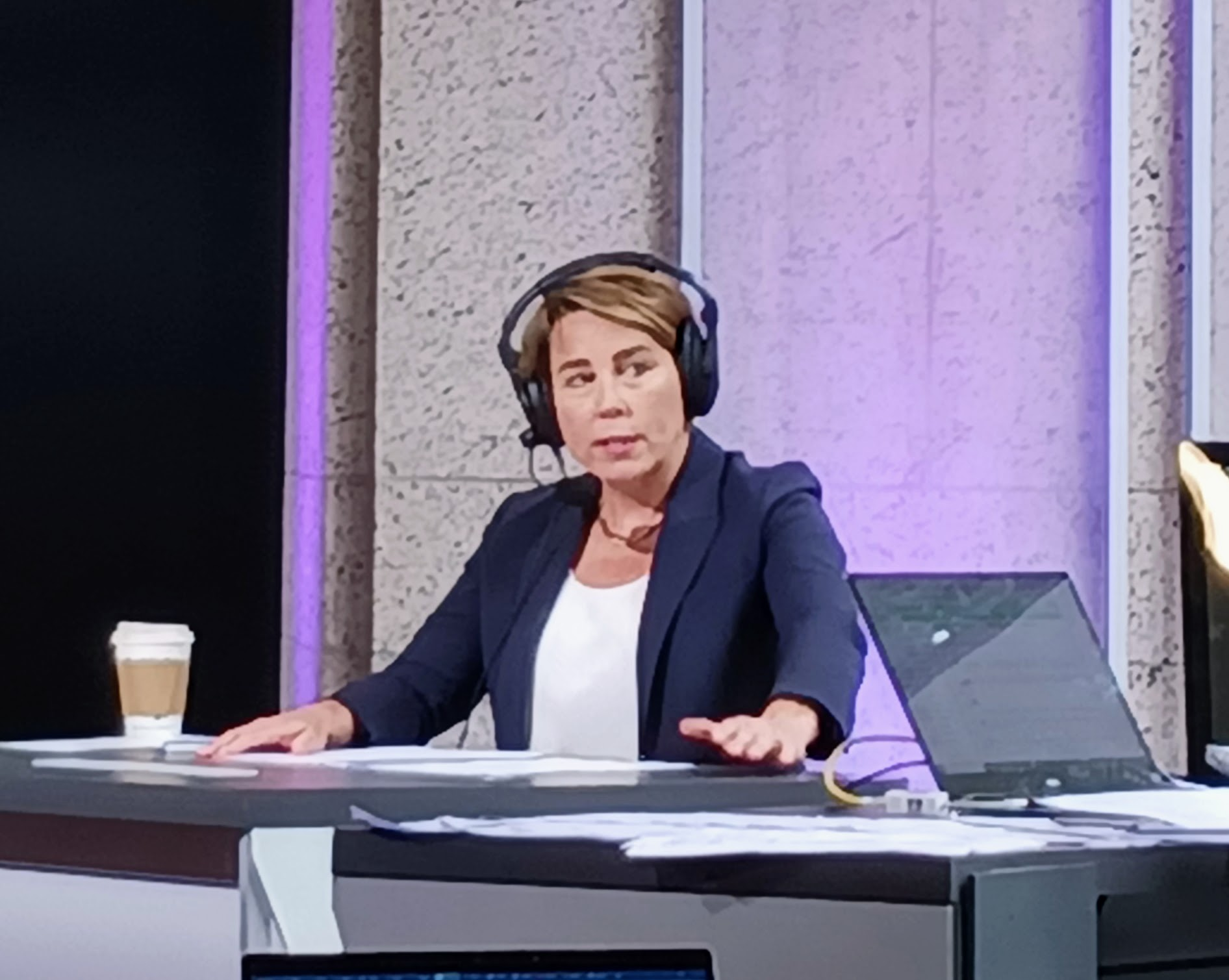
Governor Healey taking questions at the Boston Public Library in 2023.

=== Attorney General of Massachusetts ===
2014 Massachusetts Attorney General Democratic primary election
Party	Candidate	Votes	%
Democratic	Maura Healey	322,380	62.1
Democratic	Warren Tolman	195,654	37.7
Write-in		721	0.1
Total votes		518,755	100.0

2014 Massachusetts Attorney General election
Party	Candidate	Votes	%
Democratic	Maura Healey	1,280,513	61.7
Republican	John Miller	793,821	38.2
Write-in		1,885	0.1
Total votes		2,076,219	100.0

2018 Massachusetts Attorney General election
Party	Candidate	Votes	%
Democratic	Maura Healey	1,874,209	69.9
Republican	Jay McMahon III	804,832	30.0
Write-in		1,858	0.1
Total votes		2,680,899	100.0

=== Governor of Massachusetts ===
Massachusetts gubernatorial Democratic primary election, 2022
Party	Candidate	Votes	%
Democratic	Maura Healey	642,092	85.3
Democratic	Sonia Chang-Diaz	108,574	14.4
Write-in		1,972	0.3
Total votes		777,226	100.0

Massachusetts gubernatorial general election, 2022
Party	Candidate	Votes	%	±%
Democratic	Maura Healey	1,584,403	63.7%	+30.6%
Republican	Geoff Diehl	859,343	34.6%	−32%
Libertarian	Kevin Reed	39,205	1.6%	+1.6%
Turnout		2,508,298	100%	
Democratic gain from Republican		Swing		

== See also ==
- List of female state attorneys general in the United States
- List of female governors in the United States
- List of first openly LGBT politicians in the United States

Party political offices
Preceded by Martha Coakley	Democratic nominee for Attorney General of Massachusetts; 2014, 2018	Succeeded by Andrea Campbell
Preceded by Jay Gonzalez	Democratic nominee for Governor of Massachusetts; 2022, 2026	Most recent
Legal offices
Preceded by Martha Coakley	Attorney General of Massachusetts; 2015–2023	Succeeded by Kate R. Cook; Acting
Political offices
Preceded by Charlie Baker	Governor of Massachusetts; 2023–present	Incumbent
U.S. order of precedence (ceremonial)
Preceded by JD Vance as Vice President	Order of precedence of the United States; Within Massachusetts	Succeeded by Mayor of city in which event is held
Preceded by JD Vance as Vice President	Order of precedence of the United States; Within Massachusetts	Succeeded by Otherwise Mike Johnson as Speaker of the House
Preceded by Ned Lamont as Governor of Connecticut	Order of precedence of the United States; Outside Massachusetts	Succeeded by Wes Moore as Governor of Maryland
