= Kathy Cook (journalist) =

Canadian magazine writer

- Occupation: Magazine writer
- Notable credit: Reader's Digest
- Awards: National Magazine Award

Kathy Cook is a Canadian magazine writer. She has written 22 major feature articles for Reader's Digest magazine, including two international cover stories and six Canadian covers.

At Reader's Digest, Cook specializes in writing "Drama in Real Life" articles. She contributed two chapters to a Reader's Digest hardcover book, Survival Against the Odds. Her work has appeared in more than 40 countries in 18 languages. Cook has also published in Walrus, Elm Street, the National Post, The Globe and Mail, and the Ottawa Citizen.

In 2000–2003, Cook was an editor at Canada.com, Canada’s largest website. She has won four national journalism awards, including a 2005 National Magazine Award in the category of Politics and Public Interest, for an article published in The Walrus about the Sudan, titled "The Peace Wager".

Cook's 2007 non-fiction book about the Northern Uganda/Sudan wars, Stolen Angels, is the source for the film Girl Soldier, starring Uma Thurman, which was in pre-production in 2009.
