= Eva Lundsager =

Abstract landscape painter

Eva Lundsager (born 1960) is an abstract landscape painter. She received her BA from the University of Maryland and MFA from Hunter College. A 2001 recipient of the Guggenheim Fellowship in the field of Fine Arts, Lundsager has been exhibited in the Jack Tilton, New York at the Greenberg Van Doren, and other galleries. She has also published Ascendosphere, a book of her watercolors.

== Biography ==
Eva Lundsager was born in 1960 in Buffalo, New York. She grew up in rural Maryland and later earned her BA from the University of Maryland in 1984. After moving to New York in 1985, she earned her MFA from Hunter College in 1988:. She relocated again in 2000 to St. Louis, Missouri with her family. She lived here until moving to Boston, Massachusetts in 2012.

== Career ==
Lundsager is known for her abstract landscapes completed primarily in oil paint. She also works with watercolor and sumi ink. Lundsager drips, pours, and splatters paint to create a balance of order among non-objective shapes. Her oil paintings are highly impressionistic but capture the meteorological and topographical changes on a landscape. Lundsager describes her watercolor paintings as "acts of 'hysterical ecstasy'". Lundsager's work is highly influenced by painters Marsden Hartley, Charles Burchfield, and Odilon Redon. Her work is evocative of Yayoi Kusama and her signature infinity nets. Lundsager secured her first solo exhibition at the Stephanie Theodore Gallery in Brooklyn, New York in 1993. In 1995 Lundsager was shown in the Jack Tilton Gallery. She received the Guggenheim Fellowship in Fine Arts in 2001. In 2005 Eva Lundsager was exhibited alongside Hans Hoffman in the Greenberg Van Doren gallery. She published a book of her watercolors, titled Ascendosphere, in 2009. In 2013, Lundsager's work was exhibited alongside Anne Truitt's work, who was Lundsager's professor at University of Maryland at the Academy Art Museum located in Eastern Shore, Maryland, where Truitt lived. In 2023, her work was exhibited at the Praise Shadows Gallery in Brookline, MA. She currently serves as a part-time lecturer at Tufts University.

== Permanent collections ==
Lundsager permanent collections in the following museums

- Dallas Museum of Art
- Nerman Museum of Contemporary Art
- St. Louis Art Museum
- The United States' State Department Art in Embassies
- Whanki Museum in South Korea
