= Martha Burgess =

American artist (born 1957)

- Education: Yale University
- Occupations: Installation artist; new media artist; sculptor
- Employer: The New School; International Center of Photography; Parsons School of Design
- Awards: Guggenheim Fellowship (1999)

Martha Holloway Burgess is an American artist who has worked in installation art, new media, and sculpture. Burgess is a 2001 Guggenheim Fellow and has also taught at several institutions, including The New School, the International Center of Photography, and Parsons School of Design.

== Biography ==
Martha Burgess obtained their bachelor's degree in art (minoring in philosophy and psychology) and their master of fine arts degree at Yale University in 1982. In 1987 they were a P.S. 1 Contemporary Art Center studio fellow. In 1989, the Longwood Art Gallery exhibited one of their sculptures, a table whose top was an exercise book with a Roque Dalton poetry quote pasted to the cover. They also had another sculpture commissioned for Food Center Sculpture Park at the Hunts Point Cooperative Market in 1991.

In 1993, their sculpture On Leave, depicting two female World War II personnel kissing, was exhibited at the Snug Harbor Outdoor Sculpture Exhibition. A tribute to lesbian military personnel in World War II, it was inspired by the V-J Day in Times Square photograph. It was vandalized on September 16, 1993; William Zimmer of The New York Times attributed this to homophobia, while Gale Harris of the NYC LGBT Historic Sites Project found the incident "indicative of how contentious gay-straight relations remained on Staten Island in the 1990s".

They joined The New School University in 1995 as an adjunct faculty member in digital photography, before becoming Adjunct Professor of Digital Media at the International Center of Photography (ICP) in 1997. In 1998, they left the ICP and moved to Parsons School of Design. Burgess was a 1997 MacDowell Colony Fellow, as well as a 1999 fellow of both the Jerome Foundation and New York Foundation for the Arts. In 2001, Burgess was awarded a Guggenheim Fellowship in new media arts.

In 2000, they had a solo exhibition at Gary Tatintsian Gallery. Later that year, their exhibition Ignatz' Nose Travels in Still Life, inspired by the fictional mouse Ignatz from Krazy Kat (which Burgess was a fan of during their youth), appeared at Rice Gallery at Rice University. Their installation Nocturne, opus no. 23, "moonlighting", a five-minute video installation where Beethoven's Piano Sonata No. 14 played as a montage of black-and-white images – which Texas Monthly compared to Robert Frank's book The Americans – on a large plasma screen TV, was exhibited at 2002 FotoFest in Houston.

Their work The Body in Flux appeared at the Pop-Museum of Queer History in 2013. In 2017, their work "Queer as a Clockwork Peachfish", inspired by the film A Clockwork Orange, was exhibited at Trestle Art Space.

Burgess lives in Manhattan, having lived in the state of New York since 1984.
