= Kate R. Cook =

21st century American attorney, government official

Kate Cook

Chief of staff to the Governor of Massachusetts
- Incumbent
- Assumed office January 5, 2023
- Governor: Maura Healey
- Preceded by: Kristen LePore

Acting Attorney General of Massachusetts
- In office January 5, 2023
- Governor: Charlie Baker
- Preceded by: Maura Healey
- Succeeded by: Bessie Dewar (acting)

First Assistant Attorney General of Massachusetts
- In office November 2021 – January 5, 2023
- Preceded by: Mary Strother
- Succeeded by: Pat Moore

Personal details
- Party: Democratic
- Education: Brown University (BA); Harvard University (JD)

Kate R. Cook is an American lawyer and government official serving as the chief of staff for the Massachusetts governor's office since January 2023.

== Education ==
Cook is a graduate of Brown University and Harvard Law School and a member of the Boston Bar Association.

== Career ==
=== Early career ===
Cook served as assistant corporation counsel at the City of Boston, general counsel to the Massachusetts Senate Ways & Means Committee, Appointed Commissioner to the Commission on Judicial Conduct for Massachusetts, and chief legal counsel to Massachusetts Governor Deval L. Patrick.

=== Private practice ===
Cook was a partner at Sugarman, Rogers, Barshak & Cohen P.C. law firm where she chaired the government law and election law practice groups and had an active pro bono practice focused on civil rights and civil liberties matters.

=== Massachusetts Attorney General's office ===
In November 2021, Massachusetts attorney general (AG) Maura Healey announced that she had appointed Cook as First Assistant Attorney General, succeeding Mary Strother, who resigned to take a job in the private sector. Cook began serving as the first assistant attorney general in January 2022. Cook's responsibilities include helping to manage the legal work of the Attorney General's Office.

Cook briefly served as the acting attorney general of Massachusetts on January 5, 2023, for a few hours in the morning after Maura Healey resigned to become Governor of Massachusetts but before her swearing in at noon. She resigned at noon to become Healey's chief of staff. State Solicitor Bessie Dewar then served as the acting attorney general of Massachusetts, taking the helm of the Massachusetts Attorney General's Office from Cook, from noon on January 5, 2023, until Attorney General Andrea Campbell was sworn in on January 18, 2023. Then Attorney General-elect Campbell named Pat Moore to succeed Cook as First Assistant Attorney General.

=== Massachusetts Governor's office ===
In December 2022, Cook was named by governor-elect Healey to be chief of staff of the governor's office and assumed that office on January 5, 2023.

Legal offices
Preceded by Maura Healey	Attorney General of Massachusetts; Acting; 2023	Succeeded by Bessie Dewar; Acting
