= Jocelyn Lee (artist) =

American photographer

- Born: 1962 (age 63–64); Naples, Italy
- Education: Yale University (BA); Hunter College (MFA)
- Known for: Photography
- Website: www.jocelynleestudio.com

Jocelyn Lee is an American contemporary artist and photographer currently based in Portland, Maine and Brooklyn, New York.

Lee has been making psychological portraits for over 40 years. Her work has been exhibited internationally and is included in many public and private collections. She works exclusively in film with a medium format camera.

== Early life ==
Lee was born in Naples, Italy. She began making photographs at the age of eighteen having taken a high school photography class. She received her B.A. in philosophy and visual arts from Yale University, and her M.F.A in photography from Hunter College. She has received multiple awards including a Maine Arts Commission Fellowship in 2021; a NYFA Fellowship in 2013; and a Guggenheim Fellowship in 2001.

== Career ==
Lee creates color photographic portraits, oftentimes of people who she knows such as family members, as well as of people whom she's never before met. She finds models for some of her photographs by placing ads in local newspapers. Many of her subjects are depicted nude or are minimally dressed. Some of her photographs depict landscapes and many of her portraits were taken outdoors. The American poet Sharon Olds wrote the foreword to Lee's book "Jocelyn Lee: Nowhere But Here" (2010).

Lee has taught for twenty years, first at The Maine College of Art from 1993-2001 and then at Princeton University from 2002-2014. In 2015 she founded SPEEDWELL projects, a non-profit dedicated to supporting the work of mid to late career artists whose work is flying under the radar. In 2026 SPEEDWELL initiated a 45K grant for women artists who have demonstrated 45+ years of work to their practice.

In November 2026 Jocelyn will take a Sprinter Van across the US to photograph strangers for a project called In Search Of Beauty. She will be photographing people who have responded to ads on Craigslist and Instagram about who they find beautiful. She also has two books coming out in the Fall of 2027 and Fall 2028 with TBW Books and Dust Collective respectively.

In 2026 she will publish her fourth monograph “The Tree” with TBW Press; her third monograph "Sovereign" was published by Minor Matters Books in November 2020 with an essay by curator Dr. April Watson; her first monograph "Nowhere but here" was published by Steidl Publishers in December 2010 with a foreword by Sharon Olds; and in 1996 her work The Youngest Parents was published by DoubleTake Books and The Center for Documentary Studies at Duke University in collaboration with Robert Coles and John Moses.

Lee has exhibited nationally and internationally, most recently in the major retrospective "American Photography" exhibition at the Rijksmusuem in Amsterdam, The Netherlands (2025), and in solo shows at the Huxley-Parlour Gallery, London (2018) and The Center for Maine Contemporary Art in Rockland, Maine (2018). She has also been included in significant group shows at the DeCordova Museum in Lincoln, Massachusetts (2018); the Portland Museum of Art, Portland, Maine (2017) and (2013) for which she won a purchase prize; Wesleyan University (2017); Rose Gallery in L.A. (2017); Pace MacGill Gallery (2017); The Print Space in London, UK (2014); The Nelson Atkins Museum in Kansas City, MO (2014); and the John Michael Kohler Arts Center in Sheboygan, WI (2014).

Other significant solo and large exhibitions of her work include a solo show at Flatland Gallery in Amsterdam, the Netherlands (2012); Rose Gallery in L.A. (2011) and Pace MacGill Gallery in NY (2010) to accompany her the publication of her monograph Nowhere but here; “Feature Photography” at The National Portrait Gallery, Smithsonian Institution in Washington, DC, (2008); "Last Light" at The University of Southern Maine, Solo (2008); Pace MacGill Gallery in NY, Solo (2007) and Group (2005); The De Cordova Museum in Waltham, MA (2007); The Center for Maine Contemporary Art, Rockland, ME, Solo (2007), The University of Maine Museum of Art, Solo (2006); Stone Hill College, Easton, MA, Solo (2005);The Bernard Toale Gallery, Boston, MA, Solo (2004/2003); The Bates College Museum of Art in Augusta, ME, (2004); The Smith College Museum of Art in Northampton, MA (2004); The Colby College Museum of Art, Waterville, ME, (2004); Jackson Fine Art in Atlanta, GA, (2003); The LFL Gallery in NYC, Solo (2001); The Portland Museum of Art in Portland, ME, (2001); and The Rose Art Museum, Brandeis University, Waltham, MA (2000).
