= Cathy Cook =

American filmmaker (born 1955)

- Born: June 10, 1955 (age 71); Chicago, Illinois, U.S.
- Education: University of Wisconsin–Milwaukee (BFA and MFA)
- Occupation: Filmmaker
- Employer: University of Wisconsin–Whitewater; University of Wisconsin–Milwaukee; Hunter College; University of Maryland, Baltimore County
- Awards: Guggenheim Fellowship (2001)

Cathy C. Cook (born June 10, 1955) is an American filmmaker. A 2001 Guggenheim Fellow, she has made several award-winning films, including The Match That Started My Fire (1992), A Deed Without a Name (1993), and Beyond Voluntary Control (2000). She is an associate professor in visual arts at the University of Maryland, Baltimore County.

== Biography ==
Cook was born on June 10, 1955, in Chicago. She attended the University of Wisconsin–Milwaukee, where she obtained her BFA in 1984 and MFA in 1988. She worked simultaneously as an instructor at the University of Wisconsin–Whitewater (1984–1985) and UW Milwaukee (1985–1991). Following her graduate studies, she later moved to the New York City area, where she at the media industry as an art director, as well as assistant professor of film at Hunter College from 1993 to 1995. She later moved to University of Maryland, Baltimore County, becoming associate professor there.

Cook has produced well over a dozen short films, some of which won awards. One of them, The Match That Started My Fire, won a best work award at the 1992 Ann Arbor Film Festival; Christopher Potter of The Ann Arbor News criticized the choice, saying: "artistically, was this randy reminiscence worthy of best-in-show? Hardly." Her film A Deed Without a Name (1993) won the 1993 Black Maria Festival Juror's Award, as well as festival awards at the 19th Poetry Film/Video Festival and 5th Annual Poetry Video Festival. She returned to the AAFF for their 2001 edition, winning the Best Editing Award for her 2000 film Beyond Voluntary Control, inspired by her mother's battle with Parkinson's disease. In 2009, she released Immortal Cupboard: In Search of Lorine Niedecker, an experimental documentary on the poet Lorine Niedecker; Post45 called it "a filmic labor of love that operates through a poetic logic of superimposition".

Cook was a 1991 Wisconsin Arts Board Fellow and 1998 New York State Council on the Arts Fellow. In 2001, she was awarded a Guggenheim Fellowship in filmmaking.

As of 2000, Cook lived in Brooklyn.

== Filmography ==
- June Brides (1987)
- Bust Up (1989)
- The Match That Started My Fire (1992)
- A Deed Without a Name (1993)
- Beyond Voluntary Control (2000)
