= Roberto Juarez (artist) =

American visual artist (born 1952)

- Born: 1952 (age 73–74)
- Education: San Francisco Art Institute (B.F.A)
- Website: http://www.robertojuarezstudio.com/

Roberto Juarez (born 1952) is an American visual artist known for his paintings, murals, and mixed-media works.

== Early life and education ==
Born in Chicago, Juarez received his B.F.A. at the San Francisco Art Institute (1977) and pursued graduate studies in Television and Film at the University of California, Los Angeles. Juarez frequently employs painterly floral motifs, which are inspired by the traditions of Hispanic and non-Western painting.

In 1978, Juarez completed his graduate thesis for UCLA in Paris and decided not to return to L.A. Juarez relocated to New York City, where in 1981, Ellen Stewart offered Juarez a former garage owned by La MaMa Experimental Theatre Club as an artist studio. The space, which had no water or electricity, was offered to Juarez rent-free, provided that he clean and maintain it.

Throughout the 80s and 90s Juarez painted the branching forms of trees and flowers. While living in Miami in the 90s, Juarez began to incorporate peat moss, rice paper, and other natural materials in his canvases. Since 2000, and his move from Miami back to New York, Juarez's imagery turned more abstract, typically featuring geometric forms and systems. In a review from this period, art critic Grace Glueck noted that his works feature “a contrast between the softness of the grounds – blends of transparent and opaque materials in muted colors – and their strong geometric-organic motifs."

== Career ==
His work has been exhibited throughout the United States and Mexico, and is included in major museum collections such as the Brooklyn Museum, the Metropolitan Museum of Art, El Museo del Barrio, the Denver Art Museum, the Kemper Museum of Contemporary Art, the Los Angeles County Museum of Art, Pérez Art Museum Miami, the Newark Museum, and the Speed Art Museum. He has completed public art projects and murals for the Miami International Airport, Grand Central Terminal, the Miami-Dade County Courthouse, Whitman College, and the University of Michigan College of Engineering.

Juarez won the Prix de Rome in 1997 and was a Guggenheim Fellow in 2001–2002.
