= Graciela Boente =

Argentine mathematical statistician

Graciela Lina Boente Boente
- Education: University of Buenos Aires
- Occupation: Mathematical statistician
- Awards: Guggenheim Fellow

Graciela Lina Boente Boente is an Argentine mathematical statistician at the University of Buenos Aires. She is known for her research in robust statistics, and particularly for robust methods for principal component analysis and regression analysis.

== Education ==
Boente earned her Ph.D. in 1983 from the University of Buenos Aires. Her dissertation, Robust Principal Components, was supervised by Victor J. Yohai.

== Awards and honors ==
Boente became a Guggenheim Fellow in 2001. In 2008, the Argentine National Academy of Exact, Physical and Natural Sciences gave her their Consecration Prize in recognition of her contributions and teaching. She became an honored fellow of the Institute of Mathematical Statistics in 2013, "for her research in robust statistics and estimation, and for outstanding service to the statistical community".
